= 2019 Poker Masters =

Series of poker tournaments

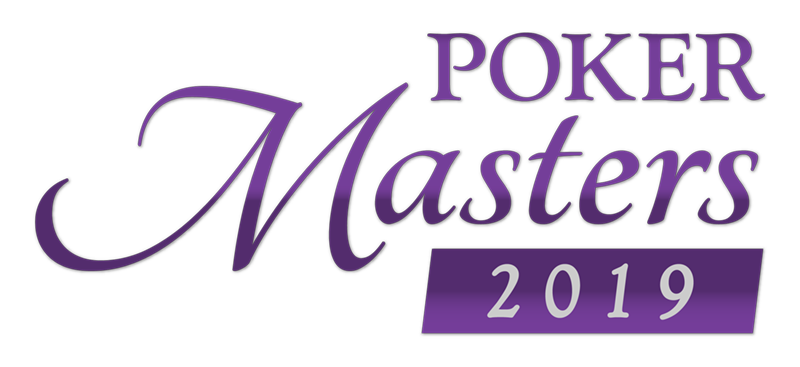
- Venue: PokerGO Studio at ARIA Resort & Casino
- Location: Las Vegas, Nevada
- Dates: November 4-14, 2019

Champion
- (United States) Sam Soverel (Purple Jacket winner); (United States) Sam Soverel (Main Event winner)

The 2019 Poker Masters was the third season of the Poker Masters. It took place from November 4-14, 2019, from the PokerGO Studio at ARIA Resort & Casino in Las Vegas, Nevada. The event was sponsored by Poker Central, and every final table was streamed on PokerGO. There were ten events on the schedule including five No-Limit Hold'em, two Pot-Limit Omaha, and then a Short Deck, 8-Game, and Big Bet Mix. Buy-ins ranged from $10,000 to the $50,000 Main Event.

The Main Event was won by America's Sam Soverel, and he also won the Poker Masters Purple Jacket.

== Schedule ==
The schedule for the 2019 Poker Masters included five No-Limit Hold'em tournaments, two Pot-Limit Omaha tournaments, and a Short Deck event. New additions to the schedule from the 2018 Poker Masters included an 8-Game Mix tournament and Big Bet Mix. 8-Game is a rotation of H.O.R.S.E., No-Limit Hold'em, Pot-Limit Omaha, and 2-7 Triple Draw. Big Bet Mix is a rotation of No-Limit Hold'em, Pot-Limit Omaha, and No-Limit 2-7 Single Draw.

Each event lasted two days, with the first day ending once the final table was down to six players. Those players returned the next day to resume play with the action streamed on PokerGO.

2019 Poker Masters
#	Event	Entrants	Prize Pool (US$)	Winner	Winning Hand	Prize (US$)	Runner-up	Losing hand	Results
1	$10,000 No-Limit Hold'em	97	$970,000	(United States) Isaac Baron	5♣ 3♣	$223,100	(United States) Chance Kornuth	A♥ 9♥	Results
2	$10,000 Pot-Limit Omaha	62	$620,000	(United States) Ryan Laplante	10♠ 10♥ 9♣ 8♠	$186,000	(United States) Chance Kornuth	Q♥ Q♦ 6♣ 3♠	Results
3	$10,000 Short Deck	37	$370,000	(United States) Jonathan Depa	Q♠ J♦	$133,200	(United States) Alex Foxen	J♥ 9♦	Results
4	$10,000 8-Game Mix	45	$450,000	(United States) Jared Bleznick	A♠ K♣ 10♦ 2♦	$153,000	(United States) Cary Katz	10♥ 5♥ 4♠ 4♣	Results
5	$10,000 Big Bet Mix	52	$520,000	(France) Julien Martini	A♥ 8♦	$166,400	(Australia) Kahle Burns	K♦ 3♣	Results
6	$25,000 No-Limit Hold'em	51	$1,275,000	(Canada) Kristen Bicknell	8♠ 8♥	$408,000	(United States) Chance Kornuth	9♦ 9♥	Results
7	$25,000 Pot-Limit Omaha	34	$850,000	(United States) Sam Soverel	J♠ 9♣ 6♥ 4♣	$340,000	(United States) Sean Winter	A♠ K♦ 10♣ 8♥	Results
8	$25,000 No-Limit Hold'em	41	$1,025,000	(Spain) Sergi Reixach	A♥ A♣	$369,000	(United States) George Wolff	6♥ 4♥	Results
9	$25,000 No-Limit Hold'em	49	$1,225,000	(Australia) Kahle Burns	A♦ J♥	$416,500	(Bosnia and Herzegovina) Ali Imsirovic	Q♣ J♣	Results
10	$50,000 No Limit Hold'em Main Event	34	$1,700,000	(United States) Sam Soverel	Q♦ 10♥	$680,000	(United States) Chris Hunichen	2♠ 2♥	Results

== Purple Jacket standings ==
The 2019 Poker Masters awarded the Purple Jacket to the player that accumulated the most points during the series. American Sam Soverel won two events and cashed seven times on his way to accumulating $1,396,800 in winnings. Soverel accumulated 1,160 points and was awarded the Purple Jacket.

Poker Masters Purple Jacket Standings
Rank	Name	Earnings	Points
1	(United States) Sam Soverel	$1,396,800	1,160
2	(Australia) Kahle Burns	$585,950	630
3	(United States) Chance Kornuth	$556,400	630
4	(United States) Sean Winter	$495,350	480
5	(Bosnia and Herzegovina) Ali Imsirovic	$497,600	450
6	(United States) George Wolff	$404,500	420
7	(United States) Alex Foxen	$169,450	330
8	(Canada) Kristen Bicknell	$408,000	300
9	(Spain) Sergi Reixach	$369,000	300
10	(United States) Isaac Baron	$223,100	300

== Results ==
=== Event #1: $10,000 No-Limit Hold'em ===
- 2-Day Event: November 4-5, 2019
- Number of Entrants: 97
- Total Prize Pool: $970,000
- Number of Payouts: 14
- Winning Hand: 5♣ 3♣

Event #1 Results
Place	Name	Prize
1st	(United States) Isaac Baron	$223,100
2nd	(United States) Chance Kornuth	$164,900
3rd	(United States) Ralph Wong	$116,400
4th	(United States) Jeremy Ausmus	$97,000
5th	(United States) Sam Soverel	$77,600
6th	(United States) Scott Blumstein	$58,200
7th	(United States) Dan Shak	$48,500
8th	(Vietnam) Thai Ha	$38,800
9th	(United States) Sean Winter	$29,100
10th	(Greece) Antonios Roungeris	$29,100
11th	(United States) Joseph Orsino	$291,00
12th	(United States) Alex Foxen	$19,400
13th	(United States) Randall Emmett	$19,400
14th	(United Kingdom) Stephen Chidwick	$19,400

=== Event #2: $10,000 Pot-Limit Omaha ===
- 2-Day Event: November 5-6, 2019
- Number of Entrants: 62
- Total Prize Pool: $620,000
- Number of Payouts: 9
- Winning Hand:10♠ 10♥ 9♣ 8♠

Event #2 Results
Place	Name	Prize
1st	(United States) Ryan Laplante	$186,000
2nd	(United States) Chance Kornuth	$124,000
3rd	(Vietnam) Thai Ha	$86,000
4th	(United States) John Riordan	$62,000
5th	(Bosnia and Herzegovina) Ali Imsirovic	$49,600
6th	(United States) Tim McDermott	$37,200
7th	(United States) Damjan Radanov	$31,000
8th	(United States) Brent Roberts	$24,800
9th	(United States) Anthony Zinno	$18,600

=== Event #3: $10,000 Short Deck ===
- 2-Day Event: November 6-7, 2019
- Number of Entrants: 37
- Total Prize Pool: $370,000
- Number of Payouts: 6
- Winning Hand:Q♠ J♦

Event #3 Results
Place	Name	Prize
1st	(United States) Jonathan Depa	$133,200
2nd	(United States) Alex Foxen	$88,800
3rd	(United States) Erik Seidel	$59,200
4th	(Netherlands) Jorryt van Hoof	$37,000
5th	(United States) Ben Yu	$29,600
6th	(United States) Sam Soverel	$22,200

=== Event #4: $10,000 8-Game Mix ===
- 2-Day Event: November 7-8, 2019
- Number of Entrants: 45
- Total Prize Pool: $450,000
- Number of Payouts: 7
- Winning Hand:A♠ K♣ 10♦ 2♦ (Pot-Limit Omaha)

Event #4 Results
Place	Name	Prize
1st	(United States) Jared Bleznick	$153,000
2nd	(United States) Cary Katz	$99,000
3rd	(United States) Nick Schulman	$67,500
4th	(United States) Mike Gorodinsky	$45,000
5th	(United States) Jake Abdalla	$36,000
6th	(United States) Brandon Adams	$27,000
7th	(United States) George Wolff	$22,500

=== Event #5: $10,000 Big Bet Mix ===
- 2-Day Event: November 8-9, 2019
- Number of Entrants: 52
- Total Prize Pool: $520,000
- Number of Payouts: 8
- Winning Hand: A♥ 8♦ (No-Limit Hold'em)

Event #5 Results
Place	Name	Prize
1st	(France) Julien Martini	$166,400
2nd	(Australia) Kahle Burns	$109,200
3rd	(Netherlands) Jorryt van Hoof	$72,800
4th	(United States) Sam Soverel	$52,000
5th	(United Kingdom) Stephen Chidwick	$41,600
6th	(Brazil) Pedro Bromfman	$31,200
7th	(Brazil) Yuri Dzivielevski	$26,000
8th	(United States) Erik Seidel	$20,800

=== Event #6: $25,000 No-Limit Hold'em ===
- 2-Day Event: November 9-10, 2019
- Number of Entrants: 51
- Total Prize Pool: $1,275,000
- Number of Payouts: 8
- Winning Hand:8♠ 8♥

Event #6 Results
Place	Name	Prize
1st	(Canada) Kristen Bicknell	$408,000
2nd	(United States) Chance Kornuth	$267,500
3rd	(Bosnia and Herzegovina) Ali Imsirovic	$178,500
4th	(Hungary) Andras Nemeth	$127,500
5th	(United States) Ralph Wong	$102,000
6th	(United Kingdom) Ben Heath	$76,500
7th	(United States) David Stamm	$63,750
8th	(United States) Elio Fox	$51,000

=== Event #7: $25,000 Pot-Limit Omaha ===
- 2-Day Event: November 10-11, 2019
- Number of Entrants: 34
- Total Prize Pool: $850,000
- Number of Payouts: 5
- Winning Hand:J♠ 9♣ 6♥ 4♣

Event #7 Results
Place	Name	Prize
1st	(United States) Sam Soverel	$340,000
2nd	(United States) Sean Winter	$221,000
3rd	(United States) George Wolff	$136,000
4th	(Australia) Kahle Burns	$85,000
5th	(United States) Anthony Zinno	$68,000

=== Event #8: $10,000 No-Limit Hold'em ===
- 2-Day Event: November 11-12, 2019
- Number of Entrants: 41
- Total Prize Pool: $1,025,000
- Number of Payouts: 6
- Winning Hand:A♥ A♣

Event #8 Results
Place	Name	Prize
1st	(Spain) Sergi Reixach	$369,000
2nd	(United States) George Wolff	$246,000
3rd	(Turkey) Orpen Kisacikoglu	$164,000
4th	(United States) Sam Soverel	$102,500
5th	(Hungary) Andras Nemeth	$82,000
6th	(United States) Sean Winter	$61,500

=== Event #9: $25,000 No-Limit Hold'em ===
- 2-Day Event: November 12-13, 2019
- Number of Entrants: 49
- Total Prize Pool: $1,225,000
- Number of Payouts: 7
- Winning Hand: A♦ J♥

Event #9 Results
Place	Name	Prize
1st	(Australia) Kahle Burns	$416,500
2nd	(Bosnia and Herzegovina) Ali Imsirovic	$269,500
3rd	(United States) Sean Winter	$183,750
4th	(United States) Sam Soverel	$122,500
5th	(United States) Elio Fox	$98,000
6th	(United States) David Peters	$73,500
7th	(United States) Alex Foxen	$61,250

=== Event #10: $50,000 No-Limit Hold'em ===
- 2-Day Event: November 13-14, 2019
- Number of Entrants: 34
- Total Prize Pool: $1,700,000
- Number of Payouts: 5
- Winning Hand: Q♦ 10♥

Event #10 Results
Place	Name	Prize
1st	(United States) Sam Soverel	$680,000
2nd	(United States) Chris Hunichen	$442,000
3rd	(United States) Elio Fox	$272,000
4th	(United Kingdom) Stephen Chidwick	$170,000
5th	(United States) Seth Davies	$136,000
