= 2025 Poker Masters =

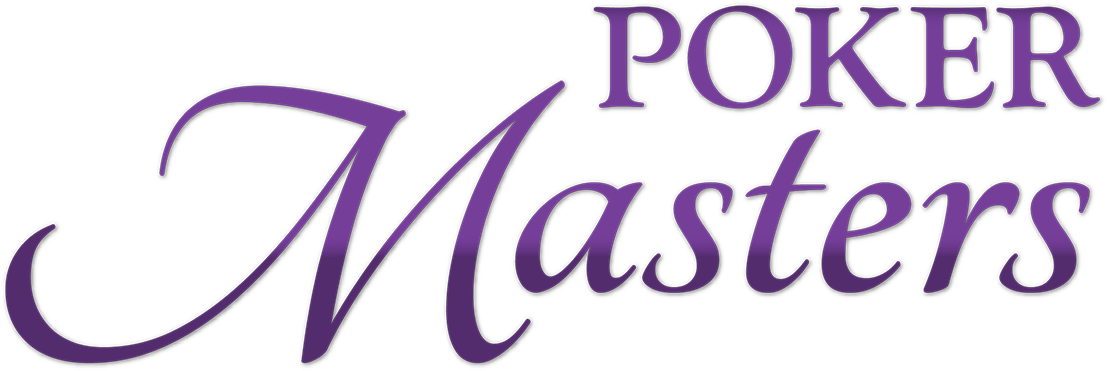
- Venue: PokerGO Studio at ARIA Resort & Casino
- Location: Las Vegas, Nevada
- Dates: September 19 to October 2, 2025

Champion
- (United States) David Coleman (Purple Jacket winner); (United States) Brandon Wilson (Main Event winner)

The 2025 Poker Masters is the tenth season of the Poker Masters. It will take place from September 19 to October 2, 2025, inside PokerGO Studio at ARIA Resort & Casino in Las Vegas, Nevada.

Brandon Wilson came into the final table of Event #10: $25,200 No-Limit Hold'em with nearly 35% of the chips in play and, despite a few hiccups along the way, emerged victorious to take home his first Purple Jacket trophy and $464,000 after a heads-up deal with David Coleman.

There are 10 events on the schedule and all the events are No-Limit Hold'em.

The 2025 Poker Masters has crowned its newest champion, with David Coleman topping the leaderboard to win the Poker Masters Purple Jacket and a $25,000 PGT Passport.

== Schedule ==
The schedule for the 2025 Poker Masters includes ten No-Limit Hold'em tournaments.

2025 Poker Masters
#	Event	Entrants	Prize Pool (US$)	Winner	Winning Hand	Prize (US$)	Runner-up	Losing hand	Results
1	$5,000 NLH $1M Showcase	239	$1,195,000	(United States) David Coleman	Q♠ 10♠	$270,000	(United States) Mitchell Halverson	5♠ 5♦	Results
2	$5,000 No-Limit Hold'em	130	$650,000	(United States) Michael Zulker	K♠ 6♠	$157,000	(United States) Mitchell Halverson	10♥ 10♣	Results
3	$10,000 No-Limit Hold'em	101	$1,010,000	(United States) Andrew Moreno	J♥ 10♦	$252,000	(United States) Brian Batt	J♦ 8♦	Results
4	$10,000 No-Limit Hold'em	112	$1,120,000	(United States) Darren Elias	Q♥ J♣	$280,000	(United States) David Chen	A♠ 2♣	Results
5	$10,000 No-Limit Hold'em	112	$1,120,000	(United States) David Rheem	7♦ 5♦	$280,000	(United States) Daniyal Gheba	6♥ 4♥	Results
6	$10,000 No-Limit Hold'em	109	$1,090,000	(United States) William Foxen	J♣ 8♠	$352,800	(Canada) Doug Lee	Q♣ 3♣	Results
7	$10,000 No-Limit Hold'em	77	$770,000	(United States) Cary Katz	Q♥ J♠	$223,000	(United States) Jared Hyman	K♠ 4♠	Results
8	$15,000 No-Limit Hold'em	67	$1,005,000	(Vietnam) Nguyen Le	K♥ 9♠	$301,000	(United States) William Foxen	K♠ 8♥	Results
9	$15,000 No-Limit Hold'em	67	$1,005,000	(United States) Justin Saliba	A♦ K♦	$301,000	(Canada) Kristen Foxen	9♦ 8♥	Results
10	$25,000 No-Limit Hold'em	63	$1,575,000	(United States) Brandon Wilson	Q♦ 10♥	$464,000	(United States) David Coleman	K♣ 3♣	Results

== Purple Jacket standings ==
The 2025 Poker Masters awarded the Purple Jacket and a $25,000 championship bonus to the player that accumulates the most PokerGO Tour points during the series.

Poker Masters Purple Jacket Standings
Rank	Name	Points	Earnings
1	(United States) David Coleman	492	$657,700
2	(United States) Alex Foxen	429	$468,000
3	(Canada) Doug Lee	374	$462,500
4	(United States) Chino Rheem	342	$367,300
5	(United States) Mitchell Halverson	330	$329,800

== Results ==
=== Event #1: $5,000 No-Limit Hold'em Poker Masters $1M Showcase ===
- 4-Day Event: September 19-22, 2025
- Number of Entrants: 239
- Guaranteed Prize Pool: $1,000,000
- Total Prize Pool: $1,195,000
- Number of Payouts: 35
- Winning Hand: Q♠ 10♠

Final Table
Place	Name	Prize
1st	(United States) David Coleman	$270,000
2nd	(United States) Mitchell Halverson	$185,000
3rd	(United States) Andrew Ostapchenko	$120,000
4th	(United States) Stephen Song	$75,000
5th	(United States) Spencer Champlin	$60,000
6th	(Canada) Doug Lee	$49,000

=== Event #2: $5,000 No-Limit Hold'em ===
- 2-Day Event: September 22-23, 2025
- Number of Entrants: 130
- Total Prize Pool: $650,000
- Number of Payouts: 19
- Winning Hand: K♠ 6♠

Final Table
Place	Name	Prize
1st	(United States) Michael Zulker	$157,000
2nd	(United States) Mitchell Halverson	$100,000
3rd	(United States) Paul Jager	$71,000
4th	(United States) Wayne Nowak	$52,000
5th	(United States) Aaron Messmer	$39,000
6th	(United States) Michael Berk	$32,500

=== Event #3: $10,000 No-Limit Hold'em ===
- 2-Day Event: September 23-24, 2025
- Number of Entrants: 101
- Total Prize Pool: $1,010,000
- Number of Payouts: 15
- Winning Hand: J♥ 10♦

Final Table
Place	Name	Prize
1st	(United States) Andrew Moreno	$252,000
2nd	(United States) Brian Batt	$171,700
3rd	(United States) Samuel Laskowitz	$116,700
4th	(United States) Jeremiah Williams	$90,900
5th	(United States) Matthew Wantman	$65,600
6th	(United States) John Riordan	$50,500

=== Event #4: $10,000 No-Limit Hold'em ===
- 2-Day Event: September 24-25, 2025
- Number of Entrants: 112
- Total Prize Pool: $1,120,000
- Number of Payouts: 16
- Winning Hand: Q♥ J♣

Final Table
Place	Name	Prize
1st	(United States) Darren Elias	$280,000
2nd	(United States) David Chen	$185,000
3rd	(United States) Neil Warren	$129,000
4th	(United States) Stephen Song	$100,500
5th	(United States) Adam Hendrix	$72,500
6th	(United States) Victoria Livschitz	$56,200

=== Event #5: $10,000 No-Limit Hold'em ===
- 2-Day Event: September 25-26, 2025
- Number of Entrants: 112
- Total Prize Pool: $1,120,000
- Number of Payouts: 16
- Winning Hand: 7♦ 5♦

Final Table
Place	Name	Prize
1st	(United States) David Rheem	$280,000
2nd	(United States) Daniyal Gheba	$185,000
3rd	(Russia) Anatoly Nikitin	$129,000
4th	(United States) Stephen Song	$100,500
5th	(United States) John Riordan	$72,500
6th	(United States) Andrew Lichtenberger	$56,200

=== Event #6: $10,000 No-Limit Hold'em ===
- 2-Day Event: September 26-27, 2025
- Number of Entrants: 109
- Total Prize Pool: $1,090,000
- Number of Payouts: 17
- Winning Hand: J♣ 8♠

Final Table
Place	Name	Prize
1st	(United States) William Foxen	$272,000
2nd	(Canada) Doug Lee	$180,000
3rd	(United States) Martin Zamani	$125,000
4th	(United States) Andrew Lichtenberger	$98,000
5th	(United States) RJ Sullivan	$71,000
6th	(United States) Bin Weng	$55,000

=== Event #7: $10,000 No-Limit Hold'em ===
- 3-Day Event: September 27-29, 2025
- Number of Entrants: 77
- Total Prize Pool: $770,000
- Number of Payouts: 11
- Winning Hand: Q♥ J♠

Final Table
Place	Name	Prize
1st	(United States) Cary Katz	$223,000
2nd	(United States) Jared Hyman	$146,500
3rd	(Japan) Masato Yokosawa	$104,000
4th	(United States) John Riordan	$73,000
5th	(United States) Daniel Sepiol	$53,800
6th	(United States) Matthew McEwan	$38,500

=== Event #8: $15,000 No-Limit Hold'em ===
- 2-Day Event: September 29-30, 2025
- Number of Entrants: 67
- Total Prize Pool: $1,005,000
- Number of Payouts: 10
- Winning Hand: K♥ 9♠

Final Table
Place	Name	Prize
1st	(Vietnam) Nguyen Le	$301,000
2nd	(United States) William Foxen	$196,000
3rd	(United States) Jeremy Ausmus	$135,500
4th	(United States) Joey Weissman	$100,500
5th	(United States) Brian Batt	$75,500
6th	(United States) Jesse Lonis	$55,500

=== Event #9: $15,000 No-Limit Hold'em ===
- 2-Day Event: September 30-October 1, 2025
- Number of Entrants: 67
- Total Prize Pool: $1,005,000
- Number of Payouts: 10
- Winning Hand: A♦ K♦

Final Table
Place	Name	Prize
1st	(United States) Justin Saliba	$301,000
2nd	(Canada) Kristen Foxen	$196,000
3rd	(United States) Jesse Lonis	$135,500
4th	(United States) Chris Hunichen	$100,500
5th	(United States) Cary Katz	$75,500
6th	(United States) Samuel Laskowitz	$55,500

=== Event #10: $25,000 No-Limit Hold'em ===
- 2-Day Event: October 1-2, 2025
- Number of Entrants: 63
- Total Prize Pool: $1,575,000
- Number of Payouts: 9
- Winning Hand: Q♦ 10♥

Final Table
Place	Name	Prize
1st	(United States) Brandon Wilson	$464,000
2nd	(United States) David Coleman	$355,000
3rd	(Canada) Doug Lee	$220,500
4th	(United States) Dylan Linde	$157,500
5th	(United States) Nick Schulman	$118,100
6th	(United States) Jason Koon	$86,600
