= 2024 Poker Masters =

Series of poker tournaments

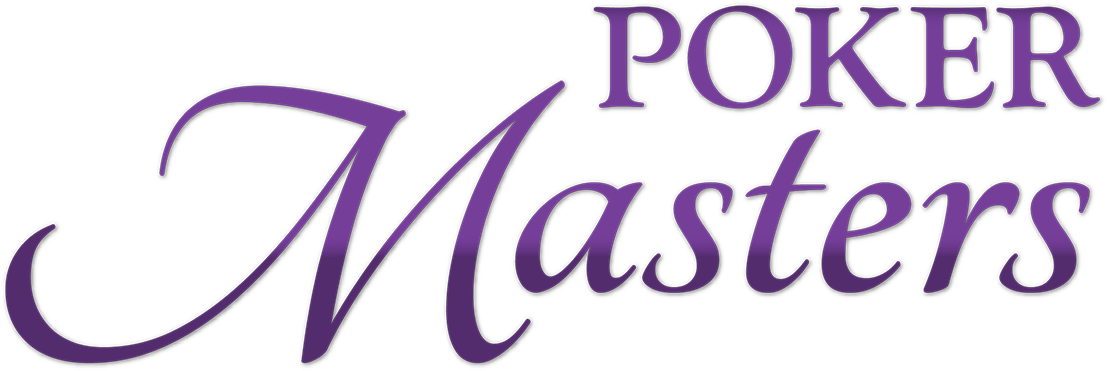
- Venue: PokerGO Studio at ARIA Resort & Casino; Presented by PokerStars - NAPT
- Location: Las Vegas, Nevada
- Dates: September 10-19, 2024

Champion
- (United States) James Collopy (Purple Jacket winner); (United States) Ben Tollerene (Main Event winner)

The 2024 Poker Masters is the ninth season of the Poker Masters. It will take place from September 10-19, 2024, will be presented by the PokerStars North American Poker Tour (NAPT) from the PokerGO Studio at ARIA Resort & Casino in Las Vegas, Nevada. The 2024 Poker Masters champion will now receive a coveted Gold Pass in addition to the distinguished Purple Jacket and a $25,000 PGT Passport bonus. The Gold Pass, valued at $10,000, includes entry into the NAPT Las Vegas $5,300 Main Event in November, $2,900 for hotel accommodations, and $1,800 for expenses. The NAPT Las Vegas Main Event, scheduled for November 5-10, 2024, at Resorts World Las Vegas, features a $3,000,000 prize pool guarantee.

There are 8 events on the schedule and all the events are No-Limit Hold'em. Buy-ins range from $5,100 to the $25,200 Main Event. Final tables will be streamed on PokerGO.

Jim Collopy cashed four consecutive times to earn the Purple Jacket as the series champion.

== Schedule ==
The schedule for the 2024 Poker Masters includes ten No-Limit Hold'em tournaments.

2024 Poker Masters
#	Event	Entrants	Prize Pool (US$)	Winner	Winning Hand	Prize (US$)	Runner-up	Losing hand	Results
1	$5,000 No-Limit Hold'em	131	$655,000	(United States) Spencer Champlin	A♠ Q♠	$160,475	(Germany) Jessica Vierling	A♣ J♠	Results
2	$10,000 No-Limit Hold'em	100	$1,000,000	(United States) Jeremy Becker	Q♠ 10♥	$255,000	(United States) Michael Moncek	A♥ 7♦	Results
3	$10,000 No-Limit Hold'em	94	$940,000	(United States) Justin Zaki	4♥ 4♦	$244,400	(United States) Jeremy Ausmus	A♠ Q♣	Results
4	$10,000 No-Limit Hold'em	81	$810,000	(United States) Jonathan Little	A♦ J♠	$226,800	(United States) Harvey Castro	10♠ 9♦	Results
5	$10,000 No-Limit Hold'em	75	$750,000	(United States) David Chen	J♠ 9♠	$217,500	(United States) James Collopy	A♣ 5♥	Results
6	$15,000 No-Limit Hold'em	84	$1,260,000	(United States) Isaac Haxton	6♦ 2♣	$352,800	(United States) James Collopy	10♠ 9♠	Results
7	$15,000 No-Limit Hold'em	76	$1,140,000	(United States) Brock Wilson	K♦ 6♦	$330,600	(United States) Michael Moncek	Q♣ 4♣	Results
8	$25,000 No-Limit Hold'em	68	$1,700,000	(United States) Benjamin Tollerene	A♠ 6♠	$510,000	(United States) Taylor von Kriegenbergh	K♦ J♥	Results

== Purple Jacket standings ==
The 2024 Poker Masters will award the Purple Jacket and a $25,000 championship bonus to the player that accumulates the most PokerGO Tour points during the series and a PokerStars Gold Pass for his victory. Jim Collopy finish second twice, third, and sixth at four final tables, accumulating 522 points to top the leaderboard.

Poker Masters Purple Jacket Standings
Rank	Name	Points	Earnings
1	(United States) Jim Collopy	522	$521,600
2	(United States) Isaac Haxton	458	$457,000
3	(United States) Jeremy Becker	449	$448,800
4	(United States) Michael Moncek	382	$381,600
5	(United States) Brock Wilson	355	$354,900

== Results ==
=== Event #1: $5,000 No-Limit Hold'em ===
- 2-Day Event: September 10-11, 2024
- Number of Entrants: 131
- Total Prize Pool: $655,000
- Number of Payouts: 19
- Winning Hand: A♠ Q♠

Final Table
Place	Name	Prize
1st	(United States) Spencer Champlin	$160,475
2nd	(Germany) Jessica Vierling	$98,250
3rd	(United States) Dylan Linde	$72,050
4th	(United States) Dan Shak	$52,400
5th	(United States) Zachary Grech	$39,300
6th	(United States) Nicholas Seward	$32,750

=== Event #2: $10,000 No-Limit Hold'em ===
- 2-Day Event: September 11-12, 2024
- Number of Entrants: 100
- Total Prize Pool: $1,000,000
- Number of Payouts: 15
- Winning Hand: Q♠ 10♥

Final Table
Place	Name	Prize
1st	(United States) Jeremy Becker	$255,000
2nd	(United States) Michael Moncek	$165,000
3rd	(United States) Sean Winter	$115,000
4th	(United States) Daniel Sepiol	$90,000
5th	(United States) Nicholas Seward	$65,000
6th	(China) Tony Lin	$50,000

=== Event #3: $10,000 No-Limit Hold'em ===
- 2-Day Event: September 12, 13, 2024
- Number of Entrants: 94
- Total Prize Pool: $940,000
- Number of Payouts: 14
- Winning Hand: 4♥ 4♦

Final Table
Place	Name	Prize
1st	(United States) Justin Zaki	$244,400
2nd	(United States) Jeremy Ausmus	$155,100
3rd	(United States) Michael Brinkenhoff	$112,800
4th	(United States) Victoria Livschitz	$84,600
5th	(United States) Cary Katz	$65,800
6th	(United States) James Collopy	$47,000

=== Event #4: $10,000 No-Limit Hold'em ===
- 2-Day Event: September 13-14, 2024
- Number of Entrants: 81
- Total Prize Pool: $810,000
- Number of Payouts: 12
- Winning Hand: A♦ J♠

Final Table
Place	Name	Prize
1st	(United States) Jonathan Little	$226,800
2nd	(United States) Harvey Castro	$145,800
3rd	(United States) James Collopy	$105,300
4th	(United States) Sam Soverel	$76,950
5th	(United States) Wayne Nowak	$56,700
6th	(Canada) Isaac Haxton	$40,500

=== Event #5: $10,000 No-Limit Hold'em ===
- 2-Day Event: September 14-16, 2024
- Number of Entrants: 75
- Total Prize Pool: $750,000
- Number of Payouts: 11
- Winning Hand: J♠ 9♠

Final Table
Place	Name	Prize
1st	(United States) David Chen	$217,500
2nd	(United States) James Collopy	$142,500
3rd	(United States) David Rheem	$101,250
4th	(United States) Filipp Khavin	$71,250
5th	(United States) Samuel Laskowitz	$52,500
6th	(Germany) Isaac Haxton	$37,500

=== Event #6: $15,000 No-Limit Hold'em ===
- 2-Day Event: September 16-17, 2024
- Number of Entrants: 84
- Total Prize Pool: $1,260,000
- Number of Payouts: 12
- Winning Hand: 6♦ 2♣

Final Table
Place	Name	Prize
1st	(United States) Isaac Haxton	$352,800
2nd	(United States) James Collopy	$226,800
3rd	(United States) Jeremy Becker	$163,800
4th	(United States) Aram Zobian	$119,700
5th	(United States) Sean Winter	$88,200
6th	(United States) Dylan Linde	$63,000

=== Event #7: $15,000 No-Limit Hold'em ===
- 2-Day Event: September 17-18, 2024
- Number of Entrants: 76
- Total Prize Pool: $1,140,000
- Number of Payouts: 11
- Winning Hand: K♦ 6♦

Final Table
Place	Name	Prize
1st	(United States) Brock Wilson	$330,600
2nd	(United States) Michael Moncek	$216,600
3rd	(United States) John Riordan	$153,900
4th	(United States) David Stamm	$108,300
5th	(United States) Seth Davies	$79,800
6th	(Canada) Kristen Foxen	$57,000

=== Event #8: $25,000 No-Limit Hold'em ===
- 2-Day Event: September 18-19, 2024
- Number of Entrants: 68
- Total Prize Pool: $1,700,000
- Number of Payouts: 10
- Winning Hand: A♠ 6♠

Final Table
Place	Name	Prize
1st	(United States) Benjamin Tollerene	$510,000
2nd	(United States) Taylor von Kriegenbergh	$331,500
3rd	(United States) Andrew Lichtenberger	$229,500
4th	(United States) Sam Soverel	$170,000
5th	(United States) Aram Zobian	$127,500
6th	(United States) Filipp Khavin	$93,500
