= Poker Masters =

Series of poker tournaments

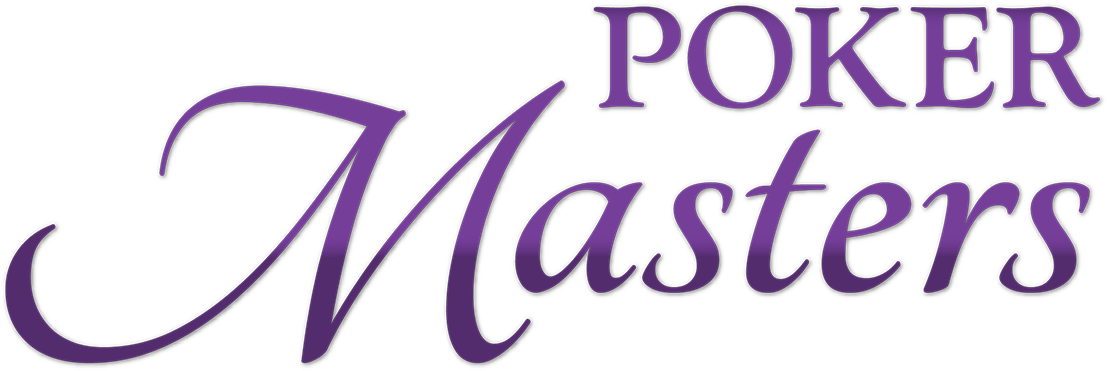
- Sport: Poker
- Founded: September 2017
- Country: United States
- Venue: PokerGO Studio at Aria Resort and Casino
- Most recent champions: (United States) James Collopy (Purple Jacket winner); (United States) Ben Tollerene (Main Event winner)
- Sponsor: PokerGO
- Official website: PokerMasters.com

The Poker Masters is a series of high-stakes poker tournaments. Created in 2017, it takes place at ARIA Resort and Casino in Las Vegas, Nevada, and online at partypoker. Final tables are streamed on PokerGO, and the player who accumulates the most points during the series wins the Purple Jacket.

== History ==
The first season took place in September 2017 and had five events on the schedule. Steffen Sontheimer won the $100,000 Main Event and was awarded the Purple Jacket for accumulating the most winnings after winning two events and making five final tables. For the second season, a points system was introduced to award the Purple Jacket. There were seven events on the schedule in September 2019, and David Peters won the $100,000 Main Event, while Ali Imsirovic was awarded the Purple Jacket by winning two events and making three final tables.

The third season was held in November 2019 and had ten events on the schedule. Sam Soverel won the $50,000 Main Event and was awarded the Purple Jacket after winning two events and making seven final tables. Due to the COVID-19 pandemic, the fourth season was held online at partypoker in April 2020 and had 30 events on the schedule. Linus Loeliger won the $50,000 Main Event, while Alexandros Kolonias was awarded the Purple Jacket with 11 cashes and over $1.2 million in winnings.

The fifth season was held in June 2020 on partypoker and had 16 events on the schedule that were all Pot-Limit Omaha. Isaac Haxton won the $50,000 Main Event, while Eelis Pärssinen was awarded the Purple Jacket by winning one event and cashing six times.

The sixth season was held in September 2021 at the PokerGO Studio and had 12 events on the schedule. Australian Michael Addamo won the final two events of the series including the $50,000 Main Event and was awarded the Purple Jacket and $50,000 championship bonus.

The seventh season was held in September 2022 at the PokerGO Studio and had 10 events on the schedule. Sean Winter cashed in two events including a win in Event #9 and was awarded the Purple Jacket. Jason Koon won the $50,000 Main Event.

The eighth season was held in September 2023 at the PokerGO Studio and had 10 events on the schedule. Stephen Chidwick cashed in four events including winning Event #8 and was awarded the Purple Jacket. Jonathan Jaffe won the $50,000 Main Event.

The ninth season was held in September 2024 at the PokerGO Studio and had 8 events on the schedule. James Collopy cashed in four events and was awarded the Purple Jacket. Ben Tollerene won the $25,000 Main Event.

The tenth season was held in September 2025 at the PokerGO Studio and had 10 events on the schedule. David Coleman cashed in three events and was awarded the Purple Jacket. Brandon Wilson won the $25,200 Main Event.

== Poker Masters Schedule ==
The 2017 Poker Masters was held at ARIA Resort & Casino, and for 2018 and 2019, the event played out from the PokerGO Studio. Due to the COVID-19 pandemic, Poker Masters would move online to partypoker where there would be two series for the year. The second series would be unique with every event being Pot-Limit Omaha tournaments only.

The 2021 Poker Masters was announced by PokerGO in April 2021 with a 12-event schedule returning to the PokerGO Studio. The 2022 Poker Masters was announced by PokerGO in July 2022 with a 12-event schedule but was reduced to 10 events mid-series.

The 2024 Poker Masters take place from September 10-19, 2024, was presented by the PokerStars North American Poker Tour (NAPT) from the PokerGO Studio at ARIA Resort & Casino in Las Vegas, Nevada.

In 2025 the Poker Masters will be held inside the PokerGO Studio at ARIA Resort & Casino in Las Vegas, Nevada, and run from September 19 to October 2, 2025.

Poker Masters Schedule
Dates	Series Name	Location	Events
September 13-20, 2017	2017 Poker Masters	ARIA Resort & Casino	5
September 8-15, 2018	2018 Poker Masters	PokerGO Studio at ARIA Resort & Casino	7
November 4-14, 2019	2019 Poker Masters	PokerGO Studio at ARIA Resort & Casino	10
April 12-26, 2020	2020 Poker Masters Online	partypoker (online)	30
June 21-29, 2020	2020 Poker Masters Online PLO Series	partypoker (online)	16
September 7-19, 2021	2021 Poker Masters	PokerGO Studio at ARIA Resort & Casino	12
September 21-October 3, 2022	2022 Poker Masters	PokerGO Studio at ARIA Resort & Casino	10
September 14-26, 2023	2023 Poker Masters	PokerGO Studio at ARIA Resort & Casino	10
September 10-19, 2024	2024 Poker Masters	PokerGO Studio at ARIA Resort & Casino	8
September 19-October 2, 2025	2025 Poker Masters	PokerGO Studio at ARIA Resort & Casino	10

== Purple Jacket winners ==
The 2017 Poker Masters awarded the Purple Jacket based on total winnings for the series, but since the 2018 Poker Masters, the Purple Jacket has been awarded based on the points system used by the High Roller of the Year scoring system. For the 2021 Poker Masters, the PokerGO Tour points system was used to decide the Purple Jacket winner. The winner also received a $50,000 championship bonus.

Poker Masters Purple Jacket Winners
Series	Events	Winner	Wins	Final Tables	Cashes	Earnings (US$)	Points	Runner-up	Points
2017 Poker Masters	5	(Germany) Steffen Sontheimer	2	5	4	$2,733,000	--	(United States) Bryn Kenney	--
2018 Poker Masters	7	(Bosnia and Herzegovina) Ali Imsirovic	2	3	3	$1,288,600	660	(United States) David Peters	650
2019 Poker Masters	10	(United States) Sam Soverel	2	7	7	$1,396,800	1,160	(Australia) Kahle Burns	630
2020 Poker Masters Online	30	(Greece) Alexandros Kolonias	2	5	11	$1,266,296	1,191	(Russia) Artur Martirosian	1,048
2020 Poker Masters Online PLO Series	16	(Finland) Eelis Pärssinen	1	6	6	$735,359	625	(Hungary) Andras Nemeth	624
2021 Poker Masters	12	(Australia) Michael Addamo	2	2	2	$1,840,000	808	(United States) Nick Petrangelo	402
2022 Poker Masters	10	(United States) Sean Winter	1	2	2	$777,000	466	(United States) Jason Koon	449
2023 Poker Masters	10	(United Kingdom) Stephen Chidwick	1	4	4	$1,109,000	688	(Lithuania) Vladas Tamasauskas	506
2024 Poker Masters	8	(United States) James Collopy	0	4	4	$521,600	522	(United States) Isaac Haxton	458
2025 Poker Masters	10	(United States) David Coleman	1	2	3	$657,700	492	(United States) Alex Foxen	429

== Main Event winners ==
Poker Masters Main Event Winners
Series	Entrants	Winner	Winning Hand	Prize (US$)	Runner-up	Losing hand
2017 Poker Masters	36	(Germany) Steffen Sontheimer	Q♥ Q♦	$1,512,000	(Germany) Christian Christner	2♣ 2♦
2018 Poker Masters	25	(United States) David Peters	K♦ 7♣	$1,150,000	(United States) Dan Smith	A♦ 7♦
2019 Poker Masters	34	(United States) Sam Soverel	Q♦ 10♥	$1,512,000	(United States) Chris Hunichen	2♠ 2♥
2020 Poker Masters Online	77	(Switzerland) Linus Loeliger	9♦ 6♦	$1,097,250	(Venezuela) Giuseppe Iadisernia	4♠ 4♥
2020 Poker Masters Online PLO Series	29	(United States) Isaac Haxton	A♦ J♦ 8♥ 3♣	$675,000	(Lithuania) Grazvydas Kontautas	10♥ 10♦ 3♦ 2♣
2021 Poker Masters	29	(Australia) Michael Addamo	7♥ 3♣	$1,160,000	(United States) Nick Petrangelo	K♣ 8♦
2022 Poker Masters	37	(United States) Jason Koon	K♥ 6♥	$666,000	(Spain) Adrián Mateos	A♠ 2♠
2023 Poker Masters	42	(United States) Jonathan Jaffe	A♦ 3♥	$756,000	(United Kingdom) Stephen Chidwick	A♠ 9♦
2024 Poker Masters	68	(United States) Benjamin Tollerene	A♠ 6♠	$510,000	(United States) Taylor von Kriegenbergh	K♦ J♥
2025 Poker Masters	63	(United States) Brandon Wilson	Q♦ 10♥	$464,000	(United States) David Coleman	K♣ 3♣

== Event wins ==
Information correct as of September 29, 2023.

Poker Masters Event Wins
Total wins	Player	Live	Online
4	(Bosnia and Herzegovina) Ali Imsirovic	2	2
4	(Hungary) Andras Nemeth	0	4
3	(Australia) Michael Addamo	2	1
3	(Finland) Jens Kyllönen	0	3
2	(Germany) Steffen Sontheimer	2	0
2	(United States) David Peters	2	0
2	(United States) Sam Soverel	2	0
2	(United States) Brandon Adams	2	0
2	(Australia) Kahle Burns	1	1
2	(Finland) Pauli Ayras	0	2
2	(Canada) Pascal Lefrancois	0	2
2	(Greece) Alexandros Kolonias	0	2
2	(Italy) Mustapha Kanit	0	2
2	(Switzerland) Linus Loeliger	0	2
2	(United States) Isaac Haxton	1	1
2	(Finland) Eelis Pärssinen	0	2
2	(Sweden) Bengt Sonnert	0	2
2	(United States) Jason Koon	1	1
2	(United States) Adam Hendrix	2	0
2	(United States) Nick Schulman	2	0
2	(United Kingdom) Stephen Chidwick	2	0
2	(United States) Andrew Lichtenberger	2	0
2	(Lithuania) Vladas Tamasauskas	2	0
1	(United States) Darren Elias	1	0
1	(United States) Chino Rheem	1	0
1	(Turkey) Orpen Kisacikoglu	1	0
1	(United States) Justin Bonomo	1	0
1	(United States) Jonathan Jaffe	1	0
1	(United States) Jeremy Ausmus	1	0
1	(United States) Ethan Yau	1	0
1	(United States) Bryn Kenney	1	0
1	(United States) Keith Lehr	1	0
1	(United States) Isaac Baron	1	0
1	(Canada) Daniel Negreanu	1	0
1	(Belarus) Mikita Badziakouski	1	0
1	(United States) Miles Rampel	1	0
1	(United States) Chris Brewer	1	0
1	(United States) Maxx Coleman	1	0
1	(United States) Ryan Laplante	1	0
1	(United States) Shannon Shorr	1	0
1	(United States) Sean Perry	1	0
1	(United States) Martin Zamani	1	0
1	(United Kingdom) Tony Bloom	1	0
1	(United States) Nick Guagenti	1	0
1	(Netherlands) Ronald Keijzer	1	0
1	(United States) Brock Wilson	1	0
1	(United States) Jonathan Depa	1	0
1	(United States) Jared Bleznick	1	0
1	(France) Julian Martini	1	0
1	(Canada) Kristen Bicknell	1	0
1	(Spain) Sergi Reixach	1	0
1	(Finland) Elias Talvitie	0	1
1	(Germany) Tobias Ziegler	0	1
1	(United States) Alex Foxen	0	1
1	(Canada) Mike Watson	0	1
1	(Finland) Joni Jouhkimainen	0	1
1	(Hungary) Laszlo Bujtas	0	1
1	(Netherlands) Luuk Gieles	0	1
1	(Canada) Timothy Adams	0	1
1	(United States) Sean Winter	1	0
1	(United States) Steve O'Dwyer	0	1
1	(United States) Dan Smith	0	1
1	(Canada) Sebastian Lewin	0	1
1	(Finland) Samuel Vousden	0	1
1	(Republic of Ireland) Mark Davis	0	1
1	(Italy) Marcello Marigliano	0	1
1	(Denmark) Jesper Hougaard	0	1
1	(Finland) Sami Kelopuro	0	1
1	(Finland) Aku Joentausta	0	1
1	(United States) Chance Kornuth	0	1
1	(Denmark) Alexander Petersen	0	1
