= 2018 Poker Masters =

Series of poker tournaments

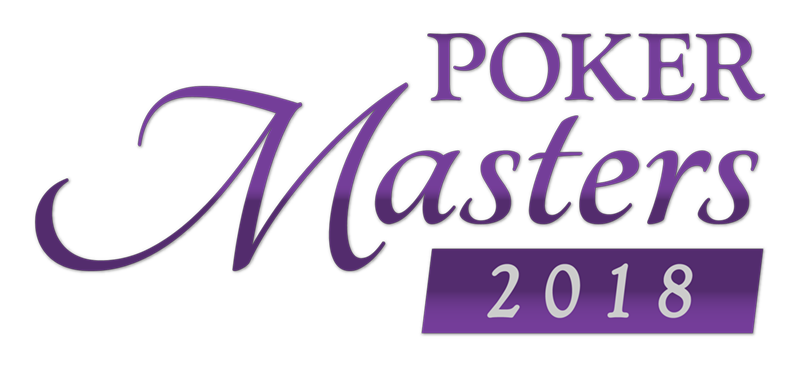
- Venue: PokerGO Studio at ARIA Resort & Casino
- Location: Las Vegas, Nevada
- Dates: September 8-15, 2018

Champion
- (Bosnia and Herzegovina) Ali Imsirovic (Purple Jacket winner); (United States) David Peters (Main Event winner)

The 2018 Poker Masters was the second season of the Poker Masters. It took place from September 8-15, 2018, from the PokerGO Studio at ARIA Resort & Casino in Las Vegas, Nevada. The event was sponsored by Poker Central, and every final table was streamed on PokerGO. There were seven events on the schedule including five No-Limit Hold'em tournaments, along with a Pot-Limit Omaha and Short Deck event. Buy-ins ranged from $10,000 to the $100,000 Main Event.

The Main Event was won by America's David Peters, and the Poker Masters Purple Jacket was awarded to Bosnia and Herzegovina's Ali Imsirovic.

== Schedule ==
The schedule for the 2018 Poker Masters included five No-Limit Hold'em tournaments, and both a Pot-Limit Omaha and Short Deck event. The first six events lasted two days with the first day ending once the final table was down to six players. Those players returned the next day to resume play with the action streamed on PokerGO. The Main Event was a $100,000 buy-in and played out over three days with the final two days streamed on PokerGO.

2018 Poker Masters
#	Event	Entrants	Prize Pool (US$)	Winner	Winning Hand	Prize (US$)	Runner-up	Losing hand	Results
1	$10,000 No-Limit Hold'em	69	$690,000	(United States) David Peters	K♦ K♣	$193,200	(United States) Brian Green	8♠ 8♦	Results
2	$25,000 No-Limit Hold'em	50	$1,250,000	(United States) Brandon Adams	A♣ 9♥	$400,000	(United States) Jared Jaffee	K♣ 5♠	Results
3	$25,000 Pot-Limit Omaha	37	$925,000	(United States) Keith Lehr	K♠ J♥ 8♦ 5♦	$333,000	(United States) Jonathan Depa	7♥ 4♥ 3♠ 2♠	Results
4	$10,000 Short Deck	55	$550,000	(United States) Isaac Haxton	A♣ Q♦	$176,000	(United States) Maurice Hawkins	9♦ 7♦	Results
5	$25,000 No-Limit Hold'em	66	$1,650,000	(Bosnia and Herzegovina) Ali Imsirovic	5♠ 5♥	$462,000	(United States) Ben Yu	A♣ 6♦	Results
6	$50,000 No-Limit Hold'em	47	$2,350,000	(Bosnia and Herzegovina) Ali Imsirovic	K♣ Q♥	$799,000	(Germany) Koray Aldemir	9♥ 8♦	Results
7	$100,000 No-Limit Hold'em Main Event	25	$2,500,000	(United States) David Peters	K♦ 7♠	$1,150,000	(United States) Dan Smith	A♦ 7♦	Results

== Purple Jacket standings ==
The 2018 Poker Masters awarded the Purple Jacket to the player that accumulated the most points during the series unlike in 2017 when the winner was determined by the most winnings. Bosnia and Herzegovina's Ali Imsirovic won two events, and cashed three times on his way to accumulating $1,288,600 in winnings. Imsirovic accumulated 660 points and was awarded the Purple Jacket.

Poker Masters Purple Jacket Standings
Rank	Name	Earnings	Points
1	(Bosnia and Herzegovina) Ali Imsirovic	$1,288,600	660
2	(United States) David Peters	$1,343,200	650
3	(United States) Brandon Adams	$543,000	510
4	(United States) Isaac Haxton	$309,900	480
5	(United States) Jake Schindler	$575,000	390
6	(Germany) Koray Aldemir	$917,000	385
7	(United States) Ben Yu	$478,000	360
8	(United States) Dan Smith	$749,500	305
9	(United States) Keith Lehr	$333,000	300
10	(United States) Jonathan Depa	$249,500	270

== Results ==
=== Event #1: $10,000 No-Limit Hold'em ===
- 2-Day Event: September 7-8, 2018
- Number of Entrants: 69
- Total Prize Pool: $690,000
- Number of Payouts: 10
- Winning Hand: K♦ K♣

Event #1 Results
Place	Name	Prize
1st	(United States) David Peters	$193,200
2nd	(United States) Brian Green	$138,000
3rd	(Germany) Rainer Kempe	$89,700
4th	(United States) Brandon Adams	$69,000
5th	(United States) Cord Garcia	$55,200
6th	(United States) Isaac Haxton	$41,400
7th	(United States) David Eldridge	$34,500
8th	(Bosnia and Herzegovina) Ali Imsirovic	$27,600
9th	(United States) Cary Katz	$20,700
10th	(Austria) Matthias Eibinger	$20,700

=== Event #2: $25,000 No-Limit Hold'em ===
- 2-Day Event: September 8-9, 2018
- Number of Entrants: 50
- Total Prize Pool: $1,250,000
- Number of Payouts: 8
- Winning Hand: A♣ 9♥

Event #2 Results
Place	Name	Prize
1st	(United States) Brandon Adams	$400,000
2nd	(United States) Jared Jaffee	$262,000
3rd	(United States) Jake Schindler	$175,000
4th	(United States) Bill Klein	$125,000
5th	(United States) Jason Koon	$100,000
6th	(Canada) Daniel Negreanu	$75,000
7th	(Germany) Dominik Nitsche	$62,500
8th	(United States) Cary Katz	$50,000

=== Event #3: $25,000 Pot-Limit Omaha ===
- 2-Day Event: September 9-10, 2018
- Number of Entrants: 37
- Total Prize Pool: $925,000
- Number of Payouts: 6
- Winning Hand: K♠ J♥ 8♦ 5♦

Event #3 Results
Place	Name	Prize
1st	(United States) Keith Lehr	$333,000
2nd	(United States) Jonathan Depa	$222,000
3rd	(United States) Ben Yu	$148,000
4th	(United States) Isaac Haxton	$92,500
5th	(United States) Brandon Adams	$74,000
6th	(United States) Dan Shak	$55,500

=== Event #4: $10,000 Short Deck ===
- 2-Day Event: September 10-11, 2018
- Number of Entrants: 55
- Total Prize Pool: $550,000
- Number of Payouts: 8
- Winning Hand: A♣ Q♦

Event #4 Results
Place	Name	Prize
1st	(United States) Isaac Haxton	$176,000
2nd	(United States) Maurice Hawkins	$115,500
3rd	(United States) Ryan Tosoc	$77,000
4th	(United States) Andrew Robl	$55,000
5th	(United States) Cary Katz	$44,000
6th	(Germany) Dominik Nitsche	$33,000
7th	(United States) Jonathan Depa	$27,500
8th	(United States) Jason Koon	$22,000

=== Event #5: $25,000 No-Limit Hold'em ===
- 2-Day Event: September 11-12, 2018
- Number of Entrants: 66
- Total Prize Pool: $1,650,000
- Number of Payouts: 10
- Winning Hand: 5♠ 5♥

Event #5 Results
Place	Name	Prize
1st	(Bosnia and Herzegovina) Ali Imsirovic	$462,000
2nd	(United States) Ben Yu	$330,000
3rd	(United States) Brian Rast	$214,500
4th	(United States) Jake Schindler	$165,000
5th	(United States) Jason Koon	$132,000
6th	(Canada) Daniel Negreanu	$99,000
7th	(United States) Elio Fox	$82,500
8th	(United States) Dan Shak	$66,000
9th	(United States) Bryn Kenney	$49,500
10th	(United States) Dan Smith	$49,500

=== Event #6: $50,000 No-Limit Hold'em ===
- 2-Day Event: September 12-13, 2018
- Number of Entrants: 47
- Total Prize Pool: $2,350,000
- Number of Payouts: 7
- Winning Hand: K♣ Q♥

Event #6 Results
Place	Name	Prize
1st	(Bosnia and Herzegovina) Ali Imsirovic	$799,000
2nd	(Germany) Koray Aldemir	$517,000
3rd	(United States) Seth Davies	$352,500
4th	(United States) Jake Schindler	$235,000
5th	(United States) Sam Soverel	$188,000
6th	(United States) Justin Bonomo	$141,000
7th	(United States) Bryn Kenney	$117,500

=== Event #7: $100,000 No-Limit Hold'em Main Event ===
- 3-Day Event: September 13-15, 2018
- Number of Entrants: 25
- Total Prize Pool: $2,500,000
- Number of Payouts: 4
- Winning Hand: K♦ 7♠

Event #7 Results
Place	Name	Prize
1st	(United States) David Peters	$1,150,000
2nd	(United States) Dan Smith	$700,000
3rd	(Germany) Koray Aldemir	$400,000
4th	(United States) Bryn Kenney	$250,000
