= 2023 Poker Masters =

Series of poker tournaments

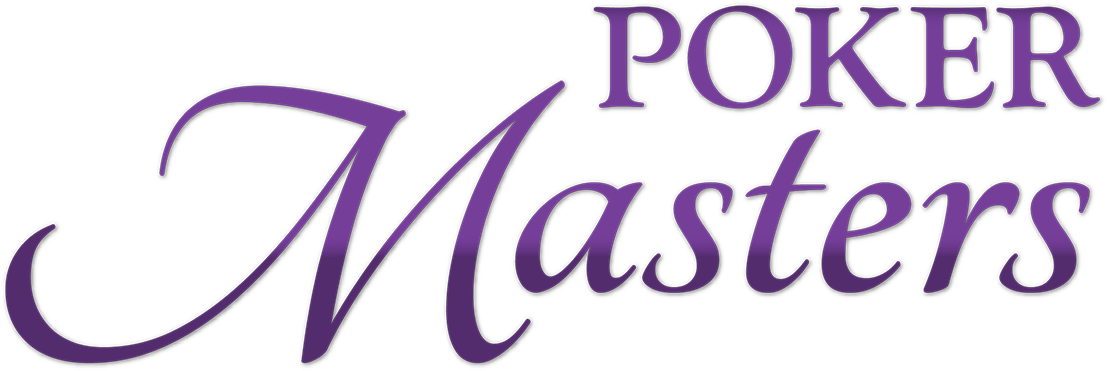
- Venue: PokerGO Studio at ARIA Resort & Casino
- Location: Las Vegas, Nevada
- Dates: September 14-26, 2023

Champion
- (United Kingdom) Stephen Chidwick (Purple Jacket winner); (United States) Jonathan Jaffe (Main Event winner)

The 2023 Poker Masters is the eighth season of the Poker Masters. It will take place from September 14-26, 2023, from the PokerGO Studio at ARIA Resort & Casino in Las Vegas, Nevada. There are 10 events on the schedule and all the events are No-Limit Hold'em. Buy-ins range from $10,000 to the $50,000 Main Event. Final tables will be streamed on PokerGO.

Stephen Chidwick cashed four times including winning Event #8 to earn the Purple Jacket as the series champion.

== Schedule ==
The schedule for the 2023 Poker Masters includes ten No-Limit Hold'em tournaments.

2023 Poker Masters
#	Event	Entrants	Prize Pool (US$)	Winner	Winning Hand	Prize (US$)	Runner-up	Losing hand	Results
1	$10,000 No-Limit Hold'em	114	$1,140,000	(Lithuania) Vladas Tamasauskas	9♥ 9♣	$239,400	(United States) Aram Zobian	Q♠ 2♥	Results
2	$10,000 No-Limit Hold'em	97	$970,000	(United States) Darren Elias	A♥ Q♥	$223,100	(United States) Eric Baldwin	J♠ 8♠	Results
3	$10,000 No-Limit Hold'em	87	$870,000	(Lithuania) Vladas Tamasauskas	Q♦ 3♠	$208,800	(China) Ren Lin	J♥ 9♥	Results
4	$10,000 No-Limit Hold'em	91	$910,000	(United States) Chino Reem	K♥ J♥	$218,400	(United States) Jonathan Little	Q♣ 9♥	Results
5	$10,000 No-Limit Hold'em	85	$850,000	(United States) Andrew Lichtenberger	A♥ 6♠	$204,000	(United States) Brian Kim	A♠ Q♠	Results
6	$10,000 No-Limit Hold'em	95	$950,000	(Turkey) Orpen Kisacikoglu	10♦ 6♥	$218,500	(United Kingdom) Jack Hardcastle	Q♣ J♥	Results
7	$25,000 No-Limit Hold'em	44	$1,100,000	(United States) Nick Schulman	A♦ J♥	$374,000	(United States) Nick Petrangelo	A♥ 4♣	Results
8	$25,000 No-Limit Hold'em	50	$1,250,000	(United Kingdom) Stephen Chidwick	6♠ 2♠	$400,000	(United States) Sam Soverel	Q♣ J♥	Results
9	$25,000 No-Limit Hold'em	37	$925,000	(United States) Justin Bonomo	A♣ Q♠	$333,000	(Austria) Daniel Rezaei	Q♦ 2♣	Results
10	$50,000 No-Limit Hold'em	42	$2,100,000	(United States) Jonathan Jaffe	A♦ 3♥	$756,000	(United Kingdom) Stephen Chidwick	A♠ 9♦	Results

== Purple Jacket standings ==
The 2023 Poker Masters will award the Purple Jacket and a $50,000 championship bonus to the player that accumulates the most PokerGO Tour points during the series. Stephen Chidwick won Event #8 and made three additional final tables, including finishing runner-up in the $50,000 No-Limit Hold'em finale to earn the most PGT points and be awarded the $50,000 championship bonus and 2023 Poker Masters Purple Jacket.

Poker Masters Purple Jacket Standings
Rank	Name	Points	Earnings
1	(United Kingdom) Stephen Chidwick	688	$1,109,000
2	(Lithuania) Vladas Tamasauskas	506	$506,400
3	(United States) Chino Reem	487	$602,650
4	(United States) Alex Foxen	460	$663,500
5	(United States) Jonathan Jaffe	454	$756,000

== Results ==
=== Event #1: $10,000 No-Limit Hold'em ===
- 2-Day Event: September 14-15, 2023
- Number of Entrants: 114
- Total Prize Pool: $1,140,000
- Number of Payouts: 17
- Winning Hand: 9♥ 9♣

Final Table
Place	Name	Prize
1st	(Lithuania) Vladas Tamasauskas	$239,400
2nd	(United States) Aram Zobian	$171,000
3rd	(China) Ren Lin	$125,400
4th	(United States) Filipp Khavin	$102,600
5th	(United States) Victoria Livschitz	$79,800
6th	(United States) Samuel Laskowitz	$68,400

=== Event #2: $10,000 No-Limit Hold'em ===
- 2-Day Event: September 15-16, 2023
- Number of Entrants: 97
- Total Prize Pool: $970,000
- Number of Payouts: 14
- Winning Hand: A♥ Q♥

Final Table
Place	Name	Prize
1st	(United States) Darren Elias	$223,100
2nd	(United States) Eric Baldwin	$155,200
3rd	(United States) Bin Weng	$116,400
4th	(United States) Antonio De La Cruz	$97,000
5th	(United States) Erik Seidel	$77,600
6th	(Lithuania) Vladas Tamasauskas	$58,200

=== Event #3: $10,000 No-Limit Hold'em ===
- 2-Day Event: September 16, 18, 2023
- Number of Entrants: 87
- Total Prize Pool: $870,000
- Number of Payouts: 13
- Winning Hand: Q♦ 3♠

Final Table
Place	Name	Prize
1st	(Lithuania) Vladas Tamasauskas	$208,800
2nd	(China) Ren Lin	$147,900
3rd	(Austria) Daniel Rezaei	$104,400
4th	(United States) Alex Foxen	$87,000
5th	(United States) Michael Rocco	$69,600
6th	(United States) Chance Kornuth	$52,200

=== Event #4: $10,000 No-Limit Hold'em ===
- 2-Day Event: September 18-19, 2023
- Number of Entrants: 91
- Total Prize Pool: $910,000
- Number of Payouts: 13
- Winning Hand: K♥ J♥

Final Table
Place	Name	Prize
1st	(United States) Chino Reem	$218,400
2nd	(United States) Jonathan Little	$154,700
3rd	(United States) Brock Wilson	$109,200
4th	(United States) Chris Brewer	$91,000
5th	(United States) Justin Saliba	$72,800
6th	(Canada) Daniel Negreanu	$54,600

=== Event #5: $10,000 No-Limit Hold'em ===
- 2-Day Event: September 19-20, 2023
- Number of Entrants: 85
- Total Prize Pool: $850,000
- Number of Payouts: 13
- Winning Hand: A♥ 6♠

Final Table
Place	Name	Prize
1st	(United States) Andrew Lichtenberger	$204,000
2nd	(United States) Brian Kim	$144,500
3rd	(United States) Daniel Lazrus	$102,000
4th	(Germany) Niko Koop	$85,000
5th	(United States) Brock Wilson	$68,000
6th	(Germany) Koray Aldemir	$41,000

=== Event #6: $10,000 No-Limit Hold'em ===
- 2-Day Event: September 20-21, 2023
- Number of Entrants: 95
- Total Prize Pool: $950,000
- Number of Payouts: 14
- Winning Hand: 10♦ 6♥

Final Table
Place	Name	Prize
1st	(Turkey) Orpen Kisacikoglu	$218,500
2nd	(United Kingdom) Jack Hardcastle	$152,000
3rd	(United States) Justin Bonomo	$114,000
4th	(United States) Chino Reem	$95,000
5th	(United States) Samuel Laskowitz	$76,000
6th	(United Kingdom) Stephen Chidwick	$57,000

=== Event #7: $25,000 No-Limit Hold'em ===
- 2-Day Event: September 21-22, 2023
- Number of Entrants: 44
- Total Prize Pool: $1,100,000
- Number of Payouts: 7
- Winning Hand: A♦ J♥

Final Table
Place	Name	Prize
1st	(United States) Nick Schulman	$374,000
2nd	(United States) Nick Petrangelo	$242,000
3rd	(United States) Brian Rast	$165,000
4th	(United States) Chris Brewer	$121,000
5th	(United States) Victoria Livschitz	$88,000
6th	(United States) Justin Saliba	$66,000

=== Event #8: $25,000 No-Limit Hold'em ===
- 2-Day Event: September 22-23, 2023
- Number of Entrants: 50
- Total Prize Pool: $1,250,000
- Number of Payouts: 8
- Winning Hand: 6♠ 2♠

Final Table
Place	Name	Prize
1st	(United Kingdom) Stephen Chidwick	$400,000
2nd	(United States) Sam Soverel	$262,500
3rd	(United States) Alex Foxen	$175,000
4th	(United States) Chris Brewer	$125,000
5th	(United States) Darren Elias	$100,000
6th	(United States) Chino Reem	$75,000

=== Event #9: $25,000 No-Limit Hold'em ===
- 2-Day Event: September 23, 25, 2023
- Number of Entrants: 37
- Total Prize Pool: $925,000
- Number of Payouts: 6
- Winning Hand: A♣ Q♠

Final Table
Place	Name	Prize
1st	(United States) Justin Bonomo	$333,000
2nd	(Austria) Daniel Rezaei	$222,000
3rd	(United Kingdom) Stephen Chidwick	$148,000
4th	(United States) Andrew Lichtenberger	$101,750
5th	(Turkey) Orpen Kisacikoglu	$74,000
6th	(United States) Chino Reem	$46,250

=== Event #10: $50,000 No-Limit Hold'em ===
- 2-Day Event: September 25-26, 2023
- Number of Entrants: 42
- Total Prize Pool: $2,100,000
- Number of Payouts: 6
- Winning Hand: A♦ 3♥

Final Table
Place	Name	Prize
1st	(United States) Jonathan Jaffe	$756,000
2nd	(United Kingdom) Stephen Chidwick	$504,000
3rd	(United States) Alex Foxen	$336,000
4th	(United States) Brian Kim	$231,000
5th	(United States) Chino Reem	$168,000
6th	(United States) Nick Petrangelo	$105,000
