= 2022 Poker Masters =

Series of poker tournaments

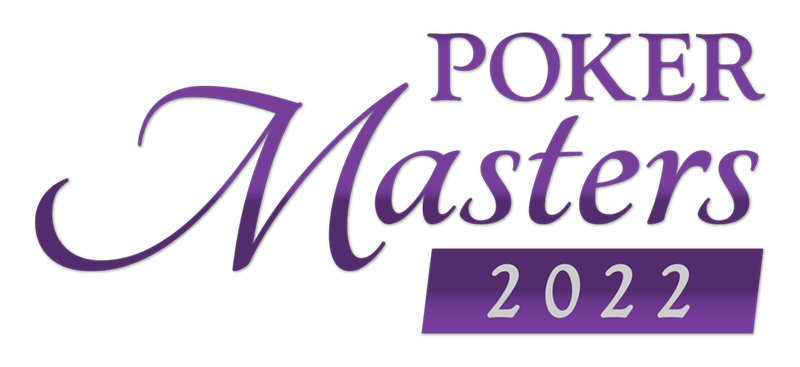
- Venue: PokerGO Studio at ARIA Resort & Casino
- Location: Las Vegas, Nevada
- Dates: September 21-October 3, 2022

Champion
- (United States) Sean Winter (Purple Jacket winner); (United States) Jason Koon (Main Event winner)

The 2022 Poker Masters was the seventh season of the Poker Masters. It took place from September 21 to October 3, 2022, from the PokerGO Studio at ARIA Resort & Casino in Las Vegas, Nevada. There were 10 events on the schedule including nine No-Limit Hold'em, two Pot-Limit Omaha, and one 8-Game event. Buy-ins ranged from $10,000 to the $50,000 Main Event. Final tables were streamed on PokerGO.

Sean Winter cashed twice including winning Event #9 to earn the Purple Jacket as the series champion.

== Schedule ==
The schedule for the 2022 Poker Masters included seven No-Limit Hold'em tournaments, two Pot-Limit Omaha tournaments, and an 8-Game event. 8-Game is a rotation of H.O.R.S.E., No-Limit Hold'em, Pot-Limit Omaha, and 2-7 Triple Draw.

2022 Poker Masters
#	Event	Entrants	Prize Pool (US$)	Winner	Winning Hand	Prize (US$)	Runner-up	Losing hand	Results
1	$10,000 No-Limit Hold'em	85	$850,000	(United States) Jeremy Ausmus	7♣ 7♠	$204,000	(United States) Nick Schulman	A♥ 3♦	Results
2	$10,000 No-Limit Hold'em	76	$760,000	(United States) Ethan Yau	8♠ 8♥	$197,600	(United States) Alex Foxen	A♣ K♠	Results
3	$10,000 Pot-Limit Omaha	81	$810,000	(Netherlands) Ronald Keijzer	A♠ 10♣ 6♠ 6♣	$202,500	(United States) Ben Lamb	Q♠ 8♥ 6♥ 4♦	Results
4	$10,000 No-Limit Hold'em	74	$740,000	(United States) Adam Hendrix	A♣ 9♣	$192,400	(United States) Nate Silver	7♥ 4♥	Results
5	$10,000 8-Game	62	$620,000	(United States) Nick Guagenti	A♥ A♣ Q♥ 2♥	$186,000	(United States) Cary Katz	J♣ J♦ 10♥ 8♣	Results
6	$10,000 No-Limit Hold'em	97	$970,000	(United States) Martin Zamani	Q♥ 9♥	$223,100	(United States) Jared Jaffee	A♦ J♥	Results
7	$25,000 No-Limit Hold'em	69	$1,725,000	(United States) Andrew Lichtenberger	9♥ 4♠	$465,750	(United States) Sean Winter	8♥ 8♣	Results
8	$25,000 Pot-Limit Omaha	40	$1,000,000	(United Kingdom) Tony Bloom	10♣ 9♣ 8♦ 6♦	$360,000	(Canada) Alex Livingston	A♠ A♣ Q♦ 9♥	Results
9	$25,000 No-Limit Hold'em	54	$1,350,000	(United States) Sean Winter	A♦ 7♦	$432,000	(United States) Nick Schulman	K♠ 4♠	Results
10	$50,000 No-Limit Hold'em	37	$1,850,000	(United States) Jason Koon	K♥ 6♥	$666,000	(Spain) Adrian Mateos	A♠ 2♠	Results

== Purple Jacket standings ==
The 2022 Poker Masters awarded the Purple Jacket and a $50,000 championship bonus to the player that accumulated the most PokerGO Tour points during the series.

Poker Masters Purple Jacket Standings
Rank	Name	Points	Earnings
1	(United States) Sean Winter	466	$777,000
2	(United States) Jason Koon	449	$747,000
3	(United States) Nick Schulman	361	$473,800
4	(United States) Erik Seidel	309	$418,900
5	(Canada) Alex Livingston	291	$386,800

== Results ==
=== Event #1: $10,000 No-Limit Hold'em ===
- 2-Day Event: September 21–22, 2022
- Number of Entrants: 85
- Total Prize Pool: $850,000
- Number of Payouts: 13
- Winning Hand: 7♣ 7♠

Final Table
Place	Name	Prize
1st	(United States) Jeremy Ausmus	$204,000
2nd	(United States) Nick Schulman	$144,500
3rd	(United States) Erik Seidel	$102,000
4th	(United States) Anthony Hu	$85,000
5th	(China) Jacky Wang	$68,000
6th	(United States) Cole Ferraro	$51,000
7th	(United States) Cary Katz	$42,500

=== Event #2: $10,000 No-Limit Hold'em ===
- 2-Day Event: September 22–23, 2022
- Number of Entrants: 76
- Total Prize Pool: $760,000
- Number of Payouts: 11
- Winning Hand: 8♠ 8♥

Final Table
Place	Name	Prize
1st	(United States) Ethan Yau	$197,600
2nd	(United States) Alex Foxen	$144,400
3rd	(United States) Stephen Song	$98,800
4th	(United States) Michael Brinkenhoff	$76,000
5th	(United States) Dylan DeStefano	$60,800
6th	(Japan) Masashi Oya	$45,600

=== Event #3: $10,000 Pot-Limit Omaha ===
- 2-Day Event: September 23–24, 2022
- Number of Entrants: 81
- Total Prize Pool: $810,000
- Number of Payouts: 12
- Winning Hand: A♠ 10♣ 6♠ 6♣

Final Table
Place	Name	Prize
1st	(Netherlands) Roland Keijzer	$202,500
2nd	(United States) Ben Lamb	$145,800
3rd	(Canada) Alex Livingston	$97,200
4th	(United States) Damjan Radanov	$81,000
5th	(United States) Allan Le	$64,800
6th	(United States) Dan Shak	$48,600

=== Event #4: $10,000 No-Limit Hold'em ===
- 2-Day Event: September 24–26, 2022
- Number of Entrants: 74
- Total Prize Pool: $740,000
- Number of Payouts: 11
- Winning Hand: A♣ 9♣

Final Table
Place	Name	Prize
1st	(United States) Adam Hendrix	$192,400
2nd	(United States) Nate Silver	$140,600
3rd	(Canada) Xuan Liu	$96,200
4th	(United States) Victoria Livschitz	$74,000
5th	(United States) Ed Sebesta	$59,200
6th	(United States) Erik Seidel	$44,400

=== Event #5: $10,000 8-Game ===
- 2-Day Event: September 26–27, 2022
- Number of Entrants: 62
- Total Prize Pool: $620,000
- Number of Payouts: 9
- Winning Hand: A♥ A♣ Q♥ 2♥

Final Table
Place	Name	Prize
1st	(United States) Nick Guagenti	$186,000
2nd	(United States) Cary Katz	$124,000
3rd	(United States) Benjamin Diebold	$86,800
4th	(United States) Steve Zolotow	$62,000
5th	(Canada) Alex Livingston	$49,600
6th	(China) Jacky Wang	$37,200
7th	(United States) Brian Rast	$31,000

=== Event #6: $10,000 No-Limit Hold'em ===
- 2-Day Event: September 27–28, 2022
- Number of Entrants: 97
- Total Prize Pool: $970,000
- Number of Payouts: 14
- Winning Hand: Q♥ 9♥

Final Table
Place	Name	Prize
1st	(United States) Martin Zamani	$223,100
2nd	(United States) Jared Jaffee	$155,200
3rd	(United States) Justin Saliba	$116,400
4th	(United States) Matthew Wantman	$97,000
5th	(United States) Anthony Hu	$77,600
6th	(Japan) Masashi Oya	$58,200

=== Event #7: $25,000 No-Limit Hold'em ===
- 2-Day Event: September 28–29, 2022
- Number of Entrants: 69
- Total Prize Pool: $1,725,000
- Number of Payouts: 10
- Winning Hand: 9♥ 4♠

Final Table
Place	Name	Prize
1st	(United States) Andrew Lichtenberger	$465,750
2nd	(United States) Sean Winter	$345,000
3rd	(Japan) Kazuhiko Yotsushika	$224,250
4th	(United States) Cary Katz	$172,500
5th	(United States) Chance Kornuth	$138,000
6th	(United Kingdom) Billy Wragg	$103,500

=== Event #8: $25,000 Pot-Limit Omaha ===
- 2-Day Event: September 29–30, 2022
- Number of Entrants: 40
- Total Prize Pool: $1,000,000
- Number of Payouts: 6
- Winning Hand: 10♣ 9♣ 8♦ 6♦

Final Table
Place	Name	Prize
1st	(United Kingdom) Tony Bloom	$360,000
2nd	(Canada) Alex Livingston	$240,000
3rd	(United States) John Riordan	$160,000
4th	(United States) Isaac Kempton	$110,000
5th	(United States) Matthew Wantman	$80,000
6th	(United States) Sam Soverel	$50,000

=== Event #9: $25,000 No-Limit Hold'em ===
- 2-Day Event: September 30-October 1, 2022
- Number of Entrants: 54
- Total Prize Pool: $1,350,000
- Number of Payouts: 8
- Winning Hand: A♦ 7♦

Final Table
Place	Name	Prize
1st	(United States) Sean Winter	$432,000
2nd	(United States) Nick Schulman	$283,500
3rd	(United States) Justin Bonomo	$189,000
4th	(United States) Seth Davies	$135,000
5th	(United States) Brian Rast	$108,000
6th	(United States) Jason Koon	$81,000

=== Event #10: $50,000 No-Limit Hold'em ===
- 2-Day Event: October 1–3, 2022
- Number of Entrants: 37
- Total Prize Pool: $1,850,000
- Number of Payouts: 6
- Winning Hand: K♥ 6♥

Final Table
Place	Name	Prize
1st	(United States) Jason Koon	$666,000
2nd	(Spain) Adrian Mateos	$444,000
3rd	(United States) Scott Seiver	$296,000
4th	(United States) Erik Seidel	$203,500
5th	(United States) Seth Davies	$148,000
6th	(Belarus) Mikita Badziakouski	$92,500
