= 2020 Poker Masters Online PLO Series =

Series of poker tournaments

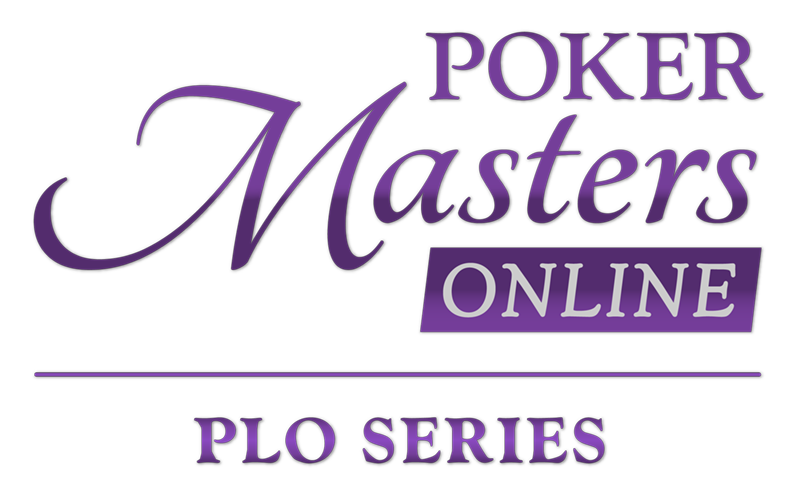
- Location: partypoker (online)
- Dates: June 21-29, 2020

Champion
- (Finland) Eelis Pärssinen (Purple Jacket winner); (United States) Isaac Haxton (Main Event winner)

The 2020 Poker Masters Online PLO Series was the fifth season of the Poker Masters. Following the COVID-19 pandemic, the Poker Masters moved online to partypoker with the 2020 Poker Masters Online in April before the addition of a PLO Series from June 21-20, 2020. The event was sponsored by Poker Central and partypoker, and some of the final tables were streamed on PokerGO, PokerGO's Facebook page, and partypoker's Twitch channel. There were 16 events on the schedule, and they were exclusively Pot-Limit Omaha. Buy-ins ranged from $5,000 to the $50,000 Main Event.

The Main Event was won by American Isaac Haxton, and the Poker Masters Purple Jacket was awarded to Finland's Eelis Pärssinen.

== Schedule ==
The schedule for the 2020 Poker Masters Online PLO Series was a Pot-Limit Omaha exclusive series of 16 events. All tournaments carried a prize pool guarantee of between $250,000 and $1,500,000. Each event last two days, and the final tables were streamed on PokerGO, PokerGO's Facebook page, and partypoker's Twitch channel.

2020 Poker Masters Online PLO Series
#	Event	Entrants	Prize Pool (US$)	Winner	Prize (US$)	Runner-up	Results
1	$10,000 Pot-Limit Omaha	72	$720,000	(Italy) Marcello Marigliano	$249,054	(England) Gavin Cochrane	Results
2	$5,000 Pot-Limit Omaha	81	$405,000	(Hungary) Andras Nemeth	$126,686	(Sweden) Viktor Blom	Results
3	$10,000 Pot-Limit Omaha	53	$530,000	(Finland) Jens Kyllönen	$212,000	(United States) Jonathan Depa	Results
4	$5,000 Pot-Limit Omaha	63	$315,000	(Sweden) Bengt Sonnert	$108,961	(Canada) Andrew Pantling	Results
5	$25,000 Pot-Limit Omaha	44	$1,100,000	(Finland) Eelis Pärssinen	$440,000	(England) Gavin Cochrane	Results
6	$10,000 Pot-Limit Omaha	49	$500,000	(Denmark) Jesper Hougaard	$183,621	(Portugal) Pedro Zagalo	Results
7	$10,000 Pot-Limit Omha	50	$500,000	(Finland) Jens Kyllönen	$200,000	(Finland) Eelis Pärssinen	Results
8	$5,000 Pot-Limit Omaha	52	$260,000	(Sweden) Bengt Sonnert	$104,000	(Finland) Sampo Ryynanen	Results
9	$25,000 Pot-Limit Omaha	43	$1,075,000	(Hungary) Andras Nemeth	$430,000	(England) Gavin Cochrane	Results
10	$10,000 Pot-Limit Omaha	52	$520,000	(Finland) Sami Kelopuro	$208,000	(United States) Isaac Haxton	Results
11	$10,000 Pot-Limit Omaha	49	$500,000	(Finland) Aku Joentausta	$200,000	(Norway) Espen Myrmo	Results
12	$5,000 Pot-Limit Omaha	46	$250,000	(Hungary) Andras Nemeth	$100,000	(Canada) Andrew Pantling	Results
13	$10,000 Pot-Limit Omaha	47	$500,000	(Finland) Jens Kyllönen	$200,000	(Canada) Matthew Wood	Results
14	$5,000 Pot-Limit Omaha	48	$250,000	(United States) Chance Kornuth	$100,000	(Finland) Eelis Pärssinen	Results
15	$50,000 Pot-Limit Omaha Main Event	29	$1,500,000	(United States) Isaac Haxton	$675,000	(Lithuania) Grazvydas Kontautas	Results
16	$5,000 Pot-Limit Omaha Mini Main Event	118	$590,000	(Denmark) Alexander Petersen	$148,624	(Brazil) Dante Fernandes	Results

== Purple Jacket standings ==
The 2020 Poker Masters Online PLO Series awarded the Purple Jacket to the player that accumulated the most points during the series. Finland's Eelis Pärssinen won one event and cashed six times on his way to accumulating $735,359 in winnings. Pärssinen accumulated 625 points and was awarded the Purple Jacket.

Poker Masters Purple Jacket Standings
Rank	Name	Earnings	Points
1	(Finland) Eelis Pärssinen	$735,359	625
2	(Hungary) Andras Nemeth	$674,186	624
3	(Finland) Jens Kyllönen	$612,000	612
4	(England) Gavin Cochrane	$754,094	549
5	(Finland) Aku Joentausta	$507,643	452
6	(Sweden) Bengt Sonnert	$259,761	366
7	(Finland) Sami Kelopuro	$320,700	321
8	(Canada) Andrew Pantling	$277,861	288
9	(Italy) Marcello Marigliano	$269,529	280
10	(Sweden) Viktor Blom	$281,225	273

== Results ==
=== Event #1: $10,000 Pot-Limit Omaha ===
- 2-Day Event: June 21-22, 2020
- Number of Entrants: 72
- Total Prize Pool: $720,000
- Number of Payouts: 9

Event #1 Results
Place	Name	Prize
1st	(Italy) Marcello Marigliano	$249,054
2nd	(England) Gavin Cochrane	$162,000
3rd	(Hungary) Norbert Szecsi	$86,400
4th	(Lebanon) Mark Demirjian	$64,800
5th	(Denmark) Jesper Hougaard	$46,800
6th	(Denmark) Lasse Nielsen	$32,400
7th	(Sweden) Niklas Astedt	$26,182
8th	(Finland) Niko Soininen	$26,182
9th	(Norway) Andreas Torbergsen	$26,182

=== Event #2: $5,000 Pot-Limit Omaha ===
- 2-Day Event: June 21-22, 2020
- Number of Entrants: 81
- Total Prize Pool: $405,000
- Number of Payouts: 12

Event #2 Results
Place	Name	Prize
1st	(Hungary) Andras Nemeth	$126,686
2nd	(Sweden) Viktor Blom	$78,975
3rd	(Sweden) Alexander Norden	$48,600
4th	(Finland) Aku Joentausta	$35,438
5th	(United States) Jake Schindler	$25,313
6th	(England) Gavin Cochrane	$17,213
7th	(United States) Isaac Haxton	$13,163
8th	(Finland) Niko Soininen	$13,163
9th	(Hungary) Laszlo Bujtas	$13,163
10th	(Republic of Ireland) Mark Davis	$11,096
11th	(Lebanon) Mark Demirjian	$11,096
12th	(Canada) Matthew Wood	$11,096

=== Event #3: $10,000 Pot-Limit Omaha ===
- 2-Day Event: June 22-23, 2020
- Number of Entrants: 53
- Total Prize Pool: $530,000
- Number of Payouts: 6

Event #3 Results
Place	Name	Prize
1st	(Finland) Jens Kyllönen	$212,000
2nd	(United States) Jonathan Depa	$135,651
3rd	(Ukraine) Andriy Lyubovetskiy	$68,900
4th	(Finland) Sami Kelopuro	$47,700
5th	(Finland) Eelis Pärssinen	$37,100
6th	(Bulgaria) Veselin Karakitukov	$28,649

=== Event #4: $5,000 Pot-Limit Omaha ===
- 2-Day Event: June 22-23, 2020
- Number of Entrants: 63
- Total Prize Pool: $315,000
- Number of Payouts: 9

Event #4 Results
Place	Name	Prize
1st	(Sweden) Bengt Sonnert	$108,961
2nd	(Canada) Andrew Pantling	$70,875
3rd	(United States) Jonathan Depa	$37,800
4th	(Norway) Andreas Torbergsen	$28,350
5th	(Italy) Marcello Marigliano	$20,475
6th	(Netherlands) Noah Boeken	$14,175
7th	(Finland) Aku Joentausta	$11,455
8th	(Hungary) Ferenc Deak	$11,455
9th	(Portugal) Pedro Zagalo	$11,455

=== Event #5: $25,000 Pot-Limit Omaha ===
- 2-Day Event: June 23-24, 2020
- Number of Entrants: 44
- Total Prize Pool: $1,100,000
- Number of Payouts: 6

Event #5 Results
Place	Name	Prize
1st	(Finland) Eelis Pärssinen	$440,000
2nd	(England) Gavin Cochrane	$281,540
3rd	(Canada) Andrew Pantling	$143,000
4th	(Finland) Aku Joentausta	$99,000
5th	(United States) Jake Schindler	$77,000
6th	James Greenwood	$59,460

=== Event #6: $10,000 Pot-Limit Omaha ===
- 2-Day Event: June 23-24, 2020
- Number of Entrants: 49
- Total Prize Pool: $500,000
- Number of Payouts: 6

Event #6 Results
Place	Name	Prize
1st	(Denmark) Jesper Hougaard	$183,621
2nd	(Portugal) Pedro Zagalo	$144,352
3rd	(United States) Jonathan Depa	$65,000
4th	(Finland) Joni Jouhkimainen	$45,000
5th	(Ukraine) Andriy Lyubovetskiy	$35,000
6th	Maxime Lemay	$27,028

=== Event #7: $10,000 Pot-Limit Omaha ===
- 2-Day Event: June 24-25, 2020
- Number of Entrants: 50
- Total Prize Pool: $500,000
- Number of Payouts: 6

Event #7 Results
Place	Name	Prize
1st	(Finland) Jens Kyllönen	$200,000
2nd	(Finland) Eelis Pärssinen	$127,973
3rd	(Finland) Aku Joentausta	$65,000
4th	(Wales) Roberto Romanello	$45,000
5th	(Hungary) Laszlo Bujtas	$35,000
6th	(Norway) Andreas Torbergsen	$27,028

=== Event #8: $5,000 Pot-Limit Omaha ===
- 2-Day Event: June 24-25, 2020
- Number of Entrants: 52
- Total Prize Pool: $260,000
- Number of Payouts: 6

Event #8 Results
Place	Name	Prize
1st	(Sweden) Bengt Sonnert	$104,000
2nd	(Finland) Sampo Ryynanen	$66,546
3rd	(Finland) Eelis Pärssinen	$33,800
4th	(Finland) Joni Jouhkimainen	$23,400
5th	(England) Gavin Cochrane	$18,200
6th	(Hungary) Ferenc Deak	$14,054

=== Event #9: $25,000 Pot-Limit Omaha ===
- 2-Day Event: June 25-26, 2020
- Number of Entrants: 43
- Total Prize Pool: $1,075,000
- Number of Payouts: 6

Event #9 Results
Place	Name	Prize
1st	(Hungary) Andras Nemeth	$430,000
2nd	(England) Gavin Cochrane	$275,141
3rd	(Sweden) Viktor Blom	$139,750
4th	(Finland) Aku Joentausta	$96,750
5th	(Portugal) Joao Vieira	$75,250
6th	(United States) George Wolff	$58,109

=== Event #10: $10,000 Pot-Limit Omaha ===
- 2-Day Event: June 25-26, 2020
- Number of Entrants: 52
- Total Prize Pool: $520,000
- Number of Payouts: 6

Event #10 Results
Place	Name	Prize
1st	(Finland) Sami Kelopuro	$208,000
2nd	(United States) Isaac Haxton	$133,091
3rd	(Portugal) Joao Vieira	$67,600
4th	(Sweden) Bengt Sonnert	$46,800
5th	(Republic of Ireland) Mark Davis	$36,400
6th	(Hungary) Laszlo Bujtas	$28,109

=== Event #11: $10,000 Pot-Limit Omaha ===
- 2-Day Event: June 26-27, 2020
- Number of Entrants: 49
- Total Prize Pool: $500,000
- Number of Payouts: 6

Event #11 Results
Place	Name	Prize
1st	(Finland) Aku Joentausta	$200,000
2nd	(Norway) Espen Myrmo	$127,973
3rd	(Finland) Sami Kelopuro	$65,000
4th	(Sweden) Viktor Blom	$45,000
5th	(Sweden) Henrik Eide	$35,000
6th	(Sweden) Niklas Astedt	$27,028

=== Event #12: $5,000 Pot-Limit Omaha ===
- 2-Day Event: June 26-27, 2020
- Number of Entrants: 46
- Total Prize Pool: $250,000
- Number of Payouts: 6

Event #12 Results
Place	Name	Prize
1st	(Hungary) Andras Nemeth	$100,000
2nd	(Canada) Andrew Pantling	$63,986
3rd	(Finland) Eelis Pärssinen	$32,500
4th	(Canada) Matthew Wood	$22,500
5th	(Sweden) Viktor Blom	$17,500
6th	(Greece) Dimitrios Michailidis	$13,514

=== Event #13: $10,000 Pot-Limit Omaha ===
- 2-Day Event: June 27-28, 2020
- Number of Entrants: 47
- Total Prize Pool: $500,000
- Number of Payouts: 6

Event #13 Results
Place	Name	Prize
1st	(Finland) Jens Kyllönen	$200,000
2nd	(Canada) Matthew Wood	$127,973
3rd	(Norway) Espen Myrmo	$65,000
4th	(England) Stephen Chidwick	$45,000
5th	(Sweden) Niklas Astedt	$35,000
6th	(Scotland) Ludovic Geilich	$27,028

=== Event #14: $5,000 Pot-Limit Omaha ===
- 2-Day Event: June 27-28, 2020
- Number of Entrants: 48
- Total Prize Pool: $250,000
- Number of Payouts: 6

Event #14 Results
Place	Name	Prize
1st	(United States) Chance Kornuth	$100,000
2nd	(Finland) Eelis Pärssinen	$63,986
3rd	(Canada) Matthew Wood	$32,500
4th	(England) Simon Trumper	$22,500
5th	(Hungary) Andras Nemeth	$17,500
6th	(Norway) Espen Myrmo	$13,514

=== Event #15: $50,000 Pot-Limit Omaha Main Event ===
- 2-Day Event: June 28-29, 2020
- Number of Entrants: 29
- Total Prize Pool: $1,500,000
- Number of Payouts: 4

Event #15 Results
Place	Name	Prize
1st	(United States) Isaac Haxton	$675,000
2nd	(Lithuania) Grazvydas Kontautas	$442,104
3rd	(Finland) Aku Joentausta	$225,000
4th	(Canada) Chris Kruk	$157,896

=== Event #16: $5,000 Pot-Limit Omaha Mini Main Event ===
- 2-Day Event: June 28-29, 2020
- Number of Entrants: 118
- Total Prize Pool: $590,000
- Number of Payouts: 18

Event #16 Results
Place	Name	Prize
1st	(Denmark) Alexander Petersen	$148,624
2nd	(Brazil) Dante Fernandes	$100,300
3rd	(Germany) Jens Lakemeier	$70,800
4th	(Norway) Joachim Haraldstad	$50,150
5th	(Finland) Joni Jouhkimainen	$36,865
6th	(Sweden) Alexander Norden	$24,485
