= Jason Koon =

American poker player (born 1985)

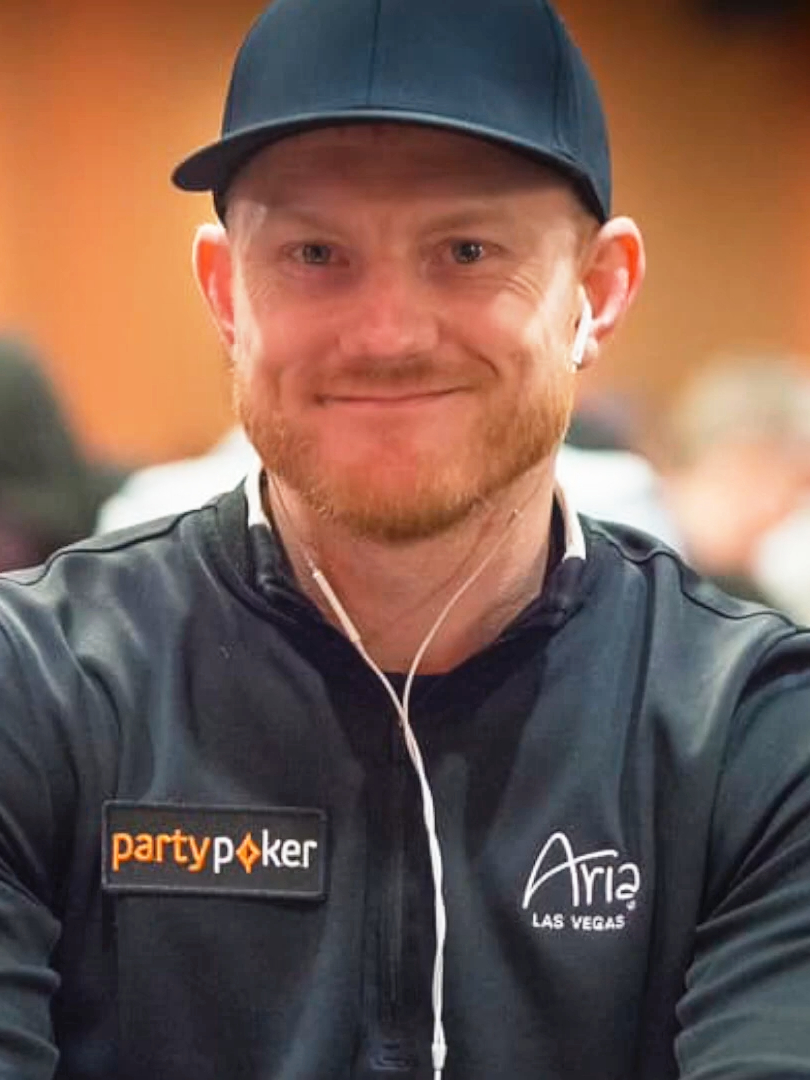
- Jason Koon
- Nicknames: JAKoon1985; NovaSky
- Born: August 14, 1985 (age 41); Weston, West Virginia, U.S.

World Series of Poker
- Bracelets: 2
- Final tables: 18
- Money finishes: 69

Jason Koon (born August 14, 1985) is an American professional poker player from Weston, West Virginia, known for his accomplishments in live and online poker tournaments. He has won two World Series of Poker (WSOP) bracelets, and he holds a record 12 Triton Poker Series titles. He is ranked third on the all-time money list. He was inducted to the Poker Hall of Fame in 2026.

== Early life ==
Koon was born in August 14,1985 and spent his childhood in rural Weston, West Virginia. His father was sent to jail for domestic violence when he was eight, after which they had no more contact. He graduated from Lewis County High School in 2003 and then attended West Virginia Wesleyan College in Buckhannon. There he received his Masters in Business Administration and Finance.

Koon played baseball and football in high school, and he was also an athlete who competed in track and field events at the collegiate level. In his sophomore year, he suffered an injury that resulted in torn hip ligaments, and he started playing poker to stave off boredom while recuperating from his injury. His roommate taught him Texas hold 'em, and Koon realized that he has the aptitude for playing poker, that poker is a game of skills and he could make money from the game. His initial venture into online poker was unsuccessful, but he persevered in learning to play the game and started winning. He managed to pay off his student debts from his poker winnings by the time he graduated.

Koon worked in an insurance company after graduating in 2008, but left his job after a few weeks and moved to Las Vegas to focus on poker.

== Poker career ==
=== 2006–2011: Early achievements ===
Koon began playing poker in 2006 while still in college. He played initially online under the alias JAKoon1985 on PokerStars and NovaSky on Full Tilt Poker. He played low- to medium-stake online tournaments in the early years. In April 2009, he won a tournament in the Spring Championship of Online Poker earning over $300,000 prize money.

In 2011, Koon chopped a Full Tilt Poker "FTOPS" event that had 11,343 runners for $458,550. Koon's online earnings had exceeded $2.4 million by 2011.

Koon started participating in live poker games in 2008. His first foray into live poker failed, but he won his first live cash at the 2008 Deep Stack Extravaganza in Las Vegas. Koon played in his first WSOP in 2009 where he cashed twice. In 2010, Koon finished 4th in the World Poker Tour main event at the Bellagio for $225,000. He won $700,000 in three years from live poker.

In 2011, due to the fallout from the Black Friday case, Koon moved to Vancouver, Canada to continue playing online poker. Later in the year he moved to Cyprus. While in Vancouver, he roomed with Ben Tollerene who helped him play a more mathematical game. This year he also started to play and win medium to higher stakes games.

=== 2012–2016: Live and online success ===
In 2012, Koon played in the high roller event at the Bahamas EPT event earning over $270,000. At the 2012 WSOP Koon finish 2nd in the $3,000 No Limit Hold'em/Pot Limit Omaha - Heads-Up event earning $128,660.

In 2013, Koon finished runner up to David Peters in the $10,000 Bellagio Cup earning $316,000.

In 2015, Koon turned $100 into $110,820 after 18 hours of play finishing third in a low buy in event at the SCOOP on PokerStars. He won $842,084 in total in 2015, which he considered "roughly break-even" due to the stakes involved.

Koon started a series of major successes in 2016. He won $514,080 in the $25,000 NLHE Bellagio High Roller 7 in Las Vegas. He won his first million dollar prize in the Seminole Hard Rock Poker Open, defeating Seth Davies in heads up. He won $2.89 million in 2016.

=== 2017–present: Super high roller wins ===
In 2017, Koon won $1,650,300 in the PokerStars Championship $100,000 Super High Roller event in the Bahamas. Later in the year Koon won a large pot off Doug Polk in the hybrid cash game on Poker After Dark. He won $4.3 million in total in 2017.

Koon's most lucrative tournament win to date was in Triton Poker's 2018 Super High Roller Series Montenegro in Budva. In a short-deck ante-only tournament with a HK$1 million buy-in (US$127,000 at tournament time) and 103 entrants, he won HK$28,102,000 (US$3,579,914), defeating Xuan Tan in heads-up play.

In August 2019, Koon finished 2nd in the Event 3 of London Triton Poker Super High Roller Series (£50,000 No Limit Hold'em - 8 Handed) for £907,000.

On January 13, 2021, Koon made his debut on High Stakes Poker after filling the seat left empty by Jean-Robert Bellande in Episode 5 of Season 8. Koon bought in for $300,000 and the game was $400/$800 No-Limit Hold'em. In June, he finished third at the U.S. Poker Open, earning $336,000. During the 2021 WSOP, Koon won Event #11, the $25,000 Heads-Up No-Limit Hold’em Championship for his first WSOP bracelet.

In October 2022, Koon won Event #10: $50,000 No-Limit Hold'em of the 2022 Poker Masters. Koon topped a 37-entrant field to win $666,000. In December 2022, Koon faced off with Phil Hellmuth in Round 5 of PokerGO's High Stakes Duel 3. Koon defeated Hellmuth and won the $1,600,000 prize while advancing to Round 6. Koon finished third overall on the 2022 PokerGO Tour leaderboard with 2,833 PGT points. Koon was one of the 21-eligible players that were able to participate in the season-ending PGT Championship. Koon finished Day 1 as the overwhelming chip leader before winning the event after defeating Sean Winter heads-up for $500,000.

In January 2023, no challenger stepped up to take on Koon in Round 6 of High Stakes Duel 3, and he was declared the champion. On February 18, 2023, Koon won the 3rd annual World Series of Art Poker in Los Angeles, CA. The unique artist based tournament is put on by Stussy, Casinola, and Wood Kusaka Studio every year coinciding with LA's art fair week. Later that year, on May 22, Koon triumphed against Sam Greenwood, winning the $100,000 Triton Main Event in Cyprus and taking home $2,451,082. In December, he finished second in the $100,000 Ultra High Roller event at the WSOP in Bahamas which earned him $1,817,000.

In May 2025, Koon won $3,393,656, the second-largest prize of his career thus far, at Triton Poker's $150,000 no-limit hold'em event in Montenegro. He followed this with another win in the final event of the series, the $30K PLO Bounty Quattro event, which was his 12th win at Triton Poker. He had more than twice as many wins at Triton than the nearest competitors who each had five. In June 2025, he also won $1,968,927 and his second WSOP bracelet in the $50,000 High Roller event. This took his career winnings to $66 million, third in the all time money list.

In May 2026, Koon won €1,000,000 ($1,173,378) in the 100K European Poker Tour Monte Carlo Sit & Go tournament with a 'winner take all' format. As of June 2026, Koon's total live tournament earnings exceed $77 million. He stands 3rd in the world all-time money list in 2026.

== Tournament Series wins ==
=== World Series of Poker Bracelets ===
Year	Tournament	Prize $ (US)
2021	$25,000 Heads Up No-Limit Hold'em Championship	$243,981
2025	$50,000 No-Limit Hold'em High Roller	$1,968,927

=== Triton Poker Series ===
Festival	Tournament	Prize money
Montenegro 2018	1M HKD Short Deck Ante Only	HKD 28,102,000
Jeju 2019	1M HKD Short Deck Ante-Only	HKD 22,300,000
Jeju 2019	1M HKD NLH Triton Refresh	HKD 7,640,160
Madrid 2022	€150k Short Deck One Bullet	€1,750,000
Vietnam 2023	$50k NLH Turbo	$574,000
Cyprus 2023	$20k NLH 7-Handed	$663,000
Cyprus 2023	$100k NLH Main Event	$2,451,082
London 2023	$60k NLH 7-Handed	$1,570,000
London 2023	$60k SD Main Event Ante-Only	$828,000
Monte-Carlo 2023	$25k PLO Turbo	$365,000
Montenegro 2025	$150k NLH 8-Handed	$3,393,656
Montenegro 2025	$30k PLO Turbo Bounty Quattro	$305,176 + $80,000 bounty

=== Poker Go Tour Titles ===
Year	Tournament	Prize ($US)
2021	Poker Go Cup #6 - $25,000 NLH	$324,000
2021	WSOP #11 - $25,000 Heads-Up Championship	$243,981
2022	Triton Madrid #13 - €150k Short Deck	$1,750,000
2022	Poker Masters #10 - $50,000 NLH	$666,000
2022	PGT Championship - $500,000 Freeroll	$500,000
2025	WSOP #32 $50,000 No-Limit Hold'em High Roller	$1,968,927

== Personal life ==
Koon became engaged to Bianca Armstrong after three years of dating. The couple first met while on the track and field team at West Virginia Wesleyan College. They married on October 26, 2019, at the Redwood Cathedral at Ventana Big Sur, California. They welcomed their first child in September 2021. Their second son was born in June 2023, and the third in September 2026.

Koon was inducted into the Poker Hall of Fame in 2026, the first year he became eligible.

== Sponsorships ==
In October 2017, Jason Koon was announced as a member of partypoker’s team pro. In August 2021, Koon left partypoker.

He also works as a coach on RunItOnce.

In October 2021 at the 2021 World Series of Poker, Koon was announced as a GGPoker Global Ambassador. He left GGPoker in February 2024, later that year he became a PokerStars ambassador. He is also ambassador for the Triton Poker Super High Roller Series since 2019.
