= Poker Central =

Website with news, information, and events relating to poker

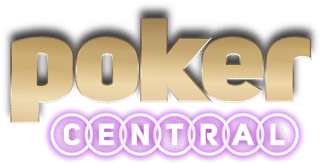
- Website type: News, Live streaming, Video hosting
- Founder: Cary Katz
- Website: www.pokercentral.com
- Commercial: Yes
- Launched: October 1, 2015; 10 years ago
- Current status: Active

Poker Central is a website and service which focuses on poker news, events, live streaming and hosting poker content. It operates PokerGO an online paid subscription channel and streaming service which features multiple poker shows, cash games and tournaments.

== History ==
Poker Central was founded by poker player and entrepreneur, Cary Katz. He founded and is part owner of Conservative Review TV (CRTV) which is part owner of Poker Central. Other part owners and investors include Daniel Negreanu, Phil Hellmuth and Antonio Esfandiari. The website and service was launched on October 1, 2015.

In 2018, Katz sued CRTV, which he is part owner, for alleged failures to repay a $20 million loan Katz had given the company earlier. In May of that year, Poker Central opened the PokerGO Studio at the ARIA Resort and Casino. This poker studio is a 10,000 square-foot space built to host live poker events distributed on the poker streaming service, PokerGO. Notable poker tournaments and cash games held at the PokerGO Studio include the Super High Roller Bowl, Poker Masters, U.S. Poker Open, Poker After Dark and more. The PokerGO Studio is open to the public on an event-by-event basis.

In 2020, Poker Central acquire the assets and brand of High Stakes Poker. In the same year, Poker Central extended a partnership with NBC Sports which began in 2017 and was extended until 2022.

== PokerGO ==
The majority of the tournament series hosted by Poker Central are broadcast live from the paid live streaming platform PokerGO, which is distributed by Poker Central. A subscription currently costs around 15 US dollars per month, although a 3-month subscription can also be taken out for around 30 US dollars or an annual subscription for around 100 US dollars. The portal has also secured broadcasting rights to select events such as the World Series of Poker, the World Series of Poker Europe and partypoker Live, as well as the annual Global Poker Awards. PokerGO also owns the broadcasting rights to Poker After Dark and High Stakes Duel.
