= Ben Tollerene =

American poker player (born 1986)

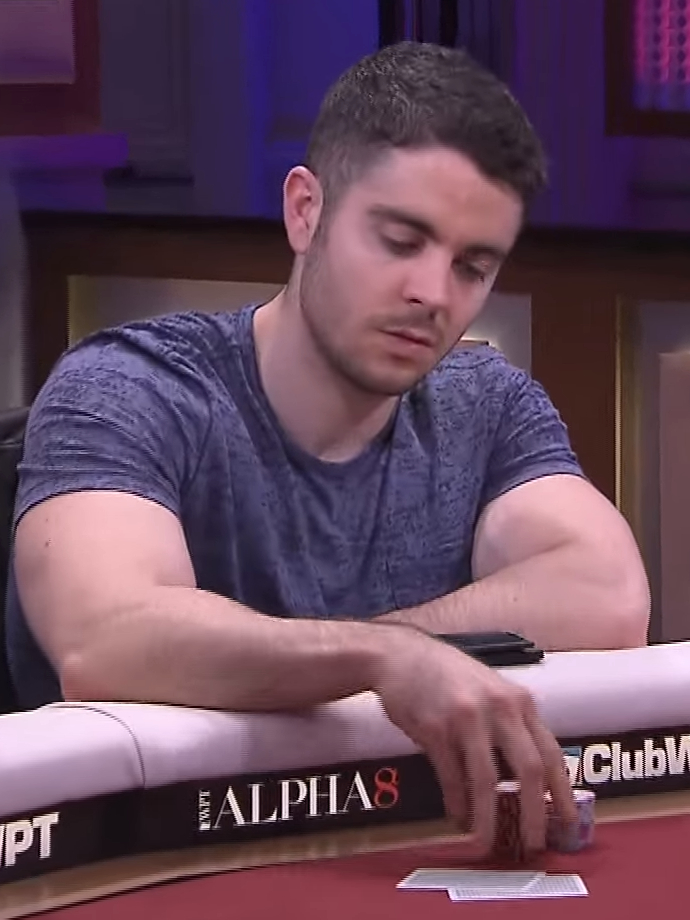
- Ben Tollerene in 2015
- Nicknames: Ben86; Bttech86
- Born: December 20, 1986 (age 39)

World Series of Poker
- Bracelet: None

World Poker Tour
- Title: None
- Final table: None
- Money finishes: 2

European Poker Tour
- Title: None
- Final table: None
- Money finish: 1

Benjamin Tollerene (born December 20, 1986) is an American professional poker player who specializes in Omaha hold 'em.

== Poker career ==
Tollerene specializes in online high-stakes, but also plays live tournaments, winning over $2,600,000 as of 2017. Tollerene said he lost $1.7 million to Viktor Blom in one night before winning it all back in the next 24 hours.

Tollerene earned over $3,800,000 playing on PokerStars under the alias Ben86 and won over $7,400,000 on Full Tilt Poker playing under the alias Bttech86.

As of 2026, Tollerene has cashed for over $37,000,000 in live poker tournaments.

== Triton Titles ==
Festival	Tournament	Prize $
Cyprus 2022	$30k NLH 6-Handed	$807,927
Monte-Carlo 2024	$50k Pot Limit Omaha	$1,070,000
Montenegro 2025	$100K PLO Main Event	$2,390,000
Jeju 2026	$100K NLH Main Event	$3,766,000

== Poker GO Tour Titles ==
Year	Tournament	Prize $
2022	Triton Mediterranean Poker Party #2: $30k NLH	$930,000
2024	Poker Masters #8 - $25,200 No-Limit Hold'em	$510,000
2024	PGT PLO Series II #8 - $25,200 Pot-Limit Omaha Championship	$496,000
