= Kristen Foxen =

Canadian poker player (born 1986)

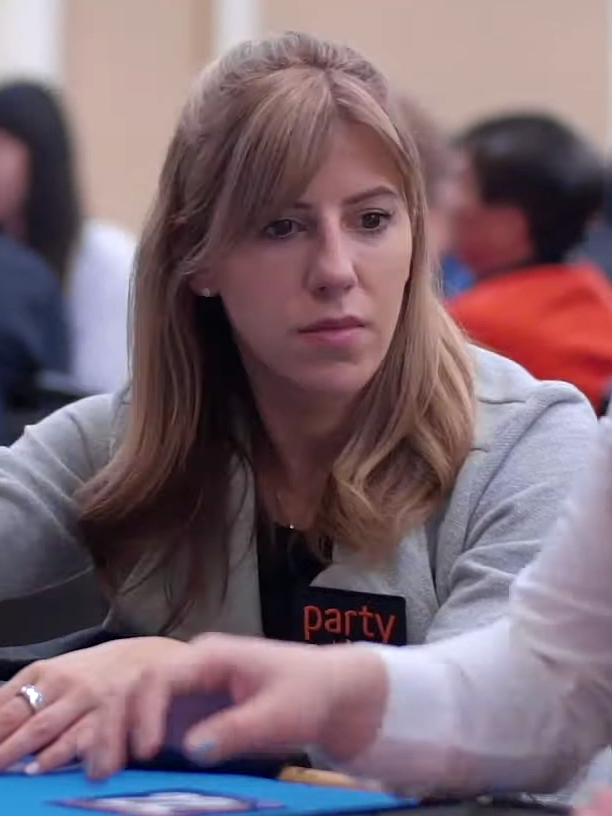
- Foxen in 2020
- Born: December 29, 1986 (age 39); St. Catharines, Ontario, Canada

World Series of Poker
- Bracelets: 6
- Money finishes: 85
- Highest WSOP Main Event finish: 13th, 2024

World Poker Tour
- Title: None
- Final table: 1
- Money finishes: 5

European Poker Tour
- Title: None
- Final tables: 2
- Money finishes: 4

Kristen Foxen (née Bicknell; born December 29, 1986) is a Canadian professional poker player. She is a six-time World Series of Poker (WSOP) bracelet winner, the most by any woman in the event's history, and a five-time Global Poker Index Female Player of the Year.

As of June 2026, her tracked live tournament earnings exceed $18.9 million, placing her first on the women's all-time money list.

In 2017, Foxen was the highest-ranked female poker player in live tournaments, accumulating 2,627.75 GPI points and ranking ahead of Maria Ho.

== Early life ==
Foxen was born on December 29, 1986, in St. Catharines, Ontario.

Foxen grew up drawing inspiration from poker legend Jennifer Harman, admiring her composure and the respect she commanded at the poker table. Watching Poker After Dark in its early days, she was motivated by Harman's strong female presence in high-stakes poker. Seeing a woman compete at that level made Foxen feel that she could achieve the same success in the game.

== Poker career ==
=== Early career ===
Foxen began playing poker during her freshman year of college. In 2006, she started playing online under the aliases "krissyb24" on PokerStars and "krissy24" on Full Tilt Poker.

Foxen achieved Supernova Elite status on PokerStars in 2011, 2012, and 2013, a milestone that required playing approximately 2.5 million hands per year. She primarily focused on online games at the $1/$2 to $2/$4 stakes. Due to the high volume of hands she played, she referred to herself as the "Ultimate Grinder."

=== World Series of Poker (WSOP) ===
In 2013, she won the $1,000 Ladies No Limit Hold'em Championship at the 2013 World Series of Poker, earning $173,922.

In 2016, Foxen won the $1,500 No-Limit hold'em bounty event and earned $290,768.

In 2021, Foxen was one of the more prominent players who protested the WSOP decision to require players to be vaccinated against COVID-19.

In 2020, Foxen won her third WSOP bracelet during the WSOP Online series, earning $356,412 in the $2,500 No-Limit Hold'em 6-Handed event. In 2023, she became the first female player to win a fourth WSOP bracelet by claiming victory in the WSOP Online $888 No-Limit Hold'em Crazy 8's event.

In October 2024, Foxen won Event #19: $1,000 No-Limit Hold'em 6-Max tournament on WSOP Online. Playing under the screen name "Saraswati," Foxen claimed the largest share of the $290,785 prize pool, earning $56,703 and a WSOP gold bracelet. This win marked Foxen's fifth World Series of Poker (WSOP) bracelet, making her the first woman to reach five bracelets.

In June 2026, Foxen extended her own record by winning Event #19: $25,000 No-Limit Hold'em High Roller at the 2026 World Series of Poker, defeating Galen Hall heads-up out of 345 entries for $1,773,083, the largest live cash of her career and her sixth WSOP bracelet.

With six bracelets, Foxen has twice as many WSOP titles as any other woman; Vanessa Selbst, Barbara Enright, and Nani Dollison are tied for second with three each. Foxen's six WSOP bracelets include three won at live events in Las Vegas (2013, 2016, 2026) and three won online (2020, 2023, and 2024).

World Series of Poker bracelets
Year	Event	Prize money
2013	$1,000 Ladies No Limit Hold'em Championship	$173,922
2016	$1,500 Bounty No Limit Hold'em	$290,768
2020 O	$2,500 No Limit Hold'em 6-Handed	$356,411
2023 O	$888 No Limit Hold'Em Crazy 8's	$92,142
2024 O	$1,000 No-Limit Hold'em 6-Max	$56,703
2026	$25,000 High Roller No-Limit Hold'em	$1,773,083

An "O" following a year denotes bracelet(s) won during the World Series of Poker Online

=== PokerGO Tour (PGT) ===
In 2019, Kristen Foxen recorded eight six-figure cashes. Her final major victory of the year came in November at the Poker Masters series, where she earned $408,000 after defeating Chance Kornuth heads-up for first place. Her overall performance that year contributed to her winning her third consecutive GPI Ladies Player of the Year title.

Foxen went on to win the GPI Female Player of the Year award for a fourth time in 2023 and a fifth time in 2025, becoming the only player to win the award more than three times.

With the COVID-19 pandemic halting most live poker tournaments in 2020, Kristen Foxen competed in several online poker series throughout the year. She cashed nine times in the online Super High Roller Bowl series, including a third-place finish in a $25,500 buy-in event, earning $236,000.

In January 2024, Foxen won Event #5: $10,100 No-Limit Hold'em at the PGT Kickoff Series, securing the $165,000 first-place prize after a competitive final table. She eliminated her husband, Alex Foxen, in fifth place and later gained a decisive chip lead after knocking out Samuel Laskowitz in third.

In heads-up play against Daniel Negreanu, Foxen won key hands, including a crucial river call and an overbet that left Negreanu with just six big blinds. She clinched the victory when her jack-six prevailed against Negreanu's king-nine. The win marked her second career PGT title and 12th career tournament victory.

In January 2025, Foxen successfully defended her title by winning Event #5: $10,100 No-Limit Hold'em at the PGT Kickoff Series, earning $197,625 after a heads-up deal with Joao Simao. Throughout the tournament, Foxen maintained a dominant chip lead, briefly relinquishing it during heads-up play.

In the final hand, she called Simao's all-in bluff with two pair to secure the victory. Foxen had also won the same event in the previous year's PGT Kickoff Series, making this a consecutive title defense.

In February 2025, Foxen won PokerGO Cup Event #7: $15,100 No-Limit Hold'em, earning $348,300 and moving into first place on the 2025 PokerGO Tour leaderboard. Entering the final table with the shortest stack, she overcame the deficit and ultimately defeated Patrick Leonard heads-up with a 4-1 chip advantage.

This victory marked her second win of the year on the PokerGO Tour, following her $197,625 win in the $10,100 PokerGO Tour Kickoff Series finale in January. It was also her third cash in seven events during the PokerGO Cup.

PGT trophies
Year	Event	Prize money
2024	PGT Kickoff Event #5: $10,100 No-Limit Hold'em	$165,000
2025	PGT Kickoff Event #5: $10,100 No-Limit Hold'em	$197,625
2025	PokerGO Cup Event #7: $15,100 No-Limit Hold'em	$348,300
2025	U.S. Poker Open #1: $5,100 No-Limit Hold'em	$158,025

=== World Poker Tour (WPT) ===
In December 2017, Foxen won WPT Five Diamond Series Event #13: $5,200 No-Limit Hold'em at the Bellagio. She outlasted a field of 147 players to claim the first-place trophy and a prize of $199,840.

=== Other Notable Tournaments ===
In March 2018, Foxen won the APPT National High Roller in Macau, earning HKD $2,192,000 (approximately USD $279,549). At the final table, she defeated David Peters heads-up to secure the title, topping a field of 117 players who each entered for HKD $80,000.

=== Poker After Dark ===
Foxen (formerly Bicknell) appeared in Poker After Dark's "Femme Fatale" week, playing high-stakes cash games on January 3 and 4, 2018. On the first day, she eliminated J.J. Liu in a queens-versus-aces hand but later lost a significant pot to Tracy Nguyen after Nguyen hit a nut flush.

Foxen also faced a major preflop confrontation, ultimately folding to a five-bet from Nguyen. Despite some setbacks, she finished the session with over $100,000 in winnings, making her one of the top earners of the event.

=== Sponsorships ===
In 2018, Foxen signed with partypoker as a sponsored pro. However, in August 2021, she and partypoker parted ways, with no official reason provided for the departure.

In 2025, Foxen signed with WePoker as an ambassador.

== Personal life ==
Kristen Foxen (née Bicknell) married fellow professional poker player Alex Foxen in April 2022 in the Florida Keys. Shortly after, the couple opted to forgo a honeymoon and instead competed in the WPT Seminole Hard Rock Poker Open in Hollywood, Florida.

Foxen described the wedding as a small, intimate ceremony attended by close friends and family. The timing of their wedding coincided with the poker tournament, making for a seamless transition into their next competition.

In December 2024, Foxen was inducted into the Women in Poker Hall of Fame. In September 2025, she surpassed Vanessa Selbst on the women's all-time live tournament money list to become the highest-earning female tournament player in history.
