= Darren Elias =

American poker player (born 1986)

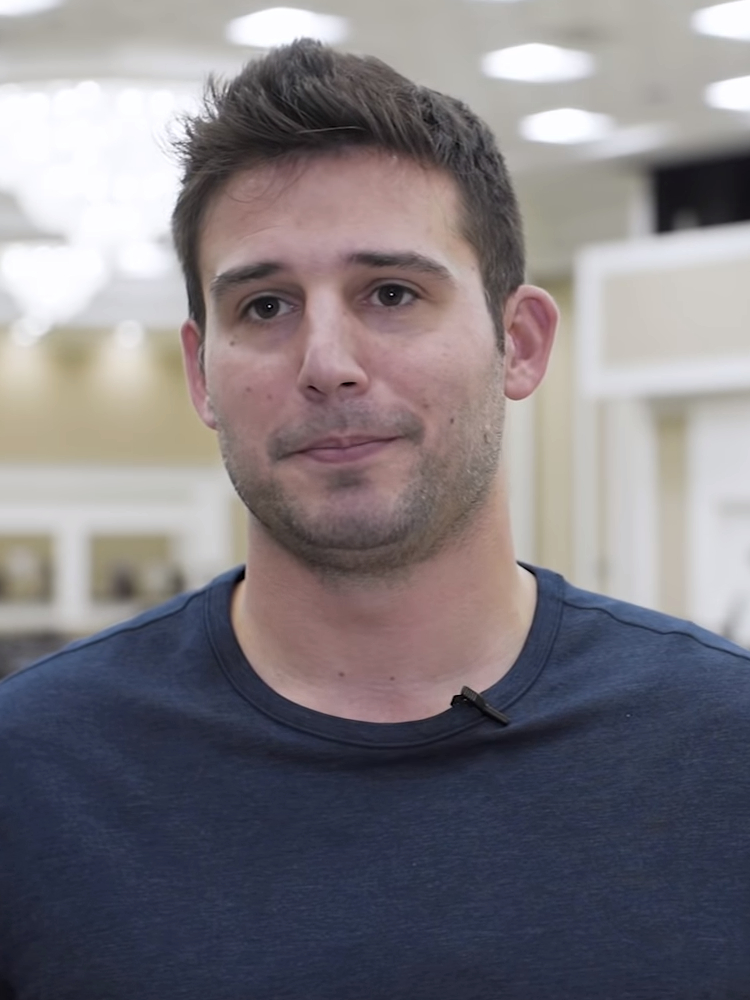
- Elias in 2019
- Nicknames: "The End Boss, Big Brisket"
- Born: November 18, 1986 (age 39)

World Series of Poker
- Bracelet: 1
- Final tables: 13
- Money finishes: 68
- Highest WSOP Main Event finish: 50th, 2020

World Poker Tour
- Titles: 4
- Final tables: 13
- Money finishes: 50

Darren Elias (born November 18, 1986) is an American professional poker player. He holds the record for most World Poker Tour titles, with four.

== Early life and online poker ==
Elias was born in Boston and now lives in Medford, New Jersey. He was an ocean lifeguard in Myrtle Beach, South Carolina before he became a professional poker player. Elias attended the University of Redlands in Redlands, California with the chosen studies of mathematics and physics - later switching to creative writing - where he graduated with a bachelor's degree in 2008.

In addition to his successes in live poker, he has also done well in online poker, winning over $8 million online. He played under the username "darrenelias" on Pokerstars and Full Tilt Poker, where he won two World Championship of Online Poker (WCOOP) titles and an FTOPS title. Elias was the #1 ranked online poker player in the world in 2009.

== Professional career ==
As of 2025, Elias has live tournament winnings of over $14,000,000. His cashes on the World Poker Tour make up over $4,800,000 of his total winnings. He is ranked #1 all-time in victories, final tables, and cashes on the World Poker Tour. Elias is often referred to as "The End Boss," a moniker that reflects his formidable presence at the poker table and the challenge he presents to opponents, akin to the final adversary in a video game.

Elias has served as BetMGM's Poker Ambassador since 2021.

=== World Poker Tour ===
Year	Tournament	Prize (US$)
2014	Borgata Poker Open	$843,744
2014	WPT Caribbean	$127,680
2017	Fallsview Poker Classic	$335,436
2018	Bobby Baldwin Classic	$387,580

== Media appearances ==
In 2025, he has appeared in a video for Insider, where he discusses the rules, methods, and procedures of poker and rates the accuracy of well-known television shows and movies, such as Rounders, Casino Royale, The Simpsons, and The Sting.
