= Chino Rheem =

American poker player (born 1980)

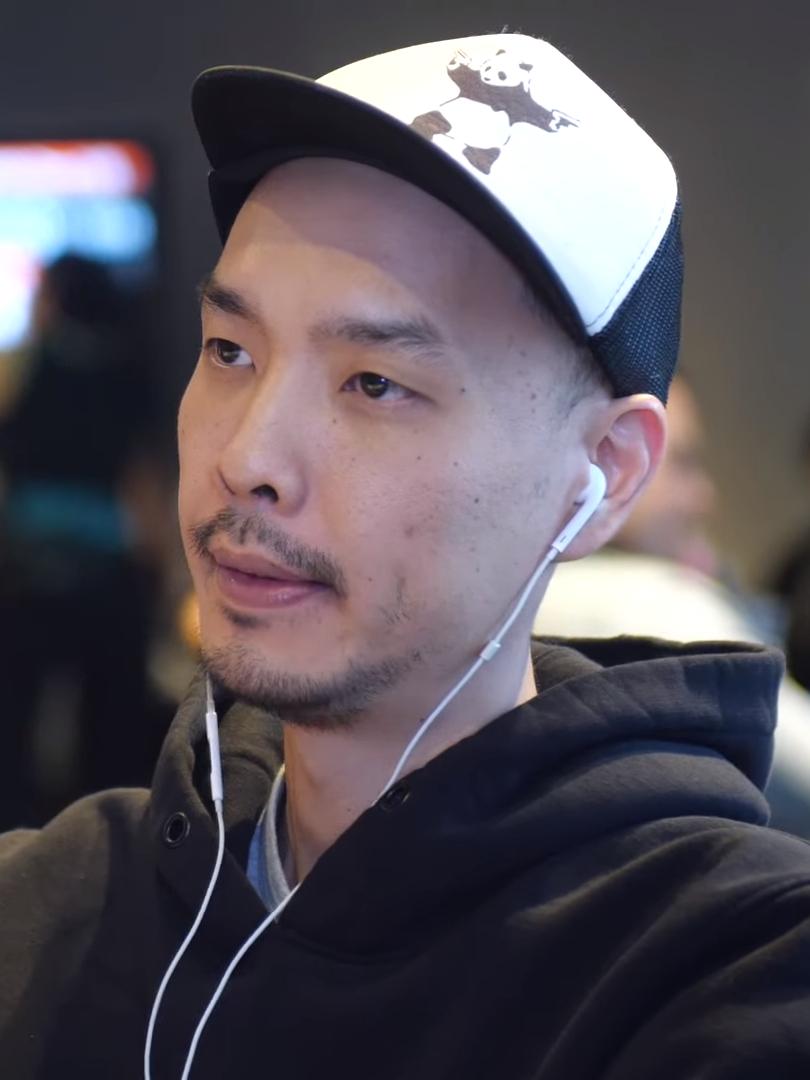
- Chino Rheem in 2019
- Born: April 15, 1980 (age 46)

World Series of Poker
- Bracelet: None
- Final tables: 4
- Money finishes: 23
- Highest WSOP Main Event finish: 7th, 2008

World Poker Tour
- Titles: 3
- Final tables: 4
- Money finishes: 7

European Poker Tour
- Title: None
- Final table: None
- Money finishes: 2

David Yongtaek "Chino" Rheem (born April 15, 1980) is a poker player from Los Angeles, California. In November 2008, Rheem finished in seventh place at the 2008 World Series of Poker Main Event, cashing for $1,772,650. He went out of this event on A♠ K♣ to Peter Eastgate's A♥ Q♦ with Eastgate flopping a pair of queens on a board of Q♠ 5♠ 7♦ 9♦ 4♥. He is also the winner of the World Poker Tour's Season VII Doyle Brunson Five Diamond World Poker Classic, earning $1,538,730. Rheem had five previous WSOP cashes, his best result being a runner-up finish to Allen Cunningham in a $1,000 no limit Texas hold 'em with rebuys event in 2006. He cashed in the 2005 World Series of Poker Main Event, finishing 193rd place. He also made a final table earlier in 2008, finishing in fifth place in the $5,000 Mixed Hold'em event.

In August 2011, Rheem won the $20,000 buy-in 6-Max No Limit Hold'em tournament at the inaugural Epic Poker League earning $1,000,000. One week later his membership in the league was placed on probation. Admittedly, owing several poker players considerable debts, he has since made payments on said debts.

He won the 2013 World Poker Tour Championship event, beating Erick Lindgren heads up, to win $1,150,297. Rheem won his third WPT title in April 2016 at the Seminole Hard Rock Poker Finale.

In 2019, Rheem won the PokerStars Caribbean Adventure $10,300 PCA Main Event winning, $1,567,100.

As of 2018, his total lifetime live poker tournament winnings exceed $8,800,000.
