= Cary Katz =

American businessman and poker player (born 1970)

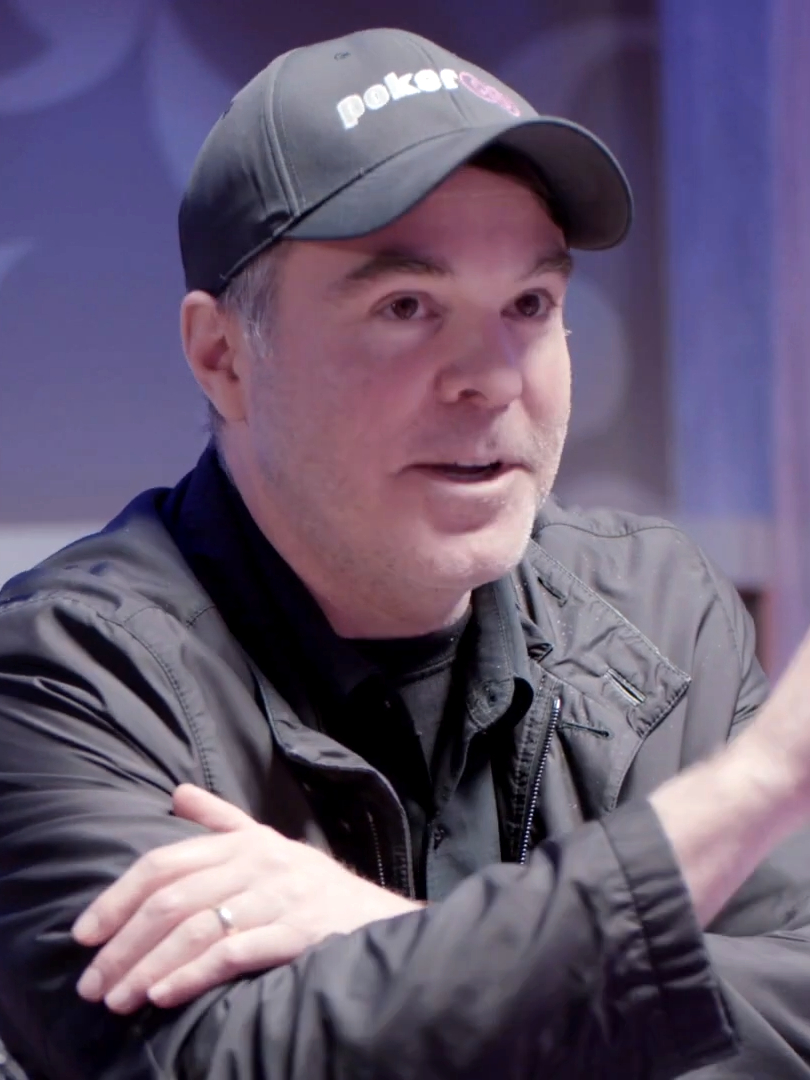
- Katz in 2018
- Born: January 29, 1970 (age 56)
- Favourite hand: A♠ A♥
World Series of Poker
- Bracelet: 1
- Money finishes: 46
- Highest WSOP Main Event finish: 159th, 2009
World Poker Tour
- Title: None
- Final table: 1
- Money finishes: 6

Cary Steven Katz (born January 29, 1970) is an American businessman and poker player.

== Career ==
Katz graduated from University of Georgia with a bachelor's degree in Business Administration. In 1999, he founded the College Loan Corporation, where he was CEO for 15 years. The company was the seventh largest student loan company in the United States providing $19 billion in loans.

Katz started the conservative media website CRTV in 2014. In 2018, he filed a lawsuit against CRTV over alleged non-payment of a $20 million loan.

In October 2015, Katz founded the website Poker Central which launched subscription-based streaming service PokerGO. Katz also created high roller tournaments including Super High Roller Bowl, Poker Masters, and the U.S. Poker Open.

He currently serves as chairman of the non-profit organization Stop Child Predators.

Katz is married to Jackie Katz and they have six children together and currently reside in Las Vegas, Nevada.

== Poker ==
Katz learned poker from his grandmother and began playing live tournaments competitively in 2004.

In August 2005, Katz finished 21st in the $5,000 World Poker Tour Legends of Poker Main Event, earning $20,850. In 2009, Katz finished 159th in the 2009 World Series of Poker Main Event, earning $40,288.

In January 2013, Katz entered the PokerStars Caribbean Adventure $100,000 high roller event, finishing fourth for $543,800. Later that year, he finished runner up to Davidi Kitai at the 2013 World Series of Poker $5,000 Pot Limit Hold'em event.

In 2014, Katz played in the $1,000,000 Big One for One Drop, where he finished eighth, earning $1,306,667. The tournament had a memorable hand where Katz's A♠ A♥ cracked Connor Drinan's A♣ A♦ after both were all in pre-flop. The board ran out 2♦ K♥ 5♥ 4♥ 2♥, giving Katz an ace-high flush.

Katz plays in Las Vegas high roller events hosted at the Aria Casino. In January 2018, Cary Katz won his first major poker tournament, placing first in a field of 48 entries to win the PCA Super High Roller and earning $1,492,340.

In September 2019, Katz won Super High Roller Bowl London. Katz defeated Ali Imsirovic heads-up to earn £2,100,000.

In February 2020, Katz finished third in Super High Roller Bowl Australia for AU$640,000.

In July 2021, Katz won the 2021 PokerGO Cup Main Event for $1,058,000.

In January 2023, Katz was crowned the 2023 PokerGO Cup champion after cashing five times and winning $655,800 in prize money.

As of December 2025, Katz has cashed for over $42,100,000 in live poker tournaments.
