= Dan Shak =

American poker player and hedge fund manager (born 1959)

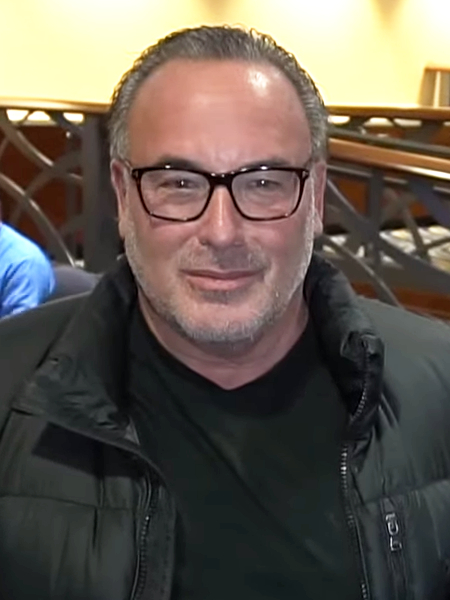
- Dan Shak in 2019
- Born: May 7, 1959 (age 67)

World Series of Poker
- Bracelet: None
- Money finishes: 20
- Highest WSOP Main Event finish: 167th, 2012

World Poker Tour
- Title: None
- Final table: None
- Money finishes: 10

European Poker Tour
- Title: None
- Final table: None
- Money finishes: 3

Daniel Shak (born May 7, 1959) is an American semi-professional poker player and hedge fund manager known for his accomplishments in high buy-in poker events.

== Poker career ==
Prior to poker, Shak was a trader on the New York Mercantile and Commodities Exchange (COMEX). In 2002, Shak established SHK Asset Management, a hedge fund focused on gold futures.

He began seriously focusing on poker in 2004. In 2005, he had his first World Series of Poker cash totaling $45,000. He has been active on the circuit since and came close to winning his first WSOP bracelet in 2010 when he came in second to Chris Bell at the $5,000 Pot-Limit Omaha Hi-Low Split-8 or Better event.

Shak has participated in the World Poker Tour, though he has been less successful. He cashed for $70,000 at the 2007 North American Poker Championships in Ontario. Shak has been most successful at the Aussie Millions where he scored his biggest cash of $1,107,553 in the 2010 $100,000 buy-in event.

In March 2013, Shak won the $125,000 Party Poker Premier League Poker VI in London winning $528,000, defeating Sam Trickett heads-up.

Shak has always considered poker a hobby and turned down any business offers related to it. However, in 2013, at the request of his friend Phil Ivey, Shak made an exception and joined Ivey Poker.

As of 2014, his total live tournament winnings exceeded $7,400,000 of which $709,290 came from cashes at the WSOP.

== Personal life ==
Shak is the son of Paula J. Felmeister (née Cohen). He was married to poker player and model Beth Shak; the two divorced in 2009. In 2012, Dan Shak sued Beth over a shoe collection containing 1,200 shoes worth approximately $1 million, but then subsequently dropped the lawsuit. In 2014, Dan Shak married former model Anna Shak. He was recently charged with manipulating the gold and silver markets.
