= Isaac Haxton =

American poker player (born 1985)

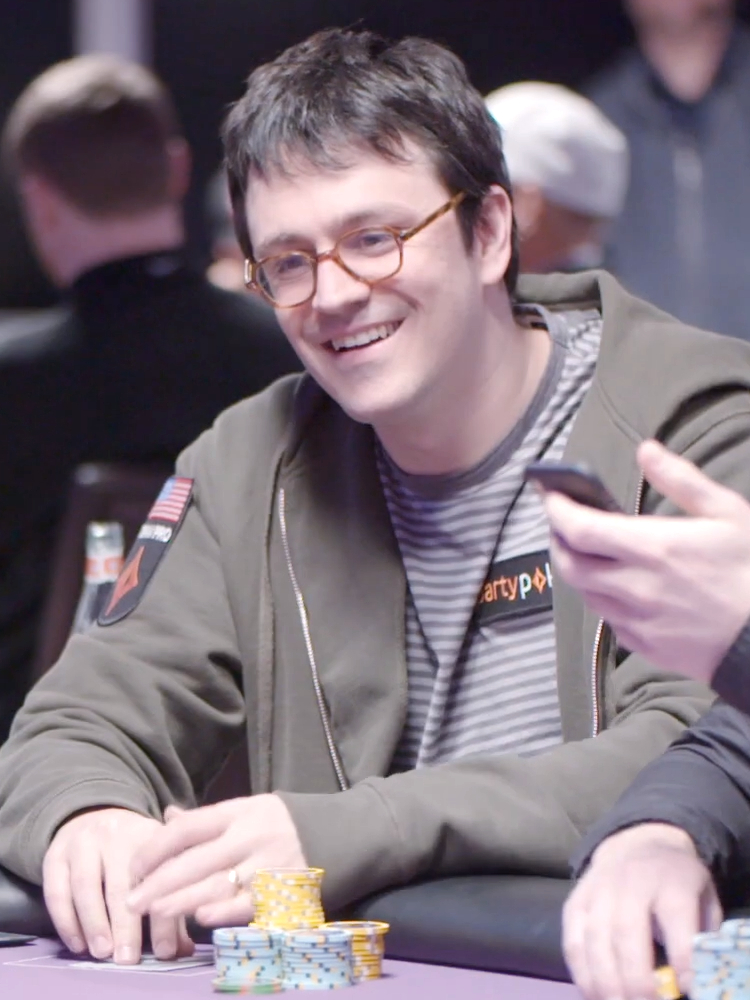
- Haxton in 2018
- Born: September 6, 1985 (age 41)
- Playtime: Chess (learning); Magic the Gathering (card); Poker (virtual)
World Series of Poker
- Bracelet: 1
- Final tables: 7
- Money finishes: 32
- Highest WSOP Main Event finish: 94th, 2007
World Poker Tour
- Title: None
- Final tables: 4
- Money finishes: 8
European Poker Tour
- Title: None
- Final tables: 11
- Money finishes: 21

Isaac Haxton (born September 6, 1985) is an American professional poker player, amateur chess player, and a youth chess champion.

== Early life ==
Haxton was raised in Syracuse, New York. His mother is a psychiatrist and his father is an English professor who introduced Isaac to games of skill at an early age. He played chess at the age of four and Magic: The Gathering by the age of ten.

After high school Haxton attended Brown University as a computer science major, but later spent more time playing poker than studying. He returned to Brown and completed a degree in Philosophy.

== Poker career ==
After turning 18, Haxton transitioned from competitive Magic: The Gathering to playing poker at the Turning Stone Casino in Verona, New York starting at $3/$6 limit before slowly moving up in stakes. He transitioned to online poker with a $50 deposit on Ultimate Bet.

In 2007, he cashed in his first tournament at the WPT Championship Event finishing runner-up to Ryan Daut for $861,789.

In September 2018, Haxton won Event #4: $10,000 Short Deck at the 2018 Poker Masters for $176,000.

In December 2018, Haxton won Super High Roller Bowl V for $3,672,000.

In January 2023, Haxton won the 2023 PokerGO Cup $50,000 No-Limit Hold'em finale for $598,000. The next week, Haxton won the 2023 PokerStars Caribbean Adventure $100,000 PCA Super High Roller for $1,082,230. He won a second $100,000 buy in event at the PCA less than two weeks later for over 1,500,000.

In June 2023, Haxton won his first bracelet at the 2023 World Series of Poker $25,000 High Roller No-Limit Hold'em 8-Handed event for $1,698,215 . In September of that year, Haxton won The Super High Roller Bowl, defeating Andrew Lichtenberger heads up and earning over $2.7 million. In 2023, Haxton had the most live tournament earnings of any poker player, earning more than $16 million throughout 2023.

As of May 2024, Haxton has cashed for more than $48,000,000 in live poker tournaments.

=== World Series of Poker bracelets ===
Year	Tournament	Prize (US$)
2023	$25,000 High Roller No-Limit Hold'em 8-Handed	$1,698,215

=== Online poker ===
Haxton is considered one of the top online cash game specialists and plays under the aliases, Ike Haxton, luvtheWNBA, and philivey2694 where he has earned over $2,000,000. Although successful in tournament play, he prefers online cash games and considers it to be his specialty.

== PokerGo Tour Titles ==
Year	Tournament	Prize $
2022	ARIA High Roller #24 – $15,000 NLH	$50,400
2023	PokerGO Cup #8 - $50,000 NLH	$598,000
2023	U.S. Poker Open #8: $25,000 No-Limit Hold'em	$432,000
2023	WSOP #16 - $25,000 High Roller NLH	$1,698,215
2023	Super High Roller Bowl VIII - $300,000 NLH	$2,760,000
2024	Poker Masters #6 - $15,100 No-Limit Hold'em	$352,800
2024	PGT PLO Series II #5 - $15,100 Pot-Limit Omaha Progressive Bounty ($6,000)	$169,740

== Triton Titles ==
Festival	Tournament	Prize $
Jeju II 2025	$100k PLO Main Event	$2,789,000

== Personal life ==
Haxton is married to his wife Zoe. His father wrote his biography, Fading Hearts on the River: My Son’s Life in Poker.
