= Alex Foxen =

American poker player (born 1991)

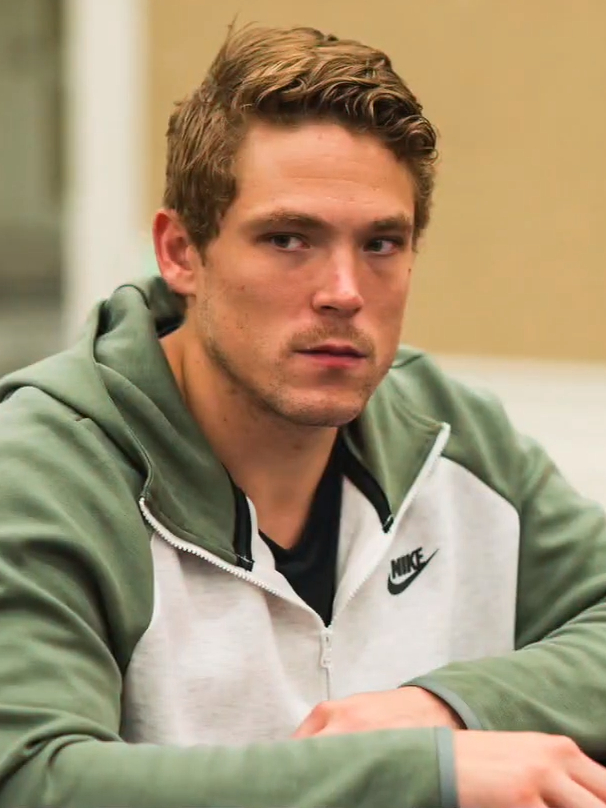
- Foxen in 2019
- Born: William Alex Foxen; February 1, 1991 (age 35); Cold Spring Harbor, New York, U.S.

World Series of Poker
- Bracelets: 4
- Highest WSOP Main Event finish: 40th, 2019

World Poker Tour
- Title: 1

William Alex Foxen (born February 1, 1991) is an American professional poker player from Cold Spring Harbor, New York. As of July 2026, his tracked live tournament earnings exceed $60 million across more than 480 recorded cashes, placing him among the top 10 players on the all-time money list.

== Early life ==
Foxen played tight end (#44) for the Boston College Eagles in NCAA Division I football. In May 2012, at the age of 21, he won the first event he entered on the World Series of Poker Circuit in New Orleans, earning his first Circuit ring. He graduated from Boston College's Carroll School of Management in 2014.

Foxen played online poker for a couple of years before transitioning to live poker in earnest in 2016.

Foxen is the son of Denise and the late William Foxen and was a three-sport athlete at Cold Spring Harbor High School, where he played football, ice hockey and lacrosse before earning a football scholarship to Boston College. His first Circuit win came in a $365 No-Limit Hold'em event that paid $22,421, and online he played under the screen name "bigfox86" on PokerStars.

== Career ==
=== World Series of Poker (WSOP) ===
At the 2019 World Series of Poker, Foxen finished 40th in the Main Event for $211,945.

In 2021, Foxen publicly opposed the WSOP's decision to require COVID-19 vaccinations for players, describing the policy as a mistake in a series of posts on Twitter. He and his wife Kristen Foxen both skipped that year's live series.

In June 2022, Foxen won his first WSOP bracelet by capturing the $250,000 Super High Roller, earning a career-high $4,563,700. The final table included Phil Ivey in seventh place and Adrián Mateos in fourth.

In October 2024, Foxen won his second WSOP bracelet in the WSOP Online $500 Pot-Limit Omaha Mystery Bounty 6-Max event. Two months later, at WSOP Paradise 2024, he won his third bracelet in the $100,000 Triton No-Limit Hold'em Main Event for $3,850,000, defeating João Vieira heads-up at a final table that also featured Fedor Holz.

At the 2025 World Series of Poker, Foxen finished runner-up in the $250,000 Super High Roller to Seth Davies for $3,060,314 and won the $25,000 Heads-Up No-Limit Hold'em Championship after defeating Phil Ivey in a bracket match during the event.

Foxen won his fourth WSOP bracelet at the 2026 World Series of Poker in a $10,000 No-Limit Hold'em Super Turbo Bounty event for $594,246.

=== World Poker Tour (WPT) ===
In December 2017, Foxen finished second in the WPT Five Diamond World Poker Classic on the World Poker Tour, earning $1,134,202.

In 2019, Foxen won the Season XVIII WPT Five Diamond World Poker Classic, earning $1,694,995 and securing his second consecutive Global Poker Index Player of the Year title.

=== PokerGO Tour (PGT) ===
In 2018, Foxen finished as the runner-up in the Super High Roller Bowl V after a competitive heads-up battle against Isaac Haxton, earning $2,160,000.

In April 2025, Foxen won his eighth career PGT title, earning $315,000 at the PokerGO Studio and ending an 803-day drought. The win kicked off a dominant 2025 season in which he added four more PGT titles across the U.S. Poker Open, Poker Masters, and PGT PLO Series, and in January 2026 he won the PGT Last Chance Series closer for $232,400 to lift his career PGT title total to twelve.

Foxen also became the first player in PGT history to reach 100 career cashes and to surpass 10,000 career points.

=== Triton Poker Series ===
In November 2024, Foxen won the $50,000 No-Limit Hold'em 8-Handed at the Triton Poker Series stop in Monte-Carlo for $1,470,000. The following month, at WSOP Paradise 2024, he won the $100,000 Triton No-Limit Hold'em Main Event for $3,850,000, which counted toward both his Triton and WSOP records. He added a third Triton title in Montenegro in May 2025 in the $25,000 8-Handed event for $755,000, and a fourth in April 2026 in the $75,000 Pot-Limit Omaha 6-Max at Triton Jeju for $1,260,000, defeating Eelis Parssinen heads-up.

=== Other notable tournaments ===
In February 2018, Foxen won a $25,000 High Roller event at the L.A. Poker Classic, earning $424,625. His success continued through 2018 with deep runs on the Asia Pacific Poker Tour in Macau and at The Venetian in Las Vegas, including a MSPT Venetian Main Event victory over his future wife Kristen Foxen in heads-up play.

=== Player of the Year ===
Foxen won the 2018 Global Poker Index Player of the Year (POY) title after overtaking Stephen Chidwick down the stretch. His 2018 results included 24 recorded cashes, 18 final table appearances, and five titles, including a runner-up finish in the Super High Roller Bowl and a title on the Asia Pacific Poker Tour in Macau.

Following his POY win, Foxen was ranked No. 1 on the Global Poker Index for 38 consecutive weeks from late 2018 into mid-2019.

Foxen repeated as GPI Player of the Year in 2019, becoming the first player in the history of the award to win it in consecutive years.

In January 2026, Foxen was crowned 2025 PokerGO Tour Player of the Year after a photo-finish race that came down to the final event of the season. He clinched the title with a fifth 2025 PGT win at the PGT Last Chance Series closer, finishing with 3,134 PGT points, 27 cashes, five titles, and $6,277,148 in tracked PGT earnings, plus a $50,000 PGT Passport bonus. The result made him one of the few players to hold both the GPI and PGT Player of the Year titles.

=== Other poker activities ===
In April 2022, Foxen publicly accused Ali Imsirovic of cheating in both live and online high-stakes poker, citing specific instances of hole carding at Triton events and online multi-accounting. Justin Bonomo and Matt Berkey corroborated some of the claims. Imsirovic and Jake Schindler were subsequently banned from GGPoker and PokerGO Tour events. Imsirovic later admitted to multi-accounting while disputing other aspects of the allegations.

== Personal life ==
Foxen is married to fellow professional poker player Kristen Foxen (née Bicknell). In June 2018, he defeated her heads-up to win the MSPT Venetian Main Event. The couple married in the Florida Keys in April 2022.

== World Series of Poker bracelets ==
Year	Tournament	Prize (US$)
2022	$250,000 Super High Roller No-Limit Hold'em	$4,563,700
2024 O	$500 Pot-Limit Omaha Mystery Bounty 6-Max	$20,064
2024 P	$100,000 Triton No-Limit Hold'em Main Event	$3,850,000
2026	$10,000 No-Limit Hold'em Super Turbo Bounty	$594,246

An "O" following a year denotes bracelet(s) won during the World Series of Poker Online. A "P" following a year denotes bracelet(s) won during the World Series of Poker Paradise.

== PokerGO Tour titles ==
Year	Tournament	Prize (US$)
2021	PokerGO Cup #1 – $10,000 NLH	$178,200
2021	ARIA High Roller #32 – $10,000 NLH	$150,845
2022	Venetian High Roller #3 – $15,000 NLH	$153,615
2022	U.S. Poker Open #7 – $15,000 NLH	$283,500
2022	WSOP #50 – $250,000 Super High Roller NLH	$4,563,700
2022	ARIA High Roller #8 – $10,000 NLH	$88,118
2023	PokerGO Cup #6 – $25,000 NLH	$317,040
2025	PGT PLO Series #7 – $15,100 Pot-Limit Omaha	$315,000
2025	U.S. Poker Open #7 – $15,100 No-Limit Hold'em	$340,200
2025	Poker Masters #6 – $10,100 No-Limit Hold'em	$272,000
2025	PGT PLO Series II #2 – $5,100 Pot-Limit Omaha Quattro Bounty	$87,000 + $90,000
2026	PGT Last Chance #6 – $10,100 No-Limit Hold'em (Single Day Turbo)	$232,400

== Triton titles ==
Festival	Tournament	Prize (US$)
Monte-Carlo 2024	$50K NLH 8-Handed	$1,470,000
Paradise 2024	$100K Main Event	$3,850,000
Montenegro 2025	$25K NLH 8-Handed	$755,000
Jeju 2026	$75K PLO 6-Max	$1,260,000
