= 2021 PokerGO Tour =

Series of poker tournaments

2021 PokerGO Tour season
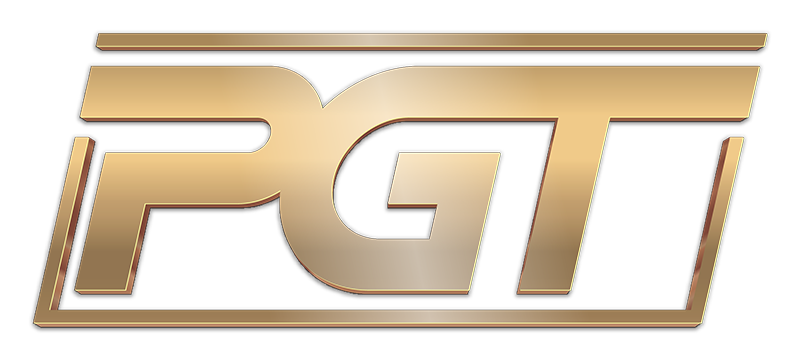
- Duration: January 28, 2021 - December 21, 2021
- Number of official events: 145
- Most wins: (Bosnia and Herzegovina) Ali Imsirovic (14)
- Guaranteed Rate Cup winner: (Bosnia and Herzegovina) Ali Imsirovic
- Money leader: (Australia) Michael Addamo ($9,418,837)

The 2021 PokerGO Tour was the first season of the PokerGO Tour and was presented by Guaranteed Rate. The season ran for 2021 with the first event beginning on January 28, and the final event concluding on December 21.

By finishing on top of the 2021 PokerGO Tour leaderboard, Ali Imsirovic became the first-ever PokerGO Tour champion and was awarded the Guaranteed Rate Cup and $200,000 in prize money.

== Leaderboard ==
The points leader at the end of the 2021 PokerGO Tour season would be awarded the Guaranteed Rate Cup and $200,000 in prize money, while second place earned $100,000, and third place earned $50,000. The leaderboard is published on the PokerGO Tour website.

2021 PokerGO Tour Leaderboard
Rank	Player	Points	Wins	Cashes	Earnings
1	(Bosnia and Herzegovina) Ali Imsirovic	4,364	14	34	$6,028,321
2	(Australia) Michael Addamo	3,083	6	8	$9,418,837
3	(United States) Sean Perry	2,525	6	23	$3,807,850
4	(United States) Sean Winter	2,263	2	20	$3,954,125
5	(United States) Sam Soverel	2,079	3	23	$3,697,009
6	(United States) Chris Brewer	2,079	4	27	$3,052,255
7	(Canada) Daniel Negreanu	1,983	2	17	$3,054,904
8	(United Kingdom) Stephen Chidwick	1,954	1	21	$2,909,320
9	(United States) David Peters	1,940	3	11	$4,461,670
10	(Germany) Koray Aldemir	1,936	1	2	$8,060,465

== Schedule ==
The full schedule and results for the 2021 PokerGO Tour is published on the website.

(#): This denotes the number of PokerGO Tour titles won at that point of 2021.

2021 PokerGO Tour Schedule
PGT #	Start date	Tournament	Buy-in	Type	Venue	Location	Winner	Prize	PGT Points	Entrants	Prize Pool
1	January 28	ARIA High Roller #1	$10,000	No-Limit Hold'em	ARIA Resort & Casino	Las Vegas	(United States) Dan Smith (1)	$136,000	136	34	$340,000
2	January 29	ARIA High Roller #2	$10,000	No-Limit Hold'em	ARIA Resort & Casino	Las Vegas	(United States) Cary Katz (1)	$82,800	83	22	$220,000
3	January 30	ARIA High Roller #3	$10,000	No-Limit Hold'em	ARIA Resort & Casino	Las Vegas	(United States) Chris Brewer (1)	$113,400	113	21	$210,000
4	February 25	ARIA High Roller #4	$25,000	No-Limit Hold'em	ARIA Resort & Casino	Las Vegas	(Bosnia and Herzegovina) Ali Imsirovic (1)	$185,800	111	14	$350,000
5	February 26	ARIA High Roller #5	$10,000	No-Limit Hold'em	ARIA Resort & Casino	Las Vegas	(United States) Sam Soverel (1)	$68,736	69	16	$160,000
6	February 27	ARIA High Roller #6	$50,000	No-Limit Hold'em	ARIA Resort & Casino	Las Vegas	(Bosnia and Herzegovina) Ali Imsirovic (2)	$344,910	207	14	$700,000
7	March 7	ARIA High Roller #7	$10,000	No-Limit Hold'em	ARIA Resort & Casino	Las Vegas	(Spain) Sergi Reixach (1)	$108,120	108	32	$320,000
8	March 8	ARIA High Roller #8	$10,000	No-Limit Hold'em	ARIA Resort & Casino	Las Vegas	(United States) Barry Hutter (1)	$140,400	140	39	$390,000
9	March 9	ARIA High Roller #9	$10,000	No-Limit Hold'em	ARIA Resort & Casino	Las Vegas	(United States) Darren Elias (1)	$169,600	170	53	$530,000
10	March 10	ARIA High Roller #10	$25,000	No-Limit Hold'em	ARIA Resort & Casino	Las Vegas	(United States) Sean Winter (1)	$408,000	245	48	$1,200,000
11	March 11	Wynn Spring Classic High Roller	$10,000	No-Limit Hold'em	Wynn Las Vegas	Las Vegas	(United States) Joe McKeehen (1)	$224,100	224	83	$830,000
12	March 19	L.A. Poker Classic	$10,000	No-Limit Hold'em	Commerce Casino	Los Angeles	(United States) Michael Liang (1)	$175,300	175	69	$655,500
13	March 31	ARIA High Roller #11	$10,000	No-Limit Hold'em	ARIA Resort & Casino	Las Vegas	(United States) Nick Petrangelo (1)	$126,980	127	44	$440,000
14	April 1	ARIA High Roller #12	$10,000	No-Limit Hold'em	ARIA Resort & Casino	Las Vegas	(United States) Sean Perry (1)	$169,600	170	53	$530,000
15	April 2	ARIA High Roller #13	$25,000	No-Limit Hold'em	ARIA Resort & Casino	Las Vegas	(Bosnia and Herzegovina) Ali Imsirovic (3)	$310,000	186	31	$775,000
16	April 3	ARIA High Roller #14	$25,000	No-Limit Hold'em	ARIA Resort & Casino	Las Vegas	(Bosnia and Herzegovina) Ali Imsirovic (4)	$300,000	180	30	$750,000
17	April 21	SHRPO Super High Roller	$50,000	No-Limit Hold'em	Seminole Hard Rock Hotel & Casino	Hollywood	(France) Arthur Conan (1)	$733,320	440	42	$2,100,000
18	April 26	SHRPO High Roller	$25,000	No-Limit Hold'em	Seminole Hard Rock Hotel & Casino	Hollywood	(United States) Chad Eveslage (1)	$767,576	461	145	$3,625,000
19	May 5	ARIA High Roller #15	$10,000	No-Limit Hold'em	ARIA Resort & Casino	Las Vegas	(Lithuania) Matas Cimbolas (1)	$163,200	163	51	$510,000
20	May 6	ARIA High Roller #16	$10,000	No-Limit Hold'em	ARIA Resort & Casino	Las Vegas	(Spain) Sergio Aido (1)	$159,800	160	47	$470,000
21	May 7	ARIA High Roller #17	$25,000	No-Limit Hold'em	ARIA Resort & Casino	Las Vegas	(United States) Bill Klein (1)	$324,000	194	36	$900,000
22	May 8	ARIA High Roller #18	$25,000	No-Limit Hold'em	ARIA Resort & Casino	Las Vegas	(United States) Jake Schindler (1)	$310,500	186	27	$675,000
23	May 27	Venetian High Roller #1	$10,000	No-Limit Hold'em	The Venetian Las Vegas	Las Vegas	(Bosnia and Herzegovina) Ali Imsirovic (5)	$200,200	200	77	$770,000
24	May 28	Venetian High Roller #2	$10,000	No-Limit Hold'em	The Venetian Las Vegas	Las Vegas	(United States) Shawn Daniels (1)	$175,500	176	65	$650,000
25	May 29	Venetian High Roller #3	$25,000	No-Limit Hold'em	The Venetian Las Vegas	Las Vegas	(United States) Sean Perry (2)	$365,600	219	43	$1,075,000
26	June 3	U.S. Poker Open #1	$10,000	No-Limit Hold'em	ARIA Resort & Casino	Las Vegas	(United States) Jake Daniels (1)	$218,500	219	95	$950,000
27	June 4	U.S. Poker Open #2	$10,000	Pot-Limit Omaha	ARIA Resort & Casino	Las Vegas	(United States) Sam Soverel (2)	$175,500	176	65	$650,000
28	June 5	U.S. Poker Open #3	$10,000	No-Limit Hold'em	ARIA Resort & Casino	Las Vegas	(United States) Joe McKeehen (2)	$200,200	200	77	$770,000
29	June 6	U.S. Poker Open #4	$10,000	Big Bet Mix	ARIA Resort & Casino	Las Vegas	(United States) John Riordan (1)	$163,200	163	48	$480,000
30	June 7	U.S. Poker Open #5	$10,000	No-Limit Hold'em	ARIA Resort & Casino	Las Vegas	(United States) Joey Weissman (1)	$204,000	204	85	$850,000
31	June 8	U.S. Poker Open #6	$10,000	8-Game	ARIA Resort & Casino	Las Vegas	(Israel) Eli Elezra (1)	$183,600	184	68	$680,000
32	June 9	U.S. Poker Open #7	$10,000	No-Limit Hold'em	ARIA Resort & Casino	Las Vegas	(United States) David Peters (1)	$217,800	218	99	$990,000
33	June 10	U.S. Poker Open #8	$10,000	Pot-Limit Omaha	ARIA Resort & Casino	Las Vegas	(United States) Jared Bleznick (1)	$189,000	189	63	$630,000
34	June 11	U.S. Poker Open #9	$10,000	No-Limit Hold'em	ARIA Resort & Casino	Las Vegas	(Bosnia and Herzegovina) Ali Imsirovic (6)	$217,800	218	99	$990,000
35	June 12	U.S. Poker Open #10	$10,000	Short Deck	ARIA Resort & Casino	Las Vegas	(United States) David Peters (2)	$124,200	124	27	$270,000
36	June 13	U.S. Poker Open #11	$25,000	No-Limit Hold'em	ARIA Resort & Casino	Las Vegas	(United States) David Peters (3)	$465,750	279	69	$1,725,000
37	June 14	U.S. Poker Open #12	$50,000	No-Limit Hold'em	ARIA Resort & Casino	Las Vegas	(United States) Sean Winter (2)	$756,000	454	42	$2,100,000
38	June 15	ARIA High Roller #19	$25,000	No-Limit Hold'em	ARIA Resort & Casino	Las Vegas	(United States) Sean Perry (3)	$275,160	165	28	$675,000
39	June 25	Wynn Millions	$10,000	No-Limit Hold'em	Wynn Las Vegas	Las Vegas	(United States) Andrew Moreno (1)	$1,460,105	1,200	1,328	$12,483,200
40	July 6	PokerGO Cup #1	$10,000	No-Limit Hold'em	ARIA Resort & Casino	Las Vegas	(United States) Alex Foxen (1)	$178,200	178	66	$660,000
41	July 7	PokerGO Cup #2	$10,000	No-Limit Hold'em	ARIA Resort & Casino	Las Vegas	(Bosnia and Herzegovina) Ali Imsirovic (7)	$183,000	183	61	$610,000
42	July 8	PokerGO Cup #3	$10,000	No-Limit Hold'em	ARIA Resort & Casino	Las Vegas	(United States) Dylan Linde (1)	$169,600	170	53	$530,000
43	July 9	PokerGO Cup #4	$15,000	No-Limit Hold'em	ARIA Resort & Casino	Las Vegas	(Bosnia and Herzegovina) Ali Imsirovic (8)	$240,000	240	50	$750,000
44	July 10	PokerGO Cup #5	$25,000	No-Limit Hold'em	ARIA Resort & Casino	Las Vegas	(United States) Jake Schindler (2)	$324,000	194	36	$900,000
45	July 11	PokerGO Cup #6	$25,000	No-Limit Hold'em	ARIA Resort & Casino	Las Vegas	(United States) Jason Koon (1)	$324,000	194	36	$900,000
46	July 12	PokerGO Cup #7	$50,000	No-Limit Hold'em	ARIA Resort & Casino	Las Vegas	(Canada) Daniel Negreanu (1)	$700,000	420	35	$1,750,000
47	July 13	PokerGO Cup #8	$100,000	No-Limit Hold'em	ARIA Resort & Casino	Las Vegas	(United States) Cary Katz (2)	$1,058,000	400	23	$2,300,000
48	July 14	ARIA High Roller #20	$10,000	No-Limit Hold'em	ARIA Resort & Casino	Las Vegas	(United States) Sean Perry (4)	$81,000	81	15	$150,000
49	July 15	ARIA High Roller #21	$15,000	No-Limit Hold'em	ARIA Resort & Casino	Las Vegas	(United States) Anuj Agarwal (1)	$151,800	152	22	$330,000
50	August 4	SHRPO Super High Roller	$50,000	No-Limit Hold'em	Seminole Hard Rock Hotel & Casino	Hollywood	(United States) Chris Brewer (2)	$420,670	252	24	$1,164,000
51	August 5	SHRPO Super High Roller	$50,000	No-Limit Hold'em	Seminole Hard Rock Hotel & Casino	Hollywood	(United States) Zhuan Ruan (1)	$562,600	338	29	$1,406,500
52	August 8	SHRPO Freezeout	$15,000	No-Limit Hold'em	Seminole Hard Rock Hotel & Casino	Hollywood	(United States) Matthew Sabia (1)	$155,515	156	27	$388,800
53	August 9	SHRPO The Big 4	$25,000	No-Limit Hold'em	Seminole Hard Rock Hotel & Casino	Hollywood	(United States) Joe McKeehen (3)	$550,990	331	91	$2,247,700
54	August 10	SHRPO No-Limit Hold'em	$10,000	No-Limit Hold'em	Seminole Hard Rock Hotel & Casino	Hollywood	(United States) Sam Soverel (3)	$293,205	293	101	$969,600
55	August 12	Venetian High Roller #4	$10,000	No-Limit Hold'em	The Venetian Las Vegas	Las Vegas	(United States) Andrew Lichtenberger (1)	$120,000	120	30	$300,000
56	August 13	Venetian High Roller #5	$10,000	No-Limit Hold'em	The Venetian Las Vegas	Las Vegas	(Bosnia and Herzegovina) Ali Imsirovic (9)	$136,000	136	34	$340,000
57	August 14	Venetian High Roller #6	$25,000	No-Limit Hold'em	The Venetian Las Vegas	Las Vegas	(United States) Sean Perry (5)	$290,000	174	29	$725,000
58	August 15	Venetian High Roller #7	$25,000	No-Limit Hold'em	The Venetian Las Vegas	Las Vegas	(United States) Andrew Lichtenberger (2)	$125,350	75	14	$350,000
59	August 23	SHRS Europe #1	$25,000	Short Deck	Merit Royal Hotel & Casino	North Cyprus	(United States) Phil Ivey (1)	$408,000	245	48	$1,200,000
60	August 24	SHRS Europe #2	$25,000	No-Limit Hold'em	Merit Royal Hotel & Casino	North Cyprus	(France) Johan Guilbert (1)	$506,250	304	81	$2,025,000
61	August 25	SHRS Europe #3	$25,000	Short Deck	Merit Royal Hotel & Casino	North Cyprus	(Lithuania) Tony G (1)	$382,500	230	45	$1,125,000
62	August 26	SHRS Europe #4	$50,000	No-Limit Hold'em	Merit Royal Hotel & Casino	North Cyprus	(Turkey) Selahaddin Bedir (1)	$832,000	499	52	$2,600,000
63	August 27	SHRS Europe #5	$50,000	Short Deck	Merit Royal Hotel & Casino	North Cyprus	(Spain) Santi Jiang (1)	$756,000	454	42	$2,100,000
64	August 28	SHRS Europe #6	$100,000	No-Limit Hold'em	Merit Royal Hotel & Casino	North Cyprus	(Russia) Artur Martirosian (1)	$1,400,000	400	35	$3,500,000
65	August 29	SHRS Europe #7	$100,000	Short Deck	Merit Royal Hotel & Casino	North Cyprus	(Lithuania) Tony G (2)	$1,196,000	400	26	$2,600,000
66	August 30	Super High Roller Bowl Europe	$250,000	No-Limit Hold'em	Merit Royal Hotel & Casino	North Cyprus	(Poland) Wiktor Malinowski (1)	$3,690,000	600	41	$10,250,000
67	August 31	SHRS Europe #8	$50,000	Short Deck	Merit Royal Hotel & Casino	North Cyprus	(United States) Seth Davies (1)	$435,400	261	19	$950,000
68	September 1	SHRS Europe #9	$50,000	No-Limit Hold'em	Merit Royal Hotel & Casino	North Cyprus	(Bosnia and Herzegovina) Ali Imsirovic (10)	$598,000	359	26	$1,300,000
69	September 7	Poker Masters #1	$10,000	No-Limit Hold'em	ARIA Resort & Casino	Las Vegas	(United States) Shannon Shorr (1)	$205,000	205	82	$820,000
70	September 8	Poker Masters #2	$10,000	No-Limit Hold'em	ARIA Resort & Casino	Las Vegas	(United States) Sean Perry (6)	$206,400	206	84	$840,000
71	September 9	Poker Masters #3	$10,000	Pot-Limit Omaha	ARIA Resort & Casino	Las Vegas	(United States) Adam Hendrix (1)	$186,300	186	69	$690,000
72	September 10	Poker Masters #4	$10,000	No-Limit Hold'em	ARIA Resort & Casino	Las Vegas	(United States) Brock Wilson (1)	$189,800	190	73	$730,000
73	September 11	Poker Masters #5	$10,000	No-Limit Hold'em	ARIA Resort & Casino	Las Vegas	(Canada) Daniel Negreanu (2)	$178,200	178	66	$660,000
74	September 12	Poker Masters #6	$10,000	8-Game	ARIA Resort & Casino	Las Vegas	(United States) Maxx Coleman (1)	$120,000	120	30	$300,000
75	September 13	Poker Masters #7	$10,000	No-Limit Hold'em	ARIA Resort & Casino	Las Vegas	(United Kingdom) Stephen Chidwick (1)	$183,600	184	68	$680,000
76	September 14	Poker Masters #8	$25,000	No-Limit Hold'em	ARIA Resort & Casino	Las Vegas	(United States) Chris Brewer (3)	$427,500	257	57	$1,425,000
77	September 15	Poker Masters #9	$25,000	Pot-Limit Omaha	ARIA Resort & Casino	Las Vegas	(United States) Miles Rampel (1)	$365,500	219	43	$1,075,000
78	September 16	Poker Masters #10	$25,000	No-Limit Hold'em	ARIA Resort & Casino	Las Vegas	(Belarus) Mikita Badziakouski (1)	$342,000	205	38	$950,000
79	September 17	Poker Masters #11	$50,000	No-Limit Hold'em	ARIA Resort & Casino	Las Vegas	(Australia) Michael Addamo (1)	$680,000	408	34	$1,700,000
80	September 18	Poker Masters #12	$100,000	No-Limit Hold'em	ARIA Resort & Casino	Las Vegas	(Australia) Michael Addamo (2)	$1,160,000	400	29	$2,900,000
81	September 26	ARIA High Roller #23	$50,000	No-Limit Hold'em	ARIA Resort & Casino	Las Vegas	(Bosnia and Herzegovina) Ali Imsirovic (11)	$529,000	317	23	$1,150,000
82	September 27	Super High Roller Bowl VI	$300,000	No-Limit Hold'em	ARIA Resort & Casino	Las Vegas	(Australia) Michael Addamo (3)	$3,402,000	600	21	$6,300,000
83	September 29	ARIA High Roller #24	$25,000	No-Limit Hold'em	ARIA Resort & Casino	Las Vegas	(Bosnia and Herzegovina) Ali Imsirovic (12)	$192,500	116	11	$275,000
84	September 30	WSOP #2	$25,000	H.O.R.S.E.	Rio All-Suite Hotel & Casino	Las Vegas	(United States) Jesse Klein (1)	$552,182	552	78	$1,842,750
85	October 1	ARIA High Roller #25	$10,000	No-Limit Hold'em	ARIA Resort & Casino	Las Vegas	(Spain) Adrian Mateos (1)	$113,199	113	30	$300,000
86	October 2	WSOP #6	$25,000	No-Limit Hold'em	Rio All-Suite Hotel & Casino	Las Vegas	(United States) Tyler Cornell (1)	$833,289	500	139	$3,283,875
87	October 4	WSOP #9	$10,000	Omaha Hi-Lo	Rio All-Suite Hotel & Casino	Las Vegas	(Canada) Ari Engel (1)	$317,076	317	128	$1,249,550
88	October 5	WSOP #11	$25,000	No-Limit Hold'em	Rio All-Suite Hotel & Casino	Las Vegas	(United States) Jason Koon (2)	$243,981	146	57	$1,346,625
89	October 7	WSOP #16	$10,000	Limit Hold'em	Rio All-Suite Hotel & Casino	Las Vegas	(United States) John Monnette (1)	$245,680	246	92	$857,900
90	October 8	ARIA High Roller #25	$100,000	No-Limit Hold'em	ARIA Resort & Casino	Las Vegas	(United States) Jake Schindler (3)	$655,000	197	22	$2,200,000
91	October 9	ARIA High Roller #26	$200,000	No-Limit Hold'em	ARIA Resort & Casino	Las Vegas	(United States) Nick Petrangelo (2)	$1,468,800	400	17	$3,400,000
92	October 10	WSOP #19	$10,000	Seven-Card Stud	Rio All-Suite Hotel & Casino	Las Vegas	(United States) Anthony Zinno (1)	$182,872	183	62	$578,150
93	October 13	ARIA High Roller #27	$10,000	No-Limit Hold'em	ARIA Resort & Casino	Las Vegas	(United States) Elio Fox (1)	$67,791	68	22	$220,000
94	October 14	WSOP #29	$10,000	Short Deck	Rio All-Suite Hotel & Casino	Las Vegas	(United States) Chance Kornuth (1)	$194,670	195	66	$615,450
95	October 18	WSOP #36	$10,000	Dealer's Choice	Rio All-Suite Hotel & Casino	Las Vegas	(United States) Adam Friedman (1)	$248,350	248	93	$867,225
96	October 19	WSOP #38	$50,000	No-Limit Hold'em	Rio All-Suite Hotel & Casino	Las Vegas	(Australia) Michael Addamo (4)	$1,132,968	700	81	$3,877,875
97	October 20	WSOP #40	$10,000	H.O.R.S.E.	Rio All-Suite Hotel & Casino	Las Vegas	(United States) Kevin Gerhart (1)	$361,124	361	149	$1,389,425
98	October 23	WSOP #45	$10,000	Pot-Limit Omaha	Rio All-Suite Hotel & Casino	Las Vegas	(United States) Tommy Le (1)	$746,477	746	344	$3,207,800
99	October 25	WSOP #49	$10,000	No-Limit 2-7 Single Draw	Rio All-Suite Hotel & Casino	Las Vegas	(Iran) Farzad Bonyadi (1)	$297,051	297	122	$1,137,650
100	October 27	WSOP #53	$25,000	Pot-Limit Omaha	Rio All-Suite Hotel & Casino	Las Vegas	(United States) Shaun Deeb (1)	$1,251,860	700	212	$5,008,500
101	October 28	ARIA High Roller #28	$15,000	No-Limit Hold'em	ARIA Resort & Casino	Las Vegas	(Australia) Michael Addamo (5)	$219,300	219	43	$645,000
102	October 29	WSOP #56	$10,000	No-Limit Hold'em	Rio All-Suite Hotel & Casino	Las Vegas	(United States) Ben Yu (1)	$721,453	721	329	$3,067,925
103	October 30	WSOP #57	$10,000	2-7 Triple Draw	Rio All-Suite Hotel & Casino	Las Vegas	(United States) Brian Yoon (1)	$240,341	240	80	$839,250
104	October 31	WSOP #60	$50,000	Poker Players Championship	Rio All-Suite Hotel & Casino	Las Vegas	(United States) Daniel Cates (1)	$954,020	572	63	$3,016,125
105	November 3	WSOP #66	$10,000	Pot-Limit Omaha Hi-Lo	Rio All-Suite Hotel & Casino	Las Vegas	(United States) Josh Arieh (1)	$484,791	485	208	$1,939,600
106	November 4	WSOP #67 Main Event	$10,000	No-Limit Hold'em	Rio All-Suite Hotel & Casino	Las Vegas	(Germany) Koray Aldemir (1)	$8,000,000	1,900	6,650	$62,011,250
107	November 4	ARIA High Roller #29	$10,000	No-Limit Hold'em	ARIA Resort & Casino	Las Vegas	(United States) Ren Lin (1)	$147,600	148	41	$410,000
108	November 5	ARIA High Roller #30	$10,000	No-Limit Hold'em	ARIA Resort & Casino	Las Vegas	(Bosnia and Herzegovina) Ali Imsirovic (13)	$120,000	120	30	$300,000
109	November 6	ARIA High Roller #31	$10,000	No-Limit Hold'em	ARIA Resort & Casino	Las Vegas	(United States) Justin Bonomo (1)	$171,000	171	57	$570,000
110	November 7	ARIA High Roller #32	$10,000	No-Limit Hold'em	ARIA Resort & Casino	Las Vegas	(United States) Alex Foxen (2)	$150,845	151	53	$530,000
111	November 8	ARIA High Roller #33	$10,000	No-Limit Hold'em	ARIA Resort & Casino	Las Vegas	(United States) Barry Hutter (2)	$183,000	183	61	$610,000
112	November 9	ARIA High Roller #34	$10,000	No-Limit Hold'em	ARIA Resort & Casino	Las Vegas	(Slovenia) Rok Gostisa (1)	$147,600	148	41	$410,000
113	November 10	ARIA High Roller #35	$10,000	No-Limit Hold'em	ARIA Resort & Casino	Las Vegas	(Spain) Sergi Reixach (2)	$172,800	173	54	$540,000
114	November 11	ARIA High Roller #36	$10,000	No-Limit Hold'em	ARIA Resort & Casino	Las Vegas	(United States) Vikenty Shegal (1)	$151,200	151	42	$420,000
115	November 12	ARIA High Roller #37	$10,000	No-Limit Hold'em	ARIA Resort & Casino	Las Vegas	(Germany) Leonard Maue (1)	$153,000	153	45	$450,000
116	November 13	ARIA High Roller #38	$10,000	No-Limit Hold'em	ARIA Resort & Casino	Las Vegas	(United States) Timothy Capretta (1)	$186,300	186	69	$690,000
117	November 13	WSOP #73	$10,000	Seven-Card Stud Hi-Lo	Rio All-Suite Hotel & Casino	Las Vegas	(United States) Brian Hastings (1)	$352,958	353	144	$1,342,800
118	November 15	WSOP #76	$10,000	No-Limit Hold'em	Rio All-Suite Hotel & Casino	Las Vegas	(France) Romain Lewis (1)	$463,885	464	307	$1,941,775
119	November 16	ARIA High Roller #39	$10,000	No-Limit Hold'em	ARIA Resort & Casino	Las Vegas	(United States) Jake Schindler (4)	$146,200	146	43	$430,000
120	November 16	WSOP #78	$10,000	Razz	Rio All-Suite Hotel & Casino	Las Vegas	(United Kingdom) Benny Glaser (1)	$274,693	275	109	$1,016,425
121	November 17	ARIA High Roller #40	$10,000	No-Limit Hold'em	ARIA Resort & Casino	Las Vegas	(United States) Chris Brewer (4)	$86,400	86	16	$160,000
122	November 18	WSOP #82	$250,000	No-Limit Hold'em	Rio All-Suite Hotel & Casino	Las Vegas	(Spain) Adrian Mateos (2)	$3,265,362	600	33	$8,217,000
123	November 19	WSOP #84	$50,000	Pot-Limit Omaha	Rio All-Suite Hotel & Casino	Las Vegas	(United States) Jeremy Ausmus (1)	$1,188,918	700	85	$4,069,375
124	November 20	WSOP #85	$50,000	No-Limit Hold'em	Rio All-Suite Hotel & Casino	Las Vegas	(Belarus) Mikita Badziakouski (2)	$1,462,043	113	113	$5,409,875
125	November 21	WSOP #87	$100,000	No-Limit Hold'em	Rio All-Suite Hotel & Casino	Las Vegas	(Australia) Michael Addamo (6)	$1,958,569	400	64	$6,192,000
126	November 29	WSOP Europe #11	€25,000	No-Limit Hold'em	King's Casino	Czech Republic	(Ukraine) Andriy Lyubovetskiy (1)	€518,430	311	72	€1,682,640
127	November 29	SRRPO High Roller	$25,000	No-Limit Hold'em	Seminole Hard Rock Hotel & Casino	Hollywood	(Bosnia and Herzegovina) Ali Imsirovic (14)	$695,355	417	102	$2,519,400
128	December 2	Bellagio High Roller #1	$10,000	No-Limit Hold'em	Bellagio Las Vegas	Las Vegas	(Venezuela) Giuseppe Iadisernia (1)	$146,200	146	43	$430,000
129	December 3	WSOP Europe #14	€10,000	No-Limit Hold'em	King's Casino	Czech Republic	(Czech Republic) Josef Gulas (1)	€1,276,712	1,200	688	€6,536,000
130	December 3	WSOP Europe #15	€10,000	No-Limit Hold'em	King's Casino	Czech Republic	(France) Romain Le Dantec (1)	€207,267	207	73	€672,695
131	December 3	Bellagio High Roller #2	$100,000	No-Limit Hold'em	Bellagio Las Vegas	Las Vegas	(United States) Justin Bonomo (2)	$928,200	278	19	$1,900,000
132	December 4	Bellagio High Roller #3	$10,000	No-Limit Hold'em	Bellagio Las Vegas	Las Vegas	(South Korea) Sung Joo Hyun (1)	$140,000	140	35	$350,000
133	December 5	Bellagio High Roller #4	$10,000	8-Game	Bellagio Las Vegas	Las Vegas	(Denmark) Henrik Hecklen (1)	$102,600	103	19	$190,000
134	December 6	Bellagio High Roller #5	$10,000	No-Limit Hold'em	Bellagio Las Vegas	Las Vegas	(United States) Justin Bonomo (3)	$128,000	128	32	$320,000
135	December 7	Bellagio High Roller #6	$10,000	No-Limit Hold'em	Bellagio Las Vegas	Las Vegas	(Germany) Leonard Maue (2)	$146,200	146	43	$430,000
136	December 8	Bellagio High Roller #7	$10,000	No-Limit Hold'em	Bellagio Las Vegas	Las Vegas	(United States) Anuj Agarwal (2)	$156,400	156	46	$460,000
137	December 9	Bellagio High Roller #8	$10,000	Pot-Limit Omaha	Bellagio Las Vegas	Las Vegas	(Brazil) Felipe Ramos (1)	$115,500	116	35	$350,000
138	December 10	Bellagio High Roller #9	$25,000	No-Limit Hold'em	Bellagio Las Vegas	Las Vegas	(Slovenia) Rok Gostisa (2)	$283,500	170	21	$525,000
139	December 11	Bellagio High Roller #10	$25,000	No-Limit Hold'em	Bellagio Las Vegas	Las Vegas	(France) Arthur Conan (2)	$227,500	137	13	$325,000
140	December 12	Bellagio High Roller #11	$10,000	No-Limit Hold'em	Bellagio Las Vegas	Las Vegas	(United States) Nick Petrangelo (3)	$151,200	151	42	$420,000
141	December 13	Bellagio High Roller #12	$25,000	No-Limit Hold'em	Bellagio Las Vegas	Las Vegas	(Turkey) Selahaddin Bedir (2)	$287,500	173	25	$625,000
142	December 14	Bellagio High Roller #13	$25,000	No-Limit Hold'em	Bellagio Las Vegas	Las Vegas	(United States) Andrew Lichtenberger (3)	$432,000	259	54	$1,350,000
143	December 15	WPT Five Diamond	$10,000	No-Limit Hold'em	Bellagio Las Vegas	Las Vegas	(United States) Taylor Black (1)	$1,241,430	1,200	716	$6,945,200
144	December 19	Bellagio High Roller #14	$25,000	No-Limit Hold'em	Bellagio Las Vegas	Las Vegas	(France) Johan Guilbert (2)	$175,000	105	7	$175,000
145	December 20	PokerGO Tour Championship	$50,000	No-Limit Hold'em	ARIA Resort & Casino	Las Vegas	(Slovenia) Rok Gostisa (3)	$689,100	413	46	$2,300,000
