= PokerGO Tour =

American high buy-in poker tour, founded 2021

- Current season, competition or edition: 2026 PokerGO Tour
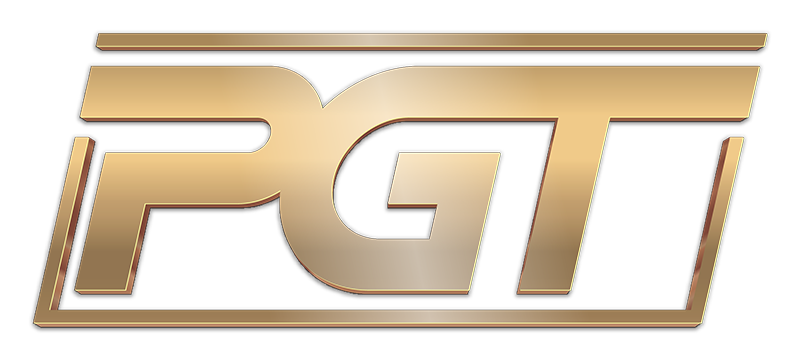
- Sport: Poker
- Founded: April 22, 2021
- Most recent champion: (United States) Alex Foxen
- Most titles: (United States) Sam Soverel (13)
- Website: PGT.com

The PokerGO Tour (PGT) is the official tour and ranking system for professional poker players that play in high roller poker tournaments with a minimum $5,000 buy-in. The PGT awards points to poker players based on prize money won in approximately 150 tournaments around the globe. The player who accumulates the most points during the year is crowned PGT Player of the Year. A predetermined cutoff point of the top point earners each year determines who will compete in a season ending event, with the winner of that event crowned PGT Champion.

== History ==
Launched in April, 2021, the PokerGO Tour was created for poker players that played in high roller poker tournaments around the world. The top three finishers would share in $175,000 in prize money, and when residential mortgage company Guaranteed Rate was announced as the presenting sponsor in September, the prize money was increased to $350,000, awarded as: $200,000 and the Guaranteed Rate Cup for the points leader, $100,000 for second place, and $50,000 for third place.

Following the conclusion of all qualifying PokerGO Tour tournaments for the 2022 season, the top 21 players on the PokerGO Tour leaderboard were to be invited to play in the season-ending PGT Championship. Players were to receive starting chips based on how many points they earned during the season, and the PGT Championship was to be a winner-take-all where the winner would collect the $500,000 first-place prize.

Following the conclusion of all qualifying PokerGO Tour tournaments for the 2023 season, the top 40 players on the PokerGO Tour leaderboard and select "Dream Seat" winners were to be invited to play in the season-ending PGT Championship. All players were to receive starting chips based on how many points they earned during the season, with the minimum set at 100 big blinds. The PGT Championship was to be a $1,000,000 freeroll with a $500,000 first-place prize.

== Points system ==
The PokerGO Tour calculates all cashes that are less than $1,000,000 in prize money by using three percentages based on buy-in amounts; 0.0010% for $5,000 to $24,999 buy-in events, 0.0006% for $25,000 to $99,999 buy-in events, and 0.0003% for $100,000+ buy-in events. For cashes more than $1,000,000 in prize money, the following points table is used for cashes that fall within structured segments.

PokerGO Tour Points System
Cash	$10,000 - $24,999	$25,000 - $99,999	$100,000+
$5,000,000 - $5,999,999	1,600	1,100	800
$4,000,000 - $4,999,999	1,500	1,000	700
$3,000,000 - $3,999,999	1,400	900	600
$2,500,000 - $2,999,999	1,350	850	550
$2,000,000 - $2,499,999	1,300	800	500
$1,500,000 - $1,999,999	1,250	750	450
$1,000,000 - $1,499,999	1,200	700	400
< $1,000,000	0.0010%	0.0006%	0.0003%

== Seasons and champions ==
Each year, players compete throughout the entire year in poker tournaments and are ranked by the PGT leaderboard. Each PGT season, there is a season-ending event called the PGT Championship.

In 2021, Ali Imsirovic was crowned the 2021 PGT champion ahead of Michael Addamo and Sean Perry.

In 2022, Stephen Chidwick finished as the 2022 PGT Player of the Year, while Jason Koon won the PGT Championship.

In 2023, Isaac Haxton finished as the 2023 PGT Player of the Year, while Daniel Smiljkovic won the PGT Championship.

In 2024, Jeremy Ausmus was crowned the 2024 PGT Player of the Year and won the PGT $1,000,000 Championship.

In 2025, Alex Foxen was crowned the 2025 PGT Player of the Year, while Chad Eveslage won the PGT $1,000,000 Championship.

Season	Events	PGT Champion	Most wins	Most cashes	Highest earnings
2021	145	(Bosnia and Herzegovina) Ali Imsirovic	(Bosnia and Herzegovina) Ali Imsirovic (14)	(Bosnia and Herzegovina) Ali Imsirovic (34)	(Australia) Michael Addamo ($9,418,837)
2022	175	(United States) Jason Koon	(United Kingdom) Stephen Chidwick (6)	(United Kingdom) Stephen Chidwick (32)	(Norway) Espen Jørstad ($10,217,955)
2023	133	(Germany) Daniel Smiljkovic	(United States) Isaac Haxton (4) (United States) Isaac Kempton (4)	(Canada) Daniel Negreanu (25) (United States) Jason Koon (25)	(United States) Daniel Weinman ($12,180,000)
2024	132	(United States) Jeremy Ausmus	(United States) David Coleman (4) (United States) Dylan Weisman (4)	(United States) Jeremy Ausmus (27)	(United States) Jonathan Tamayo ($10,226,400)
2025	147	(United States) Alex Foxen	(United States) Alex Foxen (5) (United States) Chino Rheem (5)	(United States) Chino Rheem (35)	(United States) Michael Mizrachi ($11,391,322)

== PGT majors ==
There are currently four PGT majors, three of which (PokerGO Cup, Poker Masters, U.S. Poker Open) include multiple events through the year to determine the overall winner of that major. They exception is the Super High Roller Bowl, a single event major.

=== PokerGO Cup ===
Season	Events	Cup winner	Tournament winnings	Runner-up
2021	8	(Canada) Daniel Negreanu	$1,016,200	(Bosnia and Herzegovina) Ali Imsirovic
2022	8	(United States) Jeremy Ausmus	$824,500	(United States) Sean Perry
2023	8	(United States) Cary Katz	$655,800	(United States) Anthony Hu
2024	8	(United States) Jonathan Little	$730,350	(United States) David Peters
2025	8	(United States) Joey Weissman	$930,600	(United States) Eric Blair

=== Poker Masters ===
Season	Events	Purple Jacket winner	Total winnings	Runner-up
2021	12	(Australia) Michael Addamo	$1,840,000	(United States) Nick Petrangelo
2022	10	(United States) Sean Winter	$777,000	(United States) Jason Koon
2023	10	(United Kingdom) Stephen Chidwick	$1,109,000	(Lithuania) Vladas Tamasauskas
2024	8	(United States) Jim Collopy	$521,600	(United States) Isaac Haxton
2025	10	(United States) David Coleman	$657,700	(United States) Alex Foxen

The Poker Masters was first held in 2017. It was first included in the PGT in 2021 as the PGT launched for that year.

=== U.S. Poker Open ===
Season	Events	Golden Eagle winner	Total winnings	Runner-up
2021	12	(United States) David Peters	$832,950	(United States) Sean Winter
2022	12	(United States) Sean Winter	$1,196,000	(Japan) Tamon Nakamura
2023	10	(United States) Martin Zamani	$835,800	(China) Ren Lin
2024	8	(United States) Aram Zobian	$613,540	(United Kingdom) Stephen Chidwick
2025	8	(United States) Shannon Shorr	$749,650	(United States) Matthew Wantman

The U.S. Poker Open was first held in 2018. It was first included in the PGT in 2021 as the PGT launched for that year.

=== Super High Roller Bowl ===
Season	Events	Championship ring winner	Total winnings	Runner-up
Super High Roller Bowl VI	1	(Australia) Michael Addamo	$3,402,000	(United States) Justin Bonomo
Super High Roller Bowl VII	1	(Canada) Daniel Negreanu	$3,312,000	(United States) Nick Petrangelo
Super High Roller Bowl VIII	1	(United States) Isaac Haxton	$2,760,000	(United States) Andrew Lichtenberger
Super High Roller Bowl: PLO	1	(United States) Jared Bleznick	$1,292,000	(United States) Isaac Haxton
Super High Roller Bowl IX	1	(United States) Seth Davies	$3,206,000	(Spain) Juan Pardo
Super High Roller Bowl: PLO	1	(United States) Seth Davies	$1,500,000	(United States) Artem Maksimov
Super High Roller Bowl: Mixed Games	1	(United States) Chad Eveslage	$1,200,000	(United States) Michael Moncek
Super High Roller Bowl: PLO	1	(United States) John Riordan	$1,250,000	(United States) Sam Soverel
Super High Roller Bowl X	1	(Brazil) Joao Simao	$1,100,000	(United States) Jason Koon

The Super High Roller Bowl was first held in 2015. It was first included in the PGT in 2021 as the PGT launched for that year.

== Player stats ==
=== Top 10 all-time money list ===
Information correct as of January 19, 2026.

Rank	Player	PGT winnings
1st	(United States) Alex Foxen	$19,312,013
2nd	(United States) Seth Davies	$19,034,295
3rd	(United Kingdom) Stephen Chidwick	$17,408,044
4th	(United States) Jason Koon	$15,893,482
5th	(United States) Chris Brewer	$14,593,779
6th	(United States) Jeremy Ausmus	$14,422,191
7th	(Canada) Daniel Negreanu	$14,216,255
8th	(United States) Isaac Haxton	$14,204,043
9th	(United States) Sam Soverel	$13,827,006
10th	(United States) Sean Winter	$12,969,185

=== Top 10 most tournament wins ===
Information correct as of January 19, 2026.

Rank	Player	Total PGT wins	PokerGO Cup	Poker Masters	U.S. Poker Open	Super High Roller Bowl	Other
1st	(United States) Sam Soverel	13			2		11
T-2nd	(United States) Alex Foxen	12	2	2	2		6
T-2nd	(United Kingdom) Stephen Chidwick	12		2	1		9
4th	(Canada) Daniel Negreanu	11	2	1		1	7
T-5th	(United States) Jeremy Ausmus	8	1	1	1		5
T-5th	(United States) Chris Brewer	8		1			7
T-5th	(United States) Chino Rheem	8		2	1		5
T-5th	(United States) Sean Perry	8	2	1			5
T-5th	(United States) Justin Bonomo	8		1			7
T-5th	(Australia) Michael Addamo	8		3		1	4

=== Top 10 most cashes ===
Information correct as of January 19, 2026.

Rank	Player	PGT cashes
1st	(United States) Alex Foxen	108
2nd	(United States) Sam Soverel	107
3rd	(United States) Jeremy Ausmus	105
4th	(United States) Sean Winter	100
T-5th	(United Kingdom) Stephen Chidwick	99
T-5th	(Canada) Daniel Negreanu	99
7th	(United States) Nick Schulman	92
8th	(United States) Cary Katz	88
9th	(United States) Chris Brewer	78
10th	(United States) John Riordan	70
