= 2021 PokerGO Cup =

Series of poker tournaments

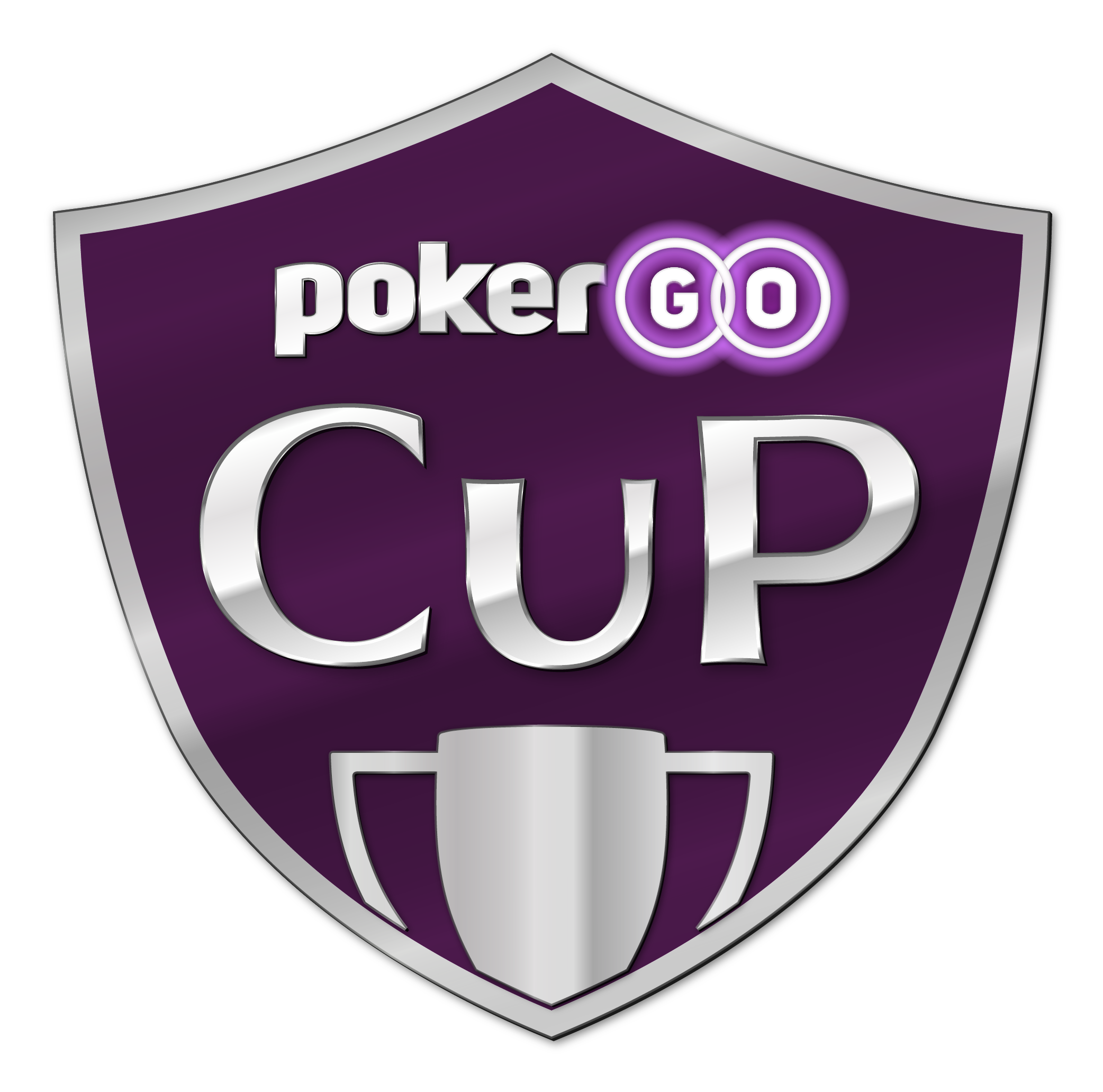
- Venue: PokerGO Studio at Aria Resort and Casino
- Location: Las Vegas, Nevada
- Dates: July 6–14, 2021

Champion
- (Canada) Daniel Negreanu (PokerGO Cup winner); (United States) Cary Katz (Main Event winner)

The 2021 PokerGO Cup was the inaugural PokerGO Cup, a series of high-stakes poker tournaments as part of the PokerGO Tour. It was held from inside the PokerGO Studio at Aria Resort & Casino in Las Vegas, Nevada. The series took place from July 6–14, 2021, with eight scheduled events culminating in a $100,000 No-Limit Hold'em tournament. Each final table was streamed on PokerGO.

The player who earns the most points throughout the series would be crowned the PokerGO Cup champion earning $50,000 and the PokerGO Cup.

The Main Event was won by American Cary Katz, and the PokerGO Cup was awarded to Canadian Daniel Negreanu.

== Schedule ==
#	Event	Entrants	Winner	Prize	Winning hand	Runner-up	Losing hand	Results
1	$10,000 No-Limit Hold'em	66	(United States) Alex Foxen	$178,200	9♥ 9♦	(United States) Sean Perry	10♦ 8♥	Results
2	$10,000 No-Limit Hold'em	61	(Bosnia and Herzegovina) Ali Imsirovic	$183,000	K♠ 2♦	(United States) Jason Koon	A♣ 9♦	Results
3	$10,000 No-Limit Hold'em	53	(United States) Dylan Linde	$169,600	A♣ 10♣	(United States) Sam Soverel	A♦ 3♣	Results
4	$15,000 No-Limit Hold'em	50	(Bosnia and Herzegovina) Ali Imsirovic	$240,000	5♠ 5♦	(Canada) Daniel Weinand	8♣ 3♣	Results
5	$25,000 No-Limit Hold'em	36	(United States) Jake Schindler	$324,000	Q♦ J♦	(United States) David Peters	6♠ 6♦	Results
6	$25,000 No-Limit Hold'em	36	(United States) Jason Koon	$324,000	9♥ 9♦	(United States) Thomas Winters	Kc6♣	Results
7	$50,000 No-Limit Hold'em	35	(Canada) Daniel Negreanu	$700,000	K♣ 10♦	(United States) David Coleman	5♥ 5♦	Results
8	$100,000 No-Limit Hold'em	23	(United States) Cary Katz	$1,058,000	Q♦ 4♣	(United States) Sam Soverel	10♦ 9♣	Results

== Series leaderboard ==
The 2021 PokerGO Cup awarded the PokerGO Cup to the player that accumulated the most PokerGO Tour points during the series. Canadian Daniel Negreanu won one event and cashed four times on his way to accumulating $996,200 in winnings. Negreanu accumulated 537 points and was awarded the PokerGO Cup.

Standings
Rank	Name	Points	Earnings
1	(Canada) Daniel Negreanu	537	$996,200
2	(Bosnia and Herzegovina) Ali Imsirovic	497	$545,500
3	(United States) Cary Katz	475	$1,161,800
4	(United States) David Coleman	470	$710,000
5	(United States) Alex Foxen	421	$533,200
6	(United States) Sam Soverel	361	$812,200
7	(United States) Jason Koon	316	$446,000
8	(United States) Dylan Linde	255	$255,000
9	(Spain) Sergi Reixach	244	$320,700
10	(United States) Jake Schindler	194	$324,000

== Results ==
=== Event #1: $10,000 No-Limit Hold'em ===
- 2-Day Event: July 6–7
- Number of Entries: 66
- Total Prize Pool: $660,000
- Number of Payouts: 10
- Winning Hand: 9♥ 9♦

Final Table
Place	Name	Prize
1st	(United States) Alex Foxen	$178,200
2nd	(United States) Sean Perry	$132,000
3rd	(Spain) Sergi Reixach	$85,800
4th	(United States) David Coleman	$66,000
5th	(United States) Jordan Cristos	$52,800
6th	(United States) Kristina Holst	$39,600
7th	(Canada) Vanessa Kade	$33,000
8th	(United States) Steve Zolotow	$26,400
9th	(United States) Sam Soverel	$26,400
10th	(United States) David Peters	$19,800

=== Event #2: $10,000 No-Limit Hold'em ===
- 2-Day Event: July 7–8
- Number of Entries: 61
- Total Prize Pool: $610,000
- Number of Payouts: 9
- Winning Hand: K♠ 2♦

Final Table
Place	Name	Prize
1st	(Bosnia and Herzegovina) Ali Imsirovic	$183,000
2nd	(United States) Jason Koon	$122,000
3rd	(United States) Dylan Linde	$85,400
4th	(United States) Mo Rahim	$61,000
5th	(United States) Frank Funaro	$48,800
6th	(Lithuania) Matas Cimbolas	$36,600
7th	(United States) Sam Soverel	$30,500
8th	(Canada) Daniel Weinand	$24,400
9th	(Germany) Marius Gierse	$18,300

=== Event #3: $10,000 No-Limit Hold'em ===
- 2-Day Event: July 8–9
- Number of Entries: 53
- Total Prize Pool: $530,000
- Number of Payouts: 8
- Winning Hand: A♣ 10♣

Final Table
Place	Name	Prize
1st	(United States) Dylan Linde	$169,600
2nd	(United States) Sam Soverel	$111,300
3rd	(United States) Steve Zolotow	$74,200
4th	(United States) Bill Klein	$53,000
5th	(Spain) Sergi Reixach	$42,400
6th	(United States) Cary Katz	$31,800
7th	(United States) Chris Brewer	$26,500
8th	(Canada) Daniel Negreanu	$21,200

=== Event #4: $15,000 No-Limit Hold'em ===
- 2-Day Event: July 9–10
- Number of Entries: 50
- Total Prize Pool: $750,000
- Number of Payouts: 8
- Winning Hand: 5♠ 5♦

Final Table
Place	Name	Prize
1st	(Bosnia and Herzegovina) Ali Imsirovic	$240,000
2nd	(Canada) Daniel Weinand	$157,500
3rd	(United States) Jordan Cristos	$105,000
4th	(United States) Alex Foxen	$75,000
5th	(United States) Mo Rahim	$60,000
6th	(United States) David Coleman	$45,000
7th	(United States) Eric Worre	$37,500
8th	(England) Stephen Chidwick	$30,000

=== Event #5: $25,000 No-Limit Hold'em ===
- 2-Day Event: July 10–11
- Number of Entries: 36
- Total Prize Pool: $900,000
- Number of Payouts: 6
- Winning Hand: Q♦ J♦

Final Table
Place	Name	Prize
1st	(United States) Jake Schindler	$324,000
2nd	(United States) David Peters	$216,000
3rd	(United States) David Coleman	$144,000
4th	(England) Stephen Chidwick	$99,000
5th	(United States) Sean Winter	$72,000
6th	(Canada) Daniel Negreanu	$45,000

=== Event #6: $25,000 No-Limit Hold'em ===
- 2-Day Event: July 11–12
- Number of Entries: 36
- Total Prize Pool: $900,000
- Number of Payouts: 6
- Winning Hand: 9♥ 9♦

Final Table
Place	Name	Prize
1st	(United States) Jason Koon	$324,000
2nd	(United States) Thomas Winters	$216,000
3rd	(United States) John Riordan	$144,000
4th	(United States) Anuj Agarwal	$99,000
5th	(United States) Cary Katz	$72,000
6th	(United States) Steve Zolotow	$45,000

=== Event #7: $50,000 No-Limit Hold'em ===
- 2-Day Event: July 12–13
- Number of Entries: 35
- Total Prize Pool: $1,750,000
- Number of Payouts: 5
- Winning Hand: K♣ 10♦

Final Table
Place	Name	Prize
1st	(Canada) Daniel Negreanu	$720,000
2nd	(United States) David Coleman	$455,000
3rd	(United States) Alex Foxen	$280,000
4th	(Spain) Sergi Reixach	$192,500
5th	(Bosnia and Herzegovina) Ali Imsirovic	$122,500

=== Event #8: $100,000 No-Limit Hold'em ===
- 2-Day Event: July 13–14
- Number of Entries: 23
- Total Prize Pool: $2,300,000
- Number of Payouts: 4
- Winning Hand: Q♦ 4♣

Final Table
Place	Name	Prize
1st	(United States) Cary Katz	$1,058,000
2nd	(United States) Sam Soverel	$644,000
3rd	(United States) Sean Winter	$368,000
4th	(Canada) Daniel Negreanu	$230,000
