= 2022 U.S. Poker Open =

Series of poker tournaments

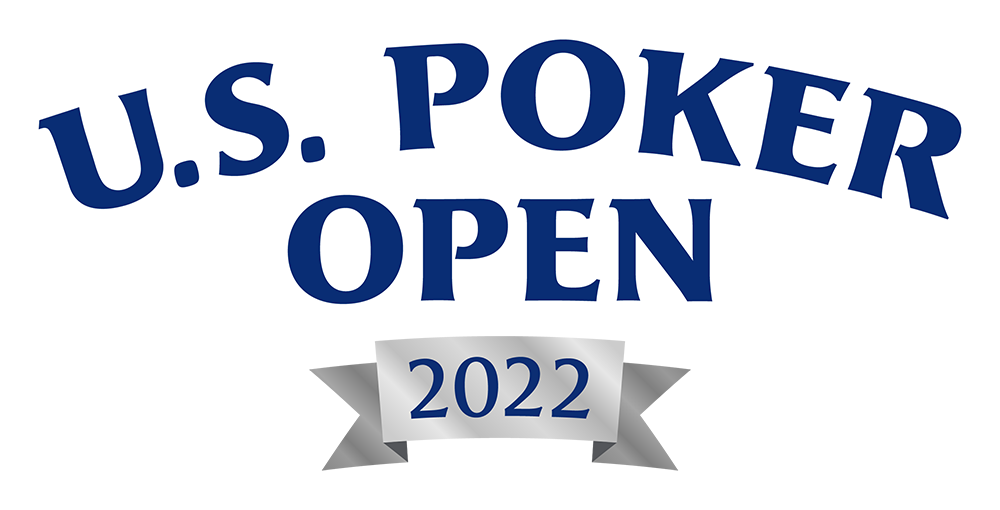
- Venue: PokerGO Studio at Aria Resort and Casino
- Location: Las Vegas, Nevada
- Dates: March 16–28, 2022

Champion
- Sean Winter (USPO Champion); Sean Winter (Main Event winner)

The 2022 U.S. Poker Open was the fourth edition of the U.S. Poker Open, a series of high-stakes poker tournaments held at ARIA Resort & Casino in Las Vegas, Nevada. The series ran from March 16–28, with 12 scheduled events culminating in the $50,000 No-Limit Hold'em tournament finale.

Sean Winter, runner-up in the previous two U.S. Poker Opens, won the last two events to earn the $50,000 championship and Golden Eagle trophy.

Final tables were streamed on PokerGO.

== Schedule ==
#	Event	Entrants	Winner	Prize	Winning hand	Runner-up	Losing hand	Results
1	$10,000 No-Limit Hold'em	93	(United States) Shannon Shorr	$213,900	A♦ K♦	(China) Ren Lin	K♥ J♥	Results
2	$10,000 Pot-Limit Omaha	77	(United States) Justin Young	$200,200	A♣ Q♥ J♥ 5♠	(United States) Tommy Le	J♠ J♣ 7♦ 3♠	Results
3	$10,000 No-Limit Hold'em	88	(United States) Adam Hendrix	$211,200	8♥ 8♠	(United States) Jonathan Little	A♣ 2♦	Results
4	$10,000 Big Bet Mix	53	(Japan) Tamon Nakamura	$169,600	9♣ 5♠	(Slovenia) Rok Gostisa	10♥ 7♦	Results
5	$10,000 No-Limit Hold'em	66	(United States) Jeremy Ausmus	$178,200	10♦ 10♣	(United States) Chris Brewer	A♦ Q♠	Results
6	$15,000 8-Game	47	(Japan) Tamon Nakamura	$239,700	A♣ 3♣	(United States) Phil Hellmuth	K♠ 7♣	Results
7	$15,000 No-Limit Hold'em	70	(United States) Alex Foxen	$283,500	8♦ 8♣	(United States) David Rheem	10♠ 7♠	Results
8	$15,000 Pot-Limit Omaha	67	(United States) David Rheem	$271,350	K♠ 9♦ 9♣ 3♦	(United States) Scott Seiver	K♣ J♣ 10♦ 6♠	Results
9	$25,000 No-Limit Hold'em	63	(United States) Erik Seidel	$472,500	Q♣ J♠	(United States) Phil Hellmuth	J♣ 9♥	Results
10	$25,000 Pot-Limit Omaha	49	(United States) Dylan Weisman	$416,500	A♣ 8♣ 5♥ 5♦	(United States) Cary Katz	Q♦ J♠ 3♠ 3♦	Results
11	$25,000 No-Limit Hold'em	55	(United States) Sean Winter	$440,000	Q♥ J♥	(Bosnia and Herzegovina) Ali Imsirovic	10♣ 8♥	Results
12	$50,000 No-Limit Hold'em	42	(United States) Sean Winter	$756,000	A♠ 6♣	(Japan) Masashi Oya	Q♠ Q♣	Results

== Series leaderboard ==
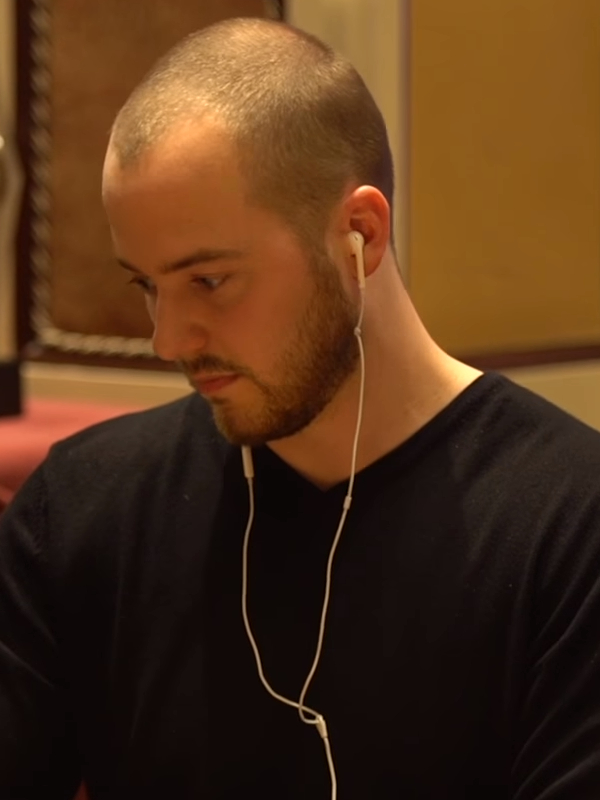
Series champion Sean Winter

Final Standings
Rank	Name	Points	Earnings	Wins	Cashes
1	(United States) Sean Winter	718	$1,196,000	2	2
2	(Japan) Tamon Nakamura	588	$669,400	2	6
3	(United States) Alex Foxen	488	$576,600	1	4
4	(United States) David Rheem	481	$481,350	1	2
5	(United States) Phil Hellmuth	464	$589,200	0	4

== Series Stats ==
Cashes
Rank	Name	Cashes
1	(Japan) Tamon Nakamura	6
2	(United States) Jeremy Ausmus	4
2	(United States) Alex Foxen	4
2	(United States) Phil Hellmuth	4
2	(United States) Adam Hendrix	4
2	(Canada) Alex Livingston	4
2	(United States) Shannon Shorr	4
2	(United States) Dylan Weisman	4

Final Tables
Rank	Name	Final Tables
1	(Japan) Tamon Nakamura	4
1	(United States) Dylan Weisman	4
3	(United Kingdom) Stephen Chidwick	3
3	(United States) Alex Foxen	3
3	(United States) Phil Hellmuth	3
3	(Bosnia and Herzegovina) Ali Imsirovic	3
3	(China) Ren Lin	3
3	(United States) Erik Seidel	3
3	(United States) Shannon Shorr	3

== Results ==
=== Event #1: $10,000 No-Limit Hold'em ===
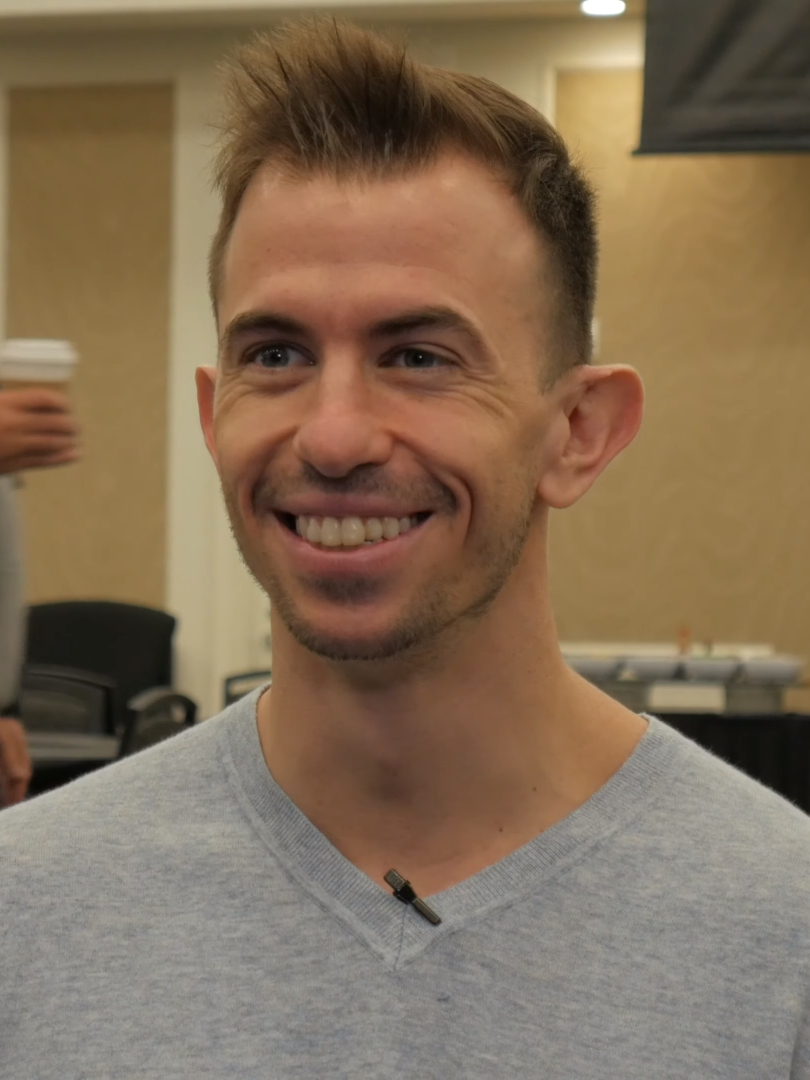
Shannon Shorr won Event #1

- 2-Day Event: March 16–17
- Number of Entries: 93
- Total Prize Pool: $930,000
- Number of Payouts: 14
- Winning Hand: A♦ K♦

Final Table
Place	Name	Prize
1st	(United States) Shannon Shorr	$213,900
2nd	(China) Ren Lin	$148,800
3rd	(Japan) Masashi Oya	$111,600
4th	(Canada) Daniel Negreanu	$93,000
5th	(United States) Erik Seidel	$74,400
6th	(United States) Joseph Cheong	$55,800

=== Event #2: $10,000 Pot-Limit Omaha ===
- 2-Day Event: March 17–18
- Number of Entries: 77
- Total Prize Pool: $770,000
- Number of Payouts: 11
- Winning Hand: A♣ Q♥ J♥ 5♠

Final Table
Place	Name	Prize
1st	(United States) Justin Young	$200,200
2nd	(United States) Tommy Le	$146,300
3rd	(United States) Dan Shak	$100,100
4th	(United States) Damjan Radanov	$77,000
5th	(United States) Dylan Weisman	$61,600
6th	(United States) Alex Foxen	$46,200

=== Event #3: $10,000 No-Limit Hold'em ===
- 2-Day Event: March 18–19
- Number of Entries: 88
- Total Prize Pool: $880,000
- Number of Payouts: 13
- Winning Hand: 8♥ 8♠

Final Table
Place	Name	Prize
1st	(United States) Adam Hendrix	$211,200
2nd	(United States) Jonathan Little	$149,600
3rd	(United States) Jeremy Ausmus	$105,600
4th	(United States) Shannon Shorr	$88,000
5th	(United States) Erik Seidel	$70,400
6th	(United States) Nitis Udornpim	$52,800

=== Event #4: $10,000 Big Bet Mix ===
- 2-Day Event: March 19–20
- Number of Entries: 53
- Total Prize Pool: $530,000
- Number of Payouts: 8
- Winning Hand: 9♣ 5♠ (No-Limit Hold'em)

Final Table
Place	Name	Prize
1st	(Japan) Tamon Nakamura	$169,600
2nd	(Slovenia) Rok Gostisa	$111,300
3rd	(Canada) Daniel Negreanu	$74,200
4th	(United Kingdom) Stephen Chidwick	$53,000
5th	(United States) Dylan Weisman	$42,400
6th	(United States) John Riordan	$31,800

=== Event #5: $10,000 No-Limit Hold'em ===
- 2-Day Event: March 20–21
- Number of Entries: 66
- Total Prize Pool: $660,000
- Number of Payouts: 10
- Winning Hand: 10♦ 10♣

Final Table
Place	Name	Prize
1st	(United States) Jeremy Ausmus	$178,200
2nd	(United States) Chris Brewer	$132,000
3rd	(China) Ren Lin	$85,800
4th	(Bosnia and Herzegovina) Ali Imsirovic	$66,000
5th	(United States) Nick Petrangelo	$52,800
6th	(United States) David Peters	$39,600

=== Event #6: $15,000 8-Game ===
- 2-Day Event: March 21–22
- Number of Entries: 47
- Total Prize Pool: $705,000
- Number of Payouts: 7
- Winning Hand: A♣ 3♣ (Limit Hold'em)

Final Table
Place	Name	Prize
1st	(Japan) Tamon Nakamura	$239,700
2nd	(United States) Phil Hellmuth	$155,100
3rd	(United States) Ben Yu	$105,750
4th	(United States) Bryan Micon	$77,550
5th	(United States) Damjan Radanov	$56,400
6th	(United States) Scott Seiver	$42,300

=== Event #7: $15,000 No-Limit Hold'em ===
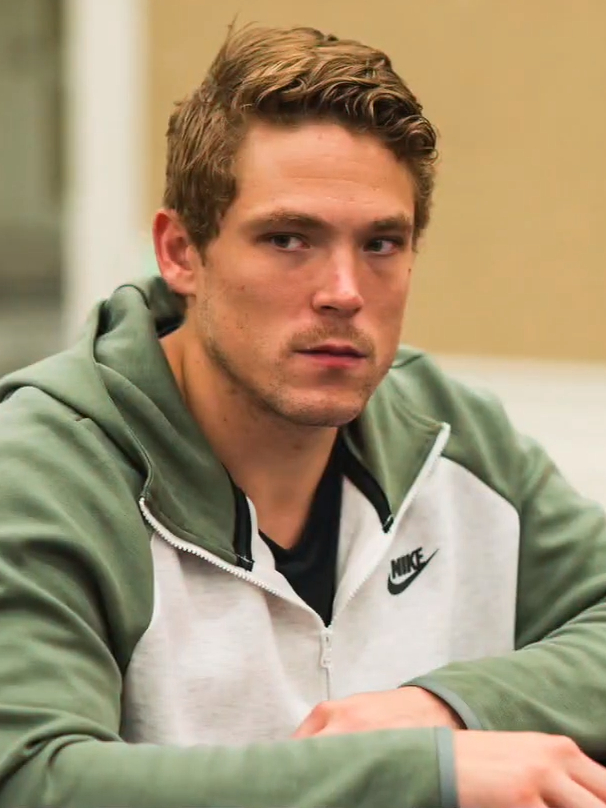
Alex Foxen won his first USPO title in Event #7

- 2-Day Event: March 22–23
- Number of Entries: 70
- Total Prize Pool: $1,050,000
- Number of Payouts: 10
- Winning Hand: 8♦ 8♣

Final Table
Place	Name	Prize
1st	(United States) Alex Foxen	$283,500
2nd	(United States) David Rheem	$210,000
3rd	(United Kingdom) Stephen Chidwick	$136,500
4th	(Belgium) Thomas Boivin	$105,000
5th	(United States) Joseph Cheong	$84,000
6th	(United States) Dan Smith	$63,000

=== Event #8: $15,000 Pot-Limit Omaha ===
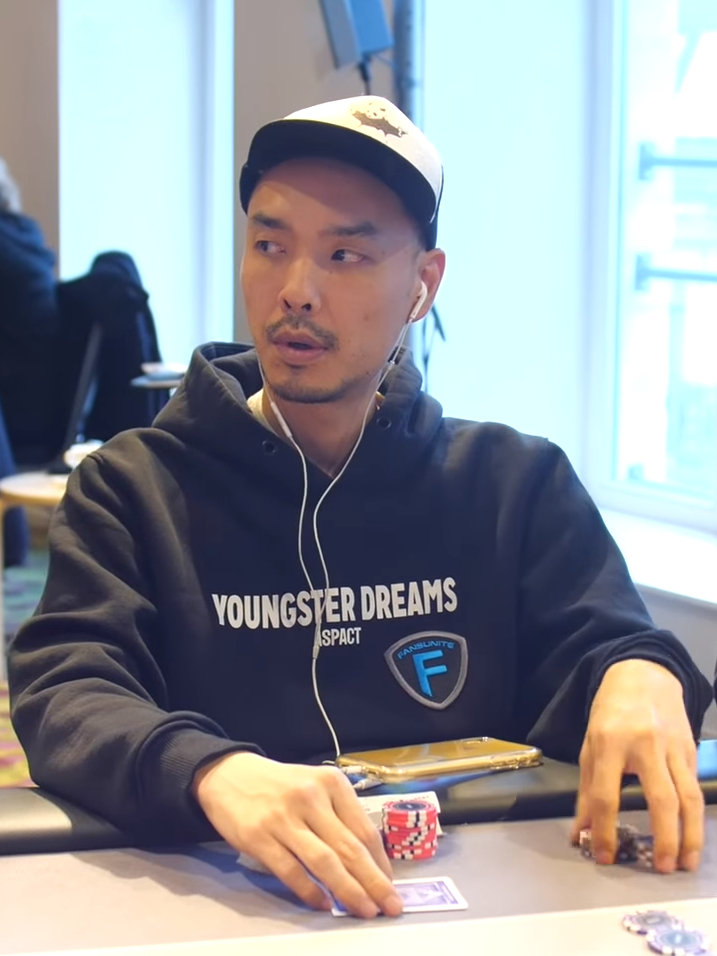
David "Chino" Rheem was runner-up in Event #7, then won Event #8 a day later

- 2-Day Event: March 23–24
- Number of Entries: 67
- Total Prize Pool: $1,005,000
- Number of Payouts: 10
- Winning Hand: K♠ 9♦ 9♣ 3♦

Final Table
Place	Name	Prize
1st	(United States) David Rheem	$271,350
2nd	(United States) Scott Seiver	$201,000
3rd	(United States) Isaac Kempton	$130,650
4th	(United States) Phil Hellmuth	$100,500
5th	(United States) Adam Hendrix	$80,400
6th	(United States) Dylan Weisman	$60,300

=== Event #9: $25,000 No-Limit Hold'em ===
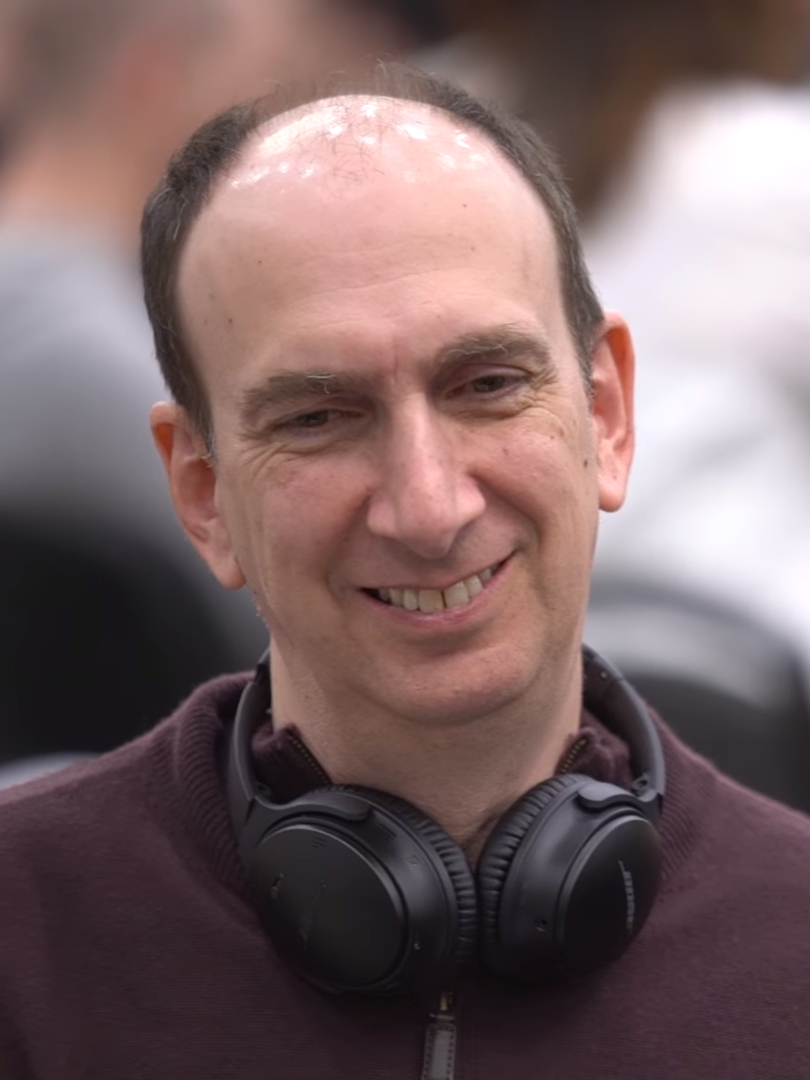
Hall of Famer Erik Seidel won Event #9

- 2-Day Event: March 24–25
- Number of Entries: 63
- Total Prize Pool: $1,575,000
- Number of Payouts: 9
- Winning Hand: Q♣ J♠

Final Table
Place	Name	Prize
1st	(United States) Erik Seidel	$472,500
2nd	(United States) Phil Hellmuth	$315,000
3rd	(United States) Alex Foxen	$220,500
4th	(United States) Sam Soverel	$157,500
5th	(Japan) Tamon Nakamura	$126,000
6th	(China) Ren Lin	$94,500

=== Event #10: $25,000 Pot-Limit Omaha ===
- 2-Day Event: March 25–26
- Number of Entries: 49
- Total Prize Pool: $1,225,000
- Number of Payouts: 7
- Winning Hand: A♣ 8♣ 5♥ 5♦

Final Table
Place	Name	Prize
1st	(United States) Dylan Weisman	$416,500
2nd	(United States) Cary Katz	$269,500
3rd	(Bosnia and Herzegovina) Ali Imsirovic	$183,750
4th	(United States) Matthew Wantman	$134,750
5th	(United Kingdom) Stephen Chidwick	$98,000
6th	(United States) Isaac Kempton	$73,500

=== Event #11: $25,000 No-Limit Hold'em ===
- 2-Day Event: March 26–27
- Number of Entries: 55
- Total Prize Pool: $1,375,000
- Number of Payouts: 8
- Winning Hand: Q♥ J♥

Final Table
Place	Name	Prize
1st	(United States) Sean Winter	$440,000
2nd	(Bosnia and Herzegovina) Ali Imsirovic	$288,750
3rd	(United States) Jake Schindler	$192,500
4th	(United States) Nick Schulman	$137,500
5th	(United States) David Peters	$110,000
6th	(Japan) Tamon Nakamura	$82,500

=== Event #12: $50,000 No-Limit Hold'em ===
- 2-Day Event: March 27–28
- Number of Entries: 42
- Total Prize Pool: $2,100,000
- Number of Payouts: 6
- Winning Hand: A♠ 6♣

Final Table
Place	Name	Prize
1st	(United States) Sean Winter	$756,000
2nd	(Japan) Masashi Oya	$504,000
3rd	(United States) Zhuang Ruan	$336,000
4th	(United States) Vikenty Shegal	$231,000
5th	(United States) Shannon Shorr	$168,000
6th	(United States) Dan Smith	$105,000
