= 2021 Poker Masters =

Series of poker tournaments

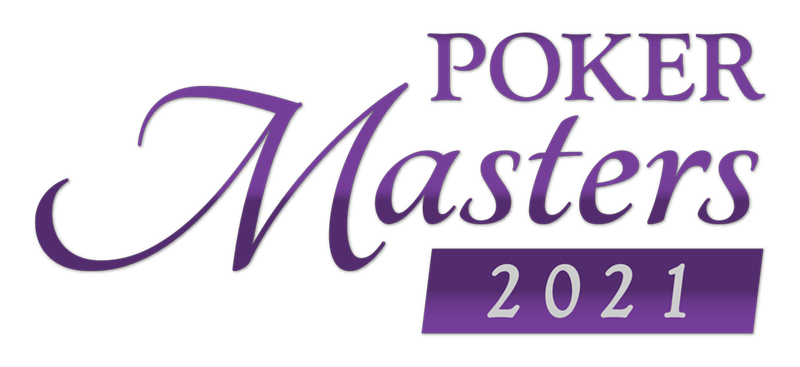
- Venue: PokerGO Studio at ARIA Resort & Casino
- Location: Las Vegas, Nevada
- Dates: September 7-19, 2021

Champion
- (Australia) Michael Addamo (Purple Jacket winner); (Australia) Michael Addamo (Main Event winner)

The 2021 Poker Masters was the sixth season of the Poker Masters. It took place from September 7-19, 2021, from the PokerGO Studio at ARIA Resort & Casino in Las Vegas, Nevada. There were 12 events on the schedule including nine No-Limit Hold'em, two Pot-Limit Omaha, and one 8-Game event. Buy-ins ranged from $10,000 to the $100,000 Main Event. Final tables were streamed on PokerGO.

Michael Addamo won the final two events, including the $100,000 Main Event, to earn the Purple Jacket as series champion.

== Schedule ==
The schedule for the 2021 Poker Masters included nine No-Limit Hold'em tournaments, two Pot-Limit Omaha tournaments, and an 8-Game event. 8-Game is a rotation of H.O.R.S.E., No-Limit Hold'em, Pot-Limit Omaha, and 2-7 Triple Draw.

2021 Poker Masters
#	Event	Entrants	Prize Pool (US$)	Winner	Winning Hand	Prize (US$)	Runner-up	Losing hand	Results
1	$10,000 No-Limit Hold'em	82	$820,000	(United States) Shannon Shorr	10♥ 8♣	$205,000	(United States) David Peters	6♠ 2♥	Results
2	$10,000 No-Limit Hold'em	86	$860,000	(United States) Sean Perry	K♦ J♣	$206,400	(United States) Jeremy Ausmus	Q♥ J♥	Results
3	$10,000 Pot-Limit Omaha	69	$690,000	(United States) Adam Hendrix	A♠ K♣ 7♠ 2♣	$186,300	(United States) Matthew Wantman	Q♥ 10♣ 8♥ 5♦	Results
4	$10,000 No-Limit Hold'em	73	$730,000	(United States) Brock Wilson	8♠ 7♣	$189,800	(United States) Elio Fox	8♣ 5♦	Results
5	$10,000 No-Limit Hold'em	66	$660,000	(Canada) Daniel Negreanu	A♠ A♦	$178,200	(United States) Nick Petrangelo	Q♠ 10♠	Results
6	$10,000 8-Game	30	$300,000	(United States) Maxx Coleman	2♥ A♣ Q♣ 9♦ 8♣ 3♦ 8♥	$120,000	(United States) Chad Eveslage	9♣ J♥ 8♠ 5♥ 4♥ 3♠ Q♠	Results
7	$10,000 No-Limit Hold'em	68	$680,000	(United Kingdom) Stephen Chidwick	K♦ K♣	$183,600	(United States) Dylan DeStefano	Q♥ 10♠	Results
8	$25,000 No-Limit Hold'em	57	$1,425,000	(United States) Chris Brewer	K♦ 9♣	$427,500	(United States) Darren Elias	10♣ 9♥	Results
9	$25,000 Pot-Limit Omaha	43	$1,075,000	(United States) Miles Rampel	J♣ 10♣ 2♠ 2♥	$365,500	(United States) Lou Garza	A♥ K♥ 8♦ 7♠	Results
10	$25,000 No-Limit Hold'em	38	$950,000	(Belarus) Mikita Badziakouski	Q♥ 10♠	$342,000	(United States) Seth Davies	J♠ 4♥	Results
11	$50,000 No-Limit Hold'em	34	$1,700,000	(Australia) Michael Addamo	K♦ J♥	$680,000	(United States) Jason Koon	K♣ 6♦	Results
12	$100,000 No-Limit Hold'em	29	$2,900,000	(Australia) Michael Addamo	7♥ 3♣	$1,160,000	(United States) Nick Petrangelo	K♣ 8♦	Results

== Purple Jacket standings ==
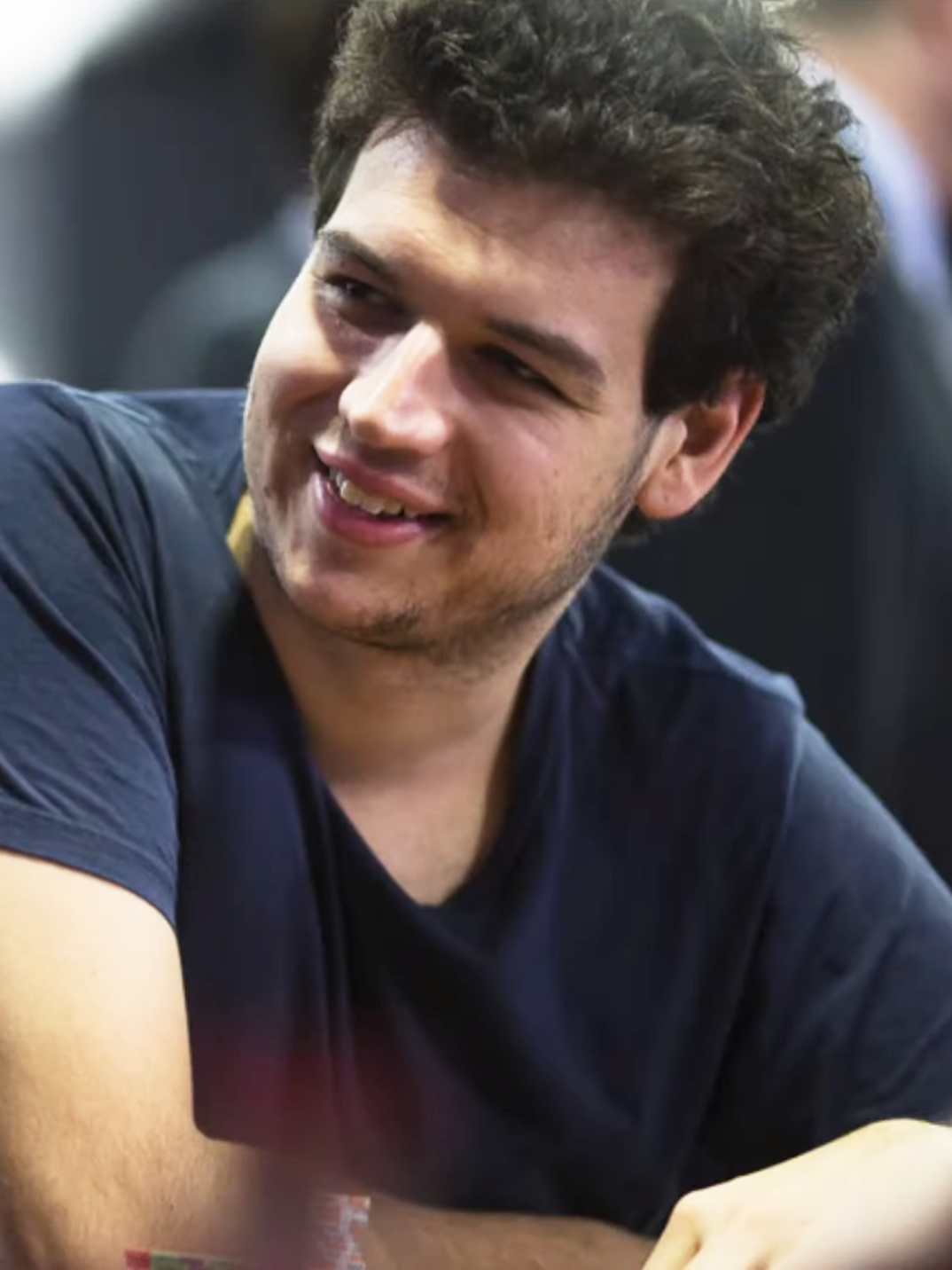
Michael Addamo won two events to earn the Purple Jacket

The 2021 Poker Masters awarded the Purple Jacket to the player that accumulated the most PokerGO Tour points during the series.

Poker Masters Purple Jacket Standings
Rank	Name	Points	Earnings
1	(Australia) Michael Addamo	808	$1,840,000
2	(United States) Nick Petrangelo	402	$929,800
3	(United States) Lou Garza	376	$550,200
4	(Canada) Daniel Negreanu	372	$433,400
5	(United States) Brock Wilson	358	$414,300

== Results ==
=== Event #1: $10,000 No-Limit Hold'em ===
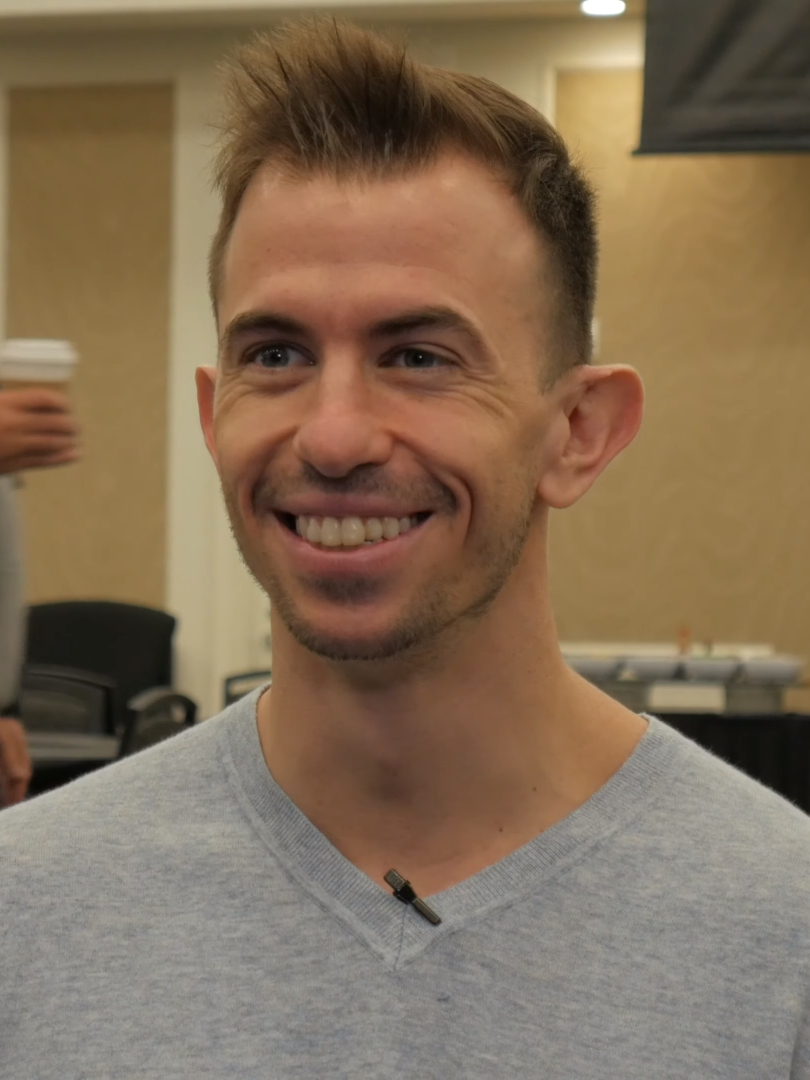
Event #1 champion Shannon Shorr

- 2-Day Event: September 7-8, 2021
- Number of Entrants: 82
- Total Prize Pool: $820,000
- Number of Payouts: 12
- Winning Hand: 10♥ 8♣

Final table
Place	Name	Prize
1st	(United States) Shannon Shorr	$205,000
2nd	(United States) David Peters	$147,600
3rd	(United States) Dylan DeStefano	$98,400
4th	(United States) Brock Wilson	$82,000
5th	(United States) Jonathan Jaffe	$65,600
6th	(United States) John Riordan	$49,200

=== Event #2: $10,000 No-Limit Hold'em ===
- 2-Day Event: September 8-9, 2021
- Number of Entrants: 86
- Total Prize Pool: $860,000
- Number of Payouts: 13
- Winning Hand: K♦ J♣

Final table
Place	Name	Prize
1st	(United States) Sean Perry	$206,400
2nd	(United States) Jeremy Ausmus	$146,200
3rd	(Canada) Daniel Negreanu	$103,200
4th	(United States) Jake Schindler	$86,000
5th	(United States) Sam Soverel	$68,800
6th	(United States) John Riordan	$51,600

=== Event #3: $10,000 Pot-Limit Omaha ===
- 2-Day Event: September 9-10, 2021
- Number of Entrants: 69
- Total Prize Pool: $690,000
- Number of Payouts: 10
- Winning Hand: A♠ K♣ 7♠ 2♣

Final table
Place	Name	Prize
1st	(United States) Adam Hendrix	$186,300
2nd	(United States) Matthew Wantman	$138,000
3rd	(United States) Jake Daniels	$89,700
4th	(United States) Brent Roberts	$69,000
5th	(United States) Jake Schindler	$55,200
6th	(United States) Chris Brewer	$41,400

=== Event #4: $10,000 No-Limit Hold'em ===
- 2-Day Event: September 10-11, 2021
- Number of Entrants: 73
- Total Prize Pool: $730,000
- Number of Payouts: 11
- Winning Hand: 8♠ 7♣

Final table
Place	Name	Prize
1st	(United States) Brock Wilson	$189,800
2nd	(United States) Elio Fox	$138,800
3rd	(United States) Brek Schutten	$94,900
4th	(United States) Chad Eveslage	$73,000
5th	(United States) Sam Soverel	$58,400
6th	(United States) Nick Petrangelo	$43,800

=== Event #5: $10,000 No-Limit Hold'em ===
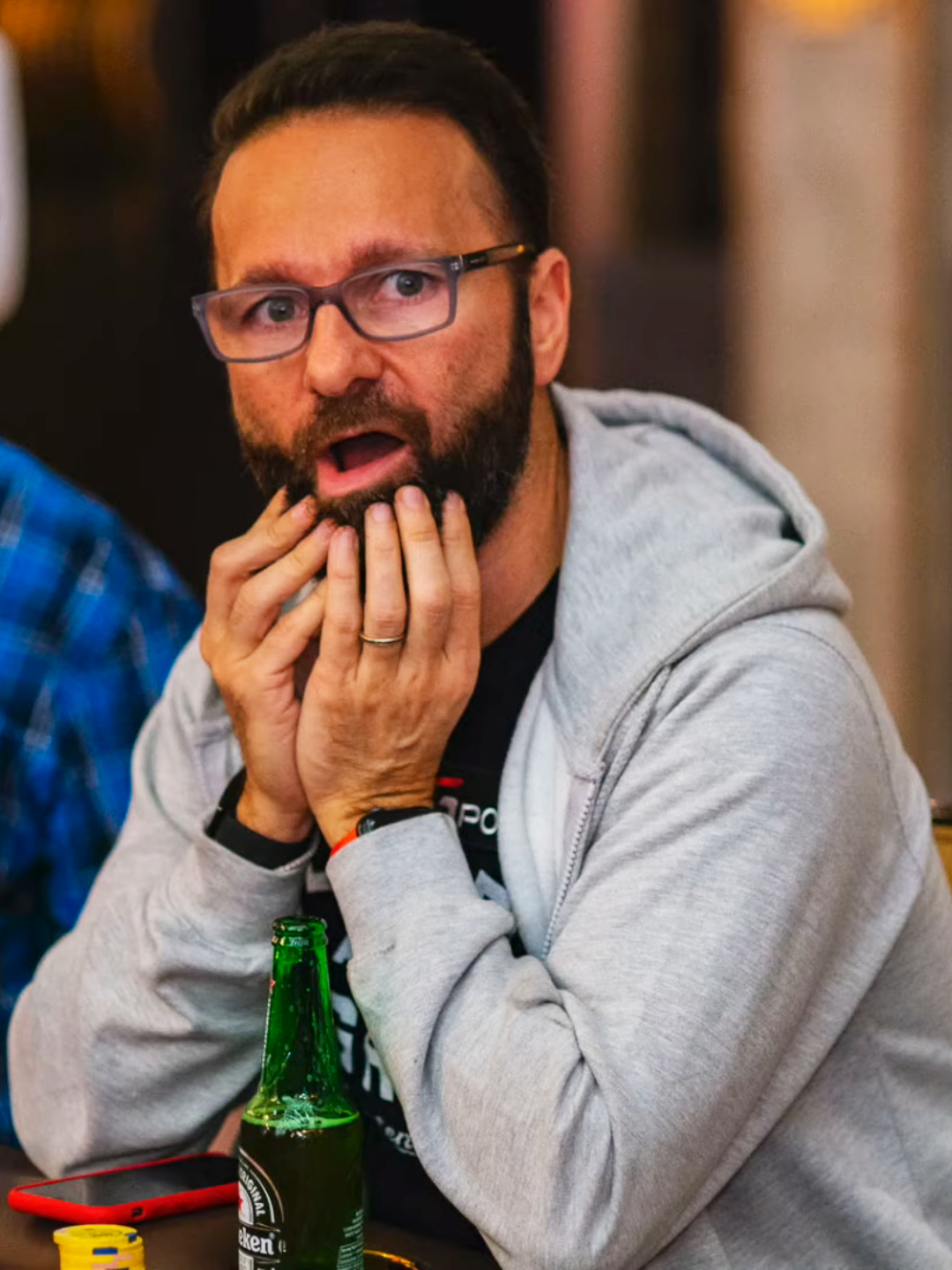
Hall of Famer Daniel Negreanu won Event #5

- 2-Day Event: September 11-12, 2021
- Number of Entrants: 66
- Total Prize Pool: $660,000
- Number of Payouts: 10
- Winning Hand: A♠ A♦

Final table
Place	Name	Prize
1st	(Canada) Daniel Negreanu	$178,200
2nd	(United States) Nick Petrangelo	$132,000
3rd	(United States) Vikenty Shegal	$85,800
4th	(United States) Jake Daniels	$66,000
5th	(United States) Jeffrey Trudeau	$52,800

=== Event #6: $10,000 8-Game ===
- 2-Day Event: September 12-13, 2021
- Number of Entrants: 30
- Total Prize Pool: $300,000
- Number of Payouts: 5
- Winning Hand: 2♥ A♣ Q♣ 9♦ 8♣ 3♦ 8♥ (Razz)

Final table
Place	Name	Prize
1st	(United States) Maxx Coleman	$120,000
2nd	(United States) Chad Eveslage	$78,000
3rd	(United Kingdom) Stephen Chidwick	$48,000
4th	(Sweden) Erik Sagstrom	$33,000
5th	(United States) Jeremy Ausmus	$21,000

=== Event #7: $10,000 No-Limit Hold'em ===
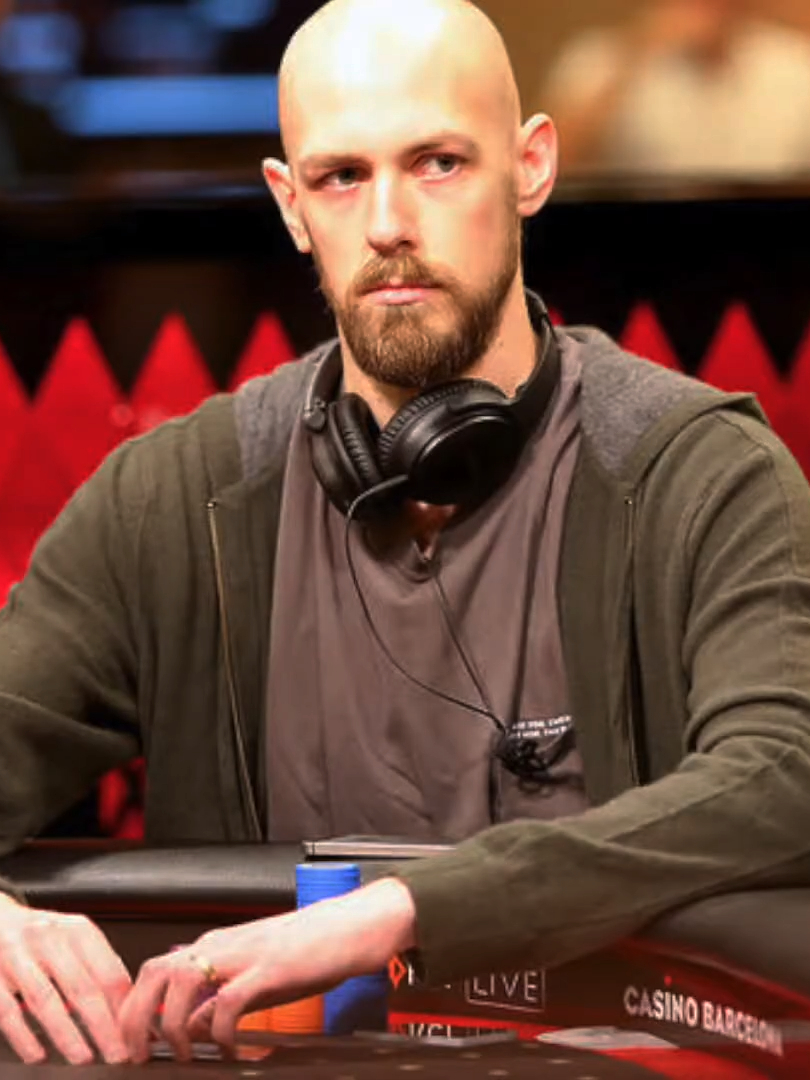
British pro Stephen Chidwick won Event #7

- 2-Day Event: September 13-14, 2021
- Number of Entrants: 68
- Total Prize Pool: $680,000
- Number of Payouts: 10
- Winning Hand: K♦ K♣

Final table
Place	Name	Prize
1st	(United Kingdom) Stephen Chidwick	$183,600
2nd	(United States) Dylan DeStefano	$136,000
3rd	(United States) Lou Garza	$88,400
4th	(United States) Brek Schutten	$68,000
5th	(United States) Dan Smith	$54,400

=== Event #8: $25,000 No-Limit Hold'em ===
- 2-Day Event: September 14-15, 2021
- Number of Entrants: 57
- Total Prize Pool: $1,425,000
- Number of Payouts: 9
- Winning Hand: K♦ 9♣

Final table
Place	Name	Prize
1st	(United States) Chris Brewer	$427,500
2nd	(United States) Darren Elias	$285,000
3rd	(United States) Lou Garza	$199,500
4th	(United States) Brock Wilson	$142,500
5th	(United States) John Riordan	$114,000

=== Event #9: $25,000 Pot-Limit Omaha ===
- 2-Day Event: September 15-16, 2021
- Number of Entrants: 43
- Total Prize Pool: $1,075,000
- Number of Payouts: 7
- Winning Hand: J♣ 10♣ 2♠ 2♥

Final table
Place	Name	Prize
1st	(United States) Miles Rampel	$365,500
2nd	(United States) Lou Garza	$236,500
3rd	(United States) Sean Winter	$161,250
4th	(United States) Ben Lamb	$118,250
5th	(United States) Jeremy Ausmus	$86,000

=== Event #10: $25,000 No-Limit Hold'em ===
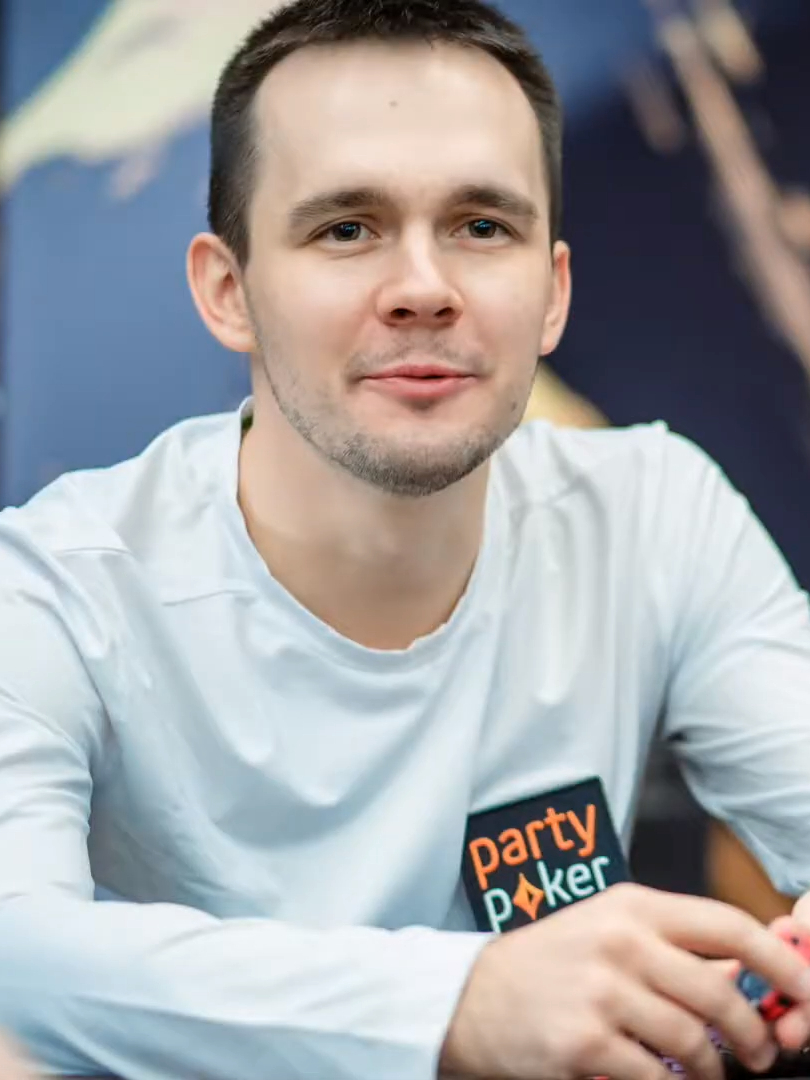
Event #10 champion Mikita Badziakouski

- 2-Day Event: September 16-17, 2021
- Number of Entrants: 38
- Total Prize Pool: $950,000
- Number of Payouts: 6
- Winning Hand: Q♥ 10♠

Final table
Place	Name	Prize
1st	(Belarus) Mikita Badziakouski	$342,000
2nd	(United States) Seth Davies	$228,000
3rd	(Canada) Daniel Negreanu	$152,000
4th	(Bosnia and Herzegovina) Ali Imsirovic	$104,500
5th	(United States) Jason Koon	$76,000

=== Event #11: $50,000 No-Limit Hold'em ===
- 2-Day Event: September 17-18, 2021
- Number of Entrants: 34
- Total Prize Pool: $1,700,000
- Number of Payouts: 5
- Winning Hand: K♦ J♥

Final table
Place	Name	Prize
1st	(Australia) Michael Addamo	$680,000
2nd	(United States) Jason Koon	$442,000
3rd	(United States) David Coleman	$272,000
4th	(United States) Alex Foxen	$187,000
5th	(United States) Cary Katz	$119,000

=== Event #12: $100,000 No-Limit Hold'em ===
- 2-Day Event: September 18-19, 2021
- Number of Entrants: 29
- Total Prize Pool: $2,900,000
- Number of Payouts: 5
- Winning Hand: 7♥ 3♣

Final table
Place	Name	Prize
1st	(Australia) Michael Addamo	$1,160,000
2nd	(United States) Nick Petrangelo	$754,000
3rd	(United States) Alex Foxen	$464,000
4th	(Hong Kong) Stanley Tang	$319,000
5th	(Belarus) Mikita Badziakouski	$203,000
