= 2021 U.S. Poker Open =

Series of poker tournaments

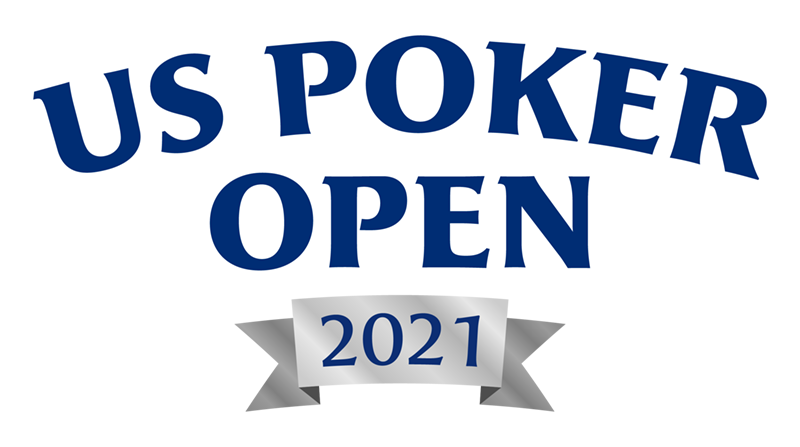
- Venue: PokerGO Studio at Aria Resort and Casino
- Location: Las Vegas, Nevada
- Dates: June 3–15, 2021

Champion
- (United States) David Peters (USPO Champion); (United States) Sean Winter (Main Event winner)

The 2021 U.S. Poker Open was the third edition of the U.S. Poker Open, a series of high-stakes poker tournaments held at Aria Resort and Casino in Las Vegas, Nevada. The series was held from June 3–15, with 12 scheduled events culminating in a $50,000 No-Limit Hold'em tournament. The player who earned the most points throughout the series was crowned the champion, earning $50,000 and the Golden Eagle trophy.

David Peters won three events and cashed four times to win the series championship for the second consecutive time. Sean Winter won the Main Event and finished second in the overall standings, also for the second straight time.

== Schedule ==
#	Event	Entrants	Winner	Prize	Winning hand	Runner-up	Losing hand	Results
1	$10,000 No-Limit Hold'em	95	(United States) Jake Daniels	$218,500	A♠ 3♠	(United States) Dan Shak	K♥ 7♣	Results
2	$10,000 Pot-Limit Omaha	65	(United States) Sam Soverel	$175,500	10♥ 9♣ 7♦ 4♦	(United States) Jordan Cristos	A♣ J♣ 4♠ 2♦	Results
3	$10,000 No-Limit Hold'em	77	(United States) Joe McKeehen	$200,200	J♥ J♦	(United States) Ray Qartomy	5♠ 5♦	Results
4	$10,000 Big Bet Mix	48	(United States) John Riordan	$163,200	9♣ 8♥ 7♣ 6♠ 6♦	(United States) Sean Perry	J♠ J♥ 10♦ 7♦ 2♦	Results
5	$10,000 No-Limit Hold'em	85	(United States) Joey Weissman	$204,000	Q♥ 2♥	(United States) Adam Hendrix	A♣ J♣	Results
6	$10,000 8-Game	68	(Israel) Eli Elezra	$183,600	A♦ 7♦/3♥ 2♦ Q♠ 7♠/9♠	(United States) Steve Zolotow	K♥ 5♠/5♦ 10♣ 4♣ 8♦/J♣	Results
7	$10,000 No-Limit Hold'em	99	(United States) David Peters	$217,800	A♥ 8♣	(United States) Jared Jaffee	K♠ 2♣	Results
8	$10,000 Pot-Limit Omaha	63	(United States) Jared Bleznick	$189,000	A♠ 8♠ 8♥ 7♣	(United States) Maxx Coleman	9♦ 7♦ 6♣ 2♣	Results
9	$10,000 No-Limit Hold'em	99	(Bosnia and Herzegovina) Ali Imsirovic	$217,800	J♣ 6♦	(United States) Andrew Lichtenberger	K♥ J♠	Results
10	$10,000 Short Deck	27	(United States) David Peters	$124,200	J♣ 10♠	(Bosnia and Herzegovina) Ali Imsirovic	Q♦ 8♣	Results
11	$25,000 No-Limit Hold'em	69	(United States) David Peters	$465,750	10♠ 10♦	(Croatia) Ivan Zufic	9♥ 9♣	Results
12	$50,000 No-Limit Hold'em	42	(United States) Sean Winter	$756,000	10♣ 6♣	(United Kingdom) Stephen Chidwick	Q♠ 4♣	Results

== Series leaderboard ==
Standings
Rank	Name	Points	Earnings
1	(United States) David Peters	646	$832,950
2	(United States) Sean Winter	484	$785,700
3	(Bosnia and Herzegovina) Ali Imsirovic	483	$482,000
4	(United Kingdom) Stephen Chidwick	427	$628,700
5	(United States) Dan Shak	371	$459,750

== Results ==
=== Event #1: $10,000 No-Limit Hold'em ===
- 2-Day Event: June 3–4
- Number of Entries: 95
- Total Prize Pool: $950,000
- Number of Payouts: 14
- Winning Hand: A♠ 3♠

Final Table
Place	Name	Prize
1st	(United States) Jake Daniels	$218,500
2nd	(United States) Dan Shak	$152,000
3rd	(United States) Barry Hutter	$114,000
4th	(United Kingdom) Stephen Chidwick	$95,000
5th	(United States) Steve Zolotow	$76,000
6th	(Spain) Sergi Reixach	$57,000
7th	(United States) Tim McDermott	$47,500

=== Event #2: $10,000 Pot-Limit Omaha ===
- 2-Day Event: June 4–5
- Number of Entries: 65
- Total Prize Pool: $650,000
- Number of Payouts: 10
- Winning Hand: 10♥ 9♣ 7♦ 4♦

Final Table
Place	Name	Prize
1st	(United States) Sam Soverel	$175,500
2nd	(United States) Jordan Cristos	$130,000
3rd	(United States) Marc Brody	$84,500
4th	(United States) Dylan Weisman	$65,000
5th	(United States) Maxx Coleman	$52,000
6th	(United States) Matthew Ploof	$39,000

=== Event #3: $10,000 No-Limit Hold'em ===
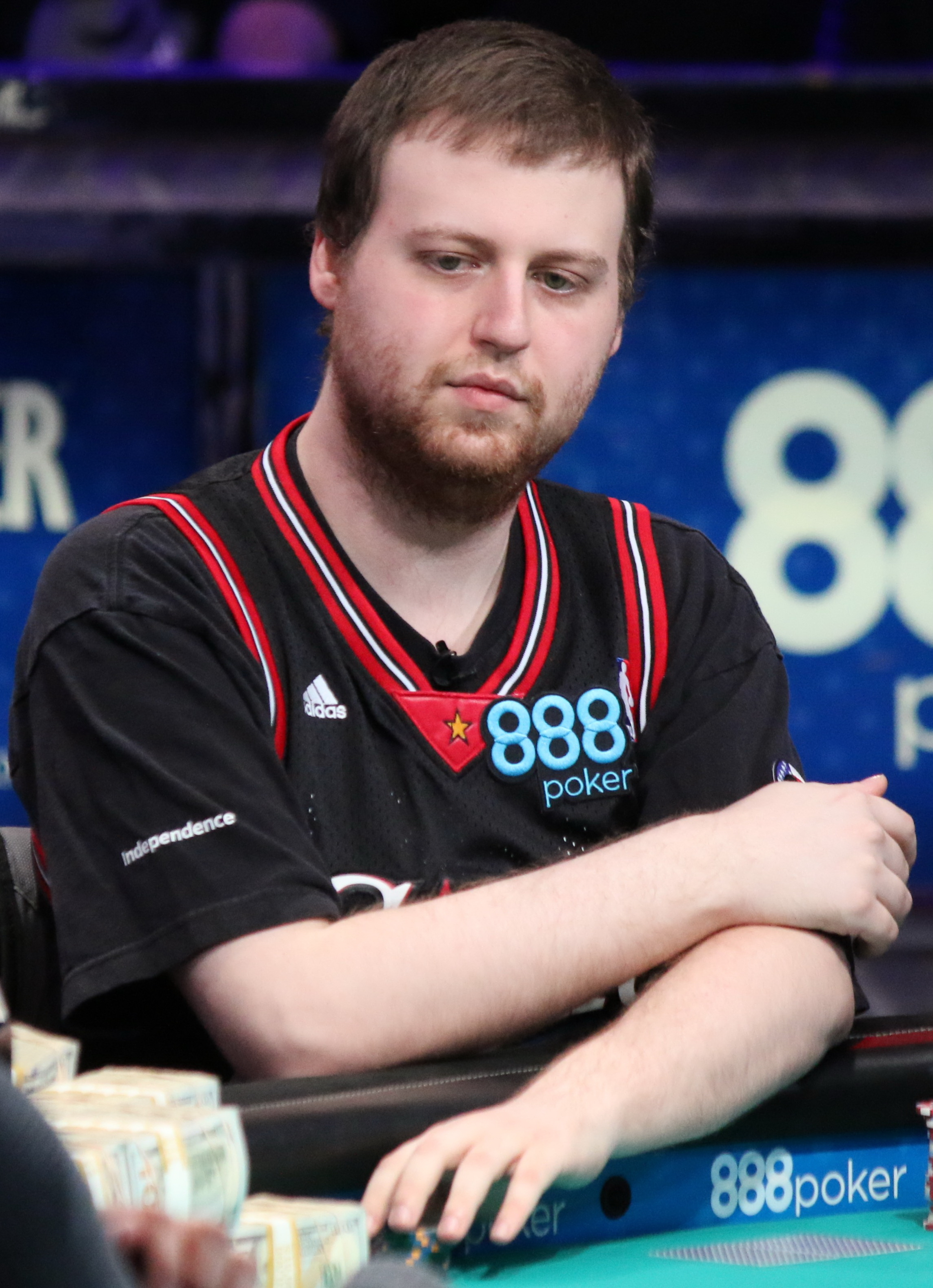
Joe McKeehen won Event #3

- 2-Day Event: June 5–6
- Number of Entries: 77
- Total Prize Pool: $770,000
- Number of Payouts: 11
- Winning Hand: J♥ J♦

Final Table
Place	Name	Prize
1st	(United States) Joe McKeehen	$200,200
2nd	(United States) Ray Qartomy	$146,300
3rd	(Bosnia and Herzegovina) Ali Imsirovic	$100,100
4th	(United States) Steve Zolotow	$77,000
5th	(United States) Jake Schindler	$61,600
6th	(United States) Justin Saliba	$46,200
7th	(United States) Barry Hutter	$38,500

=== Event #4: $10,000 Big Bet Mix ===
- 2-Day Event: June 6–7
- Number of Entries: 48
- Total Prize Pool: $480,000
- Number of Payouts: 7
- Winning Hand: 9♣ 8♥ 7♣ 6♠ 6♦ (2-7 Single Draw)

Final Table
Place	Name	Prize
1st	(United States) John Riordan	$163,200
2nd	(United States) Sean Perry	$105,600
3rd	(United States) Alex Foxen	$72,000
4th	(United States) Maxx Coleman	$52,800
5th	(United States) Brian Okin	$38,400
6th	(United States) Jim Collopy	$28,800

=== Event #5: $10,000 No-Limit Hold'em ===
- 2-Day Event: June 7–8
- Number of Entries: 85
- Total Prize Pool: $850,000
- Number of Payouts: 13
- Winning Hand: Q♥ 2♥

Final Table
Place	Name	Prize
1st	(United States) Joey Weissman	$204,000
2nd	(United States) Adam Hendrix	$144,500
3rd	(United States) Joe McKeehen	$102,000
4th	(United States) Cary Katz	$85,000
5th	(United States) Frank Funaro	$68,000
6th	(United States) Brock Wilson	$51,000
7th	(Spain) Vicent Bosca	$42,500

=== Event #6: $10,000 8-Game ===
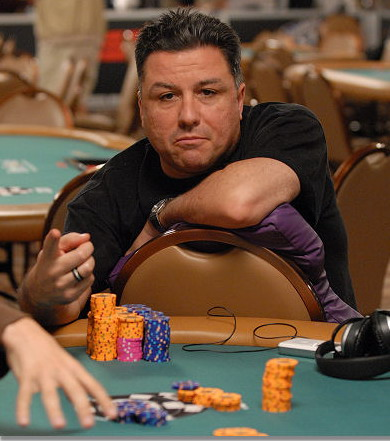
Eli Elezra won Event #6

- 2-Day Event: June 8–9
- Number of Entries: 68
- Total Prize Pool: $680,000
- Number of Payouts: 10
- Winning Hand: A♦ 7♦ / 3♥ 2♦ Q♠ 7♠ / 9♠ (Stud 8)

Final Table
Place	Name	Prize
1st	(Israel) Eli Elezra	$183,600
2nd	(United States) Steve Zolotow	$136,000
3rd	(Canada) Daniel Negreanu	$88,400
4th	(United States) Richard Sklar	$68,000
5th	(Sweden) Erik Sagstrom	$54,400

=== Event #7: $10,000 No-Limit Hold'em ===
- 2-Day Event: June 9–10
- Number of Entries: 99
- Total Prize Pool: $990,000
- Number of Payouts: 15
- Winning Hand: A♥ 8♣

Final Table
Place	Name	Prize
1st	(United States) David Peters	$217,800
2nd	(United States) Jared Jaffee	$158,400
3rd	(United States) Andrew Lichtenberger	$118,800
4th	(United States) Brock Wilson	$89,100
5th	(United States) Alex Foxen	$79,200
6th	(Croatia) Ivan Zufic	$59,400
7th	(United States) Dan Shak	$49,500

=== Event #8: $10,000 Pot-Limit Omaha ===
- 2-Day Event: June 10–11
- Number of Entries: 63
- Total Prize Pool: $630,000
- Number of Payouts: 9
- Winning Hand: A♠ 8♠ 8♥ 7♣

Final Table
Place	Name	Prize
1st	(United States) Jared Bleznick	$189,000
2nd	(United States) Maxx Coleman	$126,000
3rd	(United States) Christopher Usude	$88,200
4th	(Bosnia and Herzegovina) Ali Imsirovic	$63,000
5th	(United States) Joseph Sanders	$50,400
6th	(United States) Frank Crivello	$37,800

=== Event #9: $10,000 No-Limit Hold'em ===
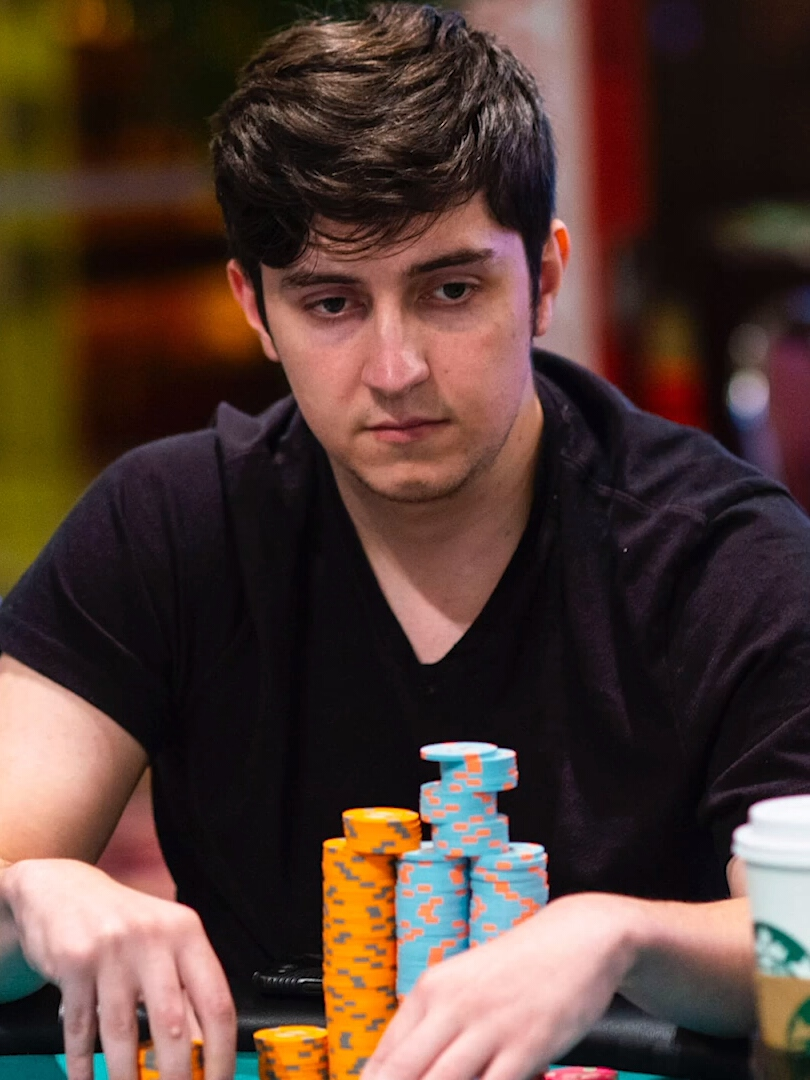
Ali Imsirovic won Event #9

- 2-Day Event: June 11–12
- Number of Entries: 99
- Total Prize Pool: $990,000
- Number of Payouts: 15
- Winning Hand: J♣ 6♦

Final Table
Place	Name	Prize
1st	(Bosnia and Herzegovina) Ali Imsirovic	$217,800
2nd	(United States) Andrew Lichtenberger	$158,400
3rd	(United States) Cary Katz	$118,800
4th	(Canada) Vanessa Kade	$94,050
5th	(United States) Erik Seidel	$74,250
6th	(United States) Thomas Winters	$59,400
7th	(United States) Jake Schindler	$49,500

=== Event #10: $10,000 Short Deck ===
- 2-Day Event: June 12–13
- Number of Entries: 27
- Total Prize Pool: $270,000
- Number of Payouts: 4
- Winning Hand: J♣ 10♠

Final Table
Place	Name	Prize
1st	(United States) David Peters	$124,200
2nd	(Bosnia and Herzegovina) Ali Imsirovic	$75,600
3rd	(United States) Cary Katz	$43,200
4th	(United States) Thomas Kysar	$27,000

=== Event #11: $25,000 No-Limit Hold'em ===
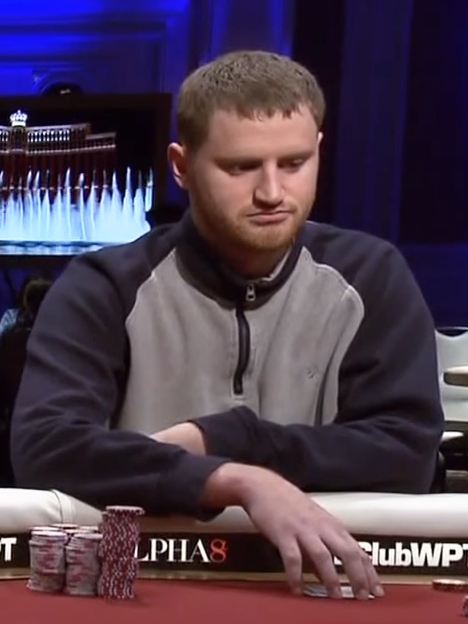
David Peters won three events

- 2-Day Event: June 13–14
- Number of Entries: 69
- Total Prize Pool: $1,725,000
- Number of Payouts: 10
- Winning Hand: 10♠ 10♦

Final Table
Place	Name	Prize
1st	(United States) David Peters	$465,750
2nd	(Croatia) Ivan Zufic	$345,000
3rd	(United States) Dan Shak	$224,250
4th	(United States) Jake Daniels	$172,500
5th	(Canada) Vanessa Kade	$138,000
6th	(United States) Frank Funaro	$103,500

=== Event #12: $50,000 No-Limit Hold'em ===
- 2-Day Event: June 14–15
- Number of Entries: 42
- Total Prize Pool: $2,100,000
- Number of Payouts: 6
- Winning Hand: 10♣ 6♣

Final Table
Place	Name	Prize
1st	(United States) Sean Winter	$756,000
2nd	(United Kingdom) Stephen Chidwick	$504,000
3rd	(United States) Jason Koon	$336,000
4th	(United States) Jonathan Little	$231,000
5th	(United States) Sam Soverel	$168,000
6th	(United States) Bill Klein	$105,000

== Leaders ==
Final Tables
Rank	Name	Final Tables
1	(Bosnia and Herzegovina) Ali Imsirovic	4
T2	(United States) Maxx Coleman	3
T2	(United States) Cary Katz	3
T2	(United States) David Peters	3
T2	(United States) Dan Shak	3
T2	(United States) Steve Zolotow	3

Cashes
Rank	Name	Cashes
1	(Bosnia and Herzegovina) Ali Imsirovic	5
T2	(United States) Alex Foxen	4
T2	(United States) Cary Katz	4
T2	(United States) David Peters	4
T2	(United States) John Riordan	4
T2	(United States) Dan Shak	4
T2	(United States) Sam Soverel	4
