= Sean Winter =

American poker player (born 1990)

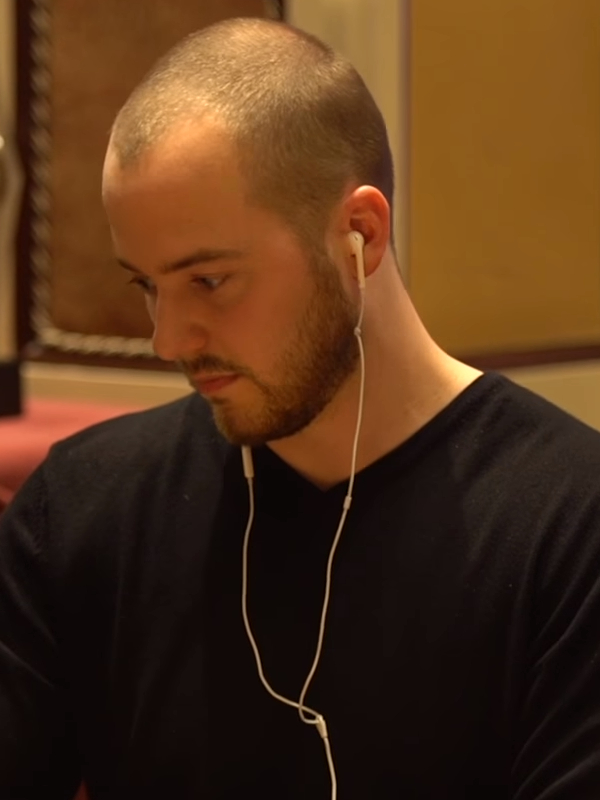
- Winter at the 2018 WPT Bellagio High Roller
- Nickname: nolez7
- Born: December 14, 1990 (age 35); Jacksonville, Florida, U.S.

World Series of Poker
- Bracelet: None
- Final tables: 3
- Money finishes: 20
- Highest WSOP Main Event finish: 99th, 2026

World Poker Tour
- Money finishes: 7

European Poker Tour
- Money finishes: 2

Sean Winter (born December 14, 1990) is an American poker player from Jacksonville, Florida.

Winter's first live tournament cash came in August 2011, when he was still not yet 21 years old. He won the $10,000 Bellagio Cup in 2015 for $562,000, and was runner-up in the $25,000 High Roller at the PokerStars Caribbean Adventure in January 2016, earning $914,000 after a heads-up deal with champion Nick Maimone. In 2019, he won the $5,250 Main Event at the Seminole Hard Rock Poker Open, prevailing over a field of 809 players for $698,000. His largest career cash came in 2018, when he earned $2.4 million with a runner-up finish at the partypoker Live $250,000 Super High Roller in the Bahamas.

Winter has four wins at the U.S. Poker Open, including consecutive Main Events in 2021 and 2022. After finishing runner-up to David Peters in the previous two series, Winter won the last two events in 2022 to earn the series championship and the Golden Eagle Trophy.

At the World Series of Poker, Winter finished second to Ben Yu in the $50,000 No-Limit Hold'em High Roller in 2018. He also cashed in the Main Event three straight years between 2013 and 2015.

Playing under the name nolez7, Winter finished second to Talal Shakerchi in the Spring Championship of Online Poker Main Event in 2016, earning $1,048,000. He also won a World Championship of Online Poker event that year.

As of 2022, Winter is first among players from Florida and in the top-20 among American players with career earnings of more than $21 million.
