= Jake Schindler =

American poker player (born 1989)

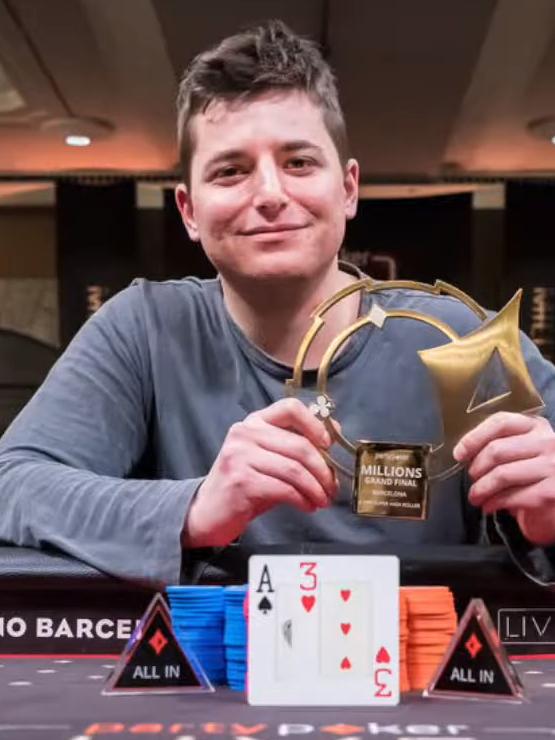
- Schindler at 2018 partypoker Live Millions Barcelona
- Nickname: CaLLitARUSH
- Born: September 25, 1989 (age 37); Bryn Mawr, Pennsylvania, U.S.

World Series of Poker
- Bracelet: 1
- Final tables: 4
- Money finishes: 31
- Highest WSOP Main Event finish: 67th, 2019

World Poker Tour
- Title: None
- Final tables: 3
- Money finishes: 11

European Poker Tour
- Money finishes: 2

Jacob Carl Schindler (born September 25, 1989) is an American professional poker player from Bryn Mawr, Pennsylvania known for his accomplishments in live and online poker tournaments.

== Early life ==
Schindler was raised in Bryn Mawr, Pennsylvania.

== Poker career ==
Schindler began playing live tournaments in 2009. Schindler plays online on PokerStars poker under the alias CaLLitARUSH. In September 2013, he won the World Championship of Online Poker earning nearly $150,000.

His first success at the World Series of Poker was in 2011 where he cashed in the $5,000 No Limit Hold'em - Six Handed and the $1,000 No Limit Hold'em events. In August 2018, Schindler won the SHRPO High Roller for $800,758, defeating Shaun Deeb heads up. Later that year Schindler WPT Five Diamond 100k event, winning $1,332,000 in the process. In 2018, he made 31 final tables, the record for the year, beating Stephen Chidwick who made 26. His success in 2018 earned him the Card Player Player of the Year Award.

As of 2023, Schindler has won over $36,800,000 from live poker tournaments. He is the all-time money leader in Pennsylvania.

In 2022, Jake Schindler faced accusations of cheating, leading to his suspension from all PokerGO events through the 2022 season. The allegations included collusion and the use of real-time assistance.
