= Stephen Chidwick =

English poker player (born 1989)

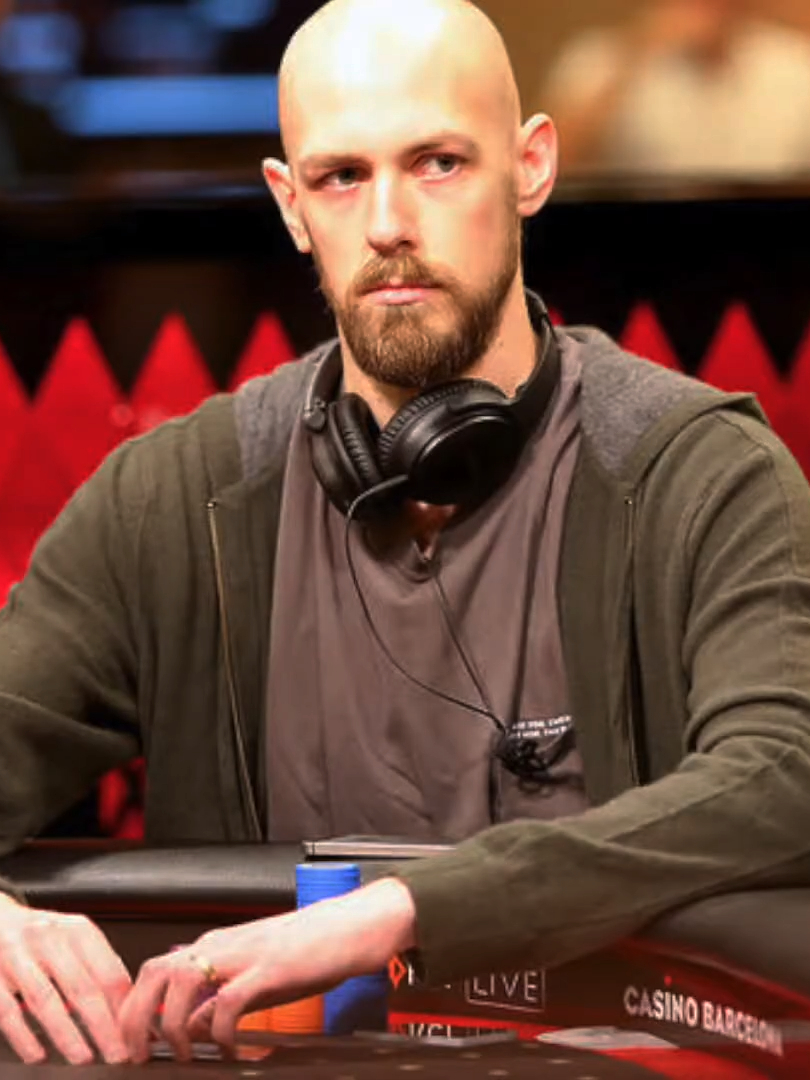
- Chidwick in 2018
- Born: 10 May 1989 (age 37); Deal, Kent, England

World Series of Poker
- Bracelets: 2
- Final tables: 23
- Money finishes: 80
- Highest WSOP Main Event finish: 89th, 2021

World Poker Tour
- Money finishes: 5

European Poker Tour
- Titles: 11
- Final tables: 30
- Money finishes: 59

Stephen James Chidwick (born 10 May 1989) is an English professional poker player from Deal, Kent. Chidwick led the Global Poker Index (GPI) from 18 April to 9 October 2018.

== Poker career ==
Chidwick had his first major poker cash in the 2008 PokerStars Caribbean Adventure with a victory in a $1,000 No Limit Hold'em event for $88,760. He plays online under the alias "stevie444" and "TylersDad64" on various online poker cardrooms. In 2009, Chidwick finished runner-up in the Full Tilt FTOPS Event #17 winning $142,155.30. In 2010, Chidwick made his first cash in World Series of Poker, later cashing in three total events, all $1,500 No Limit Hold'em events. In the 2011 WSOP, he recorded a 4th place in the $10,000 Pot Limit Hold'em Championship for $198,927. In the 2012 WSOP, in the $50,000 Poker Player's Championship, he had a 6th place finish for $253,497. In the 2013 WSOP, he had a 4th place finish in the $25,000 No Limit Hold'em - 6 Handed Event for $353,780. In December 2013, in the EPT Prague Main Event, he finished 3rd for $517,992.

In 2015, Chidwick made two final tables finishing runner-up in the $10,000 Seven-Card Stud Hi-Low Championship, winning $180,529 in the process.

In 2017, Chidwick won the €25,500 No Limit Hold'em - 8 Handed Event at the PokerStars Championship in Barcelona for $813,144 (€690,400).

In 2018, Chidwick finished 3rd in the partypoker LIVE MILLIONS Grand Final Barcelona €10,300 main event winning $1,233,654. In February 2018, he had two first-place finishes in the US Poker Open, one in the $25,000 No Limit Hold'em event for $374,000 and one in the $25,000 Mixed Game Championship for $382,500. For 2018, Chidwick made the second most final tables in live poker tournaments, with a total of 26, finishing behind Jake Schindler, who made 31. Chidwick started 2019 as the United Kingdom's Global Poker Index leader with 3602.31 points.

In February 2019, Chidwick once again took first in two tournaments in the US Poker Open, one in the $10,000 No Limit Hold'em Event for $216,000 and one in the $25,000 Pot Limit Omaha Event for $351,000. In the 2019 WSOP, Chidwick won his first WSOP bracelet in the $25,000 Pot Limit Omaha High Roller event, earning more than $1,618,417. In the 2019 EPT € 50,000 No Limit Hold'em - Super High Roller, he won the event for $802,972. In the 2019 Triton Poker Super High Roller Series in London, he had his largest cash to date with a 4th place finish for $5,368,947.

In May 2022, Chidwick had two seven-figure cashes, one victory in the €100,000 No Limit Short Deck Hold'em - SD Main Event for $1,916,463 and one runner-up finish in the €75,000 No Limit Hold'em - 8-Handed for $1,357,140, in the Triton Poker Series in Madrid.

In 2023, Chidwick had two seven-figure cashes in the Triton Poker Super High Roller Series in London and Vietnam, one runner-up finish and one fifth place finish.

As of 2026, his accumulated live poker tournament winnings exceed $79,000,000, placing him second on the all-time live tournament money list. He has over 40 first-place cashes in major tournaments.

=== World Series of Poker bracelets ===
Year	Tournament	Prize (US$)
2019	$25,000 Pot Limit Omaha High Roller	$1,618,417
2024P	$50,000 Pot-Limit Omaha Championship	$1,357,080

A "P" following a year denotes bracelet(s) won during the World Series of Poker Paradise

=== Poker Go Tour Titles ===
Year	Tournament	Prize (US$)
2021	Poker Masters #7 - $10,000 NLH	$183,600
2022	Triton Madrid #12 - €100k Short Deck	$1,800,000
2022	ARIA High Roller #14 - $10,000 NLH	$174,000
2022	ARIA High Roller #18 - $10,000 NLH	$84,640
2022	ARIA High Roller #19 - $10,000 NLH	$115,000
2022	Bellagio High Roller #9 - $10,000 NLH	$25,000
2022	ARIA High Roller #31: $10,000 NLH	$108,000
2023	ARIA High Roller #1: $10,000 NLH	$124,200
2023	Poker Masters #8 - $25,000 NLH	$400,000
2024	U.S. Poker Open #8 - $25,200 No-Limit Hold'em	$429,000
2025	Super High Roller Series - $15,100 Pot-Limit Omaha	$136,500
2025	NAPT Las Vegas - $50,000 Super High Roller	$557,930

=== Triton Titles ===
Festival	Tournament	Prize
Madrid 2022	€100k Short Deck Main Event	€ 1,800,000
Jeju 2024	$20k Short Deck	$265,000
Jeju II 2025	$200k Short Deck PLPF	$3,455,000
