= David Peters (poker player) =

American poker player (born 1987)

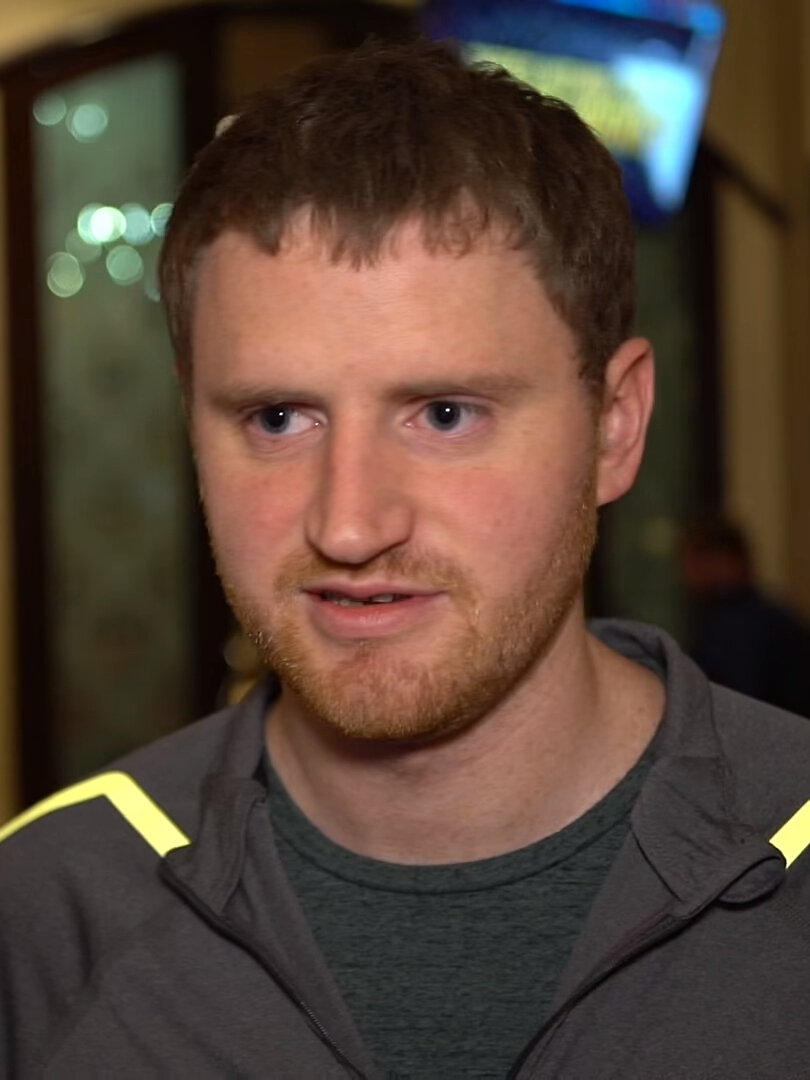
- Peters in 2018
- Nicknames: The Silent Assassin, The Steamroller
- Born: April 16, 1987 (age 39)

World Series of Poker
- Bracelets: 5
- Money finishes: 269
- Highest WSOP Main Event finish: 136th, 2010

World Poker Tour
- Title: None
- Final tables: 2
- Money finishes: 17

European Poker Tour
- Title: None
- Final table: 1
- Money finishes: 5

David Peters (born April 16, 1987) is an American professional poker player from Toledo, Ohio. One of the most prolific tournament players of all time, Peters' live tournament winnings exceed $50,771,000.

== Poker career ==
David Peters declared that he started playing after seeing Chris Moneymaker win the 2003 WSOP Main Event. He looked for some online freerolls, ended up winning one of them for $600.

=== World Series of Poker ===
Peters has won five World Series of Poker bracelets, the first of which came in a $1,500 No Limit Hold'em event at the 2016 World Series of Poker; he won $412,557 as a result of his victory. His second bracelet came during the 2020 World Series of Poker Online, a special version of the World Series that was organized due to the COVID-19 pandemic. His third came in the 2021 WSOP Online in the $7,777 No Limit Hold'em Lucky 7s High Roller. He won his fourth bracelet in the 2022 WSOP in the $75,000 High Roller Bounty No-Limit Hold'em. He won his fifth bracelet in the 2026 World Series of Poker in the $10,000 No Limit Hold'em - 6-Handed Championship. In addition to his bracelet victories, Peters has won 4 World Series of Poker Circuit ring events, earning $245,092. Across all World Series of Poker branded events, Peters has cashed a total of 269 times, with 57 final tables.

==== World Series of Poker bracelets ====
Year	Tournament	Prize (US$)
2016	$1,500 No Limit Hold'em	$412,557
2020 O	$10,000 Heads Up No Limit Hold'em Championship	$360,480
2021 O	$7,777 No Limit Hold'em Lucky 7s High Roller	$283,940
2022	$100,000 High Roller Bounty No-Limit Hold'em	$1,166,810
2026	$10,000 No Limit Hold'em - 6-Handed Championship	$1,001,391

An "O" following a year denotes bracelet(s) won during the World Series of Poker Online

=== World Poker Tour ===
At the World Poker Tour, Peters has career earnings of over $3,900,000. His earnings come from 26 cashes and three final tables. His best finish on the WPT came in the 2016 WPT National - Philippines $200,000 buy-in event. He finished runner-up in that tournament for a cash of $2,699,752, which is his largest cash to date.

=== European Poker Tour ===
At the European Poker Tour, Peters has five career cashes for over $600,000. He has made one final table on the EPT.

=== Triton Titles ===
Festival	Tournament	Prize
Jeju 2018	500K HKD 6-MAX Texas NLH	HKD 8,775,000

=== Poker Go Tour Titles ===
Year	Tournament	Prize
2021	U.S. Poker Open #7 - $10,000 NLH	$217,800
2021	U.S. Poker Open #10 - $10,000 Short Deck	$124,200
2021	U.S. Poker Open #11 - $25,000 NLH	$465,750
2022	WSOP #2 - $100,000 High Roller Bounty NLH	$1,166,810
2022	Seminole Super High Roller - $50,000 NLH	$407,545
2024	PokerGO Cup #1: $5,100 No-Limit Hold'em	$141,525
2024	PokerGO Cup #7: $15,100 No-Limit Hold'em	$315,000

=== Other tournament success ===
On July 4, 2015, Peters scored his first career cash of at least $1 million in the $500,000 No-Limit Hold'em Eight Max tournament held at the 2015 Poker Central Super High Roller Bowl. He finished fifth in the tournament.

In June 2021, Peters won three events over a span of five days at the U.S. Poker Open, earning the series championship for the second time; he also won in 2019.
