= Ali Imsirovic =

Bosnian-American poker player (born 1995)

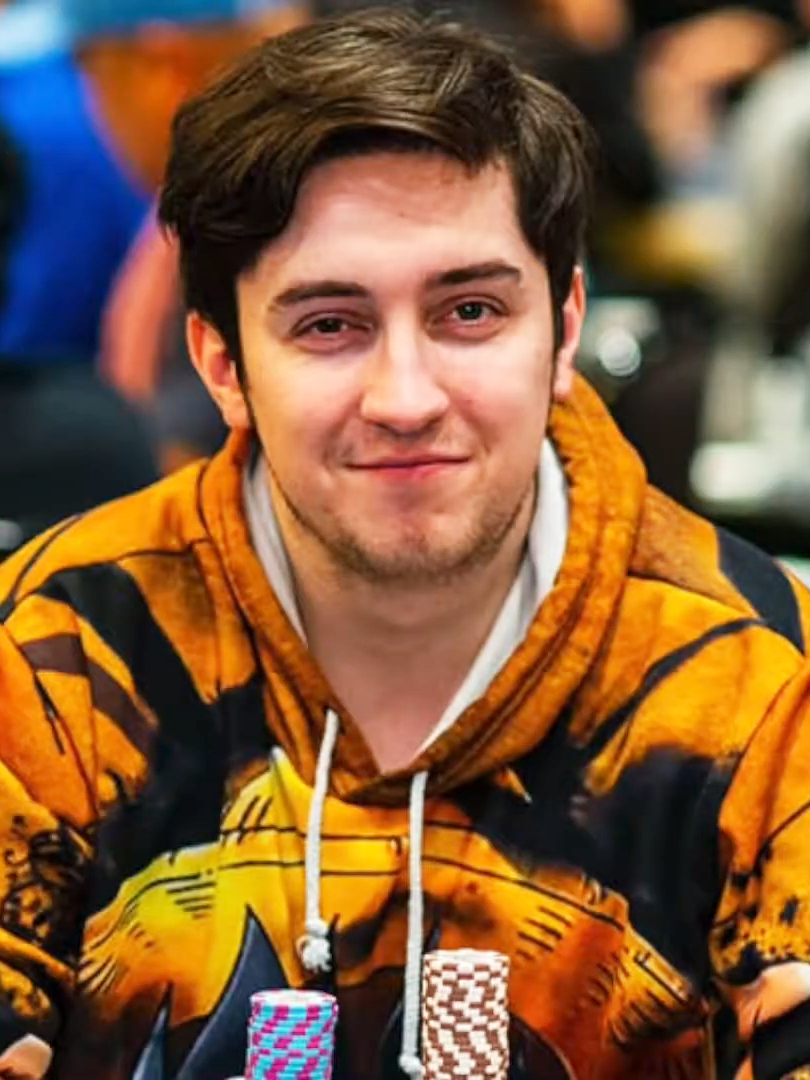
- Imsirovic at 2020 WPT Gardens Poker Championship
- Born: January 29, 1995 (age 31); Zenica, Bosnia and Herzegovina

World Series of Poker
- Bracelet: None
- Final tables: 3
- Money finishes: 29

World Poker Tour
- Money finishes: 11

European Poker Tour
- Money finish: 1

Almedin "Ali" Imsirovic (born January 29, 1995) is a Bosnian-American professional poker player from Vancouver, Washington.

== Early life and education ==
Imsirovic was born in Bosnia and moved to the United States at the age of three with his family after the Bosnian War. Fond of basketball, Ali however had to drop any dreams of turning professional because of ankle problems.

He studied criminal justice at Washington State but dropped out a semester short of graduating to pursue poker full-time right before the Black Friday events, starting illegally with online games at the age of 16.

== Career ==
At the age of 18, Imsirovic joined live tournaments, and won $1,500 in the first poker tournament he ever played in and deposited $100 online to begin his career. He first cashed in a World Series of Poker (WSOP) event in 2017. In 2018, at the age of 23, Imsirovic won two events at the Poker Masters and earned the Purple Jacket as series champion. He also finished seventh at the Super High Roller Bowl that year and was runner-up in the Super High Roller Bowl London in 2019, earning $1.1 million for his largest live tournament cash.

At the WSOP, Imsirovic has 29 cashes and has made three final tables. He finished second in the $10,000 Super Turbo Bounty event in 2019. He also won a WSOP Circuit event in 2019. He has also won two events at the U.S. Poker Open, one in 2019 and another in 2021.

In total, Imsirovic has more than $18.6 million in live tournament winnings as of 2023.

His online aliases are "ali23imsirovic” on Americas Cardroom, “allinali23” on WSOP.com and under his full name “Ali Imsirovic” on Natural8-GGNetwork.

In 2022, Imsirovic faced accusations of cheating, leading to his suspension from all PokerGO events through the 2022 season. The allegations included collusion and the use of real-time assistance. In 2023, Imsirovic admitted to multi-accounting in high-stakes online poker games in a YouTube video, acknowledging a "bad mistake" but denying some other cheating allegations.
