= 2025 PokerGO Tour =

2025 PokerGO Tour season
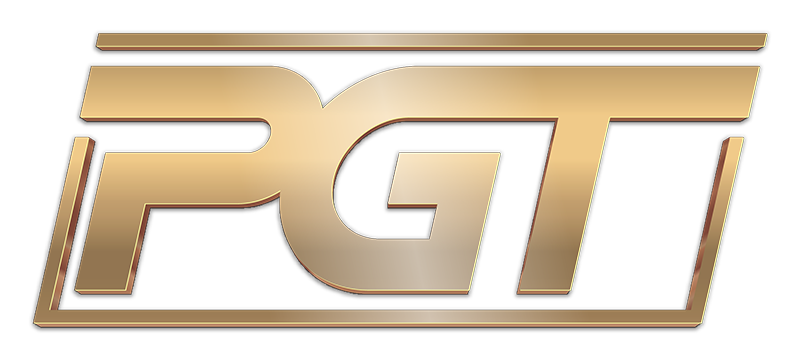
- Duration: January 20, 2025 - January 13, 2026
- Number of official events: 147
- Most wins: (United States) Alex Foxen (5) (United States) Chino Rheem (5)
- 2025 PokerGO Tour Player of the Year: (United States) Alex Foxen (3,134 PGT Points)
- 2025 PokerGO Tour Money Leader: (United States) Michael Mizrachi ($11,391,322)
- 2025 PGT Championship winner: (United States) Chad Eveslage ($500,000)

The 2024 PokerGO Tour was the fifth season of the PokerGO Tour. The season runs for 2025 with the first event beginning on January 20.

The PGT $1,000,000 Championship returned for the 2025 PGT season and was open to the top 40 eligible players on the PGT leaderboard and "Dream Seat" winners. Only players with three PGT cashes during the season would be eligible to participate in the PGT Championship.

The PGT $1,000,000 Championship begun on January 12, 2026, with 54 players. Chad Eveslage defeated Andrew Lichtenberger heads-up to win the $500,000 first-place prize, and was crowned the PGT $1,000,000 Championship winner.

== Leaderboard ==
The top 40 players following the conclusion of all qualifying PokerGO Tour tournaments for 2025 would be invited to play in the season-ending PGT $1,000,000 Championship. Continuing on from the 2024 PGT season, players would need to cash in three PGT events during the season to be eligible to participate in the PGT $1,000,000 Championship. There would also be a select group of "Dream Seat" winners awarded via special events and promotions to grant players exclusive entry into the PGT $1,000,000 Championship.

Players who qualified via the top 40 would have their starting chips based on their position on the PGT leaderboard, with the minimum being 135 big blinds. Players who won a "Dream Seat" at PGT Last Chance would start with 125 big blinds. Players who won a "Dream Seat" through other promotions would start with 100 big blinds.

The 2025 PGT $1,000,000 Championship was a $1,000,000 freeroll with a $500,000 first-place and payouts for the final six players.

Alex Foxen was crowned the 2025 PGT Player of the Year after accumulating 3,134 PGT points from his five wins, 28 cashes, and $6,277,148 in 2025 PGT earnings.

The leaderboard is published on the PokerGO Tour website.

Note: Leaderboard is correct as of January 15, 2026.

2024 PokerGO Tour Leaderboard
Rank	Player	Points	Wins	Cashes	Earnings
1	(United States) Alex Foxen	3,134	5	27	$6,277,148
2	(United States) Sam Soverel	2,979	4	31	$4,160,658
3	(United States) Chino Rheem	2,803	5	35	$3,225,992
4	(United States) Michael Mizrachi	2,286	2	3	$2,714,504
5	(Brazil) Joao Simao	2,272	2	25	$3,906,647
6	(United States) Nick Schulman	2,162	1	28	$2,563,353
7	(United States) Jesse Lonis	1,979	3	24	$2,423,342
8	(United Kingdom) Stephen Chidwick	1,688	2	14	$3,122,284
9	(United States) Andrew Lichtenberger	1,676	1	16	$2,677,932
10	(Canada) Kristen Foxen	1,671	3	17	$1,689,351

== Schedule ==
The full schedule and results for the 2025 PokerGO Tour is published on the website.

(#/#): The first number is the number of PokerGO Tour titles won in 2024. The second number is the total number of PokerGO Tour titles won. Both numbers represent totals as of that point on the PokerGO Tour.

2024 PokerGO Tour Schedule
PGT #	Start date	Tournament	Buy-in	Type	Venue	Location	Winner	Prize	PGT Points	Entrants	Prize Pool
1	January 20	PGT Kickoff #1	$5,100	No-Limit Hold'em	ARIA Resort & Casino	Las Vegas	(United States) Andrew Lichtenberger (1/7)	$117,600	235	84	$420,000
2	January 21	PGT Kickoff #2	$5,100	No-Limit Hold'em	ARIA Resort & Casino	Las Vegas	(United Kingdom) Patrick Leonard (1/1)	$124,800	250	96	$480,000
3	January 22	PGT Kickoff #3	$5,100	No-Limit Hold'em	ARIA Resort & Casino	Las Vegas	(Japan) Masato Yokosawa (1/1)	$142,800	286	112	$560,000
4	January 23	PGT Kickoff #4	$5,100	No-Limit Hold'em	ARIA Resort & Casino	Las Vegas	(United States) Spencer Champlin (1/2)	$157,500	315	126	$630,000
5	January 24	PGT Kickoff #5	$10,100	No-Limit Hold'em	ARIA Resort & Casino	Las Vegas	(Canada) Kristen Foxen (1/2)	$197,625	484	93	$930,000
6	February 11	PokerGO Cup #1	$5,100	No-Limit Hold'em	ARIA Resort & Casino	Las Vegas	(United States) Michael Moncek (1/2)	$185,850	186	177	$885,000
7	February 12	PokerGO Cup #2	$10,100	No-Limit Hold'em	ARIA Resort & Casino	Las Vegas	(United States) Joey Weissman (1/4)	$295,000	295	118	$1,180,000
8	February 13	PokerGO Cup #3	$10,100	No-Limit Hold'em	ARIA Resort & Casino	Las Vegas	(United States) Adam Hendrix (1/6)	$316,050	316	129	$1,290,000
9	February 14	PokerGO Cup #4	$10,100	No-Limit Hold'em	ARIA Resort & Casino	Las Vegas	(United States) Eric Blair (1/1)	$254,800	255	98	$980,000
10	February 15	PokerGO Cup #5	$10,100	No-Limit Hold'em	ARIA Resort & Casino	Las Vegas	(Spain) Sergio Aido (1/3)	$255,000	255	100	$1,000,000
11	February 17	PokerGO Cup #6	$15,100	No-Limit Hold'em	ARIA Resort & Casino	Las Vegas	(United States) Eric Blair (2/2)	$352,350	282	87	$1,305,000
12	February 18	PokerGO Cup #7	$15,100	No-Limit Hold'em	ARIA Resort & Casino	Las Vegas	(Canada) Kristen Foxen (2/3)	$348,300	279	86	$1,290,000
13	February 19	PokerGO Cup #8	$25,200	No-Limit Hold'em	ARIA Resort & Casino	Las Vegas	(United States) Justin Zaki (1/3)	$417,000	283	59	$1,475,000
14	February 25	PGT Mixed Games #1	$5,100	H.O.R.S.E.	ARIA Resort & Casino	Las Vegas	(France) Nicolas Milgrom (1/1)	$159,250	159	130	$650,000
15	February 26	PGT Mixed Games #2	$5,100	8-Game	ARIA Resort & Casino	Las Vegas	(United States) Adam Friedman (1/3)	$170,200	170	148	$740,000
16	February 27	PGT Mixed Games #3	$10,200	H.O.R.S.E.	ARIA Resort & Casino	Las Vegas	(United States) Ryan Miller (1/2)	$247,000	247	95	$950,000
17	February 28	PGT Mixed Games #4	$10,200	8-Game	ARIA Resort & Casino	Las Vegas	(United States) Chino Rheem (1/4)	$195,500	239	92	$920,000
18	March 1	PGT Mixed Games #5	$10,200	Mori's Mix	ARIA Resort & Casino	Las Vegas	(United States) Maxx Coleman (1/3)	$210,000	210	70	$700,000
19	March 3	PGT Mixed Games #6	$15,200	Dealer's Choice	ARIA Resort & Casino	Las Vegas	(Canada) Daniel Negreanu (1/10)	$292,500	234	65	$975,000
20	March 4	PGT Mixed Games #7	$25,300	10-Game	ARIA Resort & Casino	Las Vegas	(Australia) James Obst (1/2)	$462,000	277	56	$1,400,000
21	March 6	Super High Roller Bowl: Mixed Games	$100,500	10-Game	ARIA Resort & Casino	Las Vegas	(United States) Chad Eveslage (1/5)	$1,200,000	400	29	$2,900,000
22	March 25	PGT PLO Series #1	$5,100	Pot-Limit Omaha	ARIA Resort & Casino	Las Vegas	(United States) Ky Nguyen (1/1)	$180,400	180	164	$820,000
23	March 26	PGT PLO Series #2	$5,100	Pot-Limit Omaha	ARIA Resort & Casino	Las Vegas	(United States) Billy Tarango (1/1)	$88,245	$182	159	$795,000
24	March 27	PGT PLO Series #3	$5,100	Pot-Limit Omaha	ARIA Resort & Casino	Las Vegas	(Canada) Daniel Negreanu (2/11)	$182,850	183	159	$795,000
25	March 28	PGT PLO Series #4	$10,100	Pot-Limit Omaha	ARIA Resort & Casino	Las Vegas	(United States) Chino Rheem (2/5)	$295,000	295	118	$1,180,000
26	March 29	PGT PLO Series #5	$10,100	Pot-Limit Omaha	ARIA Resort & Casino	Las Vegas	(United States) Christopher Costa (1/1)	$123,200	236	116	$1,160,000
27	March 31	PGT PLO Series #6	$10,100	Pot-Limit Omaha	ARIA Resort & Casino	Las Vegas	(United States) Dylan Smith (1/1)	$252,450	252	99	$990,000
28	April 1	PGT PLO Series #7	$15,100	Pot-Limit Omaha	ARIA Resort & Casino	Las Vegas	(United States) Alex Foxen (1/8)	$315,000	252	70	$1,050,000
29	April 2	PGT PLO Series #8	$15,100	Pot-Limit Omaha	ARIA Resort & Casino	Las Vegas	(United States) Bryce Yockey (1/2)	$218,400	262	78	$1,170,000
30	April 3	PGT PLO Series #9	$15,100	Pot-Limit Omaha	ARIA Resort & Casino	Las Vegas	(United States) Jesse Lonis (1/4)	$308,850	247	71	$1,065,000
31	April 4	PGT PLO Series #10	$25,100	Pot-Limit Omaha	ARIA Resort & Casino	Las Vegas	(United States) Jim Collopy (1/2)	$450,367	288	60	$1,500,000
32	April 5	PGT PLO Series #11	$5,100	Pot-Limit Omaha	ARIA Resort & Casino	Las Vegas	(United States) Zachary Schwartz (1/1)	$63,510	105	73	$365,000
33	April 8	U.S. Poker Open #1	$5,100	No-Limit Hold'em	ARIA Resort & Casino	Las Vegas	(Canada) Kristen Foxen (3/4)	$158,025	158	129	$645,000
34	April 9	U.S. Poker Open #2	$10,100	No-Limit Hold'em	ARIA Resort & Casino	Las Vegas	(Japan) Kazuomi Furuse (1/1)	$275,400	275	108	$1,080,000
35	April 10	U.S. Poker Open #3	$10,100	No-Limit Hold'em	ARIA Resort & Casino	Las Vegas	(United States) Michael Rossitto (1/1)	$277,950	278	109	$1,090,000
36	April 11	U.S. Poker Open #4	$10,100	No-Limit Hold'em	ARIA Resort & Casino	Las Vegas	(United States) Matthew Wantman (1/4)	$231,300	263	103	$1,030,000
37	April 12	U.S. Poker Open #5	$10,100	No-Limit Hold'em	ARIA Resort & Casino	Las Vegas	(United States) Shannon Shorr (1/5)	$220,400	220	76	$760,000
38	April 14	U.S. Poker Open #6	$15,100	No-Limit Hold'em	ARIA Resort & Casino	Las Vegas	(United States) Brandon Wilson (1/3)	$382,200	306	98	$1,470,000
39	April 15	U.S. Poker Open #7	$15,100	No-Limit Hold'em	ARIA Resort & Casino	Las Vegas	(United States) Alex Foxen (2/9)	$340,200	272	81	$1,215,000
40	April 16	U.S. Poker Open #8	$25,200	No-Limit Hold'em	ARIA Resort & Casino	Las Vegas	(United States) Shannon Shorr (2/6)	$529,250	318	73	$1,825,000
41	April 23	Texas Poker Open Main Event	$3,300	No-Limit Hold'em	Champions Club Texas	Houston	(United States) Ravee Sundara (1/1)	$283,143	283	699	$2,097,000
42	April 25	Texas Poker Open High Roller #1	$5,100	No-Limit Hold'em	Champions Club Texas	Houston	(United States) Ray Qartomy (1/1)	$40,500	41	15	$75,000
43	April 26	Texas Poker Open High Roller #2	$5,100	No-Limit Hold'em	Champions Club Texas	Houston	(United States) David Chen (1/2)	$54,000	54	24	$120,000
44	April 27	Texas Poker Open High Roller #3	$5,100	No-Limit Hold'em	Champions Club Texas	Houston	(Canada) Elliot Smith (1/1)	$58,680	59	39	$195,000
45	April 28	Texas Poker Open High Roller #4	$5,100	No-Limit Hold'em	Champions Club Texas	Houston	(United States) Ray Qartomy (2/2)	$41,700	42	25	$125,000
46	May 30	WSOP #7	$25,000	No-Limit Hold'em	Horseshoe / Paris	Las Vegas	(United States) Artur Martirosyan (1/6)	$500,000	300	64	$1,504,000
47	May 31	WSOP #9	$10,000	Omaha Hi-Lo	Horseshoe / Paris	Las Vegas	(United States) Ryan Bambrick (1/1)	$470,437	470	217	$2,018,100
48	June 1	WSOP #11	$10,000	No-Limit Hold'em	Horseshoe / Paris	Las Vegas	(United States) Yosef Fox (1/1)	$729,333	729	616	$5,728,800
49	June 2	WSOP #14	$25,000	No-Limit Hold'em / Pot-Limit Omaha	Horseshoe / Paris	Las Vegas	(United States) Lou Garza (1/2)	$1,302,233	700	245	$5,757,500
50	June 3	WSOP #18	$10,000	Dealer's Choice	Horseshoe / Paris	Las Vegas	(United States) Ryan Hoenig (1/1)	$354,444	354	152	$1,413,600
51	June 5	WSOP #22	$25,000	No-Limit Hold'em	Horseshoe / Paris	Las Vegas	(Slovenia) Blaz Zerjav (1/1)	$1,734,717	750	336	$7,896,000
52	June 6	WSOP #25	$10,000	Seven Card Stud	Horseshoe / Paris	Las Vegas	(United States) Nick Guagenti (1/3)	$295,008	295	127	$1,181,100
53	June 7	WSOP #26	$25,000	No-Limit Hold'em	Horseshoe / Paris	Las Vegas	(China) Chang Lee (1/1)	$1,949,044	750	392	$9,212,000
54	June 8	WSOP #30	$10,000	No-Limit 2-7 Single Draw	Horseshoe / Paris	Las Vegas	(United States) Nick Schulman (1/7)	$497,356	497	233	$2,166,900
55	June 9	WSOP #32	$50,000	No-Limit Hold'em	Horseshoe / Paris	Las Vegas	(United States) Jason Koon (1/6)	$1,968,927	750	171	$8,122,500
56	June 10	WSOP #36	$10,000	Pot-Limit Omaha Hi-Lo	Horseshoe / Paris	Las Vegas	(United Kingdom) Philip Sternheimer (1/2)	$763,087	763	386	$3,589,800
57	June 11	WSOP #38	$100,000	No-Limit Hold'em	Horseshoe / Paris	Las Vegas	(Portugal) Joao Vieira (1/2)	$2,649,158	550	103	$9,939,500
58	June 12	WSOP #41	$10,000	Limit Hold'em	Horseshoe / Paris	Las Vegas	(United States) Ian Johns (1/1)	$282,455	282	118	$1,097,400
59	June 14	WSOP #44	$10,000	Big O	Horseshoe / Paris	Las Vegas	(United States) Veerachai Vongxaiburana (1/1)	$784,353	784	402	$3,738,600
60	June 15	WSOP #46	$250,000	No-Limit Hold'em	Horseshoe / Paris	Las Vegas	(United States) Seth Davies (1/6)	$4,752,551	700	63	$15,513,750
61	June 15	ARIA High Roller #1	$10,100	Pot-Limit Omaha	ARIA Resort & Casino	Las Vegas	(United States) Griffin Paul (1/1)	$171,500	172	49	$490,000
62	June 16	WSOP #50	$10,000	Razz	Horseshoe / Paris	Las Vegas	(United States) Brian Rast (1/2)	$306,644	307	134	$1,246,200
63	June 16	ARIA High Roller #2	$10,100	Pot-Limit Omaha	ARIA Resort & Casino	Las Vegas	(Bulgaria) Veselin Karakitukov (1/2)	$79,650	80	34	$340,000
64	June 17	WSOP #51	$25,000	Pot-Limit Omaha	Horseshoe / Paris	Las Vegas	(Germany) Dennis Weiss (1/1)	$2,292,155	800	489	$11,491,500
65	June 18	WSOP #55	$10,000	H.O.R.S.E.	Horseshoe / Paris	Las Vegas	(United States) Kristopher Tong (1/1)	$452,689	453	207	$1,925,100
66	June 20	WSOP #57	$50,000	Pot-Limit Omaha	Horseshoe / Paris	Las Vegas	(United States) Dylan Linde (1/2)	$2,146,414	800	194	$9,215,000
67	June 23	ARIA High Roller #3	$10,100	Pot-Limit Omaha	ARIA Resort & Casino	Las Vegas	(United States) Sam Soverel (1/10)	$122,400	122	34	$340,000
68	June 24	WSOP #66	$50,000	9-Game	Horseshoe / Paris	Las Vegas	(United States) Michael Mizrachi (1/1)	$1,331,322	700	107	$5,082,500
69	June 24	ARIA High Roller #4	$10,100	Pot-Limit Omaha	ARIA Resort & Casino	Las Vegas	(United States) Joni Jouhkimainen (1/2)	$111,600	112	31	$310,000
70	June 25	ARIA High Roller #5	$10,100	Pot-Limit Omaha	ARIA Resort & Casino	Las Vegas	(United States) Sam Soverel (2/11)	$112,500	113	25	$250,000
71	June 26	WSOP #71	$10,000	2-7 Triple Draw	Horseshoe / Paris	Las Vegas	(United States) Alexander Wilkinson (1/1)	$333,054	333	141	$1,311,300
72	June 26	ARIA High Roller #6	$10,100	Pot-Limit Omaha	ARIA Resort & Casino	Las Vegas	(Philippines) Marc Rivera (1/1)	$133,200	133	37	$370,000
73	June 27	WSOP #72	$10,000	No-Limit Hold'em	Horseshoe / Paris	Las Vegas	(Germany) Rainer Kempe (1/1)	$892,701	893	809	$7,523,700
74	June 28	WSOP #74	$10,000	Pot-Limit Omaha	Horseshoe / Paris	Las Vegas	(United States) Michael Wang (1/3)	$1,394,579	1,100	874	$8,128,200
75	June 30	WSOP #77	$10,000	Seven Card Stud Hi-Lo	Horseshoe / Paris	Las Vegas	(United States) Qinghai Pan (1/1)	$411,051	411	186	$1,729,800
76	July 1	WSOP #79	$100,000	Pot-Limit Omaha	Horseshoe / Paris	Las Vegas	(United States) Shaun Deeb (1/3)	$2,957,229	550	121	$11,676,500
77	July 2	WSOP #81	$10,000	No-Limit Hold'em	Horseshoe / Paris	Las Vegas	(United States) Michael Mizrachi (2/2)	$10,000,000	1,550	9,735	$90,535,500
78	July 2	WSOP #82	$10,000	8-Game	Horseshoe / Paris	Las Vegas	(United States) Mike Gorodinsky (1/2)	$422,421	422	195	$1,813,500
79	July 3	ARIA High Roller #7	$15,100	No-Limit Hold'em	ARIA Resort & Casino	Las Vegas	(United States) Jesse Lonis (2/5)	$278,400	223	58	$870,000
80	July 4	ARIA High Roller #8	$15,100	No-Limit Hold'em	ARIA Resort & Casino	Las Vegas	(United States) Ray Qartomy (3/3)	$270,000	216	75	$1,125,000
81	July 5	ARIA High Roller #9	$15,100	No-Limit Hold'em	ARIA Resort & Casino	Las Vegas	(Moldova) Pavel Plesuv (3/3)	$215,790	173	44	$660,000
82	July 6	ARIA High Roller #10	$15,100	No-Limit Hold'em	ARIA Resort & Casino	Las Vegas	(Belarus) Mikita Badziakouski (3/3)	$250,000	200	59	$885,000
83	July 7	ARIA High Roller #11	$15,100	No-Limit Hold'em	ARIA Resort & Casino	Las Vegas	(Venezuela) Christian Roberts (1/1)	$358,800	287	92	$1,380,000
84	July 9	WSOP #88	$50,000	No-Limit Hold'em	Horseshoe / Paris	Las Vegas	(United States) Nguyen Le (1/2)	$2,686,913	850	252	$11,970,000
85	July 12	WSOP #94	$10,000	No-Limit Hold'em	Horseshoe / Paris	Las Vegas	(United States) Sam Soverel (3/12)	$986,337	986	546	$5,077,800
86	July 14	WSOP #98	$25,000	H.O.R.S.E.	Horseshoe / Paris	Las Vegas	(United States) Chad Eveslage (2/6)	$883,841	530	150	$3,525,000
87	September 1	PGT Bounty Blitz #1	$5,100	No-Limit Hold'em	ARIA Resort & Casino	Las Vegas	(United States) Jeremy Becker (1/2)	$45,600	76	46	$230,000
88	September 2	PGT Bounty Blitz #2	$5,100	No-Limit Hold'em	ARIA Resort & Casino	Las Vegas	(Spain) Sergio Aido (2/4)	$47,500	79	48	$240,000
89	September 3	PGT Bounty Blitz #3	$5,100	No-Limit Hold'em	ARIA Resort & Casino	Las Vegas	(United States) Landon Tice (1/1)	$47,500	79	51	$255,000
90	September 4	PGT Bounty Blitz #4	$5,100	No-Limit Hold'em	ARIA Resort & Casino	Las Vegas	(United States) Chino Rheem (3/6)	$28,100	54	36	$180,000
91	September 5	PGT Bounty Blitz #5	$5,100	No-Limit Hold'em	ARIA Resort & Casino	Las Vegas	(United States) Jason Hickey (1/1)	$50,000	83	59	$295,000
92	September 6	PGT Bounty Blitz #6	$5,100	No-Limit Hold'em	ARIA Resort & Casino	Las Vegas	(United States) Sam Laskowitz (1/2)	$36,500	61	38	$190,000
93	September 11	PGT Venetian Las Vegas Classic Main Event	$3,300	No-Limit Hold'em	Venetian Las Vegas	Las Vegas	(United States) Daniel Lee (1/1)	$250,000	250	418	$1,254,000
94	September 14	PGT Venetian Las Vegas Classic High Roller #1	$5,100	No-Limit Hold'em	Venetian Las Vegas	Las Vegas	(United States) Sam Laskowitz (2/3)	$84,150	84	51	$255,000
95	September 15	PGT Venetian Las Vegas Classic High Roller #2	$5,100	No-Limit Hold'em	Venetian Las Vegas	Las Vegas	(United States) Jeremy Ausmus (1/8)	$99,200	99	62	$310,000
96	September 16	PGT Venetian Las Vegas Classic High Roller #3	$5,100	No-Limit Hold'em	Venetian Las Vegas	Las Vegas	(United States) Craig Mason (1/1)	$85,750		49	$245,000
97	September 19	Poker Masters #1	$5,100	No-Limit Hold'em	ARIA Resort & Casino	Las Vegas	(United States) David Coleman (1/5)	$270,000	270	239	$1,195,000
98	September 22	Poker Masters #2	$5,100	No-Limit Hold'em	ARIA Resort & Casino	Las Vegas	(United States) Mike Zulker (1/1)	$157,000	157	130	$650,000
99	September 23	Poker Masters #3	$10,100	No-Limit Hold'em	ARIA Resort & Casino	Las Vegas	(United States) Andrew Moreno (1/2)	$252,000	252	101	$1,010,000
100	September 24	Poker Masters #4	$10,100	No-Limit Hold'em	ARIA Resort & Casino	Las Vegas	(United States) Darren Elias (1/4)	$280,000	280	112	$1,120,000
101	September 25	Poker Masters #5	$10,100	No-Limit Hold'em	ARIA Resort & Casino	Las Vegas	(United States) Chino Rheem (4/7)	$280,000	280	112	$1,120,000
102	September 26	Poker Masters #6	$10,100	No-Limit Hold'em	ARIA Resort & Casino	Las Vegas	(United States) Alex Foxen (3/10)	$272,000	272	109	$1,090,000
103	September 27	Poker Masters #7	$10,100	No-Limit Hold'em	ARIA Resort & Casino	Las Vegas	(United States) Cary Katz (1/7)	$223,300	223	77	$770,000
104	September 29	Poker Masters #8	$15,100	No-Limit Hold'em	ARIA Resort & Casino	Las Vegas	(United States) Nguyen Le (2/2)	$301,000	241	67	$1,005,000
105	September 30	Poker Masters #9	$15,100	No-Limit Hold'em	ARIA Resort & Casino	Las Vegas	(United States) Justin Saliba (1/2)	$301,000	241	67	$1,005,000
106	October 1	Poker Masters #10	$25,200	No-Limit Hold'em	ARIA Resort & Casino	Las Vegas	(United States) Brandon Wilson (2/4)	$464,000	302	63	$1,575,000
107	October 14	PGT PLO Series II #1	$5,100	Pot-Limit Omaha	ARIA Resort & Casino	Las Vegas	(United States) Jesse Lonis (3/6)	$175,000	175	146	$730,000
108	October 15	PGT PLO Series II #2	$5,100	Pot-Limit Omaha	ARIA Resort & Casino	Las Vegas	(United States) Alex Foxen (4/11)	$87,000	144	133	$665,000
109	October 16	PGT PLO Series II #3	$5,100	Pot-Limit Omaha	ARIA Resort & Casino	Las Vegas	(United States) Erik Seidel (1/4)	$171,500	172	143	$715,000
110	October 17	PGT PLO Series II #4	$10,100	Pot-Limit Omaha	ARIA Resort & Casino	Las Vegas	(United States) Ben Lamb (1/3)	$292,500	293	117	$1,170,000
111	October 18	PGT PLO Series II #5	$10,100	Pot-Limit Omaha	ARIA Resort & Casino	Las Vegas	(United States) Sean Winter (1/7)	$122,300	253	106	$1,060,000
112	October 20	PGT PLO Series II #6	$10,100	Pot-Limit Omaha	ARIA Resort & Casino	Las Vegas	(United States) Bryce Yockey (2/3)	$237,600	238	88	$880,000
113	October 21	PGT PLO Series II #7	$15,100	Pot-Limit Omaha	ARIA Resort & Casino	Las Vegas	(Bulgaria) Veselin Karakitukov (2/3)	$348,300	279	86	$1,290,000
114	October 22	PGT PLO Series II #8	$15,100	Pot-Limit Omaha	ARIA Resort & Casino	Las Vegas	(United States) Taylor Wilson (1/2)	$195,000	234	65	$975,000
115	October 23	PGT PLO Series II #9	$15,100	Pot-Limit Omaha	ARIA Resort & Casino	Las Vegas	(United States) Bryce Yockey (3/4)	$290,000	232	65	$975,000
116	October 24	PGT PLO Series II #10	$25,200	Pot-Limit Omaha	ARIA Resort & Casino	Las Vegas	(United States) Chino Rheem (5/8)	$510,000	306	68	$1,700,000
117	October 27	Super High Roller Bowl: Pot-Limit Omaha	$100,500	Pot-Limit Omaha	ARIA Resort & Casino	Las Vegas	(United States) John Riordan (1/3)	$1,250,000	400	37	$3,700,000
118	October 28	Super High Roller Series #1	$15,100	Pot-Limit Omaha	ARIA Resort & Casino	Las Vegas	(United Kingdom) Stephen Chidwick (1/11)	$136,500	109	13	$195,000
119	October 29	Super High Roller Series #2	$15,100	Pot-Limit Omaha	ARIA Resort & Casino	Las Vegas	(United Kingdom) Gruffudd Pugh-Jones (1/11)	$148,500	119	35	$525,000
120	November 3	NAPT Las Vegas #5	$10,000	No-Limit Hold'em	Resorts World	Las Vegas	(United States) Cherish Andrews (1/1)	$111,300	111	84	$814,800
121	November 4	NAPT Las Vegas #9	$20,000	No-Limit Hold'em	Resorts World	Las Vegas	(United States) Nick Petrangelo (1/7)	$309,030	247	53	$1,012,830
122	November 5	NAPT Las Vegas #12	$50,000	No-Limit Hold'em	Resorts World	Las Vegas	(United Kingdom) Stephen Chidwick (2/12)	$557,930	223	23	$1,115,730
123	November 5	NAPT Las Vegas #13	$10,000	No-Limit Hold'em / Pot-Limit Omaha	Resorts World	Las Vegas	(Brazil) Joao Simao (1/2)	$174,600	175	60	$582,000
124	November 6	NAPT Las Vegas #22	$25,000	Pot-Limit Omaha	Resorts World	Las Vegas	(United States) Sean Rafael (1/1)	$171,700	103	11	$264,110
125	November 8	NAPT Las Vegas #30	$10,000	No-Limit Hold'em	Resorts World	Las Vegas	(United States) Jordan Glazer (1/1)	$42,750	43	14	$65,800
126	November 9	NAPT Las Vegas #32	$12,000	No-Limit Hold'em	Resorts World	Las Vegas	(United States) Sam Soverel (4/13)	$116,840	117	39	$458,640
127	November 10	NAPT Las Vegas #42	$10,000	No-Limit Hold'em	Resorts World	Las Vegas	(Latvia) Vitalijs Zavorotnijs (1/1)	$358,400	358	158	$1,532,600
128	November 20	Texas PLO Roundup Main Event	$3,300	Pot-Limit Omaha	Champions Club Texas	Houston	(United States) Stephen Hubbard (1/2)	$215,000	215	337	$1,011,000
129	November 22	Texas PLO Roundup High Roller #1	$5,100	Pot-Limit Omaha	Champions Club Texas	Houston	(United States) Stephen Hubbard (2/3)	$36,000	36	11	$55,000
130	November 23	Texas PLO Roundup High Roller #2	$5,100	Pot-Limit Omaha	Champions Club Texas	Houston	(United States) Brevin Andreadis (1/1)	$38,500	39	11	$55,000
131	November 24	Texas PLO Roundup High Roller #3	$5,100	Pot-Limit Omaha	Champions Club Texas	Houston	(United States) Bryce Yockey (4/5)	$45,500	46	13	$65,000
132	December 2	PGT True Classic Rags To Riches	$3,300	No-Limit Hold'em	ARIA Resort & Casino	Las Vegas	(United States) Daniel Maor (1/1)	$110,000	110	161	$483,000
133	December 6	WSOP Paradise #4	$50,000	No-Limit Hold'em	Atlantis Paradise Island	Bahamas	(Austria) Daniel Rezaei (1/1)	$1,900,000	750	151	$7,474,500
134	December 8	WSOP Paradise #7	$10,000	Pot-Limit Omaha	Atlantis Paradise Island	Bahamas	(Netherlands) Tom Vogelsang (1/2)	$609,800	610	284	$2,754,800
135	December 10	WSOP Paradise #11	$25,000	No-Limit Hold'em	Atlantis Paradise Island	Bahamas	(Austria) Bernhard Binder (1/1)	$10,000,000	1,600	2,891	$70,106,750
136	December 11	WSOP Paradise #12	$10,000	8-Game	Atlantis Paradise Island	Bahamas	(Germany) Koray Aldemir (1/2)	$287,800	288	115	$1,115,500
137	December 13	WSOP Paradise #13	$50,000	Pot-Limit Omaha	Atlantis Paradise Island	Bahamas	(United States) Chalie Hook (1/1)	$1,456,000	700	115	$5,537,000
138	December 15	WSOP Paradise #14	$25,000	No-Limit Hold'em	Atlantis Paradise Island	Bahamas	(France) Johan Guilbert (1/3)	$1,534,645	750	287	$7,098,945
139	December 17	WSOP Paradise	$50,000	9-Game	Atlantis Paradise Island	Bahamas	(United States) Aaron Kupin (1/1)	$282,609	113	19	$931,000
140	December 20	Super High Roller Bowl X	$101,000	No-Limit Hold'em	ARIA Resort & Casino	Las Vegas	(Brazil) Joao Simao (2/3)	$1,100,000	400	23	$2,300,000
141	January 5, 2026	PGT Last Chance #1	$10,100	No-Limit Hold'em	ARIA Resort & Casino	Las Vegas	(United States) Clemen Deng (1/3)	$277,950	278	109	$1,090,000
142	January 6, 2026	PGT Last Chance #2	$10,100	No-Limit Hold'em	ARIA Resort & Casino	Las Vegas	(United Kingdom) Patrick Leonard (2/2)	$315,000	315	126	$1,260,000
143	January 7, 2026	PGT Last Chance #3	$10,100	No-Limit Hold'em	ARIA Resort & Casino	Las Vegas	(United States) Brandon Wilson (3/5)	$275,400	275	108	$1,080,000
144	January 8, 2026	PGT Last Chance #4	$10,100	No-Limit Hold'em	ARIA Resort & Casino	Las Vegas	(United States) Neil Warren (1/1)	$315,000	315	126	$1,260,000
145	January 9, 2026	PGT Last Chance #5	$10,100	No-Limit Hold'em	ARIA Resort & Casino	Las Vegas	(Taiwan) Chi-Jen Chu (1/1)	$263,850	293	117	$1,170,000
146	January 10, 2026	PGT Last Chance #6	$10,100	No-Limit Hold'em	ARIA Resort & Casino	Las Vegas	(United States) Alex Foxen (5/12)	$232,400	232	83	$830,000
147	January 12, 2026	PGT $1,000,000 Championship	--	No-Limit Hold'em	ARIA Resort & Casino	Las Vegas	(United States) Chad Eveslage (3/7)	$500,000	--	54	$1,000,000
