= 2024 U.S. Poker Open =

Series of poker tournaments

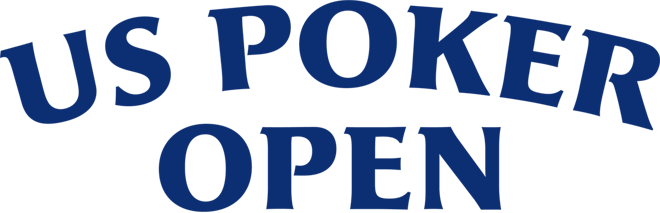
- Venue: PokerGO Studio at Aria Resort and Casino
- Location: Las Vegas, Nevada
- Dates: April 8-17, 2024

Champion
- (United States) Aram Zobian (USPO winner) (United Kingdom) Stephen Chidwick (Main Event winner)

The 2024 U.S. Poker Open was the sixth edition of the U.S. Poker Open, an annual series of high stakes poker tournaments held inside the PokerGO Studio in the Aria Resort and Casino in Las Vegas, Nevada. The series was held from April 8 – 17 and featured eight events, culminating in the $25,000 No-Limit Hold'em main event.

Aram Zobian claimed victory at the U.S. Poker Open at the PokerGO Studio in Las Vegas, winning the prestigious Golden Eagle trophy and $25,000 PGT Passport bonus prize. Zobian finished the eight-event series with one victory, four cashes, and more than $600,000 in prize money won. He topped the 2024 U.S. Poker Open leaderboard with 616 points, nearly 200 points ahead of any other competitor.

== Schedule ==
| # | Event | Entrants | Winner | Prize | Winning hand | Runner-up | Losing hand | Results |
|---|---|---|---|---|---|---|---|---|
| 1 | $5,100 No-Limit Hold'em | 116 | (United States) Erik Seidel | $145,000 | A♠ A♦ | (United States) Eric Afriat | 9♠ 9♦ | Results |
| 2 | $10,100 No-Limit Hold'em | 99 | (United States) Jesse Lonis | $252,450 | 9♦ 7♦ | (United States) Aram Zobian | Q♦ 10♠ | Results |
| 3 | $10,100 No-Limit Hold'em | 84 | (United States) Dan Smith | $235,200 | A♣ 9♥ | (United States) Rodger Johnson | A♠ 4♦ | Results |
| 4 | $10,100 No-Limit Hold'em | 83 | (United States) David Coleman | $202,300 | K♠ J♠ | (United States) Shannon Shorr | 10♦ 8♥ | Results |
| 5 | $10,100 No-Limit Hold'em | 92 | (United States) Matthew Wantman | $239,200 | K♣ 3♦ | (Canada) Daniel Negreanu | J♦ 8♠ | Results |
| 6 | $15,100 No-Limit Hold'em | 62 | (United States) Aram Zobian | $264,290 | J♠ 10♠ | (United States) Samuel Laskowitz | K♦ 8♦ | Results |
| 7 | $15,000 No-Limit Hold'em | 64 | (Canada) Eric Afriat | $288,000 | A♣ Q♣ | (United States) Joey Weissman | K♣ J♦ | Results |
| 8 | $25,200 No-Limit Hold'em | 52 | (England) Stephen Chidwick | $429,000 | 8♥ 4♣ | (United States) Andrew Lichtenberger | 3♣ 3♠ | Results |

== Series leaderboard ==
Final standings
| Rank | Name | Points | Earnings | Wins | Cashes |
|---|---|---|---|---|---|
| 1 | (United States) Aram Zobian | 569 | $535,540 | 1 | 3 |
| 2 | (United States) Jesse Lonis | 369 | $369,450 | 1 | 3 |
| 3 | (United States) Rodger Johnson | 301 | $301,450 | 0 | 5 |
| 4 | (United States) David Coleman | 291 | $261,100 | 1 | 2 |
| 5 | (United States) Matthew Wantman | 269 | $268,900 | 1 | 2 |

== Event results ==
=== Event #1: $5,100 No-Limit Hold'em ===
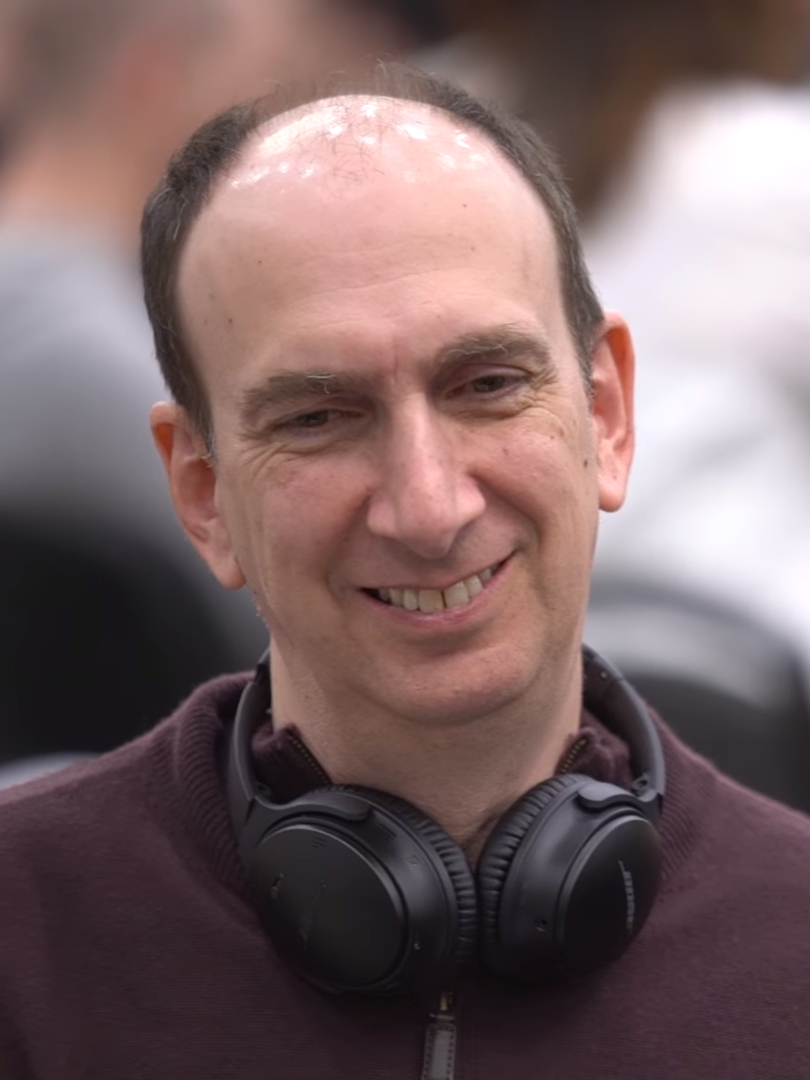
Erik Seidel the Event #1

- 2-Day Event: April 8-9
- Number of Entries: 116
- Total Prize Pool: $580,000
- Number of Payouts: 17
- Winning Hand: A♠ A♦

Final table
| Place | Name | Prize |
|---|---|---|
| 1 | (United States) Erik Seidel | $145,000 |
| 2 | (Canada) Eric Afriat | $89,900 |
| 3 | (United States) Dylan Linde | $63,800 |
| 4 | (United States) John Khoury | $49,300 |
| 5 | (United States) William Lamar-Boone | $37,700 |
| 6 | (United States) Justin Zaki | $29,000 |

=== Event #2: $10,000 No-Limit Hold'em ===
- 2-Day Event: April 9-10
- Number of Entries: 99
- Total Prize Pool: $990,000
- Number of Payouts: 15
- Winning Hand: 9♦ 7♦

Final table
| Place | Name | Prize |
|---|---|---|
| 1 | (United States) Jesse Lonis | $252,450 |
| 2 | (United States) Aram Zobian | $163,350 |
| 3 | (United States) Kristina Holst | $113,850 |
| 4 | (United States) Rodger Johnson | $89,100 |
| 5 | (United States) Joey Weissman | $64,350 |
| 6 | (United States) Victoria Livschitz | $49,500 |

=== Event #3: $10,000 No-Limit Hold'em ===
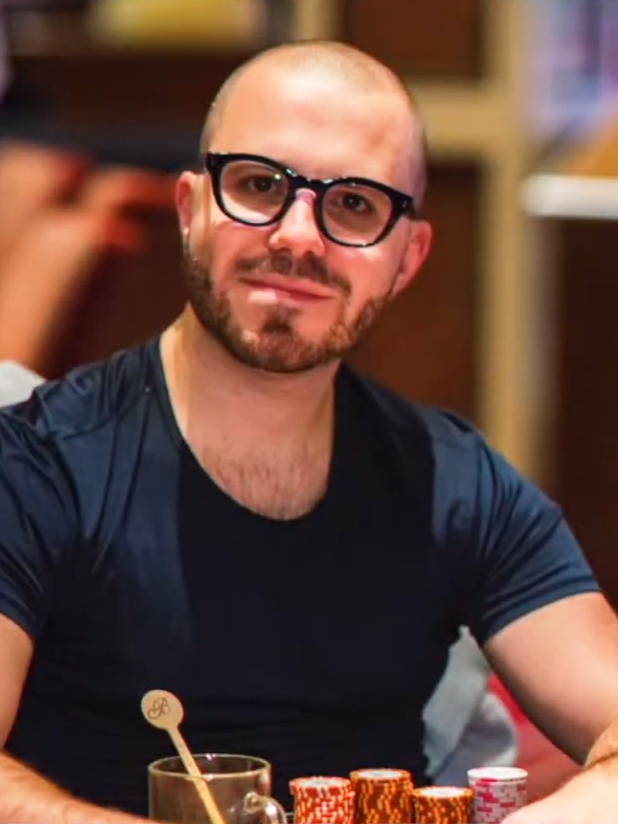
Dan Smith won his second USPO title on Event #3

- 2-Day Event: April 10-11
- Number of Entries: 84
- Total Prize Pool: $840,000
- Number of Payouts: 12
- Winning Hand: A♣ 9♥

Final table
| Place | Name | Prize |
|---|---|---|
| 1 | (United States) Dan Smith | $235,200 |
| 2 | (United States) Rodger Johnson | $151,200 |
| 3 | (United States) David Stamm | $109,200 |
| 4 | (Canada) Jesse Lonis | $79,800 |
| 5 | (United States) David Coleman | $58,800 |
| 6 | (United States) Dylan Linde | $42,000 |

=== Event #4: $10,000 No-Limit Hold'em ===
- 2-Day Event: April 11-12
- Number of Entries: 83
- Total Prize Pool: $830,000
- Number of Payouts: 12
- Winning Hand: K♠ J♠

Final table
| Place | Name | Prize |
|---|---|---|
| 1 | (United States) David Coleman | $202,300 |
| 2 | (United States) Shannon Shorr | $179,500 |
| 3 | (United States) Aram Zobian | $107,900 |
| 4 | (United States) Dylan Weisman | $78,850 |
| 5 | (United States) Phil Hellmuth | $58,100 |
| 6 | (United States) Jonathan Little | $41,500 |

=== Event #5: $10,100 No-Limit Hold'em ===
- 2-Day Event: April 12-13
- Number of Entries: 92
- Total Prize Pool: $920,000
- Number of Payouts: 14
- Winning Hand: K♣ 3♦

Final table
| Place | Name | Prize |
|---|---|---|
| 1 | (United States) Matthew Wantman | $239,200 |
| 2 | (Canada) Daniel Negreanu | $151,800 |
| 3 | (United States) Erik Seidel | $110,400 |
| 4 | (United States) Victoria Livschitz | $82,800 |
| 5 | (United States) Grant Wang | $64,400 |
| 6 | (United States) David Peters | $46,000 |

=== Event #6: $15,100 No-Limit Hold'em ===
- 3-Day Event: April 13-15
- Number of Entries: 62
- Total Prize Pool: $930,000
- Number of Payouts: 9
- Winning Hand: J♠ 10♠

Final table
| Place | Name | Prize |
|---|---|---|
| 1 | (United States) Aram Zobian | $264,290 |
| 2 | (United States) Samuel Laskowitz | $219,310 |
| 3 | (United States) Brock Wilson | $130,200 |
| 4 | (United States) Joey Weissman | $93,000 |
| 5 | (United States) Dan Shak | $69,750 |
| 6 | (United States) John Andress | $51,150 |

=== Event #7: $15,100 No-Limit Hold'em ===
- 2-Day Event: April 15-16
- Number of Entries: 64
- Total Prize Pool: $960,000
- Number of Payouts: 10
- Winning Hand: A♣ Q♣

Final table
| Place | Name | Prize |
|---|---|---|
| 1 | (Canada) Eric Afriat | $288,000 |
| 2 | (United States) Joey Weissman | $187,200 |
| 3 | (England) Stephen Chidwick | $129,600 |
| 4 | (United States) Samuel Laskowitz | $96,000 |
| 5 | (United States) Sean Winter | $72,000 |
| 6 | (United States) Bill Klein | $52,800 |

=== Event #8: $25,200 No-Limit Hold'em ===
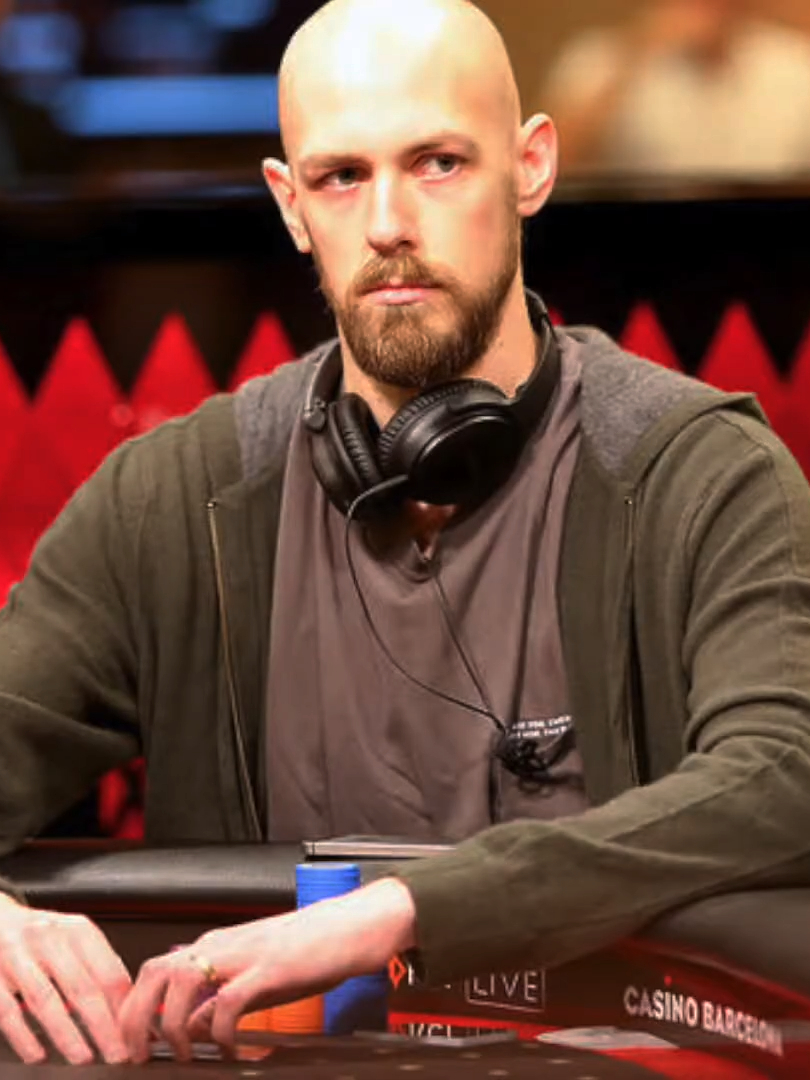
Event #8 champion Stephen Chidwick

- 2-Day Event: April 16-17
- Number of Entries: 52
- Total Prize Pool: $1,300,000
- Number of Payouts: 8
- Winning Hand: 8♥ 4♣

Final table
| Place | Name | Prize |
|---|---|---|
| 1 | (England) Stephen Chidwick | $429,000 |
| 2 | (United States) Andrew Lichtenberger | $273,000 |
| 3 | (United States) Brandon Wittmeyer | $182,000 |
| 4 | (United States) Dan Smith | $130,000 |
| 5 | (United States) Cary Katz | $104,000 |
| 6 | (United States) Aram Zobian | $78,000 |
