= 2023 U.S. Poker Open =

Series of poker tournaments

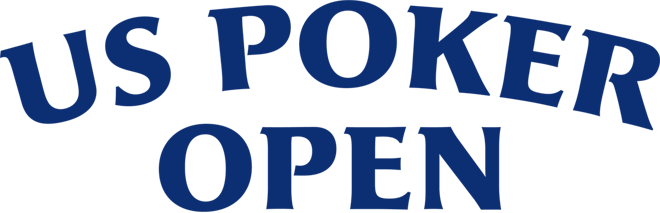
- Venue: PokerGO Studio at Aria Resort and Casino
- Location: Las Vegas, Nevada
- Dates: March 23 – April 5, 2023

Champion
- Martin Zamani (USPO winner) (Main Event winner)

The 2023 U.S. Poker Open was the fifth edition of the U.S. Poker Open, an annual series of high stakes poker tournaments held inside the PokerGO Studio in the Aria Resort and Casino in Las Vegas, Nevada. The series was held from March 23 – April 5 and featured ten events, culminating in the $50,000 No-Limit Hold'em main event.

Martin Zamani won the main event and cashed four times to earn the series championship, winning the Golden Eagle trophy and $50,000 bonus prize.

== Schedule ==
| # | Event | Entrants | Winner | Prize | Winning hand | Runner-up | Losing hand | Results |
|---|---|---|---|---|---|---|---|---|
| 1 | $10,000 No-Limit Hold'em | 105 | (United States) Joey Weissman | $231,000 | A♠ Q♣ | (United States) Justin Young | A♣ 7♦ | Results |
| 2 | $10,000 No-Limit Hold'em | 105 | (China) Ren Lin | $231,000 | A♠ 5♦ | (Argentina) Nacho Barbero | K♠ 7♠ | Results |
| 3 | $10,000 No-Limit Hold'em | 93 | (United States) Sam Soverel | $213,900 | K♠ Q♥ | (United States) Chris Brewer | 2♥ 2♦ | Results |
| 4 | $10,000 Pot-Limit Omaha | 77 | (United States) Allan Le | $200,200 | J♥ 8♦ 7♦ 7♥ | (Netherlands) Ronald Keijzer | K♦ Q♥ 9♦ 7♠ | Results |
| 5 | $10,000 No-Limit Hold'em | 88 | (United States) Phil Hellmuth | $221,200 | 6♣ 2♣ | (United States) Jeremy Ausmus | Q♣ 10♦ | Results |
| 6 | $15,000 Pot-Limit Omaha | 62 | (United States) Isaac Kempton | $279,000 | Q♠ 10♠ 9♥ 8♥ | (United States) Gregory Shuda | K♣ 7♥ 6♥ 2♣ | Results |
| 7 | $15,000 No-Limit Hold'em | 87 | (United States) Darren Elias | $313,200 | A♦ K♥ | (United States) Sam Soverel | 7♥ 7♦ | Results |
| 8 | $25,000 No-Limit Hold'em | 54 | (United States) Isaac Haxton | $423,000 | A♥ 4♥ | (United States) Joey Weissman | Q♥ 10♦ | Results |
| 9 | $25,000 No-Limit Hold'em | 47 | (United States) Dan Smith | $399,500 | J♣ 7♣ | (China) Ren Lin | A♠ 9♦ | Results |
| 10 | $50,000 No-Limit Hold'em | 37 | (United States) Martin Zamani | $666,000 | K♣ 6♥ | (United States) Nick Petrangelo | Q♠ 10♥ | Results |

== Series Leaderboard ==
Final Standings
| Rank | Name | Points | Earnings | Wins | Cashes |
|---|---|---|---|---|---|
| 1 | (United States) Martin Zamani | 570 | $835,800 | 1 | 4 |
| 2 | (China) Ren Lin | 465 | $568,400 | 1 | 4 |
| 3 | (United States) Sam Soverel | 457 | $456,750 | 1 | 3 |
| 4 | (United States) Joey Weissman | 442 | $736,500 | 1 | 3 |
| 5 | (United States) Darren Elias | 429 | $542,400 | 1 | 3 |

== Event results ==
=== Event #1: $10,000 No-Limit Hold'em ===
- 2-Day Event: March 23–24
- Number of Entries: 105
- Total Prize Pool: $1,050,000
- Number of Payouts: 15
- Winning Hand: A♠ Q♣

Final Table
| Place | Name | Prize |
|---|---|---|
| 1 | (United States) Joey Weissman | $231,000 |
| 2 | (United States) Justin Young | $168,000 |
| 3 | (United States) Andrew Moreno | $126,000 |
| 4 | (United States) Matthew McEwan | $99,750 |
| 5 | (Argentina) Nacho Barbero | $78,750 |
| 6 | (United States) Jonathan Little | $63,000 |

=== Event #2: $10,000 No-Limit Hold'em ===
- 2-Day Event: March 24–25
- Number of Entries: 105
- Total Prize Pool: $1,050,000
- Number of Payouts: 15
- Winning Hand: A♠ 5♦

Final Table
| Place | Name | Prize |
|---|---|---|
| 1 | (China) Ren Lin | $231,000 |
| 2 | (Argentina) Nacho Barbero | $168,000 |
| 3 | (United States) Robert Chorlian | $126,000 |
| 4 | (United States) Nate Silver | $99,750 |
| 5 | (United States) Aram Zobian | $78,750 |
| 6 | (United States) Erik Seidel | $63,000 |

=== Event #3: $10,000 No-Limit Hold'em ===
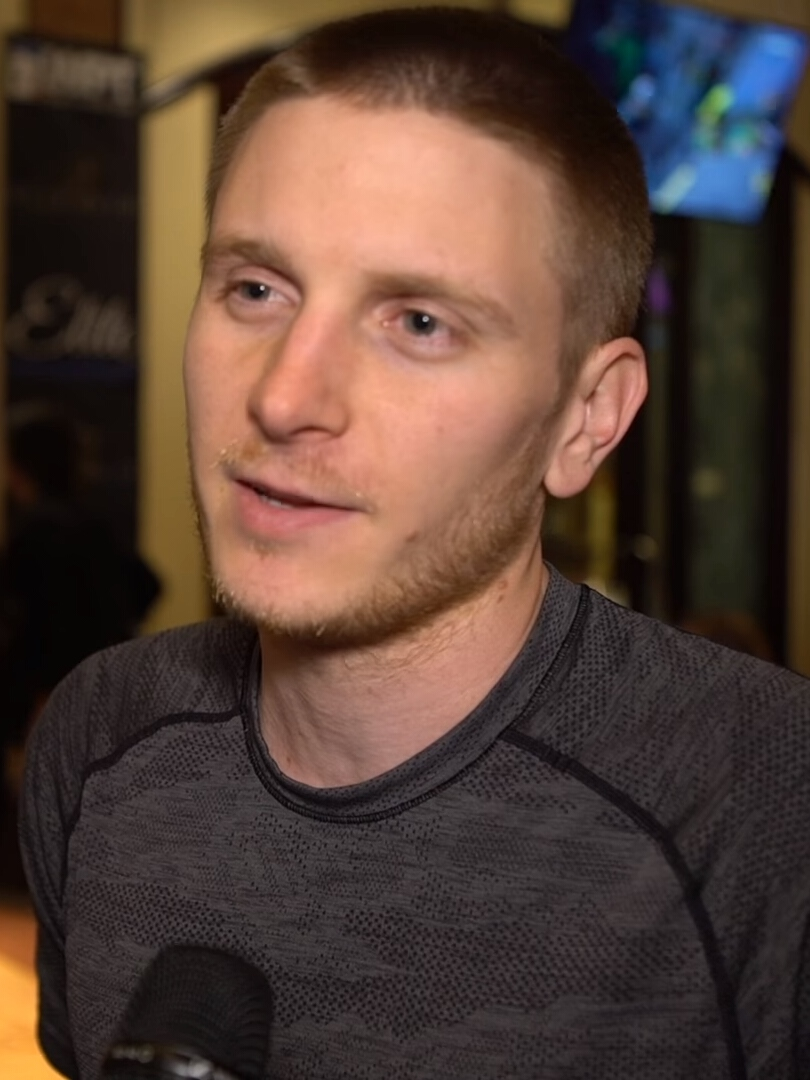
Sam Soverel won his second USPO title in Event #3

- 2-Day Event: March 25–27
- Number of Entries: 93
- Total Prize Pool: $930,000
- Number of Payouts: 14
- Winning Hand: K♠ Q♥

Final Table
| Place | Name | Prize |
|---|---|---|
| 1 | (United States) Sam Soverel | $213,900 |
| 2 | (United States) Chris Brewer | $148,800 |
| 3 | (United States) Brandon Wilson | $111,600 |
| 4 | (Canada) Kristen Foxen | $93,000 |
| 5 | (United States) Dan Colpoys | $74,400 |
| 6 | (Argentina) Nacho Barbero | $55,800 |

=== Event #4: $10,000 Pot-Limit Omaha ===
- 2-Day Event: March 27–28
- Number of Entries: 77
- Total Prize Pool: $770,000
- Number of Payouts: 11
- Winning Hand: J♥ 8♦ 7♦ 7♥

Final Table
| Place | Name | Prize |
|---|---|---|
| 1 | (United States) Allan Le | $200,200 |
| 2 | (Netherlands) Ronald Keijzer | $146,300 |
| 3 | (United States) Dylan Weisman | $100,100 |
| 4 | (Canada) Daniel Negreanu | $77,000 |
| 5 | (Serbia) Damjan Radanov | $61,600 |
| 6 | (Japan) Masashi Oya | $46,200 |

=== Event #5: $10,000 No-Limit Hold'em ===
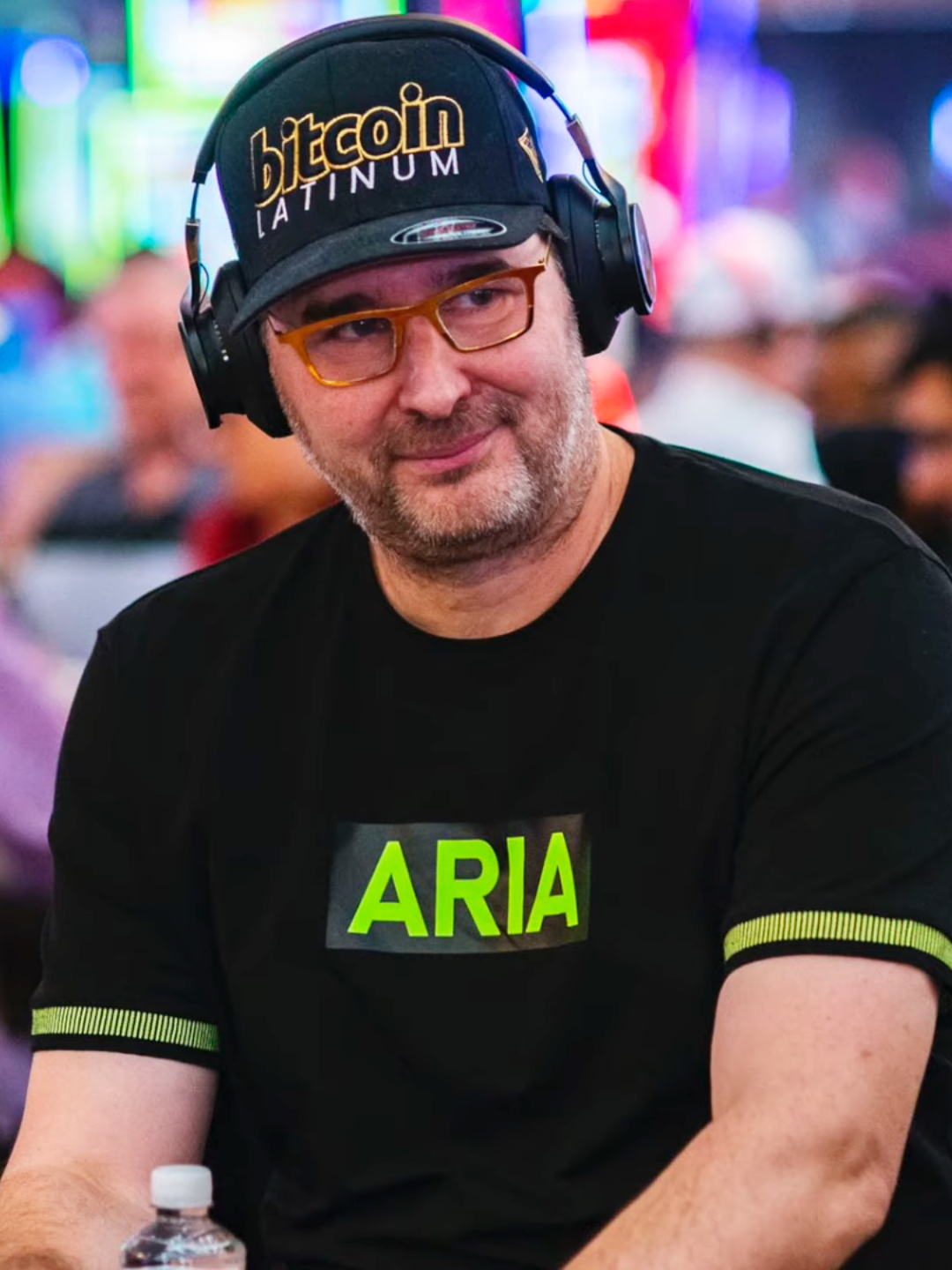
Phil Hellmuth made a straight flush to win Event #5

- 2-Day Event: March 28–29
- Number of Entries: 88
- Total Prize Pool: $880,000
- Number of Payouts: 13
- Winning Hand: 6♣ 2♣

Final Table
| Place | Name | Prize |
|---|---|---|
| 1 | (United States) Phil Hellmuth | $211,200 |
| 2 | (United States) Jeremy Ausmus | $149,600 |
| 3 | (United States) Jesse Lonis | $105,600 |
| 4 | (United States) George Wolff | $88,000 |
| 5 | (United States) Aram Oganyan | $70,400 |
| 6 | (United States) Allan Le | $52,800 |

=== Event #6: $15,000 Pot-Limit Omaha ===
- 2-Day Event: March 29–30
- Number of Entries: 62
- Total Prize Pool: $930,000
- Number of Payouts: 9
- Winning Hand: Q♠ 10♠ 9♥ 8♥

Final Table
| Place | Name | Prize |
|---|---|---|
| 1 | (United States) Isaac Kempton | $279,000 |
| 2 | (United States) Gregory Shuda | $186,000 |
| 3 | (United States) Martin Zamani | $130,200 |
| 4 | (United States) Ben Lamb | $93,000 |
| 5 | (Greece) Roussos Koliakoudakis | $74,400 |
| 6 | (United States) Erik Seidel | $55,800 |

=== Event #7: $15,000 No-Limit Hold'em ===
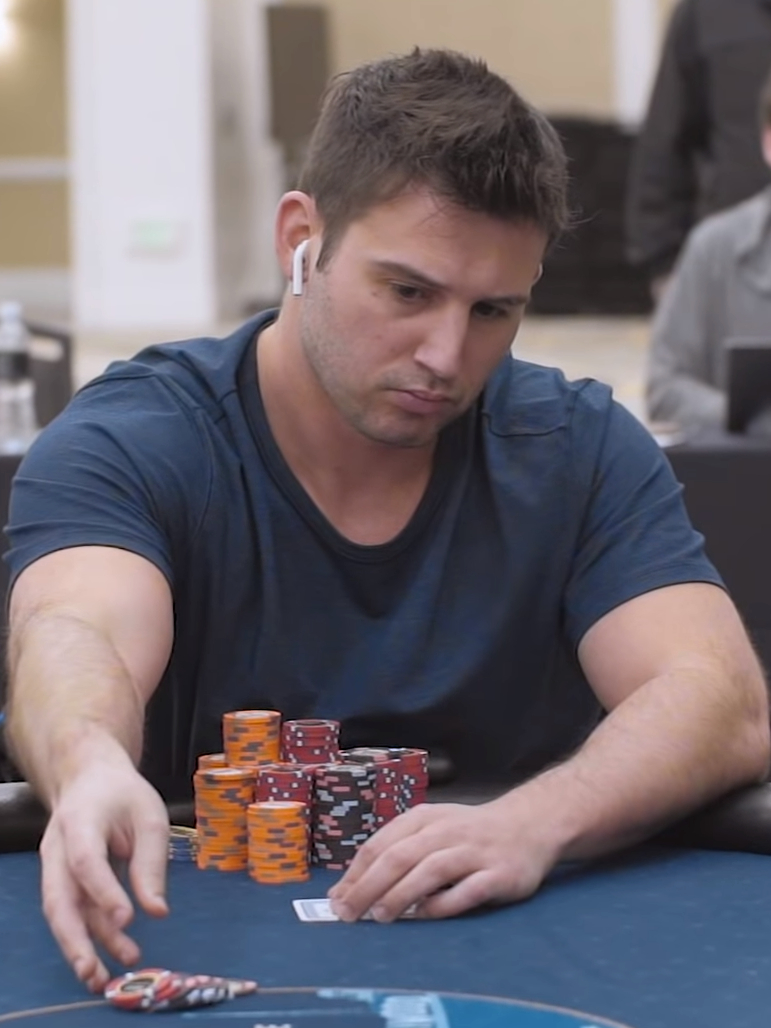
Event #7 champion Darren Elias

- 2-Day Event: March 30–31
- Number of Entries: 87
- Total Prize Pool: $1,305,000
- Number of Payouts: 13
- Winning Hand: A♦ K♥

Final Table
| Place | Name | Prize |
|---|---|---|
| 1 | (United States) Darren Elias | $313,200 |
| 2 | (United States) Sam Soverel | $221,850 |
| 3 | (United States) Brandon Wilson | $156,600 |
| 4 | (Japan) Masashi Oya | $130,500 |
| 5 | (United States) Sean Winter | $104,400 |
| 6 | (United States) Chris Brewer | $78,300 |

=== Event #8: $25,000 No-Limit Hold'em ===
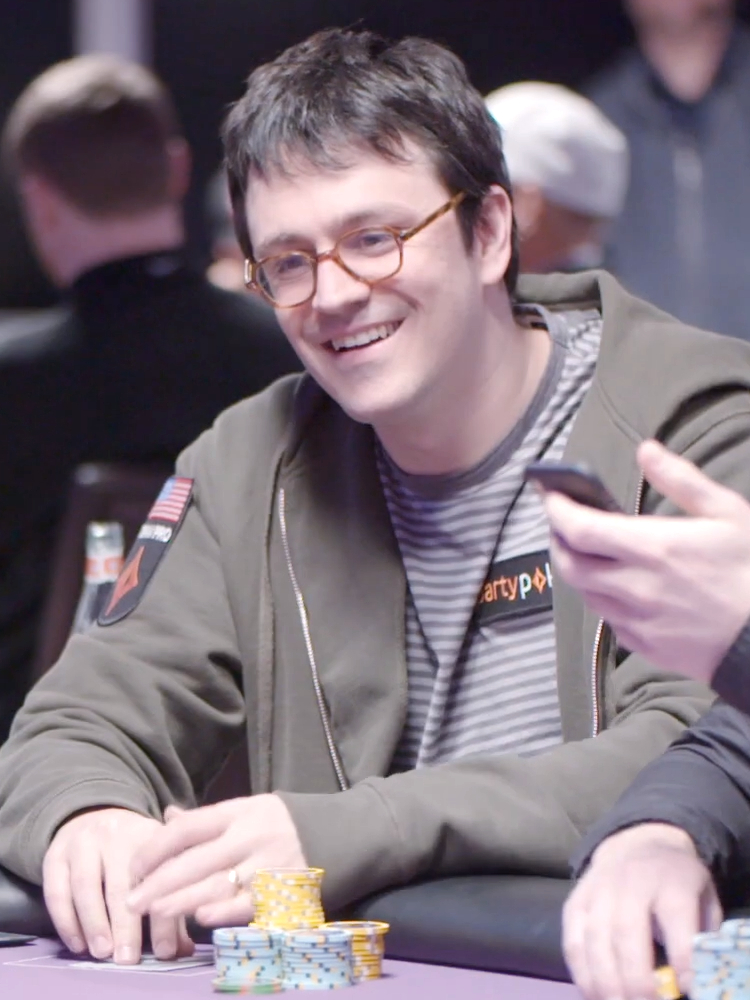
Event #8 champion Isaac Haxton

- 2-Day Event: March 31 – April 1
- Number of Entries: 54
- Total Prize Pool: $1,350,000
- Number of Payouts: 8
- Winning Hand: A♥ 4♥

Final Table
| Place | Name | Prize |
|---|---|---|
| 1 | (United States) Isaac Haxton | $423,000 |
| 2 | (United States) Joey Weissman | $283,500 |
| 3 | (United States) Dan Smith | $189,000 |
| 4 | (United States) Bill Klein | $135,000 |
| 5 | (United States) Phil Hellmuth | $108,000 |
| 6 | (United States) Alex Foxen | $81,000 |

=== Event #9: $25,000 No-Limit Hold'em ===
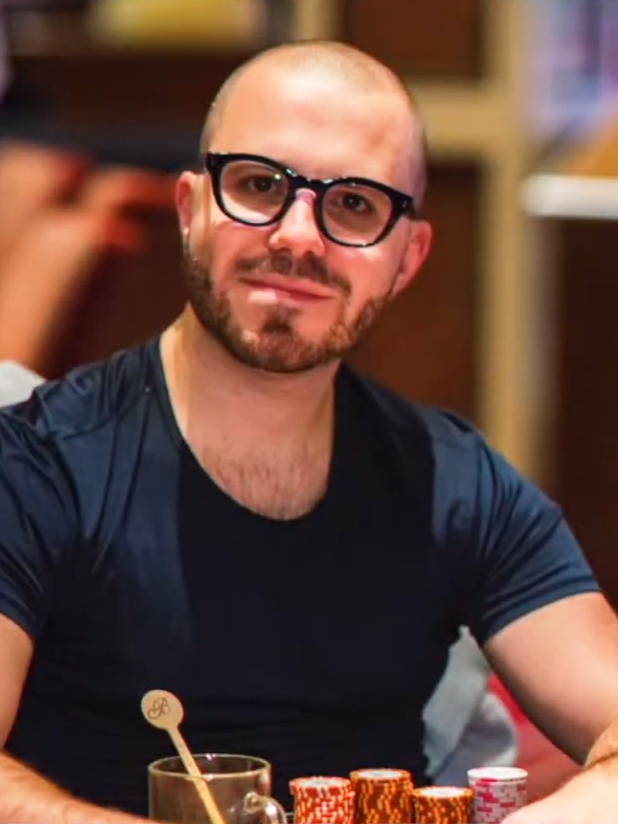
Dan Smith won Event #9 and made the final table of the main event

- 2-Day Event: April 1–3
- Number of Entries: 47
- Total Prize Pool: $1,175,000
- Number of Payouts: 7
- Winning Hand: J♣ 7♣

Final Table
| Place | Name | Prize |
|---|---|---|
| 1 | (United States) Dan Smith | $399,500 |
| 2 | (China) Ren Lin | $258,500 |
| 3 | (United States) Brian Kim | $176,250 |
| 4 | (United States) Cary Katz | $129,250 |
| 5 | (Thailand) Punnat Punsri | $94,000 |
| 6 | (United States) Nick Schulman | $70,500 |

=== Event #10: $50,000 No-Limit Hold'em ===
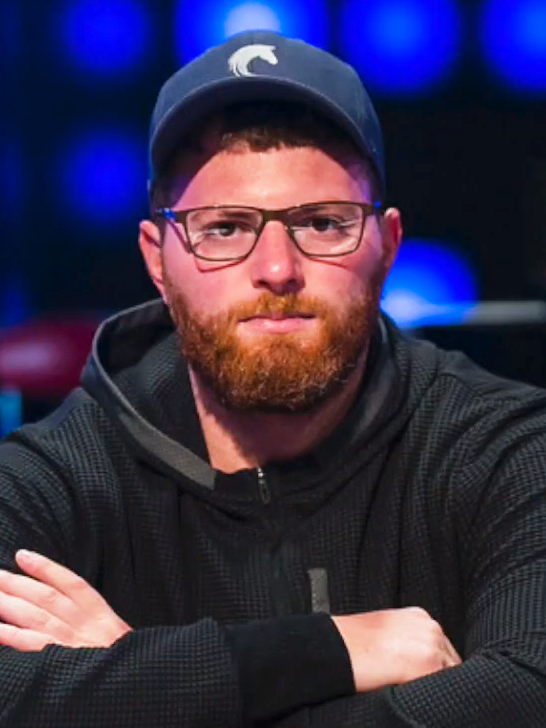
Nick Petrangelo finished runner-up to Martin Zamani in the main event

- 2-Day Event: April 3–4
- Number of Entries: 37
- Total Prize Pool: $1,850,000
- Number of Payouts: 6
- Winning Hand: K♣ 6♥

Final Table
| Place | Name | Prize |
|---|---|---|
| 1 | (United States) Martin Zamani | $666,000 |
| 2 | (United States) Nick Petrangelo | $444,000 |
| 3 | (United States) Jeremy Ausmus | $296,000 |
| 4 | (United States) Justin Bonomo | $203,500 |
| 5 | (United States) Dan Smith | $148,000 |
| 6 | (United States) Chris Brewer | $92,500 |
