= 2025 U.S. Poker Open =

Series of poker tournaments

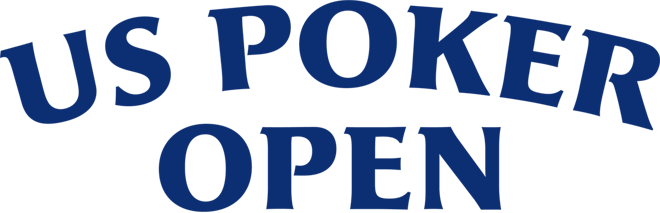
- Venue: PokerGO Studio at Aria Resort and Casino
- Location: Las Vegas, Nevada
- Dates: April 8-17, 2025

Champion
- (United States) Shannon Shorr (USPO winner) (Main Event winner)

The 2025 U.S. Poker Open was the seventh edition of the U.S. Poker Open, an annual series of high stakes poker tournaments held inside the PokerGO Studio in the Aria Resort and Casino in Las Vegas, Nevada. The series was held from April 8 – 17 and featured eight events, culminating in the $25,000 No-Limit Hold'em main event.

The 2025 U.S. Poker Open has crowned its newest champion, with Shannon Shorr topping the leaderboard to win the Golden Eagle trophy and a $25,000 PGT Passport. Shorr put on an impressive performance at the U.S. Poker Open by winning two events for a combined $749,650 in earnings. Shorr topped the 76-entrant field in Event #5: $10,100 No-Limit Hold'em to win $220,400, and followed that a few days later by topping the 73-entrant field in Event #8: $25,200 No-Limit Hold'em to win $529,250.

== Schedule ==
#	Event	Entrants	Winner	Prize	Winning hand	Runner-up	Losing hand	Results
1	$5,100 No-Limit Hold'em	129	(Canada) Kristen Foxen	$158,025	A♥ 7♥	(United States) Ping Liu	K♦ J♥	Results
2	$10,100 No-Limit Hold'em	99	(United States) Jesse Lonis	$252,450	9♦ 7♦	(United States) Aram Zobian	Q♦ 10♠	Results
3	$10,100 No-Limit Hold'em	109	(Italy) Michael Rossitto	$277,950	A♣ J♥	(United States) James Collopy	3♠ 3♣	Results
4	$10,100 No-Limit Hold'em	103	(United States) Matthew Wantman	$231,300	8♥ 7♥	(United States) Yifu He	Q♠ 6♠	Results
5	$10,100 No-Limit Hold'em	76	(United States) Shannon Shorr	$220,400	Q♣ 9♦	(United States) Eric Blair	A♠ 2♣	Results
6	$15,100 No-Limit Hold'em	98	(United States) Brandon Wilson	$382,200	5♦ 4♦	(United States) Matthew Wantman	J♦ 9♠	Results
7	$15,100 No-Limit Hold'em	681	(United States) William Foxen	$340,200	J♣ 9♦	(United States) Neil Warren	A♠ 10♣	Results
8	$25,200 No-Limit Hold'em	73	(United States) Shannon Shorr	$529,250	10♥ 6♥	(Argentina) Jose Ignacio Barbero	A♦ J♥	Results

== Series Leaderboard ==
Final Standings
Rank	Name	Points	Earnings	Wins	Cashes
1	(United States) Shannon Shorr	538	$749,650	2	2
2	(United States) Matthew Wantman	512	$528,350	1	3
3	(Argentina) Jose Ignacio Barbero	402	$540,150	0	3
4	(United States) Eric Blair	364	$385,725	0	6
5	(United States) Alex Foxen	354	$443,100	1	2

== Event results ==
=== Event #1: $5,100 No-Limit Hold'em ===
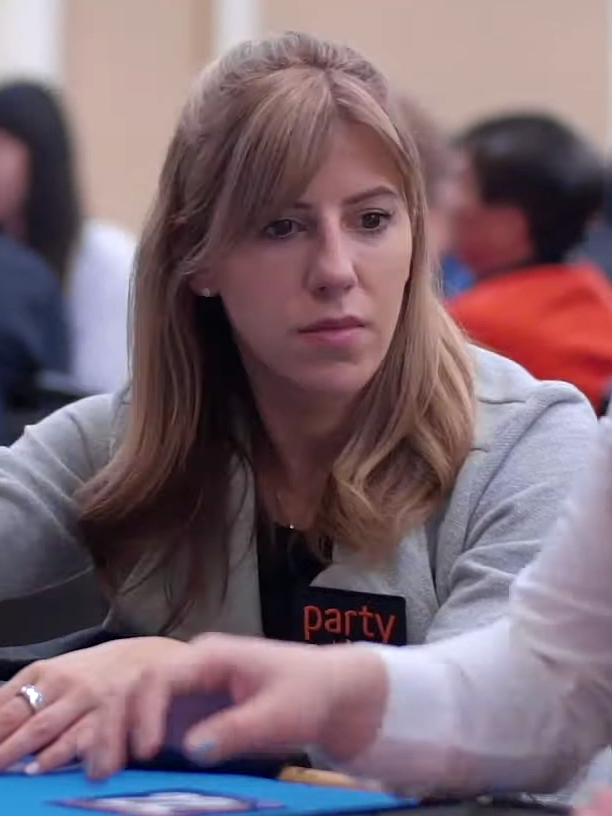
Kristen Foxen wins the Event #1

- 2-Day Event: April 8-9
- Number of Entries: 129
- Total Prize Pool: $645,000
- Number of Payouts: 19
- Winning Hand: A♥ 7♥

Final Table
Place	Name	Prize
1	(Canada) Kristen Foxen	$158,025
2	(United States) Ping Liu	$96,750
3	(United States) Francis Anderson	$70,950
4	(United States) Anthony Hu	$51,600
5	(United States) Michael Arellano	$38,700
6	(United States) David Peters	$32,250

=== Event #2: $10,100 No-Limit Hold'em ===
- 2-Day Event: April 9-10
- Number of Entries: 99
- Total Prize Pool: $990,000
- Number of Payouts: 15
- Winning Hand: 9♦ 7♦

Final Table
Place	Name	Prize
1	(United States) Jesse Lonis	$252,450
2	(United States) Aram Zobian	$163,350
3	(United States) Kristina Holst	$113,850
4	(United States) Rodger Johnson	$89,100
5	(United States) Joey Weissman	$64,350
6	(United States) Victoria Livschitz	$49,500

=== Event #3: $10,100 No-Limit Hold'em ===
- 2-Day Event: April 10-11
- Number of Entries: 109
- Total Prize Pool: $1,090,000
- Number of Payouts: 16
- Winning Hand: A♣ J♥

Final Table
Place	Name	Prize
1	(Italy) Michael Rossitto	$277,950
2	(United States) James Collopy	$174,400
3	(United States) Andrew Moreno	$125,350
4	(Venezuela) Christian Roberts	$98,100
5	(United States) Isaac Kempton	$70,850
6	(United States) Matthew Wantman	$54,500

=== Event #4: $10,100 No-Limit Hold'em ===
- 2-Day Event: April 11-12
- Number of Entries: 103
- Total Prize Pool: $1,030,000
- Number of Payouts: 15
- Winning Hand: 8♥ 7♥

Final Table
Place	Name	Prize
1	(United States) Matthew Wantman	$231,300
2	(United States) Yifu He	$201,300
3	(England) Stephen Chidwick	$118,450
4	(Japan) Masato Yokosawa	$92,700
5	(United States) Isaac Kempton	$66,950
6	(England) Patrick Leonard	$51,500

=== Event #5: $10,100 No-Limit Hold'em ===
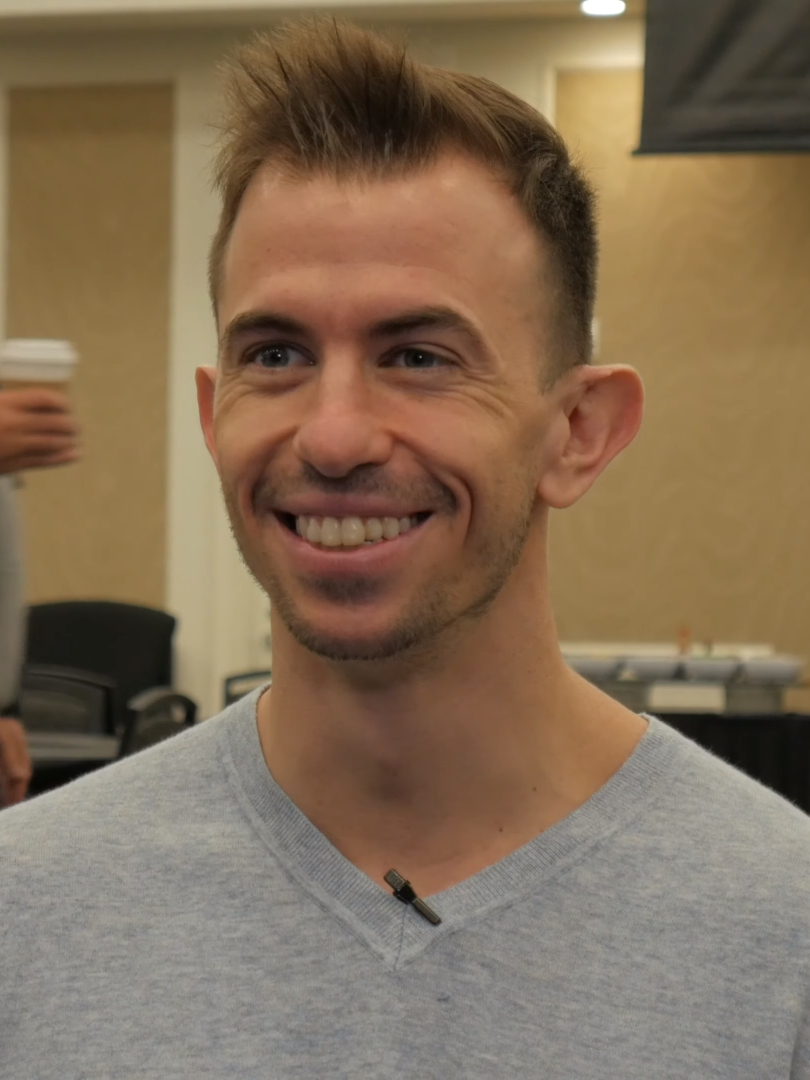
Event #5 champion Shannon Shorr

- 3-Day Event: April 12-14
- Number of Entries: 92
- Total Prize Pool: $760,000
- Number of Payouts: 11
- Winning Hand: Q♣ 9♦

Final Table
Place	Name	Prize
1	(United States) Shannon Shorr	$220,400
2	(United States) Eric Blair	$144,400
3	(United States) Yifu He	$102,600
4	(United States) Isaac Haxton	$72,200
5	(United States) Brock Wilson	$53,200
6	(United States) David Chen	$38,000

=== Event #6: $15,100 No Limit Hold'em ===
- 2-Day Event: April 14-15
- Number of Entries: 98
- Total Prize Pool: $1,470,000
- Number of Payouts: 14
- Winning Hand: 5♦ 4♦

Final Table
Place	Name	Prize
1	(United States) Brandon Wilson	$382,200
2	(United States) Matthew Wantman	$242,550
3	(United States) Sean Winter	$176,400
4	(United States) Martin Zamani	$132,300
5	(United States) William Foxen	$102,900
6	(United States) David Coleman	$73,500

=== Event #7: $15,100 No-Limit Hold'em ===
- 2-Day Event: April 15-16
- Number of Entries: 91
- Total Prize Pool: $1,215,000
- Number of Payouts: 12
- Winning Hand: J♣ 9♦

Final Table
Place	Name	Prize
1	(United States) William Foxen	$340,200
2	(United States) Neil Warren	$218,700
3	(United States) John Riordan	$157,950
4	(United States) Nicholas Seward	$115,425
5	(United States) Justin Zaki	$85,050
6	(United States) David Coleman	$60,750

=== Event #8: $25,200 No-Limit Hold'em ===
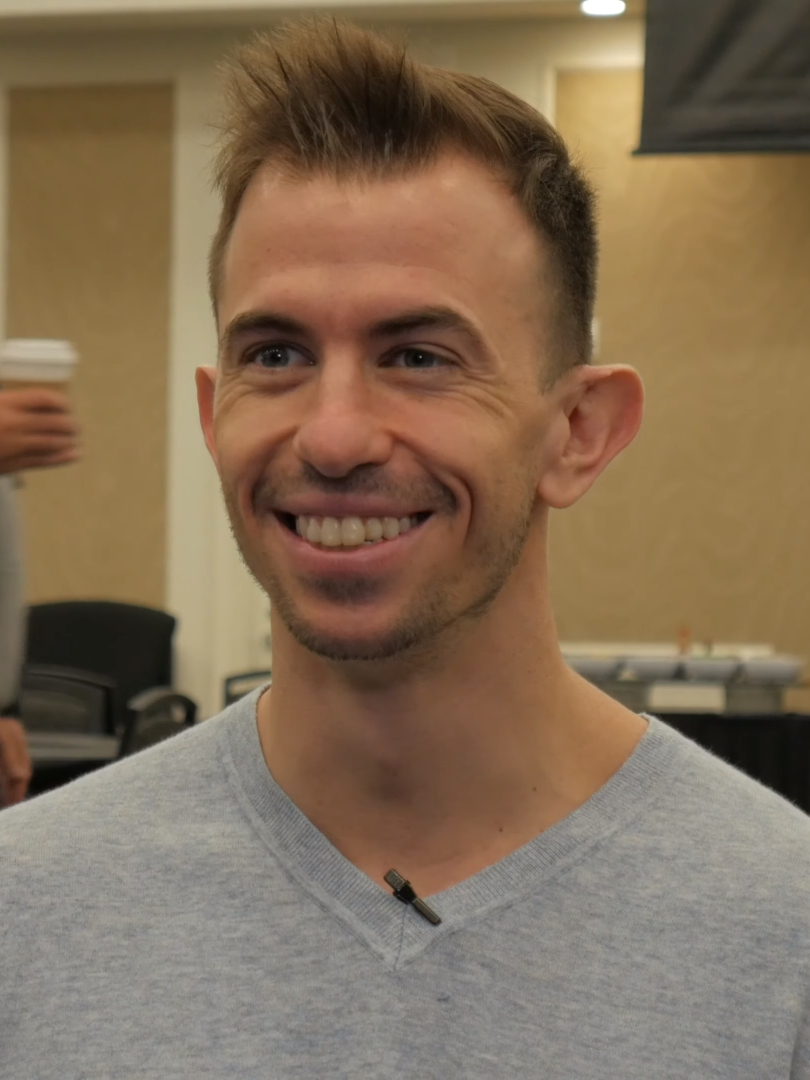
Event #8 champion Shannon Shorr

- 2-Day Event: April 16-17
- Number of Entries: 73
- Total Prize Pool: $1,825,000
- Number of Payouts: 11
- Winning Hand: 10♥ 6♥

Final Table
Place	Name	Prize
1	(United States) Shannon Shorr	$529,250
2	(Argentina) Jose Ignacio Barbero	$346,750
3	(United States) Landon Tice	$246,375
4	(United States) Nick Petrangelo	$173,375
5	(United States) Justin Saliba	$127,750
6	(United States) Samuel Laskowitz	$91,250
