= 2019 U.S. Poker Open =

Series of poker tournaments

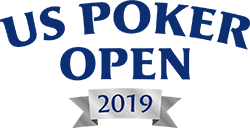
- Venue: PokerGO Studio at Aria Resort and Casino
- Location: Las Vegas, Nevada
- Dates: February 13–23, 2019

Champion
- (United States) David Peters (USPO Champion); (United States) David Peters (Main Event winner)

The 2019 U.S. Poker Open was the second season of the U.S. Poker Open, a series of high-stakes poker tournaments. It took place from February 13–23 at the Aria Resort and Casino in Las Vegas, Nevada. There were ten scheduled events with buy-ins ranging from $10,000 to $100,000. A short deck tournament was added to the schedule, while the buy-in for the Main Event was increased from $50,000 to $100,000.

Like the first season, the series was sponsored by Poker Central and all events were streamed live on PokerGO.

David Peters won both the Main Event for $1,320,000 and the $100,000 series championship with a total of one win and three final tables.

== Schedule ==
#	Event	Entrants	Winner	Prize	Winning hand	Runner-up	Losing hand	Results
1	$10,000 No Limit Hold'em	90	Stephen Chidwick	$216,000	7♦ 5♦	Sean Winter	8♦ 8♣	Results
2	$10,000 Pot Limit Omaha	64	Jordan Cristos	$179,200	K♣ 9♠ 6♥ 5♣	Manig Löser	Q♦ 10♣ 7♦ 4♣	Results
3	$10,000 No Limit Hold'em	91	Lauren Roberts	$218,400	A♣ 4♦	Koray Aldemir	Q♣ 3♥	Results
4	$10,000 Short Deck	42	Sean Winter	$151,200	K♣ 9♣	David Peters	J♦ 9♠	Results
5	$25,000 No Limit Hold'em	59	Ali Imsirovic	$442,500	9♣ 6♠	Cary Katz	K♣ 5♣	Results
6	$25,000 Pot Limit Omaha	39	Stephen Chidwick	$351,000	A♠ 10♣ 8♠ 4♥	Cary Katz	A♣ J♠ J♦ 3♦	Results
7	$25,000 No Limit Hold'em	60	Bryn Kenney	$450,000	K♦ J♣	Jake Schindler	A♣ 7♦	Results
8	$25,000 Eight-Game Mix	20	Nick Schulman	$270,000	K♥ 10♣	Brandon Adams	9♦ 2♠	Results
9	$50,000 No Limit Hold'em	41	Koray Aldemir	$738,000	K♣ Q♥	Ryan Riess	K♥ 7♠	Results
10	$100,000 No Limit Hold'em Main Event	33	David Peters	$1,320,000	9♦ 9♣	Chris Hunichen	A♥ 8♣	Results

== Series leaderboard ==
Standings
Rank	Name	Points	Earnings
1	(United States) David Peters	550	$1,584,000
2	(United States) Sean Winter	540	$747,900
3	(United Kingdom) Stephen Chidwick	540	$705,950
4	(United States) Nick Schulman	410	$390,000
5	(United States) Brandon Adams	365	$314,750

== Results ==
=== Event #1: $10,000 No Limit Hold'em ===
- 2-Day Event: February 13–14
- Number of Entries: 90
- Total Prize Pool: $900,000
- Number of Payouts: 13
- Winning Hand: 7♦ 5♦

Final Table
Place	Name	Prize
1st	Stephen Chidwick	$216,000
2nd	Sean Winter	$157,000
3rd	Joseph Cheong	$112,500
4th	Joseph Cappello	$90,000
5th	Lazaro Hernandez	$72,000
6th	Joseph Orsino	$54,000

=== Event #2: $10,000 Pot Limit Omaha ===
- 2-Day Event: February 14–15
- Number of Entries: 64
- Total Prize Pool: $640,000
- Number of Payouts: 10
- Winning Hand: K♣ 9♠ 6♥ 5♣

Final Table
Place	Name	Prize
1st	Jordan Cristos	$179,200
2nd	Manig Löser	$128,000
3rd	Martin Zamani	$83,200
4th	Adam Hendrix	$64,000
5th	Cary Katz	$51,200
6th	Sean Winter	$38,400

=== Event #3: $10,000 No Limit Hold'em ===
- 2-Day Event: February 15–16
- Number of Entries: 91
- Total Prize Pool: $910,000
- Number of Payouts: 13
- Winning Hand: A♣ 4♦

Final Table
Place	Name	Prize
1st	Lauren Roberts	$218,400
2nd	Koray Aldemir	$159,250
3rd	Stephen Chidwick	$113,750
4th	Brandon Adams	$91,000
5th	Sean Winter	$72,800
6th	Ralph Wong	$54,600

=== Event #4: $10,000 Short Deck ===
- 2-Day Event: February 16–17
- Number of Entries: 42
- Total Prize Pool: $419,900
- Number of Payouts: 6
- Winning Hand: K♣ 9♣

Final Table
Place	Name	Prize
1st	Sean Winter	$151,200
2nd	David Peters	$100,800
3rd	Seth Davies	$67,200
4th	Ben Lamb	$42,000
5th	Ben Yu	$33,600
6th	Stephen Chidwick	$25,200

=== Event #5: $25,000 No Limit Hold'em ===
- 2-Day Event: February 17–18
- Number of Entries: 59
- Total Prize Pool: $1,475,000
- Number of Payouts: 9
- Winning Hand: 9♣ 6♠

Final Table
Place	Name	Prize
1st	Ali Imsirovic	$442,500
2nd	Cary Katz	$295,000
3rd	Dan Shak	$206,500
4th	Nick Petrangelo	$147,500
5th	Kristen Bicknell	$118,000
6th	Joseph Cappello	$88,500

=== Event #6: $25,000 Pot Limit Omaha ===
- 2-Day Event: February 18–19
- Number of Entries: 39
- Total Prize Pool: $975,000
- Number of Payouts: 6
- Winning Hand: A♠ 10♣ 8♠ 4♥

Final Table
Place	Name	Prize
1st	Stephen Chidwick	$351,000
2nd	Cary Katz	$234,000
3rd	Tom Marchese	$156,000
4th	Ben Lamb	$97,500
5th	Sean Rafael	$78,000
6th	Anthony Zinno	$58,500

=== Event #7: $25,000 No Limit Hold'em ===
- 2-Day Event: February 19–20
- Number of Entries: 60
- Total Prize Pool: $1,500,000
- Number of Payouts: 9
- Winning Hand: K♦ J♣

Final Table
Place	Name	Prize
1st	Bryn Kenney	$450,000
2nd	Jake Schindler	$300,000
3rd	Ben Yu	$210,000
4th	Keith Tilston	$150,000
5th	Nick Schulman	$120,000
6th	Nick Petrangelo	$90,000

=== Event #8: $25,000 Mixed Game ===
- 2-Day Event: February 20–21
- Number of Entries: 20
- Total Prize Pool: $500,000
- Number of Payouts: 3
- Winning Hand: K♥ 10♣ (Limit Hold'em)

Final Table
Place	Name	Prize
1st	Nick Schulman	$270,000
2nd	Brandon Adams	$150,000
3rd	Chris Vitch	$80,000

=== Event #9: $50,000 No Limit Hold'em ===
- 2-Day Event: February 21–22
- Number of Entries: 41
- Total Prize Pool: $2,050,000
- Number of Payouts: 6
- Winning Hand: K♣ Q♥

Final Table
Place	Name	Prize
1st	Koray Aldemir	$738,000
2nd	Ryan Riess	$492,000
3rd	Sean Winter	$328,000
4th	Alex Foxen	$205,000
5th	David Peters	$164,000
6th	Seth Davies	$123,000

=== Event #10: $100,000 No Limit Hold'em Main Event ===
- 2-Day Event: February 22–23
- Number of Entries: 33
- Total Prize Pool: $3,300,000
- Number of Payouts: 5
- Winning Hand: 9♦ 9♣

Final Table
Place	Name	Prize
1st	David Peters	$1,320,000
2nd	Chris Hunichen	$858,000
3rd	Keith Tilston	$528,000
4th	Martin Zamani	$330,000
5th	Ryan Riess	$264,000
