= Jörg J. Kühn =

German architect and professor (born 1952)

Jörg J. Kühn (born 1 July 1952, in Rennerod, Germany) is a German architect and professor.

== Life and career ==
Jörg Kühn studied Architecture (Sociology as minor subject) at the Technische Hochschule Darmstadt (THD) under teachers such as Günter Behnisch, Walter Belz and Max Bächer. He graduated in 1980 with Helmut Striffler as his supervisor. After his graduation he worked as assistant professor at Helmut Stiffler's chair until 1985, followed by a position as lecturer for building construction and architectural design at the chairs of Walter Belz and Peter Steiger. In 1993 he became professor at the chair of design and building science at Brandenburg University of Technology (BTU) in Cottbus where he is teaching both bachelor and master students at the faculty for architecture, civil engineering and urban planning, and the international postgraduate programme "World Heritage Studies". In the years from 1996 to 2000 he supervised the construction measures for the extension of the BTU campus premises in Juri-Gagarin-Straße as vice-president for planning and finances. During that time the IKMZ (Informations-, Kommunikations- und Medienzentrum) - the campus library - was built by the renowned Swiss office Herzog & de Meuron. As a member of the rectorate, the university council, the senate and the curatorium of Brandenburg University of Technology, Kühn significantly influenced the university's expansion and development. He held visiting professorships at the Politecnico di Milano in Italy and the Saint-Petersburg State University of Architecture and Civil Engineering. By the latter he was awarded an honorary doctorate in 1996. He is actively engaged with the rheinkolleg e.v. in Speyer.

== Work ==
Since 1982 Jörg Kühn runs his own architectural office in Darmstadt, Germany, and collaborated with architects including Juha Leiviskä from Finland. His work includes prison buildings with a focus on humane penitentiary, administration buildings as well as revitalisation and construction projects in existing built contexts. He also works in the fields of furniture and industrial design (office interiors and trading areas for banks and stock-exchange buildings. Jörg Kühn is active as an expert judge in architectural and urban-planning competitions.

== Buildings (selection) ==
- 1987: Trading floor Chemical Bank in Tokyo
- 1992: Michael Conrad & Leo Burnett, Chicago, Advertising, German Branch, Frankfurt/Main
- 1993: Penitentiary Weiterstadt/Hessen (partner in Architekten-Forum)
- 1998: Company headquarters DAW /Caparol, Ober-Ramstadt (project in collaboration with Juha Leiviskä)
- 2001: Penitentiary Cottbus/Brandenburg
- 2004: Revitalisation of a monastery in the Lago Maggiore region in Italy
- 2005: Abu Dhabi State Prison (international competition)
- 2010: Revitalisation of a manor-house in Forst/Pfalz
