= U.S. Poker Open =

Series of poker tournaments

- Current season, competition or edition: 2025 U.S. Poker Open
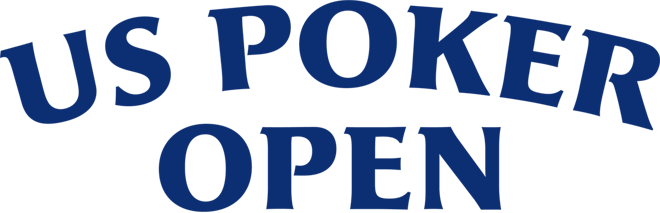
- Sport: Poker
- Founded: February 2018
- Owner: World Poker Tour
- CEO: Adam Pliska
- Director: Tim Duckworth
- Country: United States
- Venue: PokerGO Studio at Aria Resort and Casino
- Most recent champions: (United States) Shannon Shorr (Main Event winner); (Series champion)
- Most titles: (United Kingdom) Stephen Chidwick (6)
- Sponsor: PokerGO
- Website: USPO.com

The U.S. Poker Open is a series of high-stakes poker tournaments. Created in 2018, it takes place at the Aria Resort and Casino in Las Vegas, Nevada, and all final tables are streamed live on PokerGO. In addition to the Main Event, the player who accumulates the most points during the series wins $50,000.

The debut season took place with eight events in February 2018. Keith Tilston won the $50,000 Main Event, while Stephen Chidwick earned series champion honors by winning two events and making five final tables. For the second season in February 2019, the buy-in for the Main Event was increased to $100,000 and a Short Deck variant was added to the schedule.

After not being held in 2020 due to the COVID-19 pandemic, the series returned for its third edition in June 2021. In addition to the $50,000 prize, the series champion will now receive a Golden Eagle trophy. David Peters won three events to earn the series championship for the second consecutive time.

Sean Winter, after being runner-up to Peters in the previous two U.S. Poker Opens, won the final two events of the 2022 series including the $50,000 Main Event for the second straight year to earn the series championship.

== Series champions ==
Information correct as of April 27, 2025

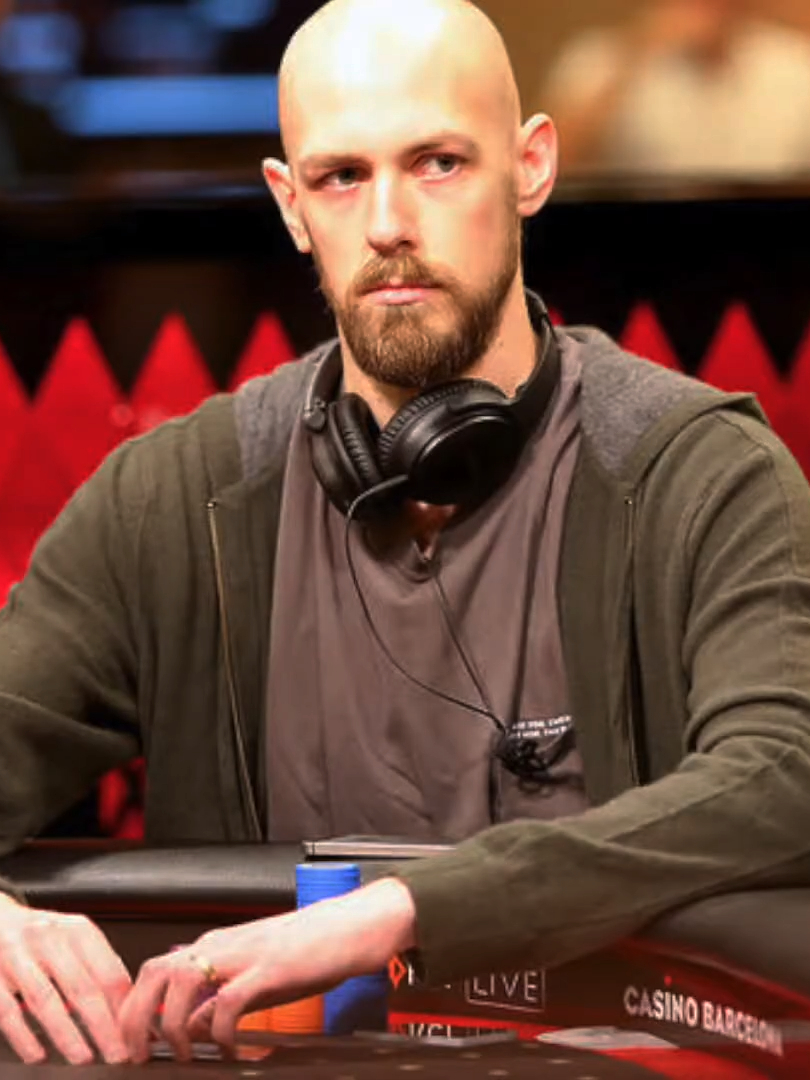
Stephen Chidwick won the inaugural series in 2018

Year	Events	Winner	Wins	Final tables	Cashes	Earnings (US$)	Runner-up
2018	8	(United Kingdom) Stephen Chidwick	2	5	5	$1,256,650	(United States) Keith Tilston
2019	10	(United States) David Peters	1	3	3	$1,584,800	(United States) Sean Winter
2021	12	(United States) David Peters	3	3	4	$832,950	(United States) Sean Winter
2022	12	(United States) Sean Winter	2	2	2	$1,196,000	(Japan) Tamon Nakamura
2023	10	(United States) Martin Zamani	1	2	4	$835,800	(China) Ren Lin
2024	8	(United States) Aram Zobian	1	4	4	$613,540	(United Kingdom) Stephen Chidwick
2025	8	(United States) Shannon Shorr	2	2	2	$749,650	(United States) Matthew Wantman

== Main Event winners ==
Information correct as of April 27, 2025

Year	Entrants	Winner	Winning hand	Prize (US$)	Runner-up	Losing hand
2018	33	(United States) Keith Tilston	K♥ 4♥	$660,000	(United States) Jake Schindler	8♠ 7♥
2019	33	(United States) David Peters	9♦ 9♣	$1,320,000	(United States) Chris Hunichen	A♥ 8♣
2021	42	(United States) Sean Winter	10♣ 6♣	$756,000	(United Kingdom) Stephen Chidwick	Q♠ 4♣
2022	42	(United States) Sean Winter	A♠ 6♣	$756,000	(Japan) Masashi Oya	Q♠ Q♣
2023	37	(United States) Martin Zamani	K♣ 6♥	$666,000	(United States) Nick Petrangelo	Q♠ 10♥
2024	52	(United Kingdom) Stephen Chidwick	8♥ 4♣	$429,000	(United States) Andrew Lichtenberger	3♠ 3♣
2025	73	(United States) Shannon Shorr	10♥ 6♥	$529,250	(Argentina) Jose Ignacio Barbero	A♦ J♥

== Event wins ==
Information correct as of April 4, 2023

Wins	Player
5	(United States) David Peters
4	(United Kingdom) Stephen Chidwick
4	(United States) Sean Winter
2	(Bosnia and Herzegovina) Ali Imsirovic
2	(Japan) Tamon Nakamura
2	(United States) Sam Soverel
2	(United States) Joey Weissman
