= 2018 U.S. Poker Open =

Series of poker tournaments

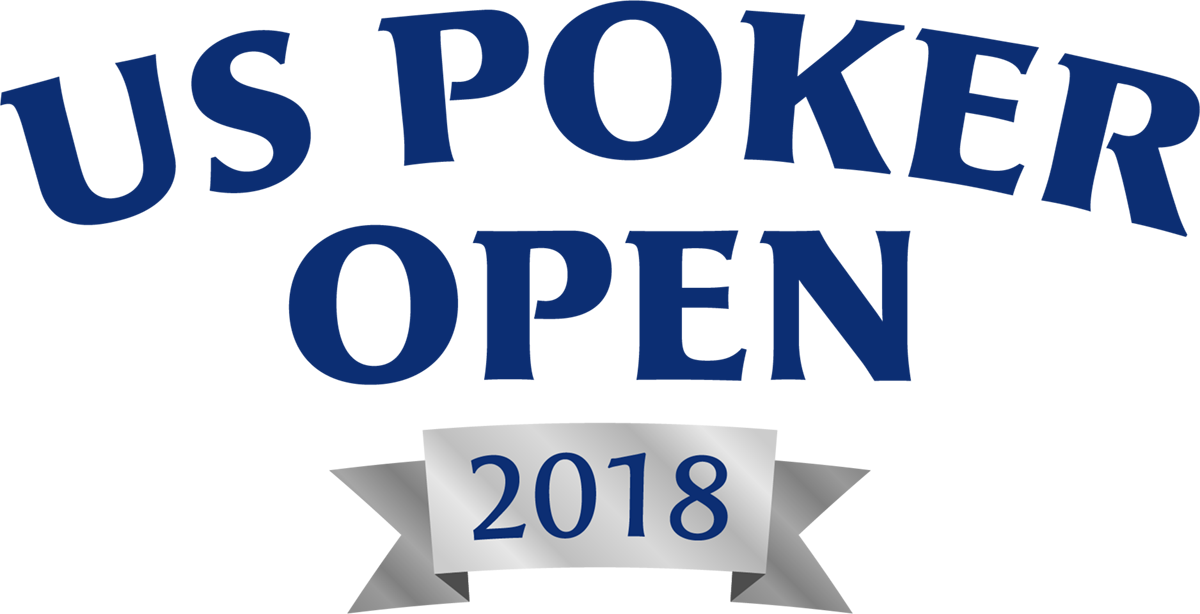
- Venue: Aria Resort and Casino
- Location: Las Vegas, Nevada
- Dates: February 1–11, 2018

Champion
- (United Kingdom) Stephen Chidwick (USPO Champion); (United States) Keith Tilston (Main Event winner)

The 2018 U.S. Poker Open was the inaugural season of the U.S. Poker Open. It took place from February 1–11 at the Aria Resort and Casino in Las Vegas, Nevada. Poker Central sponsored the event, with every final table streamed live on PokerGo. There were eight events, including Pot Limit Omaha and Mixed Game tournaments, with buy-ins ranging between $10,000 and $50,000. It culminated in the $50,000 No Limit Hold'em Main Event.

Stephen Chidwick won the series championship, winning two events and making the final table of five out of eight events. Keith Tilston won the Main Event.

== Schedule ==
| # | Event | Entrants | Winner | Prize | Winning hand | Runner-up | Losing hand | Results |
|---|---|---|---|---|---|---|---|---|
| 1 | $10,000 No Limit Hold'em | 68 | Justin Bonomo | $190,400 | K♣ 7♥ | Boutros Naim | 8♣ 5♣ | Results |
| 2 | $10,000 Pot Limit Omaha | 64 | Mike Gorodinsky | $179,200 | A♠ 10♣ 7♠ 7♥ | Richard Kirsch | A♣ K♠ 6♠ 4♣ | Results |
| 3 | $25,000 No Limit Hold'em | 44 | Stephen Chidwick | $374,000 | A♦ 3♣ | Keith Tilston | K♠ 9♣ | Results |
| 4 | $25,000 Mixed Game Championship | 45 | Stephen Chidwick | $382,500 | K♠ J♥ 7♦ 5♣ 3♦ | Chris Vitch | 6♠ 6♦ 5♥ 4♥ 2♠ | Results |
| 5 | $10,000 No Limit Hold'em | 67 | Ben Tollerene | $187,600 | A♠ A♣ | Jake Schindler | Q♣ 9♣ | Results |
| 6 | $25,000 No Limit Hold'em | 49 | Benjamin Pollak | $416,500 | A♠ 3♠ | Jason Koon | K♣ 5♣ | Results |
| 7 | $25,000 No Limit Hold'em | 50 | David Peters | $400,000 | A♠ A♥ | Stephen Chidwick | Q♣ 2♠ | Results |
| 8 | $50,000 No Limit Hold'em Main Event | 33 | Keith Tilston | $660,000 | K♥ 4♥ | Jake Schindler | 8♠ 7♥ | Results |

== Series leaderboard ==
Standings
| Rank | Name | Earnings |
|---|---|---|
| 1 | (United Kingdom) Stephen Chidwick | $1,256,600 |
| 2 | (United States) Keith Tilston | $1,047,100 |
| 3 | (United States) Jake Schindler | $693,400 |
| 4 | (Canada) Daniel Negreanu | $621,500 |
| 5 | (France) Benjamin Pollak | $554,600 |

== Results ==
=== Event #1: $10,000 No Limit Hold'em ===
- 2-Day Event: February 1–2
- Number of Entries: 68
- Total Prize Pool: $680,000
- Number of Payouts: 10
- Winning Hand: K♣ 7♥

Final Table
| Place | Name | Prize |
|---|---|---|
| 1st | Justin Bonomo | $190,400 |
| 2nd | Boutros Naim | $136,000 |
| 3rd | David Peters | $88,400 |
| 4th | Justin Young | $68,000 |
| 5th | Stephen Chidwick | $54,400 |
| 6th | Sam Soverel | $40,800 |

=== Event #2: $10,000 Pot Limit Omaha ===
- 2-Day Event: February 2–3
- Number of Entries: 64
- Total Prize Pool: $640,000
- Number of Payouts: 10
- Winning Hand: A♠ 10♣ 7♠ 7♥

Final Table
| Place | Name | Prize |
|---|---|---|
| 1st | Mike Gorodinsky | $179,200 |
| 2nd | Richard Kirsch | $128,000 |
| 3rd | Rainer Kempe | $83,200 |
| 4th | Anthony Zinno | $64,000 |
| 5th | Andjelko Andrejevic | $51,200 |
| 6th | Cary Katz | $38,400 |

=== Event #3: $25,000 No Limit Hold'em ===
- 2-Day Event: February 3–4
- Number of Entries: 44
- Total Prize Pool: $1,100,000
- Number of Payouts: 7
- Winning Hand: A♦ 3♣

Final Table
| Place | Name | Prize |
|---|---|---|
| 1st | Stephen Chidwick | $374,000 |
| 2nd | Keith Tilston | $242,000 |
| 3rd | Daniel Negreanu | $165,000 |
| 4th | Jake Schindler | $110,000 |
| 5th | Brent Hanks | $88,000 |
| 6th | Seth Davies | $66,000 |

=== Event #4: $25,000 Mixed Game Championship ===
- 2-Day Event: February 5–6
- Number of Entries: 45
- Total Prize Pool: $1,125,000
- Number of Payouts: 7
- Winning Hand: K♠ J♥ 7♦ 5♣ 3♦ (2-7 Triple Draw)

Final Table
| Place | Name | Prize |
|---|---|---|
| 1st | Stephen Chidwick | $382,500 |
| 2nd | Chris Vitch | $247,500 |
| 3rd | Isaac Haxton | $168,750 |
| 4th | Benjamin Pollak | $112,500 |
| 5th | Dan Shak | $90,000 |
| 6th | Phil Hellmuth | $67,500 |

=== Event #5: $10,000 No Limit Hold'em ===
- 2-Day Event: February 6–7
- Number of Entries: 67
- Total Prize Pool: $670,000
- Number of Payouts: 10
- Winning Hand: A♠ A♣

Final Table
| Place | Name | Prize |
|---|---|---|
| 1st | Ben Tollerene | $187,600 |
| 2nd | Jake Schindler | $134,000 |
| 3rd | Ryan Riess | $87,100 |
| 4th | Cary Katz | $67,000 |
| 5th | Kristina Holst | $53,600 |
| 6th | Rodger Johnson | $40,200 |

=== Event #6: $25,000 No Limit Hold'em ===
- 2-Day Event: February 7–8
- Number of Entries: 49
- Total Prize Pool: $1,225,000
- Number of Payouts: 7
- Winning Hand: A♠ 3♠

Final Table
| Place | Name | Prize |
|---|---|---|
| 1st | Benjamin Pollak | $416,500 |
| 2nd | Jason Koon | $269,500 |
| 3rd | Stephen Chidwick | $183,750 |
| 4th | Isaac Haxton | $122,500 |
| 5th | Brian Green | $98,000 |
| 6th | Elijah Berg | $73,500 |

=== Event #7: $25,000 No Limit Hold'em ===
- 2-Day Event: February 8–9
- Number of Entries: 50
- Total Prize Pool: $1,249,500
- Number of Payouts: 8
- Winning Hand: A♠ A♥

Final Table
| Place | Name | Prize |
|---|---|---|
| 1st | David Peters | $400,000 |
| 2nd | Stephen Chidwick | $262,000 |
| 3rd | Sean Winter | $175,000 |
| 4th | Keith Tilston | $125,000 |
| 5th | Ben Tollerene | $100,000 |
| 6th | Daniel Negreanu | $75,000 |

=== Event #8: $50,000 No Limit Hold'em Main Event ===
- 3-Day Event: February 9–11
- Number of Entries: 33
- Total Prize Pool: $1,650,000
- Number of Payouts: 5
- Winning Hand: K♥ 4♥

Final Table
| Place | Name | Prize |
|---|---|---|
| 1st | Keith Tilston | $660,000 |
| 2nd | Jake Schindler | $429,000 |
| 3rd | Daniel Negreanu | $264,000 |
| 4th | Tom Marchese | $165,000 |
| 5th | Dan Smith | $132,000 |
