= Koray Aldemir =

German poker player (born 1990)

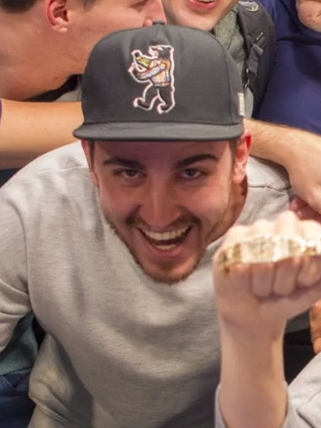
- Aldemir at 2017 WSOPE
- Born: 1990 (age 35–36); Berlin, Germany

World Series of Poker
- Bracelets: 2
- Final tables: 4
- Money finishes: 33
- Highest WSOP Main Event finish: Winner, 2021

European Poker Tour
- Final table: 1
- Money finishes: 4

Koray Aldemir (born 1990) is a German professional poker player of Turkish descent, born in Berlin and now residing in Vienna, Austria. In 2021, he won the World Series of Poker Main Event for $8,000,000.

Aldemir first played poker while at a friend's house on New Year's Eve in 2006. He began by playing freerolls on PokerStars and had his first recorded live cash in January 2012 in a €200 tournament held in Berlin. While playing a tournament in Rozvadov, Czech Republic in 2013, Aldemir allowed another player to use his computer to send money on PokerStars and had his account locked on the site for the next four years. He previously enrolled at Brandenburg University of Technology but did not earn a degree. He moved to Vienna soon after to study psychology in university.

Prior to the Main Event, Aldemir's best career cash was for $2.1 million when he finished in third place in the $111,111 One Drop High Roller at the 2016 World Series of Poker. That same year, he finished runner-up to Adrian Mateos in the Summer Solstice event.

Aldemir won a Triton high roller in the Philippines in 2017 for $1.3 million. In 2018, he finished third in the PokerStars Caribbean Adventure for $481,000. He also won an event at the 2019 U.S. Poker Open.

At the 2021 Main Event, Aldemir began the final table with the chip lead and went heads-up against George Holmes. On the 223rd hand of the final table, Holmes moved all in with K♣ Q♠ on a board of 10♥ 7♠ 2♥ K♠ 9♣ and Aldemir called with 10♦ 7♦ for two pair to win the tournament. The victory moved him past $20 million in career earnings and into fourth place on Germany's all-time money list.

At the 2022 WSOP, Aldemir finished third in the player of the year race, and made another deep run in the Main Event, finishing in 75th place out of 8,663 competitors in defense of his title.

== World Series of Poker bracelets ==
| Year | Tournament | Prize (US$) |
|---|---|---|
| 2021 | $10,000 No Limit Hold'em Main Event | $8,000,000 |
| 2025P | $10,000 8-Game Mix 6-Handed | $287,800 |

"P" indicates a bracelet was won during the World Series of Poker Paradise
