= Brandenburg University of Technology =

Public university in Brandenburg, Germany

Coordinates: 51°46′2″N 14°19′35″E

Brandenburg University of Technology Cottbus–Senftenberg
- Brandenburgische Technische Universität Cottbus–Senftenberg
- Motto: Wir forschen, lehren und lernen aus Leidenschaft. (German)
- Motto in English: We research, teach and study with passion.
- Type: Public
- Established: 1991; 2013 (reestablished)
- Budget: EUR 121.7 million (2018)
- President: Gesine Grande
- Academic staff: 652
- Administrative staff: 680
- Students: 7,000
- Location: Cottbus and Senftenberg, Brandenburg, Germany
- Website: www.b-tu.de

The Brandenburg University of Technology Cottbus–Senftenberg (German: Brandenburgische Technische Universität, BTU) was founded in 1991 and is a technical university in Brandenburg, Germany with campuses in Cottbus and Senftenberg. The university has 185 professors, 640 additional academic staff and more than 7,000 students, of which 2,350 are of foreign origin from more than 100 nations.

== History ==
The university was founded in 1954 as a school for construction engineering in the former GDR. After German reunification, the school became a technical university and was later renamed Brandenburg Technical University in 1994. In the following years, the university underwent major construction efforts and the number of students continued to grow. In February 2013 the Landtag of Brandenburg decided to merge the BTU and the Hochschule Lausitz on 1 July 2013 to create the new university Brandenburgische Technische Universität Cottbus-Senftenberg (abbreviated BTU). Today, the university has 7,280 students, 2,190 of whom come from abroad.

== Structure ==
The university is separated into six faculties (Fakultäten) each of them having a focus on certain study and research areas. Each faculty is further subdivided into institutes (Institute). The following faculties exist:

- Faculty 1: Mathematics, Computer Science, Physics, Electrical Engineering and Information Technology
- Faculty 2: Environment and Natural Sciences
- Faculty 3: Mechanical Engineering, Electrical and Energy Systems
- Faculty 4: Social Work, Health Care and Music
- Faculty 5: Business, Law and Social Sciences
- Faculty 6: Architecture, Civil Engineering and Urban Planning

=== Library ===
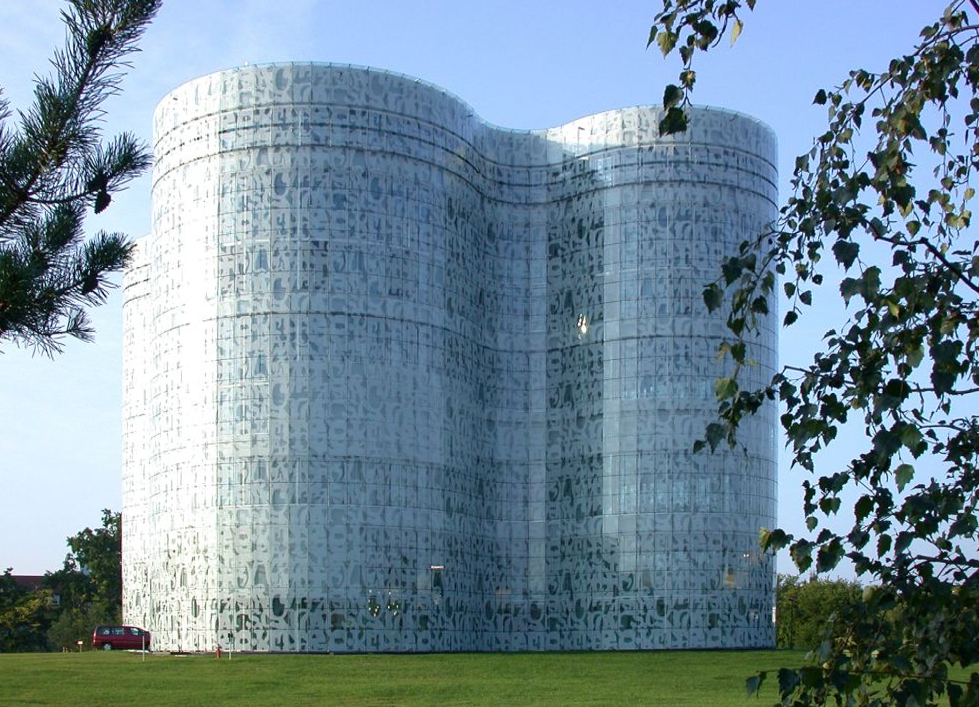
The modern university library

The new library was opened in the year 2004 and is called Informations-, Kommunikations- und Medienzentrum (IKMZ). It was designed by the famous architects Herzog & de Meuron.

== Study ==
=== Academic year ===
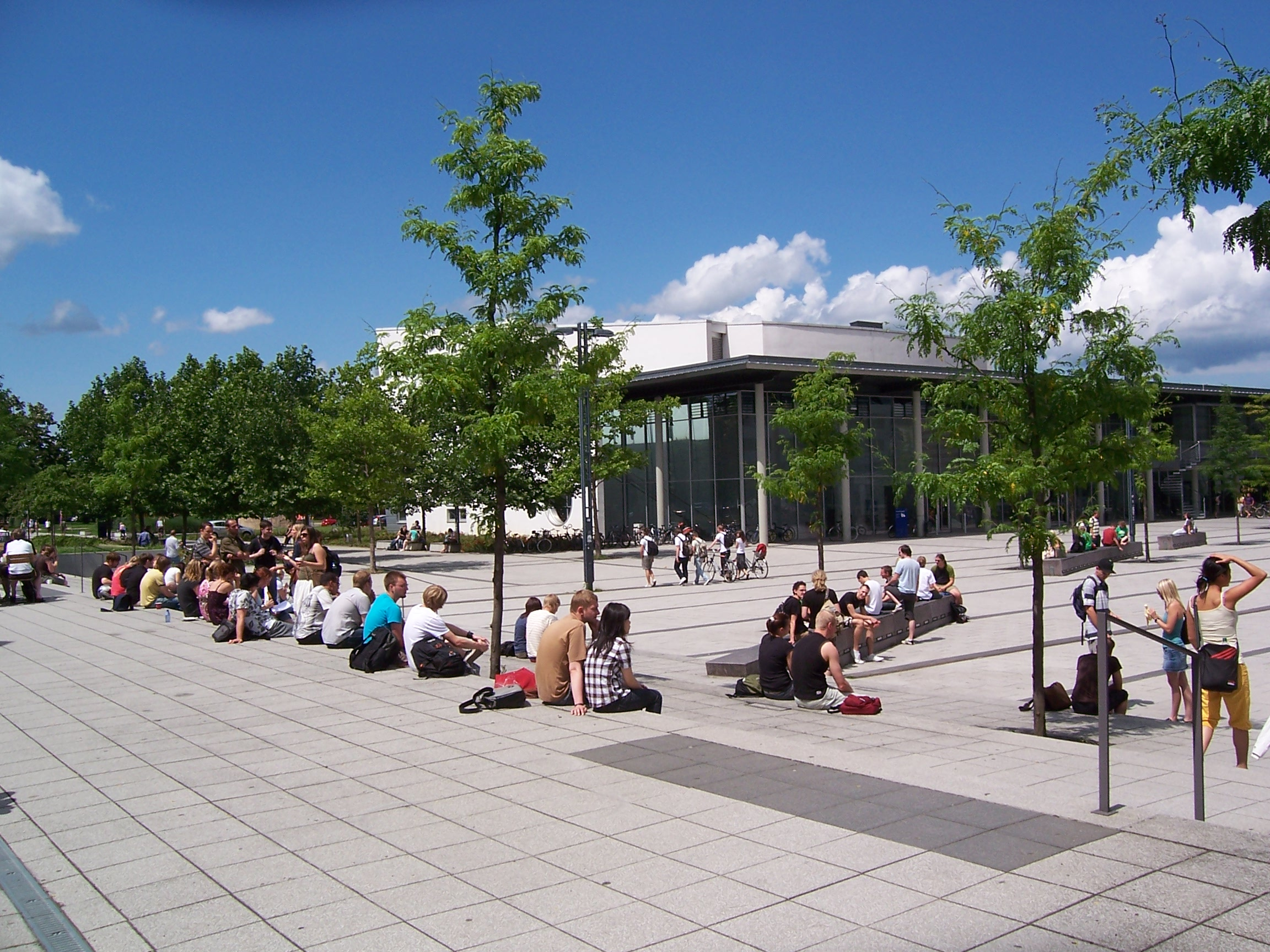
The central forum of BTU

Like for most universities in Germany, the academic year at BTU is divided into two semesters. The winter term (Wintersemester) is the official beginning of the academic year and lasts from 1 October to 31 March. The summer term (Sommersemester) lasts from 1 April to 30 September. The teaching takes place in only 15 weeks per semester and is followed by an examination period (Prüfungszeitraum) where usually no lectures are held.

=== Study programmes ===
In the winter semester for the 2022/23 academic year, around 6,800 students were enrolled at BTU Cottbus-Senftenberg. The proportion of students in STEM subjects is consistently strong at 65%. 40% of the students come from over 120 countries. The proportion of women in the student body is 43%.

With a few exceptions, the degree programmes at BTU Cottbus-Senftenberg are open admission, i.e. without a numerus clausus (NC). Application is possible for all degree programmes in the winter semester, and for some master's and bachelor's programmes in the summer semester.

=== Teaching language ===
German is the teaching language for the majority of the degree programmes. A total of 17 study programmes (one Bachelor, 13 Master, three Ph.D.) are offered in English:

- Artificial Intelligence (Master)
- Biotechnology (Master)
- Control of Renewable Energy Systems (Master)
- Cyber Security (Master)
- Cognitive and Dependable Systems (Ph.D.)
- Environmental and Resource Management (Bachelor / Master / Ph.D.)
- Euro Hydroinformatics and Water Management (Master)
- Heritage Conservation and Site Management (Master)
- Heritage Studies (Ph.D.)
- Hybrid Electric Propulsion Technology (Master)
- Physics (Master)
- Power Engineering (Master)
- Transfers-Fluids-Materials in Aeronautical and Space Applications (Master)
- Urban Design – Revitalization of Historic City Districts (Master)
- World Heritage Studies (Master)

=== Tuition and fees ===
All students, regardless if they are German or non-German, must pay a fee of approximately 165 euros per semester. This fee used to be 321.03 euros and included a student transit pass (Semesterticket) which allowed students to travel on all public transportation services for free in the states of Berlin and Brandenburg. Free use of the regional express train (RE 18) to Dresden-Neustadt was also included. However, with the introduction of the Deutschlandticket (also known as the 49-Euro-Ticket) the Semesterticket is no longer available and students are encouraged to purchase their own Deutschlandticket. Unlike some federal states in Germany, no further fees are collected as the parliament of the federal state of Brandenburg decided not to introduce further study fees (Studiengebühr).

=== Preparation programmes ===
The orientation study College+ is a study preparation programme which supports prospective students in their search for a degree programme that matches their inclinations and abilities. In two semesters, they get to know studying at the university and the variety of degree programmes at BTU Cottbus-Senftenberg.

The BTU Cottbus-Senftenberg offers programmes for prospective students to acquire the university entrance qualification in the state of Brandenburg and language qualification.

- ESiSt – Successful Entry into Higher Education for International Students in Brandenburg
- Bridge to Studies
- Springboard Uni-German with TestDaF

=== International Partnerships ===
The BTU has a worldwide network of partner universities and allows students to take part in European Erasmus Programme or overseas programmes such as STUDEXA or GE4. Students who want to participate in an exchange programme do not need to pay the tuition fee of the hosting university.

=== Double degrees and joint degrees with partner universities ===
BTU Cottbus-Senftenberg offers nine degree programmes with double degrees or joint degrees with universities worldwide.

Study programmes with double degrees:

- Architecture (M.Sc.)
- Environmental and Resource Management (M.Sc.)
- Power Engineering (M.Sc.)
- Social Work (B.A.)
- Urban Design – Revitalisation of Historic City Districts (M.Sc.)
- Lightweight Construction and Materials Technology (M.Sc.)
- World Heritage Studies (M.A.)

Joint degree programmes with one or more partner universities:

- Heritage Conservation and Site Management (M.A.)
- Euro Hydroinformatics and Water Management (ERASMUS Mundus programme) (M.Sc.)
- Transfers-Fluids-Materials in Aeronautical and Space Applications (M.Sc.)

=== Student life ===
The BTU has several facilities for student activities and recreation, including a cafeteria, restaurant, football yard, and career center.

== Research ==
The BTU is a research-oriented university with a focus on both basic and applied research. As a small technical university in Lusatia, the BTU rises up to its responsibility to act as an engine of innovation and internationalisation in the region, and thus to exert a positive influence on the current structural changes in Lusatia. The BTU is also active internationally with its research foci and applies its localised approaches onto an international level. The profile-formed research fields at BTU Cottbus-Senftenberg are:

- Global change and transformation processes
- Energy reform and decarbonization
- Health and life sciences
- Artificial intelligence and sensorics

== Transfer of knowledge and technology ==
The BTU positions itself as a leader with its research portfolio in regional technology and knowledge transfer. The Central Technology Transfer is carried out by the Knowledge and Technology Transfer department, which is led by a university vice-president. This department consists of the pillars of the Technology Transfer Office, Patents/Licences and the Career Centre, and represents the original transfer area. The annual Transfer Day serves to present current results from the BTU. Representatives from various science and industrial sectors meet here to exchange ideas. The largest fair for academic specialists in the state of Brandenburg (campus-x-change) takes place on the central campus of the BTU in Cottbus and aims to provide opportunities for internships, student trainee positions, final theses and graduate positions. A transfer database provides an overview of the BTU subject areas.

The BTU has developed a joint transfer strategy with the Technical University of Wildau. The declared aim of both universities is to actively promote networking with industry in the state of Brandenburg. In particular, the transfer project Innovation Hub 13, which was funded by the BMBF for the years 2018 to 2022 as part of the Innovative University funding initiative, has been a central component of these efforts. The project focuses on new transfer paths, but also on improved knowledge management via the joint platform Innovation Hub 13.

The Joint Lab Reliable Sensor Networks initiative is a collaboration of the Institute of Computer Science, the BTU Cottbus-Senftenberg and the Leibniz Institute for Innovative Microelectronics (IHP), in which researchers, students and doctoral candidates from the various institutions engage in a mutual exchange.

== Notable alumni ==
- Koray Aldemir, professional poker player
- Claudia Bührig, author
- Andrea Rögner, scientist
- Harald Schwefel, physicist
