= Dan Smith (poker player) =

American poker player (born 1989)

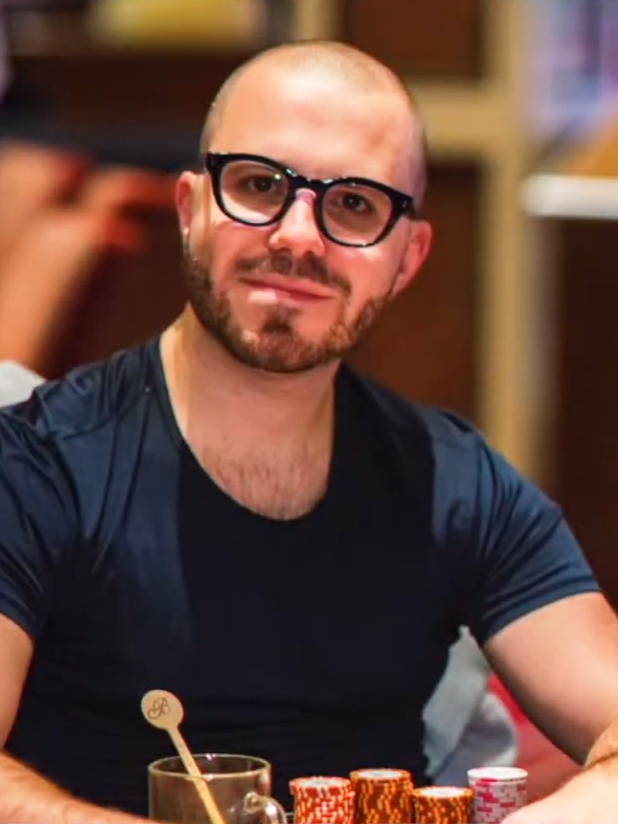
- Smith in 2019
- Nicknames: King Dan, Truck Dan, Cowboy Dan
- Born: February 23, 1989 (age 37)

World Series of Poker
- Bracelet: 1
- Money finishes: 23
- Highest WSOP Main Event finish: 20th, 2014

World Poker Tour
- Title: 1
- Final table: 1
- Money finishes: 3

European Poker Tour
- Titles: 8
- Final tables: 17
- Money finishes: 29

Dan Smith (born February 23, 1989, in Manalapan Township, New Jersey) is an American professional poker player. He now resides in Las Vegas, Nevada. Smith has won many titles during his poker career, including a World Poker Tour title, a World Series of Poker bracelet and a championship event at the Aussie Millions.

== Poker ==
Dan Smith started playing online poker at the age of 16, before actually reaching the legal gambling age in the US. He is a former chess player who got into college on a chess scholarship, but he decided to stop his studies in 2007 (at 18 years old) to pursue a full-time poker career.

Smith's first cash and victory was in 2008, when he won the Heartland Poker Tour Main Event at Turning Stone Resort & Casino in New York for $101,960. In June 2014, he won the Bellagio Super High Roller $100,000 buy-in event with a grand prize of $2,044,766, his biggest cash up to that point. He has over 74 cashes in live poker tournaments and has won over $55,000,000.

The year 2012 was the turning point of Smith's career. He started the year by winning Aussie Millions 100k Challenge event for $1,012,000 AUD. He went on a tear in April at the EPT Monte Carlo Series. In a span of five days, he won three separate €5000 events for a combined €520,980.

In August of that year, Smith captured the €962,925 first-place prize of the Season 9 EPT Barcelona €50,000 Super High Roller.

Smith has had multiple strong showings during the WSOP; in 2015, he finished third in the $10,000 PLO for $369,564 and in 2014, he finished 20th in the $10,000 Main Event for $286,900. In 2012, Smith finished seventh in the Partouche Poker tour for €178,496

All in all, Smith won six tournaments in 2012 and eventually won the 2012 GPI POY and finished runner up in the Card Player POY to Greg Merson as well as runner up in the Bluff Poy to Marvin Rettenmaier

In December 2013, Smith took down the WPT Doyle Brunson Five Diamond World Poker Classic for $1,161,135.

In July 2016, Smith finished second in WSOP $111,111 No Limit Hold'em High Roller for One Drop for $3,078,974.

In September 2014, Smith was ranked first in the world by the Global poker index. In September 2018, he placed third in the WSOP $1 million Big One for One Drop event for $4,000,000. In 2019, Smith finished in third place at the Triton Poker Series Million for Charity poker tournament, which had a buy in of £1,050,000, for over $8.5 Million. In 2023, he finished in third place for the third time at a $1 million buy-in event, at the 2023 WPT million for one drop, earning over $2.8 million.

In June, at the 2022 World Series of Poker, Smith captured his first bracelet. He defeated Christoph Vogelsang in the 25k Heads-UP Championship. Before his win, Smith was regarded as one of the best players without a bracelet.

As of July 2024, Smith's live tournament winnings exceed $55,000,000.

=== World Series of Poker ===
Bracelets
Year	Tournament	Prize
2022	$25,000 Heads Up No-Limit Hold'em Championship	$509,717

=== Triton Poker Series ===
Festival	Tournament	Prize
Monte-Carlo 2023	$200k NLH Invitational	$3,870,000
Jeju 2024	$50k NLH Turbo Bounty	$ 951,000 + $300,000 bounty

=== Poker GO Tour titles ===
Year	Tournament	Prize
2021	ARIA High Roller #1 - $10,000 NLH	$136,000
2022	WSOP #6 - $25,000 Heads-Up Championship	$509,717
2023	U.S. Poker Open #9: $25,000 No-Limit Hold'em	$399,500
2023	ARIA High Roller #16: $10,100 NLH	$119,600
2024	U.S. Poker Open #3 - $10,100 No-Limit Hold'em	$235,200

== Charitable activities ==
Dan Smith started Double Up Drive, which makes donation matching for charities considered highly effective.
