= Shannon Shorr =

American poker player (born 1985)

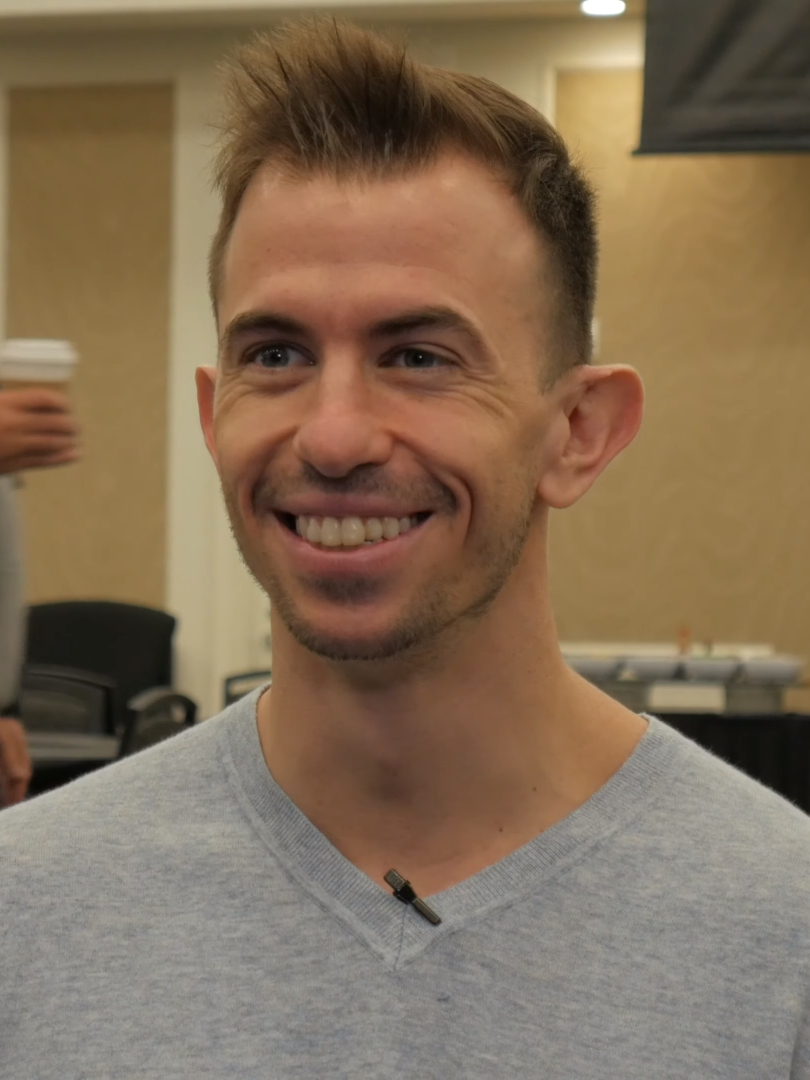
- Shorr in 2019
- Born: June 7, 1985 (age 41); Birmingham, Alabama, U.S.

World Series of Poker
- Bracelet: 2
- Final tables: 15
- Money finishes: 112
- Highest WSOP Main Event finish: 39th, 2018

World Poker Tour
- Title: None
- Final tables: 4
- Money finishes: 19

European Poker Tour
- Title: None
- Final table: None
- Money finishes: 6

Shannon Shorr (born June 7, 1985) is an American professional poker player from Birmingham, Alabama. Shorr was a baseball player at Shades Valley High School.

Shorr is notable for his success in poker tournaments, much of which occurred before his 21st birthday. Because 21 is the minimum legal age for gambling in almost all jurisdictions in the United States, Shorr was forced to go abroad to compete, where he cashed in several tournaments. He scored his first major payday with a fourth-place finish at the 2006 Aussie Millions tournament in Melbourne, Australia, where he won more than $200,000. During much of this time, Shorr was a civil engineering student at the University of Alabama.

== Poker ==
In December 2013, Shorr was honored at #7 on GPI's "Poker Player of the Decade" list.

Shorr has amassed multiple tournament cashes worldwide each year, including 70 World Series of Poker cashes, of which ten were final tables. He has made four World Poker Tour final tables.

Shorr withdrew from The University of Alabama to play poker professionally in 2006 but returned for the fall semester of 2008. He graduated in 2010.

Shorr's live tournament winnings exceed $12,000,000. His 54 cashes at the WSOP account for $1,594,564 of those winnings.

== World Series of Poker Bracelets ==
Year	Tournament	Prize US$
2023 O	$2,000 No-Limit Hold'em 6 Max	$89,126
2023 O	$1,000 No-Limit Hold'em Freezeout	$35,539
2025 O	$500 No-Limit Hold’em Mystery Bounty (Online)	$56,143

"O" indicates a bracelet on during a World Series of Poker Online series
