= Nick Petrangelo =

American poker player (born 1987)

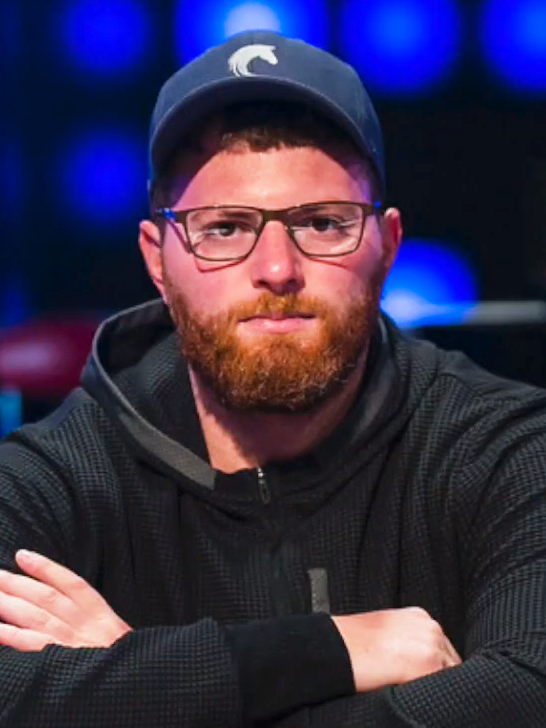
- Nick Petrangelo (2018)
- Nickname: caecilius
- Born: January 2, 1987 (age 39); Feeding Hills, Massachusetts

World Series of Poker
- Bracelets: 2
- Money finishes: 23
- Highest WSOP Main Event finish: 45th, 2021

World Poker Tour
- Title: None
- Money finishes: 2

European Poker Tour
- Money finishes: 5

Nick Petrangelo (born January 2, 1987) is an American professional poker player from Feeding Hills, Massachusetts, who won two World Series of Poker bracelets.

== Poker career ==
Petrangelo plays online under the nickname caecilius. In December 2012, he scooped the most points in the PocketFives ranking, which lists the most successful online tournament players. On PokerStars, Petrangelo won the high-roller event of the World Championship of Online Poker in September 2017 winning $625,000. Since 2009, he participates in live tournaments.

In 2015, Petrangelo won his first WSOP bracelet at the World Series of Poker. In December of that year, Petrangelo finished runner up to Fedor Holz in the $100,000 WPT Alpha8 No Limit Hold'em High Roller event, winning $1,015,335.

Petrangelo won a side event at the WPT Seminole Hard Rock Poker Showdown in 2016, winning $93,208. Petrangelo won the 2017 Aussie Millions ANTON Jewellery AU$100,000 Challenge in January 2017, netting him AU$882,000.

Petrangelo won his second bracelet in the $100,000 No-Limit Hold’em event at the 2018 World Series of Poker, winning $2,910,227 making it his biggest live tournament score.

As of July 2026, his total live tournament winnings exceed $41,900,000.

== World Series of Poker bracelets ==
Year	Tournament	Prize (US$)
2015	$3,000 No Limit Hold'em Shootout	$201,812
2018	$100,000 No Limit Hold'em High Roller	$2,910,227
