= 2020 Poker Masters Online =

Series of poker tournaments

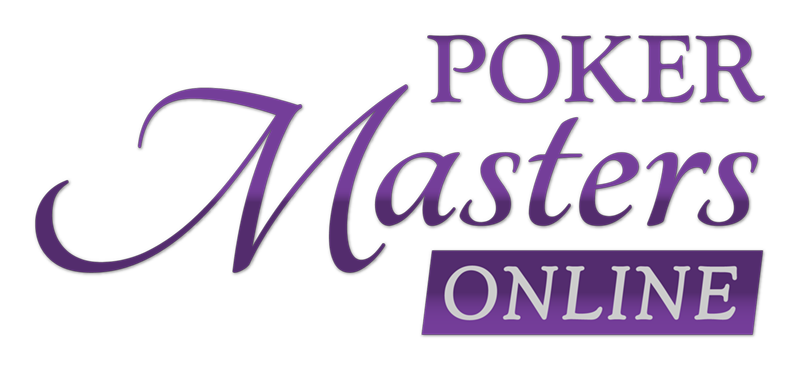
- Location: partypoker (online)
- Dates: April 12-26, 2020

Champion
- (Greece) Alexandros Kolonias (Purple Jacket winner); (Switzerland) Linus Loeliger (Main Event winner)

The 2020 Poker Masters Online was the fourth season of the Poker Masters. Following the COVID-19 pandemic, the Poker Masters moved online to partypoker and took place from April 12-26, 2020. The event was sponsored by Poker Central and partypoker, and some final tables were streamed on PokerGO's Facebook page. There were 30 events on the schedule including 25 No-Limit Hold'em and five Pot-Limit Omaha tournaments. Buy-ins ranged from $10,000 to the $50,000 Main Event.

The Main Event was won by Switzerland's Linus Loeliger, and the Poker Masters Purple Jacket was awarded to Greece's Alexandros Kolonias.

== Schedule ==
The schedule for the 2020 Poker Masters Online included 25 No-Limit Hold'em and five Pot-Limit Omaha tournaments. All tournaments carried a prize pool guarantee of between $250,000 and $1,000,000. The $50,000 buy-in Main Event carried a $2,000,000 prize pool guarantee. Each day of play featured at least two tournaments, and would either be eight-handed or six-handed.

2020 Poker Masters Online
#	Event	Entrants	Prize Pool (US$)	Winner	Prize (US$)	Runner-up	Results
1	$25,000 No-Limit Hold'em	55	$1,372,875	(Finland) Elias Talvitie	$481,250	(Spain) Sergi Reixach	Results
2	$10,000 Pot-Limit Omaha 6-Max	55	$551,999	(Germany) Tobias Ziegler	$192,249	(England) James Akenhead	Results
3	$10,000 No-Limit Hold'em 6-Max	99	$989,999	(United States) Alex Foxen	$309,677	(Russia) Artur Martirosian	Results
4	$10,000 No-Limit Hold'em	102	$1,014,900	(Canada) Mike Watson	$249,900	(Canada) Sam Greenwood	Results
5	$10,000 No-Limit Hold'em 6-Max	83	$830,062	(Hungary) Andras Nemeth	$259,692	(Turkey) Orpen Kisacikoglu	Results
6	$10,000 Pot-Limit Omaha 6-Max	97	$969,999	(Finland) Pauli Ayras	$303,421	(Germany) Jens Lakemeier	Results
7	$10,000 No-Limit Hold'em 6-Max	86	$859,999	(Greece) Alexandros Kolonias	$269,013	(United States) George Wolff	Results
8	$10,000 No-Limit Hold'em	104	$1,040,000	(Finland) Joni Jouhkimainen	$254,800	(Hungary) Andras Nemeth	Results
9	$10,000 No-Limit Hold'em 6-Max	78	$779,998	(Canada) Pascal Lefrancois	$243,988	(United States) Justin Bonomo	Results
10	$10,000 No-Limit Hold'em	119	$1,190,000	(Australia) Kahle Burns	$291,550	(Netherlands) Luuk Gieles	Results
11	$10,000 No-Limit Hold'em 6-Max	94	$939,999	(Australia) Michael Addamo	$294,037	(United States) Chris Hunichen	Results
12	$10,000 Pot-Limit Omaha 6-Max	87	$868,999	(Hungary) Laszlo Bujtas	$272,141	(Canada) Ami Barer	Results
13	$10,000 No-Limit Hold'em 6-Max	68	$679,998	(Netherlands) Luuk Gieles	$235,217	(Canada) Timothy Adams	Results
14	$10,000 No-Limit Hold'em	114	$1,140,000	(Italy) Mustapha Kanit	$279,300	(Greece) Alexandros Kolonias	Results
15	$10,000 Pot-Limit Omaha 6-Max	78	$779,998	(Canada) Timothy Adams	$243,988	(Portugal) Joao Vieira	Results
16	$25,000 No-Limit Hold'em	72	$1,800,000	(United States) Jason Koon	$549,000	(United States) Justin Bonomo	Results
17	$10,000 Pot-Limit Omaha 6-Max	92	$919,999	(Finland) Eelis Pärssinen	$287,781	(Sweden) Bengt Sonnert	Results
18	$10,000 No-Limit Hold'em 6-Max	104	$1,039,997	(Switzerland) Linus Loeliger	$325,318	(Russia) Artur Martirosian	Results
19	$25,000 No-Limit Hold'em	77	$1,924,999	(Finland) Pauli Ayras	$548,625	(Canada) Sam Greenwood	Results
20	$10,000 No-Limit Hold'em 6-Max	86	$859,299	(United States) Steve O'Dwyer	$269,013	(United States) David Peters	Results
21	$25,000 No-Limit Hold'em	77	$1,574,999	(United States) Dan Smith	$511,875	(Russia) Artur Martirosian	Results
22	$10,000 No-Limit Hold'em 6-Max	86	$769,998	(Canada) Sebastian Lewin	$240,860	(United States) Alex Foxen	Results
23	$25,000 Pot-Limit Omaha 6-Max	64	$1,524,999	(Canada) Pascal Lefrancois	$527,509	(Hungary) Andras Nemeth	Results
24	$10,000 No-Limit Hold'em 6-Max	110	$1,099,999	(Bosnia and Herzegovina) Ali Imsirovic	$277,096	(England) Benjamin Jones	Results
25	$25,000 No-Limit Hold'em	64	$1,600,000	(Finland) Samuel Vousden	$520,000	(Poland) Wiktor Malinowski	Results
26	$10,000 No-Limit Hold'em 6-Max	110	$909,999	(Republic of Ireland) Mark Davis	$284,653	(United States) Rob Lipkin	Results
27	$25,000 No-Limit Hold'em	51	$1,275,000	(Bosnia and Herzegovina) Ali Imsirovic	$446,250	(Finland) Elias Talvitie	Results
28	$10,000 No-Limit Hold'em 6-Max	56	$760,000	(Italy) Mustapha Kanit	$237,733	(Austria) Matthias Eibinger	Results
29	$50,000 No-Limit Hold'em Main Event	77	$3,850,000	(Switzerland) Linus Loeliger	$1,097,250	(Venezuela) Giuseppe Iadisernia	Results
30	$10,000 No-Limit Hold'em 6-Max	77	$1,459,996	(Greece) Alexandros Kolonias	$367,782	(England) Jason McConnon	Results

== Purple Jacket standings ==
The 2020 Poker Masters Online awarded the Purple Jacket to the player that accumulated the most points during the series. Greece's Alexandros Kolonias overtook Russia's Artur Martirosian in the final event to win the Purple Jacket. Kolonias won two events and cashed 11 times on his way to accumulating $1,266,296 in winnings. Kolonias accumulated 1,191 points and was awarded the Purple Jacket.

Poker Masters Purple Jacket Standings
Rank	Name	Earnings	Points
1	(Greece) Alexandros Kolonias	$1,266,296	1,191
2	(Russia) Artur Martirosian	$1,278,974	1,048
3	(Switzerland) Linus Loeliger	$1,511,818	1,037
4	(Canada) Timothy Adams	$1,043,882	861
5	(Bosnia and Herzegovina) Ali Imsirovic	$1,035,696	857
6	(Hungary) Andras Nemeth	$974,987	807
7	(Canada) Pascal Lefrancois	$1,049,887	782
8	(Finland) Pauli Ayras	$968,048	748
9	(United States) Alex Foxen	$792,677	736
10	(United States) Steve O'Dwyer	$1,005,654	732

== Results ==
=== Event #1: $25,000 No-Limit Hold'em ===
- 1-Day Event: April 12, 2020
- Number of Entrants: 55
- Total Prize Pool: $1,372,875
- Number of Payouts: 7

Event #1 Results
Place	Name	Prize
1st	(Finland) Elias Talvitie	$481,250
2nd	(Spain) Sergi Reixach	$323,125
3rd	(Germany) Ole Schemion	$206,125
4th	(Canada) Sam Greenwood	$123,750
5th	(Australia) Michael Addamo	$96,250
6th	(United States) Chris Hunichen	$79,063
7th	(Spain) Juan Pardo Dominguez	$63,313

=== Event #2: $10,000 Pot-Limit Omaha 6-Max ===
- 1-Day Event: April 12, 2020
- Number of Entrants: 55
- Total Prize Pool: $551,999
- Number of Payouts: 9

Event #2 Results
Place	Name	Prize
1st	(Germany) Tobias Ziegler	$192,249
2nd	(England) James Akenhead	$123,750
3rd	(Norway) Espen Myrmo	$66,000
4th	(Australia) Matt Kirk	$49,500
5th	(Norway) Ola Amundsgaard	$35,750
6th	(Finland) Kai Lehto	$24,750
7th	Robinson Morales	$20,000
8th	(England) Sam Trickett	$20,000
9th	(Finland) Jukka Paloniemi	$20,000

=== Event #3: $10,000 No-Limit Hold'em 6-Max ===
- 1-Day Event: April 12, 2020
- Number of Entrants: 99
- Total Prize Pool: $989,999
- Number of Payouts: 12

Event #3 Results
Place	Name	Prize
1st	(United States) Alex Foxen	$309,677
2nd	(Russia) Artur Martirosian	$193,050
3rd	(Spain) Adrian Mateos	$118,800
4th	(England) Conor Beresford	$86,625
5th	(Canada) Timothy Adams	$61,875
6th	(Bosnia and Herzegovina) Ali Imsirovic	$42,075
7th	(Poland) Wiktor Malinowski	$32,175
8th	(Spain) Juan Pardo Dominguez	$32,175
9th	(United States) Chris Hunichen	$32,175
10th	(United States) Justin Bonomo	$27,124
11th	(United States) Mohsin Charania	$27,124
12th	(United States) Elio Fox	$27,124

=== Event #4: $10,000 No-Limit Hold'em ===
- 1-Day Event: April 13, 2020
- Number of Entrants: 102
- Total Prize Pool: $1,014,900
- Number of Payouts: 16

Event #4 Results
Place	Name	Prize
1st	(Canada) Mike Watson	$249,900
2nd	(Canada) Sam Greenwood	$178,500
3rd	(Netherlands) Jorryt van Hoof	$127,500
4th	(Turkey) Orpen Kisacikoglu	$89,250
5th	(Poland) Wiktor Malinowski	$66,300
6th	(Lebanon) Karim Khayat	$51,000
7th	(England) Patrick Leonard	$40,800
8th	(Finland) Pauli Ayras	$33,150
9th	(United States) Zachary Clark	$25,500
10th	(India) Darrell Goh	$25,500
11th	(Greece) Alexandros Kolonias	$25,500
12th	(Austria) Matthias Eibinger	$20,400
13th	(Hungary) Andras Nemeth	$20,400
14th	(Spain) Vicent Bosca	$20,400
15th	(Sweden) Simon Mattsson	$20,400
16th	(Denmark) Simon Pedersen	$20,400

=== Event #5: $10,000 No-Limit Hold'em 6-Max ===
- 1-Day Event: April 13, 2020
- Number of Entrants: 83
- Total Prize Pool: $830,062
- Number of Payouts: 12

Event #5 Results
Place	Name	Prize
1st	(Hungary) Andras Nemeth	$259,692
2nd	(Turkey) Orpen Kisacikoglu	$161,850
3rd	(Finland) Eelis Pärssinen	$99,600
4th	(Germany) Fedor Holz	$72,625
5th	(United States) Dan Shak	$51,875
6th	(Finland) Sami Kelopuro	$35,275
7th	(Germany) Christoph Vogelsang	$26,975
8th	Carlos Sanchez	$26,975
9th	(Finland) Joni Jouhkimainen	$26,975
10th	(Spain) Sergi Reixach	$22,740
11th	(Russia) Artur Martirosian	$22,740
12th	Ian Engel	$22,740

=== Event #6: $10,000 Pot-Limit Omaha 6-Max ===
- 1-Day Event: April 14, 2020
- Number of Entrants: 97
- Total Prize Pool: $969,999
- Number of Payouts: 12

Event #6 Results
Place	Name	Prize
1st	(Finland) Pauli Ayras	$303,421
2nd	(Germany) Jens Lakemeier	$189,150
3rd	(Canada) Ami Barer	$116,400
4th	(Netherlands) Jorryt van Hoof	$84,875
5th	(Finland) Samuli Sipilia	$60,625
6th	(Germany) Ole Schemion	$41,225
7th	(Finland) Lauri Varonen	$31,525
8th	(Canada) Pascal Lefrancois	$31,525
9th	(United States) George Wolff	$31,525
10th	(Finland) Jens Kyllönen	$26,576
11th	(Finland) Aku Joentausta	$26,576
12th	Marius Kennelly	$26,576

=== Event #7: $10,000 No-Limit Hold'em 6-Max ===
- 1-Day Event: April 14, 2020
- Number of Entrants: 86
- Total Prize Pool: $859,999
- Number of Payouts: 12

Event #7 Results
Place	Name	Prize
1st	(Greece) Alexandros Kolonias	$269,013
2nd	(United States) George Wolff	$167,700
3rd	(Bosnia and Herzegovina) Ali Imsirovic	$103,200
4th	(Italy) Mustapha Kanit	$75,250
5th	(Australia) Michael Addamo	$53,750
6th	(Finland) Pauli Ayras	$36,550
7th	(Spain) Juan Pardo Dominguez	$27,950
8th	Ian Engel	$27,950
9th	(United States) Nick Petrangelo	$27,950
10th	(United States) Elio Fox	$23,562
11th	(Canada) Timothy Adams	$23,562
12th	(Netherlands) Jorryt van Hoof	$23,562

=== Event #8: $10,000 No-Limit Hold'em ===
- 1-Day Event: April 15, 2020
- Number of Entrants: 104
- Total Prize Pool: $1,040,000
- Number of Payouts: 16

Event #8 Results
Place	Name	Prize
1st	(Finland) Joni Jouhkimainen	$254,800
2nd	(Hungary) Andras Nemeth	$182,000
3rd	(Spain) Sergi Reixach	$130,000
4th	(Finland) Elias Talvitie	$91,000
5th	(Spain) Juan Pardo Dominguez	$67,600
6th	(Canada) Timothy Adams	$52,000
7th	(United States) Alex Foxen	$41,600
8th	(Italy) Dario Sammartino	$33,800
9th	(United States) Chris Hunichen	$26,000
10th	(Portugal) Joao Vieira	$26,000
11th	Carlos Sanchez	$26,000
12th	(Denmark) Simon Pedersen	$26,000
13th	(England) Benjamin Rolle	$20,800
14th	(Finland) Sami Kelopuro	$20,800
15th	(Canada) Mike Watson	$20,800
16th	(Portugal) Rui Ferreira	$20,800

=== Event #9: $10,000 No-Limit Hold'em 6-Max ===
- 1-Day Event: April 15, 2020
- Number of Entrants: 78
- Total Prize Pool: $779,998
- Number of Payouts: 12

Event #9 Results
Place	Name	Prize
1st	(Canada) Pascal Lefrancois	$243,988
2nd	(United States) Justin Bonomo	$152,100
3rd	(Canada) Kristen Bicknell	$93,600
4th	(Germany) Fedor Holz	$68,250
5th	(Hungary) Andras Nemeth	$48,750
6th	(Italy) Dario Sammartino	$33,150
7th	Ioannis Kostas	$25,350
8th	(United States) Jake Schindler	$25,350
9th	(Canada) Timothy Adams	$25,350
10th	(Greece) Alexandros Kolonias	$21,370
11th	Ian Engel	$21,370
12th	(Finland) Pauli Ayras	$21,370

=== Event #10: $10,000 No-Limit Hold'em ===
- 1-Day Event: April 16, 2020
- Number of Entrants: 119
- Total Prize Pool: $1,190,000
- Number of Payouts: 16

Event #10 Results
Place	Name	Prize
1st	(Australia) Kahle Burns	$291,550
2nd	(Netherlands) Luuk Gieles	$208,250
3rd	(Finland) Eelis Pärssinen	$148,750
4th	(Italy) Gianluca Speranza	$104,125
5th	(Portugal) Joao Vieira	$77,350
6th	(Poland) Wiktor Malinowski	$59,500
7th	Edwin Amaya	$47,600
8th	(Spain) Vicent Bosca	$38,675
9th	Ian Engel	$29,750
10th	(Venezuela) Giuseppe Iadisernia	$29,750
11th	(England) Ben Heath	$29,750
12th	(Austria) Thomas Muehloecker	$29,750
13th	(Canada) Timothy Adams	$23,800
14th	(Lebanon) Karim Khayat	$23,800
15th	(Canada) Mike Watson	$23,800
16th	(United States) Chris Hunichen	$23,800

=== Event #11: $10,000 No-Limit Hold'em 6-Max ===
- 1-Day Event: April 16, 2020
- Number of Entrants: 94
- Total Prize Pool: $939,999
- Number of Payouts: 12

Event #11 Results
Place	Name	Prize
1st	(Australia) Michael Addamo	$294,037
2nd	(United States) Chris Hunichen	$183,300
3rd	(Netherlands) Jorryt van Hoof	$112,800
4th	Yahia Fahmy	$82,250
5th	(United States) Justin Bonomo	$58,750
6th	(Belarus) Aliaksandr Hirs	$39,950
7th	(United States) Jake Schindler	$30,550
8th	Lukas Nowakowski	$30,550
9th	(Netherlands) Luuk Gieles	$30,550
10th	(Poland) Wiktor Malinowski	$25,754
11th	(England) Talal Shakerchi	$25,754
12th	(Greece) Alexandros Kolonias	$25,754

=== Event #12: $10,000 Pot-Limit Omaha 6-Max ===
- 1-Day Event: April 17, 2020
- Number of Entrants: 87
- Total Prize Pool: $868,999
- Number of Payouts: 12

Event #12 Results
Place	Name	Prize
1st	(Hungary) Laszlo Bujtas	$272,141
2nd	(Canada) Ami Barer	$169,650
3rd	(Netherlands) Carlo van Ravenswood	$104,400
4th	(Netherlands) Jorryt van Hoof	$75,125
5th	(Sweden) Bengt Sonnert	$54,375
6th	(Norway) Andreas Torbergsen	$36,975
7th	(Bosnia and Herzegovina) Ali Imsirovic	$28,275
8th	(United States) Adam Hendrix	$28,275
9th	(United States) George Wolff	$28,275
10th	Jean Carlos Rincon	$23,836
11th	(Hungary) Andras Nemeth	$23,836
12th	Christopher Frank	$23,836

=== Event #13: $10,000 No-Limit Hold'em 6-Max ===
- 1-Day Event: April 17, 2020
- Number of Entrants: 68
- Total Prize Pool: $679,998
- Number of Payouts: 9

Event #13 Results
Place	Name	Prize
1st	(Netherlands) Luuk Gieles	$235,217
2nd	(Canada) Timothy Adams	$153,000
3rd	(Scotland) Ludovic Geilich	$81,600
4th	(Australia) Kahle Burns	$61,200
5th	(United States) Alex Foxen	$44,200
6th	(Canada) Mike Watson	$30,600
7th	Lukas Nowakowski	$24,727
8th	(Greece) Alexandros Kolonias	$24,727
9th	(United States) Steve O'Dwyer	$24,727

=== Event #14: $10,000 No-Limit Hold'em ===
- 1-Day Event: April 18, 2020
- Number of Entrants: 114
- Total Prize Pool: $1,140,000
- Number of Payouts: 16

Event #14 Results
Place	Name	Prize
1st	(Italy) Mustapha Kanit	$279,300
2nd	(Greece) Alexandros Kolonias	$199,500
3rd	(Russia) Artur Martirosian	$142,500
4th	(Brazil) Brunno Botteon	$99,750
5th	(Germany) Christoph Vogelsang	$74,100
6th	Edwin Amaya	$57,000
7th	(Denmark) Simon Pedersen	$45,600
8th	(United States) Alex Foxen	$37,050
9th	(England) Simon Higgins	$28,500
10th	(England) Lucas Reeves	$28,500
11th	(United States) Jake Schindler	$28,500
12th	(England) Chris Fraser	$28,500
13th	(Canada) Mike Watson	$22,800
14th	(United States) Nick Petrangelo	$22,800
15th	(Sweden) Niklas Astedt	$22,800
16th	(Australia) Kahle Burns	$22,800

=== Event #15: $10,000 Pot-Limit Omaha 6-Max ===
- 1-Day Event: April 18, 2020
- Number of Entrants: 78
- Total Prize Pool: $779,998
- Number of Payouts: 12

Event #15 Results
Place	Name	Prize
1st	(Canada) Timothy Adams	$243,988
2nd	(Portugal) Joao Vieira	$152,100
3rd	(Italy) Dario Sammartino	$93,600
4th	(United States) Alex Foxen	$68,250
5th	(England) Ben Heath	$48,750
6th	(Bosnia and Herzegovina) Ali Imsirovic	$33,150
7th	(Greece) Alexandros Kolonias	$25,350
8th	Yahia Fahmy	$25,350
9th	(Netherlands) Jorryt van Hoof	$25,350
10th	(Finland) Sami Kelopuro	$21,370
11th	(Finland) Elias Talvitie	$21,370
12th	(Spain) Juan Pardo Dominguez	$21,370

=== Event #16: $25,000 No-Limit Hold'em ===
- 1-Day Event: April 19, 2020
- Number of Entrants: 72
- Total Prize Pool: $1,800,000
- Number of Payouts: 9

Event #16 Results
Place	Name	Prize
1st	(United States) Jason Koon	$549,000
2nd	(United States) Justin Bonomo	$369,000
3rd	(United States) Steve O'Dwyer	$252,000
4th	(England) Conor Beresford	$162,000
5th	(Spain) Juan Pardo Dominguez	$126,000
6th	(Italy) Dario Sammartino	$99,000
7th	(Finland) Joni Jouhkimainen	$85,500
8th	(United States) Dan Smith	$81,000
9th	(Germany) Ole Schemion	$76,500

=== Event #17: $10,000 Pot-Limit Omaha 6-Max ===
- 1-Day Event: April 19, 2020
- Number of Entrants: 92
- Total Prize Pool: $919,999
- Number of Payouts: 12

Event #17 Results
Place	Name	Prize
1st	(Finland) Eelis Pärssinen	$287,781
2nd	(Sweden) Bengt Sonnert	$179,400
3rd	(Finland) Aku Joentausta	$110,400
4th	(Netherlands) Jorryt van Hoof	$80,500
5th	(Norway) Andreas Torbergsen	$57,500
6th	(Germany) Tobias Ziegler	$39,100
7th	(England) Andrew Moseley	$29,900
8th	(Portugal) Pedro Zagalo	$29,900
9th	(Hungary) Ferenc Deak	$29,900
10th	(Netherlands) Carlo van Ravenswoud	$25,206
11th	(Finland) Niko Soininen	$25,206
12th	(Portugal) Joao Vieira	$25,206

=== Event #18: $10,000 No-Limit Hold'em 6-Max ===
- 1-Day Event: April 19, 2020
- Number of Entrants: 104
- Total Prize Pool: $1,039,997
- Number of Payouts: 12

Event #18 Results
Place	Name	Prize
1st	(Switzerland) Linus Loeliger	$325,318
2nd	(Russia) Artur Martirosian	$202,800
3rd	(India) Darrell Goh	$124,800
4th	(Sweden) Niklas Astedt	$91,000
5th	(Germany) Ole Schemion	$65,000
6th	Edwin Amaya	$44,200
7th	(Spain) Adrian Mateos	$33,800
8th	(United States) Chris Hunichen	$33,800
9th	(Spain) Sergi Reixach	$33,800
10th	(Belarus) Aliaksandr Hirs	$28,493
11th	(Canada) Luc Greenwood	$28,493
12th	(United States) Nick Petrangelo	$28,493

=== Event #19: $25,000 No-Limit Hold'em ===
- 1-Day Event: April 21, 2020
- Number of Entrants: 77
- Total Prize Pool: $1,924,999
- Number of Payouts: 10

Event #19 Results
Place	Name	Prize
1st	(Finland) Pauli Ayras	$548,625
2nd	(Canada) Sam Greenwood	$375,375
3rd	(United States) David Peters	$259,875
4th	(Netherlands) Luuk Gieles	$173,250
5th	(United States) Matthew Wantman	$134,750
6th	(United States) George Wolff	$105,875
7th	(Canada) Guillaume Nolet	$91,437
8th	(Poland) Bartlomiej Machon	$81,812
9th	(United States) Justin Bonomo	$77,000
10th	(Hungary) Andras Nemeth	$77,000

=== Event #20: $10,000 No-Limit Hold'em 6-Max ===
- 1-Day Event: April 21, 2020
- Number of Entrants: 86
- Total Prize Pool: $859,299
- Number of Payouts: 12

Event #20 Results
Place	Name	Prize
1st	(United States) Steve O'Dwyer	$269,013
2nd	(United States) David Peters	$167,000
3rd	(United States) Jake Schindler	$103,200
4th	(Venezuela) Giuseppe Iadisernia	$75,250
5th	(Netherlands) Jorryt van Hoof	$53,750
6th	(Italy) Dario Sammartino	$36,550
7th	(Russia) Artur Martirosian	$27,950
8th	(Bosnia and Herzegovina) Ali Imsirovic	$27,950
9th	(Finland) Eelis Pärssinen	$27,950
10th	(Spain) Adrian Mateos	$23,562
11th	(Finland) Joni Jouhkimainen	$23,562
12th	(Australia) Michael Addamo	$23,562

=== Event #21: $25,000 No-Limit Hold'em ===
- 1-Day Event: April 22, 2020
- Number of Entrants: 77
- Total Prize Pool: $1,574,999
- Number of Payouts: 8

Event #21 Results
Place	Name	Prize
1st	(United States) Dan Smith	$511,875
2nd	(Russia) Artur Martirosian	$346,500
3rd	(Canada) Timothy Adams	$228,375
4th	(United States) Alex Foxen	$141,750
5th	(Austria) Matthias Eibinger	$110,250
6th	(United States) Steve O'Dwyer	$86,625
7th	(Finland) Eelis Pärssinen	$74,812
8th	(Germany) Koray Aldemir	$74,812

=== Event #22: $10,000 No-Limit Hold'em 6-Max ===
- 1-Day Event: April 22, 2020
- Number of Entrants: 86
- Total Prize Pool: $769,998
- Number of Payouts: 12

Event #22 Results
Place	Name	Prize
1st	(Canada) Sebastian Lewin	$240,860
2nd	(United States) Alex Foxen	$150,150
3rd	(Greece) Alexandros Kolonias	$92,400
4th	(United States) David Peters	$67,375
5th	(Bosnia and Herzegovina) Ali Imsirovic	$48,125
6th	(Finland) Joni Jouhkimainen	$32,725
7th	(Italy) Dario Sammartino	$25,025
8th	(Greece) Georgios Zisimopoulos	$25,025
9th	(England) Patrick Leonard	$25,025
10th	(Canada) Mark Radoja	$21,096
11th	(Netherlands) Jorryt van Hoof	$21,096
12th	(Canada) Kristen Bicknell	$21,096

=== Event #23: $25,000 Pot-Limit Omaha 6-Max ===
- 1-Day Event: April 23, 2020
- Number of Entrants: 64
- Total Prize Pool: $1,524,999
- Number of Payouts: 9

Event #23 Results
Place	Name	Prize
1st	(Canada) Pascal Lefrancois	$527,509
2nd	(Hungary) Andras Nemeth	$343,125
3rd	(Norway) Andreas Torbergsen	$183,000
4th	(Portugal) Pedro Zagalo	$137,250
5th	(Greece) Ioannis Kontonatsios	$99,125
6th	(Finland) Aku Joentausta	$68,625
7th	(United States) Evan Mathis	$55,455
8th	Christopher Frank	$55,455
9th	(United States) George Wolff	$55,455

=== Event #24: $10,000 No-Limit Hold'em 6-Max ===
- 1-Day Event: April 23, 2020
- Number of Entrants: 110
- Total Prize Pool: $1,099,999
- Number of Payouts: 18

Event #24 Results
Place	Name	Prize
1st	(Bosnia and Herzegovina) Ali Imsirovic	$277,096
2nd	(England) Benjamin Jones	$187,000
3rd	(Italy) Dario Sammartino	$132,000
4th	(Canada) Sam Greenwood	$93,500
5th	(Spain) Vicent Bosca	$68,750
6th	(Finland) Joni Jouhkimainen	$45,650
7th	(Hungary) Laszlo Bujtas	$34,650
8th	(Netherlands) Luuk Gieles	$34,650
9th	(Finland) Sami Kelopuro	$34,650
10th	(Portugal) Joao Vieira	$23,650
11th	(Greece) Alexandros Kolonias	$23,650
12th	(England) Patrick Leonard	$23,650
13th	(Hungary) Andras Nemeth	$20,184
14th	(Germany) Ole Schemion	$20,184
15th	(India) Darrell Goh	$20,184
16th	(Russia) Artur Martirosian	$20,184
17th	(Colombia) Farid Jattin	$20,184
18th	(United States) George Wolff	$20,184

=== Event #25: $25,000 No-Limit Hold'em ===
- 1-Day Event: April 24, 2020
- Number of Entrants: 64
- Total Prize Pool: $1,600,000
- Number of Payouts: 8

Event #25 Results
Place	Name	Prize
1st	(Finland) Samuel Vousden	$520,000
2nd	(Poland) Wiktor Malinowski	$352,000
3rd	(Russia) Artur Martirosian	$232,000
4th	(Canada) Pascal Lefrancois	$144,000
5th	(Canada) Timothy Adams	$112,000
6th	(Finland) Joni Jouhkimainen	$88,000
7th	(Canada) Guillaume Nolet	$76,000
8th	(United States) Elio Fox	$76,000

=== Event #26: $10,000 No-Limit Hold'em 6-Max ===
- 1-Day Event: April 24, 2020
- Number of Entrants: 110
- Total Prize Pool: $909,999
- Number of Payouts: 12

Event #26 Results
Place	Name	Prize
1st	(Republic of Ireland) Mark Davis	$284,653
2nd	(United States) Rob Lipkin	$177,450
3rd	(Poland) Wiktor Malinowski	$109,200
4th	(Moldova) Pavel Plesuv	$79,625
5th	(Canada) Pascal Lefrancois	$56,875
6th	(Austria) Thomas Muehloecker	$38,675
7th	(Netherlands) Luuk Gieles	$29,575
8th	Lukas Nowakowski	$29,575
9th	(Bosnia and Herzegovina) Ali Imsirovic	$29,575
10th	(United States) Nick Petrangelo	$24,932
11th	(Canada) Timothy Adams	$24,932
12th	(Finland) Pauli Ayras	$24,932

=== Event #27: $25,000 No-Limit Hold'em ===
- 1-Day Event: April 25, 2020
- Number of Entrants: 51
- Total Prize Pool: $1,372,875
- Number of Payouts: 7

Event #27 Results
Place	Name	Prize
1st	(Bosnia and Herzegovina) Ali Imsirovic	$446,250
2nd	(Finland) Elias Talvitie	$299,625
3rd	(Greece) Alexandros Kolonias	$191,250
4th	(Netherlands) Jorryt van Hoof	$114,750
5th	(Switzerland) Linus Loeliger	$89,250
6th	(United States) David Peters	$73,313
7th	(England) Ben Heath	$60,563

=== Event #28: $10,000 No-Limit Hold'em 6-Max ===
- 1-Day Event: April 25, 2020
- Number of Entrants: 56
- Total Prize Pool: $760,000
- Number of Payouts: 12

Event #28 Results
Place	Name	Prize
1st	(Italy) Mustapha Kanit	$237,733
2nd	(Austria) Matthias Eibinger	$148,200
3rd	(Spain) Sergi Reixach	$91,200
4th	(Germany) Koray Aldemir	$66,500
5th	(Canada) Timothy Adams	$47,500
6th	(Germany) Pascal Hartmann	$32,300
7th	(Spain) Juan Pardo Dominguez	$24,700
8th	(United States) David Peters	$24,700
9th	(Greece) Michail Manolakis	$24,700
10th	(United States) Dan Smith	$20,822
11th	(Germany) Ole Schemion	$20,822
12th	(United States) Jon Van Fleet	$20,822

=== Event #29: $50,000 No-Limit Hold'em Main Event ===
- 1-Day Event: April 25, 2020
- Number of Entrants: 77
- Total Prize Pool: $3,850,000
- Number of Payouts: 10

Event #29 Results
Place	Name	Prize
1st	(Switzerland) Linus Loeliger	$1,097,250
2nd	(Venezuela) Giuseppe Iadisernia	$750,750
3rd	(Canada) Chris Kruk	$519,750
4th	(United States) Steve O'Dwyer	$346,500
5th	(Germany) Ole Schemion	$269,500
6th	(Finland) Elias Talvitie	$211,750
7th	(United States) David Peters	$182,875
8th	(Australia) Kahle Burns	$163,625
9th	(England) Conor Beresford	$154,000
10th	(Spain) Vicent Bosca	$154,000

=== Event #30: $10,000 No-Limit Hold'em 6-Max ===
- 1-Day Event: April 25, 2020
- Number of Entrants: 77
- Total Prize Pool: $1,459,996
- Number of Payouts: 18

Event #30 Results
Place	Name	Prize
1st	(Greece) Alexandros Kolonias	$367,782
2nd	(England) Jason McConnon	$248,200
3rd	(Lebanon) Mark Demirjian	$175,200
4th	(Italy) Mustapha Kanit	$124,100
5th	(Russia) Artur Martirosian	$91,250
6th	(Canada) Chris Kruk	$60,590
7th	(Canada) Pascal Lefrancois	$45,990
8th	(Finland) Samuel Vousden	$45,990
9th	(Canada) Mark Radoja	$45,990
10th	(Germany) Hossein Ensan	$31,390
11th	(Republic of Ireland) Mark Davis	$31,390
12th	(United States) Dan Shak	$31,390
13th	(Sweden) Alexander Ivarsson	$26,789
14th	(England) Ben Heath	$26,789
15th	(United States) Chris Hunichen	$26,789
16th	(United States) Connor Drinan	$26,789
17th	(United States) Steve O'Dwyer	$26,789
18th	(Turkey) Orpen Kisacikoglu	$26,789
