= Super High Roller Bowl =

Regional poker tournament series

- Sport: No-Limit Hold'em, Pot-Limit Omaha, Mixed Games
- Founded: July 2015
- Most recent champions: (United States) Brandon Wilson (Super High Roller Bowl XI)
- Most titles: (United States) Justin Bonomo (3)
- Broadcaster: PokerGO
- Sponsor: PokerGO
- Website: www.superhighroller.com

The Super High Roller Bowl is a recurring high stakes No-Limit Hold'em, Pot-Limit Omaha and also Mixed Games poker tournament that takes place at venues across the world.

The first edition of the event was held in July 2015 and featured a US$500,000 buy-in, drawing a field of 43 players. Brian Rast won the inaugural tournament, earning $7,525,000. For its second year, the tournament was moved to May and the buy-in was lowered to $300,000. Entries increased to 49 and Rainer Kempe captured the first prize of $5,000,000. The third year would attract 56 entrants as Christoph Vogelsang defeated Jake Schindler to win the $6,000,000 first-place prize, and ensure back-to-back titles for Germany.

There would be three Super High Roller Bowls held during 2018, and in March, the first international stop of the series would take place at the Babylon Casino in Macau, China. Justin Bonomo defeated Patrik Antonius and the 75-entrant field to win the HK$37,830,000 (~$4,823,000) first-place prize. In May, 48-entrants would play Super High Roller Bowl 2018, and Bonomo would become the first back-to-back champion when he defeated Daniel Negreanu heads-up to win the $5 million first-place prize. The fifth installment of the Super High Roller Bowl would take place in December as Isaac Haxton topped the 36-entrant field, and Alex Foxen heads-up, to win the $3,672,000 first-place prize.

The Super High Roller Bowl expanded to four new countries beginning in 2019 with the Aspers Casino in Stratford, England hosting Super High Roller Bowl London. Cary Katz topped the 12-entrant field to win the £2,100,000 (~$2,610,000) first-place prize. In November, Baha Mar Casino in The Bahamas hosted Super High Roller Bowl Bahamas, and attracted 51 entrants. Daniel Dvoress defeated Wai Leong Chan to win the $4,080,000 first-place prize. In February 2020, The Star Gold Coast hosted 16 entrants for Super High Roller Bowl Australia as Timothy Adams captured the AU$2,150,000 (~$1,446,000) first-place prize. Adams would become the second player to win back-to-back Super High Roller Bowl titles when in March 2020 he won Super High Roller Bowl Russia for $3,600,000 after defeating Vogelsang heads-up to top the 40-entrant field.

In June 2020, the first online Super High Roller Bowl would be held on partypoker and be a $102,000 buy-in. Justin Bonomo won his third Super High Roller Bowl title after he defeated Michael Addamo heads-up, and topped the 50-entrant field to win the $1,775,000 first-place prize.

The Super High Roller Bowl made its debut at the Merit Royal Hotel Casino & Spa in North Cyprus in August 2021. The buy-in was $250,000 and it attracted 41 entrants as Wiktor Malinowski defeated Ivan Leow heads-up to win the $3,690,000 first-place prize. In September, Super High Roller Bowl VI was held inside the PokerGO Studio and attracted 21 players as Michael Addamo denied Justin Bonomo his fourth Super High Roller Bowl title to collect the $3,402,000 first-place prize.

The Super High Roller Bowl returned to the Merit Royal Hotel Casino & Spa in North Cyprus in April 2022 with a 32-entrant field creating a prize pool of $8,000,000. Jake Schindler defeated Paul Phua heads-up to win the $3,200,000 first-place prize.

Super High Roller Bowl VII was held from inside the PokerGO Studio from October 5-7, 2022, with the 24 player field creating a prize pool of $7,200,000. Daniel Negreanu defeated Nick Petrangelo heads-up to win the $3,312,000 first-place prize; the largest win of his career and second biggest lifetime tournament score.

Super High Roller Bowl VIII was held from inside the PokerGO Studio from September 28-30, 2023. The 20-player field created a prize pool of $6,000,000, and Isaac Haxton defeated Andrew Lichtenberger to win the $2,760,000 first-place prize. This was Haxton's second Super High Roller Bowl win, and the second-largest score of his poker career.

For the first time in Super High Roller Bowl history, a Pot-Limit Omaha event was announced to take place from October 16-18, 2023. The buy-in of $100,000 was the biggest Pot-Limit Omaha tournament buy-in in the world at the time, and it attracted a 38-entrant field and created a prize pool of $3,800,000 that paid the final seven players. Jared Bleznick defeated Isaac Haxton heads-up to win the $1,292,000 first-place prize.

Super High Roller Bowl IX was held at Merit Royal Diamond Hotel & Spa in North Cyprus from August 23-25, 2024. The 24 player field created a prize pool of $7,056,000, and Seth Davies defeated Juan Pardo heads-up to win the $3,206,000 first-place prize; the largest career score of his career.

Super High Roller Bowl: $100k Pot-Limit Omaha was held from inside the PokerGO Studio from October 24-26, 2024. The 42-entrant field created a prize pool of $4,200,000, and the final table of seven was paid. Seth Davies defeated Artem Maksimov heads-up to win the $1,500,000 first-place prize, and his second Super High Roller Bowl title.

For the first time in Super High Roller Bowl history, a Mixed Games event was announced to take place from March 6-8, 2025. The mix of games would follow a 10-Game format, and the buy-in of $100,000 was the biggest Mixed Game tournament buy-in in the world at the time. The inaugural event attracted 29 entrants and created a $2,900,000 prize pool. Chad Eveslage defeated Michael Moncek heads-up to win the $1,200,000 first-place prize.

Super High Roller Bowl: $100k Pot-Limit Omaha returned to the PokerGO Studio from October 27-29, 2025. The 37-entrant field was topped by John Riordan, who defeated Sam Soverel heads-up to win the $1,250,000 first-place prize.

Super High Roller Bowl X was held inside the PokerGO Studio from December 20-22, 2025. The buy-in was reduced to $100,000 after being $300,000 since the second installment in 2016. Joao Simao topped the 23-entrant field and defeated Jason Koon heads-up to win the $1,100,000 first-place prize.

The second-ever Super High Roller Bowl: $100k Mixed Games returned to the PokerGO Studio from February 12-14, 2026. The 38-entrant field was topped by Yuri Dzivielevski, who defeated defending champion Chad Eveslage heads-up to win the $1,300,000 first-place prize.

Super High Roller Bowl: $100k Pot-Limit Omaha returned to the PokerGO Studio from October 5-7, 2026. The 32-entrant field was topped by Sean Rafael, who defeated Joao Simao heads-up to win the $1,150,000 first-place prize.

Super High Roller Bowl XI was held inside the PokerGO Studio from October 8-10, 2026. The 28-entrant field was topped by Brandon Wilson, who defeated Nick Petrangelo heads-up to win the $1,125,000 first-place prize.

Footage from the tournaments including live streams and episodes can be found on PokerGO.

== Tournaments ==
| Year | Event | Location | Entrants | Winner | Prize | Winning hand | Runner-up | Losing hand | Results |
|---|---|---|---|---|---|---|---|---|---|
| July 2015 | Super High Roller Bowl I | Aria Resort and Casino | 43 | Brian Rast | $7,525,000 | A♠ 9♠ | Scott Seiver | 5♠ 5♦ | Results |
| May 2016 | Super High Roller Bowl II | Aria Resort and Casino | 49 | Rainer Kempe | $5,000,000 | 8♦ 8♠ | Fedor Holz | 2♥ 2♦ | Results |
| May 2017 | Super High Roller Bowl III | Aria Resort and Casino | 56 | Christoph Vogelsang | $6,000,000 | 10♠ 7♣ | Jake Schindler | J♥ 8♥ | Results |
| March 2018 | Super High Roller Bowl China | Babylon Casino, Macau | 75 | Justin Bonomo | $4,823,077 | 7♦ 5♦ | Patrik Antonius | K♥ 10♥ | Results |
| May 2018 | Super High Roller Bowl IV | Aria Resort and Casino | 48 | Justin Bonomo | $5,000,000 | 9♠ 9♦ | Daniel Negreanu | 8♣ 7♦ | Results |
| December 2018 | Super High Roller Bowl V | Aria Resort and Casino | 36 | Isaac Haxton | $3,672,000 | K♠ J♥ | Alex Foxen | A♦ 8♦ | Results |
| September 2019 | Super High Roller Bowl London | Aspers Casino, Westfield Stratford City | 12 | Cary Katz | $2,610,317 | Q♠ 3♠ | Ali Imsirovic | 10♥ 10♠ | Results |
| November 2019 | Super High Roller Bowl Bahamas | Baha Mar Casino | 51 | Daniel Dvoress | $4,080,000 | A♦ 9♦ | Wai Leong Chan | J♦ 7♥ | Results |
| February 2020 | Super High Roller Bowl Australia | The Star Gold Coast | 16 | Timothy Adams | $1,446,112 | A♥ 9♥ | Kahle Burns | Q♥ J♥ | Results |
| March 2020 | Super High Roller Bowl Russia | Casino Sochi, Sochi | 40 | Timothy Adams | $3,600,000 | A♥ 9♠ | Christoph Vogelsang | A♣ 6♦ | Results |
| June 2020 | Super High Roller Bowl Online | partypoker | 50 | Justin Bonomo | $1,775,000 | K♥ 5♦ | Michael Addamo | Q♠ Q♣ | Results |
| August 2021 | Super High Roller Bowl Europe | Merit Royal Hotel Casino & Spa | 41 | Wiktor Malinowski | $3,690,000 | 9♠ 8♦ | Ivan Leow | J♣ 4♣ | Results |
| September 2021 | Super High Roller Bowl VI | Aria Resort and Casino | 21 | Michael Addamo | $3,402,000 | 7♦ 2♦ | Justin Bonomo | Q♠ 10♠ | Results |
| April 2022 | Super High Roller Bowl Europe | Merit Royal Hotel Casino & Spa | 32 | Jake Schindler | $3,200,000 | Q♣ J♥ | Paul Phua | Q♦ 4♣ | Results |
| October 2022 | Super High Roller Bowl VII | Aria Resort and Casino | 24 | Daniel Negreanu | $3,312,000 | Q♣ 7♣ | Nick Petrangelo | K♠ 5♥ | Results |
| September 2023 | Super High Roller Bowl VIII | Aria Resort and Casino | 20 | Isaac Haxton | $2,760,000 | 10♦ 7♣ | Andrew Lichtenberger | 9♦ 3♥ | Results |
| October 2023 | SHRB: Pot-Limit Omaha | Aria Resort and Casino | 38 | Jared Bleznick | $1,292,000 | 9♥ 5♠ 3♥ 2♠ | Isaac Haxton | Q♠ Q♣ 10♥ 6♥ | Results |
| August 2024 | Super High Roller Bowl IX | Merit Royal Hotel Casino & Spa | 24 | Seth Davies | $3,206,000 | 8♦ 7♣ | Juan Pardo | | Results |
| October 2024 | SHRB: Pot-Limit Omaha | Aria Resort and Casino | 42 | Seth Davies | $1,500,000 | A♥ J♠ 6♠ 4♣ | Artem Maksimov | A♠ K♣ 8♣ 7♠ | Results |
| March 2025 | Super High Roller Bowl: Mixed Games | Aria Resort and Casino | 29 | Chad Eveslage | $1,200,000 | K♣ J♦ | Michael Moncek | J♠ 8♣ | Results |
| October 2025 | SHRB: Pot-Limit Omaha | Aria Resort and Casino | 37 | John Riordan | $1,250,000 | A♣ K♣ 10♠ 5♥ | Sam Soverel | 10♦ 9♠ 6♠ 7♠ | Results |
| December 2025 | Super High Roller Bowl X | Aria Resort and Casino | 23 | Joao Simao | $1,100,000 | 8♦ 8♣ | Jason Koon | 5♠ 5♣ | Results |
| February 2026 | Super High Roller Bowl: Mixed Games | Aria Resort and Casino | 38 | Yuri Dzivielevski | $1,300,000 | A♠ 2♣ 5♦ 6♥ | Chad Eveslage | | Results |
| October 2026 | SHRB: Pot-Limit Omaha | Aria Resort and Casino | 32 | Sean Rafael | $1,150,000 | A♣ 7♣ 7♠ 6♦ | Joao Simao | A♦ K♥ 5♥ 4♥ | Results |
| October 2026 | Super High Roller Bowl XI | Aria Resort and Casino | 28 | Brandon Wilson | $1,125,000 | Q♠ 10♠ | Nick Petrangelo | 7♥ 7♦ | Results |

== Results ==
=== Super High Roller Bowl I (2015) ===
- 3-Day Event: July 2–4
- Buy-in: $500,000
- Number of Entries: 43
- Total Prize Pool: $21,500,000
- Number of Payouts: 7
- Winning Hand: A♠ 9♠

Final Table
| Place | Name | Prize |
|---|---|---|
| 1st | (United States) Brian Rast | $7,525,000 |
| 2nd | (United States) Scott Seiver | $5,160,000 |
| 3rd | (United States) Connor Drinan | $3,225,000 |
| 4th | (Russia) Timofey Kuznetsov | $2,150,000 |
| 5th | (United States) David Peters | $1,505,000 |
| 6th | (United States) Tom Marchese | $1,075,000 |
| 7th | (United States) Erik Seidel | $860,000 |

=== Super High Roller Bowl II (2016) ===
- 4-Day Event: May 29-June 1
- Buy-in: $300,000
- Number of Entries: 49
- Total Prize Pool: $15,000,000
- Number of Payouts: 7
- Winning Hand: 8♦ 8♠

Final Table
| Place | Name | Prize |
|---|---|---|
| 1st | (Germany) Rainer Kempe | $5,000,000 |
| 2nd | (Germany) Fedor Holz | $3,500,000 |
| 3rd | (United States) Erik Seidel | $2,400,000 |
| 4th | (United States) Phil Hellmuth | $1,600,000 |
| 5th | (United States) Matt Berkey | $1,100,000 |
| 6th | (United States) Bryn Kenney | $800,000 |
| 7th | (United States) Dan Shak | $600,000 |

=== Super High Roller Bowl III (2017) ===
- 5-Day Event: May 28-June 1
- Buy-in: $300,000
- Number of Entries: 56
- Total Prize Pool: $16,800,000
- Number of Payouts: 7
- Winning Hand: 10♠ 7♣

Final Table
| Place | Name | Prize |
|---|---|---|
| 1st | (Germany) Christoph Vogelsang | $6,000,000 |
| 2nd | (United States) Jake Schindler | $3,600,000 |
| 3rd | (Germany) Stefan Schillhabel | $2,400,000 |
| 4th | (Czech Republic) Leon Tsoukernik | $1,800,000 |
| 5th | (United States) Byron Kaverman | $1,400,000 |
| 6th | (United States) Pratyush Buddiga | $1,000,000 |
| 7th | (United States) Justin Bonomo | $600,000 |

=== Super High Roller Bowl China (March 2018) ===
- 3-Day Event: March 20–22
- Buy-in: $267,637
- Number of Entries: 75
- Total Prize Pool: $18,542,370
- Number of Payouts: 11
- Winning Hand: 7♦ 5♦

Final Table
| Place | Name | Prize |
|---|---|---|
| 1st | (United States) Justin Bonomo | $4,821,516 |
| 2nd | (Finland) Patrik Antonius | $3,152,434 |
| 3rd | (Germany) Rainer Kempe | $2,039,806 |
| 4th | (Germany) Dominik Nitsche | $1,668,932 |
| 5th | (United States) Bryn Kenney | $1,483,495 |
| 6th | (England) Stephen Chidwick | $1,298,058 |
| 7th | (United States) David Peters | $1,112,621 |
| 8th | (United States) Isaac Haxton | $927,205 |
| 9th | (United States) Jason Koon | $741,764 |
| 10th | (United States) Daniel Cates | $741,764 |
| 11th | (United States) Dan Smith | $556,331 |

=== Super High Roller Bowl IV (May 2018) ===
- 4-Day Event: May 27-30
- Buy-in: $300,000
- Number of Entries: 48
- Total Prize Pool: $14,400,000
- Number of Payouts: 7
- Winning Hand: 9♠ 9♦

Final Table
| Place | Name | Prize |
|---|---|---|
| 1st | (United States) Justin Bonomo | $5,000,000 |
| 2nd | (Canada) Daniel Negreanu | $3,000,000 |
| 3rd | (United States) Jason Koon | $2,100,000 |
| 4th | (Belarus) Mikita Badziakouski | $1,600,000 |
| 5th | (Germany) Christoph Vogelsang | $1,200,000 |
| 6th | (United States) Nick Petrangelo | $900,000 |
| 7th | (United Kingdom) Stephen Chidwick | $600,000 |

=== Super High Roller Bowl V (December 2018) ===
- 3-Day Event: December 17-19
- Buy-in: $300,000
- Number of Entries: 36
- Total Prize Pool: $10,800,000
- Number of Payouts: 7
- Winning Hand: K♠ J♥

Final Table
| Place | Name | Prize |
|---|---|---|
| 1st | (United States) Isaac Haxton | $3,672,000 |
| 2nd | (United States) Alex Foxen | $2,160,000 |
| 3rd | (United Kingdom) Stephen Chidwick | $1,512,000 |
| 4th | (United Kingdom) Talal Shakerchi | $1,188,000 |
| 5th | (Spain) Adrián Mateos | $972,000 |
| 6th | (Russia) Igor Kurganov | $756,000 |
| 7th | (Bosnia and Herzegovina) Ali Imsirovic | $540,000 |

=== Super High Roller Bowl London (September 2019) ===
- 2-Day Event: September 13-14
- Buy-in: $312,650
- Number of Entries: 12
- Total Prize Pool: $3,729,024
- Number of Payouts: 2
- Winning Hand: Q♠ 3♠

Final Table
| Place | Name | Prize |
|---|---|---|
| 1st | (United States) Cary Katz | $2,610,317 |
| 2nd | (Bosnia and Herzegovina) Ali Imsirovic | $1,118,707 |

=== Super High Roller Bowl Bahamas (November 2019) ===
- 3-Day Event: November 16-18
- Buy-in: $250,000
- Number of Entries: 51
- Total Prize Pool: $12,750,000
- Number of Payouts: 8
- Winning Hand: A♦ 9♦

Final Table
| Place | Name | Prize |
|---|---|---|
| 1st | (Canada) Daniel Dvoress | $4,080,000 |
| 2nd | (China) Wai Leong Chan | $2,677,500 |
| 3rd | (United States) Kathy Lehne | $1,785,000 |
| 4th | (United States) Erik Seidel | $1,275,000 |
| 5th | (United States) Seth Davies | $1,020,000 |
| 6th | (United States) Steve O'Dwyer | $765,000 |
| 7th | (United States) Jason Koon | $637,500 |
| 8th | (United States) Justin Bonomo | $510,000 |

=== Super High Roller Bowl Australia (February 2020) ===
- 2-Day Event: February 2-3
- Buy-in: $167,230
- Number of Entries: 16
- Total Prize Pool: $2,677,986
- Number of Payouts: 3
- Winning Hand: A♥ 9♥

Final Table
| Place | Name | Prize |
|---|---|---|
| 1st | (Canada) Timothy Adams | $1,446,112 |
| 2nd | (Australia) Kahle Burns | $803,396 |
| 3rd | (United States) Cary Katz | $428,478 |

=== Super High Roller Bowl Russia (March 2020) ===
- 3-Day Event: March 13 - 15
- Buy-in: $250,000
- Number of Entries: 40
- Total Prize Pool: $10,000,000
- Number of Payouts: 6
- Winning Hand: A♥ 9♠

Final Table
| Place | Name | Prize |
|---|---|---|
| 1st | (Canada) Timothy Adams | $3,600,000 |
| 2nd | (Germany) Christoph Vogelsang | $2,400,000 |
| 3rd | (Belarus) Mikita Badziakouski | $1,600,000 |
| 4th | (United Kingdom) Ben Heath | $1,000,000 |
| 5th | (Spain) Adrián Mateos | $800,000 |
| 6th | (Malaysia) Ivan Leow | $600,000 |

=== Super High Roller Bowl Online (June 2020) ===
- 2-Day Event: June 1 - 2
- Buy-in: $102,000
- Number of Entries: 50
- Total Prize Pool: $5,000,000
- Number of Payouts: 7
- Winning Hand: K♥ 5♦

Final Table
| Place | Name | Prize |
|---|---|---|
| 1st | (United States) Justin Bonomo | $1,775,000 |
| 2nd | (Australia) Michael Addamo | $1,187,000 |
| 3rd | (United States) David Peters | $762,500 |
| 4th | (Finland) Pauli Ayras | $487,500 |
| 5th | (United States) Dan Shak | $325,000 |
| 6th | (Switzerland) Linus Loeliger | $250,000 |
| 7th | (Canada) Sam Greenwood | $212,500 |

=== Super High Roller Bowl Europe (August 2021) ===
- 3-Day Event: August 30-September 1
- Buy-in: $250,000
- Number of Entries: 41
- Total Prize Pool: $10,250,000
- Number of Payouts: 6
- Winning Hand: 9♠ 8♦

Final Table
| Place | Name | Prize |
|---|---|---|
| 1st | (Poland) Wiktor Malinowski | $3,690,000 |
| 2nd | (Malaysia) Ivan Leow | $2,460,000 |
| 3rd | (United States) Zhuang Ruan | $1,640,000 |
| 4th | (Canada) Timothy Adams | $1,127,500 |
| 5th | (United States) David Peters | $820,000 |
| 6th | (Russia) Viacheslav Buldygin | $512,500 |

=== Super High Roller Bowl VI (September 2021) ===
- 3-Day Event: September 27-29
- Buy-in: $300,000
- Number of Entries: 21
- Total Prize Pool: $6,300,000
- Number of Payouts: 3
- Winning Hand: 7♦ 2♦

Final Table
| Place | Name | Prize |
|---|---|---|
| 1st | (Australia) Michael Addamo | $3,402,000 |
| 2nd | (United States) Justin Bonomo | $1,890,000 |
| 3rd | (United States) Sean Winter | $1,008,000 |

=== Super High Roller Bowl Europe (April 2022) ===
- 3-Day Event: April 13-15
- Buy-in: $250,000
- Number of Entries: 32
- Total Prize Pool: $8,000,000
- Number of Payouts: 5
- Winning Hand: Q♣ J♥

Final Table
| Place | Name | Prize |
|---|---|---|
| 1st | (United States) Jake Schindler | $3,200,000 |
| 2nd | (Malaysia) Paul Phua | $2,080,000 |
| 3rd | (Germany) Christoph Vogelsang | $1,280,000 |
| 4th | (Canada) Timothy Adams | $880,000 |
| 5th | (Netherlands) Teun Mulder | $560,000 |

=== Super High Roller Bowl VII (October 2022) ===
- 3-Day Event: October 5-7
- Buy-in: $300,000
- Number of Entries: 24
- Total Prize Pool: $7,200,000
- Number of Payouts: 4
- Winning Hand: Q♣ 7♣

Final Table
| Place | Name | Prize |
|---|---|---|
| 1st | (Canada) Daniel Negreanu | $3,312,000 |
| 2nd | (United States) Nick Petrangelo | $2,016,000 |
| 3rd | (United States) Andrew Lichtenberger | $1,152,000 |
| 4th | (United States) Justin Bonomo | $720,000 |

=== Super High Roller Bowl VIII (September 2023) ===
- 3-Day Event: September 28-30
- Buy-in: $300,000
- Number of Entries: 20
- Total Prize Pool: $6,000,000
- Number of Payouts: 4
- Winning Hand: 10♦ 7♣

Final Table
| Place | Name | Prize |
|---|---|---|
| 1st | (United States) Isaac Haxton | $2,760,000 |
| 2nd | (United States) Andrew Lichtenberger | $1,680,000 |
| 3rd | (United States) Stephen Chidwick | $960,000 |
| 4th | (United States) Jason Koon | $600,000 |

=== Super High Roller Bowl: Pot-Limit Omaha (October 2023) ===
- 3-Day Event: October 16-18
- Buy-in: $100,000
- Number of Entries: 38
- Total Prize Pool: $3,800,000
- Number of Payouts: 7
- Winning Hand: 9♥ 5♠ 3♥ 2♠

Final Table
| Place | Name | Prize |
|---|---|---|
| 1st | (United States) Jared Bleznick | $1,292,000 |
| 2nd | (United States) Isaac Haxton | $836,000 |
| 3rd | (United Kingdom) Stephen Chidwick | $570,000 |
| 4th | (United States) Isaac Kempton | $418,000 |
| 5th | (United States) Aaron Katz | $304,000 |
| 6th | (United States) Frank Crivello | $228,000 |
| 7th | (United States) Chino Rheem | $152,000 |

=== Super High Roller Bowl IX (August 2024) ===
- 3-Day Event: August 22-24
- Buy-in: $300,000
- Number of Entries: 24
- Total Prize Pool: $7,056,000
- Number of Payouts: 4
- Winning Hand: 8♦ 7♣

Final Table
| Place | Name | Prize |
|---|---|---|
| 1st | (United States) Seth Davies | $3,206,000 |
| 2nd | (Spain) Juan Pardo | $1,900,000 |
| 3rd | (United States) Jeremy Ausmus | $1,200,000 |
| 4th | (Germany) Leonard Maue | $750,000 |

=== Super High Roller Bowl Pot Limit Omaha (October 2024) ===
- 3-Day Event: October 24-26
- Buy-in: $100,000
- Number of Entries: 42
- Total Prize Pool: $4,200,000
- Number of Payouts: 7
- Winning Hand: A♥ J♠ 6♠ 4♣

Final Table
| Place | Name | Prize |
|---|---|---|
| 1st | (United States) Seth Davies | $1,500,000 |
| 2nd | (Russia) Artem Maksimov | $900,000 |
| 3rd | (United States) Sean Winter | $600,000 |
| 4th | (United States) Jared Bleznick | $450,000 |
| 5th | (United States) Josh Arieh | $330,000 |
| 6th | (United States) Sam Soverel | $250,000 |
| 7th | (United States) Ben Tollerene | $170,000 |

=== Super High Roller Bowl Mixed Games (March 2025) ===
- 3-Day Event: March 6-8
- Buy-in: $100,000
- Number of Entries: 29
- Total Prize Pool: $2,900,000
- Number of Payouts: 5
- Winning Hand: K♣ J♦

Final Table
| Place | Name | Prize |
|---|---|---|
| 1st | (United States) Chad Eveslage | $1,200,000 |
| 2nd | (United States) Michael Moncek | $725,000 |
| 3rd | (Brazil) Yuri Dzivielevski | $450,000 |
| 4th | (Canada) Daniel Negreanu | $300,000 |
| 5th | (United Kingdom) Benny Glaser | $225,000 |

=== Super High Roller Bowl Pot Limit Omaha (October 2025) ===
- 3-Day Event: October 27-29
- Buy-in: $100,000
- Number of Entries: 37
- Total Prize Pool: $3,700,000
- Number of Payouts: 7
- Winning Hand: A♣ K♣ 10♠ 7♠

Final Table
| Place | Name | Prize |
|---|---|---|
| 1st | (United States) John Riordan | $1,250,000 |
| 2nd | (United States) Sam Soverel | $825,000 |
| 3rd | (Brazil) Joao Simao | $550,000 |
| 4th | (Finland) Joni Jouhkimainen | $400,000 |
| 5th | (Russia) Artur Martirosyan | $300,000 |
| 6th | (United States) Bryce Yockey | $225,000 |
| 7th | (United States) Jared Bleznick | $150,000 |

=== Super High Roller Bowl X (December 2025) ===
- 3-Day Event: December 20-22
- Buy-in: $100,000
- Number of Entries: 23
- Total Prize Pool: $2,300,000
- Number of Payouts: 4
- Winning Hand: 8♦ 8♣

Final Table
| Place | Name | Prize |
|---|---|---|
| 1st | (Brazil) Joao Simao | $1,100,000 |
| 2nd | (United States) Jason Koon | $650,000 |
| 3rd | (United States) Sam Soverel | $350,000 |
| 4th | (United States) Nick Schulman | $200,000 |

=== Super High Roller Bowl Mixed Games (February 2026) ===
- 3-Day Event: February 12-14
- Buy-in: $100,000
- Number of Entries: 38
- Total Prize Pool: $3,800,000
- Number of Payouts: 7
- Winning Hand: A♠ 2♣ 5♦ 6♥

Final Table
| Place | Name | Prize |
|---|---|---|
| 1st | (Brazil) Yuri Dzivielevski | $1,300,000 |
| 2nd | (United States) Chad Eveslage | $835,000 |
| 3rd | (United Kingdom) Benny Glaser | $570,000 |
| 4th | (United Kingdom) Robert Wells | $415,000 |
| 5th | (Norway) Tobias Leknes | $300,000 |
| 6th | (United States) Jared Bleznick | $225,000 |
| 7th | (United States) Nick Schulman | $155,000 |

=== Super High Roller Bowl Pot Limit Omaha (October 2026) ===
- 3-Day Event: October 5-7
- Buy-in: $100,000
- Number of Entries: 32
- Total Prize Pool: $3,200,000
- Number of Payouts: 6
- Winning Hand: A♣ 7♣ 7♠ 6♦

Final Table
| Place | Name | Prize |
|---|---|---|
| 1st | (United States) Sean Rafael | $1,150,000 |
| 2nd | (Brazil) Joao Simao | $775,000 |
| 3rd | (England) Richard Gryko | $480,000 |
| 4th | (England) Talal Shakerchi | $350,000 |
| 5th | (Spain) Lautaro Guerra | $255,000 |
| 6th | (Spain) Cesar Garcia | $190,000 |

=== Super High Roller Bowl XI (October 2026) ===
- 3-Day Event: October 8-10
- Buy-in: $100,000
- Number of Entries: 28
- Total Prize Pool: $2,800,000
- Number of Payouts: 5
- Winning Hand: Q♠ 10♠

Final Table
| Place | Name | Prize |
|---|---|---|
| 1st | (United States) Brandon Wilson | $1,125,000 |
| 2nd | (United States) Nick Petrangelo | $700,000 |
| 3rd | (United States) Alex Foxen | $450,000 |
| 4th | (United States) Jeremy Ausmus | $310,000 |
| 5th | (Spain) Adrian Mateos | $215,000 |
