= Wiktor Malinowski =

Polish poker player (born 1994)

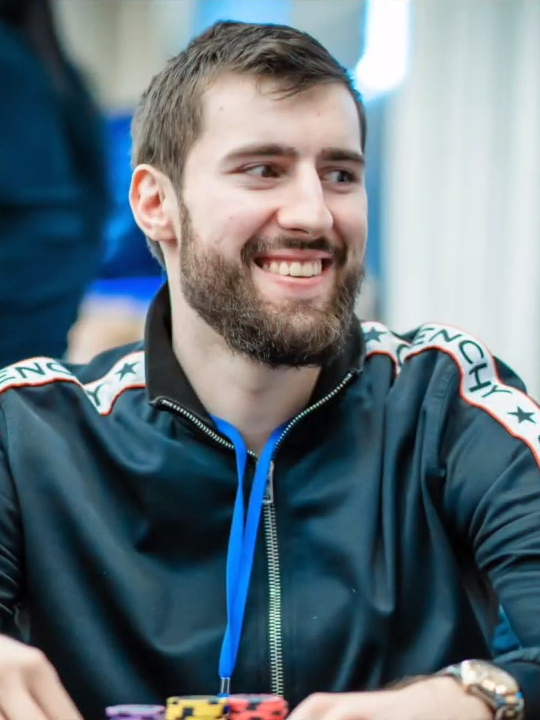
- Wiktor Malinowski 2020
- Nickname: Limitless
- Born: 2 August 1994 (age 32); Belarus

European Poker Tour
- Final table: 1
- Money finishes: 2

Wiktor Malinowski (born 2 August 1994) is a Polish professional poker player who has played in high stakes online no limit hold 'em (NLHE) cash games. He transitioned to the live poker tournament scene in 2019. He formerly played handball professionally.

== Career ==
Malinowski started playing poker seriously in 2014. He began playing freerolls and the lowest stakes offered for online cash games. Over the next two years, he managed to become a regular at mid to high stakes online cash games playing under the alias "limitless". In 2018, he won the World Championship of Online Poker $25K High Roller Turbo, winning $726,000 in the process.

While on Joey Ingram's podcast, Malinowski offered a "heads-up challenge to anyone, playing while drunk". In June 2020, Malinowski won the partypoker High Roller Club $25,500 Main Event winning $443,750 in the process.

In August 2020, Malinowski won a $842,438 pot from Michael Addamo while playing NLHE on the poker site Natural8. It became the largest online pot in NLHE history beating the previous record of $723,938 won by Di Dang against Tom Dwan in 2008. The record was beaten just a few days later when Bosnian-born poker player Almedin "Ali" Imsirovic won a pot worth $974,631 while playing NLHE online. Approximately one week later Malinowski won another pot worth $500,146 holding 7♥ 2♥ for a wheel.

In May 2021, Malinowski won his first title in GGPoker's weekly Super MILLION$ tournament. Later that month, GGPoker signed him as an ambassador for its newly launched Team Poland, part of the operator's expansion into the Polish market.

In 2021, he won the first place prize of $3,690,000 at the Super High Roller Bowl Europe held in North Cyprus Turkish Republic (North Cyprus) becoming No. 2 on Poland's all-time money list.

In May 2024, Malinowski won his first Triton title, taking down the $200,000 buy-in Super High Roller Series event in Montenegro for $4,789,000, defeating runner-up Adrian Mateos ($3,292,000) in a 93-entrant field.

In September 2025, Malinowski swept two heads-up cash-game matches against Ossi "Monarch" Ketola at the Triton Super High Roller Series in Jeju, winning a combined $6,000,000 across a $2,000,000 buy-in match and a $4,000,000 buy-in match played the same day.

As of 2026, Malinowski's total live tournament winnings exceed $13,680,000, the highest total on Poland's all-time money list.

== See also ==
- List of Poles
