= 2024 World Series of Poker Paradise =

Series of poker tournaments

- Location: Atlantis Paradise Island, The Bahamas
- Dates: December 6 - 19

Champion
- (China) Yinan Zhou

The 2024 World Series of Poker Paradise was the second edition of the poker festival organized by the World Series of Poker. It was held from December 6-19 at Atlantis Paradise Island in The Bahamas.

There were 15 bracelet events, culminating in the $25,000 Super Main Event which featured a $50 million guaranteed prize pool, the largest in poker history. The series also partnered with the Triton Poker Series and held the $1,000,000 Triton Millon and $100,000 Triton Main Event.

== Event schedule ==
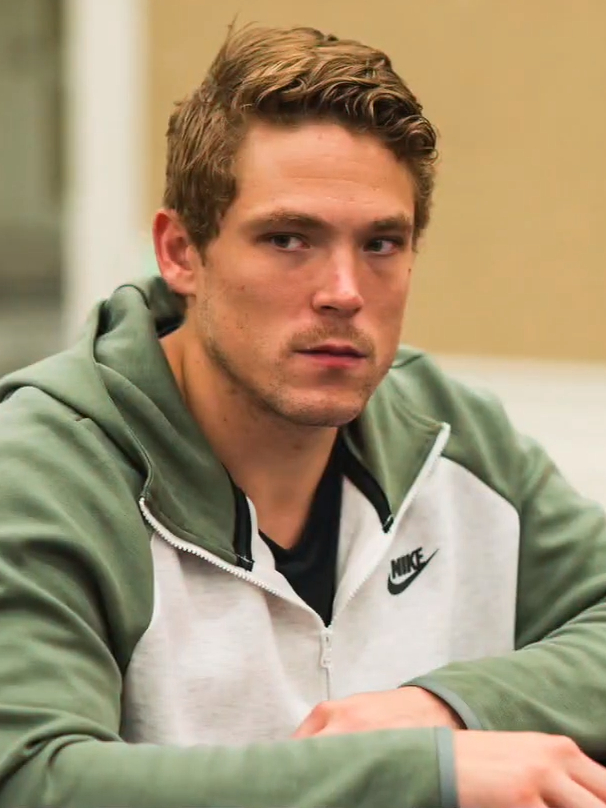
Alex Foxen won his third WSOP bracelet in Event 7

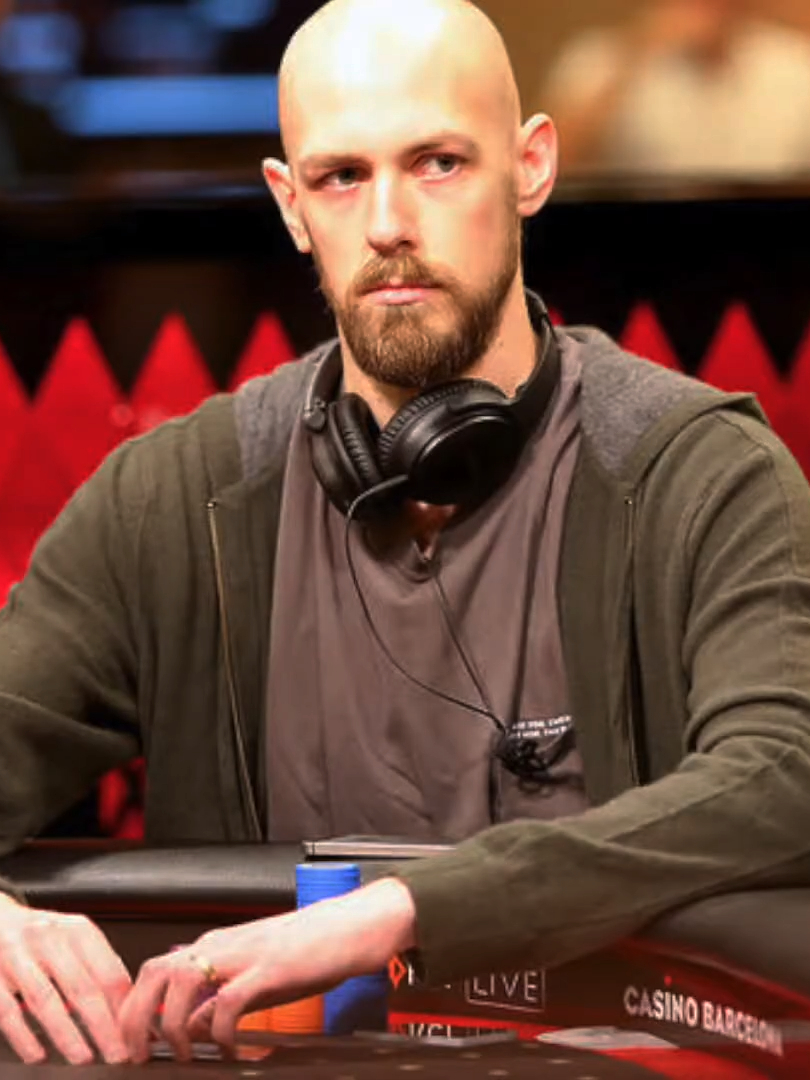
Stephen Chidwick won his second WSOP bracelet in Event 8

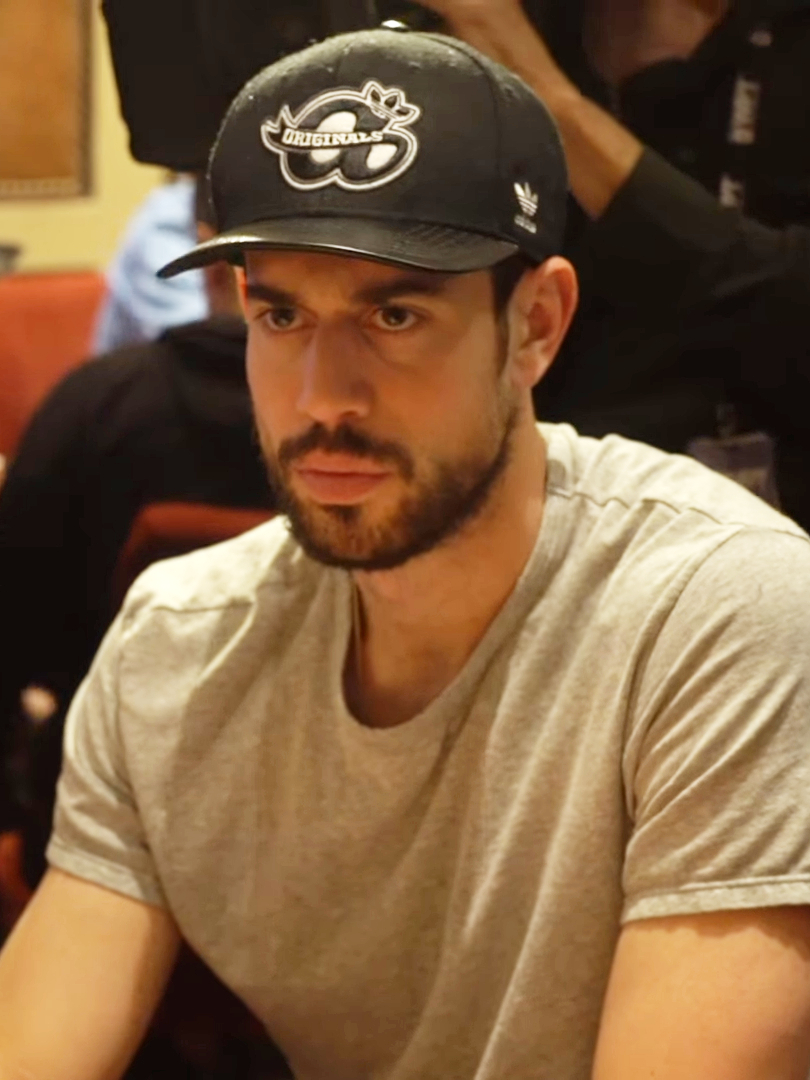
Nick Schulman won his 6th WSOP bracelet in Event 15

Online event.

#	Event	Entrants	Winner	Prize	Runner-up
1	$2,500 Mini Main Event	2,031	(Lebanon) Jeffrey Hakim (1/1)	$575,050	(Belarus) Alina Paliahoshka
2	$500,000 Triton Million Invitational	96	(Argentina) Alejandro Lococo (1/1)	$12,070,000	(United Kingdom) Ben Heath (0/1)
3	$100,000 Pot-Limit Omaha Super High Roller	88	(Spain) Lautaro Guerra (1/1)	$2,126,770	(United States) Ben Tollerene
4	$2,500 GGMasters Online Championship	813	(Brazil) Matheus Machado (1/1)	$432,624	(Russia) Andrey Pateychuk
5	$25,000 Dealers Choice Championship	49	(United States) Eric Wasserson (1/1)	$353,340	(United States) Josh Arieh (0/6)
6	$5,000 Deepstack No-Limit Hold'em	363	(China) Lei Yu (1/1)	$293,050	(Slovenia) Blaz Zerjav
7	$100,000 Triton Main Event	182	(United States) Alex Foxen (2/3)	$3,850,000	(Portugal) Joao Vieira (0/3)
8	$50,000 Pot-Limit Omaha Championship	122	(United Kingdom) Stephen Chidwick (1/2)	$1,357,080	(China) Yang Wang
9	$25,000 Super Main Event	1,978	(China) Yinan Zhou (1/1)	$6,000,000	(Brazil) Marcelo Aziz
10	$10,000 Paradise Pot-Limit Omaha	200	(Russia) Mike Gorodinsky (1/4)	$393,250	(United States) Daniel Zack (0/3)
11	$2,500 Mystery Millions Online	2,185	(France) Axel Bayout (1/1)	$532,042	(China) Ren Lin
12	$10,000 GGMillion$ Championship	532	(Netherlands) Johannes Straver (1/1)	$807,430	(Spain) Jon Vallinas
13	$50,000 No-Limit Hold'em High Roller	130	(Germany) Tom Fuchs (1/1)	$1,292,000	(South Korea) Moonho Seo
14	Super Saver $1M Invitational	487	(Brazil) Pablo Brito Silva (1/1)	$200,000	(United Kingdom) Matthew Belcher
15	$5,000 The Closer No-Limit Hold'em Bounty Turbo	238	(United States) Nick Schulman (2/6)	$145,000	(China) Ren Lin

== Super Main Event ==
The $25,000 Super Main Event began on December 12 with the first of four starting flights. There were also three starting flights held online on GGPoker.

The event had a $50,000,000 guaranteed prize pool and drew 1,978 total entries. The top 297 players made the money, with the champion earning $6,000,000.

Yinan Zhou, a 24-year-old from China, won his first WSOP bracelet and became the first WSOP Main Event champion based in Asia. Marcelo Aziz of Brazil, who qualified for the event in an online freeroll, finished as the runner-up for $4,600,000.

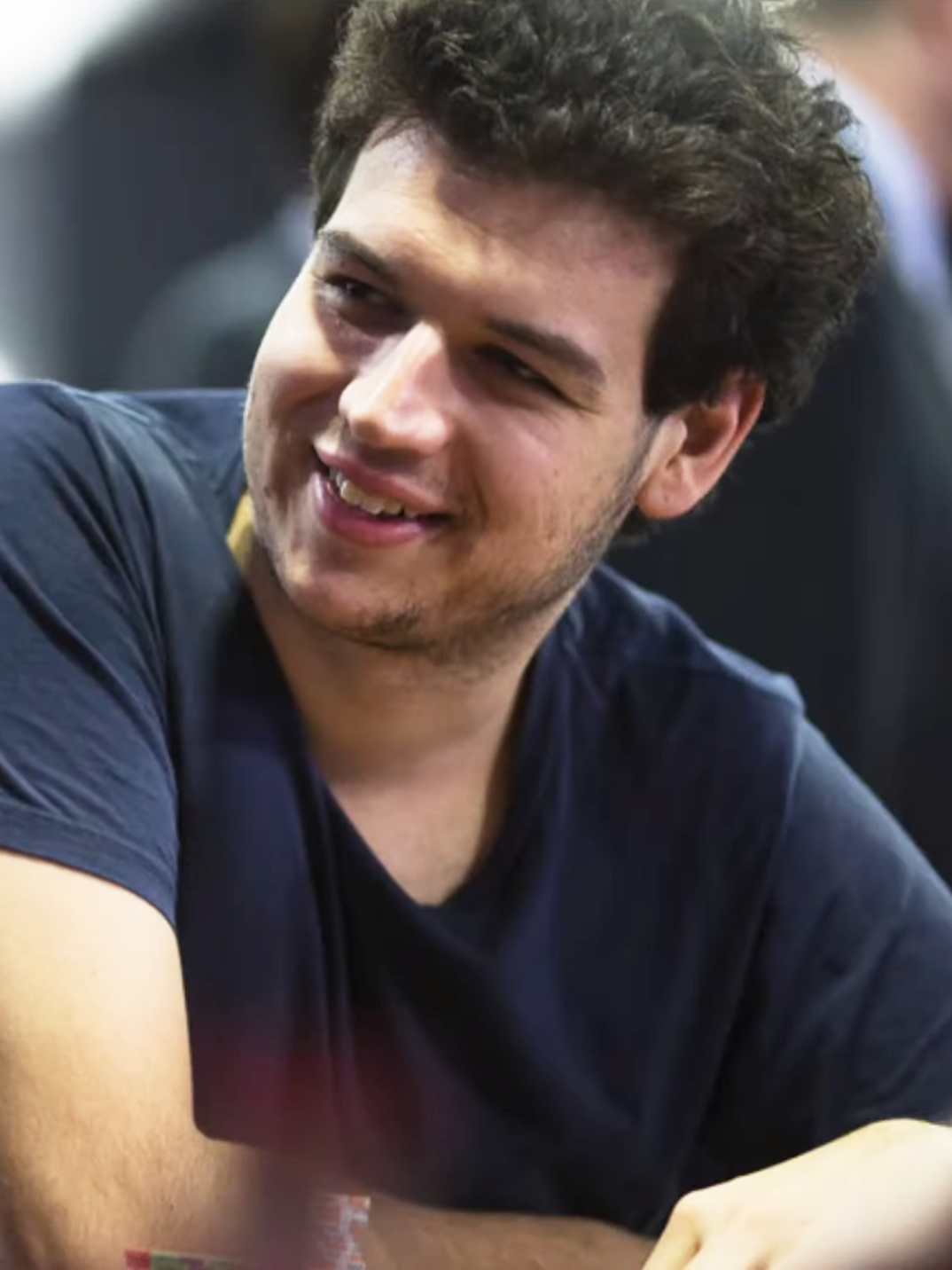
Michael Addamo began the final table as chip leader before finishing in sixth place

=== Final Table ===
Name	Number of chips (percentage of total)	WSOP Bracelets	WSOP Cashes*	WSOP Earnings*
(Australia) Michael Addamo	196,800,000 (20.4%)	4	43	$6,802,352
(Austria) Christopher Nguyen	143,100,000 (14.8%)	0	8	$51,626
(Italy) Mustapha Kanit	141,200,000 (14.6%)	0	42	$1,344,742
(United Kingdom) Liv Boeree	111,400,000 (11.6%)	1	28	$424,741
(Brazil) Marcelo Aziz	105,500,000 (10.9%)	0	32	$123,954
(China) Yinan Zhou	88,000,000 (9.1%)	0	17	$186,288
(Belarus) Vadzim Lipauka	66,300,000 (6.9%)	0	34	$171,754
(United States) Justin Bonomo	63,400,000 (6.6%)	3	69	$16,060,363
(Germany) Georg Lehmann	48,400,000 (5.0%)	0	7	$63,791

*Career statistics before the 2024 Super Main Event

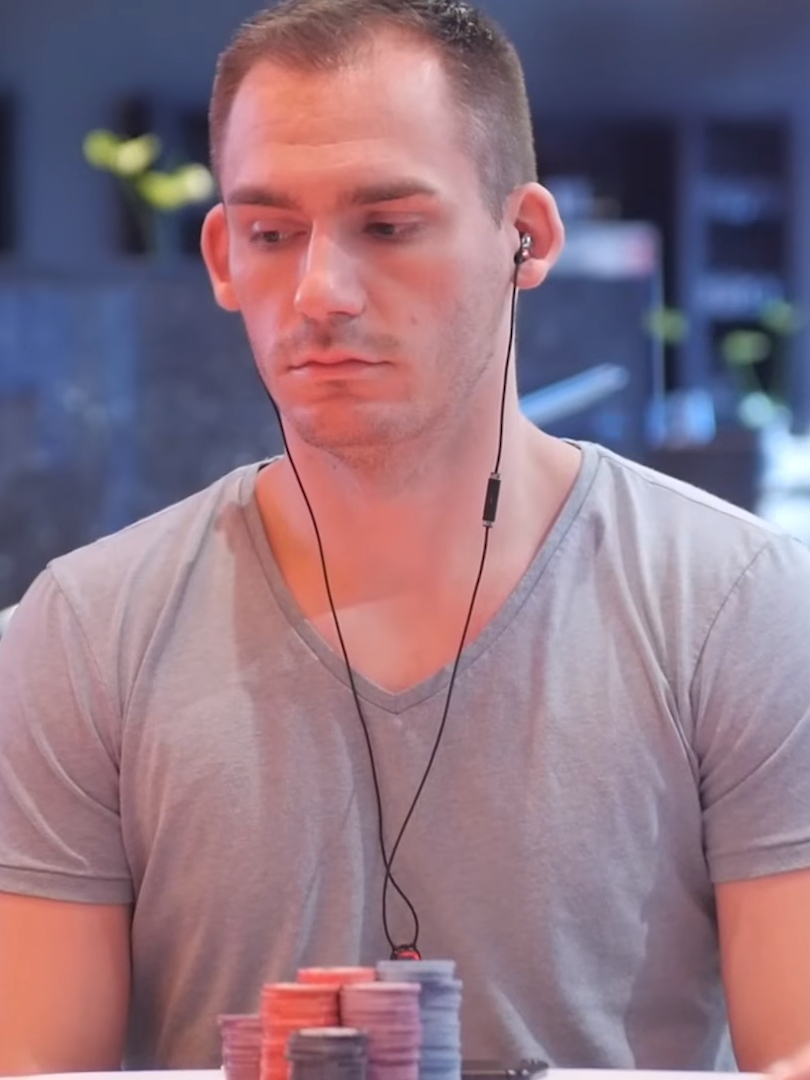
Justin Bonomo finished in seventh place in the Super Main Event

=== Final Table results ===
Place	Name	Prize
1st	(China) Yinan Zhou	$6,000,000
2nd	(Brazil) Marcelo Aziz	$4,600,000
3rd	(Italy) Mustapha Kanit	$3,600,000
4th	(United Kingdom) Liv Boeree	$2,800,000
5th	(Austria) Christopher Nguyen	$2,100,000
6th	(Australia) Michael Addamo	$1,650,000
7th	(United States) Justin Bonomo	$1,300,000
8th	(Belarus) Vadzim Lipauka	$1,000,000
9th	(Germany) Georg Lehmann	$750,000
