= Timofey Kuznetsov =

Russian poker player (born 1991)

- Nickname: Trueteller
- Born: 1991 (age 34–35)

Timofey Kuznetsov (born 1991) is a Russian professional poker player who specializes in online no-limit Texas hold 'em and pot-limit Omaha hold'em cash games.

== Poker career ==
Kuznetsov plays under the alias "Trueteller" on PokerStars and has earned over $2,400,000., as well as a further $2,050,000 under the same alias on the now defunct Full Tilt Poker. In November 2015, he played Phil Ivey in a 30-hour session. He won over $100,000 in two weeks playing online in March 2017.

Kuznetsov finished 4th in the 2015 $500,000 Super High Roller Bowl winning over $2,100,000.

In 2018, Kuznetsov along with Linus Loeliger and Jonas Mols, was ranked by poker player Andres "Educa-p0ker" Artinano as one of the top three 6-max no-limit hold 'em players in the world. In March 2018, Kuznetsov lost a $157,425.70 pot online after getting all the money in preflop holding A♦ A♣ against Mols who held K♦ K♠. They agreed to run the board twice. The first board ran out 3♥ K♣ 4♣ 2♦ 6♠ and the second board came 6♥ K♥ 9♦ 7♥ 3♠ giving the entire pot to Mols.

As of 2021, his total live tournament winnings exceed $8,600,000.
