= Sam Greenwood =

Sam Greenwood may refer to:

- Sam Greenwood (poker player) (born 1988), Canadian professional poker player
- Sam Greenwood (footballer) (born 2002), English footballer
