= Rainer Kempe =

German poker player (born 1989)

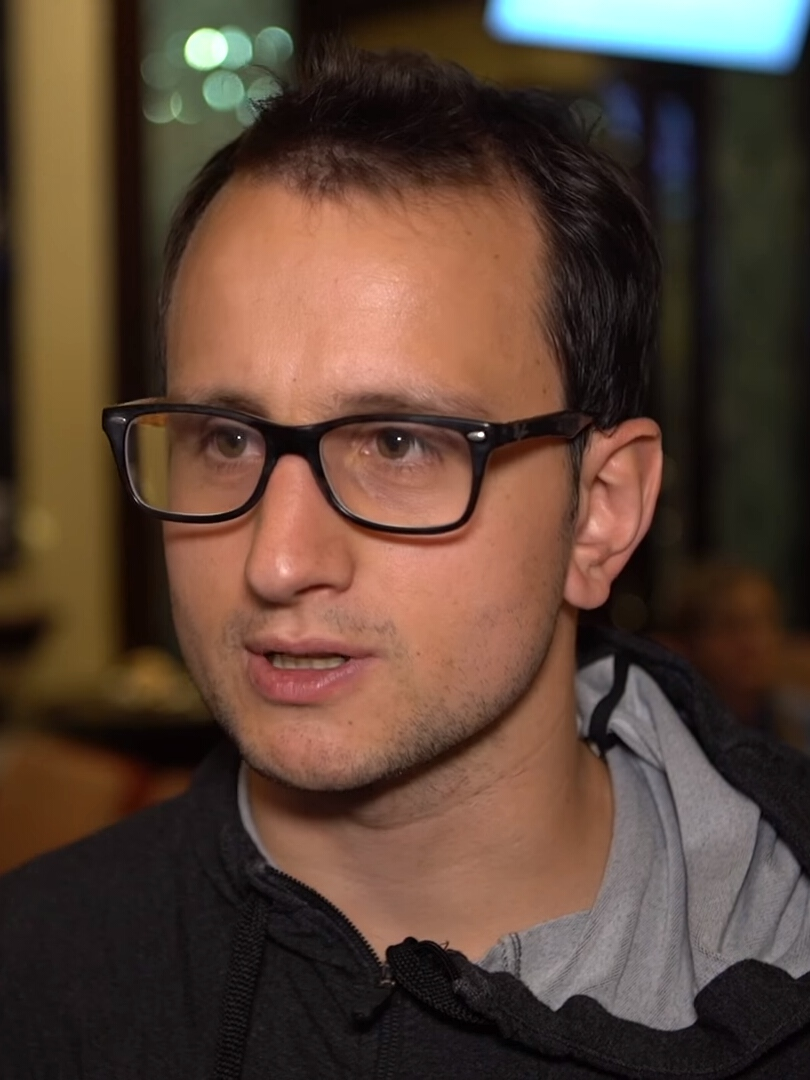
- Kempe in 2018
- Born: 24 July 1989 (age 37); Berlin, Germany

World Series of Poker
- Bracelet: 1
- Final tables: 2
- Money finishes: 40
- Highest WSOP Main Event finish: None

World Poker Tour
- Title: None
- Final tables: 2
- Money finishes: 10

European Poker Tour
- Titles: 2
- Final tables: 10
- Money finishes: 22

Rainer Kempe (born 24 July 1989) is a German professional poker player from Berlin, Germany.

== Poker career ==
Kempe began playing live poker tournaments in 2011. Kempe made small profits from 2011 to 2014.

In 2015, Kempe finished 5th at the European Poker Tour €5,000 No Limit Hold'em Main Event, winning €320,400. In December 2015, he won the EPT12 Prague €25,500 Single Day High Roller, winnings €539,000. In 2016, he won the $300,000 No Limit Hold'em event at the Super High Roller Bowl for $5 million.

In January 2019, Kempe won the $50,000 PokerStars Caribbean Adventure Single-Day High Roller, winning $908,100. During the same tournament series Kempe won the $10,200 No Limit Hold'em - KO Turbo (Event #41), taking down $117,280. Later in the month, Kempe won the Aussie Millions AU$25,000 challenge earning AU$831,465.

In 2025, Kempe won his first World Series of Poker bracelet, in the $10,000 Super Turbo Bounty event.

As of 2025, Kempe's live tournament winnings exceed $23,000,000. He is the fourth most successful German poker player.

== Gaming ==
Along with fellow poker players Stefan Schillhabel, Steffen Sontheimer, Fedor Holz, Manig Loeser, Rainer Kempe is part of the "No Limit Gaming group", which mixes poker players and video games players. They have a counterstrike and a league of legends team.

== Personal life ==
He attended the Rosa-Luxemburg-Gymnasium in Pankow and later studied at the University of Potsdam and the University of Sussex in Falmer, England. Kempe lives in Brighton.
