= Jonas Mols =

Belgian poker player

- Nickname: OtB_RedBaron
- Born: Belgium

Jonas Mols is a Belgian professional poker player who specializes in online no-limit Texas hold 'em (NLHE). Mols plays on PokerStars under the alias OtB_RedBaron.

== Poker career ==
Mols worked on his game by "reading and analyzing his game" until he improved. He reportedly earned between $4 and $5 million playing online tournaments and cash games at stakes below $25/$50. In 2012 on a thread at Two Plus Two Publishing, Mols documented his goal to play 100,000 hands on PokerStars' Zoom format at the highest stakes and achieve at least a 6 EV bb/100 win rate. He achieved a 3.9 EV bb/100 win rate on his first marathon and a 7 EV bb/100 win rate on his second attempt. Mols has been referred to as an online poker "boss". Professional poker player Andres "Educa-p0ker" Artinano, claimed observing Mols improved his own game play and ranked Mols along with Linus Loeliger and Timofey Kuznetsov as one of the top three 6-max no-limit hold 'em players in the world.

Mols played in the 2016 World Championship of Online Poker $102,000 Super High Roller where he was eliminated by eventual champion "bencb789".

In March 2018, Mols won a $157,425.70 pot online after getting all the money in preflop holding K♦ K♠ against Timofey Kuznetsov's A♦ A♣. They agreed to run the board twice. The first board ran out 3♥ K♣ 4♣ 2♦ 6♠ and the second board came 6♥ K♥ 9♦ 7♥ 3♠ giving the entire pot to Mols.

As of 2020, The online high stakes cash game database has 255,857 hands tracked on his PokerStars account. In that sample, Mols is up $2.093 million, which puts him in the top 30 biggest online cash winners in the site's database. His winnings come almost entirely from no-limit Texas hold 'em. In 2021, his total live tournament winnings exceeded $57,000.
