= PartyCasino =

Online Casino

- Company type: Public
- Industry: Online gambling
- Area served: Worldwide
- Products: Online casino, slots
- Owner: Entain
- Website: www.partycasino.com

PartyCasino is an online casino first launched in 1997 under the name Starluck Casino, before relaunching in 2006 as a fully integrated platform. The casino offers more than 500 games, ranging from casino like blackjack and roulette to a wide selection of online slots and live dealer experiences.

Following the 2011 merger of Party Gaming PLC and bwin Interactive Entertainment AG, PartyCasino became one of Gaming VC Holdings PLC's (GVC) leading casino brands. Entain operates four main product verticals, sports, casino, poker and bingo, along with other core brands such as CasinoClub, Betboo, Sportingbet, Bwin, partypoker, Foxy Bingo, and Gioco Digitale.

== History ==
PartyCasino was originally launched as Starluck Casino by Ruth Parasol under iGlobal Media. It went on to become one of the first successful online casinos in the late 1990s. Its early success led to the creation of PartyPoker (2001) and PartyBingo (2003). By 2005, PartyGaming was listed on the London Stock Exchange, valued at £4.64 billion, enough to secure a place in the FTSE100 Index.

In 2011, bwin Interactive Entertainment and PartyGaming completed their merger, creating the world's largest listed online gaming company.

In February 2016, GVC acquired bwin.party digital entertainment plc, the group is headquartered in the Isle of Man and has licenses in Austria, Belgium, Bulgaria, France, Italy, Denmark, Germany (Schleswig-Holstein), Spain, Malta, UK, South Africa, and the Dutch Caribbean.

In June 2017, PartyCasino relaunched to players with an all-new look and feel. The updated design – which was the result of an ongoing collaboration between PartyCasino employees and Leeds-based advertising agency, Home – did away with the site's previous cartoon style in favour of a more sophisticated approach, with photo-realistic imagery and lens flare lighting effects featuring prominently. As part of the rebrand, the PartyCasino logo was also updated – with the previously used lowercase font and dice graphic being ditched in favour of a more contemporary two-colour design.

In 2021, McLaren Racing announced a new multi-year partnership with Entain brands, PartyCasino and PartyPoker. The partnership was officially launched at the 2021 Monaco Grand Prix on May 23.
