= Sam Greenwood (poker player) =

Canadian poker player (born 1988)

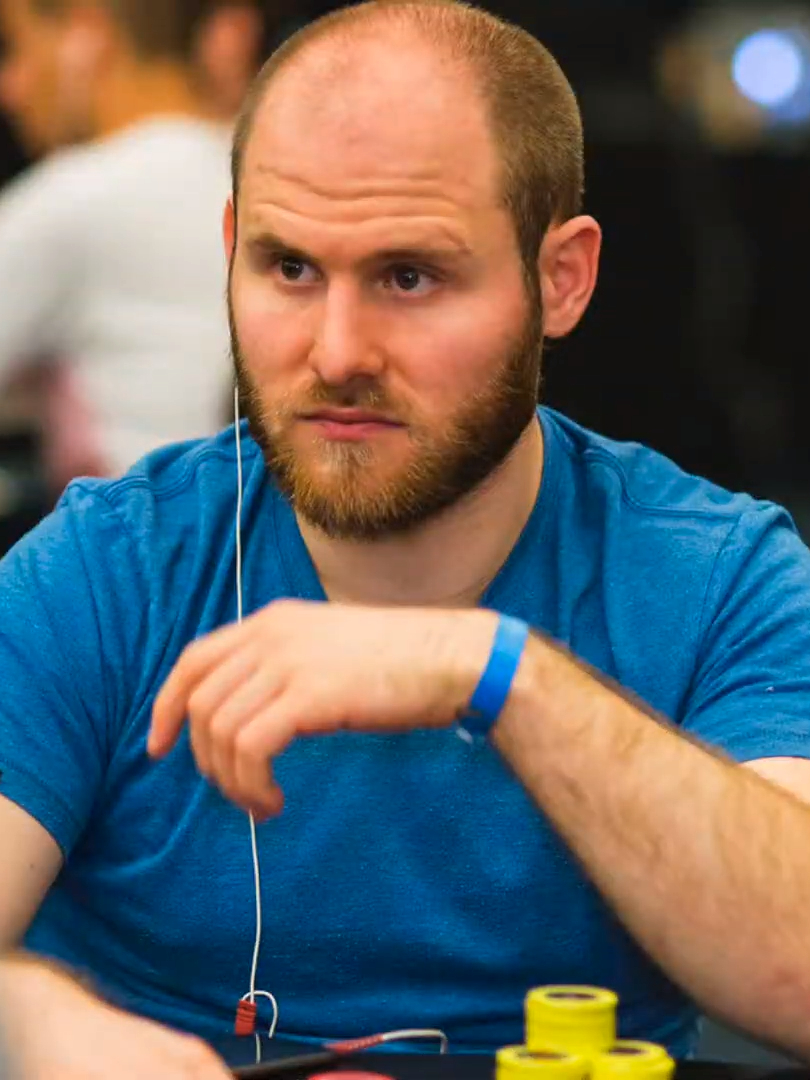
- Greenwood at 2016 WPT Caribbean
- Born: October 11, 1988 (age 38); Toronto, Ontario, Canada

World Series of Poker
- Bracelet: 1
- Money finishes: 22
- Highest WSOP Main Event finish: 45th, 2019

World Poker Tour
- Title: None
- Money finishes: 2

European Poker Tour
- Title: None
- Money finishes: 10

Sam Greenwood (born October 11, 1988) is a Canadian professional poker player from Toronto, Ontario, who used to work as a stock trader. He made his first high roller poker tournament score in the $97,000 No Limit Hold'em Super High Roller 8 Handed event at the 2015 PokerStars Caribbean Adventure tournament series.

== Poker ==
Sam Greenwood started playing online poker on PokerStars in 2006.

Greenwood plays online under the nicknames Str8$$$Homey on PokerStars, IfHeDiesHeDies on Full Tilt Poker, DeanMalenko on partypoker and FlatTopTony on 888poker. He has won over $6 million in online poker tournaments, with nearly $3.5 million on PokerStars and over $1 million on Full Tilt and partypoker. In September 2009, he won a title at the World Championship of Online Poker on PokerStars. In May 2013, he scored his highest online prize money by winning Event 22 $2,100 NL Hold'em in the Spring Championship of Online Poker on PokerStars winning $377,280.

Greenwood has been playing live tournaments since 2008. He won his first WSOP bracelet in the $1,000 No-Limit Hold'em Event at the 2015 World Series of Poker, winning $318,977.

In January 2019, Greenwood won the PokerStars Caribbean Adventure $100,000 Super High Roller event defeating Henrik Hecklen heads up and winning $1,775,460.

In September 2019, Sam Greenwood won the British Poker Open £10K Short Deck tournament, defeating Robert Flink heads up and winning £110,400.

As of December 2023, Greenwood has cashed for over $34,000,000 in live poker tournaments making him the third most successful Canadian poker player, behind Daniel Negreanu and Timothy Adams.

=== World Series of Poker Bracelets ===
Year	Tournament	Prize (US$)
2015	$1,000 No Limit Hold'em	$318,977

== Personal life ==
Greenwood lives in Toronto. His twin brother Lucas and older brother Max are also professional poker players.
