= Ole Schemion =

German poker player (born 1992)

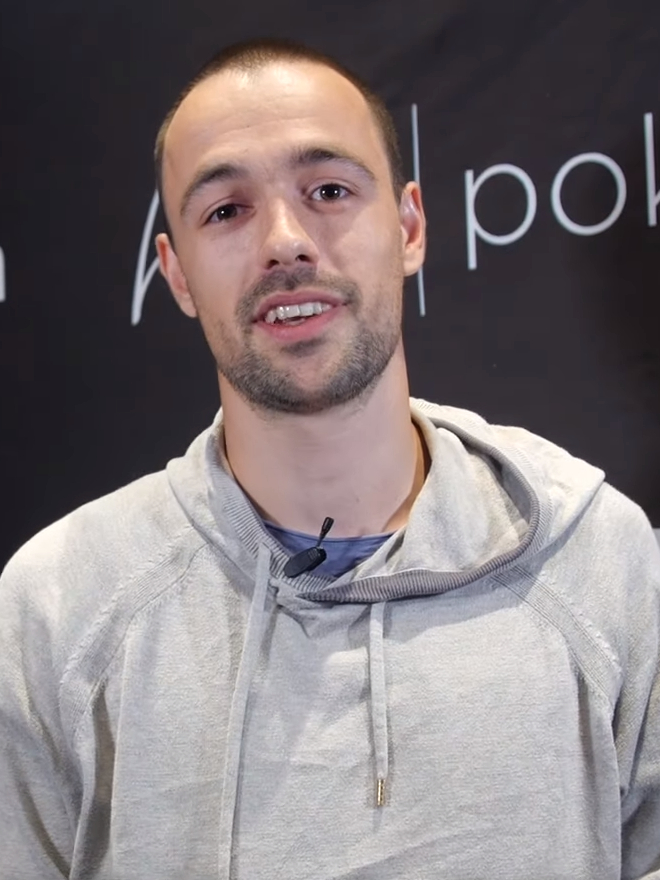
- Schemion in 2019
- Nickname: wizowizo
- Born: 12 September 1992 (age 34); Berlin, Germany
- Pokerisms: Hedonist Appraisal; Hedonist Approval
World Series of Poker
- Bracelet: 1
- Money finishes: 3
- Highest WSOP Main Event finish: None
World Poker Tour
- Titles: 2
- Final tables: 2
- Money finishes: 2
European Poker Tour
- Title: None
- Final tables: 2
- Money finishes: 9

Ole Schemion (born 12 September 1992) is a German professional poker player from Berlin, Germany. Schemion primarily plays in Europe.

== Poker ==
In 2011, Schemion won his first tournament at the age of 19, in one of the events during the European Poker Tour (EPT) Berlin. He has since won over 10 titles including the EPT Sanremo High Roller for $366,124. His largest cash winning was the 2016 € Super High Roller #16 in Monaco.

Success during the period of 2013-2015 earned Schemion the #1 position on the Global Poker Index (GPI), with 4083.21 points, in the January 2015 rankings. Schemion was the highest ranked player in open events for both 2013 and 2014. As of 2024, he is ranked 49th on the GPI, and he is in 6th place on the Germany All-Time Money List.

In 13 October 2019, Ole Schemion won the $1,050 Sunday Supersonic and $215 Sunday Warm-Up tournaments on the same evening.

He has had multiple success in online multi-table tournaments, under the alias “wizowizo”.

Schemion has live tournament winnings exceeding $20,200,000.

== Personal life ==
Schemion was born in Berlin, Germany and currently resides in Vienna, Austria.
