= Linus Loeliger =

Swiss poker player

- Nickname: LLinusLLove
- Born: c. 1994/1995

Linus Loeliger (born c. 1994/1995) is a Swiss professional poker player who specializes in online No Limit Texas hold 'em (NLHE) cash games. Loeliger focuses almost exclusively on no-limit hold 'em.

== Poker career ==
In 2013, Loeliger posted a challenge on Two Plus Two Publishing where he attempted to build a bankroll from $150 playing low stakes until he was properly rolled for $100NL. By the end of 2017, he was playing $200/$400 NLHE online.

Loeliger won the UKIPT £2,000 No Limit Hold'em event in April 2016 earning £55,650. The next month he began playing high stakes online poker on PokerStars under the alias "LLinusLLove". In February of 2018, Loeliger along with Timofey Kuznetsov and Jonas "OtB_RedBaron" Mols, was ranked by poker player Andres "Educa-p0ker" Artinano as one of the top three 6-max no-limit hold 'em players in the world. On 21 February 2018, Loeliger won $112,306 from cash games on PokerStars with a majority of his profits coming from OtB_RedBaron. In 2018, Loeliger won $699,973 from playing NLHE cash games between January and April of that year. He finished runner up to Michiel "utreg" Brummelhuis in the 2018 $2,100 NLHE SCOOP-21-H earning $145,314.66.

As of 2018, Loeliger has earned over $1,400,000 playing online poker. As of 2025, his total live tournament winnings exceed $9,100,000.
