= Timothy Adams (poker player) =

Canadian poker player (born 1986)

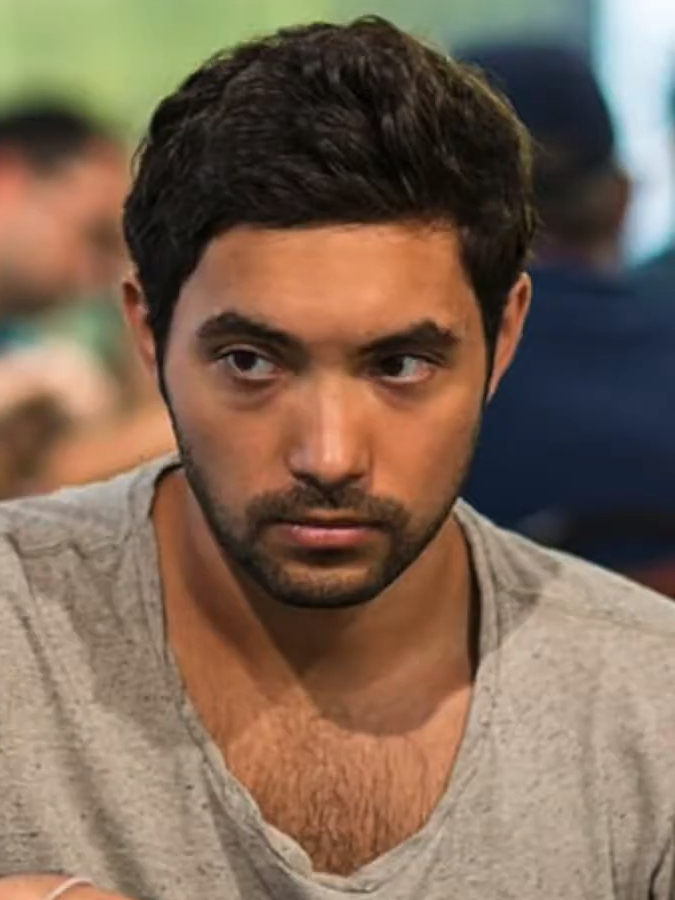
- Timothy Adams (2013)
- Born: June 4, 1986 (age 40); Burlington, Ontario

World Series of Poker
- Bracelet: 1
- Money finishes: 29
- Highest WSOP Main Event finish: 100th, 2012

World Poker Tour
- Money finishes: 3

European Poker Tour
- Money finishes: 6

Timothy Adams (born June 4, 1986) is a Canadian professional poker player from Burlington, Ontario who focuses on poker tournaments. He is currently the second biggest Canadian tournament winner in poker behind Daniel Negreanu.

== Career ==
Adams began playing poker when he was 18. He played online under the alias "Tim0thee" and earned approximately $530,000 on Full Tilt Poker and nearly $2,000,000 on PokerStars in online tournaments. His first WSOP was in 2007. He earned approximately $400,000 at the 2012 WSOP and won his first bracelet in the $2,500 No Limit Hold'em - Four Handed event.

In March 2019, Adams won the Triton Poker Super High Roller Series Jeju HKD 2,000,000 Main Event winning $3,536,550. Later that year, he successfully executed a huge bluff against Mikita Badziakouski at the WSOPE €250K Super High Roller, but did not cash.

From January to June 2020, Adams cashed in tournaments for approximately $5.9 million. In February 2020, Adams won Super High Roller Bowl Australia at The Star Gold Coast, and the following month he won the $250,000 Super High Roller Bowl Russia in Sochi for $3,600,000, becoming the second player to win back-to-back Super High Roller Bowl titles. He won the $10,300 NLH 6-Max for $243,988 at the partypoker 2020 Poker Masters high stakes tournament series which was hosted online due to the COVID-19 pandemic.

As of 2025, Adams' recorded live tournament earnings exceed $42,000,000.

In August 2023, Adams won the $125,000 buy-in Triton Poker Series London Main Event for $4,185,000, defeating Jean-Noël Thorel heads-up in a 151-entry field. The win was his second Triton Main Event title after Jeju in 2019, making him the third player to win two Triton Main Events.

== World Series of Poker ==
World Series of Poker bracelets
Year	Tournament	Prize (US$)
2012	$2,500 No Limit Hold'em - Four Handed	$392,476
