= Mustapha Kanit =

Italian poker player (born 1991)

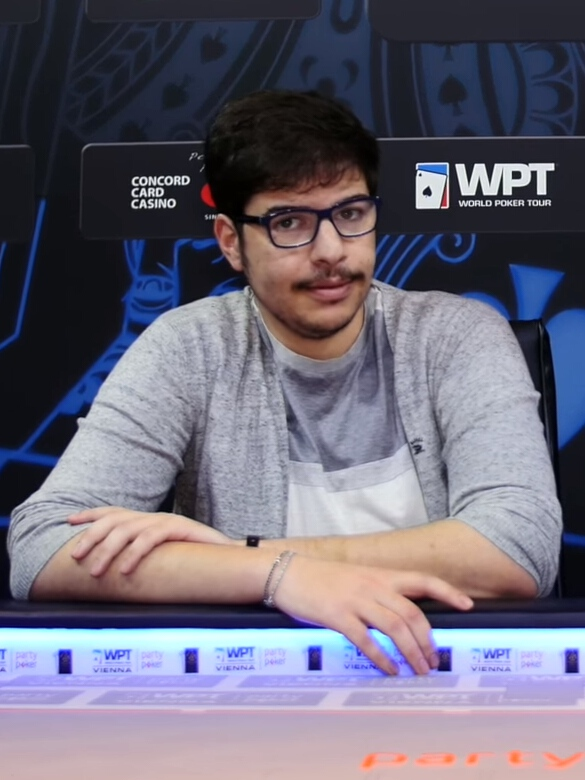
- Born: 24 January 1991 (age 35); Alessandria, Italy

World Series of Poker
- Bracelet: None
- Final tables: 3
- Money finishes: 9

World Poker Tour
- Title: None
- Final table: None
- Money finish: None

European Poker Tour
- Title: None
- Final table: None
- Money finishes: 4

Mustapha Kanit (born 24 January 1991) is an Italian professional poker player.

== Biography ==
Kanit was born in Alessandria, Italy and currently resides in London, United Kingdom.

He began playing poker as a teenager participating in live tournaments at private clubs. He worked at these clubs as a bartender and dealer. He later started playing in online poker under the alias lasagnaaammm.

== Poker career ==
Kanit overtook Max Pescatori on the Italian all time money list and is currently ranked 2nd behind Dario Sammartino. His results include thirteen cashes and two final tables at the WSOP winning $800,424, a 4th place finish in the High Roller PCA Bahamas, followed by two victories in the Aussie Millions in Melbourne.

Kanit won 13 March 2016 $215 PokerStars Sunday Million.

As of 2021, his career live tournament winnings exceed $11,500,000.
