= Adrián Mateos =

Spanish poker player (born 1994)

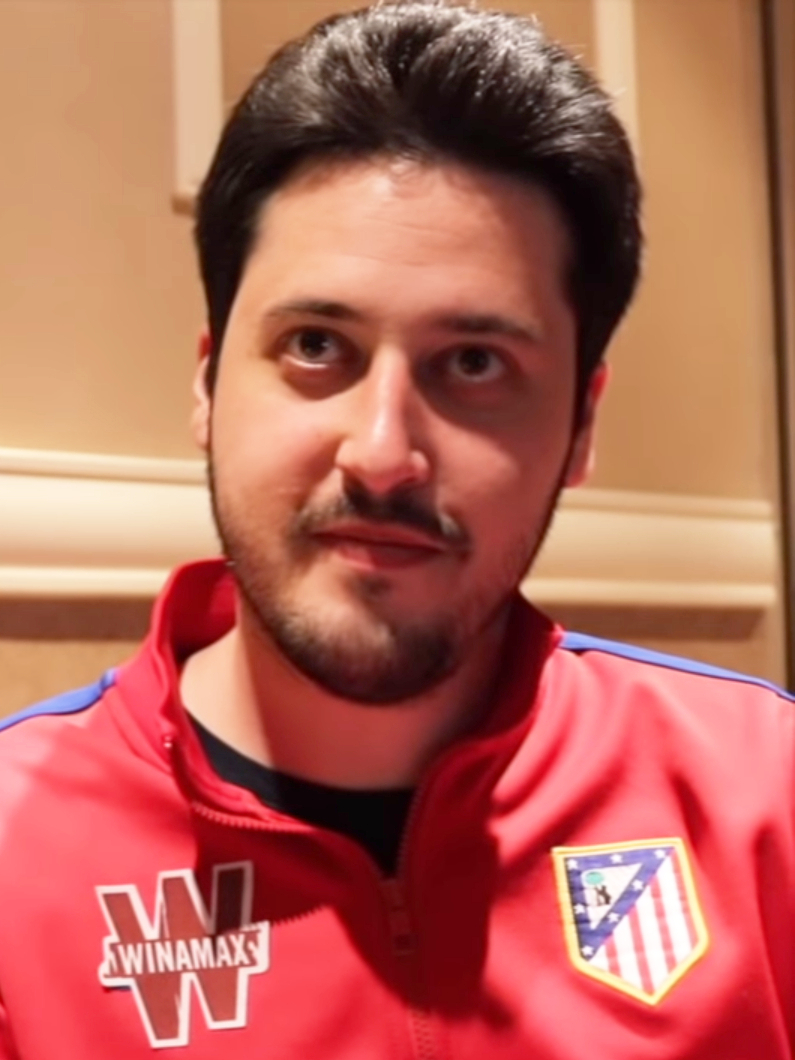
- Born: 1 July 1994 (age 32); San Martín de la Vega, Madrid, Spain

World Series of Poker
- Bracelets: 6
- Final tables: 19
- Money finishes: 97
- Highest WSOP Main Event finish: 317th, 2024

World Poker Tour
- Title: None
- Final table: 1
- Money finishes: 5

European Poker Tour
- Title: 1
- Final tables: 49
- Money finishes: 87

Adrián Mateos Díaz (born 1 July 1994) is a Spanish professional poker player. He has won six World Series of Poker (WSOP) bracelets and, in June 2026, became the youngest player to reach six, at the age of 31. A seven-time European Poker Tour (EPT) title holder and the 2017 Global Poker Index Player of the Year, he is regarded as one of the strongest tournament players of his era. As of october 2026, his live tournament earnings exceed US$70 million, ranking him fourth on the all-time money list.

== Early life ==
Mateos was born on 1 July 1994 in San Martín de la Vega, Spain, a town 30km south of Madrid. From the age of four until eighteen, he played tennis at a high level. When he was sixteen, he saw an episode of the European Poker Tour on television and was immediately captivated by the game. Being too young to play for money, he immersed himself in poker theory.

After secondary school, he began studying economics at the Charles III University of Madrid. He attended lectures in the morning and played at the casino in the afternoon. After winning more than €100,000 in early 2013, he left university in March of that year and moved to London, as regulations in Spain were unfavourable for pursuing a professional poker career.

== Career ==
=== 2013–2015: Breakthrough ===
In January 2013, Mateos won an Estrellas Poker Tour event in Madrid for €103,000. Later that year, aged 19, he won the 2013 World Series of Poker Europe Main Event for €1,000,000, becoming the second-youngest player to win a WSOP bracelet after Annette Obrestad. In May 2015, he won the EPT Grand Final Main Event in Monte Carlo for €1,082,000, becoming the first Spanish EPT champion; the run earned him the nickname "The Closer".

=== 2016–2021: Multiple bracelets ===
Mateos won his second bracelet at the 2016 WSOP ($1,500 Summer Solstice, $409,171) and his third at the 2017 WSOP ($10,000 Heads-Up Championship, $335,656); the latter made him, at 22, the youngest player to win three WSOP bracelets. He was named the 2017 Global Poker Index Player of the Year, edging Bryn Kenney by less than one cash, and also won Card Player's 2017 Player of the Year award. He won his fourth bracelet at the 2021 WSOP ($250,000 Super High Roller, $3,265,362).

=== 2022–2026: Super high roller success ===
Mateos recorded the highest live tournament earnings of any player in 2024, more than $13 million, finished October 2024 ranked number one in the world by the Global Poker Index, and won Card Player's 2024 Player of the Year award. He won his fifth bracelet, and first in an online event, at the 2025 WSOP ($3,200 High Roller, $253,080), becoming the fifth-youngest player to win five bracelets. In May 2026, he won the Triton Poker Montenegro Invitational, a $200,000 buy-in event with a record 137 entries, for a career-best $6,370,000. The following month he won his sixth bracelet at the 2026 WSOP, defeating Bryn Kenney heads-up in the $250,000 Super High Roller for $4,334,411 and becoming, at 31, the youngest player to win six bracelets.

=== World Series of Poker bracelets ===
Year	Event	Prize Money
2013 E	€10,450 No Limit Hold'em Main Event	€1,000,000
2016	$1,500 Summer Solstice No Limit Hold'em	$409,171
2017	$10,000 No Limit Hold'em Heads Up Championship	$335,656
2021	$250,000 Super High Roller No Limit Hold'em	$3,265,362
2025 O	$3,200 High Roller No Limit Hold'em	$253,080
2026	$250,000 Super High Roller No Limit Hold'em	$4,334,411

An "E" following a year denotes bracelet(s) won at the World Series of Poker Europe. An "O" following a year denotes bracelet(s) won at the World Series of Poker Online.

=== Triton Poker Series ===
Festival	Tournament	Prize
Jeju 2024	$30,000 No Limit Hold'em 8-Handed	$1,175,000
Montenegro 2024	$50,000 No Limit Hold'em 8-Handed	$1,761,000
Montenegro 2026	$200,000 No Limit Hold'em Invitational	$6,370,000

=== PokerGO Tour titles ===
Year	Tournament	Prize
2021	ARIA High Roller #24 – $10,000 NLH	$113,199
2021	WSOP #82 – $250,000 Super High Roller	$3,265,362
2022	ARIA High Roller #23 – $10,000 NLH	$50,000
2023	ARIA High Roller #12 – $25,200 NLH	$216,000
2024	Super High Roller Series #6 – $25,750 NLH Mystery Bounty 6-Max	$162,000

== Online poker ==
Mateos plays online under the screen name "Amadi_017". On PokerStars he has won five Spring Championship of Online Poker (SCOOP) titles and five World Championship of Online Poker (WCOOP) titles, including four during the 2020 WCOOP series, one of them the $25,000 Super High Roller, in which he defeated Fedor Holz for $543,686. In March 2021, he won the 42nd edition of the GGPoker Super MILLION$ for $428,624.

== Sponsorship and reputation ==
Mateos is a Winamax Team Pro and won the Winamax SISMIX Main Event in Marrakesh in 2018. He is widely regarded as one of the best tournament players in the world; after his 2026 Triton and WSOP victories, PokerNews questioned whether he had proven himself the best tournament player in poker.
