= Christoph Vogelsang =

German poker player (born 1985)

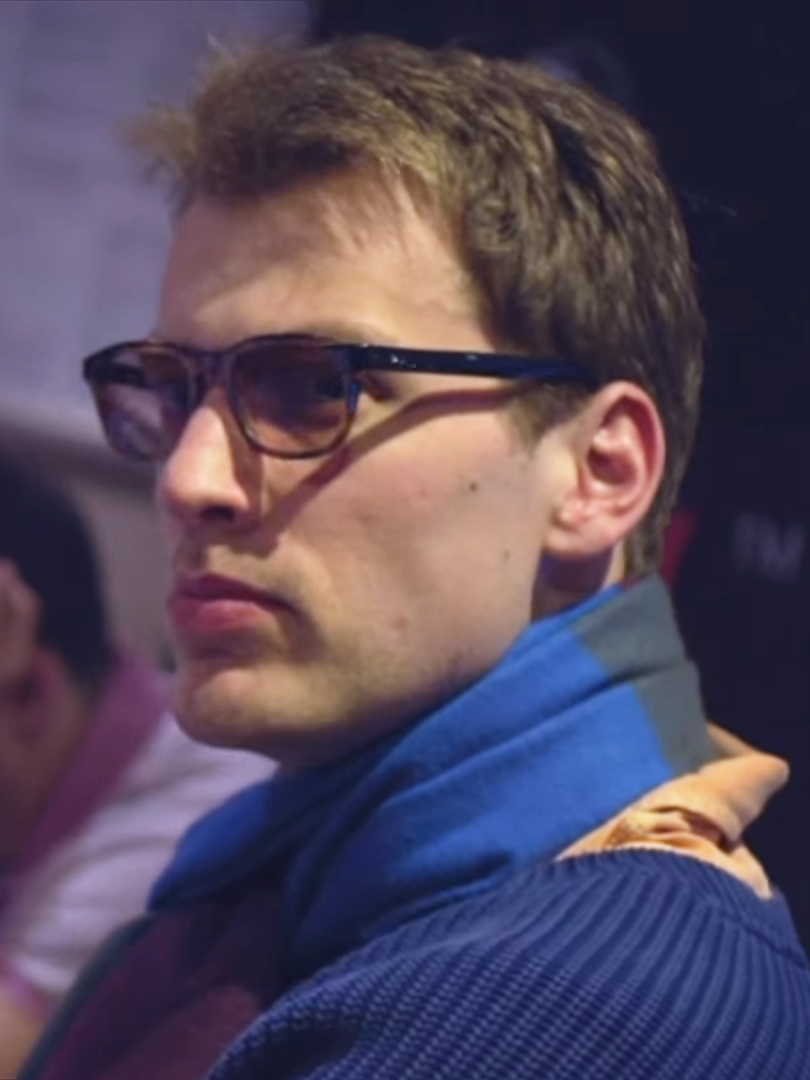
- Christoph Vogelsang in 2015
- Nicknames: Tight-Man1; 26071985
- Born: 26 July 1985 (age 41)
- Division: Probability Equalizer Interface
World Series of Poker
- Bracelet: None
- Final tables: 10 (including unofficial)
- Money finishes: 27
- Highest WSOP Main Event finish: 444th, 2017
World Poker Tour
- Title: None
- Final table: 1
- Money finishes: 2
European Poker Tour
- Title: None
- Final table: None
- Money finishes: 6

Christoph Vogelsang (born 26 July 1985) is a German professional poker player from Sassenberg, Münster.

== Early life ==
Vogelsang was raised in Sassenberg, Münster. He studied economics at Witten/Herdecke University and the London School of Economics. Vogelsang currently resides in London and is a Catholic.

== Poker career ==
In 2010, Vogelsang made several $10 deposits into online poker. Within 4 weeks he was playing $5000 No Limit Hold'em online cash games.

In October 2013, Vogelsang cashed in his first major tournament, the EPT London £50,000 Super High Roller where he finished 3rd for £383,200 ($621,321). He participated in the 2014 $1,000,000 Big One for One Drop finishing 3rd for $4,480,001. In June 2017, he won the 2017 Super High Roller Bowl and earned $6,000,000.

As of March 2020, Vogelsang's live tournament earnings exceed $25,000,000.

=== Online poker ===
Vogelsang played under the alias Tight-Man1 on Full Tilt Poker where he earned over $1,900,000 and under the alias 26071985 on PokerStars where he has earned over $600,000.
