= Michael Addamo =

Australian poker player (born 1994)

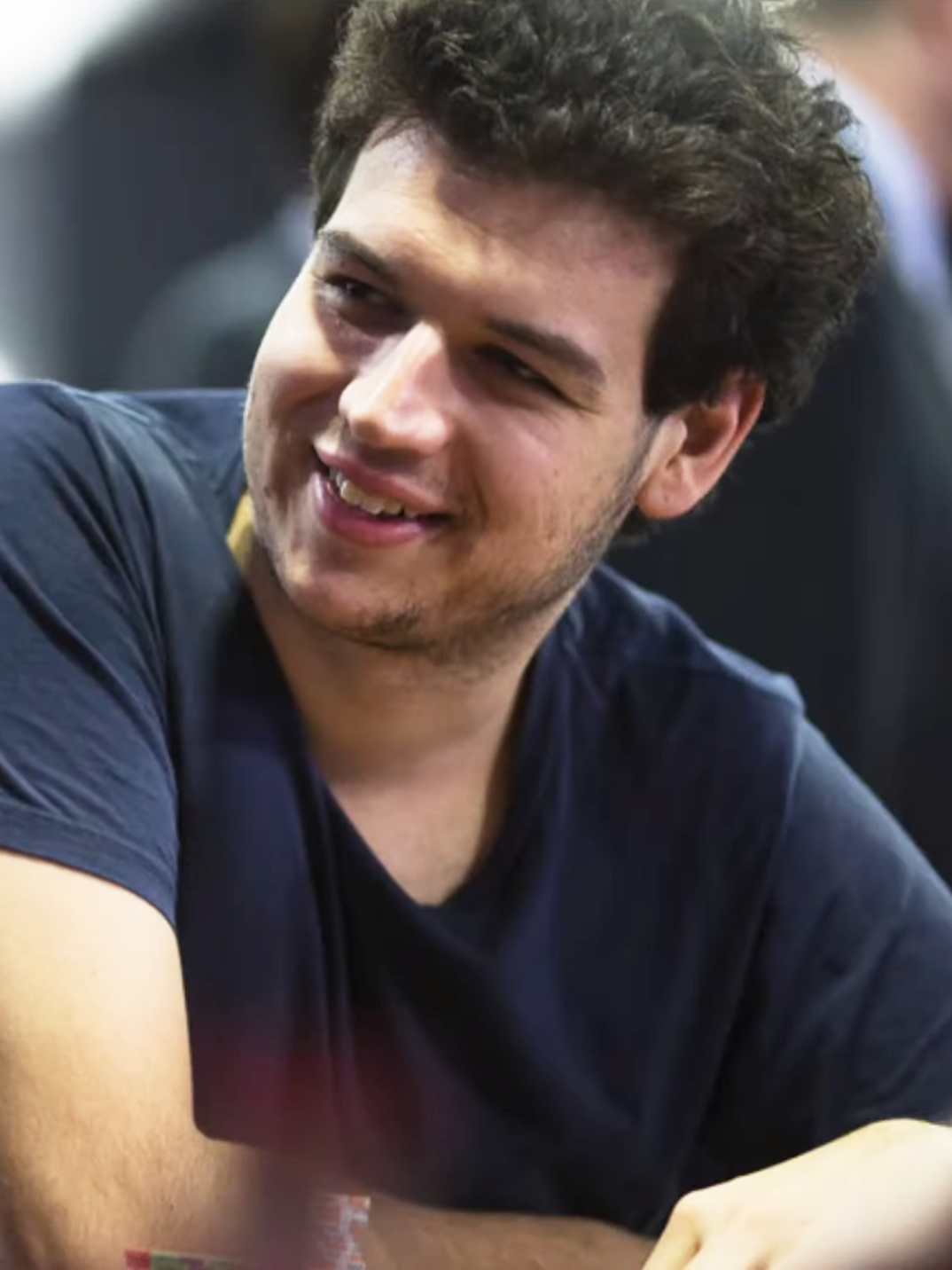
- Addamo in 2017
- Born: 1994 (age 31–32)

World Series of Poker
- Bracelets: 4
- Final tables: 9
- Money finishes: 35
- Highest WSOP Main Event finish: 134th, 2017

European Poker Tour
- Money finish: 1

Michael Addamo (born 1994) is an Australian professional poker player from Melbourne. He is a four-time World Series of Poker (WSOP) bracelet winner.

Addamo was a chess player as a teenager and reached a career-high rating of 1930 in 2013. He studied to be an actuary.

Addamo began playing poker in 2012. His first WSOP cashes came in 2016, including a third-place finish in a $1,500 No Limit Hold'em event. He won his first bracelet at the 2018 WSOP in the $2,620 Marathon No Limit Hold'em event, defeating a field of 1,637 players for $653,000. Later that year, he added another bracelet at the WSOP Europe, winning the €25,500 Super High Roller for €848,000.

Addamo won two more bracelets at the 2021 WSOP. First, he won the $50,000 No Limit Hold'em High Roller for $1,132,968. He then won another bracelet in the $100,000 No Limit Hold'em High Roller on the final day of the series, earning $1,958,569.

Playing under the name imluckbox, Addamo won a World Championship of Online Poker event in 2019. In June 2020, he was runner-up to Justin Bonomo in the Super High Roller Bowl Online for $1,187,500, his largest career cash.

At the 2021 Poker Masters, Addamo won the final two events on consecutive days, including the $100,000 Main Event for $1,160,000, and earned the Purple Jacket as series champion.

As of 2025, Addamo's career live tournament earnings exceed $24,400,000.

== World Series of Poker bracelets ==
Year	Tournament	Prize (US$)
2018	$2,620 Marathon No Limit Hold'em	$653,581
2018 E	€25,500 Super High Roller	€848,702 ($973,360)
2021	$50,000 High Roller No Limit Hold'em 8-Handed	$1,132,968
2021	$100,000 High Roller No Limit Hold'em	$1,958,569
