= Andres Artinano =

Spanish poker player

Andrés Artiñano
- Nickname: Educa-p0ker
- Born: Spain

Andrés Artiñano is a Spanish professional poker player who focuses on online high stakes Texas hold 'em cash games (NLHE). He plays under the alias Educa-p0ker on PokerStars.

== Career ==
Artiñano focuses almost exclusively on online No-Limit Texas hold 'em. He studies game theory optimal gameplay and credits studying poker player Jonas Mols as a key to improving his gameplay. When Artiñano was 18 he went to university for double degrees in law and business. He began moving up in stakes in 2009 and focused on cash games from 2009 to 2019, taking only one year off for tax purposes.

Artiñano was the biggest online winner in the month of January 2016 earning $833,747 of the course of "80 sessions and 18,126 hands".

In 2018, Artiñano joined Doug Polk's online training site Upswing Poker teaching the course, "Elite Cash Game Mastery".

Artiñano has earned over $1,100,000 playing No Limit Hold'em on PokerStars in high stakes online cash games. He rarely plays live tournaments and has only slightly more than $39,000 in live winnings.
