= Fedor Holz =

German poker player (born 1993)

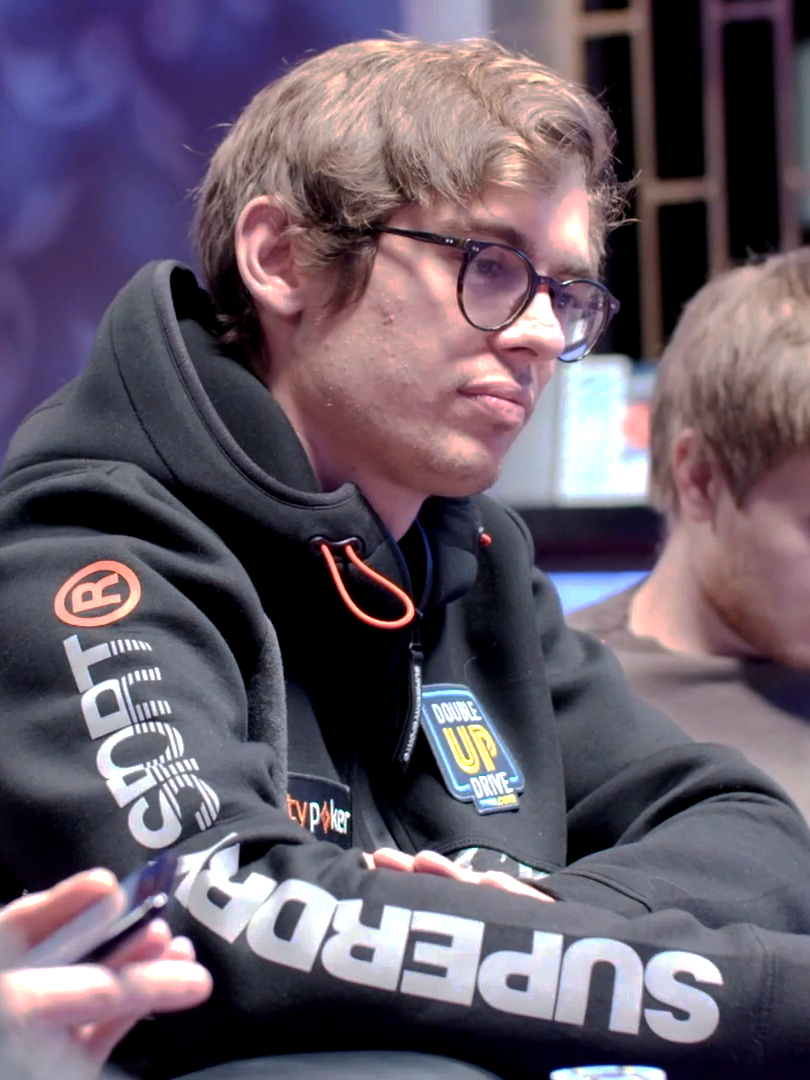
- Holz in 2018
- Nickname: CrownUpGuy
- Born: 25 July 1993 (age 33); Saarbrücken, Germany
- Division: Board Texture Analyzis
World Series of Poker
- Bracelets: 2
- Final tables: 5
- Money finishes: 16
- Highest WSOP Main Event finish: 25th, 2015
World Poker Tour
- Money finishes: 3
European Poker Tour
- Money finishes: 3

Fedor Holz (born 25 July 1993) is a German professional poker player, originally from Saarbrücken, who focuses on high roller tournaments. He was ranked by Pocketfives.com as the best online MTT player in 2014 and 2015. In July 2016, Holz won his first WSOP bracelet, in the $111,111 High Roller For One Drop, winning $4,981,775.

== Poker career ==
Holz had his first live cash in 2012 at the €500 No Limit Hold'em GPT II Deepstack Series Main Event, where he finished second for €15,320. Holz plays online under the alias CrownUpGuy. In September 2014, he won the World Championship of Online Poker for $1.3 million. In 2015, Holz finished 25th in the World Series of Poker Main Event, cashing for $262,574.

In 2016, Fedor won the Triton Super High Roller for $3,463,500 in January, and finished runner up in the Super High Roller Bowl for $3,500,000 later that year. Holz won his first WSOP bracelet in the $111,111 High Roller for One-Drop event and earned $4,981,775 for the victory. Holz's biggest cash was in 2018 at the $1,000,000 No Limit Hold'em - The Big One for One Drop for $6,000,000. In the 2020 WSOP Online, he won his second bracelet in the $25,000 No Limit Hold'em - Heads Up event for $1,077,250. Also in 2020, Holz joined the GGPoker team as a brand ambassador.

As of 2023, Holz is first on the German all-time money list with career live tournament winnings of over $40,200,000.

=== World Series of Poker ===
World Series of Poker bracelets
Year	Event	Prize money
2016	$111,111 High Roller for One-Drop Hold'em	$4,981,775
2020 O	$25,000 Heads Up No Limit Hold'em	$1,077,025

An "O" following a year denotes bracelet(s) won during the World Series of Poker Online

== Personal life ==
Holz was born in Germany and currently resides in Vienna, Austria.
