= Partypoker =

Online poker card room

PartyPoker
- Type: Public
- Industry: Online poker
- Founded: 2001
- Founder: Ruth Parasol, Anurag Dikshit, Vikrant Bhargava
- Headquarters: Isle of Man
- Area served: Worldwide
- Key people: Tom Waters, Head of Poker
- Owner: Entain plc
- Website: www.partypoker.com

PartyPoker is an online poker card room. Launched in 2001 by PartyGaming, the site has had up to 80,000 players logged-in and was the largest online card room until 2006. As of 2017, it remains among the largest online poker card rooms. The site was endorsed by Mike Sexton, the former host of the World Poker Tour television show. The domain partypoker.com attracted at least 3.6 million visitors annually by 2008 according to a Compete.com study. Today, the site is run by Entain and is available in 14 different languages. In addition to the worldwide partypoker.com, partypoker also offers dedicated separate networks for French, Italian, Ontarian, Pennsylvanian, New Jerseyan & Michigander players.

In 2011 PartyGaming merged with bwin to form Bwin.Party Digital Entertainment. In 2016, after a protracted bidding process between 888 Holdings and GVC Holdings, Bwin.Party Digital Entertainment accepted GVC Holdings' bid for £1.1 billion. In December 2020, GVC holdings changed their name to Entain in a global rebrand. Entain considered selling partypoker in March 2024, but changed their mind later that year.

== Cash games ==
The games include Texas Hold 'em (No Limit), Pot Limit Omaha, and Pot Limit Omaha Hi-Lo. The stakes can range from .01/.02 to $100/$200. In 2012 PartyPoker removed its high-stakes cash games with the highest stakes at $10/$20. By 2024, the highest stake cash games regularly offered were $5/$10.

Party Poker formerly offered a bad beat jackpot, as well as 7 Card Stud cash games.

PartyPoker also offers FastForward cash game format. Every player is automatically re-seated to another random table immediately after they fold their hand, or after the hand is over. This format is very popular by players and poker rooms. It is faster and offers a higher level of security as it is a lot more difficult for two or more players to participate in collusion.

== Tournaments ==
The worldwide site offers a variety of scheduled and on-demand tournaments, with participant numbers ranging from 10 to thousands. Single-table sit & go tournaments are offered as well.

PartyPoker formerly hosted the PartyPoker Million. This tournament began with online qualifiers, but the final stages were held at in-person poker tables aboard a cruise ship. The winners of these Party Poker Million events included Kathy Liebert, Howard Lederer, Erick Lindgren, and Michael Gracz.

By 2024, PartyPoker was known for its many satellites, allowing qualifying players to participate in high buy-in tournaments for a fraction of the entry fee. Players could even qualify for the $5,300 PartyPoker Millions Online for as little as $0.01

== History ==
PartyPoker was the largest online card room in the world until 2006 when it left the US market due to the Unlawful Internet Gambling Enforcement Act of 2006. PokerStars then claimed that title for many years, until they were in-turn overtaken by GGPoker in 2021.

In 2014, PartyPoker had plans to return to the US market for real money players. However by March 2017, US players were still not permitted, except for the state of New Jersey. By December 2024, users from Michigan & Pennsylvania could also play on PartyPoker, but only in segregated pools against players from their own state.

In 2015, PartyPoker partnered with Dusk Till Dawn and later hosted "The PartyPoker Grand Prix".

In 2017, the casino hosted the PartyPokerLIVE MILLIONS Dusk Till Dawn festival. The £5,300 ($7,085.84) main event generated a prize pool of £6,017,395 ($8,044,956.25). Maria Lampropulos won the main event earning £1,000,000. The £10,300 ($13,770.59) High Roller event was won by Vojtech Ruzicka, earning him US$363,135.

In May 2021, PartyPoker and PartyCasino entered a new multi-year partnership with McLaren Racing.

In February 2019, PartyPoker relaunched their Team Online, with twitch streamer Matt Staples first to be signed. At its peak, PartyPoker had over two dozen sponsored players across Team Online & Live ambassadors. However, as of December 2024, only the two Staples brothers remain.

This decline was largely due to a significant revenue drop, as PartyPoker pulled its operations from any country without strict gambling regulations, after parent company Entain were fined millions in related court losses.

PartyPoker withdrew their services from numerous countries, leaving only players residing in Belgium, Brazil, Canada, Czech Republic, Denmark, Estonia, Finland, Georgia, Germany, Greece, Latvia, Malta, Mexico, Ireland, Sweden & the UK able to play on worldwide PartyPoker.

In 2025, PartyPoker launched the PartyPoker Tour, a live tournament series focused on low-to-mid-stakes players with a "no extra prize-pool deductions" policy. The inaugural season featured five stops across the UK. For 2026, the tour expanded to nine stops, adding venues in Ireland and Spain alongside continued UK events, with confirmed stops including London, Glasgow, Cork, and Murcia.
