= 2024 World Series of Poker results =

Below are the results for the 2024 World Series of Poker, held from May 28–July 17 at Horseshoe Las Vegas and Paris Las Vegas in Las Vegas, Nevada. There are 99 bracelet events.

== Key ==
*	Elected to the Poker Hall of Fame
(#/#)	This denotes a bracelet winner. The first number is the number of bracelets won in the 2024 WSOP. The second number is the total number of bracelets won. Both numbers represent totals as of that point during the tournament.
Place	What place each player at the final table finished
Name	The player who made it to the final table
Prize (US$)	The amount of money awarded for each finish at the event's final table

== Results ==
=== Event #1: $5,000 Champions Reunion No-Limit Hold'em ===
- 3-Day Event: May 28–30
- Number of Entries: 493
- Total Prize Pool: $2,047,800
- Number of Payouts: 74
- Winning Hand: 10♥ 10♣

Final Table
Place	Name	Prize
1st	(United States) Asher Conniff (1/1)	$408,468
2nd	(Turkey) Halil Tasyurek	$272,305
3rd	(China) Yuzhou Yin	$188,342
4th	(France) Jonathan Pastore (0/1)	$132,545
5th	(United States) Terry Fleischer	$94,936
6th	(United States) David Coleman	$69,231
7th	(Serbia) Nenad Dukic	$51,416
8th	(Costa Rica) Michael Acevedo	$38,903

=== Event #2: $500 Casino Employees No-Limit Hold'em ===
- 2-Day Event: May 28–29
- Number of Entries: 1,189
- Total Prize Pool: $499,380
- Number of Payouts: 179
- Winning Hand: K♣ Q♣

Final Table
Place	Name	Prize
1st	(United States) Jose Garcia (1/1)	$79,134
2nd	(United States) Richard Rothmeier	$52,773
3rd	(United States) Alexander Green	$37,264
4th	(United States) Lang Anderson	$26,698
5th	(United States) Barry Goldberg	$19,412
6th	(United States) Bradley Wolfe	$14,328
7th	(United States) Joshua Sieverding	$10,737
8th	(United States) Christopher Keem	$8,171
9th	(United Kingdom) Lukas Robinson	$6,317

=== Event #3: $500 WSOP Kickoff No-Limit Hold'em Freezeout ===
- 3-Day Event: May 29–31
- Number of Entries: 3,485
- Total Prize Pool: $1,463,700
- Number of Payouts: 523
- Winning Hand: J♥ 9♥

Final Table
Place	Name	Prize
1st	(United Kingdom) Daniel Willis (1/1)	$175,578
2nd	(United States) Michael Wang (0/2)	$117,056
3rd	(United States) Shawn Smith	$86,820
4th	(United States) Steven Borella	$64,920
5th	(Japan) Yoshinori Funayama	$48,938
6th	(United States) Daniel Sherer	$37,194
7th	(United States) John Marino	$28,501
8th	(United States) David Niedringhaus	$22,022
9th	(United States) Aaron Aldy	$17,159

=== Event #4: $1,500 Omaha Hi-Lo 8 or Better ===
- 3-Day Event: May 29–31
- Number of Entries: 928
- Total Prize Pool: $1,238,880
- Number of Payouts: 140
- Winning Hand: K♥ 7♣ 4♠ 3♦

Final Table
Place	Name	Prize
1st	(United States) James Chen (1/1)	$209,350
2nd	(United States) Lewis Brant	$139,563
3rd	(United States) Sovann Pen	$97,445
4th	(United States) Adam Nattress	$69,129
5th	(United States) Pearce Arnold	$49,842
6th	(United States) Aleksey Filatov	$36,531
7th	(United States) Curtis Phelps	$27,227
8th	(United States) Todd Dakake	$20,640

=== Event #5: $1,000 Mystery Millions No-Limit Hold'em ===
- 5-Day Event: May 30–June 4
- Number of Entries: 18,409
- Total Prize Pool: $16,199,920
- Number of Payouts: 2,512
- Winning Hand: K♦ J♥

Final Table
Place	Name	Prize
1st	(Australia) Malcolm Trayner (1/1)	$1,000,000
2nd	(United States) Carson Richards	$536,080
3rd	(United States) Eugene Tito	$407,970
4th	(United States) Junho Song	$312,250
5th	(United States) Oshri Azran	$240,350
6th	(United States) Amir Mirrasouli	$186,080
7th	(United States) Michael Miller	$144,900
8th	(United States) Christopher Castellan	$113,490
9th	(United States) Jake Brown	$89,411

=== Event #6: $25,000 Heads-Up No-Limit Hold'em Championship ===
- 3-Day Event: May 30–June 1
- Number of Entries: 64
- Total Prize Pool: $1,504,000
- Number of Payouts: 8
- Winning Hand: K♦ Q♣

Final Table
Place	Name	Prize
1st	(United Kingdom) Darius Samual (1/1)	$500,000
2nd	(United States) Faraz Jaka (0/1)	$300,000
SF	(United Kingdom) Nikolai Mamut	$180,000
SF	(Russia) Artur Martirosian (0/2)	$180,000
QF	(United States) John Smith	$86,000
QF	(Serbia) Marko Grujic	$86,000
QF	(United Kingdom) Owen Messere	$86,000
QF	(United Kingdom) Patrick Kennedy	$86,000

=== Event #7: $1,500 Dealers Choice ===
- 3-Day Event: May 30–June 1
- Number of Entries: 530
- Total Prize Pool: $707,550
- Number of Payouts: 80
- Winning Hand: J♣ 9♥ 8♠ 7♥ 5♥ (No-Limit 2-7 Single Draw)

Final Table
Place	Name	Prize
1st	(United States) John Hennigan (1/7)	$138,296
2nd	(United Kingdom) Robert Wells	$90,339
3rd	(Hungary) Peter Gelencser (0/1)	$60,343
4th	(Sweden) Viktor Blom	$41,237
5th	(United States) Brayden Gazlay	$28,845
6th	(United States) Clint Wolcyn	$20,665

=== Event #8: $5,000 Pot-Limit Omaha ===
- 3-Day Event: May 31–June 2
- Number of Entries: 733
- Total Prize Pool: $3,371,800
- Number of Payouts: 110
- Winning Hand: A♣ Q♥ 8♣ 6♠

Final Table
Place	Name	Prize
1	(United States) Bryce Yockey (1/2)	$606,654
2	(Colombia) Farid Jattin	$404,430
3	(United States) Zachary Schwartz	$283,221
4	(United States) Aditya Sadhu	$201,419
5	(United States) Jason Berilgen	$145,504
6	(Portugal) Joao Vieira (0/3)	$106,795
7	(Brazil) Joao Simao Peres (0/2)	$79,661
8	(United States) Paul Radcliffe	$60,405

=== Event #9: $1,500 Limit Hold'em ===
- 3-Day Event: May 31–June 2
- Number of Entries: 443
- Total Prize Pool: $591,405
- Number of Payouts: 67
- Winning Hand: Q♥ 8♦

Final Table
Place	Name	Prize
1st	(United States) Nick Guagenti (1/2)	$121,074
2nd	(United States) Joseph Brodsky	$80,717
3rd	(United States) George Chen	$54,708
4th	(Finland) Juha Helppi (0/2)	$37,880
5th	(United States) Qinghai Pan (0/2)	$26,807
6th	(United States) Bradley Carter	$19,400
7th	(United States) Abdulrahim Amer	$14,363
8th	(United States) John Kim	$10,886

=== Event #10: $10,000 Omaha Hi-Lo 8 or Better Championship ===
- 4-Day Event: June 1–4
- Number of Entries: 171
- Total Prize Pool: $1,590,300
- Number of Payouts: 30
- Winning Hand: A♥ 9♦ 8♠ 4♦

Final Table
Place	Name	Prize
1st	(United States) Scott Seiver (1/5)	$426,744
2nd	(Canada) Jonathan Cohen (0/1)	$284,495
3rd	(United States) Calvin Anderson (0/4)	$197,582
4th	(United States) Paul Zappulla	$140,273
5th	(United States) Sami El Dein	$101,853
6th	(United Kingdom) Benny Glaser (0/5)	$75,678
7th	(United States) Jake Schwartz	$57,570
8th	(United States) Jared Bleznick	$44,864

=== Event #11: $1,500 Badugi ===
- 3-Day Event: June 2–4
- Number of Entries: 487
- Total Prize Pool: $650,145
- Number of Payouts: 74
- Winning Hand: Q♣ J♥ 4♠ 2♦

Final Table
Place	Name	Prize
1st	(United States) David Prociak (1/2)	$129,676
2nd	(United States) Matt Grapenthien (0/1)	$84,650
3rd	(Hong Kong) Edward Chun Ho Yam	$56,508
4th	(Norway) Tobias Leknes	$38,597
5th	(Poland) Tomasz Gluszko	$26,988
6th	(United States) Brandon Cantu (0/2)	$19,330

=== Event #12: $1,500 No-Limit Hold'em (6-Handed) ===
- 3-Day Event: June 3–5
- Number of Entries: 2,526
- Total Prize Pool: $3,372,210
- Number of Payouts: 379
- Winning Hand: 8♥ 6♥

Final Table
Place	Name	Prize
1st	(Bulgaria) Simeon Spasov (1/2)	$439,815
2nd	(United States) John Gordon	$293,218
3rd	(South Korea) Steve Yea	$210,645
4th	(United States) Chih Fan	$152,995
5th	(United States) Mark Dube	$112,362
6th	(Spain) Daniel Palau	$83,452

=== Event #13: $10,000 Dealers Choice Championship ===
- 4-Day Event: June 3–6
- Number of Entries: 124
- Total Prize Pool: $1,153,200
- Number of Payouts: 22
- Winning Hand: 9x 5x 4x 3x 2x (Pot-Limit 2-7 Triple Draw)

Final Table
Place	Name	Prize
1st	(United States) Robert Mizrachi (1/5)	$333,045
2nd	(United States) Michael Martinelli	$215,848
3rd	(Japan) Ryutaro Suzuki (0/1)	$144,431
4th	(United States) Ben Lamb (0/2)	$99,885
5th	(United States) David Bach (0/3)	$71,476
6th	(United States) Richard Bai	$52,985

=== Event #14: $1,000 Super Turbo Bounty No-Limit Hold'em Freezeout ===
- 1-Day Event: June 4
- Number of Entries: 2,639
- Total Prize Pool: $2,322,320
- Number of Payouts: 396
- Winning Hand: Q♥ 5♥

Final Table
Place	Name	Prize
1st	(France) Thibault Perissat (1/1)	$197,308
2nd	(Canada) Ron Schindelheim	$131,571
3rd	(Taiwan) Nevan Chang	$96,965
4th	(United States) Jesse Yaginuma (0/2)	$72,115
5th	(United States) Gary Leibovitz	$54,129
6th	(United States) Cole Griffith	$41,007
7th	(Switzerland) Dinesh Alt	$31,358
8th	(Canada) Hrair Yapoudjian	$24,207
9th	(France) Anthony Monin	$18,866

=== Event #15: $1,500 Pot-Limit Omaha Hi-Lo 8 or Better ===
- 3-Day Event: June 4–6
- Number of Entries: 1,277
- Total Prize Pool: $1,704,795
- Number of Payouts: 192
- Winning Hand: A♠ J♠ 9♠ 3♣

Final Table
Place	Name	Prize
1st	(United Kingdom) Caleb Furth (1/1)	$265,361
2nd	(China) Jiyang Gan	$176,891
3rd	(United States) Walter Chambers	$125,665
4th	(Austria) Andreas Fröhli	$90,468
5th	(Canada) Michael Machugh	$66,014
6th	(Canada) Andrew Paterson	$48,833
7th	(United States) Thomas Koral (0/2)	$36,628
8th	(Germany) Mathias Bayer	$27,862

=== Event #16: $5,000 No-Limit Hold'em 8-Handed ===
- 4-Day Event: June 4–7
- Number of Entries: 660
- Total Prize Pool: $3,036,000
- Number of Payouts: 124
- Winning Hand: K♣ J♦

Final Table
Place	Name	Prize
1st	(United States) Brent Hart (1/1)	$660,284
2nd	(United States) Edward Ochana	$440,202
3rd	(United States) Alexander Queen	$309,128
4th	(India) Kartik Ved (0/1)	$220,373
5th	(United States) Shant Marashlian	$159,517
6th	(United States) Daniyal Gheba	$117,271
7th	(United States) Taylor Black	$87,582
8th	(Bulgaria) Krasimir Yankov	$66,464

=== Event #17: $800 No-Limit Hold'em Deepstack ===
- 2-Day Event: June 5–6
- Number of Entries: 4,732
- Total Prize Pool: 3,331,328
- Number of Payouts: 710
- Winning Hand: A♣ J♥

Final Table
Place	Name	Prize
1st	(United States) Timothy Murphy (1/1)	$368,977
2nd	(United States) Raymond Mancini	$246,031
3rd	(United States) Tao Chu	$183,237
4th	(United States) Vernon Barruga	$137,551
5th	(United States) Hai Nguyen	$104,079
6th	(United States) Dimitre Dimitrov	$79,385
7th	(United States) Yuvaraj Rai	$61,042
8th	(United States) Michael Wills	$47,320
9th	(United Kingdom) Harry Lodge (0/1)	$36,986

=== Event #18: $1,500 Pot-Limit Omaha ===
- 3-Day Event: June 5–7
- Number of Entries: 1,469
- Total Prize Pool: $1,961,115
- Number of Payouts: 221
- Winning Hand: A♥ K♠ Q♠ 10♥

Final Table
Place	Name	Prize
1st	(United States) Dylan Weisman (1/2)	$294,311
2nd	(United States) Chino Rheem	$196,191
3rd	(United States) Steve Zolotow (0/2)	$140,077
4th	(Germany) Grzegorz Derkowski	$101,284
5th	(United States) John Zable	$74,178
6th	(United States) Jhojan Rivera	$55,034
7th	(United States) Abdul Al-Magableh	$41,371
8th	(United States) Leslie Roussell	$31,516

=== Event #19: $10,000 Limit Hold'em Championship ===
- 3-Day Event: June 5–7
- Number of Entries: 104
- Total Prize Pool: $967,200
- Number of Payouts: 20
- Winning Hand: 10♥ 2♠

Final Table
Place	Name	Prize
1st	(United States) John Racener (1/2)	$308,930
2nd	(United States) Chad Eveslage (0/3)	$205,954
3rd	(United States) Marco Johnson (0/2)	$142,245
4th	(United States) Anthony Marsico	$101,062
5th	(United States) Shyamsundar Challa	$73,922
6th	(United States) Justin Kusumowidagdo	$55,715
7th	(United States) Ronnie Bardah (0/1)	$43,311
8th	(United States) Andrew Kelsall (0/1)	$34,759

=== Event #20: $300 Gladiators of Poker No-Limit Hold'em ===
- 6-Day Event: June 6–11
- Number of Entries: 20,647
- Total Prize Pool: $5,079,162
- Number of Payouts: 757
- Winning Hand: K♥ 9♥

Final Table
Place	Name	Prize
1st	(United States) Stephen Winters (1/1)	$401,210
2nd	(United States) Simon Britton	$253,300
3rd	(United States) Quang Vu	$192,030
4th	(United States) Brendon Herrick	$146,450
5th	(United States) James Morgan	$112,350
6th	(United States) Sung Pil Kim	$86,710
7th	(United States) Steve Foutty	$67,320
8th	(United States) Jordan Johnson	$52,590
9th	(United States) Caleb Levesque	$41,337

=== Event #21: $25,000 High Roller No-Limit Hold'em 6-Handed ===
- 3-Day Event: June 6–8
- Number of Entries: 216
- Total Prize Pool: $5,076,000
- Number of Payouts: 41
- Winning Hand: A♥ Q♦

Final Table
Place	Name	Prize
1st	(United States) Brek Schutten (1/1)	$1,405,641
2nd	(United States) Tyler Stafman	$938,775
3rd	(United States) Michael Rocco	$639,620
4th	(United States) Taylor von Kriegenbergh	$444,766
5th	(United States) Brandon Wilson	$315,771
6th	(Japan) Masashi Oya (0/1)	$229,002

=== Event #22: $1,500 Limit 2-7 Lowball Triple Draw ===
- 3-Day Event: June 6–8
- Number of Entries: 574
- Total Prize Pool: $766,290
- Number of Payouts: 87
- Winning Hand: 8♥ 5♠ 4♥ 3♣ 2♥

Final Table
Place	Name	Prize
1st	(United States) Aaron Cummings (1/1)	$146,516
2nd	(Japan) Yuichi Kanai	$95,981
3rd	(United States) Alexander Wilkinson	$64,256
4th	(United States) Heather Alcorn	$43,984
5th	(South Korea) Sean Yu (0/1)	$30,800
6th	(United States) Tony Lazar	$22,075

=== Event #23: $1,500 Shootout No-Limit Hold'em ===
- 3-Day Event: June 7–9
- Number of Entries:
- Total Prize Pool:
- Number of Payouts:
- Winning Hand: Q♠ 10♠

Final Table
Place	Name	Prize
1st	(United States) Daniel Sepiol (1/1)	$305,849
2nd	(Philippines) Robert Natividad	$203,889
3rd	(United States) James Davidson	$148,196
4th	(United States) Jeremy Ausmus (0/6)	$109,071
5th	(United States) Daniel Strelitz (0/2)	$81,298
6th	(United States) Richard Dixon	$61,380
7th	(Australia) Sean Ragozzini	$46,948
8th	(United States) Scott Ball (0/2)	$36,385
9th	(United States) Aaron Pinson	$28,577

=== Event #24: $10,000 Pot-Limit Omaha Hi-Lo 8 or Better Championship ===
- 3-Day Event: June 7–9
- Number of Entries: 259
- Total Prize Pool: $2,408,700
- Number of Payouts: 39
- Winning Hand: K♠ K♣ Q♦ 3♦

Final Table
Place	Name	Prize
1st	(United States) Sean Troha (1/3)	$536,713
2nd	(United States) Tyler Brown (0/1)	$357,807
3rd	(Brazil) Joao Simao (0/2)	$247,874
4th	(Brazil) Yuri Dzivielevski (0/4)	$175,321
5th	(United States) Robert Tanita	$126,662
6th	(United States) Philip Shing	$93,512
7th	(United States) Bradley Ruben (0/4)	$70,585
8th	(Mexico) Luis Velador (0/2)	$54,499
9th	(United States) Joshua Thibodaux	$43,065

=== Event #25: $3,000 Limit Hold'em 6-Handed ===
- 3-Day Event: June 8–10
- Number of Entries: 248
- Total Prize Pool: $662,160
- Number of Payouts: 38
- Winning Hand: 7♥ 4♦

Final Table
Place	Name	Prize
1st	(United States) Daniel Vampan (1/1)	$148,635
2nd	(United States) Robert Wells	$99,578
3rd	(United States) Nicholas Caltabiano	$67,919
4th	(United States) Lucas Wagner	$47,179
5th	(Georgia (country)) Roland Israelashvili	$33,387
6th	(United States) Frank Yakubson	$24,078

=== Event #26: $25,000 High Roller No-Limit Hold'em ===
- 3-Day Event: June 9–11
- Number of Entries: 318
- Total Prize Pool: $7,473,000
- Number of Payouts: 48
- Winning Hand: 10♦ 4♣

Final Table
Place	Name	Prize
1st	(United States) Nick Schulman (1/5)	$1,667,842
2nd	(United States) Noel Rodriguez	$1,111,897
3rd	(United Kingdom) Dean Lyall	$760,083
4th	(United States) David Stamm	$529,833
5th	(United Kingdom) Ben Heath (0/1)	$376,762
6th	(Spain) Roberto Perez	$273,414
7th	(China) Yingui Li	$202,574
8th	(United States) Shaun Deeb (0/6)	$153,302

=== Event #27: $1,500 Big O ===
- 3-Day Event: June 9–11
- Number of Entries: 1555
- Total Prize Pool: $2,075,925
- Number of Payouts: 234
- Winning Hand: 9♠ 9♥ 5♠ 4♥ 2♠

Final Table
Place	Name	Prize
1st	(United States) Michael Christ (1/1)	$306,884
2nd	(United States) Matthew Beinner	$204,601
3rd	(United States) Dylan Lindsey	$146,595
4th	(United States) Eduardo Lezcano	$106,315
5th	(United States) Matthew Bretzfield	$78,056
6th	(Serbia) Damjan Radanov	$58,025
7th	(Japan) Tomoki Matsuda	$43,681
8th	(United States) John Bunch	$33,035

=== Event #28: $1,500 Freezeout No-Limit Hold'em ===
- 3-Day Event: June 10–12
- Number of Entries: 2,317
- Total Prize Pool: $3,095,865
- Number of Payouts: 348
- Winning Hand: J♠ 8♥

Final Table
Place	Name	Prize
1st	(United States) Evan Benton (1/1)	$412,484
2nd	(United States) Balakrishna Patur	$274,972
3rd	(Spain) Andres Gonzalez	$201,518
4th	(China) Haiyang Yang	$149,145
5th	(United States) Mukul Pahuja	$111,485
6th	(China) Guofeng Wang	$84,175
7th	(United States) Nick Maimone	$64,202
8th	(Romania) George Tomescu	$49,472
9th	(France) Nicolas Vayssieres	$38,517

=== Event #29: $10,000 Limit 2-7 Triple Draw Championship ===
- 4-Day Event: June 10–13
- Number of Entries: 149
- Total Prize Pool: $1,385,700
- Number of Payouts: 23
- Winning Hand: 7♣ 5♥ 4♥ 3♣ 2♥

Final Table
Place	Name	Prize
1st	(United States) Phil Ivey (1/11)	$347,440
2nd	(United States) Danny Wong (0/1)	$225,827
3rd	(United States) Jason Mercier (0/6)	$151,412
4th	(United Kingdom) Benny Glaser (0/5)	$104,825
5th	(Canada) Jonathan Cohen (0/1)	$75,015
6th	(United Kingdom) Philip Sternheimer	$55,553

=== Event #30: $600 Mixed No-Limit Hold'em/Pot-Limit Omaha Deepstack ===
- 2-Day Event: June 11–12
- Number of Entries: 3,351
- Total Prize Pool: $1,709,010
- Number of Payouts: 503
- Winning Hand: K♠ Q♠ 3♠ 3♦ (Pot-Limit Omaha)

Final Table
Place	Name	Prize
1st	(Canada) Alen Bakovic (1/1)	$207,064
2nd	(United States) Brian Etheridge	$138,051
3rd	(Latvia) Olegs Buiko	$101,682
4th	(Italy) Sergio Benso	$75,518
5th	(United States) Quan Tran	$56,557
6th	(United States) Marcus Ruiz	$42,715
7th	(United States) Joseph Couden (0/1)	$32,537
8th	(United States) Daniel Goldberg	$24,997
9th	(China) Jianqiang Yu	$19,371

=== Event #31: $3,000 No-Limit Hold'em 6-Handed ===
- 3-Day Event: June 11–13
- Number of Entries: 1,230
- Total Prize Pool: $3,284,100
- Number of Payouts: 185
- Winning Hand: J♠ 10♠

Final Table
Place	Name	Prize
1st	(United States) Nicholas Seward (1/1)	$516,135
2nd	(Ukraine) Konstantyn Holskyi	$344,092
3rd	(Japan) Akinobu Maeda	$238,886
4th	(United States) David Coleman	$168,448
5th	(Greece) Nikolaos Konstas	$120,672
6th	(United States) Stephen Buell	$87,846

=== Event #32: $1,500 Seven Card Stud ===
- 3-Day Event: June 11–13
- Number of Entries: 406
- Total Prize Pool: $542,010
- Number of Payouts: 61
- Winning Hand: A♠ 10♣ / A♣ 10♥ 4♣ / K♠

Final Table
Place	Name	Prize
1st	(United Kingdom) Richard Ashby (1/2)	$113,725
2nd	(United Kingdom) Adam Owen	$75,805
3rd	(United States) Michael Noori (0/1)	$51,626
4th	(China) Mengqi Chen	$35,880
5th	(United States) Brandon Shack-Harris (0/2)	$25,458
6th	(United States) Jaycin Cross	$18,450
7th	(United States) Aaron Kupin	$13,662
8th	(United States) Hal Rotholz	$10,343
9th	(United States) Christopher Tryba (0/1)	$8,009

=== Event #33: $600 Pot-Limit Omaha Deepstack ===
- 2-Day Event: June 12–13
- Number of Entries: 2,402
- Total Prize Pool: $1,225,020
- Number of Payouts: 361
- Winning Hand: A♥ 9♣ 8♠ 3♥

Final Table
Place	Name	Prize
1st	(Chile) Alex Manzano (1/1)	$161,846
2nd	(United States) Robert Gill	$107,874
3rd	(United States) Kelly Kim	$78,018
4th	(United States) Damon Sita	$57,034
5th	(United States) Oziel Velador	$42,149
6th	(United Kingdom) Mitchell Hynam	$31,492
7th	(United States) Nicholas Gonzalez	$23,792
8th	(Ukraine) Ruslan Nazarenko	$18,177

=== Event #34: $2,500 No-Limit Hold'em Freezeout ===
- 3-Day Event: June 12–14
- Number of Entries: 1,267
- Total Prize Pool: $2,819,075
- Number of Payouts: 191
- Winning Hand: Q♠ 9♠

Final Table
Place	Name	Prize
1st	(Spain) Antonio Galiana (1/1)	$439,395
2nd	(France) Johan Guilbert	$292,927
3rd	(United States) Jeremy Ausmus (0/6)	$202,358
4th	(Finland) Juha Helppi (0/2)	$151,592
5th	(France) Romain Lewis (0/1)	$111,222
6th	(United States) Joshua Reichard	$82,702
7th	(United Kingdom) Patrick Leonard (0/1)	$62,334
8th	(United States) David Goodman (0/1)	$47,632
9th	(Republic of Ireland) Eoghan O'Dea (0/1)	$36,908

=== Event #35: $1,500 H.O.R.S.E. ===
- 3-Day Event: June 12–14
- Number of Entries: 835
- Total Prize Pool: $1,114,725
- Number of Payouts: 126
- Winning Hand: 9♣ 9♠ / Q♥ J♥ A♥ / Q♦ (Seven Card Stud Hi-Lo 8 or Better)

Final Table
Place	Name	Prize
1st	(United States) Phil Hui (1/4)	$193,545
2nd	(Australia) Daniel Mayoh	$129,052
3rd	(United States) David Avina	$89,485
4th	(United States) Christian Gonzalez	$63,114
5th	(United States) Kevin Cote	$45,291
6th	(China) Xixiang Luo	$33,078
7th	(United States) Daniel Strelitz (0/2)	$24,595
8th	(United States) Bryan Jolly	$18,625
9th	(United States) Thanhlong Nguyen	$14,368

=== Event #36: $800 No-Limit Hold'em Deepstack ===
- 3-Day Event: June 13–15
- Number of Entries: 4,278
- Total Prize Pool: $3,011,712
- Number of Payouts: 642
- Winning Hand: J♣ 6♦

Final Table
Place	Name	Prize
1st	(Israel) Timur Margolin (1/3)	$342,551
2nd	(Azerbaijan) Agharazi Babayev	$228,321
3rd	(United States) Michael Allen	$168,276
4th	(United States) Adam Hendrix	$125,074
5th	(United States) Joseph Couden (0/1)	$93,758
6th	(Mexico) Francisco Rios Vallejo	$70,890
7th	(United States) Cole Uvila	$54,066
8th	(United States) Vaughan Machado	$41,597
9th	(Taiwan) Jeremy Chen	$32,288

=== Event #37: $10,000 Big O Championship ===
- 3-Day Event: June 13–15
- Number of Entries: 332
- Total Prize Pool: $3,087,600
- Number of Payouts: 50
- Winning Hand: K♥ K♦ Q♠ J♥ 4♣

Final Table
Place	Name	Prize
1st	(United States) John Fauver (1/1)	$681,998
2nd	(United States) Calvin Anderson (0/4)	$454,668
3rd	(United States) Nitesh Rawtani	$311,737
4th	(Colombia) Farid Jattin	$217,783
5th	(United States) Dylan Weisman (1/2)	$155,065
6th	(United States) Alfred Atamian	$112,573
7th	(United States) Michael Rocco	$83,359
8th	(United States) Danny Wong (0/1)	$62,985

=== Event #38: $1,500 Monster Stack No-Limit Hold'em ===
- 5-Day Event: June 14–20
- Number of Entries: 8,703
- Total Prize Pool: $11,618,505
- Number of Payouts: 1,306
- Winning Hand: A♦ K♦

Final Table
Place	Name	Prize
1st	(Portugal) Pedro Neves (1/1)	$1,098,220
2nd	(United States) Aaron Johnson	$732,329
3rd	(United States) Jeremy Maher	$550,920
4th	(Portugal) Jose Andrade	$417,213
5th	(United States) Guangming Li	$318,077
6th	(United States) Brian Roff	$244,137
7th	(United States) Timothy Reilly	$188,660
8th	(United States) Bret Martin	$146,789
9th	(France) Robin Guillaumot	$114,998

=== Event #39: $50,000 High Roller No-Limit Hold'em ===
- 3-Day Event: June 14–16
- Number of Entries: 177
- Total Prize Pool: $8,451,750
- Number of Payouts: 27
- Winning Hand: 9♠ 6♠

Final Table
Place	Name	Prize
1st	(Spain) Sergio Aido (1/1)	$2,026,506
2nd	(United States) Chance Kornuth (0/3)	$1,351,000
3rd	(Sweden) Viktor Blom	$951,727
4th	(Spain) Adrián Mateos (0/4)	$681,554
5th	(United States) Jesse Lonis (0/2)	$496,293
6th	(United States) Jonathan Jaffe	$367,577
7th	(Netherlands) Johannes Straver	$276,987
8th	(United States) Bruce Buffer	$212,423

=== Event #40: $1,500 Razz ===
- 3-Day Event: June 14–16
- Number of Entries: 547
- Total Prize Pool: $730,245
- Number of Payouts: 83
- Winning Hand: 6♦ 4♠ / 10♣ Jx 7♣ / Kx

Final Table
Place	Name	Prize
1st	(United States) Scott Seiver (2/6)	$141,374
2nd	(United States) Brandon Shack-Harris (0/2)	$94,247
3rd	(Germany) Ingo Klasen	$64,588
4th	(United States) Maxx Coleman (0/2)	$45,117
5th	(United Kingdom) Sonny Osman	$32,136
6th	(Japan) Akihiro Kawaguchi	$23,349
7th	(United States) Brad Lindsey	$17,313
8th	(United States) Ben Yu (0/4)	$13,105
9th	(France) Steven Abitbol	$10,132

=== Event #41: $1,500 Mixed No-Limit Hold'em/Pot-Limit Omaha Double Board Bomb Pot ===
- 3-Day Event: June 15–17
- Number of Entries: 1,312
- Total Prize Pool: $1,751,520
- Number of Payouts: 197
- Winning Hand: J♠ 10♥ 9♣ 8♥ (Pot-Limit Omaha)

Final Table
Place	Name	Prize
1st	(China) Xixiang Luo (1/1)	$270,820
2nd	(Australia) Daniel Hachem	$180,541
3rd	(United States) William Kopp (0/1)	$127,925
4th	(United States) David Funkhouser	$91,891
5th	(China) Quan Zhou	$66,930
6th	(Brazil) Marcos Exterkotter	$49,439
7th	(Israel) Gabi Livshitz (0/1)	$37,044
8th	(United States) Robert Cote	$28,161
9th	(United States) Scott Dulaney (0/1)	$21,725

=== Event #42: $10,000 Seven Card Stud Championship ===
- 3-Day Event: June 15–17
- Number of Entries: 107
- Total Prize Pool: $995,100
- Number of Payouts: 17
- Winning Hand: J♠ 4♥ / 4♠ Q♠ 5♦ / 10♠

Final Table
Place	Name	Prize
1st	(Australia) James Obst (1/2)	$260,658
2nd	(United States) Paul Volpe (0/3)	$173,391
3rd	(United States) Jason Daly (0/1)	$118,809
4th	(United States) Mike Lang	$83,932
5th	(United States) Robert Mizrachi (1/5)	$61,190
6th	(Finland) Juha Helppi (0/2)	$46,084
7th	(Brazil) André Akkari (0/1)	$35,893
8th	(Brazil) Yuri Dzivielevski (0/4)	$28,945

=== Event #43: $1,500 Mixed: PLO Hi-Lo 8; Omaha Hi-Lo 8; Big O ===
- 4-Day Event: June 16–19
- Number of Entries: 853
- Total Prize Pool: $1,140,090
- Number of Payouts: 129
- Winning Hand: A♣ K♠ 10♦ 9♦ 9♠ (Big O)

Final Table
Place	Name	Prize
1st	(Sweden) Magnus Edengren (1/1)	$196,970
2nd	(United States) Tim Seidensticker	$131,308
3rd	(United States) James Juvancic	$91,132
4th	(United States) Phil Hellmuth (0/17)	$64,324
5th	(United States) Joshua Adcock	$46,187
6th	(United States) Dylan Lambe	$33,748
7th	(China) Fei Chu	$25,100
8th	(United States) Stephen Hubbard	$19,009

=== Event #44: $2,000 No-Limit Hold'em ===
- 3-Day Event: June 17–19
- Number of Entries: 1,561
- Total Prize Pool: $2,778,580
- Number of Payouts: 235
- Winning Hand: A♥ Q♦

Final Table
Place	Name	Prize
1st	(United States) Jared Kingery (1/1)	$410,359
2nd	(United States) Javier Gomez	$273,581
3rd	(United States) Yunkyu Song	$197,443
4th	(Spain) Juan Vecino	$144,176
5th	(Spain) Javier Zarco	$106,537
6th	(India) Yasheel Doddanavar	$79,676
7th	(India) Kavin Shah	$60,317
8th	(Romania) Narcis Nedelcu	$46,227
9th	(United States) Jonathan Glendinning	$35,873

=== Event #45: $10,000 H.O.R.S.E. Championship ===
- 5-Day Event: June 17–21
- Number of Entries: 181
- Total Prize Pool: $1,683,300
- Number of Payouts: 28
- Winning Hand: A♥ K♠ / A♣ 6♠ 5♣ / 5♦ (Seven Card Stud)

Final Table
Place	Name	Prize
1st	(Russia) Maksim Pisarenko (1/1)	$399,988
2nd	(Canada) Mike Leah (0/1)	$266,658
3rd	(United States) Lawrence Brandt (0/2)	$183,049
4th	(United States) Steve Zolotow (0/2)	$128,863
5th	(United Kingdom) Benny Glaser (0/5)	$93,094
6th	(United States) Maria Ho	$69,063
7th	(United Kingdom) Robert Wells	$52,651
8th	(United States) Patrick Moulder	$41,281
9th	(United States) Greg Mascio	$33,313

=== Event #46: $1,000 Seniors No-Limit Hold'em Championship ===
- 4-Day Event: June 18–22
- Number of Entries: 7,954
- Total Prize Pool: $6,999,520
- Number of Payouts: 1,194
- Winning Hand: J♦ 9♠

Final Table
Place	Name	Prize
1st	(United States) Khang Pham (1/1)	$677,326
2nd	(United States) Marc Wolpert	$451,585
3rd	(Canada) Renmei Liu	$339,366
4th	(United Kingdom) Mark Bramley	$256,754
5th	(United States) Luke Graham	$195,573
6th	(Canada) Ray Devita	$149,989
7th	(United States) Randy Levin	$115,823
8th	(United States) Shawn Stuart	$90,060
9th	(United States) William Byrnes	$70,516

=== Event #47: $100,000 High Roller No-Limit Hold'em ===
- 3-Day Event: June 18–20
- Number of Entries: 112
- Total Prize Pool: $10,836,000
- Number of Payouts: 17
- Winning Hand: 9♦ 7♦

Final Table
Place	Name	Prize
1st	(United States) Chris Hunichen (1/1)	$2,838,389
2nd	(United States) Jeremy Ausmus (0/6)	$1,892,260
3rd	(Sweden) Viktor Blom	$1,311,091
4th	(United States) Chance Kornuth (0/3)	$932,725
5th	(Latvia) Aleksejs Ponakovs (0/2)	$681,796
6th	(United States) Justin Saliba (0/2)	$512,465
7th	(United States) Daniel Aharoni	$396,396
8th	(United States) Isaac Haxton (0/1)	$315,805

=== Event #48: $1,000 Pot-Limit Omaha ===
- 3-Day Event: June 18–20
- Number of Entries: 2,212
- Total Prize Pool: $1,946,560
- Number of Payouts: 332
- Winning Hand: K♥ 10♥ 7♣ 4♣

Final Table
Place	Name	Prize
1st	(United States) Christopher Vitch (1/3)	$262,734
2nd	(Canada) Thomas Taylor	$175,179
3rd	(United States) David Prociak (1/2)	$126,853
4th	(United States) Joe Firova	$92,850
5th	(United Kingdom) Jay Harwood	$68,702
6th	(Greece) Ioannis Angelou Konstas	$51,396
7th	(United States) Kharlin Sued	$38,877
8th	(Germany) Christopher Frank (0/1)	$29,740

=== Event #49: $3,000 No-Limit Hold'em Freezeout ===
- 3-Day Event: June 19–21
- Number of Entries: 1,252
- Total Prize Pool: $3,342,840
- Number of Payouts: 188
- Winning Hand: A♦ Q♠

Final Table
Place	Name	Prize
1st	(Norway) Erlend Melsom (1/1)	$523,195
2nd	(Bulgaria) Nikolay Yosifov	$348,784
3rd	(United States) Ben Hoy	$249,005
4th	(United States) Jonathan Schwartz	$180,127
5th	(United States) David Stamm	$132,053
6th	(United States) Maxx Coleman (0/2)	$98,128
7th	(United States) Levi Carden	$73,925
8th	(Israel) Uri Reichenstein	$56,472
9th	(United States) Morgan Petro	$43,751

=== Event #50: $10,000 Razz Championship ===
- 3-Day Event: June 19–21
- Number of Entries: 119
- Total Prize Pool: $1,106,700
- Number of Payouts: 18
- Winning Hand: Q♦ 6x / A♦ 7♥ 6x / 9♠

Final Table
Place	Name	Prize
1st	(United States) George Alexander (1/1)	$282,443
2nd	(Poland) Dzmitry Urbanovich	$188,296
3rd	(China) Ren Lin	$130,447
4th	(United States) Hal Rotholz	$92,774
5th	(United States) Brandon Shack-Harris (0/2)	$67,783
6th	(United States) John Racener (1/2)	$50,915
7th	(United States) Jared Bleznick	$39,350
8th	(Russia) Denis Strebkov (0/2)	$31,317

=== Event #51: $1,500 Super Turbo Bounty No-Limit Hold'em Freezeout ===
- 1-Day Event: June 20
- Number of Entries: 2,110
- Total Prize Pool: $2,816,850
- Number of Payouts: 315
- Winning Hand: A♠ 3♣

Final Table
Place	Name	Prize
1st	(United States) Peter Park (1/1)	$240,724
2nd	(United States) Mark Dube	$160,474
3rd	(Spain) Adria Diaz	$117,451
4th	(United States) Qing Liu	$86,821
5th	(China) Jungyang Lin	$64,828
6th	(United States) Jose Rodriguez	$48,899
7th	(Canada) Zhigang Yang	$37,264
8th	(United States) Julio Novo	$28,693
9th	(United States) Joe Kuether	$22,326

=== Event #52: $5,000 No-Limit Hold'em 6-Handed ===
- 4-Day Event: June 20–23
- Number of Entries: 817
- Total Prize Pool: $3,758,200
- Number of Payouts: 123
- Winning Hand: A♦ 9♦

Final Table
Place	Name	Prize
1st	(Australia) Mostafa Haidary (1/1)	$656,747
2nd	(Germany) Bernd Gleissner (0/1)	$437,821
3rd	(Bulgaria) Krasimir Yankov	$300,293
4th	(United States) Brandon Schwartz	$206,606
5th	(Brazil) Pedro Madeira	$148,939
6th	(United States) Matthew McEwan	$107,770

=== Event #53: $3,000 Nine Game Mix ===
- 3-Day Event: June 20–22
- Number of Entries: 379
- Total Prize Pool: $1,011,930
- Number of Payouts: 57
- Winning Hand: 6♦ 3♣ / 3♠ 6♥ 9♠ / 5♣ (Seven Card Stud)

Final Table
Place	Name	Prize
1st	(Brazil) Yuri Dzivielevski (1/5)	$215,982
2nd	(United States) Nicholas Julia (0/1)	$142,182
3rd	(Japan) Masafumi Iijima	$95,587
4th	(United States) Scott Bohlman (0/1)	$65,654
5th	(Poland) Tomasz Gluszko	$46,094
6th	(Australia) Ashish Gupta	$33,095
7th	(United States) Bradley Jansen (0/1)	$24,312

=== Event #54: $1,500 Millionaire Maker No-Limit Hold'em ===
- 5-Day Event: June 21–25
- Number of Entries: 10,939
- Total Prize Pool: $14,603,565
- Number of Payouts: 1,641
- Winning Hand: A♣ 10♠

Final Table
Place	Name	Prize
1st	(Argentina) Franco Spitale (1/1)	$1,250,125
2nd	(United States) Justin Carey	$1,001,169
3rd	(Canada) Stephen Dauphinais	$651,039
4th	(United States) Paul Saso	$500,109
5th	(United States) Harvey Jackson	$376,469
6th	(United States) Charles Kersey	$289,630
7th	(United States) Jason Hickey	$224,270
8th	(United States) Alex Kim	$174,800
9th	(United States) Owen Savir	$137,150

=== Event #55: $250,000 Super High Roller No-Limit Hold'em ===
- 3-Day Event: June 21–23
- Number of Entries: 75
- Total Prize Pool: $18,675,000
- Number of Payouts: 12
- Winning Hand: 10♥ 7♣

Final Table
Place	Name	Prize
1st	(India) Santhosh Suvarna (1/2)	$5,415,152
2nd	(United States) Ben Tollerene	$3,537,135
3rd	(United States) Chris Hunichen (1/1)	$2,397,312
4th	(Austria) Matthias Eibinger	$1,688,278
5th	(United States) Charles Hook	$1,237,296
6th	(United States) Taylor von Kriegenbergh	$945,219
7th	(United States) Jeremy Ausmus (0/6)	$754,052
8th	(Belarus) Mikita Badziakouski (0/1)	$629,407

=== Event #56: $2,500 Mixed Triple Draw Lowball ===
- 3-Day Event: June 21–23
- Number of Entries: 371
- Total Prize Pool: $825,475
- Number of Payouts: 56
- Winning Hand: 6♦ 5♦ 4♦ 2♠ A♦ (Ace to 5 Lowball Triple Draw)

Final Table
Place	Name	Prize
1st	(United States) Patrick Moulder (1/1)	$177,045
2nd	(Canada) Ian Chan	$115,073
3rd	(United States) Yuebin Guo	$76,547
4th	(United States) Chad Eveslage (0/3)	$52,140
5th	(United States) Matthew Smith	$36,387
6th	(United States) Shaun Deeb (0/6)	$26,033
7th	(United States) Anthony Hu	$19,106

=== Event #57: $10,000 Super Turbo Bounty No-Limit Hold'em Freezeout ===
- 2-Day Event: June 22–23
- Number of Entries: 486
- Total Prize Pool: $4,519,800
- Number of Payouts: 73
- Winning Hand: J♦ 6♦

Final Table
Place	Name	Prize
1st	(United States) Frank Funaro (1/2)	$612,997
2nd	(Japan) Shota Nakanishi (0/1)	$408,658
3rd	(United States) Michael Rocco	$282,983
4th	(Germany) Oliver Weis	$199,342
5th	(Belarus) Aliaksei Boika	$142,892
6th	(United States) Stephen Buell	$104,261
7th	(France) Antoine Saout	$77,460
8th	(United Kingdom) Ludovic Geilich	$58,616

=== Event #58: $50,000 Poker Players Championship ===
- 5-Day Event: June 23–27
- Number of Entries: 89
- Total Prize Pool: $4,249,750
- Number of Payouts: 14
- Winning Hand: A♦ Q♠ J♣ 7♠ (Pot-Limit Omaha)

Final Table
Place	Name	Prize
1st	(Canada) Daniel Negreanu (1/7)	$1,178,703
2nd	(United States) Bryce Yockey (1/2)	$768,467
3rd	(United States) Chris Brewer (0/2)	$519,158
4th	(Canada) Dylan Smith	$363,914
5th	(France) David Benyamine (0/1)	$265,054
6th	(United States) Jeremy Ausmus (0/6)	$200,896
7th	(United States) Phil Ivey (1/11)	$158,719

=== Event #59: $1,000 Super Seniors No-Limit Hold'em ===
- 4-Day Event: June 24–27
- Number of Entries: 3,362
- Total Prize Pool: $2,958,560
- Number of Payouts: 505
- Winning Hand: A♥ 10♥

Final Table
Place	Name	Prize
1st	(United States) Sean Jazayeri (1/1)	$358,025
2nd	(Turkey) Yucel Eminoglu	$238,748
3rd	(United States) Paul Runge	$178,250
4th	(United States) Manelic Minaya	$134,075
5th	(United Kingdom) Gary Fisher	$101,606
6th	(Chile) Felix Barriga	$77,584
7th	(United States) Michael Minetti	$59,693
8th	(South Korea) Kevin Song (0/1)	$46,281
9th	(United States) Christopher Bucceri	$36,161

=== Event #60: $3,000 No-Limit Hold'em ===
- 4-Day Event: June 24–27
- Number of Entries: 1,773
- Total Prize Pool: $4,733,910
- Number of Payouts: 266
- Winning Hand: 10♣ 10♦

Final Table
Place	Name	Prize
1st	(Italy) Paolo Boi (1/1)	$676,990
2nd	(United States) Noel Rodriguez	$451,299
3rd	(Spain) Juan Vecino	$326,883
4th	(United States) Brandon Mitchell	$239,451
5th	(United States) Justin Belforti	$177,416
6th	(United Kingdom) Marc Foggin	$132,978
7th	(United States) Victor Paredes	$100,840
8th	(Canada) Vanessa Kade	$77,378
9th	(United States) Benjamin Gold	$60,088

=== Event #61: $2,500 Mixed: Omaha Hi-Lo 8/Seven Card Stud Hi-Lo 8 ===
- 3-Day Event: June 24–26
- Number of Entries: 507
- Total Prize Pool: $1,128,075
- Number of Payouts: 77
- Winning Hand: 6♣ 8♠ / 10♠ 9♠ 6♥ / J♦ (Seven Card Stud Hi-Lo 8 or Better)

Final Table
Place	Name	Prize
1st	(Italy) Dario Sammartino (1/1)	$222,703
2nd	(Norway) Jon Kyte	$148,462
3rd	(United States) David Williams (0/1)	$102,335
4th	(United States) Jeff Madsen (0/4)	$71,810
5th	(United States) Federico Ottenio	$51,315
6th	(United States) Matthew Vengrin	$37,354
7th	(United States) Joseph Couden (0/1)	$27,709
8th	(United States) Scott Blackman	$20,954

=== Event #62: $600 PokerNews Deepstack Championship No-Limit Hold'em ===
- 4-Day Event: June 25–28
- Number of Entries: 5,110
- Total Prize Pool: $2,606,100
- Number of Payouts: 767
- Winning Hand: A♠ 9♦

Final Table
Place	Name	Prize
1st	(United Kingdom) Hector Berry (1/1)	$282,876
2nd	(Canada) Luke Varrasso	$188,644
3rd	(United States) Harrison Ashdown	$140,264
4th	(United States) Branden Shimamoto	$105,122
5th	(United States) Darryll Fish	$79,418
6th	(Luxembourg) Sihao Zhang	$60,485
7th	(Canada) Jolan Mancini	$46,442
8th	(Republic of Ireland) Thomas Murphy	$35,953
9th	(United States) Kenny Huynh (0/1)	$28,064

=== Event #63: $1,500 No-Limit 2-7 Lowball Draw ===
- 3-Day Event: June 25–27
- Number of Entries: 453
- Total Prize Pool: $604,755
- Number of Payouts: 68
- Winning Hand: 9♠ 8♣ 7♠ 6♦ 4♣

Final Table
Place	Name	Prize
1st	(United States) David Funkhouser (1/1)	$123,314
2nd	(France) Michel Leibgorin	$81,412
3rd	(United States) Charles Tucker	$54,868
4th	(United States) Owais Ahmed (0/1)	$37,764
5th	(United States) Ali Eslami (0/1)	$26,555
6th	(Taiwan) Tzu Peng Wang	$19,087
7th	(United States) David "ODB" Baker (0/3)	$14,030

=== Event #64: $600 No-Limit Hold'em Deepstack ===
- 2-Day Event: June 26–27
- Number of Entries: 5,263
- Total Prize Pool: $2,684,130
- Number of Payouts: 790
- Winning Hand: K♠ 10♠

Final Table
Place	Name	Prize
1st	(United States) Christopher Moen (1/1)	$289,323
2nd	(Austria) Thomas Kuess	$192,809
3rd	(United States) Cody Chung	$143,258
4th	(United States) August Smrek	$107,289
5th	(United States) John Ricksen	$80,996
6th	(Israel) Gal Naim	$61,642
7th	(United States) Daniel Hirose	$47,295
8th	(Brazil) Guilherme De Castro	$36,586
9th	(United States) Vance Isono	$28,536

=== Event #65: $5,000 Seniors High Roller No-Limit Hold'em ===
- 3-Day Event: June 26–28
- Number of Entries: 680
- Total Prize Pool: $3,128,000
- Number of Payouts: 102
- Winning Hand: 10♥ 8♥

Final Table
Place	Name	Prize
1st	(United States) Mark Checkwicz (1/1)	$573,876
2nd	(Israel) Arie Kliper	$382,581
3rd	(United States) Michael Vela	$266,257
4th	(United States) Kevin Nathan (0/1)	$188,385
5th	(United States) Samuel Wagner	$135,543
6th	(France) Bruno Lopes	$99,203
7th	(United States) John Thornton	$73,877
8th	(United States) Richard Lowe	$55,998
9th	(United States) Angela Jordison	$43,216

=== Event #66: $10,000 Pot-Limit Omaha Championship ===
- 4-Day Event: June 26–29
- Number of Entries: 811
- Total Prize Pool: $7,542,300
- Number of Payouts: 122
- Winning Hand: 8♣ 5♦ 4♠ 3♥

Final Table
Place	Name	Prize
1st	(France) Elie Nakache (1/1)	$1,320,945
2nd	(United States) Joshua Adkins	$880,621
3rd	(United Kingdom) Jonathan Bowers	$615,251
4th	(United States) Manh Nguyen	$436,751
5th	(Israel) Oshri Lahmani	$315,098
6th	(Poland) Krzysztof Magott	$231,101
7th	(Finland) Eelis Pärssinen (0/1)	$172,355
8th	(France) David Benyamine (0/1)	$130,748

=== Event #67: $500 Salute to Warriors No-Limit Hold'em ===
- 3-Day Event: June 27–29
- Number of Entries: 4,517
- Total Prize Pool: $1,851,970
- Number of Payouts: 678
- Winning Hand: A♥ 8♥

Final Table
Place	Name	Prize
1st	(United Kingdom) Ben Collins (1/1)	$207,486
2nd	(Greece) Stavros Petychakis	$138,423
3rd	(United States) Tolga Gesli	$102,360
4th	(Bolivia) Paul Serrate	$76,338
5th	(Canada) Rami Hammoud	$57,420
6th	(New Zealand) Dane Harnett	$43,564
7th	(United States) Ben Snodgrass	$33,341
8th	(United States) Siavash Bahri	$25,742
9th	(Canada) Gerald Schnierer	$20,052

=== Event #68: $2,500 No-Limit Hold'em ===
- 3-Day Event: June 27–29
- Number of Entries: 2,229
- Total Prize Pool: $4,959,525
- Number of Payouts: 335
- Winning Hand: Q♣ 7♥

Final Table
Place	Name	Prize
1st	(United States) Colin Robinson (1/1)	$667,963
2nd	(United Kingdom) Carl Shaw (0/1)	$445,285
3rd	(United States) John Reiter	$325,744
4th	(Latvia) Vitalijs Zavorotnijs	$240,707
5th	(United States) Barry Shulman (0/2)	$179,687
6th	(Canada) Akshat Bajaj	$135,522
7th	(United States) Peter Park (1/1)	$103,279
8th	(Argentina) Gonzalo Almada	$79,537
9th	(Bulgaria) Ivan Stankov	$61,906

=== Event #69: $1,500 Seven Card Stud Hi-Lo 8 or Better ===
- 3-Day Event: June 27–29
- Number of Entries: 611
- Total Prize Pool: $815,685
- Number of Payouts: 92
- Winning Hand: 4♥ 4♦ / 5♠ A♥ 8♥ / 2♥

Final Table
Place	Name	Prize
1st	(Russia) Nikolay Fal (1/1)	$153,730
2nd	(Venezuela) Christian Roberts (0/1)	$102,492
3rd	(United States) Joseph Hertzog	$70,288
4th	(United States) Kenneth Kemple	$49,127
5th	(United States) Dekel Balas	$35,006
6th	(Israel) Yuval Bronshtein (0/2)	$25,442
7th	(United Kingdom) Nikolay Ponomarev	$18,866
8th	(United States) Jon Turner	$14,280

=== Event #70: $400 Colossus No-Limit Hold'em ===
- 3-Day Event: June 28–July 2
- Number of Entries: 19,303
- Total Prize Pool: $6,369,990
- Number of Payouts: 2,845
- Winning Hand: 7♠ 7♦

Final Table
Place	Name	Prize
1st	(Bulgaria) Martin Alcaide (1/1)	$501,250
2nd	(Singapore) Yujian Zhou	$325,640
3rd	(United States) Brooks Floyd	$247,030
4th	(United States) Joel Vanetten	$188,510
5th	(United States) Ricardo Andino	$144,700
6th	(Ukraine) Bohdan Slyvinskyi	$111,740
7th	(United States) Caleb Powell	$86,800
8th	(United States) Trevor Brown	$67,840
9th	(United States) Nicholas Richards	$53,354

=== Event #71: $1,000 Ladies Championship No-Limit Hold'em ===
- 4-Day Event: June 28–July 1
- Number of Entries: 1,245
- Total Prize Pool: $1,095,600
- Number of Payouts: 187
- Winning Hand: 9♠ 5♦

Final Table
Place	Name	Prize
1st	(Japan) Shiina Okamoto (1/1)	$171,732
2nd	(United States) Jamie Kerstetter	$114,479
3rd	(United States) Wei-Cheng Liao	$81,573
4th	(United States) Linda Durden	$58,910
5th	(Israel) Mor Kamber	$43,125
6th	(France) Cecile Ticherfatine	$32,007
7th	(United States) Susan Bluer	$24,090
8th	(Japan) Haruna Fujita	$18,390
9th	(United States) Andrea Sager	$14,242

=== Event #72: $10,000 No-Limit 2-7 Lowball Draw Championship ===
- 3-Day Event: June 28–30
- Number of Entries: 186
- Total Prize Pool: $1,729,800
- Number of Payouts: 28
- Winning Hand: 9♥ 7♠ 6♦ 5♠ 2♣

Final Table
Place	Name	Prize
1st	(United States) Scott Seiver (3/7)	$411,041
2nd	(Canada) Jonathan Krela	$274,217
3rd	(United States) David Lin	$187,177
4th	(United States) Jeremy Ausmus (0/6)	$130,794
5th	(United States) Jennifer Harman (0/2)	$93,615
6th	(Canada) Mike Watson	$68,672
7th	(United States) Aaron Kupin	$51,661

=== Event #73: $25,000 High Roller Pot-Limit Omaha ===
- 4-Day Event: June 29–July 2
- Number of Entries: 476
- Total Prize Pool: $11,186,000
- Number of Payouts: 72
- Winning Hand: A♣ Q♦ 9♣ 7♦

Final Table
Place	Name	Prize
1st	(United States) David Eldridge (1/2)	$2,246,728
2nd	(United States) Brian Rast (0/6)	$1,497,824
3rd	(United States) Ethan Cahn	$1,038,097
4th	(China) Yang Wang	$731,819
5th	(Finland) Juha Helppi (0/2)	$524,911
6th	(United States) Billy Tarango	$383,191
7th	(Israel) Liran Twito	$284,794
8th	(United States) Anuj Agarwal (0/1)	$215,563

=== Event #74: $10,000 Seven Card Stud Hi-Lo 8 or Better Championship ===
- 4-Day Event: June 30–July 3
- Number of Entries: 167
- Total Prize Pool: $1,553,100
- Number of Payouts: 26
- Winning Hand: Xx Xx / 4♥ 10♣ 4♠ / Xx

Final Table
Place	Name	Prize
1st	(United States) Arash Ghaneian (1/2)	$376,476
2nd	(United States) Richard Sklar	$250,984
3rd	(Canada) Thomas Taylor	$173,533
4th	(United States) Todd Brunson (0/1)	$122,663
5th	(United States) Eric Wasserson	$88,686
6th	(Italy) Dario Alioto (0/1)	$65,620
7th	(Russia) Andrey Zhigalov (0/1)	$49,715
8th	(United States) Michael Rocco	$38,589

=== Event #75: $1,000 Tag Team No-Limit Hold'em ===
- 3-Day Event: July 1–3
- Number of Entries: 1,437
- Total Prize Pool: $632,280
- Number of Payouts: 216
- Winning Hand: A♥ Q♣

Final Table
Place	Name	Prize
1st	(Canada) Jason James (1/1) (Canada) Jimmy Setna (1/1)	$190,910
2nd	(United States) Burcu Dagli (United States) Aaron Thomas	$127,254
3rd	(United States) Kevin Bagin (United States) Mark Bagin	$91,234
4th	(United States) Richard Ali (1/1) (United States) Patsy Altomari	$66,238
5th	(United States) Charles Honkonen (Canada) Joshua Hopkins	$48,708
6th	(United States) Anthony Nardi (United States) Jason Wheeler (1/1)	$36,282
7th	(Australia) Sheraton Hall (Australia) Malcolm Trayner (1/1)	$27,382
8th	(Brazil) Marcos Extercotter (United States) Henry Fischer	$20,942
9th	(United States) Angel Boas (United States) Toby Boas	$16,232

=== Event #76: $10,000 Mystery Bounty No-Limit Hold'em ===
- 3-Day Event: July 1–3
- Number of Entries: 965
- Total Prize Pool: $8,974,500
- Number of Payouts: 145
- Winning Hand: K♦ 9♣

Final Table
Place	Name	Prize
1st	(United States) Matthew Lambrecht (1/1)	$1,018,933
2nd	(United States) Damarjai Davenport	$678,707
3rd	(Brazil) Tauan Naves	$478,247
4th	(Lithuania) Simas Karaliunas (1/1)	$341,963
5th	(Russia) Vladimir Minko	$248,174
6th	(United States) Eshaan Bhalla	$182,846
7th	(Belarus) Andrey Konopelko	$136,792
8th	(Germany) Robert Heidorn	$103,942

=== Event #77: $2,500 Mixed Big Bet ===
- 3-Day Event: July 1–3
- Number of Entries: 468
- Total Prize Pool: $1,041,300
- Number of Payouts: 71
- Winning Hand: A♦ Q♣ Q♠ 10♦ (Pot-Limit Omaha)

Final Table
Place	Name	Prize
1st	(Hong Kong) Wing Po Liu (1/2)	$209,942
2nd	(United States) Hye Park	$136,574
3rd	(China) Xixiang Luo	$90,920
4th	(United States) Kane Kalas	$61,977
5th	(Germany) Andres Korn (0/1)	$43,283
6th	(United States) Alex Foxen (0/1)	$30,988

=== Event #78: $1,000 Mini Main Event ===
- 3-Day Event: July 2–4
- Number of Entries: 6,076
- Total Prize Pool: $5,346,880
- Number of Payouts: 912
- Winning Hand: A♣ 9♠

Final Table
Place	Name	Prize
1st	(Cyprus) Georgios Skarparis (1/1)	$554,925
2nd	(Italy) Alexandre Barbaranelli	$369,994
3rd	(Russia) Mikhail Zavoloka	$276,695
4th	(United States) Kyle Williamson	$208,444
5th	(Germany) Dirk Bruns	$158,191
6th	(United States) Joshua Prager	$120,950
7th	(United States) Kaihung Hu	$93,171
8th	(Switzerland) Stefan Widmer	$72,316
9th	(United States) Hunter Frey	$56,557

=== Event #79: $50,000 High Roller Pot-Limit Omaha ===
- 3-Day Event: July 2–4
- Number of Entries: 187
- Total Prize Pool: $8,929,250
- Number of Payouts: 29
- Winning Hand: A♠ K♠ 9♣ 2♣

Final Table
Place	Name	Prize
1st	(Germany) Daniel Perkusic (1/1)	$2,100,325
2nd	(Hong Kong) Danny Tang (0/1)	$1,400,217
3rd	(United States) Jim Collopy (0/3)	$973,882
4th	(Netherlands) Ronald Keijzer (0/1)	$692,232
5th	(India) Santhosh Suvarna (1/2)	$503,085
6th	(Ecuador) Gabriel Andrade	$374,020
7th	(France) David Benyamine (0/1)	$284,604
8th	(United States) Brian Rast (0/6)	$221,778

=== Event #80: $800 Independence Day Celebration No-Limit Hold'em ===
- 2-Day Event: July 3–4
- Number of Entries: 6,792
- Total Prize Pool: $4,781,568
- Number of Payouts: 983
- Winning Hand: 4♠ 4♦

Final Table
Place	Name	Prize
1st	(United States) Francis Anderson (1/1)	$501,040
2nd	(United States) Brent Lee	$324,925
3rd	(United States) Taylor Williams	$241,850
4th	(United States) Donald Beaver	$182,350
5th	(United States) Bamshad Azizi	$138,490
6th	(Israel) Tom Cohen	$105,960
7th	(United States) Martin Zamani (0/2)	$81,660
8th	(Brazil) Regina Sevilha	$63,410
9th	(Canada) Jaskaran Brar	$49,613

=== Event #81: $10,000 Main Event No-Limit Hold'em World Championship ===
- 10-Day Event: July 3–17
- Number of Entries: 10,112
- Total Prize Pool: $94,041,600
- Number of Payouts: 1,517
- Winning Hand: 8♦ 3♠

Final Table
Place	Name	Prize
1st	(United States) Jonathan Tamayo (1/1)	$10,000,000
2nd	(United States) Jordan Griff	$6,000,000
3rd	(Sweden) Niklas Astedt	$4,000,000
4th	(Canada) Jason Sagle	$3,000,000
5th	(Bulgaria) Boris Angelov	$2,500,000
6th	(Spain) Andres Gonzalez	$2,000,000
7th	(United States) Brian Kim (0/1)	$1,500,000
8th	(United States) Joe Serock (0/1)	$1,250,000
9th	(France) Malo Latinois	$1,000,000

=== Event #82: $1,000 No-Limit Hold'em ===
- 2-Day Event: July 6–7
- Number of Entries: 1,424
- Total Prize Pool: $1,253,120
- Number of Payouts: 214
- Winning Hand: 8♥ 6♥

Final Table
Place	Name	Prize
1st	(India) Aditya Agarwal (1/1)	$189,661
2nd	(Argentina) Augusto Hagen	$126,424
3rd	(United Kingdom) Jesse Wigan	$90,584
4th	(United States) Suhail Khan	$65,731
5th	(United States) Alexander Holtz	$48,313
6th	(United States) Frank Lagodich	$35,975
7th	(Canada) Tengqi Zhan	$27,143
8th	(United States) Robert Macri	$20,754
9th	(United States) Lucas Regier	$16,085

=== Event #83: $1,500 Eight Game Mix ===
- 3-Day Event: July 7–9
- Number of Entries: 494
- Total Prize Pool: $659,490
- Number of Payouts: 75
- Winning Hand: A♠ K♦ (No-Limit Hold'em)

Final Table
Place	Name	Prize
1st	(United States) Garth Yettick (1/1)	$131,061
2nd	(United States) Josh Arieh (0/6)	$85,667
3rd	(United States) John Cernuto (0/3)	$57,249
4th	(United States) John Racener (1/2)	$39,135
5th	(United States) Maxx Coleman (0/2)	$27,379
6th	(United States) Marco Johnson (0/2)	$19,614

=== Event #84: $600 Ultra Stack No-Limit Hold'em ===
- 3-Day Event: July 7–9
- Number of Entries: 6,628
- Total Prize Pool: $3,380,280
- Number of Payouts: 985
- Winning Hand: K♥ 8♥

Final Table
Place	Name	Prize
1st	(Germany) Carsten Heidemann (1/1)	$343,010
2nd	(United States) Ramana Epparla	$228,670
3rd	(Dominican Republic) Albyn Bello	$170,410
4th	(United States) Phuoc Nguyen	$127,950
5th	(United States) Jason Wester	$96,790
6th	(United States) Robert Szumowski	$73,780
7th	(United States) Juan Garibaldi	$56,670
8th	(United States) Arnold Park	$43,870
9th	(Vietnam) Thanh Ha Duong	$34,220

=== Event #85: $1,000 Flip & Go No-Limit Hold'em ===
- 2-Day Event: July 8–9
- Number of Entries: 1,088
- Total Prize Pool: $957,440
- Number of Payouts: 136
- Winning Hand: Q♦ J♥

Final Table
Place	Name	Prize
1st	(United States) Chance Kornuth (1/4)	$155,446
2nd	(Thailand) Kannapong Thanarattrakul	$103,633
3rd	(Canada) Mike Leah (0/1)	$74,062
4th	(United States) Sean Whelan	$53,662
5th	(United States) Xiaoyao Ma	$39,428
6th	(United States) Filipp Khavin	$29,382
7th	(Republic of Ireland) Ian Hamilton	$22,213
8th	(United States) John Armbrust	$17,039

=== Event #86: $1,000 Mystery Bounty Pot-Limit Omaha ===
- 3-Day Event: July 9–11
- Number of Entries: 4,280
- Total Prize Pool: $2,482,400
- Number of Payouts: 630
- Winning Hand: Q♥ 9♦ 6♠ 2♦

Final Table
Place	Name	Prize
1st	(Germany) Sascha Wilhelm (1/1)	$282,290
2nd	(United States) James Cavanaugh	$188,190
3rd	(Japan) Daisuke Ogita	$138,670
4th	(Israel) Amit Ben Yacov (0/1)	$103,050
5th	(Spain) Juan Maceiras	$77,240
6th	(United States) Adam Adams	$58,390
7th	(United States) Bryce Yockey (1/2)	$44,530
8th	(United States) Brandon Caputo	$34,250
9th	(Israel) Oshri Lahmani	$26,584

=== Event #87: $5,000 No-Limit Hold'em 8-Handed ===
- 2-Day Event: July 9–10
- Number of Entries: 1,041
- Total Prize Pool: $4,788,600
- Number of Payouts: 157
- Winning Hand: 7♥ 7♠

Final Table
Place	Name	Prize
1st	(United States) Matthew Alsante (1/1)	$785,486
2nd	(Thailand) Punnat Punsri	$523,648
3rd	(United States) Philip Wiszowaty	$372,446
4th	(Ukraine) Oleg Vasylchenko	$268,407
5th	(Azerbaijan) Ramin Hajiyev	$196,024
6th	(Spain) Jon Vallinas	$145,107
7th	(Japan) Hirokazu Kobayashi	$108,895
8th	(United Kingdom) Patrick Leonard (0/1)	$82,862

=== Event #88: $10,000 Eight Game Mix ===
- 3-Day Event: July 10–12
- Number of Entries: 189
- Total Prize Pool: $1,757,700
- Number of Payouts: 29
- Winning Hand: A♣ K♦ Q♠ 9♣ (Pot-Limit Omaha)

Final Table
Place	Name	Prize
1st	(United States) Calvin Anderson (1/5)	$413,446
2nd	(Japan) Dai Ishibashi	$271,351
3rd	(United States) Ali Eslami (0/1)	$182,938
4th	(Canada) Michael Watson	$126,780
5th	(United States) Paul Gunness	$90,389
6th	(United States) Thomas Koral (0/2)	$66,353

=== Event #89: $3,000 Mid-Stakes No-Limit Hold'em Championship ===
- 4-Day Event: July 11–14
- Number of Entries: 3,177
- Total Prize Pool: $8,482,590
- Number of Payouts: 477
- Winning Hand: K♥ 9♥

Final Table
Place	Name	Prize
1st	(France) Clement Richez (1/1)	$1,041,989
2nd	(United Kingdom) Adam Owen	$694,714
3rd	(United States) Alec Torelli	$517,525
4th	(China) Dong Chen (0/1)	$388,519
5th	(United States) David Uvaydov	$293,950
6th	(United States) Taylor Black	$224,152
7th	(Russia) Andrey Pateychuk	$172,285
8th	(Croatia) Boris Kuzmanovic	$133,479
9th	(United Kingdom) David Brehme	$104,248

=== Event #90: $1,500 Pot-Limit Omaha 6-Handed ===
- 3-Day Event: July 11–13
- Number of Entries: 1,304
- Total Prize Pool: $1,740,840
- Number of Payouts: 196
- Winning Hand: J♠ 9♦ 8♠ 8♥

Final Table
Place	Name	Prize
1st	(United States) Joseph Sanders (1/1)	$269,530
2nd	(Russia) Anatoliy Zlotnikov	$179,689
3rd	(Sweden) Alfred Karlsson	$124,984
4th	(United States) Long Tran	$88,273
5th	(Canada) Mike Leah (0/1)	$63,321
6th	(United States) Dustin Nelson	$46,144

=== Event #91: $3,000 H.O.R.S.E. ===
- 3-Day Event: July 11–13
- Number of Entries: 357
- Total Prize Pool: $953,190
- Number of Payouts: 54
- Winning Hand: Xx Xx / 3♦ 7♣ 5♥ / Xx (Seven Card Stud Hi-Lo 8 or Better)

Final Table
Place	Name	Prize
1st	(United States) Gary Bolden (1/1)	$206,321
2nd	(United States) John Racener (1/2)	$135,877
3rd	(United States) Travis Trail	$91,547
4th	(United Kingdom) David Tarbet	$63,134
5th	(United States) Luis Velador (0/2)	$44,591
6th	(United States) David "ODB" Baker (0/3)	$32,274
7th	(United States) Jeremy Ausmus (0/6)	$23,952
8th	(South Korea) Wooram Cho	$18,238

=== Event #92: $50,000 High Roller No-Limit Hold'em ===
- 3-Day Event: July 12–14
- Number of Entries: 178
- Total Prize Pool: $8,499,500
- Number of Payouts: 27
- Winning Hand: A♣ 4♣

Final Table
Place	Name	Prize
1st	(United States) Jared Bleznick (1/1)	$2,037,947
2nd	(United States) Jesse Lonis (0/2)	$1,358,633
3rd	(Germany) Christoph Vogelsang	$957,104
4th	(Argentina) Nacho Barbero (0/1)	$685,405
5th	(United States) Justin Saliba (0/2)	$499,097
6th	(Iceland) Brynjar Gigja	$369,654
7th	(Canada) Isai Scheinberg	$278,552
8th	(United States) Erik Seidel (0/10)	$213,624

=== Event #93: $777 Lucky 7's No-Limit Hold'em ===
- 3-Day Event: July 13–17
- Number of Entries: 6,292
- Total Prize Pool: $4,303,728
- Number of Payouts: 296
- Winning Hand: K♠ 4♠

Final Table
Place	Name	Prize
1st	(United States) Michael Liang (1/1)	$777,777
2nd	(United States) Duc Nguyen	$300,777
3rd	(United States) Rajesh Mehta	$190,777
4th	(United States) Manoj Batavia	$141,777
5th	(United States) Mitch Garshofsky	$105,777
6th	(Peru) Jorge Postigo	$80,777
7th	(Austria) Lukas Hafner	$60,777

=== Event #94: $10,000 No-Limit Hold'em Championship 6-Handed ===
- 3-Day Event: July 13–15
- Number of Entries: 502
- Total Prize Pool: $4,668,600
- Number of Payouts: 76
- Winning Hand: 4♠ 3♦

Final Table
Place	Name	Prize
1st	(United States) Michael Rocco (1/1)	$942,222
2nd	(France) Alexandre Reard (0/2)	$610,013
3rd	(Bulgaria) Aleks Dimitrov	$410,657
4th	(United States) Aram Zobian (0/1)	$282,302
5th	(Spain) Adrián Mateos (0/4)	$198,261
6th	(Moldova) Egor Procop	$142,316

=== Event #95: $1,979 Poker Hall of Fame Bounty No-Limit Hold'em ===
- 2-Day Event: July 14–15
- Number of Entries: 1,119
- Total Prize Pool: $1,970,906
- Number of Payouts: 167
- Winning Hand: 10♣ 3♣

Final Table
Place	Name	Prize
1st	(United Kingdom) Jamie Walden (1/1)	$313,370
2nd	(United States) Naseem Salem	$208,919
3rd	(United States) David Stamm	$148,183
4th	(United States) Adam Hendrix	$106,598
5th	(India) Ankit Ahuja	$77,787
6th	(Germany) Martin Finger (0/1)	$57,594
7th	(United States) Christopher Stevenson	$43,275
8th	(Japan) Akinobu Maeda	$33,006
9th	(Denmark) Henrik Juncker	$25,559

=== Event #96: $25,000 High Roller H.O.R.S.E. ===
- 3-Day Event: July 14–16
- Number of Entries: 120
- Total Prize Pool: $2,820,000
- Number of Payouts: 18
- Winning Hand: K♣ 7♦ (Limit Hold'em)

Final Table
Place	Name	Prize
1st	(China) Xixiang Luo (2/2)	$725,796
2nd	(Lebanon) Albert Daher	$483,866
3rd	(United States) Michael Moncek (0/2)	$336,442
4th	(United States) Phil Ivey (1/11)	$239,850
5th	(United States) Ryan Miller (0/2)	$175,423
6th	(United States) Scott Seiver (3/7)	$131,719
7th	(France) David Benyamine (0/1)	$101,608
8th	(United States) Adam Friedman (0/5)	$80,585
9th	(United States) Yueqi Zhu (0/1)	$65,761

=== Event #97: $3,000 Pot-Limit Omaha 6-Handed ===
- 3-Day Event: July 15–17
- Number of Entries: 844
- Total Prize Pool: $2,253,480
- Number of Payouts: 127
- Winning Hand: 10♠ 10♦ 7♦ 5♠

Final Table
Place	Name	Prize
1st	(Canada) Alex Livingston (1/2)	$390,621
2nd	(Uruguay) Francisco Benitez	$260,403
3rd	(United States) Martin Zamani	$177,114
4th	(United States) Andrew Watson	$122,746
5th	(Hong Kong) Hok Yiu Lee (0/1)	$86,709
6th	(United States) Christopher Roth	$62,457

=== Event #98: $1,500 No-Limit Hold'em The Closer ===
- 3-Day Event: July 15–17
- Number of Entries: 3,215
- Total Prize Pool: $4,292,025
- Number of Payouts: 480
- Winning Hand: A♦ A♥

Final Table
Place	Name	Prize
1st	(Taiwan) Ching Da Wu (1/1)	$525,500
2nd	(Italy) Mario Colavita	$350,370
3rd	(Romania) Bogdan Munteanu	$261,170
4th	(United States) John Racener (1/2)	$196,170
5th	(Germany) Stanislav Zegal (0/1)	$148,480
6th	(United States) Michael Baltierra	$113,270
7th	(Spain) David Cabrera Polop	$87,080
8th	(United States) Chad Lipton	$67,480
9th	(Venezuela) Luis Yepez	$52,705

=== Event #99: $1,000 Super Turbo No-Limit Hold'em ===
- 1-Day Event: July 17
- Number of Entries: 1,544
- Total Prize Pool: $1,358,720
- Number of Payouts: 232
- Winning Hand: 6♠ 6♦

Final Table
Place	Name	Prize
1st	(Lithuania) Aneris Adomkevicius (1/1)	$201,344
2nd	(United States) Mark Newhouse	$134,228
3rd	(United States) Theo Tran	$96,633
4th	(United States) Peter Bigelow	$70,409
5th	(United States) Kenneth Kim	$51,930
6th	(United States) John Holley	$38,776
7th	(Germany) Jakob Miegel	$29,317
8th	(China) Dong Chen (0/1)	$22,448
9th	(United Kingdom) Edward Small	$17,409
