= Yuri Dzivielevski =

Brazilian poker player (born 1991)

Yuri Martins Dzivielevski
- Nicknames: theNERDguy (PokerStars); Y Dzivielevski (GGPoker) jaimelavocat (Winamax) shitakemushu (888poker) xitaquemuxu (partypoker) samadhii (iPoker) xyuridzix (FullTilt Poker)
- Born: November 27, 1991 (age 34); Curitiba, Paraná, Brazil

World Series of Poker
- Bracelets: 6
- Final tables: 37
- Money finishes: 172
- Highest WSOP Main Event finish: 28th, 2019

World Poker Tour
- Title: None
- Final table: 1
- Money finishes: 5

European Poker Tour
- Title: 0
- Final tables: 4
- Money finishes: 8

Yuri Martins Dzivielevski is a Brazilian poker player.

== Poker career ==
Dzivielevski is a six-time bracelet winner at the WSOP. He won his first bracelet in a $2,500 Mixed Omaha Hi/Lo 8 or Better, Seven Card Stud Hi/Lo 8 or Better even in 2019. His second bracelet came in the 2020 WSOP Online in a Pot Limit Omaha event. In the 2023 WSOP and the 2023 WSOP Online, he won one bracelet in each format, one in H.O.R.S.E. and one in Pot Limit Omaha. He won his fifth bracelet at the 2024 WSOP in the $3,000 Nine-Game Mix event.

In June 2026, he won his sixth bracelet by topping 115 entries in Event #36: $100,000 High Roller at the 2026 World Series of Poker, defeating Teun Mulder heads-up for $2,841,432, the largest cash of his career. The win made him the 27th player to reach six WSOP bracelets.

In 2022, he was runner-up at the $50,000 Poker Players Championship event at the WSOP.

As of 2023, Dzivielevski's total live poker tournament winnings exceed $6,100,000.

=== Tournament poker (live) ===
==== World Series of Poker ====
Dzivielevski's first cash at the WSOP was in 2013 in the $1,000 No Limit Hold'em event; he won $19,939 in 12th place (from 2,100 players). His first bracelet came in 2019 at $2,500 Omaha/Seven Card Stud Hi-Lo 8 or Better where he won $213,750. Since then, he has won four more bracelets, including two at online WSOP events. He has 25 career WSOP final table appearances and 172 money finishes, including online WSOP events.

World Series of Poker bracelets
Year	Tournament	Players	Prize
2019	$2,500 Omaha/Seven Card Stud Hi-Lo 8 or Better (Event #51)	401	$213,750
2020(O)	$400 Plossus (Event #11)	4,356	$221,557
2023	$1,500 H.O.R.S.E. (Event #47)	836	$207,688
2023(O)	$10,000 Pot-Limit Omaha Championship (Event #24)	153	$368,343
2024	$3,000 Nine Game Mix (Event #53)	379	$215,982
2026	$100,000 High Roller No-Limit Hold’em (Event #36)	115	$2,841,432

An "(O)" following a year denotes bracelet(s) won at the World Series of Poker Online

==== European Poker Tour ====
Dzivielevski's first cash at the European Poker Tour was in 2014 at PokerStars Caribbean Adventure $10,000 No Limit Hold'em - Main Event, where he won $32,000 in 54th place of 1,031 players. He has four career EPT final table appearances and eight money finishes.

European Poker Tour Titles
Year	Tournament	Players	Prize
2022 EPT Monte Carlo	€ 25,000 No Limit Hold'em (Event #11)	74	€448,515

==== Latin American Poker Tour ====
Dzivielevski won the main event at the Latin American Poker Tour in 2015.

Latin American Poker Tour Titles
Year	Tournament	Players	Prize
2015 LAPT Brazil Grand Final	R$ 10,000 No Limit Hold'em - LAPT Grand Final	426	R$652,509 (~$175,155)

=== Tournament poker (online) ===
==== World Championship of Online Poker ====
Dzivielevski's nickname at PokerStars World Championship of Online Poker is theNERDguy. His first title was in 2015 at $1,050 PL Omaha Hi/Lo Championship [6-Max] with 272 players, where he cashed $59,840. He has since won eight more WCOOP titles.

World Championship of Online Poker Titles
Year	Tournament	Players	Prize
2015	$1,050 PL Omaha Hi/Lo Championship [6-Max]	272	$59,840
2020	09-H: $1,050 NL 2-7 Single Draw	74	$21,938
2020	20-H: $1,050 HORSE	127	$31,115
2020	48-H: $5,200 NLHE 8-Max, PKO, Sunday Slam	267	$245,535
2021	13-H: $1,050 FLO8 8-Max	98	$23,898
2021	80-H: $10,300 NLHE 8-Max, PKO, High Roller	106	$265,918
2021	88-H: $2,100 NLHE 8-Max, Turbo, PKO	190	$83,250
2023	WCOOP 20-H: $1050 PLO [6-Max]	182	$36,301
2024	WCOOP 39-M: $215 5-Card PLO [6-Max]	541	$19,144

==== Spring Championship of Online Poker ====
Dzivielevski's first Spring Championship of Online Poker (SCOOP) title was in 2021 at $215 HORSE with 448 players. He has since won four further SCOOP titles.

Spring Championship of Online Poker Titles
Year	Tournament	Players	Prize
2021	09-M: $215 HORSE	448	$17,024
2023	15-H: $10 300 NLHE [8-Max Super Tuesday High Roller]	76	$205,131
2023	68-H: $5 200 PLO [6-Max High Roller]	60	$93,217
2024	91-H: $2,100 PLO8	68	$136,000
2024	97-H: $530 FL Badugi [6-Max]	46	$25,000

==== GGPoker Online Championship ====
Dzivielevski has won the GGPoker Online Championship twice.

GG Online Championship Titles
Year	Tournament	Players	Prize
2022	45-H: $2.100 Omaholic Big Game Bounty	103	$57.497
2022	50-H: $5.250 Omaholic Bounty Super High Roller	61	$98.318

==== Other Titles in Online Poker ====
Notables Online Poker Titles*
Year	Plataform	nickname	Tournament	Players	Prize
2020	PokerStars	theNERDguy	Wednesday High Roller $1.050	40	$17.326
2020	PokerStars	theNERDguy	High Roller Club: Bounty Builder HR [KO Progressivo] $530	285	$28.771
2020	partypoker	xitaquemuxu	High Roller Club: Knockout $2.100	99	$42.421
2020	Natural8 (GG-Network)	Y Dzivielevski	High Rollers PLO Main Event $1.000	43	$26.798
2020	PokerStars	theNERDguy	Sunday Supersonic $1.050	78	$21.386
2020	GGPoker	Y Dzivielevski	Bounty Hunter Series - #137 PLO High Roller $2.100	147	$43.532
2020	GGPoker	Y Dzivielevski	WSOP Circuit: Blade Opener $2.500	107	$51.653
2020	Natural8 (GG-Network)	Y Dzivielevski	WSOP Circuit: #14 Fifty Stack $800	1.849	$178.236
2020	Natural8 (GG-Network)	Y Dzivielevski	High Rollers PLO Main Event $2.100	14	$18.154
2020	Natural8 (GG-Network)	Y Dzivielevski	High Rollers Blade Closer $ 2.625	63	$41.324
2021	PokerStars	theNERDguy	Bounty Builder High Rollers $530	242	$22.439
2021	partypoker	xitaquemuxu	MILLIONS Online #03 6-Max High Roller $10.300	57	$184.637
2021	Natural8 (GG-Network)	Y Dzivielevski	Super MILLION$ High Rollers $3.150	202	$408.406
2021	Natural8 (GG-Network)	Y Dzivielevski	Sunday High Roller Bounty King $3.150	78	$62.844
2021	Natural8 (GG-Network)	Y Dzivielevski	Omaholic Series: Side Event: High Roller $1.050	214	$40.348
2021	GGPoker	Y Dzivielevski	GG Spring Festival: #42-H Bounty Heater $2.100	204	$72.235
2021	Natural8 (GG-Network)	Y Dzivielevski	WSOP Circuit High Rollers: Deepstack Special $1.500	66	$22.545
2021	PokerStars	theNERDguy	Bounty Builder Turbo Series - #07 The Titans $5.200	118	$169.761
2021	PokerStars	theNERDguy	Bounty Builder Series - #137 Thursday Thril SE $1.050	210	$57.840
2021	PokerStars	theNERDguy	Winter Series: #08-H Sunday Warm-Up SE HR $1.050	398	$72.004
2022	PokerStars	theNERDguy	High Roller Club: Sunday Supersonic HR $1.050	63	$22.498
2022	Natural8 (GG-Network)	Y Dzivielevski	Super MILLION$ Week #13 Bounty Hunters HR Special $525	706	$51.480
2022	GGPoker	Y Dzivielevski	Sunday Super HR $25.500	27	$290.465
2022	PokerStars	theNERDguy	Super Tuesday $1.050	36	$14.124
2022	GGPoker	Y Dzivielevski	Bounty Hunters Super High Roller $5.250	43	$87.123
2022	GGPoker	Y Dzivielevski	Sunday Super HR $25.500	42	$293.063
2022	PokerStars	theNERDguy	Titans Event $5.200	68	$107.963
2023	GGPoker	Y Dzivielevski	WSOP Circuit: Tuesday SUPER HR $10.300	61	$159.249
2023	GGPoker	Y Dzivielevski	Sunday Prime Time $5.250	59	$73.899
2023	ACR Poker	SmashedAvocado	Online Super Series #174-H NLH $215	518	$19.684
2023	GGPoker	Y Dzivielevski	Bounty Hunters Super High Roller $5.250	26	$57.327
2023	GGPoker	Y Dzivielevski	PLO Sunday Deepstack HR $2.500	45	$33.760
2023	GGPoker	Y Dzivielevski	WSOP Online - Sunday GIANT $365	1.328	$57.708
2023	GGPoker	Y Dzivielevski	WSOP High Roller - PLO High Roller $2.100	27	$20.272
2023	GGPoker	Y Dzivielevski	WSOP High Roller - Deepstack HR $5.250	24	$51.119
2023	GGPoker	Y Dzivielevski	Bounty Hunters Super High Roller $5.250	25	$60.067
2023	PokerStars	theNERDguy	Bounty Builder Series - Titans Event $5.200	73	$133.515
2024	GGPoker	Y Dzivielevski	GGMillion$ High Rollers $10.300	152	$308.956
2024	GGPoker	Y Dzivielevski	GG World Festival #253-S Daily Warm-Up HR $2.625	?	$35.743
2024	GGPoker	Y Dzivielevski	Tuesday Classic Super HR $10.300	56	$159.994
2024	GGPoker	Y Dzivielevski	Sunday Showdown HR Mystery Bounty $1.500	369	$51.883
2024	ACR Poker (Ya Poker)	vousconfus	Online Super Series XL Main Event (High) $2.650	962	$465.317
2025	ACR Poker	SmashedAvocado	Moorman’s Sunday Saver $1.050	124	$26.280

*Titles from 2020-2025
