= Chance Kornuth =

American poker player

Chances Cards
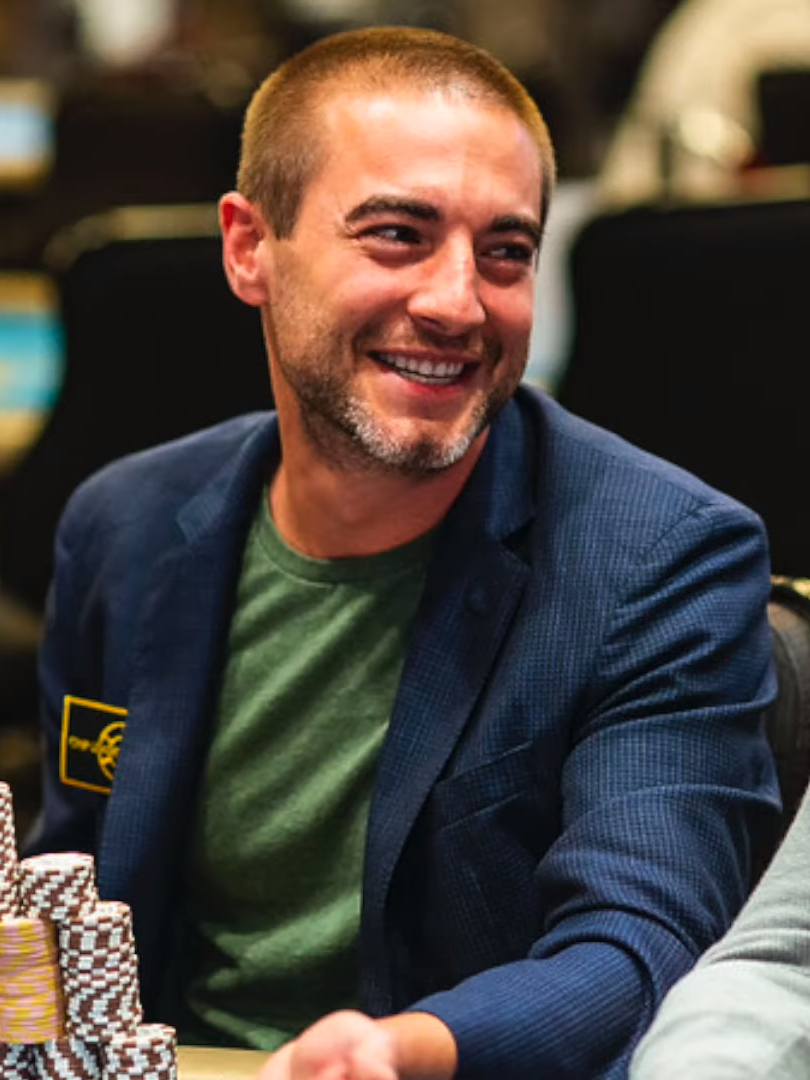
- Kornuth in 2020

Personal information
- Name: Chance Kornuth
- Born: Denver, Colorado, United States

Current team
- Team: Chip Leader Coaching
- Role: Poker player Poker coach
- Game: No Limit Texas Hold'em
- League: Global Poker Index

Career information
- Playing career: 2008–present
- Coaching career: 2016–present

Career highlights and awards
- 2nd in the $50,000 No Limit Hold'em (Bracelet Event #39) (WSOP 2024) ($1,351,000). 5th in the $250,000 No Limit Hold'em (Bracelet Event #40) (WSOP 2023) ($1,202,318)

Chance Kornuth, also known as Chances Cards and BingShui, is an American professional poker player. He has over 19 million in live earnings. He has 4 WSOP bracelets. He studied civil engineering at University of Colorado.

== World Series of Poker ==
Kornuth has 22 final table appearances at the WSOP with 96 total cashes as of June 2025. He currently has over 10 million in WSOP earnings.

=== World Series of Poker bracelets ===
Year	Tournament	Prize (US$)
2010	$5,000 Pot-Limit Omaha	$508,090
2018O	$3,200 WSOP.com ONLINE No-Limit Hold'em High Roller	$341,599
2021	$10,000 Short Deck No-Limit Hold'em	$194,670
2024	$1,000 FLIP & GO No-Limit Hold'em Presented by GG	$155,446

An "O" following a year denotes bracelet(s) won during the World Series of Poker Online
