= Doyles Room =

Online poker room

- Website type: Gambling
- Founded: 2004
- Dissolved: October 2011
- Headquarters: Curaçao, Netherlands Antilles
- Industry: Gambling
- Website: Official website (2004 archive)
- Current status: Defunct

Doyles Room was an online poker room created in 2004. The site was named after Doyle Brunson, a poker professional. In October 2011, Americas Cardroom acquired Doyles Room. Brunson had recently cut ties with Doyles Room following the domain seizures of PokerStars, Absolute Poker, Full Tilt Poker, and Ultimate Bet on April 15, 2011, by the Department of Justice, in United States v. Scheinberg.

== History ==
Doyles Room was established in 2004. Originally on the Tribeca Poker Network (now part of the Playtech iPoker network), Doyles Room moved to the Microgaming (Prima) Poker Network in 2007, then to the Cake Poker Network in January 2009, and then to the Yatahay Network in January 2011.

Named for Doyle Brunson, the 10-time World Series of Poker bracelet winner, the Doyle Brunson Poker Network was licensed and incorporated in Curaçao, Netherlands Antilles with the website also stating "Letter of Intent from Malta Lotteries and Gaming Authority Received".

Doyles Room offered several poker card game options, including Texas hold 'em, Badugi, Seven-card stud, and Omaha hold 'em. Additionally, the poker room hosted regular tournaments featuring poker personalities such as Doyle Brunson, Mike Caro, Todd Brunson, Hoyt Corkins, Alec Torelli and Cyndy Violette.

On May 26, 2011, Doyles Room was seized following an investigation into the violation of online gambling laws. After the events of April 15, Doyle Brunson cut ties with Doyles Room.

In October 2011, Doyles Room was acquired by Americas Cardroom.
