= 2024 World Series of Poker =

Series of poker tournaments

- Location: Horseshoe Las Vegas and Paris Las Vegas, Las Vegas, Nevada
- Dates: May 28 – July 17

Champion
- (United States) Jonathan Tamayo

The 2024 World Series of Poker (WSOP) was the 55th edition of the World Series of Poker, an annual series of poker tournaments. It was held from May 28 – July 17 at the Horseshoe Las Vegas and Paris Las Vegas in Las Vegas, Nevada. The $10,000 No-Limit Hold'em Main Event began on July 3, with the champion being determined on July 17.

The series featured 99 bracelet events. New tournament formats included a Pot-Limit Omaha Mystery Bounty event, two Seniors events including a $5,000 Seniors High Roller event, and a Mixed No-Limit Hold'em/Pot-Limit Omaha Double Bomb Pot event.

== Schedule ==
Key: (bracelets won in 2024/bracelets won in career)

High stakes event ($10,000+ buy-in).
No points awarded towards Player of the Year.
Online event.
Online event, with in-person final table.

#	Event	Entrants	Winner	Prize	Runner-up	Results
1	$5,000 Champions Reunion No-Limit Hold'em Freezeout	493	(United States) Asher Conniff (1/1)	$408,468	(Turkey) Halil Tasyurek	Results
2	$500 Casino Employees No-Limit Hold'em	1,189	(United States) Jose Garcia (1/1)	$79,134	(United States) Richard Rothmeier	Results
3	$500 WSOP Kickoff No-Limit Hold'em Freezeout	3,485	(United Kingdom) Daniel Willis (1/1)	$175,578	(United States) Michael Wang (0/2)	Results
4	$1,500 Omaha Hi-Lo 8 or Better	928	(United States) James Chen (1/1)	$209,350	(United States) Lewis Brandt	Results
5	$1,000 Mystery Millions No-Limit Hold'em	18,409	(Australia) Malcolm Trayner (1/1)	$1,000,000	(United States) Carson Richards	Results
6	$25,000 Heads-Up No-Limit Hold'em Championship	64	(United Kingdom) Darius Samual (1/1)	$500,000	(United States) Faraz Jaka (0/1)	Results
7	$1,500 Dealers Choice	530	(United States) John Hennigan (1/7)	$138,296	(United Kingdom) Robert Wells	Results
8	$5,000 Pot-Limit Omaha	733	(United States) Bryce Yockey (1/2)	$606,654	(Colombia) Farid Jattin	Results
9	$1,500 Limit Hold'em	443	(United States) Nick Guagenti (1/2)	$121,074	(United States) Joseph Brodsky	Results
10	$10,000 Omaha Hi-Lo 8 or Better Championship	171	(United States) Scott Seiver (1/5)	$426,744	(Canada) Jonathan Cohen (0/1)	Results
o1	$555 No-Limit Hold'em 55th Annual Kick-off	1,544	(Belgium) Miguel Use (1/1)	$106,613	(United States) Stephen Hemsworth	
11	$1,500 Badugi	487	(United States) David Prociak (1/2)	$129,676	(United States) Matt Grapenthien (0/1)	Results
o2	$400 No-Limit Hold'em PKO	1,962	(United States) Stanton Tentnowski (1/1)	$39,732+bounties	(United States) Corbin White	
12	$1,500 No-Limit Hold'em 6-Handed	2,526	(Bulgaria) Simeon Spasov (1/2)	$439,815	(United States) John Gordon	Results
13	$10,000 Dealers Choice Championship	124	(United States) Robert Mizrachi (1/5)	$333,045	(United States) Michael Martinelli	Results
14	$1,000 Super Turbo Bounty No-Limit Hold'em	2,639	(France) Thibault Perissat (1/1)	$197,308	(Canada) Ron Schindelheim	Results
15	$1,500 Pot-Limit Omaha Hi-Lo 8 or Better	1,277	(United States) Caleb Furth (1/1)	$265,361	(China) Gan Jiang	Results
16	$5,000 No-Limit Hold'em	660	(United States) Brent Hart (1/1)	$660,284	(United States) Edward Ochana	Results
o3	$1,000 No-Limit Hold'em	809	(United States) Evan Sandberg (1/2)	$124,831	(Israel) Uri Reichenstein	
17	$800 No-Limit Hold'em Deepstack	4,732	(United States) Timothy Murphy (1/1)	$368,977	(United States) Raymond Mancini	Results
18	$1,500 Pot-Limit Omaha	1,469	(United States) Dylan Weisman (1/2)	$294,311	(United States) Chino Rheem	Results
19	$10,000 Limit Hold'em Championship	104	(United States) John Racener (1/2)	$308,930	(United States) Chad Eveslage (0/3)	Results
20	$300 Gladiators of Poker No-Limit Hold'em	20,647	(United States) Stephen Winters (1/1)	$401,210	(United States) Simon Britton	Results
21	$25,000 High Roller No-Limit Hold'em	272	(United States) Brek Schutten (1/1)	$1,405,641	(United States) Tyler Stafman	Results
22	$1,500 Limit 2–7 Lowball Triple Draw	574	(United States) Aaron Cummings (1/1)	$146,516	(Japan) Yuichi Kanai	Results
23	$1,500 No-Limit Hold'em Shootout	1,534	(United States) Daniel Sepiol (1/1)	$305,849	(Philippines) Robert Natividad	Results
24	$10,000 Pot-Limit Omaha Hi-Lo 8 or Better Championship	259	(United States) Sean Troha (1/3)	$536,713	(United States) Tyler Brown (0/1)	Results
25	$3,000 Limit Hold'em 6-Handed	248	(United States) Daniel Vampan (1/1)	$148,635	(United Kingdom) Robert Wells	Results
o4	$600 No-Limit Hold'em Deepstack	1,565	(United States) Robert Strunk (1/1)	$116,708	(Costa Rica) Michael Acevedo	
26	$25,000 High Roller No-Limit Hold'em	318	(United States) Nick Schulman (1/5)	$1,667,842	(United States) Noel Rodriguez	Results
27	$1,500 Big O	1,555	(United States) Michael Christ (1/1)	$306,884	(United States) Matthew Beinner	Results
o5	$333 No-Limit Hold'em Triple Treys	2,714	(Czech Republic) Roman Hrabec (1/1)	$100,228	(United States) Derek Scott	
28	$1,500 No-Limit Hold'em Freezeout	2,317	(United States) Evan Benton (1/1)	$412,484	(United States) Balakrishna Patur	Results
29	$10,000 Limit 2–7 Triple Draw Championship	149	(United States) Phil Ivey (1/11)	$347,440	(United States) Danny Wong (0/1)	Results
30	$600 Mixed No-Limit Hold'em/Pot-Limit Omaha Deepstack	3,351	(Canada) Alen Bakovic (1/1)	$207,064	(United States) Brian Etheridge	Results
31	$3,000 No-Limit Hold'em 6-Handed	1,230	(United States) Nicholas Seward (1/1)	$516,135	(Ukraine) Konstantyn Holskyi	Results
32	$1,500 Seven Card Stud	406	(United Kingdom) Richard Ashby (1/2)	$113,725	(United Kingdom) Adam Owen	Results
o6	$400 No-Limit Hold'em Ultra Deepstack	2,238	(United States) Russell Brooks (1/1)	$99,181	(United States) Erik Eshima	
33	$600 Pot-Limit Omaha Deepstack	2,402	(Chile) Alex Manzano (1/1)	$161,846	(United States) Robert Gill	Results
34	$2,500 No-Limit Hold'em Freezeout	1,267	(Spain) Antonio Galiana (1/1)	$439,395	(France) Johan Guilbert	Results
35	$1,500 H.O.R.S.E.	835	(United States) Phil Hui (1/4)	$193,545	(Australia) Daniel Mayoh	Results
36	$800 No-Limit Hold'em Deepstack	4,278	(Israel) Timur Margolin (1/3)	$342,551	(Azerbaijan) Agharazi Babayev	Results
37	$10,000 Big O Championship	332	(United States) John Fauver (1/1)	$681,998	(United States) Calvin Anderson (0/4)	Results
38	$1,500 Monster Stack No-Limit Hold'em	8,703	(Portugal) Pedro Neves (1/1)	$1,098,220	(United States) Aaron Johnson	Results
39	$50,000 High Roller No-Limit Hold'em	177	(Spain) Sergio Aido (1/1)	$2,026,506	(United States) Chance Kornuth (0/3)	Results
40	$1,500 Razz	547	(United States) Scott Seiver (2/6)	$141,374	(United States) Brandon Shack-Harris (0/2)	Results
41	$1,500 Mixed No-Limit Hold'em/Pot-Limit Omaha Double Board Bomb Pot	1,312	(China) Xixiang Luo (1/1)	$270,820	(Australia) Daniel Hachem	Results
42	$10,000 Seven Card Stud Championship	107	(Australia) James Obst (1/2)	$260,658	(United States) Paul Volpe (0/3)	Results
o7	$500 No-Limit Hold'em PKO	1,603	(North Macedonia) Ilija Savevski (1/2)	$40,577+bounties	(United States) Jonah LaBranche	
43	$1,500 Mixed Omaha	853	(Sweden) Magnus Edengren (1/1)	$196,970	(United States) Tim Seidensticker	Results
o8	$1,000 No-Limit Hold'em 6-Max	1,233	(United States) Sungbin Ma (1/1)	$153,250	(United States) Michael Bosco	
44	$2,000 No-Limit Hold'em	1,561	(United States) Jared Kingery (1/1)	$410,359	(United States) Javier Gomez	Results
45	$10,000 H.O.R.S.E. Championship	181	(Russia) Maksim Pisarenko (1/1)	$399,988	(Canada) Mike Leah (0/1)	Results
46	$1,000 Seniors No-Limit Hold'em Championship	7,954	(United States) Khang Pham (1/1)	$677,326	(United States) Marc Wolpert	Results
47	$100,000 High Roller No-Limit Hold'em	112	(United States) Chris Hunichen (1/1)	$2,838,389	(United States) Jeremy Ausmus (0/6)	Results
48	$1,000 Pot-Limit Omaha	2,212	(United States) Christopher Vitch (1/3)	$262,734	(Canada) Thomas Taylor	Results
o9	$3,200 No-Limit Hold'em High Roller	401	(Greece) Georgios Sotiropoulos (1/4)	$224,418	(Italy) Dario Marinelli	
49	$3,000 No-Limit Hold'em Freezeout	1,252	(Norway) Erlend Melsom (1/1)	$523,195	(Bulgaria) Nikolay Yosifov	Results
50	$10,000 Razz Championship	118	(United States) George Alexander (1/1)	$282,443	(Poland) Dzmitry Urbanovich	Results
51	$1,500 Super Turbo Bounty No-Limit Hold'em	2,110	(United States) Peter Park (1/1)	$240,724	(United States) Mark Dube	Results
52	$5,000 No-Limit Hold'em 6-Handed	817	(Australia) Mostafa Haidary (1/1)	$656,747	(Germany) Bernd Gleissner (0/1)	Results
53	$3,000 Nine Game Mix	379	(Brazil) Yuri Dzivielevski (1/5)	$215,982	(United States) Nicholas Julia (0/1)	Results
54	$1,500 Millionaire Maker No-Limit Hold'em	10,939	(Argentina) Franco Spitale (1/1)	$1,250,125	(United States) Justin Carey	Results
55	$250,000 Super High Roller No-Limit Hold'em	75	(India) Santhosh Suvarna (1/2)	$5,415,152	(United States) Ben Tollerene	Results
56	$2,500 Mixed Triple Draw Lowball	371	(United States) Patrick Moulder (1/1)	$177,045	(Canada) Ian Chan	Results
57	$10,000 Super Turbo Bounty No-Limit Hold'em	486	(United States) Frank Funaro (1/2)	$612,997	(Japan) Shota Nakanishi (0/1)	Results
o10	$600 No-Limit Hold'em Monsterstack	1,781	(United States) Joshua Remitio (1/1)	$125,412	(United States) Josh Arieh (0/6)	
58	$50,000 Poker Players Championship	89	(Canada) Daniel Negreanu (1/7)	$1,178,703	(United States) Bryce Yockey (1/2)	Results
o11	$500 No-Limit Hold'em Mystery Bounty	3,462	(Lithuania) Simas Karaliunas (1/1)	$122,716	(United States) Luis Noboa	
o12	$888 No-Limit Hold'em Crazy 8s	1,366	(United Kingdom) Ryan Otto (1/1)	$150,916	(United States) Nithin Eapen	
59	$1,000 Super Seniors No-Limit Hold'em	3,362	(United States) Sean Jazayeri (1/1)	$358,025	(Turkey) Yucel Eminoglu	Results
60	$3,000 No-Limit Hold'em	1,773	(Italy) Paolo Boi (1/1)	$676,990	(United States) Pedro Rodriguez	Results
61	$2,500 Omaha Hi-Lo/Seven Card Stud Hi-Lo	507	(Italy) Dario Sammartino (1/1)	$222,703	(Norway) Jon Kyte	Results
62	$600 PokerNews Deepstack Championship No-Limit Hold'em	5,110	(United Kingdom) Hector Berry (1/1)	$282,876	(Canada) Luke Varrasso	Results
63	$1,500 No-Limit 2–7 Lowball Draw	453	(United States) David Funkhouser (1/1)	$123,314	(France) Michel Leibgorin	Results
o13	$1,000 No-Limit Hold'em Freezeout	824	(United States) Charlie Dawson (1/1)	$114,800	(United States) Zachary Vankeuren	
64	$600 No-Limit Hold'em Deepstack	5,263	(United States) Christopher Moen (1/1)	$289,323	(Austria) Thomas Kuess	Results
65	$5,000 Seniors High Roller No-Limit Hold'em	680	(United States) Mark Checkwicz (1/1)	$573,876	(Israel) Arie Kliper	Results
66	$10,000 Pot-Limit Omaha Championship	811	(France) Elie Nakache (1/1)	$1,320,945	(United States) Joshua Adkins	Results
67	$500 Salute to Warriors No-Limit Hold'em	4,517	(United Kingdom) Ben Collins (1/1)	$207,486	(Greece) Stavros Petychakis	Results
68	$2,500 No-Limit Hold'em	2,229	(United States) Colin Robinson (1/1)	$667,963	(United Kingdom) Carl Shaw (0/1)	Results
69	$1,500 Seven Card Stud Hi-Lo 8 or Better	611	(Russia) Nikolay Fal (1/1)	$153,730	(Venezuela) Christian Roberts (0/1)	Results
70	$400 Colossus No-Limit Hold'em	10,143	(Bulgaria) Martin Alcaide (1/1)	$501,240	(Singapore) Yujian Eugen Zhou	Results
71	$10,000/$1,000 Ladies No-Limit Hold'em Championship	1,245	(Japan) Shiina Okamoto (1/1)	$171,732	(United States) Jamie Kerstetter	Results
72	$10,000 No-Limit 2–7 Lowball Draw Championship	186	(United States) Scott Seiver (3/7)	$411,041	(Canada) Jonathan Krela	Results
73	$25,000 High Roller Pot-Limit Omaha	476	(United States) David Eldridge (1/2)	$2,246,728	(United States) Brian Rast (0/6)	Results
o14	$5,300 No-Limit Hold'em High Roller 8-Max	267	(Austria) Roland Rokita (1/1)	$278,713	(United States) Jed Hoffman (0/1)	
74	$10,000 Seven Card Stud Hi-Lo 8 or Better Championship	167	(United States) Arash Ghaneian (1/2)	$376,476	(United States) Richard Sklar	Results
o15	$500 No-Limit Hold'em Deepstack	2,435	(United States) Tony Dunst (1/3)	$134,888	(France) Leo Lombardozzi	
75	$1,000 Tag Team No-Limit Hold'em	1,437	(Canada) Jason James (1/1) (Canada) Jimmy Setna (1/1)	$190,910	(United States) Burcu Dagli (United States) Aaron Thomas	Results
76	$10,000 Mystery Bounty No-Limit Hold'em	965	(United States) Matthew Lambrecht (1/1)	$1,018,933	(United States) Damarjai Davenport	Results
77	$2,500 Mixed Big Bet	468	(Hong Kong) Wing Po Liu (1/2)	$209,942	(United States) Hye Park	Results
78	$1,000 Mini Main Event	6,076	(Cyprus) Georgios Skarparis (1/1)	$554,925	(Italy) Alexandre Barbarabelli	Results
79	$50,000 High Roller Pot-Limit Omaha	131	(Germany) Daniel Perkusic (1/1)	$2,100,325	(Hong Kong) Danny Tang (0/1)	Results
o16	$777 No-Limit Hold'em Lucky 7s	1,694	(United States) Millard Hale (1/1)	$207,515	(United States) Jeffery Hoop (0/1)	
80	$800 Independence Day Celebration No-Limit Hold'em	6,792	(United States) Francis Anderson (1/1)	$501,040	(United States) Brent Lee	Results
81	$10,000 Main Event No-Limit Hold'em World Championship	10,112	(United States) Jonathan Tamayo (1/1)	$10,000,000	(United States) Jordan Griff	Results
o17	$555 Pot Limit Omaha Mystery Bounty 6-Max	1,970	(United States) Jared Hyman (1/1)	$95,844	(United States) Stephen Sola	
o18	$600 No-Limit Hold'em Deepstack Championship	1,448	(United States) David Prociak (2/3)	$107,984	(Singapore) Thai Yong Wong	
82	$1,000 No-Limit Hold'em	1,424	(India) Aditya Agarwal (1/1)	$189,661	(Argentina) Augusto Hagen	Results
83	$1,500 Eight Game Mix	494	(United States) Garth Yettick (1/1)	$131,061	(United States) Josh Arieh (0/6)	Results
84	$600 Ultra Stack No-Limit Hold'em	6,628	(Germany) Carsten Heidemann (1/1)	$343,010	(United States) Ramana Epparla	Results
o19	$1,000 No-Limit Hold'em Mystery Bounty Championship	1,963	(United States) Daniel Chan (1/3)	$165,178	(United States) Jesse Yaginuma (0/2)	
o20	$400 No-Limit Hold'em Colossus	1,544	(Denmark) Johan Schultz-Pedersen (1/1)	$149,745	(United States) Jonathan Dokler (0/1)	
85	$1,000 Flip & Go No-Limit Hold'em	1,088	(United States) Chance Kornuth (1/4)	$155,446	(Thailand) Kannapong Thanarattrakul	Results
o21	$1,000 No-Limit Hold'em 6-Max Championship	1,052	(Canada) Mike Watson (1/1)	$138,327	(United States) Michael McNeill	
86	$1,000 Mystery Bounty Pot-Limit Omaha	4,280	(Germany) Sascha Wilhelm (1/1)	$282,290	(United States) James Cavanaugh	Results
87	$5,000 No-Limit Hold'em	1,042	(United States) Matthew Alsante (1/1)	$785,486	(Thailand) Punnat Punsri	Results
o22	$1,000 No-Limit Hold'em Championship	1,059	(United States) Christopher Moon (1/1)	$139,248	(United States) Joe Kuether	
88	$10,000 Eight Game Mix	189	(United States) Calvin Anderson (1/5)	$413,446	(Japan) Dai Ishibashi	Results
o23	$5,300 No-Limit Hold'em High Roller Championship	265	(United States) Brandon Wittmeyer (1/2)	$258,375	(United States) Jacob Snider	
89	$3,000 Mid-Stakes No-Limit Hold'em Championship	3,177	(France) Clement Richez (1/1)	$1,041,989	(United Kingdom) Adam Owen	Results
90	$1,500 Pot-Limit Omaha 6-Handed	1,304	(United States) Joseph Sanders (1/1)	$269,530	(Russia) Anatoliy Zlotnikov	Results
91	$3,000 H.O.R.S.E.	357	(United States) Gary Bolden (1/1)	$206,321	(United States) John Racener (1/2)	Results
o24	$10,000 WSOP Online Championship Event	134	(United States) Daniel Maor (1/1)	$330,263	(United States) Wayne Harmon	
92	$50,000 High Roller No-Limit Hold'em	150	(United States) Jared Bleznick (1/1)	$2,037,947	(United States) Jesse Lonis (0/2)	Results
o25	$1,000 Pot Limit Omaha 6-Max Championship	923	(United States) Mohammed Nuwwarah (1/1)	$135,172	(United States) Maximilian Schindler	
93	$777 Lucky 7's No-Limit Hold'em	6,292	(United States) Michael Liang (1/1)	$777,777	(United States) Duc Nguyen	Results
94	$10,000 No-Limit Hold'em 6-Handed Championship	418	(United States) Michael Rocco (1/1)	$924,922	(France) Alexandre Reard (0/2)	Results
o26	$3,200 No-Limit Hold'em High Roller	345	(United States) Zachary Vankeuren (1/1)	$219,450	(United States) Daniel Sepiol (1/1)	
95	$1,979 Poker Hall of Fame Bounty No-Limit Hold'em	1,119	(United Kingdom) Jamie Walden (1/1)	$313,370	(United States) Naseem Salem	Results
96	$25,000 High Roller H.O.R.S.E.	120	(China) Xixiang Luo (2/2)	$725,796	(Lebanon) Albert Daher	Results
o27	$400 No-Limit Hold'em Mystery Bounty 6-Max	2,778	(Spain) Daniel Triana (1/1)	$92,336	(United States) Brian Wood (0/1)	
97	$3,000 Pot-Limit Omaha 6-Handed	844	(Canada) Alex Livingston (1/2)	$390,621	(Uruguay) Francisco Benitez	Results
98	$1,500 No-Limit Hold'em The Closer	3,215	(Taiwan) Ching Da Wu (1/1)	$525,500	(Italy) Mario Colavita	Results
o28	$500 No-Limit Hold'em Summer Saver	1,699	(United States) Michael Mosley (1/1)	$99,698	(United States) Brandon Zuidema	
99	$1,000 Super Turbo No-Limit Hold'em	1,544	(Lithuania) Aneris Adomkevicius (1/1)	$201,355	(United States) Mark Newhouse	Results
o29	$1,000 No-Limit Hold'em PKO Fight Night	717	(Brazil) Júlio Fantin (1/1)	$45,558	(United States) Andy Bloch (0/1)	
o30	$888 No-Limit Hold'em Crazy 8s Encore	931	(United States) Michael Mizrachi (1/6)	$108,815	(United States) Mitch Garshofsky	

=== Pennsylvania Online ===
#	Event	Entrants	Winner	Prize	Runner-up
o1	$500 No-Limit Hold'em Bankroll Builder	217	(United States) Frank Bonacci (1/1)	$20,731	(United States) Justus Marsico
o2	$400 No-Limit Hold'em PKO	267	(United States) Zachary Gruneberg (1/1)	$8,392+bounties	(United States) Ryan McCusker
o3	$500 No-Limit Hold'em Deepstack Turbo	170	(United States) Kyle Miller (1/1)	$17,151	(United States) Jacob Smith
o4	$500 No-Limit Hold'em Mystery Bounty	231	(United States) Troy Laypo (1/1)	$11,454	(United States) Thomas Lobbe
o5	$600 No-Limit Hold'em Monsterstack	202	(United States) Kyle Wallace (1/1)	$23,158	(United States) David Evans
o6	$333 No-Limit Hold'em	234	(United States) William Nunley (1/1)	$14,903	(United States) Gregory Soroka
o7	$500 No-Limit Hold'em Summer Saver	219	(United States) Kyle Lorenz (1/2)	$20,922	(United States) Alex Schwint (0/1)

== Player of the Year ==
Final standings as of July 17

- A new rule introduced in 2024 restricts the total points that any player is able to accumulate to those won from their 10 best events across the series, including a maximum of one online event.
- Does not include events from the 2024 WSOP Online series, the 2024 WSOP Europe series, or the 2024 WSOP Paradise series.

Standings
Rank	Name	Points	Bracelets
1	(United States) Scott Seiver	4,403.85	3
2	(United States) Michael Rocco	3,803.67	1
3	(United States) Jeremy Ausmus	3,686.60	0
4	(United States) John Racener	3,557.10	1
5	(China) Xixiang Luo	3,480.93	2
6	(United States) Chance Kornuth	3,379.99	1
7	(United States) David Prociak	3,274.87	2
8	(United States) Chris Hunichen	3,094.85	1
9	(Brazil) Yuri Dzivielevski	3,033.64	1
10	(United States) Phil Ivey	3,004.04	1

== Main Event ==
The $10,000 No-Limit Hold'em Main Event began on July 3 with the first of four starting flights. The event attracted 10,112 entries, making it the largest Main Event field in WSOP history. The top 1,517 players earned a part of the $94,041,600 prize pool, with the champion earning $10,000,000.

The final table was reached on July 14 and played out over two days from July 16–17.

=== Performance of past champions ===
Name	Championship Year(s)	Day of Elimination
Johnny Chan	1987, 1988	2ABC
Phil Hellmuth	1989	2ABC
Jim Bechtel	1993	2ABC
Huck Seed	1996	2D
Scotty Nguyen	1998	3
Robert Varkonyi	2002	4 (852nd)*
Chris Moneymaker	2003	2ABC
Greg Raymer	2004	1B
Joe Hachem	2005	2ABC
Jamie Gold	2006	2ABC
Jerry Yang	2007	2ABC
Joe Cada	2009	2D
Greg Merson	2012	3
Ryan Riess	2013	3
Martin Jacobson	2014	3
Joe McKeehen	2015	4 (499th)*
Qui Nguyen	2016	2ABC
Scott Blumstein	2017	4 (1137th)*
Hossein Ensan	2019	3
Damian Salas	2020	2ABC
Koray Aldemir	2021	4 (598th)*
Espen Jorstad	2022	4 (1393rd)*
Daniel Weinman	2023	4 (1357th)*

*- Denotes player who finished in the money

=== Other notable high finishes ===
NB: This list is restricted to top 100 finishers with an existing Wikipedia entry.

Place	Name	Prize
13th	Kristen Foxen	$600,000
24th	Brian Rast	$350,000
39th	Brandon Cantu	$250,000
55th	Alex Keating	$160,000

=== Final Table ===
Name	Number of chips (percentage of total)	WSOP Bracelets	WSOP Cashes*	WSOP Earnings*
(United States) Jordan Griff	143,700,000 (23.7%)	0	3	$11,181
(United States) Brian Kim	94,600,000 (15.6%)	1	10	$522,048
(Sweden) Niklas Astedt	94,200,000 (15.5%)	0	58	$1,126,050
(United States) Joe Serock	83,600,000 (13.8%)	1	111	$2,044,860
(Canada) Jason Sagle	67,300,000 (11.1%)	0	25	$330,039
(Bulgaria) Boris Angelov	52,900,000 (8.7%)	0	40	$269,708
(United States) Jonathan Tamayo	26,700,000 (4.4%)	0	63	$1,069,333
(France) Malo Latinois	25,500,000 (4.2%)	0	0	0
(Spain) Andres Gonzalez	18,300,000 (3.0%)	0	31	$367,123

*Career statistics prior to the Main Event

=== Final Table results ===
Place	Name	Prize
1st	(United States) Jonathan Tamayo	$10,000,000
2nd	(United States) Jordan Griff	$6,000,000
3rd	(Sweden) Niklas Astedt	$4,000,000
4th	(Canada) Jason Sagle	$3,000,000
5th	(Bulgaria) Boris Angelov	$2,500,000
6th	(Spain) Andres Gonzalez	$2,000,000
7th	(United States) Brian Kim	$1,500,000
8th	(United States) Joe Serock	$1,250,000
9th	(France) Malo Latinois	$1,000,000

== The Poker Players Championship ==
The $50,000 Poker Players Championship began on June 23. The 7-handed final table was reached on June 26, and the final 5-handed was played on June 27.

The event attracted 89 entries, generating a prize pool of $4,249,750. The top 14 players finished in the money, with the champion earning $1,178,703.

=== Performance of past champions ===
Name	Championship Year(s)	Day of Elimination
Michael Mizrachi	2010, 2012, 2018	4 (12th)*
Brian Rast	2011, 2016, 2023	1
Matthew Ashton	2013	2
John Hennigan	2014	2
Elior Sion	2017	2
Phil Hui	2019	3 (13th)*
Daniel Cates	2021, 2022	2

*- Denotes player who finished in the money

=== Other notable high finishes ===
NB: This list is restricted to in the money finishers with an existing Wikipedia entry.

Place	Name	Prize
11th	James Obst	$113,028
12th	Michael Mizrachi	$102,299
13th	Phil Hui	$102,299

=== Final Table results ===
Hall of famer Daniel Negreanu won the tournament, earning his 7th total bracelet and his first since 2013.

Place	Name	Prize
1st	(Canada) Daniel Negreanu	$1,178,703
2nd	(United States) Bryce Yockey	$768,467
3rd	(United States) Chris Brewer	$519,158
4th	(United States) Dylan Smith	$363,914
5th	(France) David Benyamine	$265,054
6th	(United States) Jeremy Ausmus	$200,896
7th	(United States) Phil Ivey	$158,719
