= ACR Poker =

Online poker cardroom

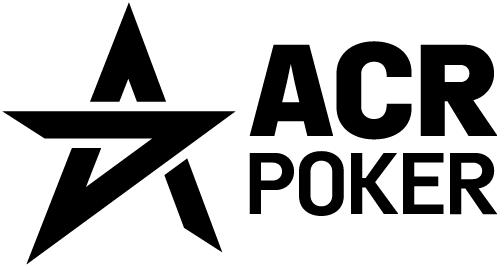
- Type: Subsidiary
- Industry: Online poker
- Founded: 2001; 25 years ago
- Headquarters: San José, Costa Rica
- Area served: Worldwide
- Parent: Winning Poker Network
- Website: acrpoker.eu

ACR Poker is a US-themed online poker site founded in 2001 and headquartered in San José, Costa Rica. The company serves parts of the United States, Canada, Latin America, and several other countries. It is a subsidiary of the Winning Poker Network.

== History ==
=== Rebranding ===
In July 2023, Americas Cardroom underwent a significant transformation, rebranding itself as ACR Poker, while simultaneously implementing substantial changes to its website and software interface.

=== Doyles Room acquisition ===
In October 2011, Americas Cardroom acquired Doyles Room, the online poker site named after Doyle Brunson, a poker professional. Brunson had recently cut ties with Doyles Room following the domain seizures of PokerStars, Absolute Poker, Full Tilt Poker, and Ultimate Bet on April 15, 2011, by the Department of Justice, in United States v. Scheinberg.

=== Coding and cryptocurrency ===
In 2017, ACR was ranked seven in the world "on the online poker traffic site PokerScout.com," according to Forbes. Phil Nagy, ACR CEO, made the company implement agile practices in their development.

In 2017, Americas Cardroom expanded its payment options to include more than 60 cryptocurrencies, responding to the growing popularity of Bitcoin around the world.

=== Delayed payments and botting ===
In 2017, concerns among players began with allegations of delayed payments involving withdrawals, including bitcoin transfers. Further allegations were made when players alleged the site required that a certain percentage of rake being taken from deposits before withdrawals could be made.

In 2018, professional poker player and podcaster Joe Ingram advised players not to use the site due to alleged botting, cheating and the possibility of superusers. In March 2018, the forums at Two Plus Two Publishing removed all advertisements relating to Americas Cardroom. In April 2019, Americas Cardroom and its parent the Winning Poker Network took "transparent action" against bots, confirming two closed accounts, the return of $200,000 to users, and the creation of a $25,000 maximum reimbursement policy after offending bot behavior. In particular, one user was banned after live video was streamed of the account acting awry.

=== New events ===
ACR has hosted events in Costa Rica, for example in 2018. On May 2, 2018, Americas Cardroom was under DDOS attack. The company as a result cancelled a number of tournaments, including one up to $1 million. According to CalvinAyre.com, the company had experienced intermittent attacks as far back as 2014, and in September 2017, the CEO of Americas Cardroom stated online that ACR would not give in to cyber terrorism or pay ransom to stop the attacks.

In November 2018, ACR launched a $1 million guaranteed poker tournament to be held on Sundays, which became permanent due to popularity. It was named The Sunday VENOM, previously called the Million Dollar Encore. Prior to Venom, it was known for Rathole events, offering prize pools over seven days. In July 2019, the company promoted that it would give the winner of the $5 million Venom tourney their $1 million payment via bitcoin in the "largest crypto payment in history for an online gaming site." During the end of 2019, ACR hosted a $12 million tournament.

== Recent Regulatory Actions ==
In November 2025, the brand's Instagram and Facebook pages were removed by Meta just months after Meta implemented sweeping new restrictions on gambling-related advertising across its platforms.
