= Robert Mizrachi =

American poker player (born 1978)

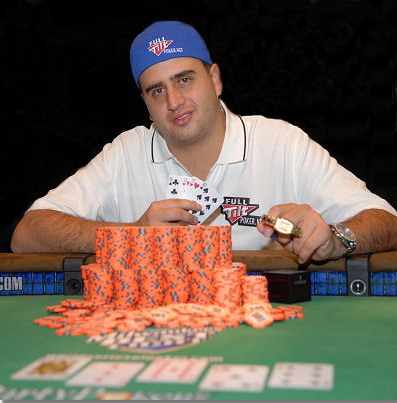
- Mizrachi after he won his first bracelet at the 2007 World Series of Poker
- Nickname: Who's Bad
- Born: November 24, 1978 (age 47)

World Series of Poker
- Bracelets: 5
- Final tables: 14
- Money finishes: 48
- Highest WSOP Main Event finish: 116th, 2010

World Poker Tour
- Title: None
- Final tables: 3
- Money finishes: 12

European Poker Tour
- Title: None
- Final table: None
- Money finishes: 2

Robert Mizrachi (born November 24, 1978, in Sunny Isles Beach, Florida) is an American professional poker player.

Robert Mizrachi was a poker dealer at a South Miami casino. He introduced the game of poker to his younger brother, World Poker Tour champion Michael "The Grinder" Mizrachi. Robert also has two other younger brothers, Michael's twin Eric Mizrachi who is also a poker player and his youngest brother Donnie Mizrachi, who is a professional magician.

Mizrachi won his first bracelet in the 2007 World Series of Poker in the $10,000 World Championship Pot Limit Omaha event, winning $768,889.

At the 2010 WSOP Main Event, Mizrachi finished in 116th place, winning $57,102. He was one of four brothers who each cashed at the same event.

At the 2014 WSOP, Mizrachi won his second bracelet in the inaugural $1,500 Dealer's Choice Six-Handed event, defeating Aaron Schaff heads-up to earn $147,092. At the 2015 WSOP, he won the $1,500 Omaha Hi-Lo 8 or Better event for his third bracelet. At the 2016 WSOP, he won his fourth bracelet in the $10,000 Seven Card Stud Championship event. At the 2024 WSOP, he won his fifth bracelet in the $10,000 Dealer's Choice event.

As of 2024, Mizrachi's live tournament winnings exceed $9,300,000.

== World Series of Poker bracelets ==
Year	Event	Prize Money
2007	$10,000 Pot Limit Omaha Championship	$768,889
2014	$1,500 Dealer's Choice Six-Handed	$147,092
2015	$1,500 Omaha Hi-Lo 8 or Better	$251,022
2016	$10,000 Seven Card Stud Championship	$242,662
2024	$10,000 Dealer's Choice Championship	$333,045
