= Scott Seiver =

American poker player (born 1985)

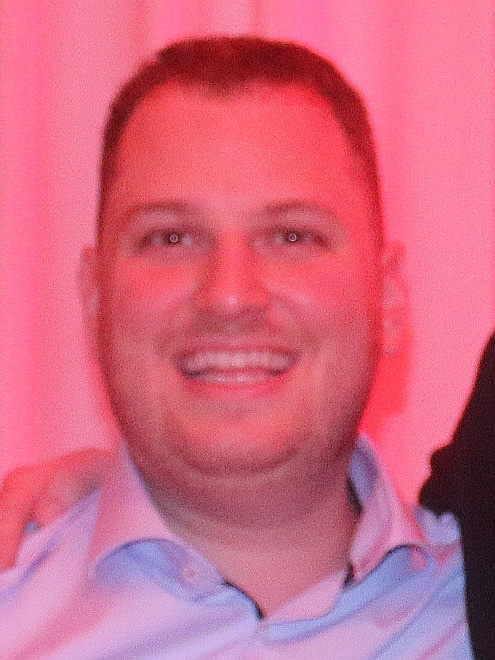
- Seiver at American Poker Awards (2015)
- Nickname: The Deipnosophist / mastrblastr / Gunning4you
- Born: April 14, 1985 (age 41); Columbus, Ohio, U.S.

World Series of Poker
- Bracelets: 7
- Money finishes: 73
- Highest WSOP Main Event finish: 77th, 2020

World Poker Tour
- Title: 1
- Final tables: 3
- Money finishes: 12

Scott Brandon Seiver (born April 14, 1985, in Columbus, Ohio) is a professional poker player from Cold Spring Harbor, New York, now residing in Las Vegas, Nevada who won the 2008 World Series of Poker $5,000 No Limit Hold'em event and is the winner of the $25,100 buy-in High Roller event at the 2010 L.A. Poker Classic. On April 29, 2015, Seiver became the 9th player in GPI history to be ranked #1.

== Poker career ==
Seiver won his first bracelet in the 2008 WSOP $5,000 No Limit Hold'em event earning $755,891.

Seiver won the $25,100 buy-in High Roller event at the 2010 L.A. Poker Classic, earning $425,330 in a final table that included runner-up Daniel Alaei, Jason Mercier (3rd), Lee Markholt (4th), Tommy Vedes (5th) and Will Molson (6th).

In 2009, Seiver finished 3rd in the PokerStars Caribbean Adventure $24,500 No Limit Hold'em – High Roller event earning $137,000 and later that year won the $5,000 No Limit Hold'em event at the 2009 Doyle Brunson Five Diamond World Poker Classic earning $218,008.

In 2010, Seiver came in 4th in the $25,000 Invitational High Roller Bounty Shootout earning along with the bounties a total of $215,000 at the 2010 Deep Stack Extravaganza, later he finished 4th at the Main Event of the 2010 PokerStars.net North American Poker Tour (NAPT) at Mohegan Sun earning $190,000.

In May 2011, Seiver won the Season IX WPT World Championship. He defeated Farzad Bonyadi heads-up, earning $1,618,344.

On January 8, 2013, Seiver won the 2013 PokerStars Caribbean Adventure Super High Roller event for $2,003,480.

On June 29, 2014, Seiver finished 6th in the $1,000,000 The Big One for One Drop at the 2014 World Series of Poker.

As of May 2015, Seiver reached #1 on the Global Poker Index Ranking.

On July 2, 2015, Seiver finished runner-up in the $500,000 Super High Roller Bowl for $5,160,000.

On May 13, 2022, Seiver was announced as Phil Hellmuth's Round 4 opponent in High Stakes Duel III. The match was for $800,000, and Hellmuth defeated Seiver on May 18, 2022.

On June 3, 2022, Seiver won his fourth WSOP bracelet in Event #3: $2,500 No-Limit Hold'em Freezeout for $320,059.

On June 4 2024, Seiver won his fifth WSOP bracelet in Event #10: $10,000 Omaha Hi-Lo 8 or Better Championship for $426,744. on June 16, he won his sixth bracelet in the $1,500 Razz event for $141,374. and on June 30th, he won his third bracelet in a month and seventh overall in event #72 $ 10,000 No Limit 2-7 lowball draw championship for $411,041. He won the 2024 WSOP Player of the Year.

As of 2026, Seiver's total live earnings exceed $27,300,000.

=== World Series of Poker bracelets ===
Year	Event	Prize Money
2008	$5,000 No Limit Hold'em	$755,891
2018	$10,000 Limit Hold'em Championship	$296,222
2019	$10,000 Razz Championship	$301,421
2022	$2,500 Freezeout No Limit Hold'em	$320,059
2024	$10,000 Omaha Hi-Lo 8 or Better Championship	$426,744
2024	$1,500 Razz	$141,374
2024	$10,000 No-Limit 2-7 Lowball Draw Championship	$411,041
