= Jonathan Tamayo =

American poker player (born 1984)

- Born: November 14, 1984 (age 42); Humble, Texas, U.S.

World Series of Poker
- Bracelet: 1
- Highest WSOP Main Event finish: Winner, 2024

World Poker Tour
- Title: None
- Final table: None

Jonathan Tamayo (born November 14, 1984) is an American professional poker player from Humble, Texas. He is best known for winning the Main Event at the 2024 World Series of Poker (WSOP), defeating a record field of 10,112 entries to claim the $10,000,000 first prize. His victory was subsequently overshadowed by controversy over on-site solver consultation by members of his rail, an incident that prompted rule changes at the following year's WSOP colloquially known as the "Tamayo Rule".

== Early life ==
Tamayo was born on November 14, 1984, and grew up in Humble, Texas, where he attended Humble High School. He later studied hotel management at Cornell University in New York, graduating from the university's School of Hotel Administration.

== Poker career ==
=== Early career (2007–2023) ===
Tamayo recorded his first WSOP cash at the 2007 World Series of Poker in a $3,000 Limit Hold'em event. He returned the following year and finished runner-up in a bracelet event at the 2008 World Series of Poker. In 2009, he finished 21st in the WSOP Main Event.

Tamayo is also a four-time WSOP Circuit ring winner, most recently in 2018.

=== 2024 WSOP Main Event ===
In the 2024 Main Event, Tamayo outlasted a record field of 10,112 entries to reach the final table. He entered heads-up play against Jordan Griff and defeated him to win his first WSOP bracelet and the $10,000,000 first prize, the largest in the event's history.

Throughout the Main Event, Tamayo was supported at the rail by 2015 Main Event champion Joe McKeehen and four-time WSOP bracelet winner Dominik Nitsche. Multiple outlets characterised McKeehen and Nitsche's assistance between hands as a "secret weapon" behind Tamayo's run.

=== Solver-consultation controversy ===
During three-handed and heads-up play at the 2024 Main Event final table, ESPN's live broadcast captured Tamayo consulting with his rail (including McKeehen and Nitsche) between hands, with Nitsche visibly working from a laptop believed to be running poker solver software. All confirmed consultations took place between hands rather than during live action; no evidence emerged of real-time in-hand assistance.

The 2024 WSOP rulebook did not explicitly prohibit between-hand coaching or the on-site presence of solver software, and Tamayo was not sanctioned. The optics of the arrangement, in which a solver-assisted rail of professionals coached a comparatively less-known player against a recreational heads-up opponent, drew significant criticism from the poker community. Commentators including Doug Polk analysed the incident at length on Upswing Poker's platforms and characterised the situation as a "grey area" in the rulebook. Daniel Negreanu publicly called on WSOP organisers to clarify rules on solver and preflop-tool use at final tables.

Tamayo publicly addressed the controversy days after his victory, defending the between-hand consultations as permitted analysis rather than in-hand assistance, and himself suggested that WSOP formalise clearer rules for future events.

Ahead of the 2025 World Series of Poker, the WSOP published revised rules restricting electronic devices and outside coaching at the final three tables of tournaments, with penalties up to disqualification for non-compliance. The changes, widely referred to in poker media as the "Tamayo Rule", were an explicit response to the 2024 Main Event controversy.

=== 2025 title defense and later career ===
Tamayo returned to defend his title at the 2025 World Series of Poker Main Event, having won his $10,000 seat through a $160 online flip satellite. He was eliminated during the second level of Day 3, ending his title defence. During the 2025 series he also recorded an 85th-place finish in the $800 Deepstack event for $3,699 and cashed at the Aria Poker Classic and Wynn Summer Classic.

As of June 2026, Tamayo's tracked live tournament earnings total approximately $12.76 million.

== Other interests ==
Tamayo is an avid daily fantasy sports player. In 2019, he won the Fantasy Hockey Championship on DraftKings.
