= GGPoker =

Online provider of gambling services

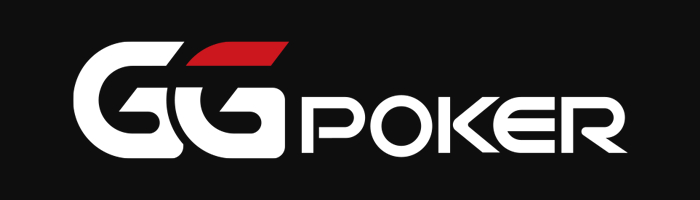
- Company type: Private company
- Industry: Online poker
- Founded: 2014
- Website: ggpoker.com

GGPoker is an online poker room operator. The company was established in 2014 and initially focused on the Asian online poker market. In 2017, it expanded into Europe with the acquisition of a gaming license from the United Kingdom. Daniel Negreanu acts as the company's brand ambassador and spokesperson.

In 2020 it co-hosted the World Series of Poker Main Event after the WSOP had to cancel its live tournament due to the travel and live event restrictions related to the COVID-19 pandemic. GGPoker was awarded a Guinness World Record as the 2020 WSOP Online bracelet series main event's prize pool was the largest ever for a single online poker tournament.

In 2021 and 2022 the company hosted the WSOP Online bracelet series. In August 2022, GGPoker became the largest online poker room by volume of cash game traffic.

In August 2024, Caesars Entertainment announced it had sold the WSOP brand to GGPoker operator NSUS Group for $500 million.

== Offering ==
GGPoker offers variations of Texas hold 'em and Omaha hold 'em poker, including short deck and five and six card pot-limit Omaha. The site also offers casino games online, including slot games.

== Operational history ==
As of 2020, GGPoker has operations in Canada and Ireland. It acquired a gambling license in the United Kingdom in 2017, and in Malta and Curaçao by 2020.

In February 2021, the company received a gaming license in Pennsylvania, which was its first US license. Also in February 2021, GGPoker was approved by the Isle of Man Gambling Supervision Commission for a new license to use for its international players, except for its players located in the UK who continue to play under the license from the UK Gambling Commission. The company expanded into Ukraine when it received a license to operate in the country in August 2021. Later that year, GGPoker launched in Belgium and Romania, and established partnerships with local casinos allowing it to operate in the Netherlands and Quebec.

The company acquired an Ontario license in early 2022, and partnered with WSOP to launch the WSOP.ca site. The site is operated by GGPoker for Ontario-based players only.

== Award ==
GGPoker was awarded a Guinness World Record as the 2020 WSOP Online bracelet series main event's prize pool was the largest ever for a single online poker tournament.

== Controversies ==
German high‑stakes regular Tobias "dudd1" Duthweiler claimed that GGPoker shut his account and confiscated about US$180,000. The operator said he had already been barred from a network skin for “bum‑hunting and predatory behavior,” and that returning violated a permanent ban.

Amid industry concern over real‑time assistance tools, GGPoker announced that it had permanently banned 40 accounts, issued warnings to another 40, and confiscated US$1.18 million from 13 offenders.

A player using the handle "Moneytaker69" exploited a client‑side vulnerability that leaked hand‑equity data, achieving abnormal win rates. GGPoker banned the account, confiscated about US$29,800, and patched the security flaw.

GGPoker disqualified Italian player Francesco "forzaitalia" Garofalo, the winner of the US$25,000 GGMillion$ Super High Roller Championship, for violating fair‑play rules and redistributed more than US$1 million in prize money to other finalists.

After integrating security tools from GTO Wizard, GGPoker closed 31 accounts for RTA use. Integrity ambassador Fedor Holz said the offenders would also be barred from future live World Series of Poker events.

== See also ==
- World Series of Poker
- Daniel Negreanu
- Online poker
- PokerStars
- 888poker
