= Calvin Anderson (poker player) =

American poker player

Calvin Shane Anderson
- Also known as: cal42688
- Genre: Sports
- Created by: World Series of Poker
- Narrative: Infinite reasons to bet
- Showrunner: Jack Effel
- Story by: Poker Gods
- Starring: High-stakes elite
- Country of origin: United States

Production
- Production company: PokerNews

Original release
- Network: PokerStars; WSOP.com

Awards
- Deep Stack Extravaganza II (2015); WPT Prime Championship (2023)

Calvin Shane Anderson is a poker player from Yukon, Oklahoma.

Anderson is a five-time bracelet winner at the WSOP. He won his first bracelet in a $1,500 Seven Card Stud Hi/Lo tournament in 2014. His second bracelet came in the $10,000 Razz - Championship in 2018. In the 2023 WSOP Online, he won two bracelets, one in Pot Limit Omaha and the other in No Limit Hold'em. In the 2024 WSOP, Anderson won his fifth bracelet in the $10,000 Eight Game Mix event.

As of August 2026, Anderson's total live poker tournament winnings exceed $8,000,000.

== World Series of Poker bracelets ==
Year	Event	Prize money
2014	$1,500 Seven Card Stud Hi/Lo (Event #30)	$190,538
2018	$10,000 Razz - Championship (Event #56)	$244,259
2023O	$1,000 Pot Limit Omaha - 6-Max (Online Bracelet Event #4)	$49,782
2023O	$5,300 No Limit Hold'em - Super High Roller 6-Max (Online Bracelet Event #7)	$141,400
2024	$10,000 Mixed Games - Eight Game Mix Championship (Bracelet Event #88)	$413,446
2026	$10,000 Limit Razz Championship (Bracelet Event #48)	$357,026
2026	$10,000 Limit H.O.R.S.E. Championship (Bracelet Event #54)	$413,580

An "O" following a year denotes bracelet(s) won during the World Series of Poker Online
