= Niklas Astedt =

Swedish poker player (born 1990)

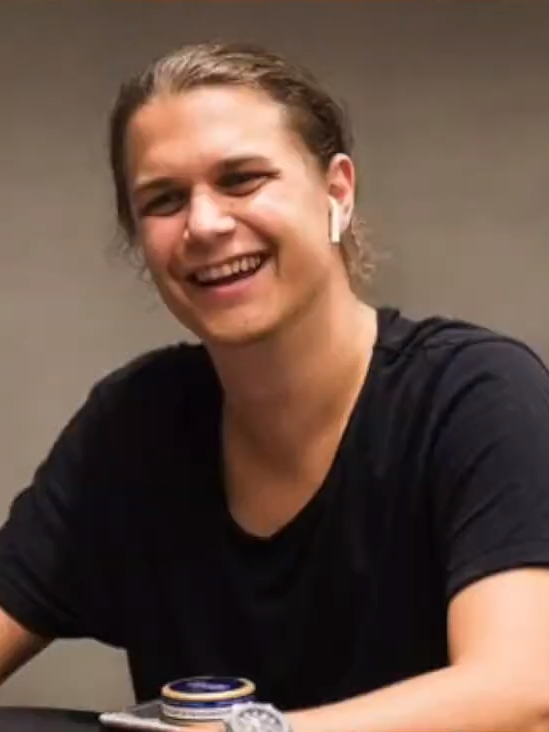
- Astedt at the 2018 EPT Barcelona
- Nickname: Lena900
- Born: 21 October 1990 (age 36); Partille, Sweden

World Series of Poker
- Bracelet: None
- Final tables: 2
- Money finishes: 18
- Highest WSOP Main Event finish: 3rd, 2024

European Poker Tour
- Money finishes: 3

Niklas Astedt (born 21 October 1990) is a Swedish professional poker player from Gothenburg, Sweden.

== Poker career ==
Astedt began playing poker in 2008. Playing under the name Lena900 on PokerStars, he has more than $48 million in career online cashes, the most all-time as of July 2024.

Astedt has won seven World Championship of Online Poker (WCOOP) and nine Spring Championship of Online Poker (SCOOP) events. His largest online cash came in April 2021, when he won the GGPoker Super Millions for $1.1 million. He has been No. 1 on the PocketFives online poker rankings for 97 weeks, the most of any player, including 33 consecutive weeks from May 2018 to January 2019. He was the PocketFives player of the year in both 2018 and 2019.

In July 2020, Astedt finished runner-up to Roberto Romanello in a $1,500 No Limit Hold'em event in the World Series of Poker Online on GGPoker.

A poll conducted by PocketFives in May 2021 named Astedt the best online poker player in history.

In live poker, Astedt has more than $7 million in career earnings. His largest cash came in the WSOP Main Event in July 2024, where he finished third for $4,000,000.

At the 2026 EPT Paris, Astedt won the €50k Super High Roller Second Chance tournament for €625,600.

=== WCOOP titles ===
| Year | Tournament | Prize (US$) |
|---|---|---|
| 2018 | $530 Pot Limit Omaha (6-Max) | $58,228 |
| 2020 | $5,200 No Limit Hold'em High Roller | $201,055 |
| 2020 | $2,100 No Limit Hold'em | $80,642 |

=== SCOOP titles ===
| Year | Tournament | Prize (US$) |
|---|---|---|
| 2017 | $109 5-Card NL Omaha 8 | $22,457 |
| 2018 | $530+R No Limit Hold'em | $102,115 |
| 2018 | $1,050 NLO8 (6-Max) | $50,392 |
| 2019 | $1,050 FLO8 (8-Max) | $27,707 |
| 2021 | $1,050 No Limit Hold'em | $85,430 |
| 2022 | $1,050 PLO8 (6-Max) | $34,456 |
