= Alec Torelli =

Italian-American poker player (born 1987)

- Nickname: traheho
- Born: March 24, 1987 (age 39); Newport Beach, California, U.S.

World Series of Poker
- Bracelet: None
- Final tables: 2
- Money finishes: 5
- Highest WSOP Main Event finish: 11th, 2023

World Poker Tour
- Final tables: 3
- Money finishes: 3

European Poker Tour
- Final table: None
- Money finishes: 3

Alec Michael Torelli (born March 24, 1987), also known by his moniker Traheho, is a professional poker player from Orange County, California, who specializes in live high stakes cash games. Torelli was formerly sponsored by Doyles Room.

== Early life and education ==
Torelli graduated from Woodbridge High School (Irvine, California) in 2005 and became an Eagle Scout at age 17. He attended Southern Methodist University (SMU) in Dallas, Texas on a scholarship but left during his freshman year to pursue professional poker.

=== Personal life ===
He is married, holds dual United States and Italian citizenship, and has visited over 50 countries. He practices daily meditation and runs “WHealthier,” a wellness investment syndicate on AngelList.

== Poker career ==
Torelli began playing poker in 2003 and made his first major final table at the 2006 Ultimate Bet Aruba Poker Classic, earning $39,730. He then moved to Melbourne, Australia, where he won the 2007 FTOPS Main Event for $288,000 and ranked 9th among Full Tilt Poker’s top winners with $1.1M in cash game profits.

After turning 21, Torelli moved to Las Vegas, where he finished second in the 2008 WSOP $10,000 Heads-Up event, winning $336,896. In 2009, he placed sixth in the WSOP $40,000 40th-anniversary event and fourth in the Bellagio Cup V, cashing $329,730 and $271,165 respectively.

In late 2008, Torelli won back-to-back events at the Bellagio WPT Fiesta al Lago, earning $84,100 and $120,715.

In 2009, Doyle Brunson selected Torelli as the first member of the "Brunson 10" pros sponsored by Doyles Room.

From 2012 to 2015, Torelli lived in Macau and played high-stakes cash games at the StarWorld and Wynn casinos. He has also been featured on partypoker Big Game, Poker Night in America, Live at the Bike, and Hustler Casino Live.

Torelli returned to the WSOP Main Event in 2023, finishing 11th and earning $700,000. and followed it up with a 3rd place finish in the 2024 WSOP Mid Stakes Championship earning $517,000.https://pokerguru.in/poker-news/2024-wsop_clementrichez-16072024/

He was an ambassador for PokerStars.it in 2013 and currently represents Phenom Poker, a decentralized poker platform.

== TV and media ==
In 2010, Torelli appeared in Entourage Season 7, the documentary A Kid’s Game: The Story of Online Poker, and on Brain Games in 2020. His 2017 interview on motivation with psychologist Bobby Hoffman was later cited in Psychology Today and included in the academic text Motivation for Learning and Performance.

== Public speaking ==
He has delivered talks at USC, Cisco, and the Women’s President’s Organization on topics like decision-making and risk-taking.

== Publications ==
In May 2020, he published The Poker Coach: Practical Strategies to Manage Your Bankroll and Outsmart Your Opponents, a book focused on poker strategy and helping others reach their poker goals.

Torelli has contributed strategy articles and commentary to several poker publications, including Bluff Magazine, PokerNews, and CardPlayer Magazine. In 2015, he launched his YouTube channel, Conscious Poker, where he breaks down poker hands and answers viewer questions.

== Controversy ==
In 2017, a hand on Poker Night in America sparked allegations of angle shooting after two $5,000 chips were concealed behind smaller denominations. Opponent Daniel Wolf misjudged Torelli’s stack and lost a pot worth $10,000 more than expected. While Torelli apologized and offered Wolf a future stake, Doug Polk publicly criticized the incident, prompting responses from Torelli and defenses by Daniel Negreanu, Brian Rast, and Charlie Carrel. Torelli responded on his YouTube channel and in an interview on the “Nick Vertucci Show”. Torelli was defended by poker professionals Daniel Negreanu, Brian Rast and Charlie Carrel, who deemed the controversy to be disproportionate and unfair.
