= John Racener =

American poker player (born 1985)

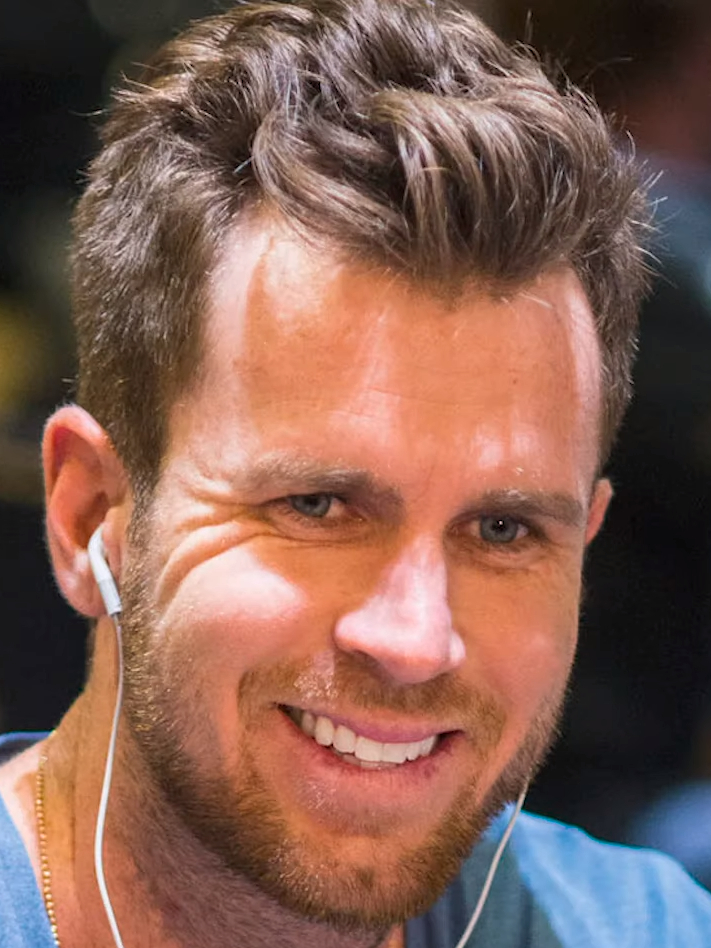
- Racener in 2019
- Nicknames: Spikey, RCNR
- Born: December 17, 1985 (age 40)

World Series of Poker
- Bracelets: 3
- Final tables: 35
- Money finishes: 138
- Highest WSOP Main Event finish: 2nd, 2010

World Poker Tour
- Title: None
- Final table: 1
- Money finishes: 18

European Poker Tour
- Title: 1
- Final tables: 3
- Money finishes: 11

John Racener (born December 17, 1985) is an American poker professional from Port Richey, Florida, best known as the runner-up of the Main Event at the 2010 World Series of Poker, which earned him $5,545,955. He has made World Series of Poker final tables on 35 occasions, as well as one World Poker Tour final table.

Racener won his first WSOP bracelet in 2017, capturing the $10,000 Dealers Choice Championship for $273,962. He also had 17 cashes in 2017 which was at the time a joint record with Chris Ferguson. Racener won his second bracelet in the $10,000 Limit Hold'em Championship at the 2024 WSOP, and this third in the $1,500 No Limit Hold'em Super Turbo Bounty at the 2025 WSOP.

As of 2025, his live tournament winnings exceed $12,900,000, $5.5 million of which comes from his second place prize at the 2010 Main Event.

== World Series of Poker bracelets ==
Year	Tournament	Prize (US$)
2017	$10,000 Dealers Choice 6-Handed Championship	$273,962
2024	$10,000 Limit Hold'em Championship (8-Handed)	$308,930
2025	$1,500 No-Limit Hold'em Super Turbo Bounty	$247,595
