= Taylor von Kriegenbergh =

American poker player (born 1988)

- Born: May 19, 1988 (age 38); Stoneham, Massachusetts, U.S.

World Series of Poker
- Money finishes: 14
- Highest WSOP Main Event finish: 23rd, 2020

World Poker Tour
- Title: 1
- Final table: 1
- Money finish: 1

Taylor von Kriegenbergh (born May 19, 1988) is an American professional poker player.

== Early life and education ==
Von Kriegenbergh was born in Stoneham, Massachusetts. A 2006 graduate of Stoneham High School, von Kriegenbergh went on to play Division II varsity baseball at the University of Massachusetts Lowell, where he earned a Bachelor of Science degree in Marketing and Management.

== Career ==
On May 3, 2011, von Kriegenbergh won his first World Poker Tour (WPT) championship at the inaugural WPT Seminole Hard Rock Showdown in Hollywood, Florida, earning $1,122,340 and his first WPT bracelet. The 2011 Hard Rock Showdown was von Kriegenbergh's first WPT tournament.
