= Triton Poker Series =

Series of poker tournaments

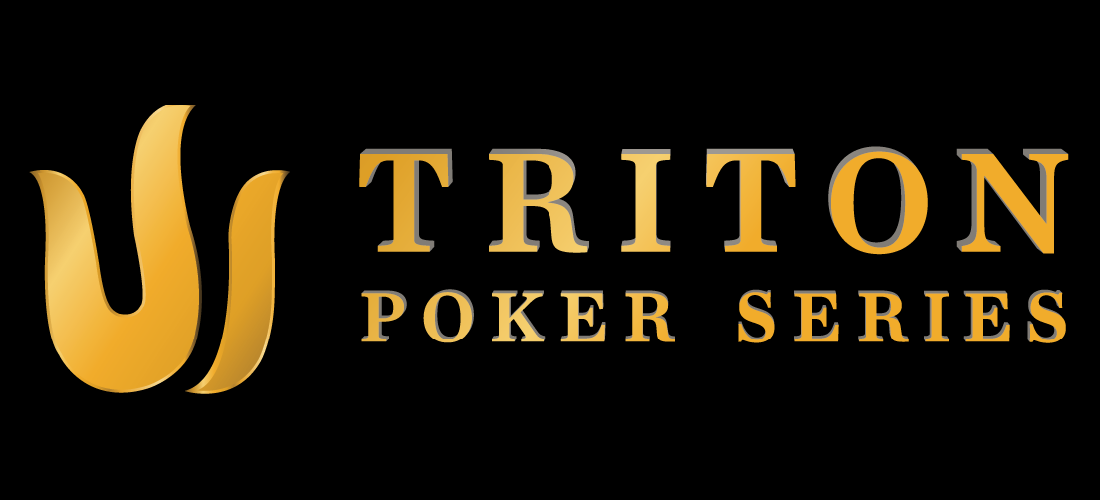
- Sport: Poker
- Founded: 2016
- CEO: (Malaysia) Andy Wong
- Director: (Italy) Luca Vivaldi
- Country: Malaysia (founded)
- Most titles: (United States) Jason Koon (12)
- Most premierships: (United States) Bryn Kenney ($51,314,802)
- Website: tritonpokerseries.com

The Triton Poker Super High Roller Series is a series of poker tournaments that are held three to four times a year at various locations around the world. Triton Poker specializes in high-stakes poker; with buy-ins of at least US$15,000 reaching up to over a million, the Triton Poker Series are among the most exclusive poker tournaments in the world.

In 2025, Triton Poker launched Triton ONE, a tour with more affordable buy-ins for players.

== History ==
Triton Poker was founded in 2016 by Paul Phua, Richard Yong, and a group of other poker enthusiasts to create a legal and exclusive space for high stakes poker players following runs-in with the law encountered by Phua and Yong. They were later joined in 2018 while it was still in its experimental phase by Andy Wong who became its CEO. It became a regular poker tour in 2019 with multiple tournaments at every stop of the tour. The most commonly played variants in tournaments are No-Limit Hold'em and Short Deck. Occasionally, Pot-Limit Omaha tournaments are also included in the tournament schedule. Since 2019, each tournament series has featured a Main Event in both No-Limit Hold'em and Short Deck at every stop.

The first Triton Poker Series was held in January 2016 in Parañaque, Philippines with a $200,000 NLH buy-in event won by Fedor Holz. Events continued to be held in Manila until Macau and Montenegro were added in 2017, and four more tournaments were held in Montenegro in May 2018. There, further events in the South Korean Jeju Province were announced for the end of July 2018. The first events of 2019 were also played in Jeju-do in March. At the second event in 2019 the variant Pot-Limit Omaha was played for the first time at Triton Poker Series.

At the beginning of August 2019 the Triton Million for Charity took place in London which was the most expensive poker tournament to date with a buy-in of one million Pound sterling. The tournament series planned for February 2020 in Jeju-do was postponed due to the COVID-19 pandemic. The planned holding in Montenegro in May 2020 was also canceled at the end of March 2020. The return of the tournament series in Bali announced for February 2022 also had to be postponed due to COVID-19 pandemic as well as four tournaments in Sochi due to the Russian invasion of Ukraine. Ultimately the first tournament after the outbreak of the COVID-19 pandemic took place in April 2022 in Northern Cyprus, known as the Triton Poker Cyprus – Special Edition and lasted for six days from April 2 to 7, 2022.

After the success in Northern Cyprus, Triton Poker continued to strengthen its popularity in Europe with Triton High Roller Series Madrid in May 2022, and returned to Northern Cyprus in September the same year. The second Triton Super High Roller Series Cyprus included the special $200,000 Coin Rivet Invitational, and was slated to last from September 5 to 19, 2022 when one of Triton Poker's co-founders, Ivan Leow, died of a heart attack on September 17, 2022. The tournament was immediately cancelled upon his death to allow family, friends, and the poker community who was present to pay tribute to his memories.

The Triton Poker tournaments are broadcast via their YouTube channel and the live streaming platform Twitch featuring commentators with poker background including Lex Veldhuis and Randy Lew.

In July 2025, Triton Poker Series launch TRITON ONE with more affordable buy-ins for poker players. Triton described it as a new tour for all aspiring poker superstars. The Triton One series was launch early September 2025 before the Triton High Roller Series Jeju (Soutr Korea).

Between 2016 and 2026, the series staged over 300 events awarding approximately US$1.88 billion in prize money and drew roughly 2,000 distinct players from 87 countries; across this span the average field grew from 47 to 173 entrants while the average buy-in fell from about $93,000 to $27,000.

== Invitational tournaments ==
=== Triton Million for Charity ===
The Triton Million for Charity was the first ever invitational tournament hosted by Triton Poker and was held from August 1 to 3, 2019 at London Hilton on Park Lane in London. With a total of 54 participants and a buy-in of £1,050,000, the Triton Million for Charity was the most expensive poker tournament to date. £50,000 was collected from each buy-in, which amounted to a massive £2,750,000, and distributed to 15 notable charity bodies around the world including the One Drop Foundation, Raising for Effective Giving (REG), and Malaysian Red Crescent. The prestigious tournament was on a strict invitation-only basis, attended by star-studded names in both the business and poker and fields, and commentated by poker legend Daniel Negreanu and television personality Ali Nejad. The 54 players generated a total prize pool of £54,000,000.

In the first six blind levels, each lasting an hour, the recreational and professional players were placed at separate tables. Ten blind levels were played on the first day of the tournament. As the tournament progressed, 36 of the 54 players were still in the competition with Bill Perkins as the chip leader. On the second day of the Triton Million for Charity, the prize money ranks were reached with the elimination of Igor Kurganov. The day ended with the eight-handed final table and Vivek Rajkumar leading the field. On the final day of the tournament, Bryn Kenney and Aaron Zang reached the final heads-up and agreed to an ICM deal, giving Zang a payout of £13,779,491 and Kenney £16,890,509, the largest payout in poker tournament history. Shortly after, Zang regained the lead after two big pots and won the title.

Results
Place	Name	Prize
1st	(China) Aaron Zang	£13,779,491
2nd	(United States) Bryn Kenney	£16,890,509
3rd	(United States) Dan Smith	£7,200,000
4th	(United Kingdom) Stephen Chidwick	£4,410,000
5th	(India) Vivek Rajkumar	£3,000,000
6th	(United States) Bill Perkins	£2,200,000
7th	(United States) Alfred DeCarolis	£1,720,000
8th	(Canada) Timothy Adams	£1,400,000
9th	(Malaysia) Wai Leong Chan	£1,200,000
10th	(Malaysia) Chin Wei Lim	£1,100,000
11th	(Hong Kong) Winfred Yu	£1,100,000

=== Coin Rivet Invitational ===
The Coin Rivet Invitational was the second invitational tournament in the Triton Super High Roller Series. It was held from September 10 to 12, 2022 at the Merit Royal Hotel & Casino in Northern Cyprus. The inaugural tournament had a buy-in of $200,000, making it one of the most expensive poker tournaments in 2022. Not unlike the Triton Million for Charity, the Coin Rivet Invitational was by invitation-only, pitting world class poker professionals against high-rolling VIPs from various business backgrounds in the fight to win the biggest chunk from the massive prize pool of $23,000,000. The elite tournament had a total of 90 participations, which included 45 top players such as Phil Ivey and Jason Koon who were paired against 45 VIP recreationals including Paul Phua and Tony G. The players were split into two camps on the first day and later merged into one on the second day, which remained until the end of the tournament. One of the highlights of the tournament was the participation of the American professional poker player Ebony Kenney, who was invited by Phil Nagy. Kenney made history by being the first woman to participate as a professional in a major invitational tournament of this scale, and finished in fifth place, taking home $1,700,000. Two other women who attended the tournament were businesswomen Sosia Jiang and Melika Razavi.

During the tournament, every player was allowed a single re-buy after being eliminated in one of the first 10 blind levels. On the first day of the tournament, 80 players were still in the event with Leon Tsoukernik as the chip leader. On the second day of the tournament, where the recreational and professional players were mixed for the first time, 16 players remained with Fedor Holz leading the field. The final table was reached on the third day with Karl Chappe-Gatien starting as the chip leader. After his elimination in third place, Sam Grafton went heads-up against Linus Loeliger with a clear lead and won the tournament. The British professional poker player received a payout of $5,500,000 for his win, along with the much coveted trophy.

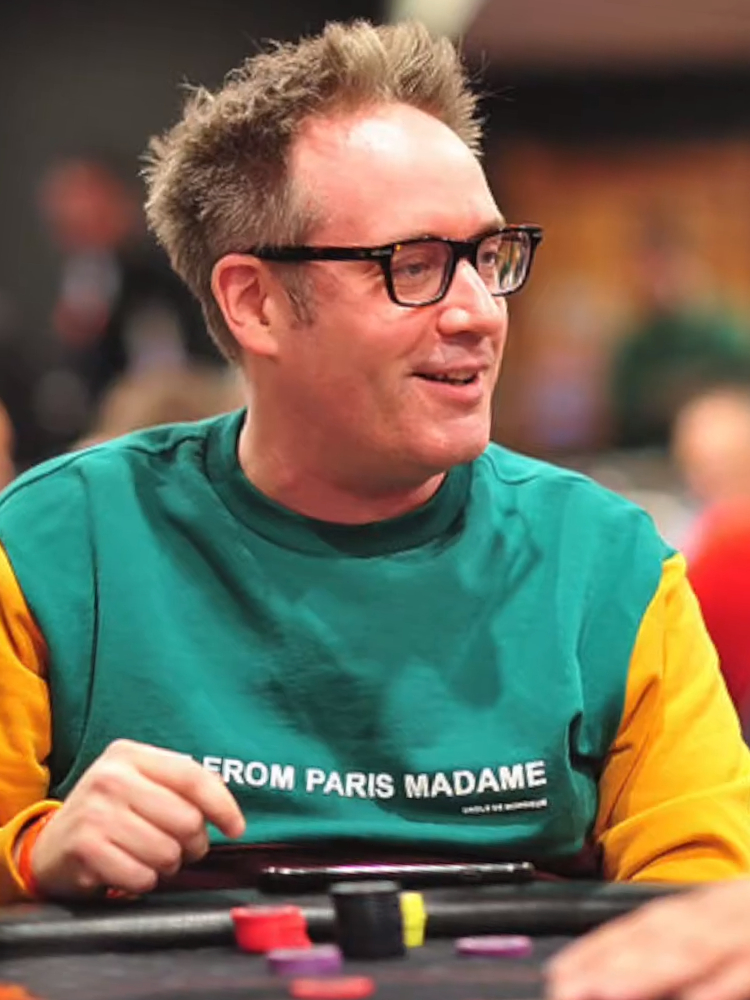
Sam Grafton

Results
Place	Name	Prize
1st	(United Kingdom) Sam Grafton	$5,500,000
2nd	(Switzerland) Linus Loeliger	$3,900,000
3rd	(France) Karl Chappe-Gatien	$2,600,000
4th	(Germany) Fedor Holz	$2,100,000
5th	(United States) Ebony Kenney	$1,700,000
6th	(Latvia) Aleksejs Ponakovs	$1,350,000
7th	(Finland) Elias Talvitie	$1,050,000
8th	(United States) Seth Davies	$770,000
9th	(Netherlands) Tom Vogelsang	$620,000
10th	(Lithuania) Tony G	$485,000
11th	(Belarus) Vadzim Godzdanker	$485,000
12th	(United States) Daniel Cates	$440,000
13th	(Denmark) Theis Hennebjerre	$440,000
14th	(Hong Kong) Horace Wei	$400,000
15th	(Czech Republic) Leon Tsoukernik	$400,000
16th	(United Kingdom) David Nicholson	$380,000
17th	(United States) Eric Worre	$380,000

== List of events ==
=== Triton Super High Roller Series ===
Start date	Location	Tournament	Buy-in (original)	Entrants	Prize Pool (U$D)	Winner	Winner Prize (U$D)	Source
January 3, 2016	(Philippines) Parañaque	NLH Cali Cup	$200,000	52	$10,039,120	(Germany) Fedor Holz	$3,072,748	
September 9, 2016	(Philippines) Manila	NLH Charity	HK$490,000	35	$2,186,499	(Malaysia) Wai Kin Yong	$793,604	
November 2, 2016	(Philippines) Parañaque	NLH Suncity Cup	HK$200,000	39	$970,882	(United States) Daniel Cates	$359,229	
November 4, 2016	(Philippines) Parañaque	NLH Main Event	HK$500,000	101	$6,285,640	(Malaysia) Wai Kin Yong	$2,080,556	
February 17, 2017	(Philippines) Parañaque	NLH 6-Max	HK$250,000	43	$1,303,208	(United States) Dan Colman	$469,246	
February 19, 2017	(Philippines) Parañaque	NLH Main Event	HK$1,000,000	39	$4,814,720	(Germany) Koray Aldemir	$1,292,509	
July 16, 2017	Montenegro	NLH 6-Max	HK$250,000	41	$1,235,582	(Germany) Fedor Holz	$444,893	
July 18, 2017	Montenegro	NLH Main Event	HK$1,000,000	52	$6,268,665	(Germany) Manig Loeser	$2,162,644	
October 16, 2017	Macau	NLH 6-Max	HK$250,000	87	$2,621,009	(Germany) Stefan Schillhabel	$752,446	
October 18, 2017	Macau	NLH Main Event	HK$1,000,000	83	$10,000,499	(United States) John Juanda	$2,870,092	
May 12, 2018	Montenegro	NLH Short Deck Ante-Only	HK$250,000	61	$1,827,664	(United States) Phil Ivey	$604,992	
May 13, 2018	Montenegro	NLH 6-Max	HK$250,000	35	$1,048,660	(Malaysia) Richard Yong	$388,024	
May 15, 2018	Montenegro	NLH Main Event	HK$1,000,000	63	$7,550,446	(Belarus) Mikita Badziakouski	$2,499,184	
May 17, 2018	Montenegro	NLH Short Deck Ante-Only	HK$1,000,000	103	$12,344,129	(United States) Jason Koon	$3,579,836	
July 23, 2018	(South Korea) Jeju	NLH Short Deck Ante-Only	HK$100,000	61	$777,070	(United States) Nick Schulman	$271,975	
July 25, 2018	(South Korea) Jeju	NLH Short Deck Ante-Only	HK$500,000	44	$2,803,551	(Malaysia) Ivan Leow	$1,079,367	
July 26, 2018	(South Korea) Jeju	NLH 6-Max	HK$500,000	39	$2,485,520	(United States) David Peters	$1,118,484	
July 28, 2018	(South Korea) Jeju	NLH Short Deck Ante-Only	HK$1,000,000	60	$7,645,357	(Singapore) Kenneth Kee Kiang	$2,867,009	
July 30, 2018	(South Korea) Jeju	NLH Main Event	HK$2,000,000	55	$14,018,739	(Belarus) Mikita Badziakouski	$5,257,027	
August 7, 2018	(Russia) Sochi	NLH High Roller	₽3,000,000	47	$2,130,184	(Scotland) Aymon Hata	$755,384	
August 8, 2018	(Russia) Sochi	NLH Super High Roller	₽6,000,000	29	$2,629,847	(Malaysia) Seng Leow	$1,133,555	
March 2, 2019	(South Korea) Jeju	NLH Short Deck Ante-Only	HK$250,000	65	$1,946,281	(United States) Justin Bonomo	$586,114	
March 3, 2019	(South Korea) Jeju	NLH Short Deck Ante-Only	HK$500,000	69	$4,132,105	(China) Devan Tang	$1,239,758	
March 4, 2019	(South Korea) Jeju	NLH 6-Max	HK$500,000	81	$4,850,361	(Malaysia) Michael Soyza	$1,420,581	
March 5, 2019	(South Korea) Jeju	NLH Short Deck Ante-Only	HK$1,000,000	81	$9,699,981	(United States) Jason Koon	$2,840,945	
March 7, 2019	(South Korea) Jeju	NLH Main Event	HK$2,000,000	48	$11,491,541	(Canada) Timothy Adams	$3,536,550	
March 8, 2019	(South Korea) Jeju	NLH Triton Refresh	HK$1,000,000	25	$2,993,745	(United States) Jason Koon	$973,306	
March 9, 2019	(South Korea) Jeju	NLH Short Deck Ante-Only	HK$1,000,000	37	$4,430,805	(Russia) Timofey Kuznetsov	$1,724,185	
May 5, 2019	Montenegro	NLH 8-Handed Turbo	HK$250,000	45	$1,348,078	(United States) Steve O'Dwyer	$472,788	
May 6, 2019	Montenegro	NLH 6-Max	HK$500,000	79	$4,732,589	(United States) Bryn Kenney	$1,431,376	
May 7, 2019	Montenegro	NLH Short Deck Ante-Only	HK$100,000	70	$838,473	(Hong Kong) Winfred Yu	$259,952	
May 8, 2019	Montenegro	NLH Main Event	HK$1,000,000	75	$8,982,494	(United States) Bryn Kenney	$2,713,859	
May 9, 2019	Montenegro	NLH Turbo	HK$250,000	37	$1,143,270	(Denmark) Henrik Hecklen	$434,500	
May 10, 2019	Montenegro	NLH Short Deck Ante-Only Main Event	HK$1,000,000	98	$11,737,873	(France) Rui Cao	$3,351,130	
May 12, 2019	Montenegro	Pot-Limit Omaha	HK$200,000	37	$886,318	(Malaysia) Hing Yang Chow	$336,383	
May 13, 2019	Montenegro	NLH Short Deck Ante-Only Turbo	HK$200,000	64	$1,532,993	(Singapore) Quek Sechariah Sheng	$471,416	
May 14, 2019	Montenegro	NLH Short Deck Ante-Only	HK$250,000	65	$1,946,133	(United States) John Juanda	$601,358	
May 15, 2019	Montenegro	NLH Short Deck Ante-Only	HK$750,000	52	$4,856,741	(Belarus) Mikita Badziakouski	$1,694,397	
May 16, 2019	Montenegro	NLH Short Deck Ante-Only	HK$500,000	42	$2,558,255	(United States) Ben Lamb	$974,634	
May 17, 2019	Montenegro	NLH / Short Deck Mix	HK$300,000	27	$1,000,981	(United States) Daniel Cates	$500,682	
July 31, 2019	(United Kingdom) London	NLH 6-Max Turbo	£25,000	117	$3,561,037	(Switzerland) Linus Loeliger	$840,039	
August 1, 2019	(United Kingdom) London	NLH Triton Million for Charity	£1,050,000	54	$65,742,217	(China) Aaron Zang	$16,775,820	
August 2, 2019	(United Kingdom) London	NLH 8-Handed	£50,000	109	$6,212,182	(England) Charlie Carrel	$1,601,853	
August 4, 2019	(United Kingdom) London	NLH Main Event	£100,000	130	$14,871,608	(Malaysia) Wai Kin Yong	$3,154,064	
August 5, 2019	(United Kingdom) London	NLH Short Deck Ante-Only	£25,000	106	$3,058,596	(United States) David Benefield	$789,707	
August 6, 2019	(United Kingdom) London	NLH Short Deck Ante-Only Main Event	£100,000	108	$12,617,721	(United States) Justin Bonomo	$3,248,728	
August 7, 2019	(United Kingdom) London	NLH Short Deck Ante-Only	£50,000	52	$2,999,294	(China) Yu Liang	$945,416	
August 9, 2019	(United Kingdom) London	NLH Short Deck Ante-Only Les Ambassadeurs Private Event	£100,000	67	$7,811,285	(China) Xuan Tan	$2,285,430	
August 10, 2019	(United Kingdom) London	NLH Short Deck Ante-Only Les Ambassadeurs Private Event	£250,000	73	$21,168,355	(United States) John Patgorski	$5,821,826	
August 12, 2019	(Czech Republic) Rozvadov	NLH Super High Roller	€100,000	32	$3,406,582	(Turkey) Örpen Kısacıkoğlu	$1,015,180	
August 13, 2019	(Czech Republic) Rozvadov	NLH Short Deck Ante-Only	€25,500	27	$718,576	(Lithuania) Tony G	$265,859	
April 2, 2022	(Northern Cyprus) Kyrenia	NLH	$50,000	82	$3,936,000	(Hungary) András Németh	$1,082,000	
April 3, 2022	(Northern Cyprus) Kyrenia	NLH	$100,000	69	$6,624,000	(Netherlands) Teun Mulder	$1,940,000	
April 4, 2022	(Northern Cyprus) Kyrenia	NLH 8-Handed Turbo	$50,000	32	$1,988,500	(Austria) Matthias Eibinger	$676,000	
April 5, 2022	(Northern Cyprus) Kyrenia	NLH Short Deck Ante-Only	$75,000	51	$3,706,500	(United States) Phil Ivey	$1,170,000	
April 6, 2022	(Northern Cyprus) Kyrenia	NLH Short Deck Ante-Only	$75,000	41	$2,976,000	(Hong Kong) Winfred Yu	$1,010,000	
May 13, 2022	(Spain) Madrid	NLH 8-Handed	€20,000	90	$1,871,257	(Australia) Michael Addamo	$496,923	
May 14, 2022	(Spain) Madrid	NLH 7-Handed	€30,000	93	$1,871,257	(Malaysia) Paul Phua	$769,711	
May 15, 2022	(Spain) Madrid	NLH Short Deck Ante-Only	€20,000	62	$1,290,699	(United States) Chris Brewer	$387,209	
May 16, 2022	(Spain) Madrid	NLH Short Deck Ante-Only	€25,000	68	$1,771,221	(France) Rui Cao	$517,821	
May 17, 2022	(Spain) Madrid	NLH 7-Handed	€50,000	101	$5,304,455	(Belarus) Mikita Badziakouski	$1,407,519	
May 18, 2022	(Spain) Madrid	NLH 8-Handed	€75,000	63	$4,965,478	(Australia) Michael Addamo	$1,210,721	
May 19, 2022	(Spain) Madrid	NLH Short Deck Ante-Only	€50,000	57	$4,965,478	(Malaysia) Chin Wei Lim	$900,958	
May 20, 2022	(Spain) Madrid	NLH Main Event	€100,000	93	$9,827,750	(Denmark) Henrik Hecklen	$2,293,679	
May 21, 2022	(Spain) Madrid	NLH Turbo	€50,000	37	$1,953,744	(Hungary) László Bujtás	$665,329	
May 22, 2022	(Spain) Madrid	Pot-Limit Omaha	€25,000	34	$897,751	(United States) Tom Dwan	$306,291	
May 23, 2022	(Spain) Madrid	NLH Short Deck Ante-Only Main Event	€100,000	60	$6,388,212	(England) Stephen Chidwick	$1,916,463	
May 24, 2022	(Spain) Madrid	NLH Short Deck Ante-Only	€150,000	34	$5,429,980	(United States) Jason Koon	$1,863,228	
May 25, 2022	(Spain) Madrid	NLH Short Deck Ante-Only Turbo	€30,000	33	$1,060,298	(United States) Tom Dwan	$359,859	
September 5, 2022	(Northern Cyprus) Kyrenia	NLH 8-Handed	$25,000	131	$3,275,000	(Finland) Patrik Antonius	$825,000	
September 6, 2022	(Northern Cyprus) Kyrenia	NLH 6-Max	$30,000	123	$3,690,000	(United States) Benjamin Tollerene	$807,927	
September 7, 2022	(Northern Cyprus) Kyrenia	NLH 6-Max	$50,000	117	$5,850,000	(Belgium) Pieter Aerts	$1,472,000	
September 8, 2022	(Northern Cyprus) Kyrenia	NLH 8-Handed	$75,000	88	$6,600,000	(Australia) Kahle Burns	$1,730,000	
September 10, 2022	(Northern Cyprus) Kyrenia	NLH Coin Rivet Invitational	$210,000	115	$23,000,000	(England) Sam Grafton	$5,500,000	
September 11, 2022	(Northern Cyprus) Kyrenia	Pot-Limit Omaha	$25,000	32	$800,000	(Cyprus) Christopher Philippou	$270,000	
September 12, 2022	(Northern Cyprus) Kyrenia	NLH Main Event	$100,000	99	$9,900,000	(Thailand) Punnat Punsri	$2,600,000	
September 13, 2022	(Northern Cyprus) Kyrenia	NLH Turbo	$50,000	32	$1,600,000	(Austria) Matthias Eibinger	$545,000	
September 14, 2022	(Northern Cyprus) Kyrenia	NLH Short Deck Ante-Only	$30,000	38	$1,140,000	(United States) Phil Ivey	$387,000	
September 15, 2022	(Northern Cyprus) Kyrenia	NLH Short Deck Ante-Only Single Bullet	$40,000	45	$1,800,000	(France) Karl Chappe-Gatien	$565,000	
September 16, 2022	(Northern Cyprus) Kyrenia	NLH Short Deck Ante-Only	$50,000	30	$1,500,000	(Canada) Sam Greenwood	$341,275	
March 1, 2023	(Vietnam) Hội An	NLH GG Super Million$ Live	$25,000	166	$4,150,000	(Malaysia) Chin Wei Lim	$965,000	
March 2, 2023	(Vietnam) Hội An	NLH 7-Handed	$15,000	172	$2,580,000	(Argentina) José Ignacio Barbero	$600,000	
March 3, 2023	(Vietnam) Hội An	NLH Mystery Bounty	$20,000	179	$1,790,000	(England) Mark Rubbathan	$396,000	
March 4, 2023	(Vietnam) Hội An	NLH 7-Handed	$30,000	171	$5,130,000	(Netherlands) Jans Arends	$921,178	
March 5, 2023	(Vietnam) Hội An	NLH 8-Handed	$50,000	139	$6,950,000	(Vietnam) Minh Phu Dao	$1,670,000	
March 6, 2023	(Vietnam) Hội An	NLH 8-Handed	$75,000	85	$6,375,000	(Turkey) Örpen Kısacıkoğlu	$1,753,000	
March 7, 2023	(Vietnam) Hội An	NLH Turbo	$25,000	104	$2,600,000	(Scotland) Andrew Leathem	$670,000	
March 8, 2023	(Vietnam) Hội An	NLH Main Event	$100,000	135	$13,500,000	(England) Talal Shakerchi	$3,250,000	
March 9, 2023	(Vietnam) Hội An	NLH Turbo	$50,000	31	$1,550,000	(United States) Jason Koon	$574,000	
March 10, 2023	(Vietnam) Hội An	NLH Short Deck Ante-Only	$25,000	57	$1,425,000	(Hong Kong) Danny Tang	$427,000	
March 11, 2023	(Vietnam) Hội An	NLH Short Deck Ante-Only	$50,000	44	$2,200,000	(Canada) Mike Watson	$695,000	
March 12, 2023	(Vietnam) Hội An	NLH Short Deck Ante-Only Main Event	$100,000	49	$4,900,000	(China) Aaron Zang	$1,544,000	
March 13, 2023	(Vietnam) Hội An	NLH Short Deck Ante-Only	$20,000	28	$560,000	(Canada) Sam Greenwood	$207,000	
May 10, 2023	(Northern Cyprus) Kyrenia	NLH GG Super Million$ Live	$25,000	158	$3,950,000	(India) Santhosh Suvarna	$700,000	
May 11, 2023	(Northern Cyprus) Kyrenia	NLH 7-Handed	$20,000	138	$2,760,000	(United States) Jason Koon	$663,000	
May 12, 2023	(Northern Cyprus) Kyrenia	NLH 6-Max Mystery Bounty	$30,000	155	$2,325,000	(China) Biao Ding	$540,500	
May 13, 2023	(Northern Cyprus) Kyrenia	NLH 8-Handed	$40,000	125	$5,000,000	(France) Grégoire Auzoux	$1,050,024	
May 14, 2023	(Northern Cyprus) Kyrenia	NLH 7-Handed	$50,000	104	$5,200,000	(Russia) Viacheslav Buldygin	$1,342,000	
May 15, 2023	(Northern Cyprus) Kyrenia	NLH Turbo	$25,000	83	$2,075,000	(Russia) Anatoliy Zlotnikov	$496,100	
May 16, 2023	(Northern Cyprus) Kyrenia	NLH 8-Handed	$75,000	87	$6,525,000	(Malaysia) Michael Soyza	$1,735,000	
May 18, 2023	(Northern Cyprus) Kyrenia	NLH Luxon Invitational	$200,000	86	$17,200,000	(Azerbaijan) Ramin Hajiyev	$4,122,554	
May 19, 2023	(Northern Cyprus) Kyrenia	PLO	$25,000	37	$925,000	(United States) Chris Brewer	$315,000	
May 20, 2023	(Northern Cyprus) Kyrenia	NLH Main Event	$100,000	101	$10,100,000	(United States) Jason Koon	$2,451,082	
May 21, 2023	(Northern Cyprus) Kyrenia	NLH Turbo	$50,000	32	$1,600,000	(Hong Kong) Danny Tang	$545,000	
May 22, 2023	(Northern Cyprus) Kyrenia	PLO	$30,000	34	$1,020,000	(Canada) Mike Watson	$347,000	
May 23, 2023	(Northern Cyprus) Kyrenia	NLH Short Deck Ante-Only	$25,000	38	$950,000	(Malaysia) Richard Yong	$323,000	
May 24, 2023	(Northern Cyprus) Kyrenia	NLH Short Deck Ante-Only Main Event	$50,000	44	$2,200,000	(Hong Kong) Danny Tang	$750,000	
May 25, 2023	(Northern Cyprus) Kyrenia	NLH Short Deck Ante-Only	$20,000	29	$580,000	(Canada) Daniel Dvoress	$214,000	
July 27, 2023	(United Kingdom) London	NLH GGMillion$ Live	$25,000	162	$4,050,000	(Canada) Lucas Greenwood	$897,000	
July 28, 2023	(United Kingdom) London	NLH 7-Handed	$25,000	120	$3,000,000	(Germany) Fedor Holz	$609,853	
July 29, 2023	(United Kingdom) London	NLH 7-Handed Mystery Bounty	$40,000	133	$2,660,000	(Norway) Espen Jørstad	$639,000	
July 30, 2023	(United Kingdom) London	NLH 8-Handed	$50,000	112	$5,600,000	(Germany) Ole Schemion	$1,350,000	
July 31, 2023	(United Kingdom) London	NLH 7-Handed	$60,000	104	$6,240,000	(United States) Jason Koon	$1,570,000	
August 1, 2023	(United Kingdom) London	NLH 8-Handed	$200,000	81	$16,200,000	(New Zealand) David Yan	$3,052,002	
August 2, 2023	(United Kingdom) London	NLH Turbo Bounty	$30,000	96	$1,920,000	(Brazil) Pedro Garagnani	$459,000	
August 3, 2023	(United Kingdom) London	NLH Luxon Invitational	$250,000	118	$29,500,000	(United States) Bryn Kenney	$6,860,000	
August 4, 2023	(United Kingdom) London	PLO	$25,000	77	$1,925,000	(United States) Seth Gottlieb	$511,000	
August 5, 2023	(United Kingdom) London	NLH Main Event	$125,000	151	$18,875,000	(Canada) Timothy Adams	$4,185,000	
August 6, 2023	(United Kingdom) London	NLH Turbo	$60,000	61	$3,660,000	(United States) Phil Ivey	$1,007,000	
August 7, 2023	(United Kingdom) London	NLH 8-Handed	$60,000	106	$6,360,000	(Hong Kong) Danny Tang	$1,600,000	
August 8, 2023	(United Kingdom) London	NLH Short Deck Ante-Only	$30,000	37	$1,110,000	(Malaysia) Wai Kin Yong	$350,000	
August 9, 2023	(United Kingdom) London	NLH Short Deck Ante-Only Main Event	$60,000	46	$2,760,000	(United States) Jason Koon	$828,000	
August 10, 2023	(United Kingdom) London	NLH Short Deck Ante-Only	$25,000	33	$825,000	(United States) Phil Ivey	$280,500	
October 24, 2023	(Monaco) Monte-Carlo	NLH The Special Triton Invitational	$200,000	73	$14,600,000	(United States) Dan Smith	$3,870,000	
October 25, 2023	(Monaco) Monte-Carlo	NLH Bounty Turbo	$50,000	57	$1,710,000	(United States) Jonathan Jaffe	$501,000	
October 26, 2023	(Monaco) Monte-Carlo	NLH Main Event	$125,000	135	$16,875,000	(Austria) Matthias Eibinger	$3,461,261	
October 27, 2023	(Monaco) Monte-Carlo	NLH 8-Handed Turbo	$25,000	57	$1,425,000	(United States) Steve O'Dwyer	$416,000	
October 28, 2023	(Monaco) Monte-Carlo	NLH 8-Handed	$100,000	120	$12,000,000	(Germany) Christoph Vogelsang	$2,644,000	
October 29, 2023	(Monaco) Monte-Carlo	NLH 7-Handed	$30,000	145	$4,350,000	(Bulgaria) Ognyan Dimov	$1,010,000	
October 30, 2023	(Monaco) Monte-Carlo	NLH Mystery Bounty	$40,000	162	$6,480,000	(Austria) Mario Mosböck	$718,000	
October 31, 2023	(Monaco) Monte-Carlo	NLH 8-Handed	$50,000	136	$6,800,000	(Hong Kong) Danny Tang	$1,580,000	
November 1, 2023	(Monaco) Monte-Carlo	NLH GGMillion$ Live	$25,000	187	$4,675,000	(Malaysia) Chin Wei Lim	$899,893	
November 2, 2023	(Monaco) Monte-Carlo	PLO Bounty	$30,000	74	$1,460,000	(England) Gavin Andreanoff	$387,000	
November 3, 2023	(Monaco) Monte-Carlo	PLO	$50,000	72	$3,600,000	(Canada) Daniel Dvoress	$956,000	
November 4, 2023	(Monaco) Monte-Carlo	PLO Turbo	$25,000	50	$1,250,000	(United States) Jason Koon	$365,000	
March 5, 2024	(South Korea) Jeju	NLH 8-Handed	$15,000	269	$4,035,000	(Germany) Fedor Holz	$786,000	
March 6, 2024	(South Korea) Jeju	NLH 8-Handed	$20,000	225	$4,500,000	(Austria) Roland Rokita	$904,000	
March 7, 2024	(South Korea) Jeju	NLH Silver Main	$25,000	298	$7,450,000	(Lithuania) Paulius Vaitiekunas	$1,077,499	
March 8, 2024	(South Korea) Jeju	NLH 8-Handed	$30,000	185	$5,550,000	(Spain) Adrián Mateos	$1,175,000	
March 9, 2024	(South Korea) Jeju	NLH GGMillion$ Live	$25,000	305	$7,625,000	(Austria) Mario Mosböck	$1,191,196	
March 10, 2024	(South Korea) Jeju	NLH 7-Handed Mystery Bounty	$40,000	190	$3,800,000	(Bulgaria) Dimitar Danchev	$804,000	
March 11, 2024	(South Korea) Jeju	NLH 8-Handed	$50,000	190	$9,500,000	(Thailand) Punnat Punsri	$2,010,000	
March 12, 2024	(South Korea) Jeju	NLH 8-Handed	$150,000	117	$17,550,000	(Hong Kong) Elton Tsang	$4,210,000	
March 13, 2024	(South Korea) Jeju	NLH Turbo Bounty Quattro	$50,000	108	$3,780,000	(United States) Dan Smith	$901,000	
March 14, 2024	(South Korea) Jeju	NLH Main Event	$100,000	216	$21,600,000	(Czech Republic) Roman Hrabec	$4,330,000	
March 15, 2024	(South Korea) Jeju	PLO 6-Max	$25,000	80	$2,000,000	(China) Quan Zhou	$956,000	
March 16, 2024	(South Korea) Jeju	PLO 6-Max Bounty Quattro	$30,000	84	$1,680,000	(Argentina) José Ignacio Barbero	$443,000	
March 17, 2024	(South Korea) Jeju	PLO 6-Max	$50,000	84	$4,200,000	(China) Biao Ding	$1,107,000	
March 18, 2024	(South Korea) Jeju	NLH Short Deck Ante Only	$25,000	52	$1,300,000	(Canada) Mike Watson	$380,000	
March 19, 2024	(South Korea) Jeju	NLH Short Deck Main Event	$50,000	67	$3,350,000	(China) Xuan Tan	$922,000	
March 20, 2024	(South Korea) Jeju	NLH Short Deck Ante Only	$100,000	34	$3,400,000	(Belarus) Mikita Badziakouski	$1,153,000	
March 21, 2024	(South Korea) Jeju	NLH Short Deck Ante Only	$20,000	42	$840,000	(England) Stephen Chidwick	$265,000	
May 12, 2024	Montenegro	NLH GGMillion$ Live	$25,000	163	$4,075,000	(United States) Chris Moneymaker	$903,000	
May 13, 2024	Montenegro	NLH 8-Handed	$25,000	135	$3,375,000	(China) Ni Liangace	$785,000	
May 14, 2024	Montenegro	NLH 8-Handed	$30,000	154	$4,620,000	(Canada) Mike Watson	$1,023,000	
May 15, 2024	Montenegro	NLH 7-Handed Mystery Bounty	$40,000	151	$3,020,000	(Belarus) Artsiom Lasouskii	$669,000	
May 16, 2024	Montenegro	NLH 7-Hended Bounty Quatro	$50,000	126	$4,380,000	(Ukraine) Igor Yaroshevskyy	$1,052,000	
May 17, 2024	Montenegro	NLH 8-Handed	$50,000	159	$7,950,000	(Spain) Adrián Mateos	$1,761,000	
May 18, 2024	Montenegro	NLH 8-Handed	$100,000	102	$10,200,000	(Bulgaria) Alex Kulev	$2,566,000	
May 20, 2024	Montenegro	NLH Main Event	$125,000	171	$21,375,000	(Belarus) Mikalai Vaskaboinikau	$4,737,000	
May 21, 2024	Montenegro	NLH Turbo	$50,000	53	$2,650,000	(United States) Nick Petrangelo	$775,000	
May 22, 2024	Montenegro	NLH 8-Handed	$200,000	93	$18,600,000	(Poland) Wiktor Malinowski	$4,789,000	
May 23, 2024	Montenegro	PLO	$25,000	82	$2,050,000	(Finland) Samuli Sipila	$535,000	
May 24, 2024	Montenegro	PLO Main Event	$100,000	83	$8,300,000	(Germany) Christopher Frank	$2,008,910	
May 25, 2024	Montenegro	PLO	$50,000	61	$3,050,000	(Finland) Samuli Sipila	$839,000	
May 26, 2024	Montenegro	PLO Quatro Bounty	$30,000	41	$1,230,000	(Denmark) Martin Dam	$250,000	
November 1, 2024	(Monaco) Monte Carlo	NLH WPT Global Ultimate Slam	$25,000	170	$4,250,000	(United States) Brian Kim	$941,000	
November 2, 2024	(Monaco) Monte Carlo	NLH 8-Handed	$30,000	144	$4,320,000	(Norway) Kayhan Roshanfekr	$1,005,000	
November 3, 2024	(Monaco) Monte Carlo	NLH 7-Handed Mystery Bounty	$40,000	155	$3,100,000	(Czech Republic) Roman Hrabec	$622,019	
November 4, 2024	(Monaco) Monte Carlo	NLH 8-Handed	$50,000	147	$7,350,000	(United States) William Foxen	$1,470,000	
November 5, 2024	(Monaco) Monte Carlo	NLH 8-Handed	$100,000	131	$13,100,000	(Germany) Pieter Aerts	$2,234,587	
November 6, 2024	(Monaco) Monte Carlo	NLH Turbo Bounty Quatro	$30,000	105	$2,110,000	(Russia) Artur Martirosyan	$531,000	
November 7, 2024	(Monaco) Monte Carlo	NLH The Special Triton Invitational	$200,000	102	$20,400,000	(Finland) Patrik Antonius	$5,130,000	
November 8, 2024	(Monaco) Monte Carlo	NLH 7-Handed	$50,000	123	$6,250,000	(United States) Jesse Lonis	$1,502,000	
November 9, 2024	(Monaco) Monte Carlo	NLH Main Event	$125,000	159	$19,875,000	(United States) Bryn Kenney	$4,410,000	
November 10, 2024	(Monaco) Monte Carlo	NLH Turbo	$60,000	61	$3,660,000	(Ukraine) Igor Yaroshevskyy	$862,357	
November 11, 2024	(Monaco) Monte Carlo	NLH 8-Handed	$150,000	121	$18,150,000	(Estonia) Vladimir Korzinin	$4,350,000	
November 12, 2024	(Monaco) Monte Carlo	PLO 6-Handed	$50,000	82	$4,100,000	(United States) Benjamin Tollerene	$1,070,000	
November 13, 2024	(Monaco) Monte Carlo	PLO Main Event	$100,000	87	$8,700,000	(Finland) Eelis Pärssinen	$2,270,000	
November 14, 2024	(Monaco) Monte Carlo	PLO Turbo Bounty Quatro	$25,000	75	$1,305,000	(Russia) Artur Martirosyan	$345,000	
December 7, 2024	(The Bahamas) Paradise Island	NLH WSOP Triton Million	$500,000	96	$44,603,000	(Argentina) Alejandro Lococo	$12,070,000	
December 10, 2024	(The Bahamas) Paradise Island	NLH WSOP Triton Main Event	$100,000	182	$18,200,000	(United States) William Alex Foxen	$3,850,000	
February 26, 2025	(South Korea) Jeju	NLH 8-Handed Single Re-entry	$15,000	379	$5,685,000	(China) Zhao Hongjun	$818,000	
February 27, 2025	(South Korea) Jeju	NLH 8-Handed	$20,000	348	$3,960,000	(Malaysia) Tuck Wai Foo	$1,350,000	
February 28, 2025	(South Korea) Jeju	NLH 8-Handed	$25,000	391	$9,775,000	(United States) Jeremy Ausmus	$1,892,000	
March 1, 2025	(South Korea) Jeju	NLH 8-Handed	$30,000	252	$7,560,000	(Azerbaijan) Ramin Hajiyev	$1,517,000	
March 2, 2025	(South Korea) Jeju	WPT Global Slam	$25,000	389	$9,725,000	(Russia) Anatoly Filatov	$1,882,000	
March 3, 2025	(South Korea) Jeju	NLH 7-Handed Mystery Bounty	$40,000	223	$8,920,000	(United States) Sean Winter	$935,000	
March 4, 2025	(South Korea) Jeju	NLH 7-Handed	$50,000	215	$10,750,000	(Austria) Mario Mosböck	$1,836,570	
March 5, 2025	(South Korea) Jeju	NLH 8-Handed	$150,000	128	$19,200,000	(Portugal) Joao Vieira	$4,610,000	
March 6, 2025	(South Korea) Jeju	NLH Turbo Bounty Quattro	$50,000	94	$4,700,000	(United States) Bryn Kenney	$839,000	
March 7, 2025	(South Korea) Jeju	NLH Main Event	$100,000	285	$28,500,000	(China) Wen Huang	$5,555,000	
March 8, 2025	(South Korea) Jeju	NLH 7-Handed	$125,000	93	$11,625,000	(Thailand) Punnat Punsri	$2,594,555	
March 9, 2025	(South Korea) Jeju	PLO 6-Handed	$25,000	117	$2,925,000	(Norway) Tom-Aksel Bedell	$709,000	
March 10, 2025	(South Korea) Jeju	PLO 6-Handed	$50,000	112	$5,600,000	(Hungary) Gergo Nagy	$1,360,000	
March 11, 2025	(South Korea) Jeju	PLO Main Event	$100,000	91	$9,100,000	(Spain) Sergio Gonzales	$2,340,000	
March 12, 2025	(South Korea) Jeju	PLO Bounty Quattro	$30,000	100	$2,000,000	(Spain) Lautaro Guerra Cabrerizo	$503,000	
March 13, 2025	(South Korea) Jeju	Short Deck Ante-only	$30,000	56	$1,680,000	(Ukraine) Artem Kobylynskyi	$492,000	
March 14, 2025	(South Korea) Jeju	Short Deck Ante-only PLPF	$50,000	45	$2,250,000	(China) Xuan Tan	$708,000	
March 15, 2025	(South Korea) Jeju	Short Deck Ante-only	$25,000	31	$775,000	(Malaysia) Wai Kiat Lee	$264,000	
May 13–15, 2025	Montenegro	WPT Global Slam	$25,000	155	$3,875,000	(Canada) Xuan Liu	$860,000	
May 14–15, 2025	Montenegro	NLH 8-Handed	$25,000	130	$3,250,000	(United States) William Alex Foxen	$755,000	
May 15–16, 2025	Montenegro	NLH 8-Handed	$30,000	147	$4,410,000	(Argentina) José Ignacio Barbero	$1,025,000	
May 16–17, 2025	Montenegro	NLH 7-Handed Mystery Bounty	$40,000	129	$2,580,000	(United States) Jesse Lonis	$619,000	
May 17–18, 2025	Montenegro	NLH 8-Handed	$50,000	143	$7,150,000	(United States) Seth Davies	$1,490,741	
May 18, 2025	Montenegro	NLH Turbo	$30,000	71	$2,130,000	(Malaysia) Wai Kiat Lee	$586,000	
May 19–21, 2025	Montenegro	NLH The Special Triton Invitational	$200,000	133	$26,600,000	(Montenegro) Aleksa Pavicevic	$6,180,000	
May 20–21, 2025	Montenegro	NLH 7-Handed	$50,000	100	$5,000,000	(Lithuania) Dominykas Mikolaitis	$1,258,000	
May 21–23, 2025	Montenegro	NLH Main Event	$100,000	180	$18,000,000	(United States) Jesse Lonis	$3,446,298	
May 22, 2025	Montenegro	NLH Turbo Bounty Quattro	$50,000	51	$1,770,000	(Austria) Matthias Eibinger	$531,000	
May 23–25, 2025	Montenegro	NLH 8-Handed	$150,000	108	$16,200,000	(United States) Jason Koon	$3,393,656	
May 24–25, 2025	Montenegro	PLO	$25,000	84	$2,100,000	(Thailand) Punnat Punsri	$550,000	
May 25–26, 2025	Montenegro	PLO Main Event	$100,000	93	$9,300,000	(United States) Benjamin Tollerene	$2,390,000	
May 26–27, 2025	Montenegro	PLO	$50,000	62	$3,100,000	(England) Richard Gryko	$884,000	
May 27, 2025	Montenegro	PLO Turbo Bounty Quattro	$30,000	51	$1,090,000	(United States) Jason Koon	$305,176	
September 8–9, 2025	(South Korea) Jeju	NLH Short Deck Ante-Only	$50,000	47	$2,232,500	(Malaysia) Richard Yong	$705,000	
September 8–11, 2025	(South Korea) Jeju	WPT Global Slam	$25,000	311	$7,308,500	(Philippines) James Mendoza	$1,515,000	
September 10–11, 2025	(South Korea) Jeju	NLH 8-Handed	$30,000	183	$5,160,600	(United States) Jonathan Jaffe	$1,061,672	
September 11–12, 2025	(South Korea) Jeju	NLH 7-Handed Mystery Bounty	$40,000	158	$5,940,800	(Japan) Jun Obara	$699,000	
September 12–13, 2025	(South Korea) Jeju	NLH 8-Handed	$60,000	154	$8,778,000	(China) Songquan Wang	$2,046,000	
September 13–14, 2025	(South Korea) Jeju	NLH 7-Handed	$50,000	146	$6,862,000	(Thailand) Punnat Punsri	$1,697,000	
September 14–16, 2025	(South Korea) Jeju	NLH 8-Handed	$150,000	114	$16,245,000	(Norway) Kayhan Roshanfekr	$3,835,059	
September 15–16, 2025	(South Korea) Jeju	NLH Turbo Bounty Quattro	$50,000	87	$4,176,000	(Montenegro) Aleksa Pavicevic	$781,000	
September 16–18, 2025	(South Korea) Jeju	NLH Main Event	$100,000	228	$21,432,000	(Germany) Christoph Vogelsang	$4,099,975	
September 17–18, 2025	(South Korea) Jeju	NLH 7-Handed	$125,000	69	$8,193,750	(Canada) Michael Watson	$2,130,812	
September 18–19, 2025	(South Korea) Jeju	PLO/NLH mix	$30,000	81	$2,332,800	(Argentina) José Ignacio Barbero	$646,000	
September 19–21, 2025	(South Korea) Jeju	PLO Main Event	$100,000	116	$11,136,000	(United States) Isaac Haxton	$2,789,000	
September 20–21, 2025	(South Korea) Jeju	PLO 6-Handed	$25,000	60	$1,440,000	(Russia) Artur Martirosyan	$421,000	
September 21–22, 2025	(South Korea) Jeju	PLO Triton 6-Handed	$50,000	64	$3,072,000	(China) Biao Ding	$880,000	
September 22–23, 2025	(South Korea) Jeju	PLO 6-Handed	$75,000	67	$4,824,000	(Finland) Joni Jouhkimainen	$1,381,000	
September 23, 2025	(South Korea) Jeju	PLO Turbo Bounty Quattro	$30,000	56	$1,555,200	(Hungary) Gergo Nagy	$310,000	
December 4, 2025	(The Bahamas) Paradise Island	PLO WSOP Triton	$75,000	93	$6,975,000	(Austria) Matthias Eibinger	$1,570,640	
December 5, 2025	(The Bahamas) Paradise Island	PLO WSOP Triton Main Event	$100,000	103	$10,300,000	(United States) Sam Soverel	$2,594,000	
December 7, 2025	(The Bahamas) Paradise Island	NLH WSOP Triton Invitational	$250,000	133	$33,250,000	(Norway) Kayhan Roshanfekr	$7,725,000	
December 8, 2025	(The Bahamas) Paradise Island	NLH WSOP Triton 7-Handed	$125,000	99	$12,375,000	(United States) David Coleman	$3,113,000	
December 9, 2025	(The Bahamas) Paradise Island	NLH WSOP Triton Main Event	$100,000	237	$23,700,000	(Latvia) Aleksejs Ponakovs	$4,750,000	
December 10, 2025	(The Bahamas) Paradise Island	NLH WSOP Triton 8-Handed	$150,000	77	$11,550,000	(Brazil) João Simão	$3,067,000	
March 14, 2026	(South Korea) Jeju	NLH Short Deck Ante-Only PLPF	$25,000	40	$975,000	(Netherlands) Rene van Krevelen	$308,000	
March 15, 2026	(South Korea) Jeju	NLH Short Deck Ante-Only PLPF	$50,000	60	$3,000,000	(Malaysia) Wai Kiat Lee	$840,000	
March 15, 2026	(South Korea) Jeju	NLH Short Deck Ante-Only PLPF	$100,000	46	$4,600,000	(Canada) Daniel Dvoress	$1,380,000	
March 16, 2026	(South Korea) Jeju	NLH 8-Handed	$20,000	247	$4,940,000	(Armenia) Aren Bezhanyan	$990,000	
March 17, 2026	(South Korea) Jeju	NLH Jupiter Event	$25,000	262	$6,550,000	(China) Quan Zhou	$1,303,000	
March 18, 2026	(South Korea) Jeju	NLH 8-Handed	$30,000	172	$5,160,000	(China) Ming Chen	$1,143,000	
March 19, 2026	(South Korea) Jeju	NLH Mystery Bounty 7-Handed	$40,000	160	$3,200,000	(Brazil) Alisson Piekazewicz	$709,000	
March 20, 2026	(South Korea) Jeju	NLH 8-Handed	$60,000	139	$8,340,000	(Austria) Daniel Rezaei	$1,939,000	
March 21, 2026	(South Korea) Jeju	NLH 7-Handed	$50,000	116	$5,800,000	(Germany) Sebastian Gaehl	$1,392,000	
March 22, 2026	(South Korea) Jeju	NLH 7-Handed	$125,000	84	$10,500,000	(Austria) Bernhard Binder	$2,137,953	
March 23, 2026	(South Korea) Jeju	NLH Turbo	$30,000	99	$2,969,999	(Morocco) Mehdi Chaoui	$747,000	
March 24, 2026	(South Korea) Jeju	NLH MAIN EVENT	$100,000	178	$17,800,000	(United States) Benjamin Tollerene	$3,766,000	
March 25, 2026	(South Korea) Jeju	NLH Bounty Quattro Turbo	$50,000	46	$1,580,000	(United States) Jesse Lonis	$474,000	
March 26, 2026	(South Korea) Jeju	NLH 10th Anniversary Special	$150,000	81	$12,150,000	(Malaysia) Paul Phua	$3,226,000	
March 27, 2026	(South Korea) Jeju	PLO/NLH Mix	$30,000	60	$1,800,000	(Thailand) Punnat Punsri	$504,000	
March 28, 2026	(South Korea) Jeju	PLO Mystery Bounty	$50,000	73	$1,825,000	(Russia) Artur Martirosyan	$494,000	
March 29, 2026	(South Korea) Jeju	PLO MAIN EVENT	$100,000	65	$6,500,000	(Austria) Matthias Eibinger	$1,787,000	
March 30, 2026	(South Korea) Jeju	PLO 6-Handed	$25,000	53	$1,325,000	(Malaysia) Wai Chan	$387,000	
March 31, 2026	(South Korea) Jeju	PLO 6-Handed	$75,000	60	$4,500,000	(United States) William Foxen	$1,260,000	
April 1, 2026	(South Korea) Jeju	PLO Bounty Quattro Turbo	$30,000	39	$770,000	(Wales) Robert Cowen	$242,000	
May 13, 2026	Montenegro	NLH Golden Decade	$25,000	146	$3,650,000	(Canada) Daniel Dvoress	$849,000	
May 14, 2026	Montenegro	NLH 8-Handed	$25,000	119	$2,975,000	(Russia) Anatoly Zlotnikov	$715,000	
May 15, 2026	Montenegro	NLH 8-Handed	$30,000	133	$3,990,000	(Austria) Mario Mosboeck	$928,000	
May 16, 2026	Montenegro	NLH Mystery Bounty	$40,000	111	$2,220,000	(Germany) Fedor Holz	$1,208,811	
May 17, 2026	Montenegro	NLH 8-Handed	$50,000	132	$6,600,000	(Germany) Christopher Nguyen	$1,535,000	
May 18, 2026	Montenegro	NLH Turbo	$30,000	84	$2,520,000	(Canada) Michael Watson	$659,000	
May 19, 2026	Montenegro	NLH Triton Invitational	$200,000	137	$27,400,000	(Spain) Adrián Mateos	$6,370,000	
May 20, 2026	Montenegro	NLH 7-Handed	$50,000	118	$5,900,000	(Germany) Christoph Vogelsang	$1,037,858	
May 21, 2026	Montenegro	NLH MAIN EVENT	$100,000	159	$15,900,000	(Hong Kong) Daniel Tang	$3,522,000	
May 22, 2026	Montenegro	NLH Bounty Quattro Turbo	$65,000	32	$1,600,000	(Canada) Michael Watson	$381,000	
May 23, 2026	Montenegro	NLH 10th Anniversary Special	$150,000	76	$11,400,000	(Latvia) Aleksejs Ponakovs	$3,027,000	
May 24, 2026	Montenegro	PLO/NLH Mix	$30,000	53	$1,590,000	(Germany) Tobias Schwecht	$465,000	
May 25, 2026	Montenegro	PLO MAIN EVENT	$100,000	76	$7,600,000	(Canada) Daniel Dvoress	$2,018,000	
May 26, 2026	Montenegro	PLO Mystery Bounty	$75,000	47	$2,350,000	(Austria) Matthias Eibinger	$1,053,000	
May 27, 2026	Montenegro	PLO 6-Handed	$75,000	59	$4,425,000	(United Kingdom) Richard Gryko	$1,243,000	
May 28, 2026	Montenegro	PLO Bounty Quattro Turbo	$25,000	46	$1,150,000	(Canada) Daniel Dvoress	$255,000	
September 4, 2026	(South Korea) Jeju II	NLH 8-Handed	$15,000	206	$3,090,000	(Greece) Alexandros Theologis	$642,000	
September 5, 2026	(South Korea) Jeju II	NLH 8-Handed	$20,000	174	$3,480,000	(Austria) Klemens Roiter	$772,000	
September 6, 2026	(South Korea) Jeju II	NLH Titi Poker	$25,000	210	$5,250,000	(Vietnam) Khoa Anh Ngo	$1,090,000	
September 7, 2026	(South Korea) Jeju II	NLH 8-Handed	$25,000	131	$3,275,000	(Belarus) Aliaksei Boika	$761,000	
September 8, 2026	(South Korea) Jeju II	NLH 8-Handed	$30,000	135	$4,050,000	(Canada) Daniel Dvoress	$942,000	
September 9, 2026	(South Korea) Jeju II	NLH Mystery Bounty	$40,000	133	$2,660,000	(Malaysia) Wai Kiat Lee	$619,000	
September 10, 2026	(South Korea) Jeju II	NLH 8-Handed	$50,000	129	$6,449,998	(Brazil) Pedro Padilha	$1,400,860	
September 11, 2026	(South Korea) Jeju II	NLH Turbo	$30,000	70	$2,100,000	(United States) Alex Anton	$577,000	
September 12, 2026	(South Korea) Jeju II	NLH Triton Invitational	$200,000	173	$34,600,000	(Brazil) Joao Simao	$7,250,000	
September 13, 2026	(South Korea) Jeju II	NLH 7-Handed	$50,000	70	$3,500,000	(United States) Matthew Wantman	$836,721	
September 14, 2026	(South Korea) Jeju II	NLH MAIN EVENT	$100,000	196	$19,600,000	(United States) Nick Schulman	$3,854,888	
September 15, 2026	(South Korea) Jeju II	NLH Bounty Quattro Turbo	$50,000	35	$1,750,000	(United States) Benjamin Tollerene	$412,000	
September 16, 2026	(South Korea) Jeju II	NLH Triton 10th Anniversary Special	$150,000	67	$10,050,000	(United States) Nick Petrangelo	$2,212,910	
September 17, 2026	(South Korea) Jeju II	NLH Turbo	$30,000	23	$690,000	(China) Ye Wang	$256,000	
November 15-28, 2026	Northern Cyprus							

=== Triton ONE Series ===
Start date	Location	Tournament	Buy-in	Entrants	Prize Pool	Winner	Winner Prize	Source
September 2–4, 2025	(South Korea) Jeju Province	NLH Genesis	$3,000	1,185	$3,177,814	(China) Cheng Hu	$564,000	
September 3, 2025	(South Korea) Jeju Province	NLHE 8-Handed	$5,000	48	$222,240	(Hong Kong) Doyle Lee	$67,000	
September 4–5, 2025	(South Korea) Jeju Province	Mystery Bounty 8-Handed	$10,000	273	$1,234,100	(China) Xiaqing Ji	$245,000	
September 4, 2025	(South Korea) Jeju Province	NLH Bounty Quattro	$5,000	89	$302,070	(Denmark) Johan Schultz-Pedersen	$78,000	
September 5–8, 2025	(South Korea) Jeju Province	NLH MAIN EVENT	$8,000	1,046	$7,607,558	(Germany) Joshua Gebissa	$975,225	
September 5, 2025	(South Korea) Jeju Province	NLHE 8-Handed	$2,000	169	$312,988	(Japan) Yoko Sasaki	$69,000	
September 6, 2025	(South Korea) Jeju Province	NLHE High Roller	$20,000	56	$1,075,200	(China) Chenxiang Miao	$315,000	
September 6, 2025	(South Korea) Jeju Province	NLHE 8-Handed	$2,000	132	$244,464	(Vietnam) Khoa Anh Ngo	$58,700	
September 7–8, 2025	(South Korea) Jeju Province	NLH High Roller	$15,000	353	$4,995,303	(Singapore) un Hao Wu	$969,000	
September 7, 2025	(South Korea) Jeju Province	NLH Bounty Quattro	$2,000	189	$256,028	(Austria) Samuel Mullur	$54,000	
March 5–7, 2026	(South Korea) Jeju Province	NLH QQPK Genesis	$3,000	1,236	$3,311,244	(Vietnam) Huu Dung Nguyen	$586,000	
March 6, 2026	(South Korea) Jeju Province	NLH Bounty Quattro	$2,000	119	$220,388	(China) Renjie Ding	$38,500	
March 7–9, 2026	(South Korea) Jeju Province	NLH Mystery Bounty 8-Handed	$5,000	836	$3,800,456	(Japan) Yuna Kanaizumi	$395,000	
March 8, 2026	(South Korea) Jeju Province	NLH One-W Championship	$3,000	67	$179,493	(China) Yi Sha Chen	$49,000	
March 9, 2026	(South Korea) Jeju Province	NLH 7-Handed	$10,000	347	$3,154,577	(Vietnam) Khoa Anh Ngo	$612,000	
March 9, 2026	(South Korea) Jeju Province	NLH One-W Night Bounty Quattro	$2,000	59	$109,268	(Taiwan) Sin Lan Chen	$23,300	
March 10, 2026	(South Korea) Jeju Province	NLH MAIN EVENT	$8,000	1,230	$8,945,790	(China) Wenjie Zhao	$1,160,000	
March 10–15, 2026	(South Korea) Jeju Province	PLO 6-Handed	$6,000	90	$499,950	(New Zealand) JP Rounce-Sue	$129,000	
March 10–11, 2026	(South Korea) Jeju Province	PLO 6-Handed	$3,000	253	$468,556	(China) Zhihua Yang	$94,000	
March 10, 2026	(South Korea) Jeju Province	NLH One Night 8-Handed	$2,000	88	$244,376	(Russia) Artur Martirosyan	$64,000	
March 11, 2026	(South Korea) Jeju Province	PLO One Night 6-Handed	$2,000	90	$164,828	(Canada) Curtis Muller	$43,000	
March 12, 2026	(South Korea) Jeju Province	NLH 7-Handed	$5,000	226	$1,046,154	(China) Chen Peng	$214,000	
March 12, 2026	(South Korea) Jeju Province	NLH One Night 8-Handed	$2,000	184	$340,768	(Canada) Timmothy Chung	$60,766	
March 13–15, 2026	(South Korea) Jeju Province	NLH High Roller	$15,000	490	$6,933,990	(Malaysia) Ang Siang	$932,000	
November 4–15, 2026	Northern Cyprus							

== All Time Money List ==
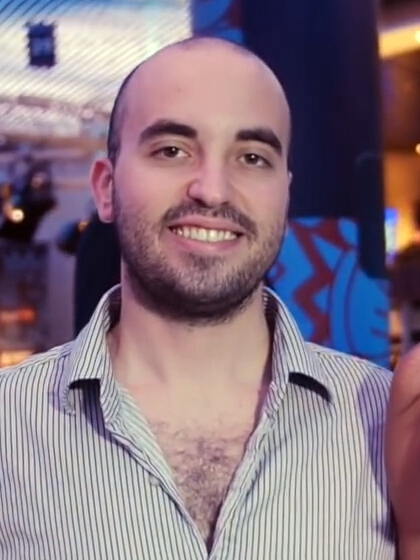
Bryn Kenney

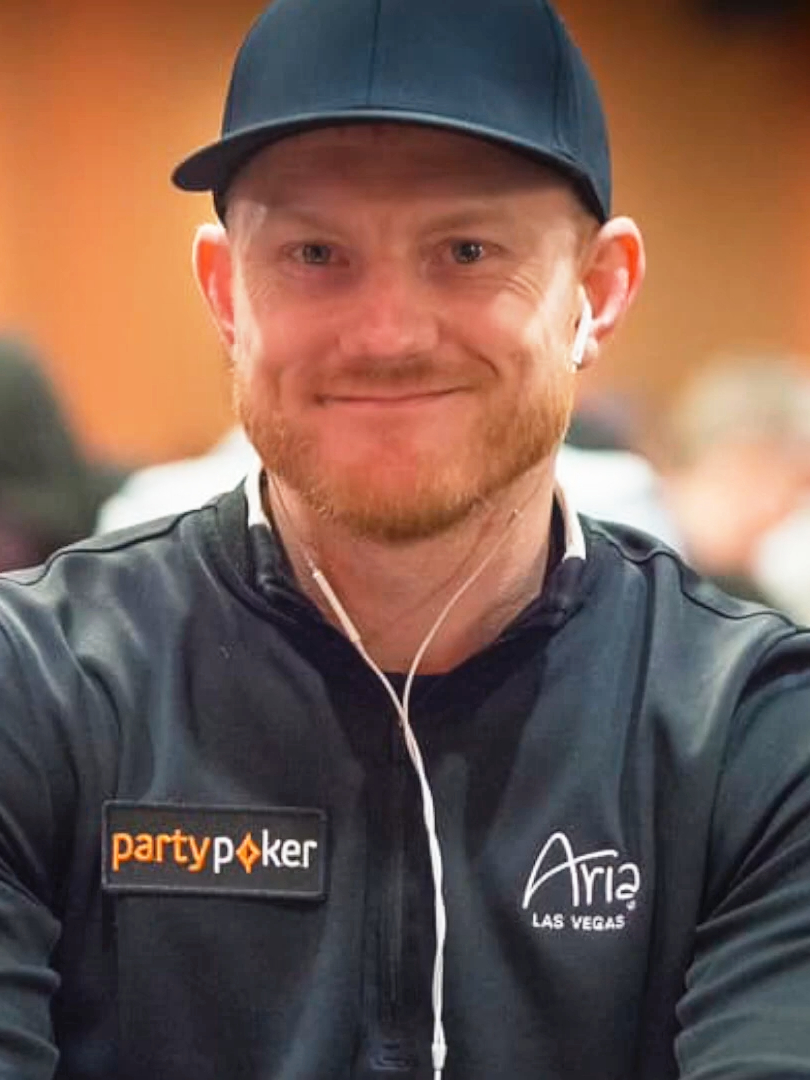
Jason Koon

Note: All Time Money List is correct as of September 19, 2026.

Rank	Player	Earnings	Wins	Cashes
1	(United States) Bryn Kenney	$51,314,802	5	27
2	(United States) Jason Koon	$40,914,284	12	81
3	(United Kingdom) Stephen Chidwick	$35,216,106	3	80
4	(Canada) Daniel Dvoress	$34,821,982	7	80
5	(Belarus) Mikita Badziakouski	$32,413,817	5	60
6	(Hong Kong) Danny Tang	$32,298,454	6	73
7	(Thailand) Punnat Punsri	$30,016,130	6	55
8	(Latvia) Aleksejs Ponakovs	$29,864,829	2	41
9	(Malaysia) Paul Phua	$26,589,082	2	60
10	(United States) Dan Smith	$26,059,816	2	38

While the all-time money list is led by Bryn Kenney, ranking players by return on investment rather than gross winnings reorders the leaderboard substantially, as top earnings are heavily skewed by the 2019 Triton Million for Charity. By repeatable ROI, players such as Aleks Poņakovs (+86% across 40 entries) and Punnat Punsri (+64%) rank among the most profitable in the series' history.
