= Jeju Shinhwa World =

Entertainment complex on Jeju Island, South Korea

- Interactive map of Jeju Shinhwa World
- Location: Sinhwayeoksa-ro 304beon-gil, Andeok-myeon, Seogwipo, Jeju Island 63521, South Korea
- Coordinates: 33.30645°N 126.31620°E
- Opened: April 2017; 9 years ago
- Theme: Casino theme park resort
- Operating season: Year-round

The Jeju Shinhwa World is a fully integrated South Korean resort located on Jeju Island. The resort has a casino, multiple theme parks, and hotels. The first building, Somerset Jeju Shinhwa World, opened in April 2017. On 25 February 2018, the resort had its grand opening.

== History ==
Prior to the establishment of the resort, Landing International purchased the land with the intent of opening a casino called the Landing Casino. After the warming of China–South Korea relations, Jeju granted Chinese citizens 30-day visa-free stays. The park expected to provide approximately 5,000 jobs when it became fully operational.

In April 2017, the resort opened its first location, the Somerset Jeju Shinhwa World. In September of that year, Shinhwa Theme Park opened in a partnership with TUBAn Company Limited. In November, Landing Convention Centre and YG Republique, a "food and beverage and entertainment complex", opened. In December, the resort opened Jeju Shinhwa World Marriott Resort and Shinhwa Shoppes.

The Jeju Shinhwa World Theme Park opened on September 30, 2017. It covers 280,000 square meters in south-west Jeju. The theme park is split into three zones which cover stories of ancient and medieval times. The park consists of "roller coasters, rides, exhibits, and live performances".

On 25 February 2018, the resort had its official grand opening. In the summer of 2018, Shinhwa Waterpark opened. The resort expected to open Jeju Shinhwa World Four Seasons Resort & Spa, a luxury hotel, and Lionsgate Movie World by 2020. Lionsgate Movie World is in collaboration with Lionsgate Entertainment Corp. Construction was expected to begin in 2019.

South Korean singer-songwriter and rapper, G-Dragon, was announced as the official ambassador of Shinhwa World. G-Dragon directly participated in the development, design, and planning of the concept of the resort complex.

The casinos are opened only to foreigners due to South Korean law.

== Landing Casino ==
In 2018, the Landing Casino hosted the Triton Poker SHR Jeju, one of the first televised short deck hold 'em events. The line up included Tom Dwan, Paul Phua, Jason Koon, Andrew Robl, Elton Tsang, Qiang Wang and Tan Xuan.
