= 2020 World Series of Poker Online =

Series of online poker tournaments

- Location: Online (WSOP.com and GGPoker)
- Dates: July 1-September 8, 2020

Champion
- (Bulgaria) Stoyan Madanzhiev

The 2020 World Series of Poker Online was a series of online poker tournaments organized by the World Series of Poker (WSOP). It was held from July 1-September 8 and featured 85 bracelet events, 31 on WSOP.com and 54 on GGPoker.

In June, the WSOP announced the series as a result of postponing the 2020 WSOP in Las Vegas, Nevada due to the COVID-19 pandemic. Events included the $50 Big 50, the lowest buy-in WSOP event in history, as well as four People's Choice tournaments that allowed players to vote on which game to play. The series culminated in the $5,000 No Limit Hold'em Main Event beginning on August 16 with a $25 million guaranteed prize pool, the largest in online poker history.

Poker Central and GGPoker.TV streamed 12 final tables during the series. Tournaments on WSOP.com were open only to players located in Nevada or New Jersey, while GGPoker events were open to international players.

The first two events on GGPoker were expected to conclude on July 19. After a bug was discovered on the site's servers, however, the tournaments were postponed by a week.

== WSOP.com Schedule ==
Key: (bracelet number for 2020/bracelet number for career)

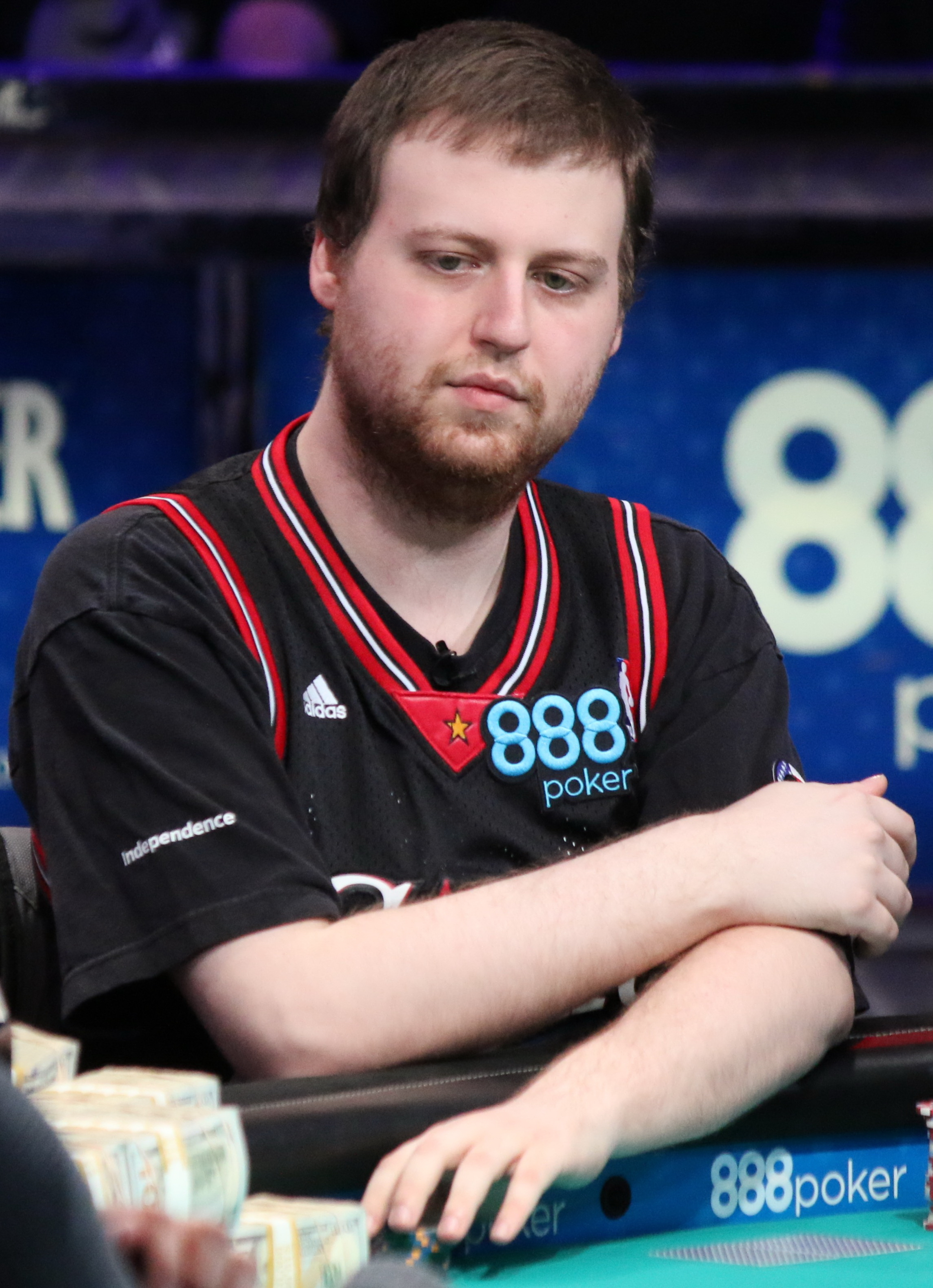
Former Main Event champ Joe McKeehen won Event #14

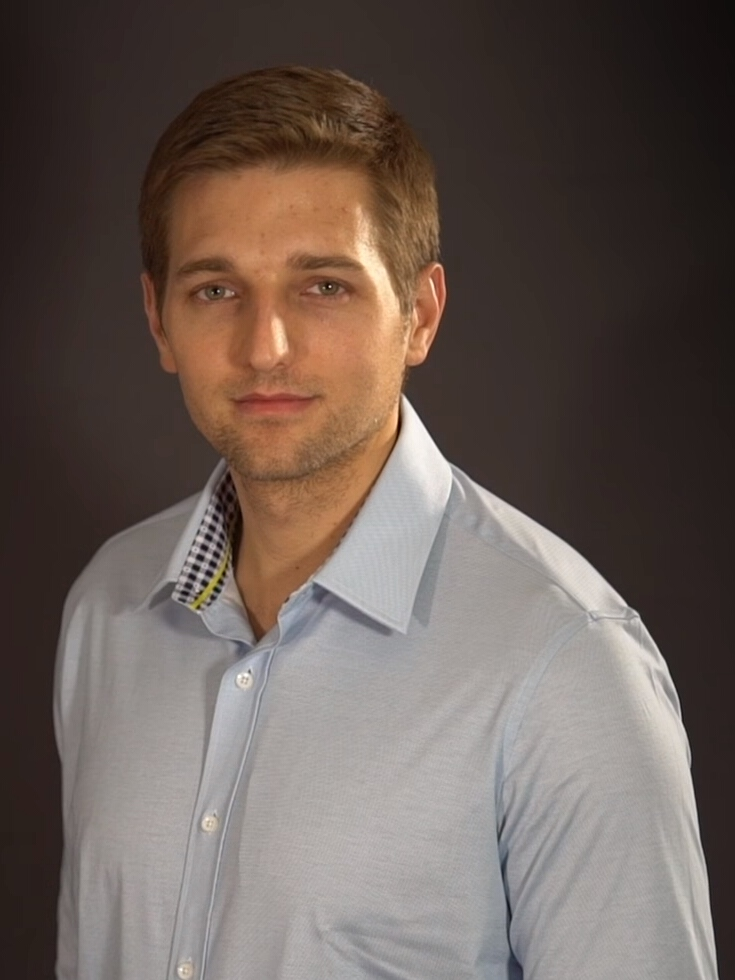
WPT commentator Tony Dunst earned his second bracelet in Event #21

#	Event	Entrants	Winner	Prize	Runner-up
1	$500 No Limit Hold'em Kick-off	1,715	(United States) Jonathan Dokler (1/1)	$130,426	(United States) Justin Turner
2	$1,000 No Limit Hold'em 8-Handed Deepstack	919	(United States) Louis Lynch (1/1)	$168,586	(United States) Ryan Ko
3	$400 No Limit Hold'em	2,091	(United States) Robert Kuhn (1/1)	$115,850	(United States) Ronald Keren
4	$500 No Limit Hold'em Super Turbo	1,179	(United States) Matt Bode (1/1)	$97,091	(United States) Brian Frasca
5	$1,000 No Limit Hold'em Freezeout	854	(United States) Allen Chang (1/1)	$161,287	(Sweden) Philip Yeh
6	$600 PLO8 6-Handed	833	(United States) Nathan Gamble (1/2)	$89,425	(United States) Shane Daniels
7	$800 No Limit Hold'em Knockout Deepstack	989	(United States) Joon Kim (1/1)	$103,127	(United States) Stephen McManus
8	$500 No Limit Hold'em Freezeout	1,479	(United States) Alan Goehring (1/1)	$119,400	(United States) Ross Gottlieb
9	$1,000 No Limit Hold'em 6-Max	1,026	(United States) Ron McMillen (1/1)	$188,215	(United States) Ryan Torgersen
10	$600 No Limit Hold'em Monster Stack	2,074	(United States) Ryan Torgersen (1/1)	$172,362	(United States) Brandon Ienn
11	$500 No Limit Hold'em Turbo Deepstack 6-Handed	1,691	(Belarus) Raman Afanasenka (1/1)	$128,601	(United States) Chance Kornuth (0/2)
12	$500 The Big 500 No Limit Hold'em	2,427	(United States) Ryan DePaulo (1/1)	$159,563	(United Kingdom) Jack Salter
13	$1,500 No Limit Hold'em High Roller Freezeout	649	(United States) Michael Lech (1/1)	$164,249	(United States) William Romaine
14	$3,200 No Limit Hold'em High Roller	496	(United States) Joe McKeehen (1/3)	$352,985	(United States) Frank Funaro
15	$1,000 PLO 8-Max High Roller	663	(United States) Guy Dunlap (1/1)	$133,780	(United States) Shane Daniels
16	$500 No Limit Hold'em Turbo	1,528	(United States) Terrell Cheatham (1/1)	$116,204	(United States) Julian Parmann
17	$777 No Limit Hold'em	1,382	(United States) Pat Lyons (1/1)	$173,552	(United States) Christopher Ginley
18	$1,000 No Limit Hold'em 8-Handed Turbo Deepstack	987	(Canada) Scott Hempel (1/1)	$181,060	(United States) Myles Kotler
19	$400 No Limit Hold'em	2,545	(United States) Kenny Huynh (1/1)	$133,857	(United States) Matthew Berger
20	$500 PLO 6-Handed	1,137	(United States) Kevin Gerhart (1/2)	$97,572	(United States) Cody Brinn
21	$777 No Limit Hold'em 6-Handed	1,361	(United States) Tony Dunst (1/2)	$168,342	(United States) James Pace
22	$500 No Limit Hold'em Turbo Deepstack	1,579	(United States) Allan Cheung (1/1)	$120,083	(United States) Myles Kotler
23	$500 No Limit Hold'em Knockout	1,452	(United States) Raymond Avant (1/1)	$93,776	(United States) Scott Epstein
24	$400 No Limit Hold'em 8-Handed	2,408	(United States) Nick Binger (1/2)	$133,413	(United States) Ryan Leng (0/1)
25	$500 No Limit Hold'em Summer Saver	2,155	(United States) Nicholas Kiley (1/1)	$149,245	(United States) Guo Liang Chen
26	$500 No Limit Hold'em Grande Finale	2,502	(United States) Ethan Yau (1/1)	$164,494	(United States) Brian Patrick
27	$400 No Limit Hold'em Freezeout	1,940	(United States) Ian Steinman (1/1)	$110,557	(United States) Satoshi Tanaka
28	$1,000 Omaha 8 6-Max	525	(United States) William Romaine (1/1)	$110,673	(United States) Mark Ioli
29	$2,000 No Limit Hold'em Deepstack	747	(United States) Nick Guagenti (1/1)	$305,433	(United States) Matthew Parry
30	$500 No Limit Hold'em Seniors Event	720	(United States) Jonathan Lessin (1/1)	$64,411	(United States) James Moore (0/2)
31	$1,000 No Limit Hold'em Championship	2,126	(United States) Nahrain Tamero (1/1)	$310,832	(United States) Norman Michalek

=== WSOP.com Leaderboard ===
Final Standings
Rank	Name	Points	Bracelets
1	(United States) Ian Steinman	3,186.94	1
2	(United States) Ryan Torgersen	3,085.34	1
3	(United States) Robert Kuhn	2,996.16	1
4	(Sweden) Philip Yeh	2,714.33	0
5	(United States) William Romaine	2,639.85	1
6	(United States) Roland Israelashvili	2,636.90	0
7	(United States) Tony Dunst	2,599.53	1
8	(United States) Bryan Piccioli	2,496.33	0
9	(United States) Jonathan Dokler	2,466.78	1
10	(United States) Joe McKeehen	2,459.86	1

== GGPoker Schedule ==
Key: (bracelet number for 2020/bracelet number for career)

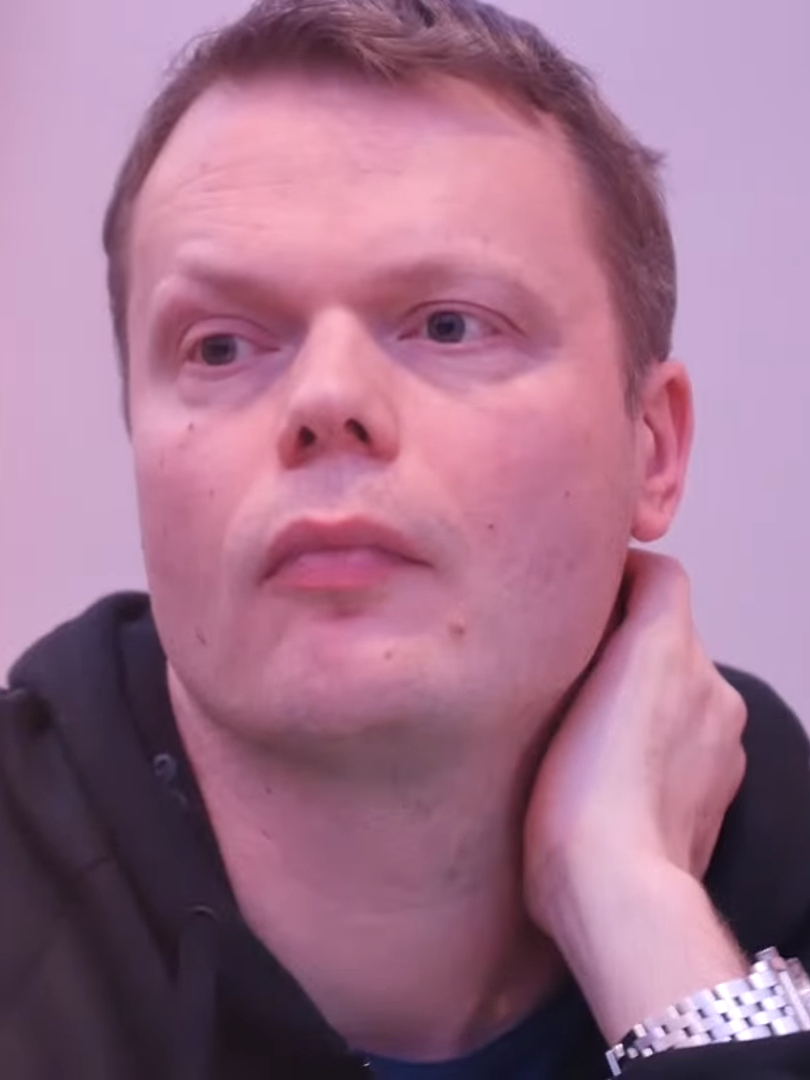
Juha Helppi won his second bracelet in Event #4

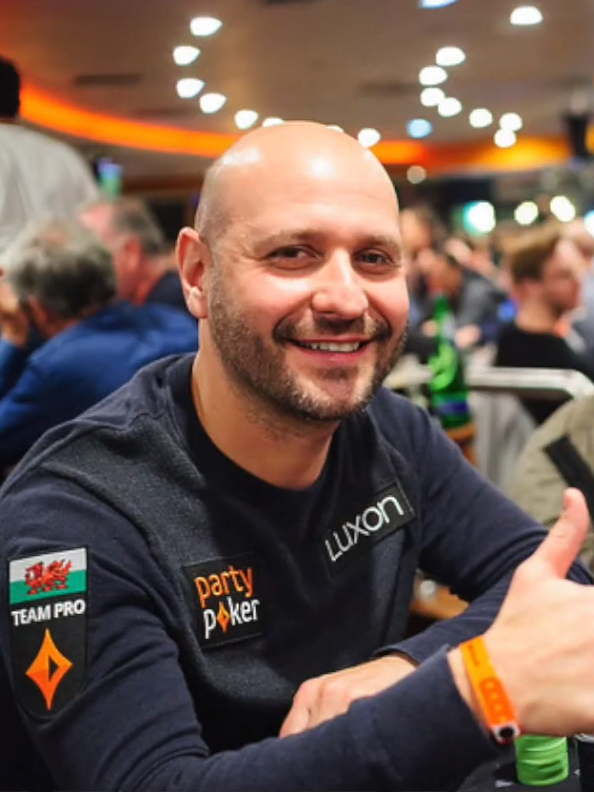
Roberto Romanello won his first bracelet in Event #8, completing the Triple Crown

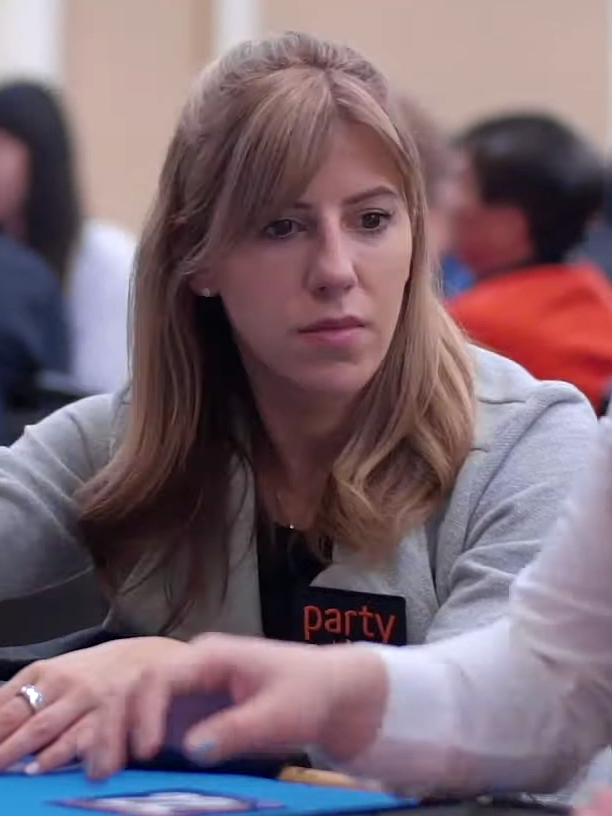
Kristen Bicknell won her third bracelet in Event #13

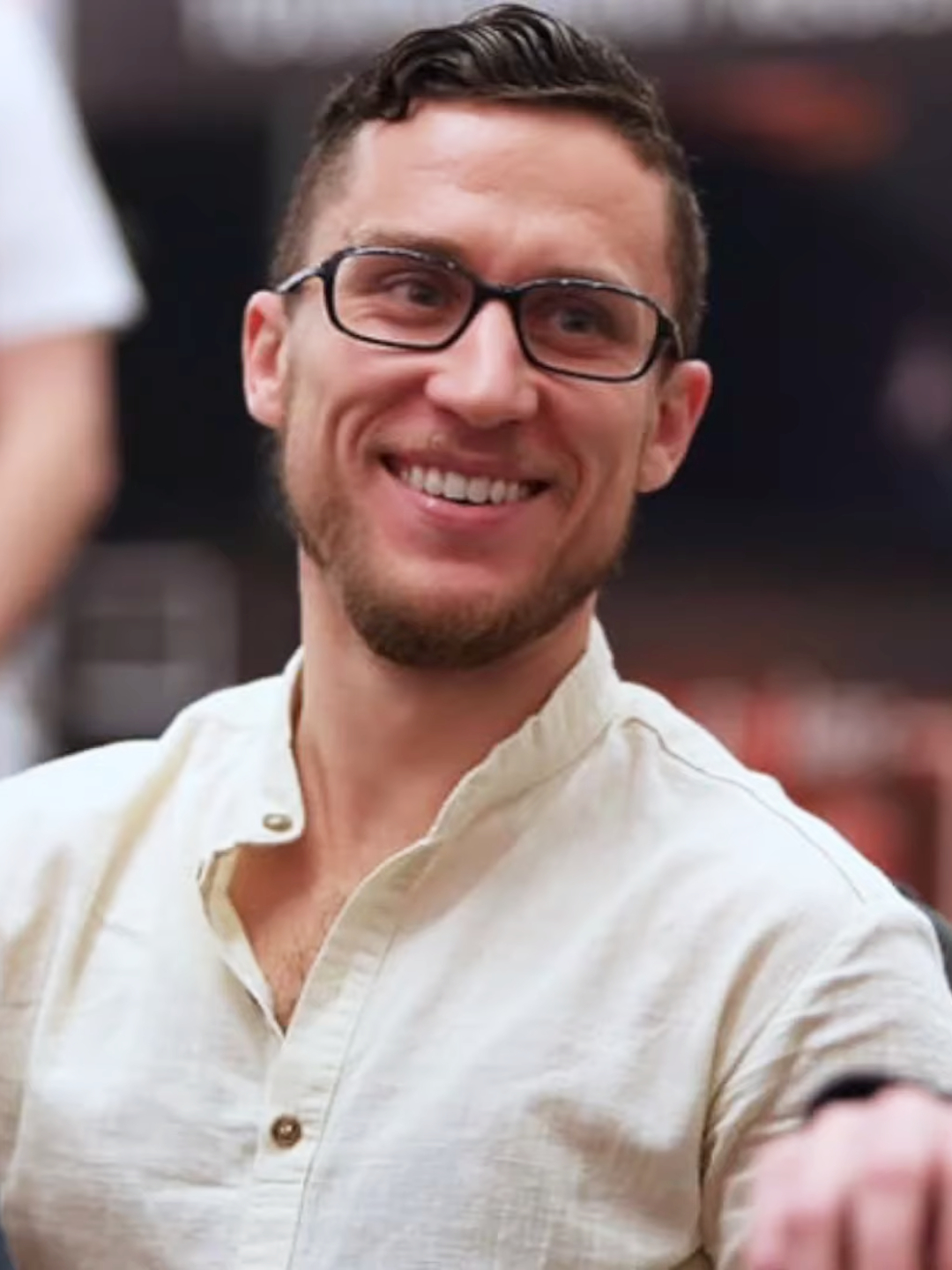
Daniel Dvoress won his first bracelet in Event #17

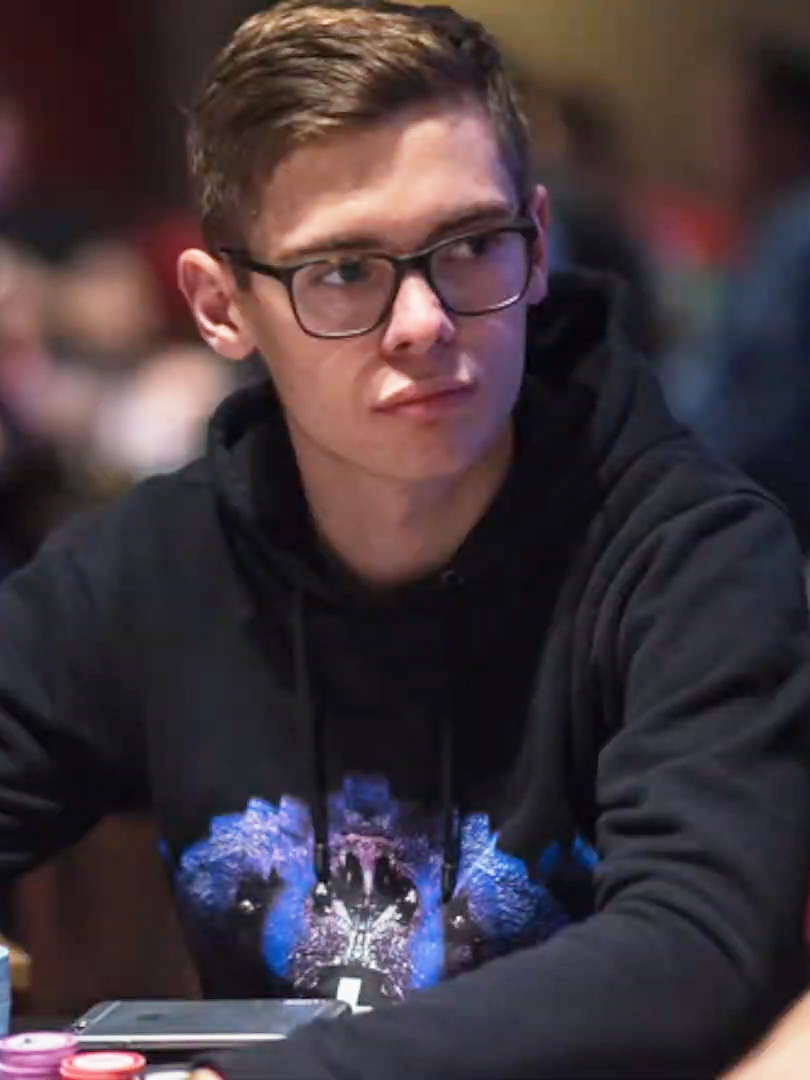
Fedor Holz won his second bracelet in Event #48

#	Event	Entrants	Winner	Prize	Runner-up
1	$100 The Opener	29,306	(Brazil) Marcelo Jakovljevic (1/1)	$265,879	(South Africa) Ronit Chamani
2	$1,111 Every 1 for Covid Relief	2,323	(Canada) Alek Stasiak (1/1)	$343,203	(Argentina) Martin Ilobera
3	$525 No Limit Hold'em Super Turbo Bounty 6-Handed	2,214	(Japan) Shoma Ishikawa (1/1)	$82,425	(Argentina) Diego Ostrovich
4	$5,000 Pot Limit Omaha Championship	328	(Finland) Juha Helppi (1/2)	$290,286	(Spain) Jesús Cortés
5	$1,500 Fifty Stack No Limit Hold'em	1,342	(South Africa) Michael Clacher (1/1)	$297,496	(Brazil) Rodrigo Caprioli
6	$1,050 Bounty Pot Limit Omaha	971	(Australia) Hun Wei Lee (1/1)	$79,896	(Finland) Janne Peltoniemi
7	$600 Monster Stack No Limit Hold'em 6-Handed	2,007	(China) Aaron Wijaya (1/1)	$171,389	(Spain) Toni Bosch
8	$1,500 No Limit Hold'em	922	(United Kingdom) Roberto Romanello (1/1)	$216,213	(Sweden) Niklas Astedt
9	$2,500 Pot Limit Omaha	532	(Sweden) Simon Lofberg (1/1)	$224,493	(Norway) Andreas Torbergsen
10	$400 Colossus	12,757	(Estonia) Ranno Sootla (1/1)	$595,930	(Greece) Paraskevas Tsokaridis
11	$400 Plossus	4,356	(Brazil) Yuri Dzivielevski (1/2)	$221,557	(United States) Matt Vengrin
12	$10,000 Short Deck No Limit Hold'em Championship	130	(Mexico) Lev Gottlieb (1/1)	$276,393	(Belarus) Mikita Badziakouski
13	$2,500 No Limit Hold'em 6-Handed	892	(Canada) Kristen Bicknell (1/3)	$356,411	(Brazil) Belarmino De Souza
14	$840 Bounty No Limit Hold'em	2,382	(United Kingdom) Patrick Kennedy (1/1)	$140,768	(United States) Josh Pollock (0/2)
15	$500 Deepstack No Limit Hold'em	2,307	(South Korea) Sung Joo Hyun (1/1)	$161,898	(China) Yiduo Yu
16	$1,000 Short Deck No Limit Hold'em	487	(Malaysia) Paul Teoh (1/1)	$82,202	(United States) Michelle Shah
17	$1,500 Millionaire Maker	6,299	(Canada) Daniel Dvoress (1/1)	$1,489,289	(Brazil) Caio De Almeida
18	$500 Turbo Deepstack No Limit Hold'em	2,978	(Lithuania) Vladas Burneikis (1/1)	$192,523	(France) Pierre Merlin
19	$2,100 No Limit Hold'em Bounty Championship	1,168	(Italy) Enrico Camosci (1/1)	$184,579	(Turkey) Omer Ozsirkinti
20	$400 Pot Limit Omaha	2,005	(Republic of Ireland) Eoghan O'Dea (1/1)	$100,945	(Canada) Nital Jethalal
21	$1,000 No Limit Hold'em	2,006	(Canada) Alek Stasiak (2/2)	$273,505	(India) Kunal Bhatia
22	$800 Double Stack Pot Limit Omaha	831	(United States) Frank Crivello (1/1)	$94,253	(United Kingdom) Craig Timmis
23	$10,000 Heads Up No Limit Hold'em Championship	128	(United States) David Peters (1/2)	$360,480	(Australia) Michael Addamo (0/2)
24	HK$8,000 No Limit Hold'em Asia Championship	3,247	(Brazil) Luis Assunção (1/1)	$458,246	(Greece) Alexandros Theologis
25	$1,500 GGMasters WSOP Edition	2,153	(United States) Seth Fischer (1/1)	$444,869	(Russia) Arsenii Karmatckii
26	$150 GGMasters WSOP Edition	9,835	(Russia) Anatoly Suvarov (1/1)	$183,526	(Chile) David Edelstein
27	$5,000 No Limit Hold'em 6-Handed Championship	672	(Israel) Ravid Garbi (1/1)	$531,513	(United Kingdom) Chris Moorman (0/1)
28	$2,500 Double Stack No Limit Hold'em	1,061	(Brazil) Leonardo Mattos (1/1)	$399,047	(Germany) Christopher Pütz
29	$525 Bounty No Limit Hold'em 6-Handed	3,170	(Turkey) Orhan Ateş (1/1)	$114,584	(Austria) Tobias Schwecht
30	$300 Monster Stack No Limit Hold'em 6-Handed	3,491	(United Kingdom) Alexander Stacey (1/1)	$127,660	(United States) Craig Lecompte
31	$1,500 Pot Limit Omaha	990	(United States) Bradley Ruben (1/1)	$220,160	(Israel) Dorel Eldabach
32	$500 Mini Main Event	15,205	(Croatia) Ivan Žufić (1/1)	$843,460	(India) Suraj Mishra
33	$840 Turbo Bounty No Limit Hold'em	2,207	(India) Kartik Ved (1/1)	$131,461	(Russia) Konstantin Maslak (0/1)
34	$600 No Limit Hold'em Deepstack Championship	2,911	(Ukraine) Dmytro Bystrovzorov (1/1)	$227,906	(Austria) Florian Gaugusch
35	$800 Pot Limit Omaha	1,281	(Republic of Ireland) Toby Joyce (1/1)	$139,453	(United States) Mark Herm
36	$500 Limit Hold'em	706	(Austria) Gregor Müller (1/1)	$45,102	(Brazil) Brunno Botteon
37	$500 Deepstack No Limit Hold'em	2,315	(Hong Kong) Anson Tsang (1/2)	$150,460	(Bangladesh) Mohaiman Ashrafee
38	$1,500 Marathon No Limit Hold'em	1,438	(United States) Nick Maimone (1/1)	$302,472	(Brazil) Diego Bittar
39	$25,000 No Limit Hold'em Poker Players Championship	407	(Germany) Christian Rudolph (1/1)	$1,800,290	(United States) Chris Hunichen
40	$50 Big 50	44,576	(China) Huahuan Feng (1/1)	$211,282	(China) Xue Qiao Zhao
41	$1,500 Limit Hold'em Championship	337	(United States) Ajay Chabra (1/1)	$77,475	(Canada) Carter Swidler
42	$1,000 No Limit Hold'em 6-Handed	2,202	(Canada) Jim Lefteruk (1/1)	$299,511	(United Kingdom) Endrit Geci
43	$1,500 Pot Limit Omaha	972	(United States) Thi Truong (1/1)	$215,938	(Italy) Enrico Camosci (1/1)
44	$300 Double Stack No Limit Hold'em	3,552	(Norway) Trygve Leite (1/1)	$130,100	(Italy) Emanuele Monari
45	$400 Forty Stack No Limit Hold'em	4,461	(Lithuania) Gediminas Uselis (1/1)	$227,186	(United Kingdom) Andrew Wilson
46	$5,000 No Limit Hold'em Main Event	5,802	(Bulgaria) Stoyan Madanzhiev (1/1)	$3,904,686	(China) Wenling Gao
47	$1,000 Turbo No Limit Hold'em 6-Handed	1,910	(Finland) Adnan Hacialioglu (1/1)	$259,842	(Sweden) Robin Berggren
48	$25,000 Heads Up No Limit Hold'em	127	(Germany) Fedor Holz (1/2)	$1,077,025	(Brazil) Brunno Botteon
49	$600 No Limit Hold'em 6-Handed	2,408	(United States) Jeffrey Dobrin (1/1)	$189,667	(France) Idris Ambraisse
50	$1,050 Bounty No Limit Hold'em 6-Handed	1,925	(Italy) Nicolo Molinelli (1/1)	$144,199	(Canada) Kyle Menard
51	$1,050 Beat the Pros Bounty	2,024	(Iran) Melika Razavi (1/1)	$151,127	(United States) Dylan Linde
52	$10,000 WSOP Super Million$	899	(United States) Connor Drinan (1/1)	$1,423,049	(Kazakhstan) Daniyar Aubakirov
53	$100 WSOP Million$	34,787	(Norway) Alexander Kobbeltvedt (1/1)	$284,403	(Ukraine) Kostiantyn Vovhcenko
54	$500 The Closer	4,012	(Belgium) Michael Gathy (1/4)	$260,505	(Canada) Yuan Li

=== Main Event ===
The $5,000 No Limit Hold'em Main Event began on August 16 and featured 23 starting flights. Players were allowed to re-enter a maximum of three times. The surviving players from each flight combined for Day 2 on August 30, with the final table being played on September 5.

The Main Event attracted 5,802 players, creating a prize pool of $27,559,500, the largest in online poker history. The winner earned $3,904,686.

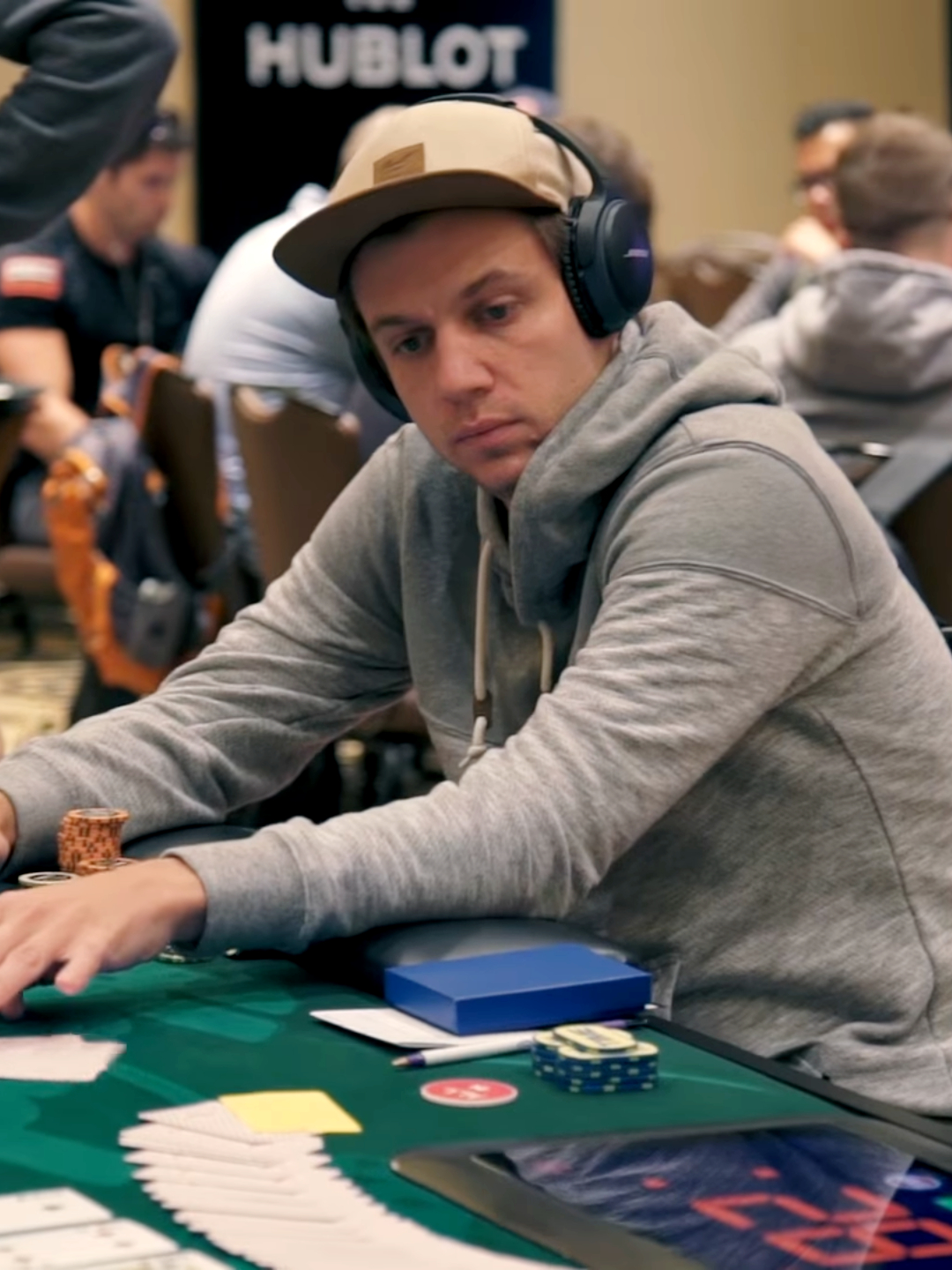
Stefan Schillhabel finished in 7th place

Final table
Name	Number of chips (percentage of total)	WSOP Bracelets	WSOP Cashes*	WSOP Earnings*
(United States) Tyler Rueger	69,761,090 (24.2%)	0	2	$38,997
(Bulgaria) Stoyan Madanzhiev	65,883,013 (22.8%)	0	3	$6,020
(Japan) Satoshi Isomae	36,032,095 (12.5%)	0	3	$43,682
(China) Wenling Gao	34,553,681 (12.0%)	0	0	0
(Brazil) Joao Santos	26,485,618 (9.2%)	0	6	$90,678
(United States) Samuel Taylor	23,408,268 (8.1%)	0	20	$266,124
(United States) Tyler Cornell	12,266,374 (4.2%)	0	24	$401,239
(Germany) Stefan Schillhabel	11,022,052 (3.8%)	0	15	$312,084
(New Zealand) Thomas Ward	9,449,480 (3.3%)	0	14	$86,732

*Career statistics prior to the Main Event

Final table results
Place	Name	Prize
1st	Stoyan Madanzhiev	$3,904,686
2nd	Wenling Gao	$2,748,605
3rd	Tyler Rueger	$1,928,887
4th	Thomas Ward	$1,353,634
5th	Satoshi Isomae	$949,937
6th	Joao Santos	$666,637
7th	Stefan Schillhabel	$467,825
8th	Tyler Cornell	$328,305
9th	Samuel Taylor	$230,395

=== GGPoker Leaderboard ===
Final standings
Rank	Name	Points	Bracelets
1	(Bulgaria) Stoyan Madanzhiev	10,790.66	1
2	(United States) Connor Drinan	9,519.35	1
3	(Germany) Christian Rudolph	7,566.31	1
4	(Canada) Daniel Dvoress	6,513.57	1
5	(Brazil) Brunno Botteon	6,345.54	0
6	(Italy) Enrico Camosci	6,313.36	1
7	(Canada) Alek Stasiak	6,174.40	2
8	(United States) Shankar Pillai	5.759.74	0
9	(Croatia) Ivan Zufic	5,719.69	1
10	(Israel) Ravid Garbi	5,674.97	1
