= Short deck =

Short deck may refer to:

- Short-deck hold 'em, a variant of poker
- Stripped deck, a set of playing cards smaller than a full pack or deck
