= Roberto Romanello =

Welsh poker player

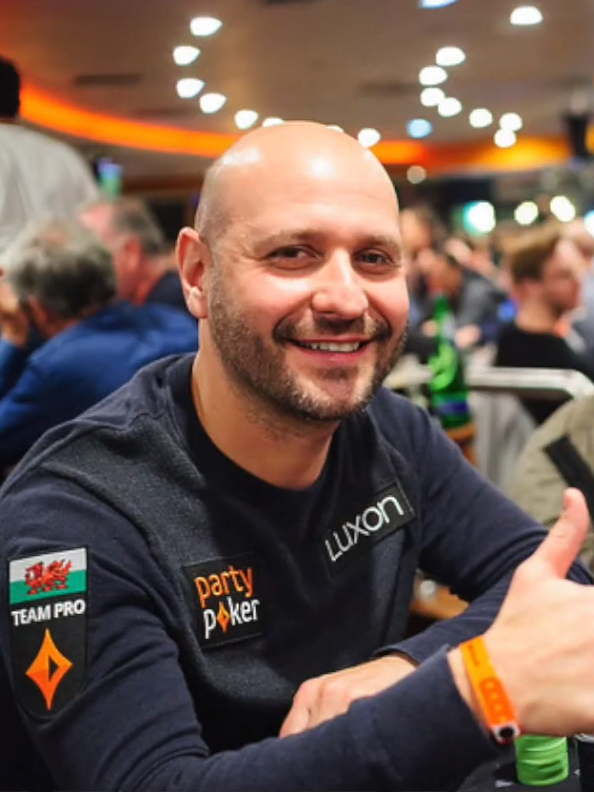
- Romanello in 2019

World Series of Poker
- Bracelet: 1
- Money finishes: 38
- Highest WSOP Main Event finish: 312th, 2006

World Poker Tour
- Title: 1
- Final table: 1
- Money finish: 1

European Poker Tour
- Title: 1
- Final tables: 2
- Money finishes: 5

Roberto Romanello is a Welsh professional poker player from Swansea, Wales. He has made more than $4,000,000 from live tournaments.

Romanello took up poker in 2005 after a sports injury sidelined him for three months. After enjoying watching the World Series of Poker on television, he started to play online and won a World Poker Tour prize package within his first two weeks of playing. After this initial success, Romanello began playing live tournaments at his local casino, in 2006. Also in 2006, he traveled to Las Vegas for his first WSOP Main Event. Romanello performed well, finishing 312th and taking home almost $40,000.

Romanello is one of the most successful Welsh poker players. He is top of the Wales All Time Money List.

In December 2010 he won the European Poker Tour stop in Prague for €640,000. In April 2011 he won the €2,500 buy in World Poker Tour stop at Bratislava in Slovakia with pocket fives.

== World Series of Poker bracelets ==
Year	Tournament	Prize (US$)
2020 O	$1,500 No Limit Hold'em	$216,613

An "O" following a year denotes bracelet(s) won during the World Series of Poker Online
