= Daniel Dvoress =

Canadian poker player (born 1988)

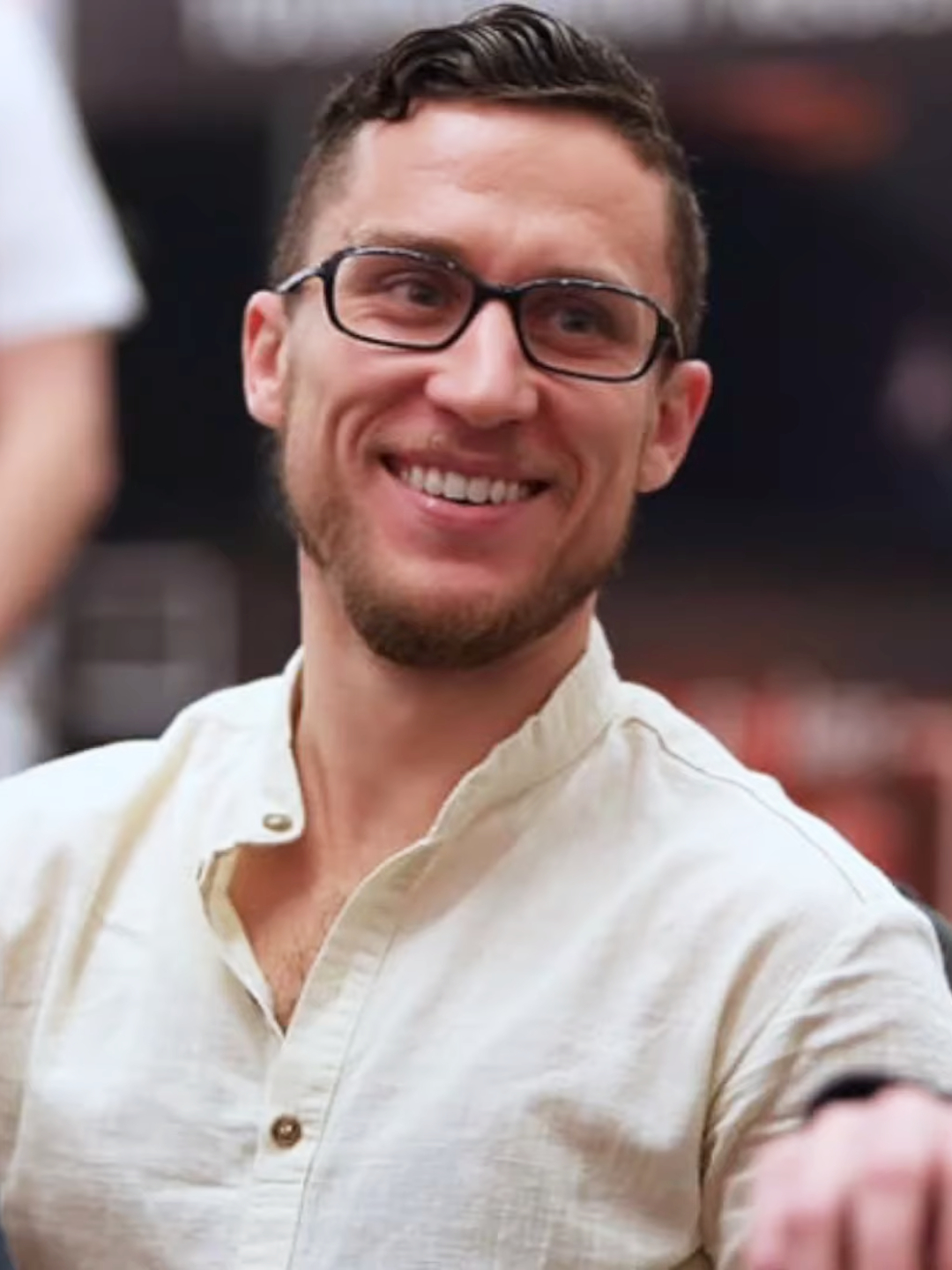
- Daniel Dvoress
- Born: July 12, 1988 (age 38); Soviet Union
- Other names: Oxota; Oxotaments
- Movement: Virtual Training Faculty
World Series of Poker
- Bracelets: 2
- Money finishes: 33
European Poker Tour
- Final table: 1
- Money finishes: 10
- Triton Poker Series
- Titles: 7
- Final tables: 46

Daniel Dvoress (born July 12, 1988) is a Canadian professional poker player. He is one of the top live poker earners from Canada.

== Poker career ==
Dvoress was born in the Soviet Union and emigrated to Canada at the age of 8.

He began playing poker in high school. He started playing online poker in November 2006 under the nicknames "Oxota" on PokerStars and "Oxotaments" on Full Tilt Poker. He turned professional after college mainly focusing on online poker. In May 2014, Dvoress won the PokerStars Spring Championship of Online Poker and receiving US$400,000 US dollars in the process. He has online tournament winnings exceeding $2.6 million.

Dvoress prefers to stay out of the spotlight and is "Vegas-averse". In 2019, he won the $250,000 buy-in no-limit hold’em tournament at the Super High Roller Bowl Bahamas after defeating the Malaysian Wai Chan, winning $4,080,000 in the process.

In August 2020, Dvoress won his first WSOP bracelet in $1,500 Millionaire Maker at the 2020 World Series of Poker Online and received $1,489,289.

As of 2025, Dvoress's total live poker tournament winnings exceed $41,800,000.

World Series of Poker bracelets
Year	Tournament	Prize (US$)
2020O	$1,500 Millionaire Maker	$1,489,289
2023E	€24,600 + 400 No Limit Hold'em - WSOPE GGMillion$	$644,150

An "O" following a year denotes bracelet(s) won during the World Series of Poker Online
An "E" following a year denotes bracelet(s) won during the World Series of Poker Europe

=== Coaching ===
Dvoress was a coach for Phil Galfond’s poker training site RunItOnce.
