= Richard Yong =

Malaysian businessman and poker player (born 1957)

- Born: Seng Chen Yong; 25 December 1957 (age 68); Malaysia

World Series of Poker
- Final tables: 2
- Money finishes: 3

European Poker Tour
- Final tables: 3
- Money finishes: 3
- Triton Poker Series
- Titles: 3
- Battle Royal: 18

Seng Chen "Richard" Yong (born 25 December 1957) is a Malaysian businessman, bookmaker and poker player.

== Career ==
Yong has a career in the information-technology and data-mining industries.

== Poker ==
Yong entered the $1,000,000 Big One for One Drop in the 2012 World Series of Poker. He finished 8th earning $1,237,333. In September 2012, Yong finished runner up to Paul Phua at the Aspers 100K High Roller in London earning him $924,140. He played in the €50,000 Majestic scooter event at the 2012 World Series of Poker Europe finishing in 3rd for $521,859.

In 2014, Yong and his son were arrested for being members of an illegal sports betting ring led by Paul Phua. He posted bail of $1.5 million raised by fellow poker players Dan Cates and Phil Ivey. Yong has alleged business ties to Phua as well as being a gambling partner. Yong pleaded guilty to a misdemeanor charge in December.

In 2015, Yong won his first major tournament the Aussie Millions $100,000 Challenge earning him $1,477,560. Yong outlasted Erik Seidel, Scott Seiver and Ole Schemion.

In May 2018, Yong won the Triton HKD$250,000 6-Max Event which is part of the Super High Roller series in Montenegro. As of 2018, Yong has cashed for over $7,400,000 in live tournaments, making him the Malaysian cash leader.

Yong plays in Macau's biggest cash games.

== Personal life ==
Yong has a son, Wai Kin Yong, who also plays poker.
