= Aaron Zang =

Chinese poker player (born 1982)

- Born: Shu Nu Zang; 21 June 1982 (age 44); China

Aaron Zang (simplified Chinese: 臧书奴; traditional Chinese: 臧書奴; pinyin: Zāng Shūnú; born 21 June 1982) is a Chinese poker player currently residing in Macau. He won the £1,050,000 No Limit Hold'em Triton Million for Charity event in 2019 which has the largest single payout in poker tournament history.

== Poker career ==
Zang got into poker through a friend after he went to university. He regularly deposited money into the partypoker online poker room which he repeatedly gambled away. In 2006, his uncle gave him ¥1,000 which he used to build a bankroll of ¥400,000. In 2007, Zang began playing professionally in Macau.

In 2019, Zang won the £1,050,000 No Limit Hold'em Triton Million defeating Bryn Kenney heads up. The tournament had the largest scheduled single payout in poker tournament history, with first place receiving £19,000,000 ($23,100,000). However, due to a prize splitting deal agreed with Kenney, Zang ended up receiving £13,779,491 ($16,775,820) for first place while Kenney received the larger prize of £16,890,509 ($20,563,324) for finishing runner-up. The deal was made when the tournament entered heads up with Kenney holding an over 5:1 chip lead against Zang. Zang made a comeback and eventually won the tournament. For his victory in the 2019 Triton Million event, Zang received the third largest single payout in poker tournament history behind Kenney's runner-up place prize in the same tournament and Antonio Esfandiari's victory prize at 2012 Big One for One Drop for $18,346,673.

As of August 2020, Zang has won over US$17,600,000 in live poker tournaments, overtaking Elton Tsang as the most successful Chinese poker player in live tournaments. His latest victory coming from Triton Poker Vietnam where he won $1,00,000 in the Short Deck Main Event.

== Personal life ==
Zang played Magic: The Gathering during high school and won a Chinese championship in the card game. He graduated from university in 2005. In 2013, he founded a company specializing in Bitcoin in Shenzhen.

== Prize Money Overview ==
With total tournament earnings of nearly $22 million, Aaron Zang is the most successful Chinese poker player on the All-Time Money List as of March 15, 2023.

Total tournament earnings by Aaron Zang since 2007:

Year	Prize money (in $)	Tournament Wins
2007	1,783	0
2008–2012	0	0
2013	0	1
2014	116,938	0
2015	251,771	0
2016	330,073	0
2017	0	0
2018	156,848	0
2019	19,487,836	1
2020–2022	0	0
2023	1,544,000	1
Total	21,889,249	3
