= Melika Razavi =

Iranian beauty queen, magician and poker player

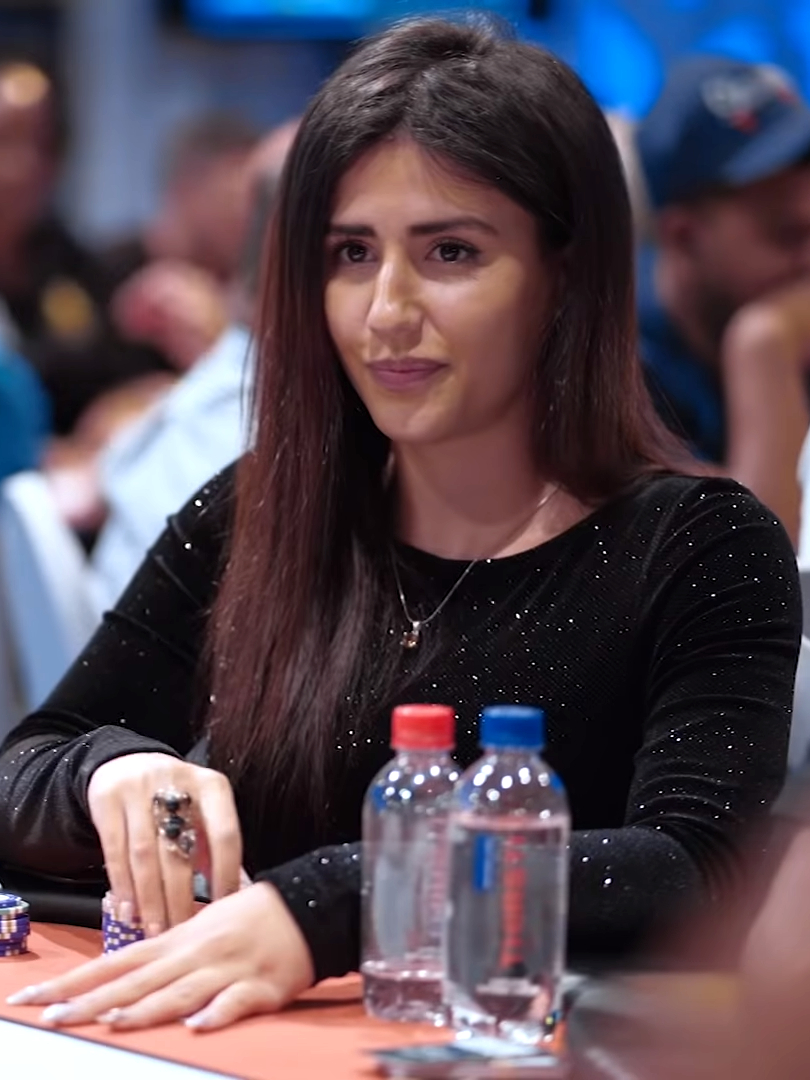
- Razavi at WPTDeepStacks in Johannesburg, 2019
- Born: 26 June 1989 (age 37); Iran

World Series of Poker
- Bracelet: 1
- Highest WSOP Main Event finish: 1st

World Poker Tour
- Final tables: 7th

European Poker Tour
- Final tables: 9th

Melika Sadat Razavi Jamali (born 26 June 1989) is an Iranian-South African beauty queen, magician and professional poker player.

== Biography ==
Melika Sadat Razavi Jamali was born in Iran in 1989 and grew up in South Africa.

Razavi was crowned Miss Iran in 2016, Miss Global Fitness in Manilla, Philippines in 2016 and Miss Power Woman in Punta Cana, Dominican Republic in 2017, despite how gambling, magic and beauty pageants are all banned in Iran.

Razavi is a professional poker player. Her first poker tournament was the 888poker LIVE Barcelona in 2017. She was knocked out of the 2019 European Poker Tour (EPT) Monte Carlo Main Event by Chinese player Wei Huang.

Razavi achieved 1st place and became pro champion in the $1,050 No Limit Beat the Pros Event (Bounty event #82) at the World Series of Poker (WSOP) 2020, winning a bracelet and the grand prize of $239,180. Razavi is the second Iranian player and the third female player to win a WSOP bracelet. At the next day of the tournament, she won a further $80,000 when she finished 13th in the $10,000 No Limit Hold’em Super MILLION$ (Event #83).

In 2022, Razavi participated in the Triton Poker Series in Kyrenia, Northern Cyprus, taking $75,000 in winnings. In 2023, she beat the Paris Saint-Germain FC football player and poker enthusiast Neymar during a high-stakes cash games at Casino Barcelona.

Razavi's Iranian passport disqualifies her from participating in America's poker tournaments.
