= Elton Tsang =

Chinese-Canadian poker player

Elton Tsang Ka-wai (born November 3, 1980) is a Chinese-Canadian entrepreneur, investor, and high-stakes poker player based in Hong Kong. Tsang has built a career that spans investing, poker, philanthropy, and technology.

In poker, Tsang is credited with organizing the first live tournament in Macau — a venture that helped establish the region as a global destination for the game — and later won the 2016 €1,000,000 Monte-Carlo One Drop Extravaganza for €11,111,111, one of the largest single prizes in the history of the sport. Primarily a cash game player, he spent years competing in the private high-stakes games that defined Macau's poker scene before transitioning to the international tournament circuit, where he has accumulated over $16.9 million in cashes on the Triton Super High Roller Series alone.

== Early life and education ==
Tsang was born in Vancouver, British Columbia, to a family with roots in Hong Kong. He attended the University of British Columbia, where he first encountered poker in 2001 through low-stakes online games. What began as a university pastime developed into a lifelong discipline.

== Career ==
=== Bringing poker to Macau ===
After completing his studies, Tsang returned to Hong Kong and identified what he saw as a significant gap in the market: Macau, then rapidly emerging as Asia's premier gaming hub, had no poker offering of any kind. Through a family connection to the Grand Waldo Casino, he secured a meeting, pitched the concept of a live Texas hold 'em tournament, and invested approximately HK$1 million (US$130,000) of his own capital to bring it to life. Working with tournament director Matt Savage and with PokerStars as sponsor, the event became the inaugural stop of the Asia Pacific Poker Tour (APPT) — a landmark development that helped open the Asian market to international poker.

=== Rise through the Macau cash games ===
Rather than follow the tournament circuit, Tsang remained in Macau and committed to cash games — starting at the lowest available stakes of HK$25/$50 (approximately US$3/$6) and building his way up over several years. He has spoken about a formative rivalry with American player John Hoang, known as "Vietnamese John," who repeatedly pushed him back to lower stakes before Tsang eventually prevailed — a period he describes as a turning point in his development.

When Pot-limit Omaha was introduced in Macau, Tsang leveraged his online experience in the format to accelerate his progress, eventually reaching the HK$10,000/$20,000 and HK$20,000/$40,000 private games.

=== The Big Game ===
By the mid-2010s, Tsang had established himself as a regular in what was known as "The Big Game" — the ultra-high-stakes private cash games in Macau that attracted some of the most prominent names in poker, including Phil Ivey, Tom Dwan, Patrik Antonius, Gus Hansen, and Johnny Chan.

In one widely recounted session, Tsang lost HK$60 million (approximately US$7.6 million) over 24 hours of play. At what he described as his stop-limit, he chose to buy in for a final HK$20 million — knowing that losing it would mean returning to lower stakes. He recovered the entire deficit and won an additional HK$60 million on top. "It was the most important game of my life," he later said.

=== Monte-Carlo One Drop Extravaganza (2016) ===
In October 2016, Tsang entered the €1,000,000 Monte-Carlo One Drop Extravaganza, held during the World Series of Poker Europe. Coached by Mustapha Kanit, he navigated a 28-player field that included Rick Salomon, Cary Katz, and Anatoly Gurtovoy, claiming the €11,111,111 first prize — at the time the third-largest single payout in poker tournament history.

=== Triton Super High Roller Series ===
Since 2018, Tsang has been one of the most prominent competitors on the Triton Super High Roller Series,.

After 71 entries and 11 final table appearances, he secured his first Triton title in March 2024 — the $150,000 NLH 8-Handed event in Jeju, South Korea, for $4,210,000. His second title followed in September 2025, winning the $100,000 Short Deck event for $1,697,000.

At Triton Jeju S5 in March 2026, Tsang delivered consecutive third-place finishes in the $100,000 Main Event ($1,787,000, won by Ben Tollerene) and the $150,000 10th Anniversary Special ($1,482,000, won by Paul Phua), earning over $3.2 million across two days.

=== Televised cash games ===
Tsang has appeared in 84 streamed cash game episodes totaling over 180 hours, and has been involved in some of the largest pots in televised poker history, including a €2 million pot against Jason Koon at the 2018 Triton Series in Montenegro.

=== Leon Tsoukernik gambling debt dispute ===
In 2017, Tsang became involved in one of the poker world's most widely discussed disputes when he publicly accused Leon Tsoukernik, the Czech billionaire owner of King's Casino, of refusing to honour approximately €3,365,000 in debts from a private cash game at Casino Barcelona. According to Tsang, Tsoukernik paid only €1,200,000 of his total losses and then characterized the game as "strange," alleging collusion and foul play. As the game had taken place in Europe, where gambling debts carry no legal standing, Tsang was left with no path to recovery.

Several of the game's most respected figures came to Tsang's defence. Daniel Negreanu publicly stated: "Elton is an honorable guy and is not lying." Tony G reportedly stepped in as a mediator between the two parties, and players including Winfred Yu and Philipp Gruissem also voiced their support. The dispute remains one of the most notable unresolved controversies in high-stakes poker.

== Tournament results ==
Date	Country	Event	Place	Prize
Mar 2026	South Korea	$150,000 NLH 10th Anniversary Special — Triton Jeju S5	3rd	$1,482,000
Mar 2026	South Korea	$100,000 NLH Main Event — Triton Jeju S5	3rd	$1,787,000
Mar 2026	South Korea	$50,000 Short Deck PLPF — Triton Jeju S5	6th	$188,000
Sep 2025	South Korea	$200,000 Short Deck PLPF — Triton Jeju II	6th	$754,000
Sep 2025	South Korea	$100,000 Short Deck — Triton Jeju	1st	$1,697,000
Apr 2025	South Korea	KRW 70,000,000 Short Deck — Korea Poker Cup	2nd	$353,200
Nov 2024	Monaco	$25,000 NLH 8-Handed — Triton Monte Carlo	9th	$95,000
May 2024	Montenegro	$50,000 NLH 8-Handed — Triton Montenegro	21st	$87,500
Mar 2024	South Korea	$100,000 NLH — Triton Jeju	3rd	$2,105,000
Mar 2024	South Korea	$150,000 NLH 8-Handed — Triton Jeju	1st	$4,210,000
Oct 2023	Monaco	$210,000 NLH Invitational — Triton Monte Carlo	3rd	$1,780,000
Oct 2023	Monaco	$106,000 NLH 8-Handed — Triton Monte Carlo	10th	$240,000
Jul 2023	England	$40,000 NLH Mystery Bounty — Triton London	15th	$42,600
May 2023	Cyprus	$25,000 NLH Turbo — Triton Cyprus	9th	$59,100
Oct 2022	Vietnam	VND 70,000,000 NLH — Poker Dream Vietnam	3rd	$27,298
May 2022	Spain	€30,000 Short Deck Turbo — Triton Madrid	2nd	$244,650
May 2022	Spain	€50,000 Short Deck — Triton Madrid	4th	$317,100
Apr 2022	Cyprus	$50,000 NLH — SHRS Europe #8	1st	$684,000
Apr 2022	Cyprus	$75,000 Short Deck — Triton Cyprus #5	4th	$343,000
Apr 2022	Cyprus	$75,000 Short Deck — Triton Cyprus #3	4th	$408,000
Apr 2022	Cyprus	$100,000 NLH — Triton Cyprus #2	9th	$192,000
Apr 2022	Cyprus	$50,000 NLH 6-Max — Triton Cyprus #1	6th	$240,100
Aug 2019	England	£100,000 Short Deck Main Event — Triton London	14th	$215,365
Oct 2016	Monaco	€1,000,000 Monte-Carlo One Drop Extravaganza	1st	€11,111,111
Apr 2013	Australia	A$50,000 NLH High Roller — WSOP Asia-Pacific	5th	$162,212
Jan 2012	Australia	A$10,600 NLH Main Event — Aussie Millions	21st	$46,326
Mar 2011	Philippines	$2,700 NLH Main Event — APT Philippines	2nd	$95,230
Nov 2010	Macau	HK$35,000 NLH Main Event — APT Macau	7th	$26,059
Apr 2010	Macau	HK$8,000 NLH Main Event — Asian Poker King Tournament	1st	$71,307
Jan 2008	Bahamas	$8,000 NLH — PokerStars Caribbean Adventure	37th	$32,000

== Philanthropy ==
Tsang is actively involved in charitable work across Hong Kong and mainland China. His 2016 One Drop victory contributed to raising over €3.1 million for the One Drop Foundation, which supports clean water access in developing countries, with €111,111 from each of the 28 buy-ins going directly to the foundation's global projects.

In Hong Kong, Tsang has donated to Mother's Choice, the Po Leung Kuk orphanage, and the Lord Grace Home for the Aged. He credits Sheen Hok Charitable Foundation founder Alice Chiu as an inspiration, saying: "My passion for charitable work originates from Alice Chiu ... I was deeply touched by her efforts to help the needy in the society. Earlier, I visited children with amblyopia in Handan, China. The experience taught me to be grateful for all I have, and do my best to help those in need."

== Personal life ==
Tsang is based in Hong Kong and maintains ties to Vancouver, Canada. He is a father and has spoken about the role of family in shaping his values and perspective. Outside of poker, Tsang identifies primarily as an entrepreneur and investor, with a focus on investing, technology, and philanthropy.
