= Sosia Jiang =

New Zealand poker player (born 1979)

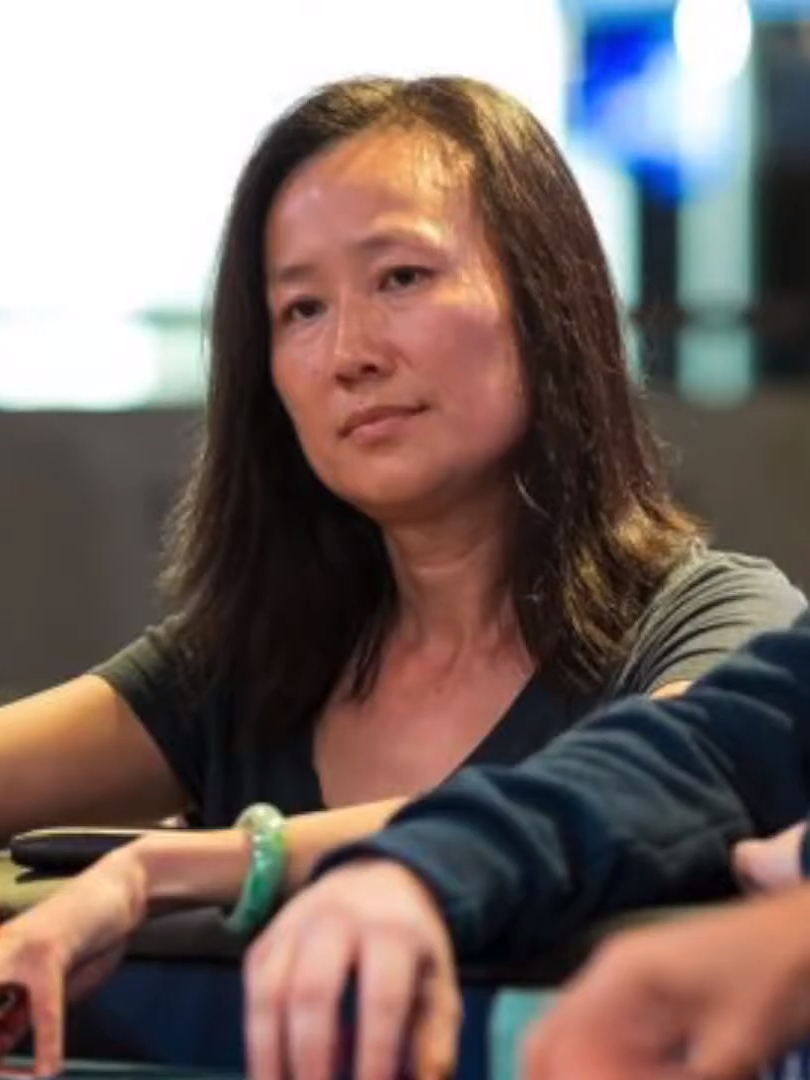
- Born: 1979; Inner Mongolia

Sosia Jiang (born 1979 in Inner Mongolia) is a New Zealand-Chinese poker player.

== Early life ==
Jiang came to New Zealand as a 7 year old, coming from the Chinese autonomous region of Inner Mongolia, where her family had been forced to live due to "unfavourable" status with the Chinese government. Jiang would often play card games with her family.

After being rejected by Epsom Girls' Grammar School, Jiang would be accepted into Diocesan School for Girls. She would then go on to study at the Australian National University, obtaining a double degree in commerce and Asian studies, before entering a graduate law program at the University of New South Wales. Afterwards, she would work at multiple brokerage firms. In 2008, while working for CLSA in Hong Kong, Jiang was introduced to poker when her boss invited her to play, around this time she was introduced to online poker by her brother Honglin. Jiang would go on to run CLSA's Shanghai office. Jiang moved back to New Zealand in 2013 to become a teacher.

== Poker ==
In March 2017, Jiang participation in the Macau Poker Cup, one month later, she won the 2017 PokerStars Championship High Roller event in Macau, eliminating Dan Smith, Nick Petrangelo, and Sergey Lebedev, among others, and winning the equivalent of 500 thousand USD in prize money. The next year, she won the Sydney Championships High Roller, winning 266 thousand Australian dollars.

As of 2024, her live tournament winnings are almost $3 million.
