= Mario Mosböck =

Austrian footballer

Personal information
- Date of birth: 7 May 1996 (age 30)
- Place of birth: Austria
- Height: 1.82 m (5 ft 11 1/2 in)
- Position: Forward

Youth career
- –2014: SKN St. Pölten U18

Senior career*
Years	Team	Apps	(Gls)
2014–2017	SKN St. Pölten II	48	(21)
2015–2017	SKN St. Pölten	18	(1)
2017	SC Wiener Neustadt	2	(0)
- * Club domestic league appearances and goals as of 22 September 2017

Mario Mosböck (born 7 May 1996) is an Austrian footballer who last played as a forward for SC Wiener Neustadt.

== Personal life ==
As of April 2026 Mario has $17,700,000 in Poker Earnings.
