= Mikita Badziakouski =

Belarusian poker player (born 1992)

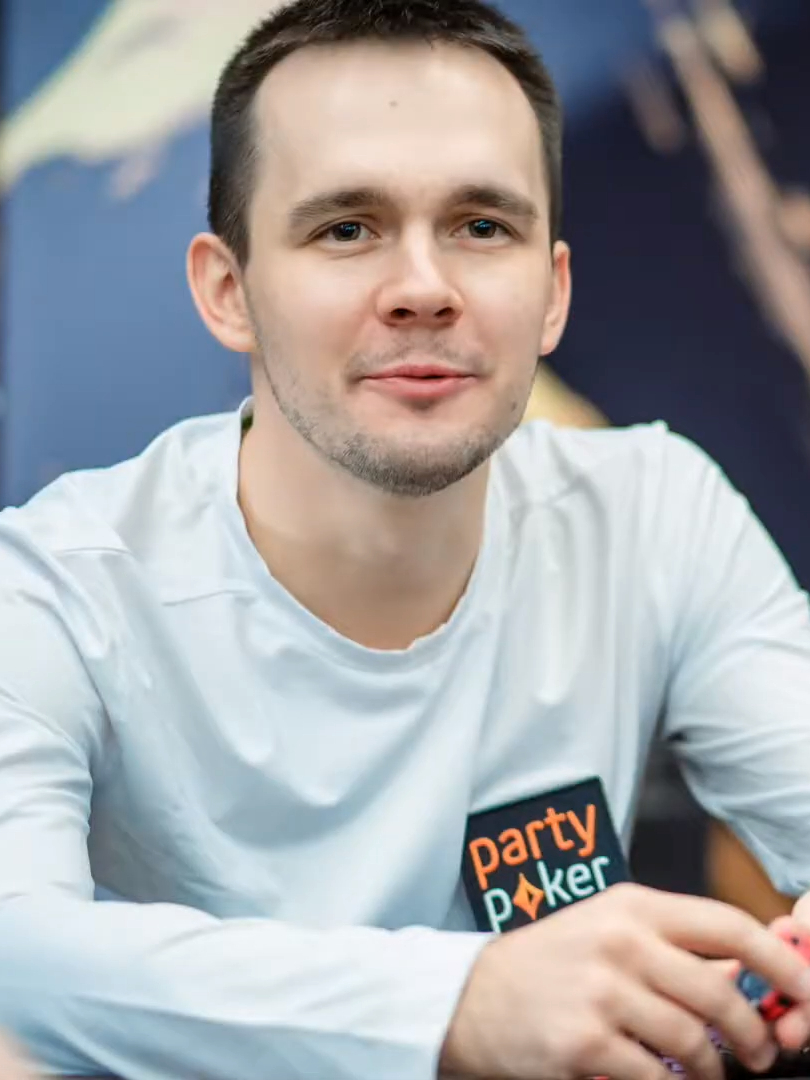
- Badziakouski in 2020
- Nickname: fish2013
- Born: 6 February 1992 (age 34)

World Series of Poker
- Bracelet: 1
- Final tables: 5
- Money finishes: 5

European Poker Tour
- Title: 1
- Final tables: 6
- Money finishes: 15

Mikita Badziakouski (Belarusian: Мікіта Бадзякоўскі, Russian: Никита Бодяковский, romanized: Nikita Bodyakovskiy; born 6 February 1992) is a Belarusian professional poker player known for his accomplishments in live poker tournaments.

== Poker career ==
Badziakouski began playing live tournaments in 2010, at the age of 18.

Badziakouski plays online poker under the alias fish2013 on PokerStars'’. He chose the number 2013 in his screen name because that was the year he would turn 21 and be able to play for a WSOP title in America.

In May 2018, Badziakouski won the Triton Super High Roller Series Montenegro festival held at the Maestral Resort & Casino, winning $2,499,090 in the process. In August, he won the 2018 EPT Barcelona €100,000 Super High Roller, his fourth title of the year, winning him $1,930,851.

After winning the short deck hold 'em event held at King's Casino Rozvadov in October 2018, Badziakouski was dubbed the "Short Deck Poker king".

In September 2019, Mikita Badziakouski lost the £50,000 NLHE at the British Poker Open 2019. Mikita defeated Cristoph Vogelsang Heads-Up To Earn £486,000.

As of February 2020, Badziakouski has earned over $2,200,000 playing high stakes online cash games on PokerStars. He has earned over $50,000,000 from live poker tournaments. In December 2023, he won the $1 million Big One for One Drop tournament at the WPT World Championship at the Wynn in Las Vegas, winning over $7 million. He is the all-time money leader in Belarus.

=== World Series of Poker ===
Bracelets
Year	Event	Prize
2021	$50,000 No Limit Hold'em - High Roller	$1,462,043

=== Triton Poker Series ===
Festival	Tournament	Prize
Montenegro 2018	1M HKD Main Event	HKD 19,618,400
Jeju 2018	2M HKD Main Event	HKD 41,250,000
Montenegro 2019	750K HKD Short Deck Ante-Only	HKD 13,300,000
Madrid 2022	€50k NLH 7-Handed	€ 1,340,000
Jeju 2024	$100k Short Deck	$1,153,000

=== Poker GO Tour Titles ===
Year	Tournament	Prize
2021	Poker Masters #10 - $25,000 NLH	$342,000
2021	WSOP #85 - $50,000 High Roller NLH	$1,462,043
2022	SHRS Europe #2 - $50k Short Deck	$756,000
	CCSU $20 Re-Buy	$520
2022	Triton Madrid #6 - €50k NLH	$1,340,000
2025	ARIA High Roller #10 - $15,100 No-Limit Hold'em	$250,000
