= Six-plus hold 'em =

Community card poker game

- Alternative names: Short-deck hold 'em
- Type: Community card poker
- Players: 2+
- Skills: Probability, psychology
- Cards: 36
- Deck: French
- Rank (high→low): A K Q J 10 9 8 7 6 (A when used in a Straight)
- Play: Clockwise
- Chance: High

Six-plus hold 'em (also known as short-deck hold 'em and Manila) is a community card poker game variant of Texas hold 'em, where the 2 through 5 cards are removed from the deck. Each player is dealt two cards face down and seeks to make the best five card poker hand from any combination of the seven cards (five community cards and their own two hole cards).

== Rules ==
The rules in terms of betting structures, play of the hand, and showdown are the same as in Texas hold 'em. However, before play begins all cards 2 through 5 are removed (16 cards), thus the total number of cards in the deck is 36. Aces are high, but same as in Texas hold 'em, can make both low and high end of straights. For example, the lowest straight would be (9x-8x-7x-6x-Ax) and the highest (Ax-Kx-Qx-Jx-10x). This changes the probability of hands and alters hand rankings.

=== Modified hand rankings ===
Rank	Name	Example
1	Royal flush	Ace of spades King of spades Queen of spades Jack of spades 10 of spades
2	Straight flush	Jack of clubs 10 of clubs 9 of clubs 8 of clubs 7 of clubs
3	Four of a kind	King of clubs King of diamonds King of hearts King of spades 6 of diamonds
4	Flush^{†}	Jack of diamonds 9 of diamonds 8 of diamonds Ace of diamonds 6 of diamonds
5	Full house^{†}	6 of spades 6 of hearts 6 of diamonds King of clubs King of hearts
6	Straight^{‡}	9 of diamonds 8 of spades 7 of hearts 6 of diamonds Ace of clubs
7	Three of a kind^{‡}	Queen of clubs Queen of spades Queen of hearts 9 of hearts 6 of spades
8	Two pair	Jack of hearts Jack of spades Queen of clubs Queen of spades 7 of hearts
9	One pair	10 of spades 10 of hearts 8 of spades 7 of hearts Ace of clubs
10	High card	King of diamonds Queen of diamonds 7 of spades 8 of spades 6 of hearts

^{†} Flush ranks higher than full house, since the reduced amount of ranks makes flushes harder and full houses easier to hit.

^{‡} In theory, three-of-a-kind would rank higher than a straight as the probability of achieving three-of-a-kind is lower than a straight in short-deck for the 7-card hands dealt in Texas hold 'em. However, when calculating for a six-plus poker where each player gets only 5 cards, straights rank higher than three-of-a-kind, and this is how it's ranked in most games.

^{†} ^{‡} Some variations of six-plus hold 'em are played with standard Texas hold 'em hand rankings.

== History ==
6-Plus is a variation of the game, Manila (created in 2010 or prior), A once popular game in Australia and among high stakes gamblers in Asia.

In 2015, Phil Ivey and Tom Dwan promoted the game in an online video showing this variant of Texas hold 'em which is frequently played in Macau, Hong Kong and Manila.

The 2018 Triton Poker tournament series hosted the first televised six-plus hold 'em tournaments. The first Triton Super High Roller HK$250,000 short deck ante-only event was won by Phil Ivey, earning him US$617,396.
