= 2014 World Series of Poker results =

Below are the results of the 2014 World Series of Poker, held from May 27-July 14 at the Rio All Suite Hotel and Casino in Paradise, Nevada.

== Key ==
*	Elected to the Poker Hall of Fame
(#/#)	This denotes a bracelet winner. The first number is the number of bracelets won in the 2014 WSOP. The second number is the total number of bracelets won. Both numbers represent totals as of that point during the tournament.
Place	What place each player at the final table finished
Name	The player who made it to the final table
Prize (US$)	The amount of money awarded for each finish at the event's final table

== Results ==
=== Event #1: $500 Casino Employees No Limit Hold'em ===
- 3-Day Event: May 27–29
- Number of Entries: 876
- Total Prize Pool: $394,200
- Number of Payouts: 90
- Winning Hand: A♠ Q♠

Final Table
Place	Name	Prize
1st	Roland Reparejo (1/1)	$82,835
2nd	Corey Emery	$51,037
3rd	Charles Nguyen	$33,073
4th	Olivier Doremus	$24,203
5th	John Taylor	$17,975
6th	Brian Wong	$13,528
7th	Marcin Sobczak	$10,308
8th	David Luttbeg	$7,947
9th	Kevin Chiem	$6,192

=== Event #2: $25,000 Mixed Max No Limit Hold'em ===
- 4-Day Event: May 27–30
- Number of Entries: 131
- Total Prize Pool: $3,111,250
- Number of Payouts: 16
- Winning Hand: K♥ J♣

Final Table
Place	Name	Prize
1st	Vanessa Selbst (1/3)	$871,148
2nd	Jason Mo	$538,308
SF	Al Decarolis	$290,622
SF	J.C. Tran (0/2)	$290,622

=== Event #3: $1,000 Pot Limit Omaha ===
- 3-Day Event: May 28–30
- Number of Entries: 1,128
- Total Prize Pool: $1,015,200
- Number of Payouts: 117
- Winning Hand: A♣ K♥ K♣ 5♠

Final Table
Place	Name	Prize
1st	Brandon Shack-Harris (1/1)	$205,634
2nd	Morgan Popham	$127,245
3rd	Iori Yogo	$79,611
4th	Steve Billirakis (0/2)	$57,785
5th	Matthew Ryan	$42,658
6th	Robert Paddock	$31,978
7th	Patrick Arena	$24,324
8th	Loren Klein	$18,750
9th	Nick Guagenti	$14,649

=== Event #4: $1,000 No Limit Hold'em ===
- 3-Day Event: May 29–31
- Number of Entries: 2,223
- Total Prize Pool: $2,000,700
- Number of Payouts: 243
- Winning Hand: A♣ Q♦

Final Table
Place	Name	Prize
1st	Kyle Cartwright (1/1)	$360,278
2nd	Jason Paster	$223,418
3rd	Ylon Schwartz (0/1)	$157,855
4th	Daniel Dizenzo	$113,499
5th	Matt O'Donnell	$82,688
6th	Jeremy Dresch	$61,041
7th	Robert Kuhn	$45,635
8th	Ken Weinstein	$34,552
9th	Michael Sortino	$26,489

=== Event #5: $10,000 Limit 2-7 Triple Draw Lowball ===
- 3-Day Event: May 29–31
- Number of Entries: 120
- Total Prize Pool: $1,128,000
- Number of Payouts: 12
- Winning Hand: 9-6-4-3-2

Final Table
Place	Name	Prize
1st	Tuan Le (1/1)	$355,324
2nd	Justin Bonomo	$219,565
3rd	Eli Elezra (0/2)	$144,056
4th	Nick Schulman (0/2)	$99,015
5th	George Danzer	$70,308
6th	Phil Galfond (0/1)	$51,538

=== Event #6: $1,500 No Limit Hold'em Shootout ===
- 3-Day Event: May 30-June 1
- Number of Entries: 948
- Total Prize Pool: $1,279,800
- Number of Payouts: 120
- Winning Hand: K♦ 8♠

Final Table
Place	Name	Prize
1st	Alex Bolotin (1/1)	$259,211
2nd	Dimitar Danchev	$160,410
3rd	Jon Lane	$100,239
4th	Josh Arieh (0/2)	$72,846
5th	Steven Loube (0/1)	$53,777
6th	Douglas Foster	$40,314
7th	David Trager	$30,664
8th	Shawn Busse (0/1)	$23,638
9th	Maxx Coleman	$18,468

=== Event #7: $1,500 Seven Card Razz ===
- 3-Day Event: May 30-June 1
- Number of Entries: 352
- Total Prize Pool: $475,200
- Number of Payouts: 40
- Winning Hand: 9-3-A-6-7-6-A

Final Table
Place	Name	Prize
1st	Ted Forrest (1/6)	$121,196
2nd	Phil Hellmuth* (0/13)	$74,848
3rd	Greg Pappas	$48,275
4th	David Bach (0/1)	$34,979
5th	Brock Parker (0/2)	$25,717
6th	Brandon Cantu (0/2)	$19,183
7th	Yuebin Guo	$14,517
8th	Kevin Iacofano	$11,143

=== Event #8: $1,500 Millionaire Maker No Limit Hold'em ===
- 4-Day Event: May 31-June 3
- Number of Entries: 7,977
- Total Prize Pool: $10,768,950
- Number of Payouts: 819
- Winning Hand: 6♥ 2♥

Final Table
Place	Name	Prize
1st	Jonathan Dimmig (1/1)	$1,319,587
2nd	Jeffrey Coburn	$815,963
3rd	James Duke	$614,368
4th	Andrew Teng	$465,972
5th	Bradley Anderson	$355,913
6th	Stephen Graner	$273,854
7th	Jason Johnson	$211,394
8th	Andrew Dick	$164,118
9th	Maurice Hawkins	$128,150

=== Event #9: $1,000 No Limit Hold'em ===
- 3-Day Event: June 1–3
- Number of Entries: 1,940
- Total Prize Pool: $1,746,000
- Number of Payouts: 198
- Winning Hand: A♦ 9♥

Final Table
Place	Name	Prize
1st	Jeff Smith (1/1)	$323,125
2nd	Danny Nguyen	$199,829
3rd	Frank Patti	$138,160
4th	John Fontana	$99,644
5th	Chris Haugo	$72,843
6th	Chris Hunichen	$53,951
7th	Brad Libson	$40,489
8th	David Inselberg	$30,781
9th	Jorge Vergara	$23,693

=== Event #10: $10,000 Limit Omaha Hi-Low Split-8 or Better ===
- 3-Day Event: June 1–3
- Number of Entries: 178
- Total Prize Pool: $1,673,200
- Number of Payouts: 18
- Winning Hand: 6♥ 5♦ 4♣ 2♦

Final Table
Place	Name	Prize
1st	Brock Parker (1/3)	$443,407
2nd	Richard Ashby (0/1)	$274,019
3rd	Ofir Mor	$198,508
4th	Shirley Rosario	$146,522
5th	Viatcheslav Ortynskiy	$110,113
6th	Jason McPherson	$84,195
7th	Steve Lustig	$65,472
8th	Melissa Burr	$51,768
9th	Dan Kelly (0/1)	$41,595

=== Event #11: $1,500 No Limit Hold'em Six Handed ===
- 3-Day Event: June 2–4
- Number of Entries: 1,587
- Total Prize Pool: $2,142,450
- Number of Payouts: 162
- Winning Hand: 10♥ 3♥

Final Table
Place	Name	Prize
1st	Justin Bonomo (1/1)	$449,980
2nd	Mike Sowers	$278,518
3rd	Daniel Strelitz	$180,587
4th	Lance Harris	$119,977
5th	Niel Mittelman	$80,341
6th	Taylor Paur (0/1)	$55,703

=== Event #12: $1,500 Pot Limit Hold'em ===
- 3-Day Event: June 3–5
- Number of Entries: 557
- Total Prize Pool: $751,950
- Number of Payouts: 63
- Winning Hand: J♣ 3♠

Final Table
Place	Name	Prize
1st	Gregory Kolo (1/1)	$169,225
2nd	Kazu Oshima	$104,513
3rd	Dean Bui	$74,134
4th	David Martirosyan	$53,328
5th	Tom McCormick	$38,898
6th	Dan Goldman	$28,769
7th	Ahmed Amin	$21,565
8th	Ryan Schoonbaert	$16,384
9th	Phil Collins	$12,610

=== Event #13: $10,000 No Limit 2-7 Draw Lowball ===
- 3-Day Event: June 3–5
- Number of Entries: 87
- Total Prize Pool: $817,800
- Number of Payouts: 14
- Winning Hand: J-10-7-6-3

Final Table
Place	Name	Prize
1st	Paul Volpe (1/1)	$253,524
2nd	Daniel Negreanu (0/6)	$156,674
3rd	Jason Mercier (0/2)	$99,313
4th	Brian Rast (0/2)	$67,264
5th	Larry Wright (0/1)	$47,792
6th	John Monnette (0/2)	$35,549
7th	Abe Mosseri (0/1)	$27,633

=== Event #14: $1,500 Limit Omaha Hi-Low Split-8 or Better ===
- 3-Day Event: June 4–6
- Number of Entries: 1,036
- Total Prize Pool: $1,398,600
- Number of Payouts: 117
- Winning Hand: A♠ K♥ 9♦ Q♦

Final Table
Place	Name	Prize
1st	Nick Kost (1/1)	$283,275
2nd	Kal Raichura	$175,300
3rd	Jim Bucci	$109,678
4th	Calen McNeil (0/1)	$79,608
5th	Alex Luneau	$58,769
6th	Steve Chanthabouasy	$44,055
7th	Greg Raymer (0/1)	$33,510
8th	Adam Coats	$25,832
9th	Konstantin Puchkov (0/1)	$20,181

=== Event #15: $3,000 No Limit Hold'em Six Handed ===
- 4-Day Event: June 5–8
- Number of Entries: 810
- Total Prize Pool: $2,211,300
- Number of Payouts: 90
- Winning Hand: A♦ K♥

Final Table
Place	Name	Prize
1st	Davidi Kitai (1/3)	$508,640
2nd	Gordon Vayo	$314,535
3rd	Tony Ruberto	$200,476
4th	Mark Darner	$132,169
5th	John Andress	$89,734
6th	Zachary Korik	$62,690

=== Event #16: $1,500 Limit 2-7 Triple Draw Lowball ===
- 3-Day Event: June 5–7
- Number of Entries: 348
- Total Prize Pool: $469,800
- Number of Payouts: 36
- Winning Hand: 10-8-5-4-2

Final Table
Place	Name	Prize
1st	Todd Bui (1/1)	$124,510
2nd	Tom Franklin (0/1)	$76,943
3rd	David Bell	$49,944
4th	Vladimir Shchemelev (0/1)	$33,388
5th	Aaron Steury (0/1)	$22,935
6th	David Gee	$16,170

=== Event #17: $1,000 Seniors No Limit Hold'em Championship ===
- 3-Day Event: June 6–8
- Number of Entries: 4,425
- Total Prize Pool: $3,982,500
- Number of Payouts: 468
- Winning Hand: 6♣ 2♥

Final Table
Place	Name	Prize
1st	Dan Heimiller (1/2)	$627,462
2nd	Donald Maas	$388,054
3rd	David Smith	$279,412
4th	Anthony Wise	$206,492
5th	Dennis Phillips	$153,883
6th	David Tran	$115,651
7th	Barry Schwartz	$87,615
8th	David Vida	$66,945
9th	Jim Custer	$51,573

=== Event #18: $10,000 Seven Card Razz ===
- 3-Day Event: June 6–8
- Number of Entries: 112
- Total Prize Pool: $1,052,800
- Number of Payouts: 16
- Winning Hand: 6♣ 2♠ K♥ J♣ 5♣ 4♥ A♥

Final Table
Place	Name	Prize
1st	George Danzer (1/1)	$294,792
2nd	Brandon Shack-Harris (1/1)	$182,155
3rd	Todd Barlow	$114,081
4th	Yuval Bronshtein	$82,602
5th	Brian Hastings (0/1)	$64,557
6th	Todd Dakake	$51,481
7th	Naoya Kihara (0/1)	$41,806
8th	David Bach (0/1)	$34,500

=== Event #19: $1,500 No Limit Hold'em ===
- 3-Day Event: June 7–9
- Number of Entries: 2,086
- Total Prize Pool: $2,816,100
- Number of Payouts: 216
- Winning Hand: A♠ 6♥

Final Table
Place	Name	Prize
1st	Ted Gillis (1/1)	$514,027
2nd	John Hennigan (0/2)	$319,993
3rd	Dejan Divkovic	$222,429
4th	Jacobo Fernandez	$160,193
5th	Mustapha Kanit	$117,079
6th	Jaime Kaplan	$86,609
7th	Hiren Patel	$64,911
8th	Edison Shields	$49,267
9th	Dylan Thomassie	$37,834

=== Event #20: $3,000 No Limit Hold'em Shootout ===
- 3-Day Event: June 7–9
- Number of Entries: 389
- Total Prize Pool: $1,061,970
- Number of Payouts: 40
- Winning Hand: A♥ J♠

Final Table
Place	Name	Prize
1st	Kory Kilpatrick (1/1)	$254,891
2nd	Eric Wasserson	$157,490
3rd	Noah Bronstein	$115,659
4th	Jack Duong	$85,616
5th	Chris Bell (0/1)	$63,877
6th	Phil Galfond (0/1)	$48,043
7th	Taylor Paur (0/1)	$36,414
8th	Michael Stonehill	$27,812
9th	Dylan Linde	$21,409
10th	Narendra Banwari	$16,609

=== Event #21: $1,000 No Limit Hold'em ===
- 3-Day Event: June 8–10
- Number of Entries: 2,043
- Total Prize Pool: $1,838,700
- Number of Payouts: 216
- Winning Hand: K♦ 6♥

Final Table
Place	Name	Prize
1st	Dominik Nitsche (2/3)	$335,659
2nd	Dave D'Alesandro	$208,931
3rd	Bob Bounahra	$145,229
4th	Zachary Gruneberg	$104,594
5th	Thayer Rasmussen	$76,443
6th	Jeff Gross	$56,549
7th	Eric Milas	$42,382
8th	Billy Horan	$32,168
9th	David Burt	$24,702

=== Event #22: $10,000 H.O.R.S.E. ===
- 3-Day Event: June 8–10
- Number of Entries: 200
- Total Prize Pool: $1,880,000
- Number of Payouts: 24
- Winning Hand: 2♦ 3♥ 5♦ 2♣ 2♥ Q♦ 3♣ (Stud 8)

Final Table
Place	Name	Prize
1st	Christopher Wallace (1/1)	$507,614
2nd	Randy Ohel (0/1)	$313,715
3rd	Richard Sklar	$206,499
4th	Richard Ashby (0/1)	$150,625
5th	Max Pescatori (0/2)	$112,066
6th	Lee Goldman	$84,844
7th	Bill Chen (0/2)	$65,273
8th	Calvin Anderson	$50,966

=== Event #23: $1,000 Turbo No Limit Hold'em ===
- 2-Day Event: June 9–10
- Number of Entries: 1,473
- Total Prize Pool: $1,325,700
- Number of Payouts: 171
- Winning Hand: 9♥ 7♦

Final Table
Place	Name	Prize
1st	Doug Polk (1/1)	$251,969
2nd	Andy Philachack	$155,756
3rd	Jonathan Hanner	$102,503
4th	Chad Cox	$73,894
5th	Liam Alcock	$54,088
6th	Anthony Gregg (0/1)	$40,168
7th	Gianluca Cedolia	$30,252
8th	Dash Dudley	$23,093
9th	Andrew Mackenzie	$17,857

=== Event #24: $5,000 No Limit Hold'em Six Handed ===
- 4-Day Event: June 10–13
- Number of Entries: 541
- Total Prize Pool: $2,542,700
- Number of Payouts: 60
- Winning Hand: K♣ 9♣

Final Table
Place	Name	Prize
1st	Kevin Eyster (1/1)	$622,998
2nd	Pierre Neuville	$385,041
3rd	Andrew Lichtenberger	$242,827
4th	Bryn Kenney	$160,927
5th	Jeremy Kottler	$109,844
6th	David Borrat	$77,145

=== Event #25: $2,500 Omaha/Seven Card Stud HI-Low Split-8 or Better ===
- 3-Day Event: June 10–12
- Number of Entries: 470
- Total Prize Pool: $1,069,250
- Number of Payouts: 48
- Winning Hand: A♦ J♣ 9♣ 7♦ Q♣ 7♣ 6♥

Final Table
Place	Name	Prize
1st	John Kabbaj (1/2)	$267,327
2nd	Thomas Keller (0/1)	$165,177
3rd	Christopher McHugh	$105,000
4th	Terrence Hastoo	$75,713
5th	Joe Tehan	$55,451
6th	Erik Seidel* (0/8)	$41,230
7th	Mike Leah	$31,115
8th	Tom Schneider (0/4)	$23,833

=== Event #26: $1,500 No Limit Hold'em ===
- 3-Day Event: June 11–13
- Number of Entries: 1,594
- Total Prize Pool: $2,151,900
- Number of Payouts: 171
- Winning Hand: 6♣ 6♥

Final Table
Place	Name	Prize
1st	Andrew Rennhack (1/1)	$408,953
2nd	Michael Katz	$252,826
3rd	Tony Gargano	$166,384
4th	Ryan Welch (0/1)	$119,946
5th	Reed Goodmiller	$87,797
6th	Heinz Kamutzki	$65,202
7th	Geremy Eiland	$49,106
8th	Eric Rappaport	$37,486
9th	Dan Smith	$28,986

=== Event #27: $1,500 H.O.R.S.E. ===
- 3-Day Event: June 12–14
- Number of Entries: 743
- Total Prize Pool: $1,003,050
- Number of Payouts: 80
- Winning Hand: Q♥ J♣ (Hold'em)

Final Table
Place	Name	Prize
1st	Tommy Hang (1/1)	$230,744
2nd	Jim Collopy (0/1)	$142,533
3rd	Kristan Lord	$96,894
4th	Brandon Guss	$67,435
5th	Joe Villella	$47,905
6th	Chris George	$34,725
7th	Stewart Yancik	$25,668
8th	David Baker (0/1)	$19,338

=== Event #28: $10,000 Pot Limit Hold'em ===
- 3-Day Event: June 12–14
- Number of Entries: 160
- Total Prize Pool: $1,504,000
- Number of Payouts: 18
- Winning Hand: Q♦ J♦

Final Table
Place	Name	Prize
1st	Alex Bilokur (1/1)	$398,567
2nd	Matt O'Donnell	$246,310
3rd	Alexander Venovski	$178,434
4th	David Rheem	$131,705
5th	Ismael Bojang	$98,978
6th	Todd Brunson (0/1)	$75,681
7th	Pratyush Buddiga	$58,851
8th	Richard Lyndaker	$46,533
9th	Barny Boatman (0/1)	$37,389

=== Event #29: $2,500 No Limit Hold'em ===
- 3-Day Event: June 13–15
- Number of Entries: 1,165
- Total Prize Pool: $2,650,375
- Number of Payouts: 117
- Winning Hand: 10♦ 8♦

Final Table
Place	Name	Prize
1st	Pierre Milan (1/1)	$536,768
2nd	Justin Oliver (0/1)	$332,198
3rd	Matt Salsberg	$207,842
4th	Thad McNulty	$150,859
5th	Barry Hutter	$111,368
6th	Jamie Armstrong	$83,486
7th	Andy Phan	$63,502
8th	Daniel Laming	$48,952
9th	Sam Cohen	$38,244

=== Event #30: $1,500 Seven Card Stud Hi-Low 8-or Better ===
- 3-Day Event: June 13–15
- Number of Entries: 588
- Total Prize Pool: $793,800
- Number of Payouts: 64
- Winning Hand: 8♦ 4♥ 6♥ 8♣ 5♥ 4♣ Q♦

Final Table
Place	Name	Prize
1st	Calvin Anderson (1/1)	$190,538
2nd	Joe Tehan	$118,014
3rd	Eric Kurtzman	$79,800
4th	Levon Torosyan	$55,319
5th	Melissa Burr	$39,181
6th	Sanjay Pandya	$28,346
7th	Jimmy Fricke	$20,932
8th	John Myung	$15,772

=== Event #31: $1,500 No Limit Hold'em ===
- 3-Day Event: June 14–16
- Number of Entries: 1,631
- Total Prize Pool: $2,201,850
- Number of Payouts: 171
- Winning Hand: A♠ 2♦

Final Table
Place	Name	Prize
1st	Brett Shaffer (1/2)	$418,435
2nd	R.J. Sullivan	$258,695
3rd	Matt Stout	$170,247
4th	Peter Gould	$122,731
5th	Aleksandr Gofman	$89,835
6th	Robert Schmidt	$66,716
7th	Rob Wazwaz	$50,246
8th	Jim Jakobsen	$38,356
9th	Jason Vanstrom	$29,658

=== Event #32: $10,000 No Limit Hold'em Six Handed ===
- 3-Day Event: June 14–16
- Number of Entries: 264
- Total Prize Pool: $2,481,600
- Number of Payouts: 30
- Winning Hand: Q♥ Q♣

Final Table
Place	Name	Prize
1st	Joe Cada (1/2)	$670,041
2nd	Jeremy Ausmus (0/1)	$414,104
3rd	Max Silver	$273,646
4th	J.C. Tran (0/2)	$185,971
5th	Erick Lindgren (0/2)	$129,192
6th	Dario Sammartino	$91,670

=== Event #33: $1,000 No Limit Hold'em ===
- 3-Day Event: June 15–17
- Number of Entries: 1,688
- Total Prize Pool: $1,519,200
- Number of Payouts: 171
- Winning Hand: A♥ 4♠

Final Table
Place	Name	Prize
1st	Dutch Boyd (1/3)	$288,744
2nd	Steven Norden	$178,490
3rd	Paul Cogliano	$117,464
4th	Will Givens	$84,680
5th	Pok Kim	$61,983
6th	Christopher Sensoli	$46,031
7th	Vinny Pahuja	$34,668
8th	Gabriel Nassif	$26,464
9th	Chad Dixon	$20,463

=== Event #34: $1,500 Seven Card Stud ===
- 3-Day Event: June 15–17
- Number of Entries: 345
- Total Prize Pool: $465,750
- Number of Payouts: 40
- Winning Hand: J♥ 10♣ 10♥ 10♠ 6♦ 6♣ 4♥

Final Table
Place	Name	Prize
1st	Eric Buchman (1/2)	$118,785
2nd	Alex Kravchenko (0/1)	$73,360
3rd	Aleksandr Denisov	$47,315
4th	William Thompson	$34,283
5th	Bryn Kenney	$25,206
6th	Nabih Helmi	$18,802
7th	Mallory Smith	$14,228
8th	David Prager	$10,921

=== Event #35: $5,000 No Limit Hold'em Eight Handed ===
- 3-Day Event: June 16–18
- Number of Entries: 550
- Total Prize Pool: $2,585,000
- Number of Payouts: 56
- Winning Hand: 8♦ 2♦

Final Table
Place	Name	Prize
1st	Brian Yoon (1/2)	$633,341
2nd	Josh Arieh (0/2)	$391,575
3rd	Josh Bergman	$246,169
4th	Ardit Kurshumi	$176,684
5th	Mustapha Kanit	$128,862
6th	Dan Smith	$95,515
7th	Timo Pfutzenreuter	$71,940
8th	Tony Cousineau	$55,034

=== Event #36: $1,500 No Limit 2-7 Draw Lowball ===
- 3-Day Event: June 16–18
- Number of Entries: 241
- Total Prize Pool: $325,350
- Number of Payouts: 28
- Winning Hand: 9-8-7-5-2

Final Table
Place	Name	Prize
1st	Steven Wolansky (1/1)	$89,483
2nd	Joseph Cheong	$55,309
3rd	Max Kruse	$36,494
4th	Christopher Mecklin	$24,908
5th	Orjan Skommo	$17,445
6th	Samuel Touil	$12,529
7th	Scott Bohlman	$9,223

=== Event #37: $1,500 Pot Limit Omaha ===
- 3-Day Event: June 17–19
- Number of Entries: 967
- Total Prize Pool: $1,305,450
- Number of Payouts: 117
- Winning Hand: A♠ A♣ 8♠ K♦

Final Table
Place	Name	Prize
1st	Brandon Paster (1/1)	$264,400
2nd	Marcel Vonk (0/1)	$163,625
3rd	Gabriel Nassif	$102,373
4th	Matthew Humphrey	$74,306
5th	Matthew Dames	$54,855
6th	Millard Hale	$41,121
7th	Dmitrii Valouev	$31,278
8th	Kevin Saul	$24,111
9th	Galen Hall	$18,837

=== Event #38: $10,000 Seven Card Stud Hi-Low Split-8 or Better ===
- 3-Day Event: June 17–19
- Number of Entries: 134
- Total Prize Pool: $1,259,600
- Number of Payouts: 16
- Winning Hand: 8♦ K♦ 9♦ J♣ K♣ 3♣ 2♣

Final Table
Place	Name	Prize
1st	George Danzer (2/2)	$352,696
2nd	John Racener	$217,935
3rd	Calvin Anderson (1/1)	$136,490
4th	Brian Hastings (0/1)	$98,828
5th	Jeff Lisandro (0/5)	$77,238
6th	Chris George	$61,594
7th	David Singer (0/1)	$50,018
8th	John Monnette (0/2)	$41,277

=== Event #39: $3,000 No Limit Hold'em ===
- 4-Day Event: June 18–21
- Number of Entries: 992
- Total Prize Pool: $2,708,160
- Number of Payouts: 117
- Winning Hand: J♦ J♣

Final Table
Place	Name	Prize
1st	Sean Dempsey (1/1)	$548,460
2nd	Ryan Jaconetti	$339,440
3rd	Jacob Schindler	$212,373
4th	Ryan Olisar	$154,148
5th	Ryan Laplante	$113,796
6th	Nam Le	$85,307
7th	Layne Flack (0/6)	$64,887
8th	Takashi Yagura	$50,019
9th	Andrew Becker	$39,078

=== Event #40: $10,000 Heads Up No Limit Hold'em ===
- 3-Day Event: June 19–21
- Number of Entries: 136
- Total Prize Pool: $1,198,400
- Number of Payouts: 16
- Winning Hand: A♠ 10♦

Final Table
Place	Name	Prize
1st	Davide Suriano (1/1)	$335,553
2nd	Sam Stein (0/1)	$207,347
SF	Daniel Colman	$111,942
SF	Scott Davies	$111,942
QF	Scott Baumstein	$54,736
QF	Ankush Mandavia	$54,736
QF	Tommy Chen	$54,736
QF	Dee Tiller	$54,736

=== Event #41: $1,500 Dealer's Choice Six Handed ===
- 3-Day Event: June 19–21
- Number of Entries: 419
- Total Prize Pool: $565,650
- Number of Payouts: 42
- Winning Hand: A-2-3-5-6 (A-5 Triple Draw)

Final Table
Place	Name	Prize
1st	Robert Mizrachi (1/2)	$147,092
2nd	Aaron Schaff	$90,854
3rd	Shane Abbott	$58,414
4th	Bill Chen (0/2)	$38,735
5th	Daniel Idema (0/2)	$26,444
6th	Frank Kassela (0/2)	$18,575

=== Event #42: $5,000 Pot Limit Omaha Six Handed ===
- 3-Day Event: June 20–22
- Number of Entries: 452
- Total Prize Pool: $2,124,400
- Number of Payouts: 48
- Winning Hand: 8♦ 7♣ 4♦ 4♥

Final Table
Place	Name	Prize
1st	Michael Drummond (1/1)	$541,747
2nd	Darius Studdard	$334,593
3rd	Kory Kilpatrick (1/1)	$217,113
4th	Ryan Schmidt	$143,397
5th	Brant Hale	$95,598
6th	Phil Laak (0/1)	$66,918

=== Event #43: $1,500 Limit Hold'em ===
- 3-Day Event: June 20–22
- Number of Entries: 657
- Total Prize Pool: $886,950
- Number of Payouts: 72
- Winning Hand: J♠ 10♦

Final Table
Place	Name	Prize
1st	Dan Kelly (1/2)	$195,167
2nd	Yegor Tsurikov	$120,501
3rd	Brandon Shack-Harris (1/1)	$78,335
4th	Sean Berrios	$57,536
5th	Jesse Katz	$42,857
6th	David Chiu (0/5)	$32,338
7th	Jeff Lisandro (0/5)	$24,683
8th	Bryce Landier	$19,051
9th	Ron Burke	$14,856

=== Event #44: $1,500 No Limit Hold'em ===
- 4-Day Event: June 21–24
- Number of Entries: 1,914
- Total Prize Pool: $2,583,900
- Number of Payouts: 198
- Winning Hand: 6♦ 6♣

Final Table
Place	Name	Prize
1st	Jordan Morgan (1/1)	$478,102
2nd	Evan McNiff	$295,727
3rd	Jason Johnson	$204,464
4th	Ray Foley (0/1)	$147,463
5th	Bryan Dillon	$107,800
6th	Robert Chorlian	$79,842
7th	Joseph Iarussi	$59,920
8th	Ryan Spittles	$45,554
9th	Michael Anselm	$35,063

=== Event #45: $1,000 No Limit Hold'em ===
- 3-Day Event: June 22–24
- Number of Entries: 1,841
- Total Prize Pool: $1,656,900
- Number of Payouts: 198
- Winning Hand: K♠ J♣

Final Table
Place	Name	Prize
1st	Will Givens (1/1)	$306,634
2nd	Angela Prada-Moed	$189,632
3rd	Paul Sokoloff	$131,110
4th	David Hass	$94,559
5th	Patrick Curzio	$69,125
6th	Duy Ho	$51,198
7th	Dmitrii Shchepkin	$38,423
8th	Ivan Saul	$29,211
9th	Loren Klein	$22,484

=== Event #46: $50,000 The Poker Players Championship ===
- 5-Day Event: June 22–26
- Number of Entries: 102
- Total Prize Pool: $4,896,000
- Number of Payouts: 14
- Winning Hand: A♥ 10♦ (No Limit Hold'em)

Final Table
Place	Name	Prize
1st	John Hennigan (1/3)	$1,517,767
2nd	Brandon Shack-Harris (1/1)	$937,975
3rd	Jesse Martin (0/1)	$594,570
4th	Abe Mosseri (0/1)	$402,696
5th	Chun Lei Zhou	$286,122
6th	Frank Kassela (0/2)	$212,829
7th	Melissa Burr	$165,435

=== Event #47: $1,500 Ante Only No Limit Hold'em ===
- 3-Day Event: June 23–25
- Number of Entries: 714
- Total Prize Pool: $963,900
- Number of Payouts: 72
- Winning Hand: A♦ A♣

Final Table
Place	Name	Prize
1st	Jesse McEuen (1/1)	$212,093
2nd	Jonas Lauck	$130,955
3rd	Rhys Jones	$85,131
4th	Simeon Naydenov (0/1)	$62,528
5th	Adam Levy	$46,575
6th	Ryan D'Angelo	$35,143
7th	Herbert Yarbrough	$26,825
8th	Jeremy Joseph	$20,704
9th	Arthur Pro	$16,145

=== Event #48: $1,500 Pot Limit Omaha Hi-Low Split-8 or Better ===
- 3-Day Event: June 24–26
- Number of Entries: 991
- Total Prize Pool: $1,337,850
- Number of Payouts: 117
- Winning Hand: A♠ 9♣ 8♣ 3♠

Final Table
Place	Name	Prize
1st	Tyler Patterson (1/1)	$270,992
2nd	Scott Clements (0/2)	$167,686
3rd	Cody Crawford	$104,914
4th	Jeff Madsen (0/3)	$76,150
5th	Gary Kosakowski	$56,216
6th	Tom Schneider (0/4)	$42,142
7th	Derek Raymond (0/1)	$32,054
8th	J.R. Flournoy	$24,710
9th	Dylan Wilkerson	$19,305

=== Event #49: $5,000 No Limit Hold'em ===
- 4-Day Event: June 25–28
- Number of Entries: 696
- Total Prize Pool: $3,271,200
- Number of Payouts: 72
- Winning Hand: 7♠ 7♥

Final Table
Place	Name	Prize
1st	David Miscikowski (1/1)	$719,707
2nd	Norbert Szecsi (0/1)	$444,425
3rd	Manig Löser	$288,912
4th	Margareta Morris	$212,202
5th	Oliver Price	$158,064
6th	Kevin MacPhee	$119,267
7th	Jean Gaspard	$91,037
8th	John Dolan	$70,265
9th	Blake Bohn	$54,792

=== Event #50: $1,500 Eight Game Mix ===
- 3-Day Event: June 25–27
- Number of Entries: 485
- Total Prize Pool: $654,750
- Number of Payouts: 49
- Winning Hand: A♣ K♠ 9♣ 8♠ (Omaha-8)

Final Table
Place	Name	Prize
1st	Phil Ivey (1/10)	$166,986
2nd	Bruce Yamron	$103,162
3rd	Dan Heimiller (1/2)	$66,110
4th	Aaron Steury (0/1)	$44,195
5th	Stephen Chidwick	$30,426
6th	Yuebin Guo	$21,547
7th	Christoph Haller	$15,687

=== Event #51: $1,500 No Limit Hold'em Monster Stack ===
- 5-Day Event: June 26–30
- Number of Entries: 7,862
- Total Prize Pool: $10,613,700
- Number of Payouts: 792
- Winning Hand: A♣ K♦

Final Table
Place	Name	Prize
1st	Hugo Pingray (1/1)	$1,327,083
2nd	Joe McKeehen	$820,863
3rd	Sean Drake (0/1)	$619,521
4th	Claas Segebrecht	$468,594
5th	Thayer Rasmussen	$356,620
6th	Lynne Beaumont	$273,090
7th	Bobby Byram	$210,469
8th	Zachary Gruneberg	$163,238
9th	Joshua Hillock	$127,364

=== Event #52: $10,000 Limit Hold'em ===
- 3-Day Event: June 26–28
- Number of Entries: 122
- Total Prize Pool: $1,146,800
- Number of Payouts: 18
- Winning Hand: 9♥ 9♦

Final Table
Place	Name	Prize
1st	David Olson (1/1)	$303,909
2nd	Mikail Tulchinskiy	$187,811
3rd	Greg DeBora	$136,056
4th	Samuel Golbuff	$100,425
5th	Paul Mannoni	$75,470
6th	Bill Chen (0/2)	$57,706
7th	Brian Tate	$44,874
8th	Jan Sjavik	$35,481
9th	Gabriel Nassif	$28,509

=== Event #53: $10,000 Ladies No Limit Hold'em Championship ===
- 3-Day Event: June 27–29
- Number of Entries: 793
- Total Prize Pool: $713,700
- Number of Payouts: 81
- Winning Hand: A♠ 6♠

Final Table
Place	Name	Prize
1st	Haixia Zhang (1/1)	$153,470
2nd	Mikiyo Aoki	$94,800
3rd	Meikat Siu	$61,114
4th	Elizabeth Montizanti	$44,770
5th	Patty Landis	$33,279
6th	Persia Bonella	$25,072
7th	Kendra Wray	$19,120
8th	Stacey Sullivan	$14,752
9th	Patricia Cahill	$11,504

=== Event #54: $3,000 Pot Limit Omaha Hi-Low Split-8 or Better ===
- 3-Day Event: June 27–29
- Number of Entries: 474
- Total Prize Pool: $1,294,020
- Number of Payouts: 54
- Winning Hand: A♣ 6♥ 10♠ 8♣

Final Table
Place	Name	Prize
1st	Florian Langmann (1/1)	$297,650
2nd	Zach Freeman	$184,216
3rd	Dylan Wilkerson	$122,427
4th	Doug Baughman	$90,853
5th	T.J. Eisenman	$68,181
6th	Antony Lellouche	$51,670
7th	Woody Deck	$39,506
8th	Jonathan Depa	$30,448
9th	Shiva Dudani	$23,641

=== Event #55: $1,500 No Limit Hold'em ===
- 3-Day Event: June 28–30
- Number of Entries: 2,396
- Total Prize Pool: $3,234,600
- Number of Payouts: 243
- Winning Hand: 6♣ 5♣

Final Table
Place	Name	Prize
1st	Asi Moshe (1/1)	$582,321
2nd	Michael Ferrer	$361,207
3rd	Aaron Massey	$255,209
4th	David Jackson	$183,498
5th	Bobby Poe	$133,686
6th	Henrik Hecklen	$98,687
7th	Marc Etienne McLaughlin	$73,781
8th	Tim West	$55,861
9th	Brian Kennedy	$42,826

=== Event #56: $1,000 No Limit Hold'em ===
- 3-Day Event: June 29-July 1
- Number of Entries: 2,525
- Total Prize Pool: $2,272,500
- Number of Payouts: 270
- Winning Hand: J♥ 6♦

Final Table
Place	Name	Prize
1st	Mike Kachan (1/1)	$403,483
2nd	Jeff Blenkarn	$250,815
3rd	Eric Shanks	$177,527
4th	Andrew Egan	$128,032
5th	Viktor Skoldstedt	$93,490
6th	Neo Hoang	$69,084
7th	Steve Gross (0/1)	$51,676
8th	Richard Milne	$39,109
9th	Ray Henson	$29,951

=== Event #57: $1,000,000 The Big One for One Drop ===
- 3-Day Event: June 29-July 1
- Number of Entries: 42
- Total Prize Pool: $37,333,338
- Number of Payouts: 8
- Winning Hand: K♦ Q♥

Final Table
Place	Name	Prize
1st	Daniel Colman (1/1)	$15,306,668
2nd	Daniel Negreanu (0/6)	$8,288,001
3rd	Christoph Vogelsang	$4,480,001
4th	Rick Salomon	$2,800,000
5th	Tobias Reinkemeier	$2,053,334
6th	Scott Seiver (0/1)	$1,680,000
7th	Paul Newey	$1,418,667
8th	Cary Katz	$1,306,667

=== Event #58: $1,500 No Limit Hold'em Mixed Max ===
- 3-Day Event: June 30-July 2
- Number of Entries: 1,475
- Total Prize Pool: $1,991,250
- Number of Payouts: 162
- Winning Hand: A♣ 6♣

Final Table
Place	Name	Prize
1st	Jared Jaffee (1/1)	$405,428
2nd	Mike Watson	$246,068
SF	Mark Herm	$126,882
SF	Joseph Alban	$126,882

=== Event #59: $3,000 Omaha Hi-Low Split-8 or Better ===
- 3-Day Event: June 30-July 2
- Number of Entries: 457
- Total Prize Pool: $1,247,610
- Number of Payouts: 54
- Winning Hand: J♣ 10♥ 9♦ 7♠

Final Table
Place	Name	Prize
1st	Phil Hui (1/1)	$286,976
2nd	Zack Milchman	$177,609
3rd	Michael Bees	$118,036
4th	Ismael Bojang	$87,594
5th	John D'Agostino	$65,736
6th	David Williams (0/1)	$49,817
7th	Matt Glantz	$38,089
8th	Jordan Morgan (1/1)	$29,356
9th	Joe Mitchell	$22,793

=== Event #60: $1,500 No Limit Hold'em ===
- 4-Day Event: July 1–4
- Number of Entries: 2,563
- Total Prize Pool: $3,460,050
- Number of Payouts: 270
- Winning Hand: Q♥ 10♥

Final Table
Place	Name	Prize
1st	Salman Jaddi (1/1)	$614,248
2nd	Brandon Hall	$381,885
3rd	Zachary Gruneberg	$270,299
4th	Guillaume Marechal	$194,939
5th	Cherish Andrews	$142,346
6th	David Bravin	$105,185
7th	Thomas Dietl	$78,681
8th	Steve Sung (0/2)	$59,547
9th	Kurt Jewell	$45,603

=== Event #61: $10,000 Seven Card Stud ===
- 3-Day Event: July 1–3
- Number of Entries: 102
- Total Prize Pool: $958,800
- Number of Payouts: 16
- Winning Hand: 10♦ 8♥ 8♠ 9♦ J♦ K♦ 4♣

Final Table
Place	Name	Prize
1st	Matt Grapenthien (1/1)	$268,473
2nd	Todd Brunson (0/1)	$165,891
3rd	James Obst	$103,895
4th	Ben Yu	$75,227
5th	Steve Landfish	$58,793
6th	Phil Hellmuth* (0/13)	$46,885
7th	Henrik Hecklen	$38,073
8th	Henry Orenstein* (0/1)	$31,419

=== Event #62: $1,111 The Little One for One Drop ===
- 5-Day Event: July 2–6
- Number of Entries: 4,496
- Total Prize Pool: $4,046,400
- Number of Payouts: 468
- Winning Hand: 6♥ 5♥

Final Table
Place	Name	Prize
1st	Igor Dubinskyy (1/1)	$637,539
2nd	Theodore Driscoll	$394,281
3rd	Brandon Eisen	$283,895
4th	Shai Zurr	$209,805
5th	Eric Baldwin (0/1)	$156,352
6th	Jack Duong	$117,507
7th	Matthew Lapossie	$89,020
8th	Vimy Ha	$68,019
9th	Bao Nguyen	$52,400

=== Event #63: $1,500 10-Game Mix Six Handed ===
- 3-Day Event: July 2–4
- Number of Entries: 445
- Total Prize Pool: $600,750
- Number of Payouts: 48
- Winning Hand: 10♠ 9♥ (No Limit Hold'em)

Final Table
Place	Name	Prize
1st	Bryn Kenney (1/1)	$153,220
2nd	Jan Suchanek	$94,618
3rd	Fabio Coppola	$61,396
4th	Daniel Zack	$40,550
5th	Andrey Zaichenko	$27,033
6th	Randy Ohel (0/1)	$18,923

=== Event #64: $10,000 Pot Limit Omaha ===
- 3-Day Event: July 3–5
- Number of Entries: 418
- Total Prize Pool: $3,929,200
- Number of Payouts: 45
- Winning Hand: J♣ 10♥ 4♥ 3♣

Final Table
Place	Name	Prize
1st	Pat Walsh (1/1)	$923,379
2nd	Javed Abrahams	$570,284
3rd	Miltiadis Kyriakides	$412,408
4th	Isaac Baron	$301,369
5th	Marko Neumann	$222,549
6th	Matt Marafioti	$166,087
7th	Michael Shklover	$125,223
8th	Michal Maryska	$95,361
9th	Jonas Entin	$73,358

=== Event #65: $10,000 No Limit Hold'em Main Event ===
- 10-Day Event: July 5–14
- Final Table: November 10–11
- Number of Entries: 6,683
- Total Prize Pool: $62,820,200
- Number of Payouts: 693
- Winning Hand: 10♥ 10♦

Final Table
Place	Name	Prize
1st	Martin Jacobson (1/1)	$10,000,000
2nd	Felix Stephensen	$5,147,911
3rd	Jorryt van Hoof	$3,807,753
4th	William Tonking	$2,849,763
5th	William Pappaconstantinou	$2,143,794
6th	Andoni Larrabe	$1,622,471
7th	Dan Sindelar	$1,236,084
8th	Bruno Politano	$947,172
9th	Mark Newhouse	$730,725

=== Other High Finishes ===
NB: This list is restricted to top 30 finishers with an existing Wikipedia entry.

Place	Name	Prize
10th	Luis Velador	$656,193
20th	Dan Smith	$286,900
