= List of largest poker tournaments in history (by prize pool) =

For the last several years, the largest tournament in the world has been the World Series of Poker Main Event. With the exception of 1992, the US$10,000 buy-in tournament increased in prize pool year-over-year from its start in 1970 until 2007 (the latter a result of the Unlawful Internet Gambling Enforcement Act of 2006, which reduced the number of players winning their seats via online play).

The first tournament to reach a million dollar prize pool was the 1983 WSOP Main Event. The WSOP Main Event of 2004 had the first prize pool of above $10,000,000.

The largest non Hold'em Tournament has been the 2008 WSOP $50K HORSE with a prize pool of $7,104,000 and the first prize of $1,989,120 going to Scotty Nguyen.

Below are the largest poker tournaments with respect to the prize pool in United States dollars and not number of entrants. This list includes live and online poker.

Currently, 19 of the 21 largest prize pools in history have been WSOP Main Events. Other two tournament to complete this TOP 21 is Triton Super High Roller Series - Triton Million (2019).

All of the 90 richest tournaments to date were played in No Limit Hold'em with more than $15,000,000 prize pool or player prize.

Event	Prize pool (US$)	Winner	1st prize	Ref.
2024 WSOP Main Event	$94,041,600	(United States) Jonathan Tamayo	$10,000,000	
2023 WSOP Main Event	$93,399,900	(United States) Daniel Weinman	$12,100,000	
2025 WSOP Main Event	$90,535,500	(United States) Michael Mizrachi	$10,000,000	
2026 WSOP Main Event	$85,634,400	(United States) Lucas Jumalon	$10,000,000	
2006 WSOP Main Event	$82,512,162	(United States) Jamie Gold	$12,000,000	
2022 WSOP Main Event	$80,782,475	(Norway) Espen Jørstad	$10,000,000	
2019 WSOP Main Event	$80,548,600	(Germany) Hossein Ensan	$10,000,000	
2018 WSOP Main Event	$74,015,600	(United States) John Cynn	$8,800,000	
2025 WSOP Paradise - Super Main Event	$72,275,000	(Austria) Bernhard Binder	$10,000,000	
2010 WSOP Main Event	$68,799,059	(Canada) Jonathan Duhamel	$8,944,310	
2017 WSOP Main Event	$67,877,400	(United States) Scott Blumstein	$8,150,000	
2019 Triton Super High Roller Series - Triton Million	$65,660,000 (£54,000,000)	(China) Aaron Zang	$16,775,820* (£13,779,491)	
2019 Triton Super High Roller Series - Triton Million	$65,660,000 (£54,000,000)	(United States) Bryn Kenney*	$20,563,324* (£16,775,820) (2nd place)	
2011 WSOP Main Event	$64,531,000	(Germany) Pius Heinz	$8,711,956	
2008 WSOP Main Event	$64,333,600	(Denmark) Peter Eastgate	$9,152,416	
2016 WSOP Main Event	$63,327,800	(Vietnam) Qui Nguyen	$8,005,310	
2014 WSOP Main Event	$62,820,200	(Sweden) Martin Jacobson	$10,000,000	
2012 WSOP Main Event	$62,021,200	(United States) Greg Merson	$8,527,982	
2021 WSOP Main Event	$62,011,250	(Germany) Koray Aldemir	$8,000,000	
2009 WSOP Main Event	$61,043,600	(United States) Joe Cada	$8,547,042	
2015 WSOP Main Event	$60,348,000	(United States) Joe McKeehen	$7,680,021	
2007 WSOP Main Event	$59,784,954	(Laos) Jerry Yang	$8,250,000	
2013 WSOP Main Event	$59,708,800	(United States) Ryan Riess	$8,359,531	
2005 WSOP Main Event	$52,818,610	(Australia) Joe Hachem	$7,500,000	
2024 WSOP Paradise - Super Main Event	$48,500,000	(China) Yinan Zhou	$6,000,000	
2024 WSOP Paradise - Triton Million	$44,603,000	(Argentina) Alejandro Lococo	$12,070,000	
2012 WSOP Event 55 – The Big One for One Drop	$42,666,672	(United States) Antonio Esfandiari	$18,346,673	
2023 WPT Championship	$40,000,000	(United States) Daniel Sepiol	$5,282,954	
2014 WSOP Event 57 – The Big One for One Drop	$37,333,338	(United States) Dan Colman	$15,306,668	
2026 Triton Poker Super High Roller Series Jeju	$34,600,000	(Brazil) Joao Simao	$7,250,000	
2025 WSOP Paradise - Triton Million	$33,250,000	(Norway) Kayhan Roshanfekr	$7,725,000	
2023 Triton Poker Super High Roller Series London	$29,500,000	(United States) Bryn Kenney	$6,860,000	
2022 WPT Championship	$29,008,000	(Canada) Eliot Hudon	$4,136,000	
2023 WSOP Online co-hosted by GGPoker	$28,609,250	(Belgium) Bert Stevens	$2,783,433	
2025 Triton Poker Super High Roller Series Jeju	$28,500,000	(China) Wen Huang	$5,555,000	
2025 WSOP Online co-hosted by GGPoker	$28,314,750	(Germany) Benjamin Rolle	$3,900,707	
2020 WSOP Online co-hosted by GGPoker	$27,559,500	(Bulgaria) Stoyan Madanzhiev	$3,904,686	
2016 Monte-Carlo One Drop Extravaganza	$27,437,564	(Canada) Elton Tsang	$12,248,912	
2026 Triton Poker Super High Roller Series Montenegro	$27,400,000	(Spain) Adrián Mateos	$6,370,000	
2025 Triton Poker Super High Roller Series Montenegro	$26,600,000	(Montenegro) Aleksa Pavicevic	$6,180,000	
2019 PSPC PokerStars Players Championship	$26,455,500	(Spain) Ramon Colillas	$5,100,000	
2023 PSPC PokerStars Players Championship	$24,843,000	(Belarus) Aliaksandr Shylko	$3,121,839	
2018 WSOP Event 78 – The Big One for One Drop	$24,840,000	(United States) Justin Bonomo	$10,000,000	
2004 WSOP Main Event	$24,224,400	(United States) Greg Raymer	$5,000,000	
2025 WSOP Paradise - Triton Main Event	$23,700,000	(Latvia) Aleksejs Ponakovs	$4,750,000	
2022 WSOP Online co-hosted by GGPoker (International)	$23,674,000	(Sweden) Simon Mattsson	$2,793,575	
2012 Macau High Stakes Challenge Super High Roller	$23,511,128	(China) Stanley Choi	$6,465,560	
2024 WPT Championship	$23,441,600	(United States) Scott Stewart	$2,563,900	
2022 Triton Poker Super High Roller Series Cyprus	$23,000,000	(United States) Sam Grafton	$5,500,000	
2025 Triton Poker Super High Roller Series Jeju	$22,800,000	(Germany) Christoph Vogelsang	$4,099,975	
2024 Triton Poker Super High Roller Series Jeju	$21,600,000	(Czech Republic) Roman Hrabec	$4,330,000	
2015 Super High Roller Bowl I	$21,500,000	(United States) Brian Rast	$7,525,000	
2018 partypoker Millions Online	$21,385,000	(Netherlands) Manuel Ruivo	$2,329,944	
2024 Triton Poker Super High Roller Series Montenegro	$21,375,000	(Belarus) Mikalai Vaskaboinikau	$4,737,000	
2019 Triton Poker Super High Roller Series London	$21,168,355 (£17,507,500)	(United States) John Patgorski	$5,821,826 (£4,815,000)	
2019 partypoker Millions Online	$21,090,000	(France) Benjamin Chalot	$2,259,113	
2024 Triton Poker Super High Roller Series Monte Carlo	$20,400,000	(Finland) Patrik Antonius	$5,130,000	
2021 WSOP Online co-hosted by GGPoker (International)	$20,000,000	(Russia) Aleksei Vandyshev	$2,543,073	
2024 Triton Poker Super High Roller Series Monte Carlo	$19,875,000	(United States) Bryn Kenney	$4,410,000	
2026 Triton Poker Super High Roller Series Jeju	$19,600,000	(United States) Nick Schulman	$3,854,888	
2016 WSOP Event 67 – High Roller for One Drop	$19,316,565	(Germany) Fedor Holz	$4,981,775	
2025 Triton Poker Super High Roller Series Jeju	$19,200,000	(Portugal) Joao Vieira	$4,610,000	
2023 Triton Poker Super High Roller Series London	$18,875,000	(Canada) Timothy Adams	$4,185,000	
2024 WSOP Super High Roller	$18,675,000	(India) Santhosh Suvarna	$5,415,152	
2020 PokerStars Sunday Million 14th Anniversary Online	$18,603,200	(Brazil) Alex Brito	$1,192,802	
2024 Triton Poker Super High Roller Series Montenegro	$18,600,000	(Poland) Wiktor Malinowski	$4,789,000	
2018 Super High Roller Bowl China	$18,550,297 (HK$ 145,500,000)	(United States) Justin Bonomo	$4,823,077 (HK$37,830,000)	
2024 WSOP Paradise - Triton Million	$18,200,000	(United States) Alex Foxen	$3,850,000	
2024 Triton Poker Super High Roller Series Montenegro	$18,150,000	(Estonia) Vladimir Korzinin	$4,350,000	
2025 Triton Poker Super High Roller Series Montenegro	$18,000,000	(United States) Jesse Lonis	$3,446,298	
2013 WSOP Event 47 – One Drop High Roller	$17,891,148	(United States) Anthony Gregg	$4,830,619	
2026 Triton Poker Super High Roller Series Jeju	$17,800,000	(United States) Ben Tollerene	$3,766,000	
2024 Triton Poker Super High Roller Series Jeju	$17,550,000	(Hong Kong) Elton Tsang	$4,210,000	
2025 WSOP Mystery Millions	$17,295,520	(United States) Michael Wilklow	$1,000,000	
2023 Triton Poker Super High Roller Series Cyprus	$17,200,000	(Azerbaijan) Ramin Hajiyev	$4,122,554	
2023 WSOP Super High Roller	$17,181,000	(United States) Chris Brewer	$5,293,556	
2025 Triton Poker Super High Roller Series Jeju	$17,100,000	(Norway) Kayhan Roshanfekr	$3,835,059	
2023 Triton Poker Super High Roller Series Monte Carlo	$16,875,000	(Austria) Matthias Eibinger	$3,461,261	
2017 Super High Roller Bowl III	$16,800,000	(Germany) Christoph Vogelsang	$6,000,000	
2023 Triton Poker Super High Roller Series London	$16,200,000	(New Zealand) David Yan	$3,052,002	
2025 Triton Poker Super High Roller Series Montenegro	$16,200,000	(United States) Jason Koon	$3,393,656	
2024 WSOP Mystery Millions	$16,199,920	(Australia) Malcolm Trayner	$1,000,000	
2025 WSOP Millionaire Maker	$15,924,690	undefined		
2026 Triton Poker Super High Roller Series Montenegro	$15,900,000	(Hong Kong) Daniel Tang	$3,522,000	
2026 WSOP Monster Stack	$15,841,057	(United States) Richard Alsup	$1,302,125	
2025 WSOP $250,000 Super High Roller	$15,513,750	(United States) Seth Davies	$4,752,551	
2007 WPT Championship	$15,495,750	(Ecuador) Carlos Mortensen	$3,970,415	
2013 GuangDong Asia Millions Main Event	$15,376,897 (HK$ 119,375,000)	(Germany) Niklas Heinecker	$4,456,885 (HK$34,600,000)	
2011 Pokerstars Caribbean Adventure	$15,132,000	(United States) Galen Hall	$2,300,000	
2016 Super High Roller Bowl II	$15,000,000	(Germany) Rainer Kempe	$5,000,000	
2023 WSOP Paradise Main Event	$15,000,000	(Germany) Stanislav Zegal	$2,000,000	

*	Due to a prize splitting deal Aaron Zang received £13,779,491 ($16,775,820) for 1st, original payout for 1st was £19,000,000 ($23,100,000). Bryn Kenney received a larger cash prize of £16,775,820 ($20,563,324) for 2nd place.
