= 2014 World Series of Poker =

Series of poker tournaments

- Location: Rio All-Suite Hotel and Casino, Las Vegas, Nevada
- Dates: May 27 – July 14

Champion
- (Sweden) Martin Jacobson

The 2014 World Series of Poker is the 45th annual World Series of Poker (WSOP). It was held at the Rio All-Suite Hotel & Casino in Paradise, Nevada, USA, between May 27 – July 14, 2014. There were 65 bracelet events, culminating in the $10,000 No Limit Hold'em Main Event beginning on July 5. The November Nine concept returned for a seventh year, with the Main Event finalists returning on November 10. For the first time, the Main Event had a guaranteed $10 million first prize. The $1,000,000 Big One for One Drop was also held for the second time.

== Event schedule ==
#	Event	Entrants	Winner	Prize	Runner-up	Results
1	$500 Casino Employees No Limit Hold'em	876	Roland Reparejo (1/1)	$82,835	Corey Emery	Results
2	$25,000 Mixed Max No Limit Hold'em	131	Vanessa Selbst (1/3)	$871,148	Jason Mo	Results
3	$1,000 Pot Limit Omaha	1,128	Brandon Shack-Harris (1/1)	$205,634	Morgan Popham	Results
4	$1,000 No Limit Hold'em	2,223	Kyle Cartwright (1/1)	$360,278	Jason Paster	Results
5	$10,000 Limit 2-7 Triple Draw Lowball	120	Tuan Le (1/1)	$355,324	Justin Bonomo	Results
6	$1,500 No Limit Hold'em Shootout	948	Alex Bolotin (1/1)	$259,211	Dimitar Danchev	Results
7	$1,500 Seven Card Razz	352	Ted Forrest (1/6)	$121,196	Phil Hellmuth (0/13)	Results
8	$1,500 Millionaire Maker No Limit Hold'em	7,977	Jonathan Dimmig (1/1)	$1,319,587	Jeffrey Coburn	Results
9	$1,000 No Limit Hold'em	1,940	Jeff Smith (1/1)	$323,125	Danny Nguyen	Results
10	$10,000 Limit Omaha Hi-Low Split-8 or Better	178	Brock Parker (1/3)	$443,407	Richard Ashby (0/1)	Results
11	$1,500 No Limit Hold'em Six Handed	1,587	Justin Bonomo (1/1)	$449,980	Mike Sowers	Results
12	$1,500 Pot Limit Hold'em	557	Gregory Kolo (1/1)	$169,225	Kazu Oshima	Results
13	$10,000 No Limit 2-7 Draw Lowball	87	Paul Volpe (1/1)	$253,524	Daniel Negreanu (0/6)	Results
14	$1,500 Limit Omaha Hi-Low Split-8 or Better	1,036	Nick Kost (1/1)	$283,275	Kal Raichura	Results
15	$3,000 No Limit Hold'em Six Handed	810	Davidi Kitai (1/3)	$508,640	Gordon Vayo	Results
16	$1,500 Limit 2-7 Triple Draw Lowball	348	Todd Bui (1/1)	$124,510	Tom Franklin (0/1)	Results
17	$1,000 Seniors No Limit Hold'em Championship	4,425	Dan Heimiller (1/2)	$627,462	Donald Maas	Results
18	$10,000 Seven Card Razz	112	George Danzer (1/1)	$294,792	Brandon Shack-Harris (1/1)	Results
19	$1,500 No Limit Hold'em	2,086	Ted Gillis (1/1)	$514,027	John Hennigan (0/2)	Results
20	$3,000 No Limit Hold'em Shootout	389	Kory Kilpatrick (1/1)	$254,891	Eric Wasserson	Results
21	$1,000 No Limit Hold'em	2,043	Dominik Nitsche (2/3)	$335,659	Dave D'Alesandro	Results
22	$10,000 H.O.R.S.E.	200	Christopher Wallace (1/1)	$507,614	Randy Ohel	Results
23	$1,000 Turbo No Limit Hold'em	1,473	Doug Polk (1/1)	$251,969	Andy Philachack	Results
24	$5,000 No Limit Hold'em Six Handed	541	Kevin Eyster (1/1)	$622,998	Pierre Neuville	Results
25	$2,500 Omaha/Seven Card Stud Hi-Low Split-8 or Better	470	John Kabbaj (1/2)	$267,327	Thomas Keller (0/1)	Results
26	$1,500 No Limit Hold'em	1,594	Andrew Rennhack (1/1)	$408,953	Michael Katz	Results
27	$1,500 H.O.R.S.E.	743	Tommy Hang (1/1)	$230,744	Jim Collopy (0/1)	Results
28	$10,000 Pot Limit Hold'em	160	Alex Bilokur (1/1)	$398,567	Matt O'Donnell	Results
29	$2,500 No Limit Hold'em	1,165	Pierre Milan (1/1)	$536,768	Justin Oliver (0/1)	Results
30	$1,500 Seven Card Stud Hi-Low 8-or Better	588	Calvin Anderson (1/1)	$190,538	Joe Tehan	Results
31	$1,500 No Limit Hold'em	1,631	Brett Shaffer (1/2)	$418,435	R.J. Sullivan	Results
32	$10,000 No Limit Hold'em Six Handed	264	Joe Cada (1/2)	$670,041	Jeremy Ausmus (0/1)	Results
33	$1,000 No Limit Hold'em	1,688	Dutch Boyd (1/3)	$288,744	Steven Norden	Results
34	$1,500 Seven Card Stud	345	Eric Buchman (1/2)	$118,785	Alex Kravchenko (0/1)	Results
35	$5,000 No Limit Hold'em Eight Handed	550	Brian Yoon (1/2)	$633,341	Josh Arieh (0/2)	Results
36	$1,500 No Limit 2-7 Draw Lowball	241	Steven Wolansky (1/1)	$89,483	Joseph Cheong	Results
37	$1,500 Pot Limit Omaha	967	Brandon Paster (1/1)	$264,400	Marcel Vonk (0/1)	Results
38	$10,000 Seven Card Stud Hi-Low Split-8 or Better	134	George Danzer (2/2)	$352,696	John Racener	Results
39	$3,000 No Limit Hold'em	992	Sean Dempsey (1/1)	$548,460	Ryan Jaconetti	Results
40	$10,000 Heads Up No Limit Hold'em	136	Davide Suriano (1/1)	$335,553	Sam Stein (0/1)	Results
41	$1,500 Dealers Choice Six Handed	419	Robert Mizrachi (1/2)	$147,092	Aaron Schaff	Results
42	$5,000 Pot Limit Omaha Six Handed	452	Michael Drummond (1/1)	$541,747	Darius Studdard	Results
43	$1,500 Limit Hold'em	657	Dan Kelly (1/2)	$195,167	Yegor Tsurikov	Results
44	$1,500 No Limit Hold'em	1,914	Jordan Morgan (1/1)	$478,102	Evan McNiff	Results
45	$1,000 No Limit Hold'em (1/1)	1,841	Will Givens (1/1)	$306,634	Angela Prada-Moed	Results
46	$50,000 Poker Players Championship	102	John Hennigan (1/3)	$1,517,767	Brandon Shack-Harris (1/1)	Results
47	$1,500 Ante Only No Limit Hold'em	714	Jesse McEuen (1/1)	$212,093	Jonas Lauck	Results
48	$1,500 Pot Limit Omaha Hi-Low Split-8 or Better	991	Tyler Patterson (1/1)	$270,992	Scott Clements (0/2)	Results
49	$5,000 No Limit Hold'em	696	David Miscikowski (1/1)	$719,707	Norbert Szecsi (0/1)	Results
50	$1,500 Eight Game Mix	485	Phil Ivey (1/10)	$166,986	Bruce Yamron	Results
51	$1,500 No Limit Hold'em Monster Stack	7,862	Hugo Pingray (1/1)	$1,327,083	Joe McKeehen	Results
52	$10,000 Limit Hold'em	122	David Olson (1/1)	$303,909	Mikail Tulchinskiy	Results
53	$10,000 Ladies No Limit Hold'em Championship	793	Haixia Zhang (1/1)	$153,470	Mikiyo Aoki	Results
54	$3,000 Pot Limit Omaha Hi-Low Split-8 or Better	474	Florian Langmann (1/1)	$297,650	Zach Freeman	Results
55	$1,500 No Limit Hold'em	2,396	Asi Moshe (1/1)	$582,321	Michael Ferrer	Results
56	$1,000 No Limit Hold'em	2,525	Mike Kachan (1/1)	$403,483	Jeff Blenkarn	Results
57	$1,000,000 The Big One for One Drop	42	Daniel Colman (1/1)	$15,306,668	Daniel Negreanu (0/6)	Results
58	$1,500 No Limit Hold'em Mixed Max	1,475	Jared Jaffee (1/1)	$405,428	Mike Watson	Results
59	$3,000 Omaha Hi-Low Split-8 or Better	457	Phil Hui (1/1)	$286,976	Zack Milchman	Results
60	$1,500 No Limit Hold'em	2,563	Salman Jaddi (1/1)	$614,248	Brandon Hall	Results
61	$10,000 Seven Card Stud	102	Matt Grapenthien (1/1)	$268,473	Todd Brunson (0/1)	Results
62	$1,111 The Little One for One Drop	4,496	Igor Dubinskyy (1/1)	$637,539	Theodore Driscoll	Results
63	$1,500 10-Game Mix Six Handed	445	Bryn Kenney (1/1)	$153,220	Jan Suchanek	Results
64	$10,000 Pot Limit Omaha	418	Pat Walsh (1/1)	$923,379	Javed Abrahams	Results
65	$10,000 No Limit Hold'em Main Event	6,683	Martin Jacobson (1/1)	$10,000,000	Felix Stephensen	Results

== Player of the Year ==
Final standings as of October 18 (end of WSOPAP):

Standings
Rank	Name	Points	Bracelets
1	(Germany) George Danzer	923.50	3
2	(United States) Brandon Shack-Harris	806.70	1
3	(United States) John Hennigan	557.88	1
4	(Canada) Daniel Negreanu	519.08	0
5	(Germany) Ismael Bojang	467.91	0
6	(United States) Daniel Colman	452.40	1
7	(United States) Justin Bonomo	449.63	1
8	(United Kingdom) Richard Ashby	413.55	0
9	(United States) Brock Parker	406.25	1
10	(United States) Calvin Anderson	398.20	1

== The Big One for One Drop ==
The second edition of the $1,000,000 Big One for One Drop began on June 29. The tournament drew 42 entries, 6 fewer than the first edition in 2012, creating a prize pool of more than $37,000,000. The winner of the tournament earned $15,306,668. The tournament was first conceived by Cirque du Soleil founder Guy Laliberte to benefit the One Drop Foundation, with $111,111 of each buy-in being donated to the foundation; in addition, the donation was the only rake taken from the prize pool, with the WSOP taking nothing for itself.

=== Results ===
Place	Name	Prize
1st	Daniel Colman	$15,306,668
2nd	Daniel Negreanu	$8,288,001
3rd	Christoph Vogelsang	$4,480,001
4th	Rick Salomon	$2,800,000
5th	Tobias Reinkemeier	$2,053,334
6th	Scott Seiver	$1,680,000
7th	Paul Newey	$1,418,667
8th	Cary Katz	$1,306,667

== Main Event ==
The $10,000 No Limit Hold'em Main Event began on July 5 with the first of three starting days. The final table was reached on July 14, with the November Nine returning on November 10.

The Main Event attracted 6,683 entrants, creating a prize pool of $62,820,200. The top 693 finishes placed in the money, with the finalists guaranteed $730,725 and the winner earning $10,000,000.

=== Performance of past champions ===
Name	Championship Year(s)	Day of Elimination
Tom McEvoy	1983	2A
Berry Johnston	1986	2C
Johnny Chan	1987, 1988	3
Phil Hellmuth	1989	2C
Dan Harrington	1995	2B
Huck Seed	1996	4
Scotty Nguyen	1998	2C
Carlos Mortensen	2001	2C
Robert Varkonyi	2002	3
Chris Moneymaker	2003	3
Greg Raymer	2004	1C
Joe Hachem	2005	2C
Jamie Gold	2006	1C
Jerry Yang	2007	1C
Joe Cada	2009	2C
Jonathan Duhamel	2010	2C
Greg Merson	2012	2A
Ryan Riess	2013	3

Notably absent was 1976 and 1977 Main Event champion Doyle Brunson who reported earlier in his Twitter account he will not be attending the event since the tournament hours are too long and demand too much energy. He also stated he needed to stay home to take care of his wife who was feeling ill at the time.

This was the first time since 2002 that no previous champion cashed in the Main Event, with Huck Seed making it to Day 4, the only former champ to make it to Day 4.

=== Other notable high finishes ===
NB: This list is restricted to top 100 finishers with an existing Wikipedia entry.

Place	Name	Prize
10th	Luis Velador	$565,193
20th	Dan Smith	$286,900
57th	Vitaly Lunkin	$124,447
64th	Brian Hastings	$103,025
77th	Maria Ho	$85,812

=== November Nine ===
Mark Newhouse made historic back to back final tables. After finishing 9th in 2013 for $733,224 he finished 9th again for $730,725. Bruno Politano was the first Brazilian to final table the main event. He finished 8th for $947,172.

Name	Number of chips (percentage of total)	WSOP Bracelets	WSOP Cashes*	WSOP Earnings*
(Netherlands) Jorryt van Hoof	38,375,000 (19.1%)	0	3	$27,956
(Norway) Felix Stephensen	32,775,000 (16.3%)	0	0	0
(United States) Mark Newhouse	26,000,000 (13.0%)	0	8	$906,093
(Spain) Andoni Larrabe	22,550,000 (11.2%)	0	3	$20,068
(United States) Dan Sindelar	21,200,000 (10.6%)	0	17	$149,991
(United States) William Pappaconstantinou	17,500,000 (8.7%)	0	0	0
(United States) William Tonking	15,050,000 (7.5%)	0	3	$14,701
(Sweden) Martin Jacobson	14,900,000 (7.4%)	0	15	$1,223,987
(Brazil) Bruno Politano	12,125,000 (6.0%)	0	3	$25,404

*Career statistics prior to the beginning of the 2014 Main Event.

=== Final Table ===
Place	Name	Prize
1st	Martin Jacobson	$10,000,000
2nd	Felix Stephensen	$5,147,911
3rd	Jorryt van Hoof	$3,807,753
4th	William Tonking	$2,849,763
5th	William Pappaconstantinou	$2,143,794
6th	Andoni Larrabe	$1,622,471
7th	Dan Sindelar	$1,236,084
8th	Bruno Politano	$947,172
9th	Mark Newhouse	$730,725

== Records ==
Event #8: $1,500 Millionaire Maker No Limit Hold'em attracted 7,977 entries. It established a new record as the largest single-day starting field when 4,722 players played in Day 1a. It was also the largest non-Main Event field in WSOP history, and the second largest field overall after the 2006 Main Event.

Ronnie Bardah finished in 475th place in the Main Event, setting a new record by cashing in five consecutive Main Events. He previously finished in 24th in 2010, 453rd in 2011, 540th in 2012, and 124th in 2013.
