= Big One for One Drop =

High Roller Texas Hold'em poker tournament

- Game: Poker – Texas hold 'em
- Founded: 2011, Las Vegas USA
- Founder: Guy Laliberté
- First season: 2012
- Most recent season: 2023
- Owner: One Drop Foundation
- Most recent champion: (Belarus) Mikita Badziakouski
- Website: Official website

The Big One for One Drop is a $1,000,000 buy-in No Limit Texas hold 'em poker tournament hosted first in 2012, and for its first four editions, with the World Series of Poker (WSOP). It became the highest buy-in poker tournament in history as well as the largest single payout offered. The event was hosted again in 2014, 2016 and 2018. The Big One returned in December 2023 and was hosted by the World Poker Tour (WPT) during the WPT World Championship at Wynn Las Vegas.

The event is well known for its charitable contributions, with a percentage of each player's buy-in donated to the One Drop Foundation. The One Drop Foundation is an international non-profit organization, created by Cirque du Soleil founder Guy Laliberté, that works to ensure unconditional access to safe water and sanitation in regions facing the most extreme barriers worldwide.

== History ==
Canadian entrepreneur Guy Laliberté started the Big One for One Drop in 2012 as a No-Limit Hold 'em event hosted at the World Series of Poker. The event was hosted again by WSOP in 2014, 2016, and 2018, and was hosted by the WPT at Wynn Las Vegas in 2023. Big One for One Drop buy-ins are $1,000,000 or €1,000,000.

In 2012, Antonio Esfandiari won the first Big One for One Drop defeating Sam Trickett heads-up and earned $18,346,673.

In 2014, the final table consisted of professional players such as Dan Colman, Daniel Negreanu, Christoph Vogelsang, Tobias Reinkemeier and Scott Seiver as well as recreational players Paul Newey, Cary Katz and Rick Salomon. Colman won the tournament defeating Negreanu heads up and earned $15,306,668.

In 2016, the Big One for One Drop Extravaganza was held in Monte Carlo. The €1,000,000 buy-in tournament was open only to recreational players. Chinese Canadian businessman Elton Tsang won the event for €11,111,111, defeating Anatoliy Gurtovoy of Russia heads up.

In 2018, the Big One returned to the World Series of Poker. in Las Vegas. 27 players entered for a total prizepool of $24,840,000. $80,000 from each buy-in was donated to the One Drop Foundation for a total donation of $2,160,000.

In 2023, One Drop entered an agreement with the World Poker Tour to host a series of events, including the Big One for One Drop. In December 2023, the fifth edition of the Big One for One Drop was held at the WPT® World Championship at the Wynn Las Vegas. Mikita Badziakouski defeated 16 opponents to win $7,114,500 and become champion of the first-ever WPT® Big One for One Drop. Runner-up, Mario Mosböck, took home $4,663,950. Mikita Badziakouski commented after his win: “The tournament itself is the biggest title I’ve ever had. I just got lucky in a couple big coolers.”

Another high roller event, known in partnership with the WSOP as "High Roller for One Drop," ($111K: 2013, 2015, 2016 and 2017), in partnership with the WPT as "Alpha8 for One Drop" ($111K: 2023), and in partnership with the EPT as "€100,000 High Roller for One Drop" (2026: €100K) has been held seven times.

In 2013, Anthony Gregg won the $111,111 buy-in High Roller event, defeating Chris Klodnicki heads up and earning $4,830,619. Jonathan Duhamel (2015), Fedor Holz (2016) and Doug Polk (2017) were the subsequent winners of the High Roller for One Drop tournaments.

In 2023, two Alpha8 for One Drop tournaments were held. Jonathan Jaffe won the first Alpha8 Las Vegas 45-player event winning $1,537,600. Steve O’Dwyer won the Alpha8 18-player tournament in Jeju, South Korea, taking home $1,009,520.

In 2026, One Drop aligned with the European Poker Tour for a High Roller for One Drop Tournament during the prestigious EPT Monte Carlo festival, drawing an EPT record of 76 entries for a €100,000 event. Albert Daher of Lebanon emerged as the winner from an elite final table, winning €2,055,000. Stephen Chidwick from the UK was the runner-up, winning €1,325,700.

== Results ==
Non-bracelet events

Year	Event name	Entrants	Winner	Top Prize (US$)	Runner-up
2012	$1,000,000 Big One for One Drop	48	(United States) Antonio Esfandiari	$18,346,673	(United Kingdom) Sam Trickett
2013	$100,000 High Roller for One Drop	166	(United States) Anthony Gregg	$4,830,619	(United States) Chris Klodnicki
2014	$1,000,000 Big One for One Drop	42	(United States) Dan Colman	$15,306,668	(Canada) Daniel Negreanu
2015	$100,000 High Roller for One Drop	135	(Canada) Jonathan Duhamel	$3,989,985	(United States) Bill Klein
2016	$100,000 High Roller for One Drop	183	(Germany) Fedor Holz	$4,981,775	(United States) Dan Smith
2016	€1,000,000 Monte-Carlo One Drop Extravaganza	28	(Canada) Elton Tsang	$12,248,912	(Russia) Anatoly Gurtovy
2017	$100,000 High Roller for One Drop	130	(United States) Doug Polk	$3,686,865	(France) Bertrand "ElkY" Grospellier
2018	$1,000,000 Big One for One Drop	27	(United States) Justin Bonomo	$10,000,000	(Germany) Fedor Holz
2019-2022	not held				
2023	$111,000 Alpha8 for One Drop, Las Vegas	45	(United States) Jonathan Jaffe	$1,537,600	(United States) Taylor von Kriegenbergh
2023	$111,000 Alpha8 for One Drop, South Korea	18	(United States) Steve O'Dwyer	$1,009,520	(China) Quan Zhou
2023	$1,000,000 Big One for One Drop	17	(Belarus) Mikita Badziakouski	$7,114,500	(Austria) Mario Mosböck
2023	€100,000 EPT High Roller for One Drop	76	(Lebanon) Albert Daher	€2,055,000	(United Kingdom) Stephen Chidwick

=== 2012 Big One for One Drop ===
- 3-Day Event: July 1–3
- Buy-in: $1,000,000
- Number of Entries: 48
- Total Prize Pool: $42,666,672
- Number of Payouts: 9
- Winning Hand: 7♦ 5♠

Final Table
Place	Name	Prize
1st	(United States) Antonio Esfandiari	$18,346,673
2nd	(United Kingdom) Sam Trickett	$10,112,001
3rd	(United States) David Einhorn	$4,352,000
4th	(United States) Phil Hellmuth	$2,645,333
5th	(Canada) Guy Laliberté	$1,834,666
6th	(United States) Brian Rast	$1,621,333
7th	(United States) Bobby Baldwin	$1,408,000
8th	(Malaysia) Richard Yong	$1,237,333

=== 2013 High Roller for One Drop ===
- 4-Day Event: June 26–29
- Buy-in: $111,111
- Number of Entries: 166
- Total Prize Pool: $17,891,148
- Number of Payouts: 24
- Winning Hand: 9♦ 2♥

Final Table
Place	Name	Prize
1st	(United States) Anthony Gregg	$4,830,619
2nd	(United States) Chris Klodnicki	$2,985,495
3rd	(United States) Bill Perkins	$1,965,163
4th	(United States) Antonio Esfandiari	$1,433,438
5th	(United States) Richard Fullerton	$1,066,491
6th	(Sweden) Martin Jacobson	$807,427
7th	(United States) Brandon Steven	$621,180
8th	(United States) Nick Schulman	$485,029

=== 2014 Big One for One Drop ===
- 3-Day Event: June 29–July 1
- Buy-in: $1,000,000
- Number of Entries: 42
- Total Prize Pool: $37,333,338
- Number of Payouts: 8
- Winning Hand: K♦ Q♥

Final Table
Place	Name	Prize
1st	(United States) Dan Colman	$15,306,668
2nd	(Canada) Daniel Negreanu	$8,288,001
3rd	(Germany) Christoph Vogelsang	$4,480,001
4th	(United States) Rick Salomon	$2,800,000
5th	(Germany) Tobias Reinkemeier	$2,053,334
6th	(United States) Scott Seiver	$1,680,000
7th	(United Kingdom) Paul Newey	$1,418,667
8th	(United States) Cary Katz	$1,306,667

=== 2015 High Roller for One Drop ===
- 2-Day Event: June 28–29
- Buy-in: $111,111
- Number of Entries: 135
- Total Prize Pool: $14,249,925
- Number of Payouts: 16
- Winning Hand: K♣ K♠

Final Table
Place	Name	Prize
1st	(Canada) Jonathan Duhamel	$3,989,985
2nd	(United States) Bill Klein	$2,465,522
3rd	(United States) Dan Colman	$1,544,121
4th	(United States) Ben Sulsky	$1,118,049
5th	(United States) Dan Perper	$873,805
6th	(United States) Phil Hellmuth	$696,821
7th	(United States) Anthony Zinno	$565,864
8th	(Russia) Sergey Lebedev	$466,970

=== 2016 High Roller for One Drop ===
- 3-Day Event: July 8–10
- Buy-in: $111,111
- Number of Entries: 183
- Total Prize Pool: $19,316,565
- Number of Payouts: 28
- Winning Hand: 8♣ 7♣

Final Table
Place	Name	Prize
1st	(Germany) Fedor Holz	$4,981,775
2nd	(United States) Dan Smith	$3,078,974
3rd	(Germany) Koray Aldemir	$2,154,265
4th	(United Kingdom) Jack Salter	$1,536,666
5th	(United States) Brian Green	$1,117,923
6th	(United States) Joe McKeehen	$829,792
7th	(United States) Nick Petrangelo	$628,679
8th	(United Kingdom) Niall Farrell	$486,383

=== 2016 Monte-Carlo One Drop Extravaganza ===
- 3-Day Event: October 14–16
- Buy-in: €1,000,000
- Number of Entries: 28 (2 rebuys)
- Total Prize Pool: $27,437,564
- Number of Payouts: 6
- Winning Hand: 6♣ 5♥

Final Table
Place	Name	Prize	Prize in EUR (€)
1st	(Canada) Elton Tsang	$12,248,912	€11,111,111
2nd	(Russia) Anatoly Gurtovy	$5,983,597	€5,427,781
3rd	(United States) Rick Salomon	$3,307,206	€3,000,000
4th	(United Kingdom) James Bord	$2,315,044	€2,100,000
5th	(United States) Cary Katz	$1,929,203	€1,750,000
6th	(Canada) Andrew Pantling	$1,653,603	€1,500,000

=== 2017 High Roller for One Drop ===
- 4-Day Event: June 2–5
- Buy-in: $111,111
- Number of Entries: 130
- Total Prize Pool: $13,722,150
- Number of Payouts: 20
- Winning Hand: Q♠ 5♣

Final Table
Place	Name	Prize
1st	(United States) Doug Polk	$3,686,865
2nd	(France) Bertrand Grospellier	$2,278,657
3rd	(Italy) Dario Sammartino	$1,608,295
4th	(Canada) Haralabos Voulgaris	$1,158,883
5th	(United States) Chris Moore	$852,885
6th	(Sweden) Martin Jacobson	$641,382
7th	(Germany) Rainer Kempe	$493,089
8th	(United States) Andrew Robl	$387,732

=== 2018 Big One for One Drop ===
- 3-Day Event: July 15–17
- Buy-in: $1,000,000
- Number of Entries: 27
- Total Prize Pool: $24,840,000
- Number of Payouts: 5
- Winning Hand: A♠ J♦

Final Table
Place	Name	Prize
1st	(United States) Justin Bonomo	$10,000,000
2nd	(Germany) Fedor Holz	$6,000,000
3rd	(United States) Dan Smith	$4,000,000
4th	(United States) Rick Salomon	$2,840,000
5th	(United States) Byron Kaverman	$2,000,000

=== 2023 WPT Alpha8 for One Drop (Las Vegas) ===
- 3-Day Event: July 14–16
- Buy-in: $111,000
- Number of Entries: 45
- Total Prize Pool: $4,612,500
- Number of Payouts: 7
- Winning Hand: 10♥ 10♦

Final Table
Place	Name	Prize
1st	(United States) Jonathan Jaffe	$1,537,600
2nd	(United States) Taylor von Kriegenbergh	$1,042,100
3rd	(United States) Dan Smith	$701,700
4th	(Latvia) Aleksejs Ponakovs	$485,200
5th	(United States) Michael Lim	$350,100
6th	(United Kingdom) Iaron Lightbourne	$273,200
7th	(United States) Isaac Haxton	$222,600

=== 2023 WPT Alpha8 for One Drop (Jeju, South Korea) ===
- 2-Day Event: July 21–22
- Buy-in: $111,000
- Number of Entries: 18
- Total Prize Pool: $2,219,89
- Number of Payouts: 4

Final Table
Place	Name	Prize
1st	(United States) Steve O'Dwyer	$1,009,520
2nd	(China) Quan Zhou	$560,009
3rd	(China) Chenxu Zhang	$390,218
4th	Anonymous	$260,146

=== 2023 WPT Big One for One Drop ===
- 3-Day Event: December 18–20
- Buy-in: $1,000,000
- Number of Entries: 17
- Total Prize Pool: $15,810,000
- Number of Payouts: 4
- Winning Hand: A♦ 9♠

Final Table
Place	Name	Prize
1st	(Belarus) Mikita Badziakouski	$7,114,500
2nd	(Austria) Mario Mosböck	$4,663,950
3rd	(United States) Dan Smith	$2,806,750
4th	(United States) Isaac Haxton	$1,224,800

=== 2026 EPT High Roller for One Drop (Monte Carlo) ===
- 3-Day Event: May 1–3
- Buy-in: €100,000
- Number of Entries: 76
- Total Prize Pool: €7,296,000
- Number of Payouts: 11
- Winning Hand: 4♠ 4♣

Final Table
Place	Name	Prize
1st	(Lebanon) Albert Daher	€2,055,000
2nd	(United Kingdom) Stephen Chidwick	€1,325,700
3rd	(Italy) Leonardo Drago	€947,000
4th	(United States) Bryn Kenney	€728,500
5th	(Belarus) Artsiom Lasouski	€560,300
6th	(Poland) Wiktor Malinowski	€445,400
7th	(Italy) Enrico Camosci	€356,400
8th	(Netherlands) Teun Mulder	€284,900
9th	(Germany) Tom Robiin Fuchs	€228,000
10th	(Turkey) Orpen Kisacikoglu	€128,400
11th	(United States) Byron Kaverman	€128,400
