= Ocean Finance =

British financial services company

- Trade name: Ocean
- Company type: Privately owned
- Industry: Financial services
- Founded: 1991
- Founder: Paul Newey
- Headquarters: Manchester, England
- Area served: United Kingdom
- Products: Credit cards, loans, mortgages, car finance
- Owner: Intelligent Lending Limited
- Website: www.oceanfinance.co.uk

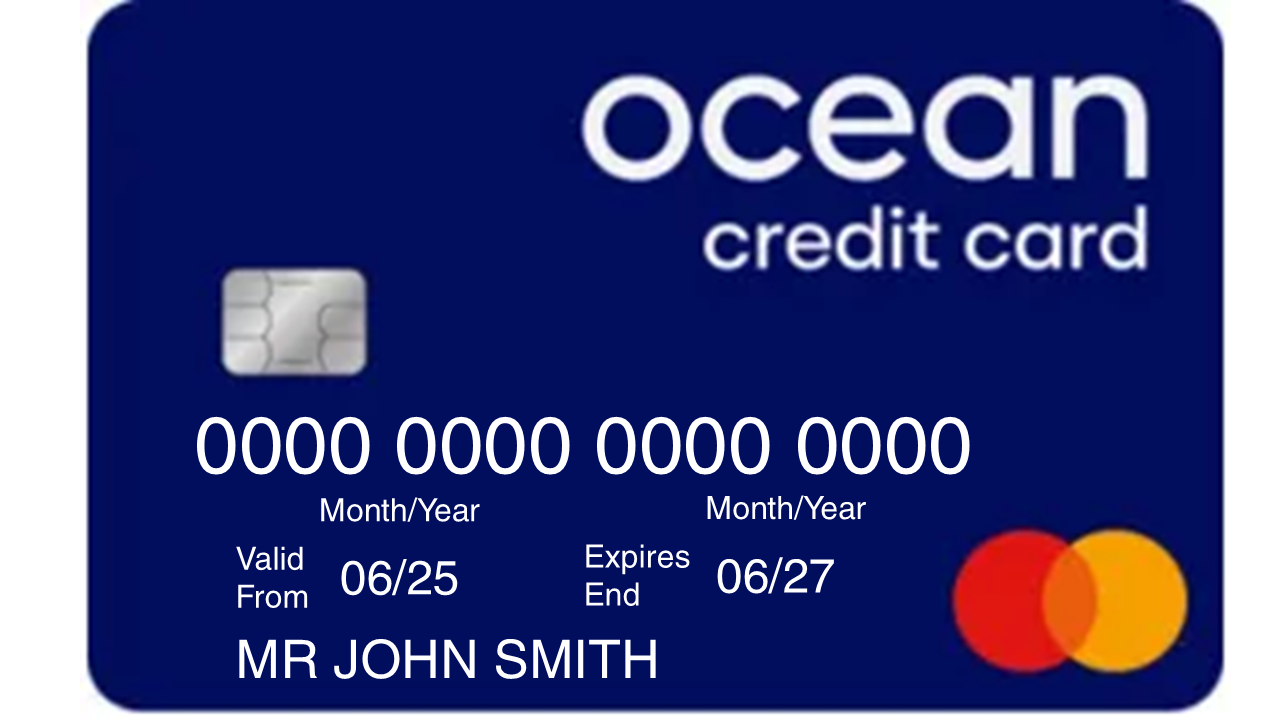
An example of an Ocean credit card

Ocean Finance is a loans, credit card and mortgages business set up in 1991 in Staffordshire, United Kingdom.

== History ==
It became known in the late 1990s and early 2000s for its advertising, including sponsoring its own channel on Sky TV and its advertising became widely parodied. The firm prospered on the back of rising house prices and the credit boom. By 2002 the firm was a leading player in the UK's secured loan market valued at over £14bn.

The firm was bought by US insurance company American International Group (AIG) in 2006 for over £200m. Paul Newey stepped down as chief executive in 2009.

Ocean Finance was the shirt sponsor of Tamworth F.C. from 2004 - 2009. In 2008, it launched the UK's first TV channel dedicated to promoting loans and mortgages.

Like many other mortgage businesses it struggled after the 2008 financial crisis. The Ocean Finance brand was acquired by Think Money Group in 2012. In 2014 the company launched the Ocean Credit Card in conjunction with Capital One.

== Criticisms ==
In 2004, the firm was criticized by some for its focus on offering second charge (secured) loans, to sub prime customers, often used for debt consolidation.
