= One Drop Foundation =

Non-profit organization

One Drop is an international non-profit organization based in Montreal, created in 2007 by Cirque du Soleil founder Guy Laliberté, which is focused on water initiatives. In July 2026, the foundation decided to scale down its operations while remaining committed to its mission of solving the water crisis through sustainable actions.

== Arts and culture ==
One Drop uses circus arts, folklore, popular theatre, music, dance and visual arts to raise awareness of water-related issues.

== Projects ==
One Drop has projects in Latin America, India, Canada and Africa.

== Awards and recognition ==
One Drop has received the following recognition:

- 2019 Top 10 International Impact Charities as recognized by Charity Intelligence.
- 2015 "Water for Life" UN-Water Best Water Best Practices Award in the category “Best participatory, communication, awareness-raising and education practices”
- International Water Association Project Innovation Award in the Development category.

== Donations ==
Guy Laliberté has pledged to donate C$100 million to the organization over 25 years.

In its 2012 Annual Report, One Drop reported raising nearly $52 million over the previous five years. Funds were allocated to programs designed to provide permanent safe water to over 340,000 people.

== Poker ==
In 2011, Laliberté teamed with Caesars Entertainment, owner of the World Series of Poker (WSOP), to launch the Big One for One Drop, a $1-million buy-in poker tournament to benefit the organization. The Big One and other charity tournaments would be held within the larger WSOP series of tournaments held each summer in Las Vegas. In early 2023, the One Drop Foundation entered into a new partnership with the World Poker Tour to host charity poker tournaments in Las Vegas and across the world, with a portion of each player’s buy-in going to the One Drop Foundation.
