= Martin Jacobson =

Swedish poker player (born 1987)

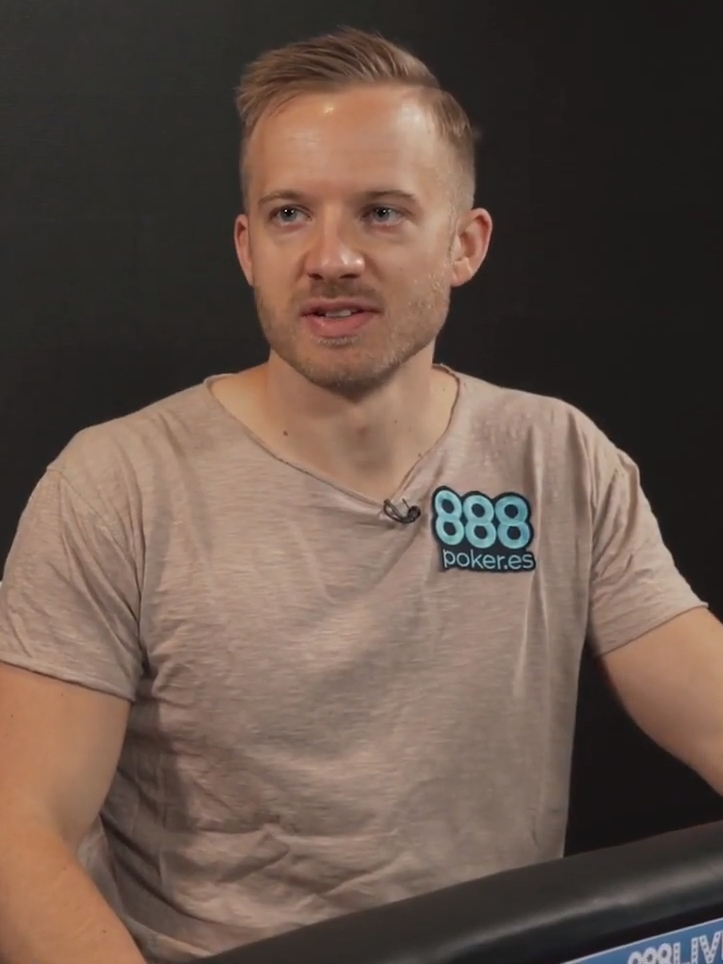
- Jacobson in 2019
- Nickname: M.nosbocaJ (PokerStars)
- Born: 30 June 1987 (age 39); Stockholm, Sweden

World Series of Poker
- Bracelet: 1
- Final tables: 9
- Money finishes: 65
- Highest WSOP Main Event finish: Winner, 2014

World Poker Tour
- Title: None
- Final tables: 2
- Money finishes: 8

European Poker Tour
- Title: None
- Final tables: 4
- Money finishes: 11

Martin Jacobson (born 30 June 1987) is a Swedish professional poker player, originally from Stockholm, Sweden, but currently residing in London, England. In 2014, he won the World Series of Poker Main Event for $10,000,000, the fifth largest single payout in poker tournament history.

== Early years ==
Prior to his poker career, Jacobson studied to be a chef, and even worked aboard a Swedish Royal Navy ship.

He started playing poker during high school, and after his chef experience overseas, he played online in internet cafes, ultimately winning a seat to the 2008 WSOP in Las Vegas. Even though he lost pretty quickly, Martin Jacobson held on to his dream and worked and studied even harder on his poker skills.

== Poker career ==
His first live cash came in 2008, when he came in 3rd place at the European Poker Tour event in Hungary. In season 7 of the EPT he made three final tables, including two runner-up finishes in Vilamoura and Deauville. He also finished runner-up at the World Poker Tour event in Venice in 2009. Prior to the 2014 Main Event, his largest tournament cash came from a 6th-place finish at the Big One for One Drop High Rollers event at the 2013 WSOP, earning $807,000. He has 16 career WSOP cashes, including 5 final tables. At the 2014 Main Event, he ended Day 1A as the chip leader and entered the November Nine in 8th chip position. Beginning heads-up play with the chip lead over Felix Stephensen, on the 35th hand of heads-up, his 10♥ 10♦ prevailed over Stephensen's A♥ 9♥ after the board ran out 3♠ 9♣ 10♣ K♦ 4♣ to win the title.

Jacobson is a member of Raising for Effective Giving, an Effective altruism organization of poker players who pledge to donate at least 2% of their gross tournament winnings and at least 3% of their profit from cash games every quarter to charities considered unusually cost-effective.

In February 2015, Jacobson was named Player of the Year by the Swedish publication 'Poker.se'. This title has previously been awarded to other high-profile professional players such as Viktor Blom, Chris Bjorin, and Robin Ylitalo.

In December 2017, Jacobson joined 888poker as brand ambassador.

As of 2021, his total live tournament winnings exceed $17,000,000. Overall, Jacobson has cashed in 39 World Series events, for a total of $12.150 million combined.

World Series of Poker bracelets
Year	Tournament	Prize (US$)
2014	$10,000 No Limit Hold'em Main Event	$10,000,000
