= Shirley Rosario =

American poker player

- Nickname: Siren
- Born: San Pedro, California, U.S.

World Series of Poker
- Money finishes: 25

Shirley Rosario is a poker player and former website owner. Born in San Pedro, California, she grew up in Torrance, California and currently resides in Downey.

Rosario is a former prop player at the Bicycle Casino. As a prop, Rosario played multiple games. In addition to her prop duties, she was a commentator for the casino's Live at the Bike show, which featured ring game poker games broadcast live over the Internet. The show later aired on The Poker Channel in the UK under the name The L.A. Poker Scene. Rosario spent 2006 recovering from cancer surgery. She is currently cancer free.

Rosario won at the 2005 Legends of Poker Omaha Championship and placed second to Phil Hellmuth in 2003 at the L.A. Poker Classic Omaha Championship. She also placed first at the 2003 Grand Slam of Poker No Limit Hold 'em Shootout at the Hustler Casino and three HORSE events at the Commerce Casino in 2009, 2010, and 2011.

Rosario worked on the business side of poker. She owned and operated a poker information website, Poker-Babes.com, before selling it to PokerStars in 2010. She continues to be the face of the site and updates the blog occasionally. Rosario has been quoted as an expert on women in poker by The Times, the Associated Press and The New York Times,

In 2004, she appeared in Poker for Dummies with Chris Moneymaker.

As of 2018, Rosario's total live tournament winnings exceed $500,000.
