= 2025 World Series of Poker Paradise =

Series of poker tournaments

- Location: Atlantis Paradise Island, The Bahamas
- Dates: December 4 - 18

Champion
- (Austria) Bernhard Binder

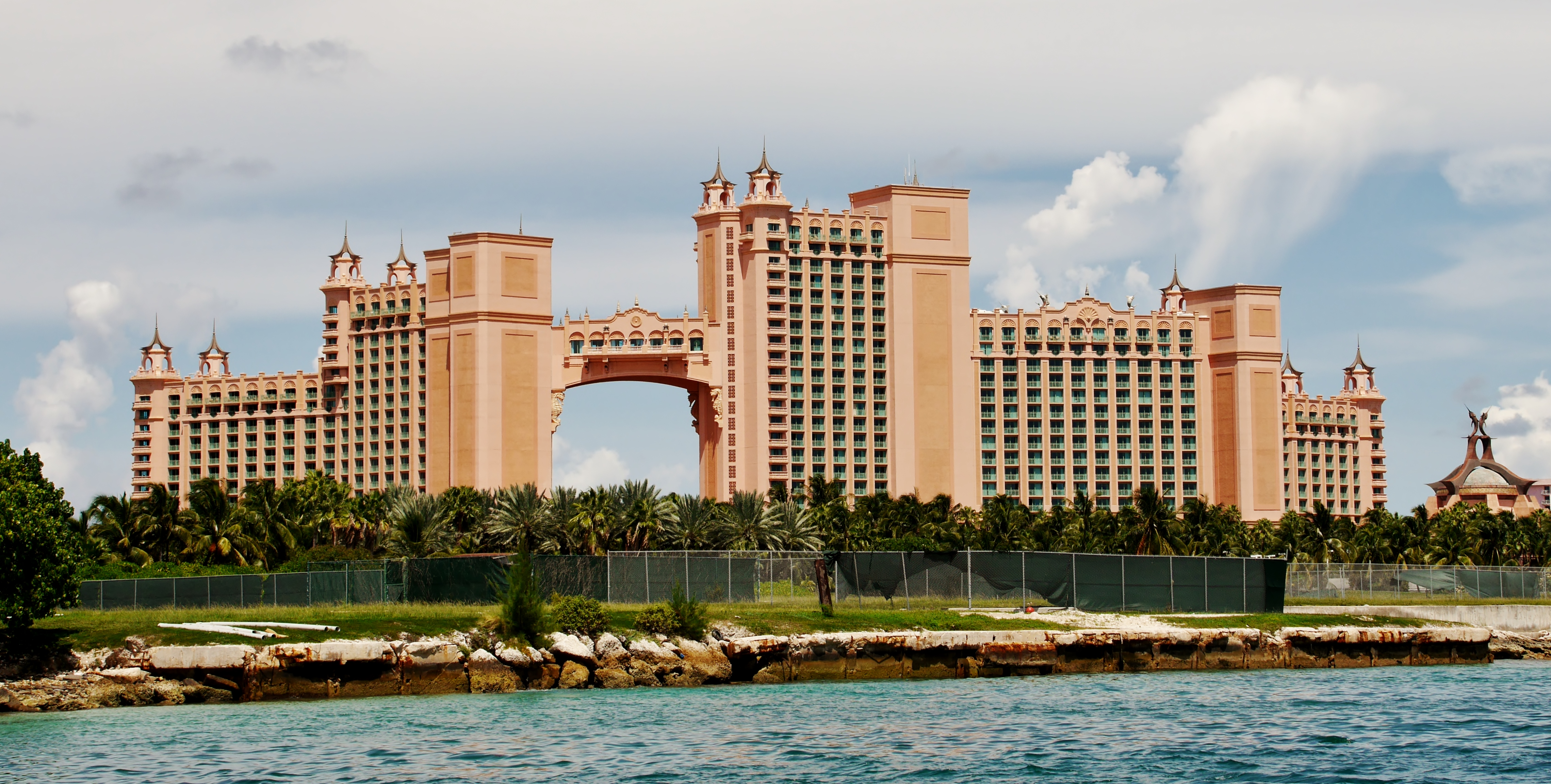
Atlantis Paradise Island

The 2025 World Series of Poker Paradise was the third edition of a festival of poker tournaments organized by the World Series of Poker. It was held from December 4–18 at Atlantis Paradise Island in The Bahamas.

There were 15 WSOP bracelet events, culminating in the $25,000 Super Main Event which featured a prize pool of more than $70,000,000, the largest of any poker tournament other than the WSOP Main Event.

== Event schedule ==
#	Event	Entrants	Winner	Prize	Runner-up
1	$2,500 WSOP Circuit Championship No-Limit Hold'em Mystery Bounty	2,396	(United States) Mark Darner (2/2)	$350,000	(China) Yayun Liu
2	$75,000 Triton Pot-Limit Omaha 6-Handed	93	(Austria) Matthias Eibinger (1/1)	$1,570,640	(Canada) Mike Watson (0/1)
3	$100,000 Triton Pot-Limit Omaha Main Event	103	(United States) Sam Soverel (2/4)	$2,594,000	(Hungary) Andras Nemeth
4	$50,000 No-Limit Hold'em High Roller Turbo	151	(Austria) Daniel Rezaei (1/1)	$1,900,000	(Italy) Mustapha Kanit
5	$250,000 Triton No-Limit Hold'em Invitational	133	(Norway) Kayhan Mokri (1/1)	$7,725,000	(United States) Gabriel Andrade
6	$5,000 Super Colossus No-Limit Hold'em	527	(Lithuania) Rokas Asipauskas (1/1)	$504,950	(United States) Alex Keating (0/1)
7	$10,000 Super PLOSSUS Pot-Limit Omaha	284	(Netherlands) Tom Vogelsang (1/1)	$609,800	(Sweden) Viktor Blom
8	$125,000 Triton No-Limit Hold'em 7-Handed	99	(United States) David Coleman (1/1)	$3,113,000	(Lithuania) Dominykas Mikolaitis
9	$100,000 Triton No-Limit Hold'em Main Event	237	(Latvia) Aleksejs Ponakovs (1/3)	$4,750,000	(Brazil) Pedro Padilha
10	$150,000 Triton No-Limit Hold'em 8-Handed	77	(Brazil) João Simão (1/3)	$3,067,000	(Brazil) Felipe Boianovsky
11	$25,000 Super Main Event	2,891	(Austria) Bernhard Binder (1/1)	$10,000,000	(France) Jean-Noël Thorel
12	$10,000 8-Game Mix	115	(Germany) Koray Aldemir (1/2)	$287,800	(Brazil) Felipe Ramos
13	$50,000 Pot-Limit Omaha High Roller	113	(United States) Charlie Hook (1/1)	$1,456,000	(United States) Michael Moncek (0/2)
14	$25,000 GGMillion$ Single Day Turbo	287	(France) Johan Guilbert (1/1)	$1,534,645	(Finland) Eelis Parssinen (0/1)
15	$2,500 The Closer Turbo Bounty	509	(United States) Imari Love (1/1)	$145,725	(Slovenia) Blaz Zerjav (2/2)

== Super Main Event ==
The $25,000 No-Limit Hold'em Super Main Event began on December 10 with the first of four starting flights. There were a total of 2,891 entries, generating a prize pool of $72,275,000, the eighth-largest in history and largest outside the WSOP Main Event.

Bernhard Binder, an online qualifier from Austria, defeated French businessman Jean-Noël Thorel heads-up to win the bracelet and $10,000,000 first prize.

=== Final table ===
Name	Number of chips (percentage of total)	WSOP Bracelets	WSOP Cashes*	WSOP Earnings*
(France) Jean-Noël Thorel	567,000,000 (39.2%)	0	8	$2,192,918
(Austria) Bernhard Binder	211,000,000 (14.6%)	0	49	$264,565
(United States) Natasha Mercier	165,000,000 (11.4%)	0	34	$855,845
(Brazil) Belarmino De Souza	150,000,000 (10.4%)	0	30	$171,336
(United States) Eric Wasserson	130,500,000 (9.0%)	1	71	$3,550,879
(United States) Terrance Reid	114,500,000 (7.9%)	0	19	$88,261
(Canada) Peter Chien	76,000,000 (5.3%)	1	16	$159,908
(Argentina) Franco Spitale	33,000,000 (2.3%)	1	103	$1,751,748

*- career statistics prior to the 2025 Super Main Event

=== Final table results ===
Place	Name	Prize
1	(Austria) Bernhard Binder	$10,000,000
2	(France) Jean-Noël Thorel	$6,000,000
3	(Brazil) Belarmino De Souza	$4,000,000
4	(United States) Terrance Reid	$3,000,000
5	(United States) Eric Wasserson	$2,350,000
6	(United States) Natasha Mercier	$1,800,000
7	(Canada) Peter Chien	$1,400,000
8	(Argentina) Franco Spitale	$1,100,000
