= Felix Stephensen =

Norwegian poker player (born 1990)

- Nickname: FallAtyourFeet
- Born: 22 July 1990 (age 36); Oslo, Norway

World Series of Poker
- Bracelet: None
- Final table: 1
- Money finishes: 3
- Highest WSOP Main Event finish: 2nd, 2014

European Poker Tour
- Final table: 1
- Money finishes: 4

Felix Vincent Stephensen (born 22 July 1990) is a Norwegian semi-professional poker player currently residing in London, England known for being the runner-up finisher to Martin Jacobson in the 2014 World Series of Poker Main Event. He has earned over $300,000 playing online poker playing under the alias "FallAtyourFeet".

== Poker career ==
Stephensen is primarily an online Pot Limit Omaha cash game specialist playing stakes up to $25/$50 and on rare occasions $200/$400.

Prior to the 2014 WSOP, Stephensen had only two tournament cashes for a total of $22,118. He was in London with no intention of entering any events, but then miraculously won a $1,000 World Cup parlay bet on the Netherlands beating Australia precisely 3-2 with 60 to 1 odds. Netherlands defeated Australia 3-2 and Stephensen cashed for $60,000.

With his new fortune Stephensen flew to Las Vegas, entered the WSOP Main Event, and ended up finishing runner up to Martin Jacobson losing to Jacobson's 10♥ 10♦ with his A♥ 9♥ after moving all in pre-flop. The board ran out 3♠ 9♣ 10♣ K♦ 4♣. It is believed that Stephensen would be taxed 50% of his WSOP winnings if he were to return to Norway.

As of 2014, his total live tournament winnings exceed $5,100,000 most of which has come from his runner-up cash in the 2014 WSOP Main Event. He received a sponsorship from Betsafe, an online casino brand owned by Betsson, the same year.
