= Justin Bonomo =

American poker player (born 1985)

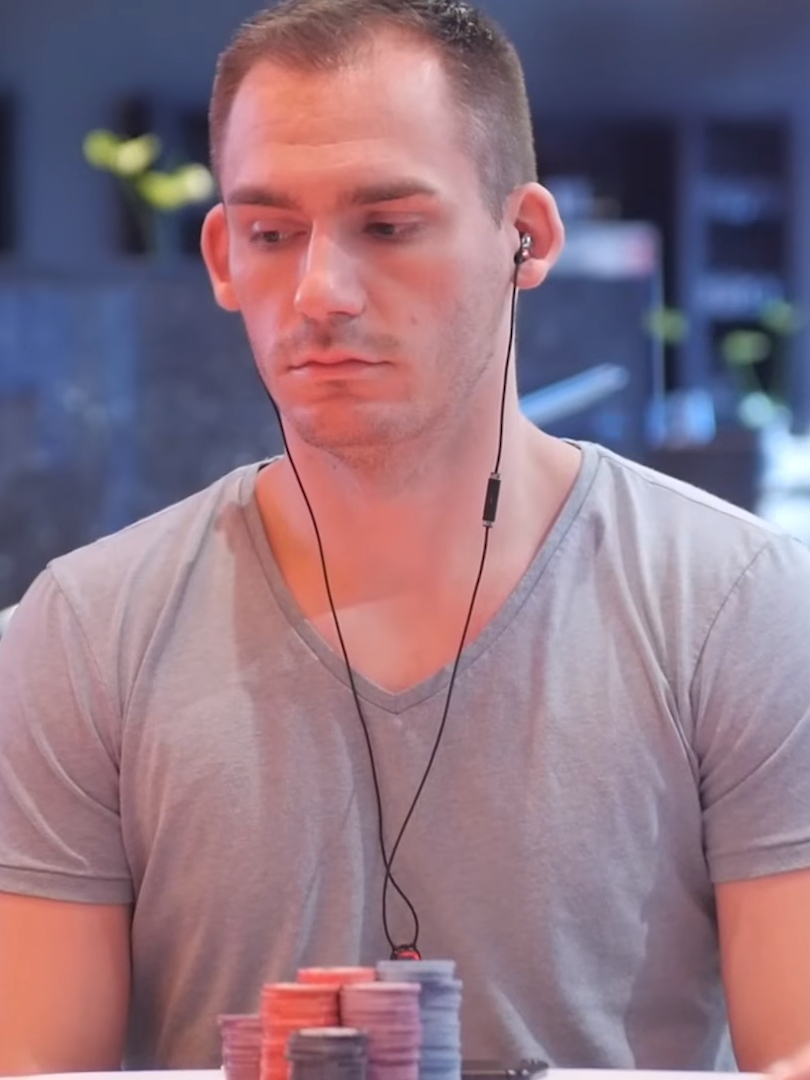
- Bonomo at 2018 WPT Amsterdam
- Nickname: ZeeJustin
- Born: September 30, 1985 (age 41)

World Series of Poker
- Bracelets: 3
- Money finishes: 77
- Highest WSOP Main Event finish: 64th, 2015

World Poker Tour
- Title: None
- Final tables: 6
- Money finishes: 19

European Poker Tour
- Title: None
- Final tables: 16
- Money finishes: 23

Justin Bonomo (born September 30, 1985) (known online as ZeeJustin) is an American high-stakes professional poker player, and a former Magic the Gathering competitor. He became the youngest player to be featured at a televised final table on February 19, 2005, when he placed fourth during the inaugural year of the EPT at the French Open in Deauville, France. He was 19 at the time.

As of August 2026, he ranks fifth on the all-time live tournament poker money list, with $65,611,097 across 246 recorded cashes. He held the number-one position on the all-time list intermittently between July 2018 and August 2023 before being passed by Bryn Kenney, and was subsequently overtaken in 2025 by Stephen Chidwick, Jason Koon, and Mikita Badziakouski during an extended absence from tournament play.

In February 2023, Bonomo became the first player in poker history to surpass US$60 million in tracked live tournament earnings.

At the World Series of Poker, Bonomo has more than 77 cashes, made 23 final tables, and has won three bracelets and one circuit ring for more than US$18 million in winnings. His first bracelet came in 2014 in Event #11: No-Limit Hold'em Six Handed, earning $449,980. Bonomo came in second in the previous event in which he played, Event #5: Limit 2-7 Triple Draw Lowball. This was his third runner-up finish at the WSOP, after one in 2008 and 2011, after which he lamented on Twitter, "Always a bride's maid, never a bride."

At the 2018 WSOP, Bonomo won Event #16, the $10,000 Heads-Up No-Limit Hold'em Championship with a prize of $185,965. He followed this up by winning Event #78, the $1,000,000 One Drop for $10,000,000. With this victory, Bonomo temporarily overtook Daniel Negreanu as number 1 on the all time live tournament money list, until being surpassed by Bryn Kenney in August 2019, then surpassing Kenney again in July 2022.

== World Series of Poker ==
World Series of Poker bracelets
Year	Event	Prize money
2014	$1,500 No Limit Hold'em Six Handed	$449,980
2018	$10,000 Heads Up No Limit Hold'em Championship	$185,965
2018	$1,000,000 No Limit Hold'em The Big One for One Drop	$10,000,000

== Super High Rollers ==
Justin Bonomo is a regular face on the High Roller circuit. In May 2018, he won the $300,000 Super High Roller Bowl for $5,000,000. He has won events such as the Triton High Roller Series, PokerStars Caribbean Adventure, Super High Roller Bowls in China and Las Vegas, and is a regular at the ARIA High Roller Events.

In December 2024, Bonomo finished seventh at the WSOP Paradise Super Main Event in the Bahamas for US$1,300,000, his most recent tracked live tournament cash.

=== Triton Poker Series ===
Festival	Tournament	Prize
Jeju 2019	250K HKD Short Deck Ante-Only	HKD 4,600,000
London 2019	£100K Short Deck Main Event	£2,670,000

=== Poker GO Tour Titles ===
Year	Tournament	Prize
2021	ARIA High Roller #31 - $10,000 NLH	$171,000
2021	Bellagio High Roller #2 - $100,000 NLH	$928,200
2021	Bellagio High Roller #5 - $10,000 NLH	$128,000
2022	ARIA High Roller #16 - $10,000 NLH	$124,200
2022	Bellagio High Roller #5 - $10,000 NLH	$75,792
2022	Bellagio High Roller #11 - $25,000 NLH	$229,500
2022	ARIA High Roller #35 – $10,000 NLH	$119,600
2023	Poker Masters #9 - $25,000 NLH	$333,000

== Online poker ==
Bonomo was caught entering major online poker tournaments using multiple accounts in 2006 on Partypoker. He was temporarily suspended from two sites and tens of thousands of dollars were seized.

Bonomo was a sponsored member of Team Bodog until January 2010.

== Public disputes ==
In September 2020, German high-stakes professional Benjamin "bencb789" Rolle publicly questioned on social media whether Bonomo had used real-time solver assistance during a $25,000 WPT High Roller Championship hand, in which Bonomo tanked for approximately 45 seconds before making an unusual overcall with K-J suited against two all-in opponents. Bonomo stated the same day that he had spent the time calculating pot odds. No formal investigation followed and no evidence of solver-assistance use was ever produced.

== Personal life ==
Justin Bonomo lives in Las Vegas in the Panorama Towers, residence to more than 70 professional poker players. He is originally from Fairfax, Virginia.

Bonomo practices polyamory.

He donated $13,250 to the SENS project, a life extension research project.

At the December 2024 WSOP Paradise Super Main Event in the Bahamas, Bonomo wore a Palestinian keffiyeh as a show of solidarity with Palestine while among the final 15 players. Tournament officials deemed the garment a prohibited political item under televised-broadcast rules and threatened him with disqualification. Bonomo removed the keffiyeh and continued in the event, finishing seventh for US$1,300,000.
