= Dan Colman =

American poker player (born 1990)

Daniel Alan Colman
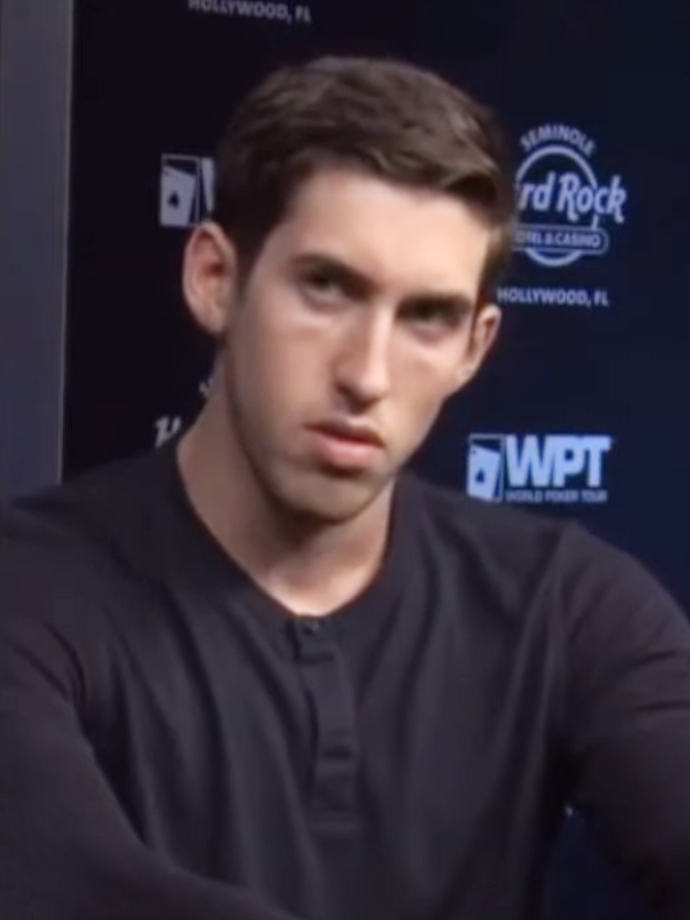
- Colman in 2017
- Nickname: mrGR33N13
- Born: July 11, 1990 (age 36); Holden, Massachusetts, U.S.

World Series of Poker
- Bracelet: 1
- Money finishes: 9
- Highest WSOP Main Event finish: 31st, 2016

World Poker Tour
- Title: None
- Final tables: 3
- Money finishes: 6

Daniel Alan Colman (born July 11, 1990) is an American high-stakes professional poker player, originally from Holden, Massachusetts. He is best known for winning the $1,000,000 buy-in Big One for One Drop at the 2014 World Series of Poker. He beat Daniel Negreanu heads-up for a first place prize of $15,306,668, the fourth largest single payout in poker tournament history.

== Poker career ==
Colman is primarily an online player under the names "mrGR33N13" and "riyyc225". In 2013 he became the first player in history to win $1,000,000 in hyper-turbo tournaments in a calendar year, accomplishing the feat in only nine months. In April 2014 he won the €100,000 Super High Roller at the European Poker Tour Grand Final in Monte Carlo, earning €1,539,300.

At the 2014 WSOP, Colman finished in third place in the $10,000 Heads-Up event, before winning The Big One for One Drop for $15,306,668.

Colman added two more seven-figure cashes that summer. First, he finished second in the €50,000 Super High Roller at EPT 2014 for €843,066 ($1,120,186), then in September he won the Seminole Hard Rock Poker Open, prevailing over a field of 1,499 and winning $1,446,710. In October 2014 he won the WPT Alpha 8 super high roller for $990,000, bringing his live tournament cashes to 21 million in 2014.

In 2014, he won the BLUFF Player of the year award.

As of May 2021, his total live winnings exceeded $28,900,000.

== World Series of Poker Bracelets ==
Year	Tournament	Prize (US$)
2014	The Big One for One Drop	$15,306,668

== Awards ==
- ALL IN Magazine 2014 Poker Player of the Year
- Card Player Magazine 2014 Player of the Year Award
- Bluff Magazine 2014 Player of the Year Award
