= Dutch Boyd =

American poker player (born 1980)

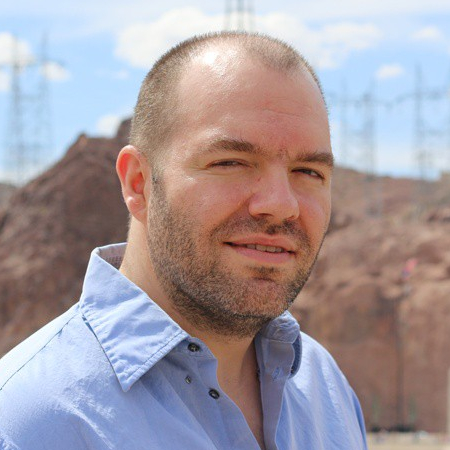
- Boyd in 2015
- Nickname: Dutch
- Born: Russell Aaron Boyd; December 24, 1980 (age 45)

World Series of Poker
- Bracelets: 3
- Money finishes: 40
- Highest WSOP Main Event finish: 12th, 2003

World Poker Tour
- Title: None
- Final table: None
- Money finishes: 5

Russell Aaron Boyd (born December 24, 1980), commonly known as Dutch Boyd, is an American professional poker player from Culver City, California (originally from Columbia, Missouri).

Inspired by the 1998 movie Rounders, Boyd began playing online poker day and night through his last year of law school. After graduating law school, Boyd moved to California and began playing poker during the day and working for a department store at night. During this time, Boyd and his brother decided to begin an online casino specializing in poker. He raised $50,000 from family and friends and began the PokerSpot website, which would eventually fail and spark controversy. After the failure of PokerSpot, Boyd suffered from a series of self-alleged mental problems, eventually leading to his commitment for a short time in Antigua.

== Personal life ==
Boyd lives in Las Vegas and is in a long term relationship with his girlfriend Michelle.

== Poker career ==
=== World Series of Poker ===
Boyd received substantial media attention during his deep run on the 2003 World Series of Poker Main Event, where he finished in 12th place. He was involved in a key hand late in the tournament with Chris Moneymaker. Boyd held KQ and Moneymaker had pocket 3s. After the 9 2 5 flop had missed Boyd, Moneymaker bet 100,000 chips, and Dutch forced him all-in on a bluff. Moneymaker thought for a while about calling, but eventually did put his tournament life on the line. Boyd did not improve on his over cards and was left with a very small stack. Boyd would go down in 12th place not long after the hand, and Moneymaker would go on to win the tournament. Shortly after this, he founded a group of young poker players called The Crew that achieved notable success. In addition to playing poker professionally, Boyd attempted to establish another online poker room which charged players a monthly membership fee rather than rake in order to play. Boyd's new endeavor would not materialize.

Boyd has won three WSOP bracelets in his career. His first came in the 2006 World Series of Poker, where he won a $2,500 buy-in No-Limit Hold'em Six Max event for $475,712, his largest tournament win to date. He won his second in 2010 in a $2,500 Limit Hold'em/Six Handed event, and his third in 2014 in a $1,000 No-Limit Hold'em event.

=== Other poker ventures ===
In 2007, Boyd won a $1,000 buy-in event at the Five Diamond World Poker Classic for a $237,685 prize.

=== Poker earnings ===
As of June 2026, Boyd's total live tournament winnings exceed $2.9 million. His 69 cashes at the WSOP account for over $1,900,000 of those winnings.

==== World Series of Poker bracelets ====
| Year | Tournament | Prize (US$) |
|---|---|---|
| 2006 | $2,500 Short Handed No Limit Hold'em | $475,712 |
| 2010 | $2,500 Limit Hold'em/Six Handed | $234,065 |
| 2014 | $1,000 No-Limit Hold'em | $288,744 |

=== Online poker ===
==== PokerSpot controversy ====
Prior to his professional poker career, Boyd was the president and co-founder of the PokerSpot online poker cardroom, which operated from May 2000 to late 2001. PokerSpot was based out of Antigua, but Boyd never obtained an Antiguan gaming license for the cardroom. When PokerSpot ceased operations, the cardroom did not refund $400,000 of player funds. A substantial controversy has arisen from actions taken by Boyd and the staff of PokerSpot during this time.

According to Boyd, in January 2001, PokerSpot's credit card processor was late in transferring player funds to PokerSpot. As a result, PokerSpot did not have all the player funds that were being used at their site. Eventually this resulted in PokerSpot being shorted six weeks of credit card deposits, which PokerSpot could not cover. Players were unable to cash out, and eventually the site shut down.

When financial problems began with PokerSpot, players who called PokerSpot customer support requesting withdrawal of their deposited funds were told many different stories, ranging from a 30-business-day hold to a promise that their checks were "already in the mail." In an online newsgroup in November 2002, Boyd admitted that players had been deceived. Boyd stated that he told his Customer Support staff to, "... spin it so that the players don't feel the need to make a mad rush on the cardroom OR the need to tell everyone they know that PokerSpot [is] going to hell in a handbasket. Spin it so that the players continue to just keep on playing."

Boyd also angered many players by regularly sending e-mails and posting on the rec.gambling.poker newsgroup in 2000 and 2001, stating that PokerSpot would "make good on all pending cashouts." As of May 2021, this promise has not been fulfilled.

There is a disagreement regarding a potential PokerSpot buyout offer that might have refunded all money deposited by former PokerSpot players. Burton Ritchie posted an open letter on RGP in January 2003 stating the details of the buyout offer, which included the paying off of existing debts and a $200,000 payday and 10% equity stake for Boyd in the new company. While defending himself against Ritchie's claims, Boyd subsequently acknowledged that he had indeed backed out of a deal with Ritchie to pursue a better deal with Golden Palace. Boyd claims that Golden Palace backed out of their deal, which lead Boyd to try and revisit the Ritchie deal, only to find that Ritchie was no longer interested. In a newsgroup posting in 2007, Russ's brother Robert Boyd claimed that CyberWorld Group/Golden Palace reneged after hiring away PokerSpot's lead developer.

=== Two Plus Two lawsuit ===
In December 2009, Two Plus Two Publishing, a poker publisher founded by Mason Malmuth, filed a lawsuit in federal court in Las Vegas alleging that Boyd and his co-defendant, Jacksname.com, took actions that “have disrupted or are intended to disrupt Two Plus Two’s business by, among other things, diverting web users away from Two Plus Two’s Web sites and forums". Boyd allegedly registered a domain name using the phrase "Two Plus Two" and the word "poker” and later linked the domain name to a poker strategy and gaming services website.

Boyd’s response to the lawsuit was that it is "without merit and is designed to encourage me to pay him [Malmuth] off or face a substantial legal bill defending myself against it."

Two Plus Two Publishing's Motion for Partial Summary Judgment was granted by Judge Kent J. Dawson on March 1, 2012. Statutory damages in the amount of $25,000 were awarded to the plaintiff, and attorney’s fees and costs were awarded in the amount of $33,985.45.

=== Poker Tilt book ===
In March 2013, Boyd announced his first poker book titled Poker Tilt, co-authored by Laurence Samuels. Boyd used the crowdfunding platform Kickstarter to fund publishing the book.

=== Twitch ===
Apart from playing poker and writing about it, Boyd also Vlogs about it and has a Twitch channel.
