= Brandon Shack-Harris =

American poker player (born 1981)

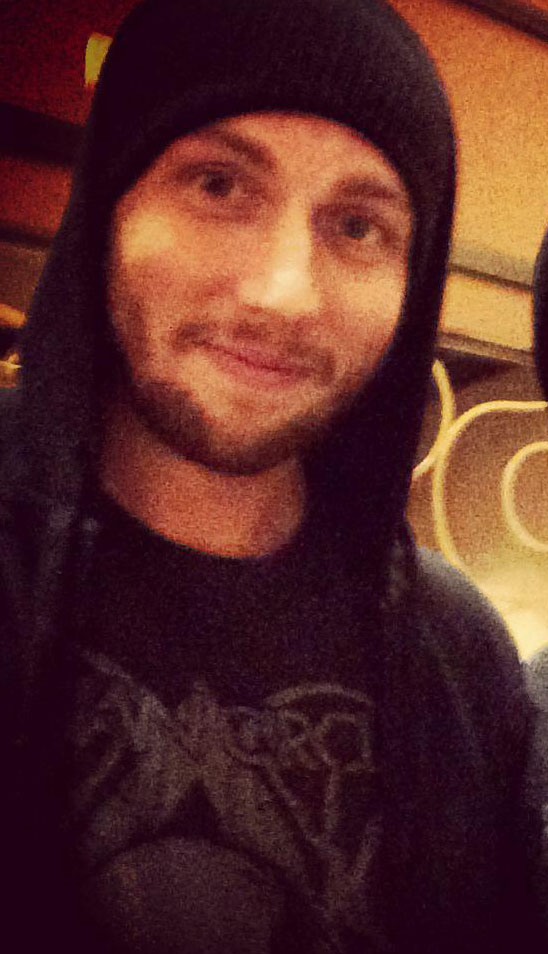
- Born: April 5, 1981 (age 45)

World Series of Poker
- Bracelets: 2
- Final tables: 13
- Money finishes: 40

Brandon Shack-Harris is a professional poker player who has won two World Series of Poker bracelets. He was born in Racine, Wisconsin and is based in Chicago. Shack-Harris developed his skills in cash games at the Horseshoe Hammond. As of 2020, his total live tournament winnings exceed $3,325,000.

== World Series of Poker ==
Shack-Harris won his first bracelet in the 1,128-player 2014 Event #3: $1,000 Pot Limit Omaha for $205,634. It was the first $1,000 buy-in Pot Limit Omaha event and the largest non-No Limit Hold'em field in the history of the World Series of Poker. His second bracelet came in the 400-player 2016 Event #51 – $10,000 Eight-Handed Pot Limit Omaha 8-Handed World Championship. He defeated Loren Klein heads-up to win the bracelet and $894,300.

World Series of Poker bracelets
Year	Tournament	Prize (US$)
2014	$1,000 Pot-Limit Omaha	$205,634
2016	$10,000 Pot-Limit Omaha 8-Handed Championship	$894,300
