= Dan Heimiller =

American poker player (born 1962)

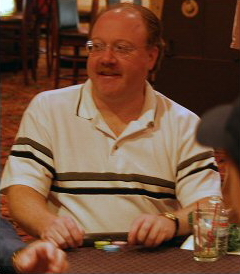
- Heimiller at the WPPA Tournament of Champions
- Born: June 25, 1962 (age 64)

World Series of Poker
- Bracelets: 3
- Final tables: 15
- Money finishes: 91
- Highest WSOP Main Event finish: 43rd, 2002

World Poker Tour
- Title: None
- Final tables: 3
- Money finishes: 15

European Poker Tour
- Title: None
- Final table: 1
- Money finish: 1

Daniel Heimiller (born June 25, 1962) is an American professional poker player who won the Limit Hold'em & Seven-Card Stud event at the 2002 World Series of Poker and the Seniors No-Limit Hold'em Championship in 2014. He has at least one WSOP cash for 25 consecutive years (1997-2021). He is ranked 5th in all time number of live tournament cashes and 12th in all time number of WSOP cashes.

Heimiller was born in California and raised in Livonia, Michigan. At one time he was a Las Vegas Cab driver as well as an industrial engineer. For over 30 years he has been playing a variety of poker events which includes the World Series of Poker (WSOP), the World Poker Tour (WPT) and the Professional Poker Tour (PPT). Dan Heimiller won Best All Around Player at the Commerce Casino in 1999. He has won 42 of the 417 tournaments he cashed in, and in one two-year period, Heimiller won nine tournaments and appeared at 33 final tables.

== World Series of Poker ==
Heimiller has won three WSOP bracelets. The first was at the 2002 World Series of Poker in the $2,000 buy-in Limit Hold'em & Seven-card stud event, defeating fellow professional poker player Ram Vaswani during heads-up play; the final table at the event also included such notables as Paul McKinney and Max Stern. The second was at the 2014 World Series of Poker, where Heimiller won the $1,000 Seniors Championship event, defeating a then-record field of 4,425 players to win $627,462, along with the bracelet. He also has two WSOP Circuit Rings among his 12 Circuit cashes. Heimiller has cashed 91 times at the WSOP with an additional 17 cashes in WSOP Circuit, APAC and WSOP Online. In addition to his two bracelet wins, Heimiller has also made 18 other WSOP final tables, which includes two runner-up finishes. The first was in the 2001 World Series of Poker $1,500 Seven Card Stud Hi-Lo event, where he was bested by Barry Shulman, and the second was in the 2010 World Series of Poker $1,500 Omaha Hi-Lo event. Heimiller has also cashed seven times in the WSOP Main Event: in 2002, 2006, 2007, 2016, 2018, 2019, and 2021. He won his third career bracelet in a $1,500 Seven Card Stud event at the 2025 WSOP.

=== World Series of Poker bracelets ===
| Year | Event | Prize Money |
|---|---|---|
| 2002 | $2,000 Limit Hold'em & Seven-Card Stud | $108,300 |
| 2014 | $1,000 Seniors No Limit Hold'em Championship | $627,462 |
| 2025 | $1,500 Seven Card Stud | $106,840 |

=== World Championship of Online Poker ===
Heimiller, playing under the PokerStars screen name "Lenny", won a World Championship of Online Poker (WCOOP) bracelet from the 2003 WCOOP $300 buy-in Pot Limit Omaha High-Low event.

== Other poker events ==
Heimiller has cashed fifteen times at the World Poker Tour, with his biggest cash being the 2008 Borgata Poker Open, where he finished in third place for $387,500. He also finished fifth in a Professional Poker Tour event for $30,000. At the 2009 European Poker Tour's PokerStars Caribbean Adventure, Heimiller made the final table and finished in seventh place, earning $300,000.

As of 2025, his total live tournament winnings exceed $7,990,000. His WSOP and related cashes account for over $3,435,000 of those winnings.
