= Paul Newey =

English businessman and poker player (born 1968)

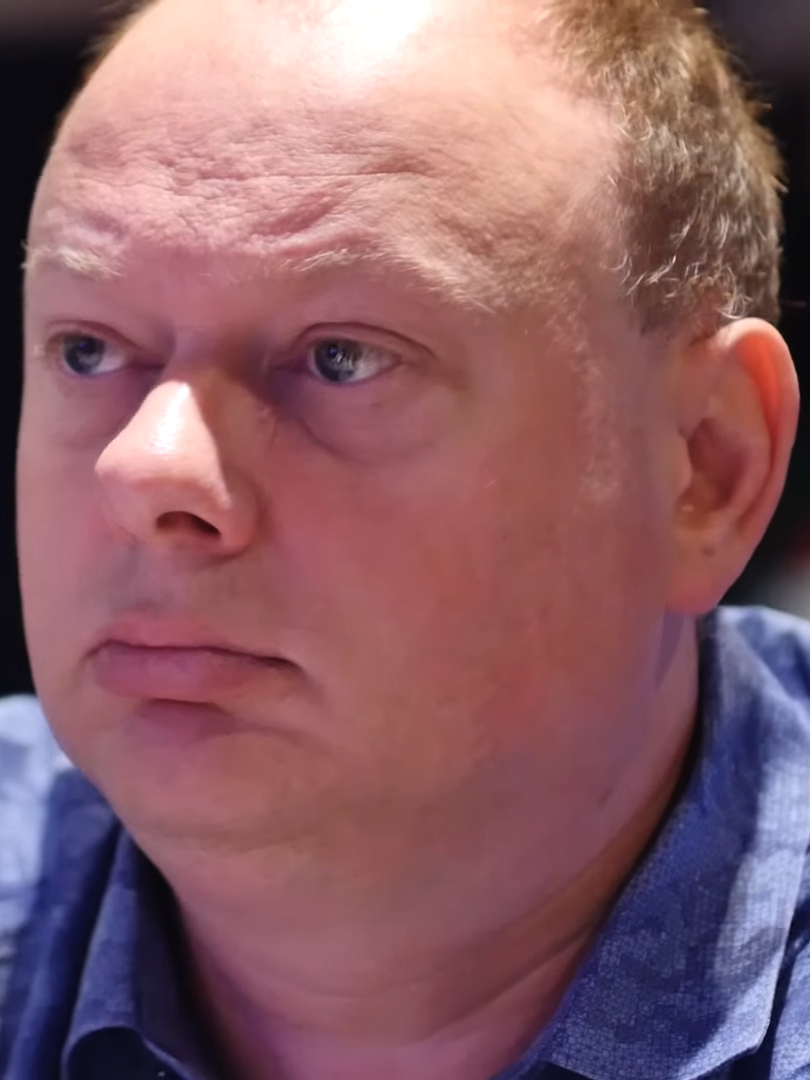
- Paul Newey in 2017
- Born: 6 September 1968 (age 58)

World Series of Poker
- Bracelet: None
- Final table: 1
- Money finishes: 4
- Highest WSOP Main Event finish: 726th, 2016

World Poker Tour
- Title: None
- Final table: 1
- Money finish: 1

European Poker Tour
- Title: None
- Final tables: 6
- Money finishes: 14

Paul Newey (born 6 September 1968) is an English businessman and semi-professional poker player from Dorset, England who co-founded Ocean Finance and later New Wave Ventures.

== Career ==
In 1991, Newey co-founded Ocean Finance, a loan and mortgage business, in Staffordshire, United Kingdom. He sold the company in 2006 and left his CEO position in 2009. He later co-founded New Wave Ventures a privately owned investment fund located at Adam House in London.

Newey has made the Birmingham Post rich list in 2013, 2015 and 2017 ranking 28th, 17th and 20th respectively. At the end of 2017 his net worth was estimated at $335 million.

== Gambling ==
Newey is an avid gambler. On 4 January 2005 Newey nearly broke the bank at Birmingham's Genting Casino Star City where he won £3 million and forced owner Stanley Leisure to issue a profit warning. The casino value declined by 12% as a result of Newey's win. Newey lost his winnings later that month.

In 2014, Newey won four times at the $5,000-a-spin machines in Aria Casino located in Las Vegas for a total of $1.75 million.

=== Poker ===
Newey began playing high stakes poker tournaments in 2012 after entering the $1,000,000 Big One for One Drop event at the World Series of Poker. Newey was eliminated without cashing on Day 2 by eventual champion Antonio Esfandiari.

In 2014, Newey again entered the $1,000,000 One Drop event; this time, he finished 7th, earning $1,418,667. Newey has had success in the poker world. As of 2018, Newey has cashed for over $4,800,000.

Newey plays online under the alias "topdoll827".
