= Tom Franklin (poker player) =

American poker player (born 1950)

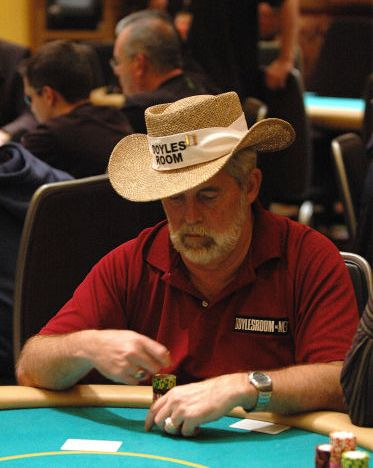
- Franklin in the 2006 World Series of Poker
- Nickname: Captain Tom
- Born: October 23, 1950 (age 76); Fresno, California, U.S.

World Series of Poker
- Bracelet: 1
- Money finishes: 28
- Highest WSOP Main Event finish: 7th, 1995

World Poker Tour
- Final table: 1
- Money finishes: 7

European Poker Tour
- Money finish: 1

"Captain" Tom Franklin (born October 23, 1950) is an American professional poker player born in Fresno, California.

Franklin's first cash at the World Series of Poker (WSOP) took place in 1990, finishing 24th in the $10,000 no limit hold'em Main Event. Franklin won his only WSOP bracelet in 1999 in the $2,500 limit Omaha event for $104,000.

In 2005, Franklin won a preliminary No Limit Holdem event at the Bellagio Casino's Five Diamond Classic, picking up $434,025 for the win.

As of 2019, his total live tournament winnings exceed $3,200,000. His 28 cashes at the WSOP account for $985,084 of those winnings.
