= Anthony Gregg =

American poker player (born 1986)

- Nickname: Tony
- Born: 1986 (age 39–40); Columbia, Maryland

World Series of Poker
- Bracelet: 1
- Final tables: 3
- Money finishes: 20
- Highest WSOP Main Event finish: 11th, 2025

World Poker Tour
- Title: 1
- Final table: 1
- Money finishes: 8

European Poker Tour
- Title: None
- Final tables: 3
- Money finishes: 3

Anthony "Tony" Gregg (born 1986) is an American professional poker player best known for winning the $111,111 One Drop High Roller in 2013 for a prize of $4,830,000. He is also known for his great successes at the PCA where he has made a record three appearances at the main event final table before anybody else has made the final table on two occasions. Despite making the final table three times he has not won a main event falling short and finishing 2nd on two of the three occasions and finishing sixth at the other final table. During his career he has racked up a total of over $12.5 million in live tournament cashes.

Gregg played Magic: The Gathering before turning to poker.

== World Series of Poker ==
World Series of Poker bracelets
| Year | Event | Prize money |
|---|---|---|
| 2013 | $111,111 High Roller for One-Drop Hold'em | $4,830,619 |
