= Buying in (poker) =

Entering a tournament with an up-front payment

In poker and gaming, "buying in" is the process of entering a tournament that requires an up-front payment. The size of the payment, otherwise known as the "buy in", determines the total winning prize pool and also contains a fee, otherwise known as the rake, that is paid to the house.

== Cash‑game buy‑ins ==
=== Minimum and maximum ===
Most card‑rooms post both a minimum and maximum buy‑in tied to the blind level. Robert’s Rules of Poker - a widely adopted rule set - defines a “full buy‑in” for no‑limit or pot‑limit games as 40 × the big blind and for limit games as 10 × the maximum bet.

Online card‑rooms use similar ranges: PokerStars standard ring‑game matrix lists 40 bb min / 100 bb max for no‑limit hold’em stakes from $0.05/$0.10 upward. Live rooms often widen the cap - e.g., $1/$2 games permitting up to 300 bb—to satisfy “deep‑stack” demand.

=== Reloads and top‑ups ===
A player may rebuy (add chips) between hands at any time, provided the resulting stack does not exceed the posted maximum, and may top up to match the table maximum after losing chips.

== Tournament buy‑ins ==
=== Entry‑fee structure ===
Tournament advertising typically shows the buy‑in as ‘‘Prize Pool + Fee’’ (for example, $200 + $40) where the second figure covers house expenses and staff gratuities. The Poker Tournament Directors Association requires alternates, late registrants and re‑entries to receive “full stacks” at the time of purchase.

At the World Series of Poker the Main Event maintains the long‑standing US $10 000 buy‑in; 4.9 % of the entry pool is withheld as fees and 2.1 % for staff, per the 2024 structure sheet.

=== Rebuys, add‑ons and re‑entries ===
- A rebuy allows a seated, short‑stacked or eliminated player to purchase another full starting stack during a predefined period.
- An add‑on is an optional one‑time purchase - usually at the end of the rebuy period - for extra chips, regardless of current stack.
- In a re‑entry event a busted player must leave the table, then re‑register (often being assigned a new seat) to receive a fresh stack; the new payment is identical to the initial buy‑in.
