= Tobias Reinkemeier =

German poker player (born 1987)

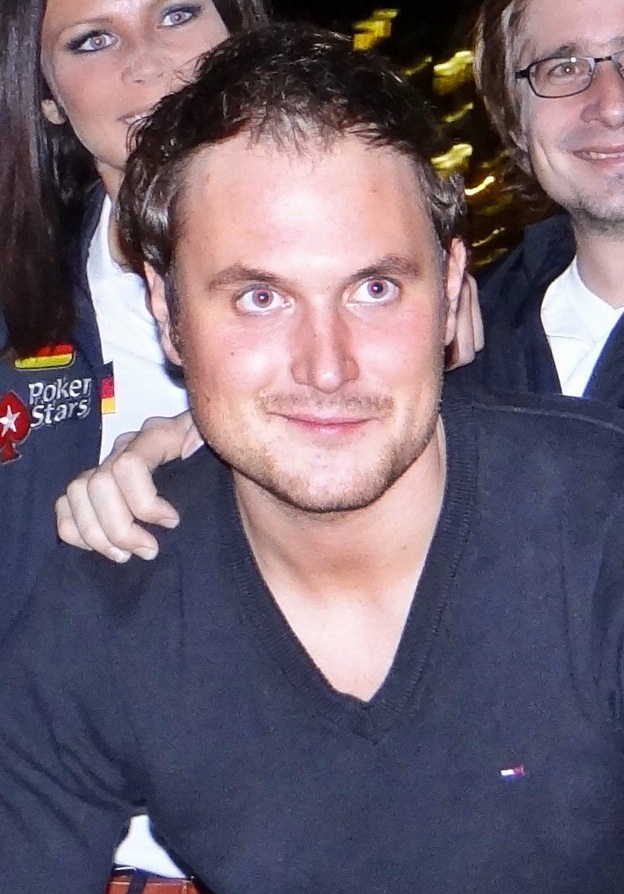
- Tobias Reinkemeier (2011)
- Nickname: PokerNoob999
- Born: 7 April 1987 (age 39); Cuxhaven, Germany

World Series of Poker
- Money finishes: 4

World Poker Tour
- Money finishes: 3

European Poker Tour
- Money finishes: 11

Tobias Reinkemeier (born 7 April 1987) is a German professional poker player from Cuxhaven.

== Poker ==
Reinkemeier began playing poker in 2006 and started playing live tournaments in 2007 with small cashes.

In 2010, Reinkemeier won the EPT €25,000 High Roller event for €965,000. Reinkemeier finished 5th in the 2014 WSOP $1,000,000 Big One for One Drop event, earning $2,053,334.

Reinkemeier plays online under the nickname PokerNoob999. He won 29 May 2011 Sunday Millions on PokerStars for $135,053. As of 2016, Reinkemeier's live tournament winnings exceed $10,500,000 putting him 3rd on the German all time money list behind Fedor Holz and Ole Schemion.

== Personal life ==
Reinkemeier was born in Germany and currently resides in London.
