= Bryn Kenney =

American poker player (born 1986)

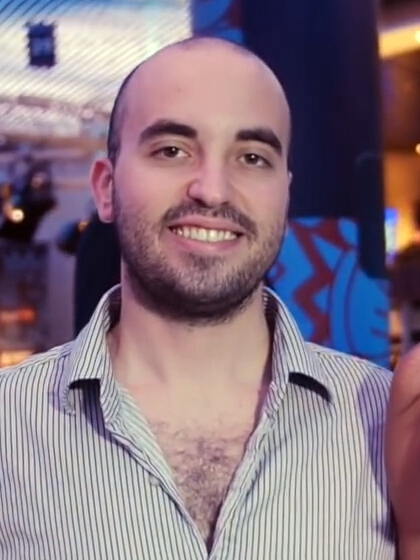
- Born: November 1, 1986 (age 40)
- Actor: The Chosen One
World Series of Poker
- Bracelets: 2
- Final tables: 10
- Money finishes: 50
- Highest WSOP Main Event finish: 28th, 2010
World Poker Tour
- Final tables: 2
- Money finishes: 10
European Poker Tour
- Money finishes: 43

Bryn Kenney (born November 1, 1986) is an American professional poker player from Long Beach, New York.

== Poker career ==
Kenney played Magic: The Gathering competitively before transitioning to poker. His first major live cash was in 2007 at the East Coast Poker Championships in Verona. In the 2010 WSOP, Kenney recorded his first major cash in the $25,000 No Limit Hold'em - Six Handed event, finishing 8th for $141,168. He followed that up with a 28th place finish in the Main Event for $255,242. In January 2011, he recorded his largest cash at the time with a 3rd place finish in the $100,000 No Limit Hold'em - Super High Roller Event at the PokerStars Caribbean Adventure for $643,000.

Kenney won his first WSOP bracelet in 2014 after winning the $1,500 10-Game Mix Six Handed event, which earned him $153,220. In January 2015, he earned $873,880 for a 3rd place finish in the $100,000 #1 No Limit Hold'em - Super High Roller 8 Handed Event at the PokerStars Caribbean Adventure. In the 2015 WSOP, he had a runner-up finish in a $5,000 No Limit Hold'em event for $287,870.

In 2016, Kenney defeated 2015 World Series of Poker Main Event champion, Joe McKeehen heads-up at the Pokerstars Caribbean Adventure $100,000 Super High Roller event winning $1,687,800. Later that year, he won a $25,000 No Limit Hold'em HIgh Roller Event at the Aria High Holler 27 in Las Vegas for $422,400. In the 2016 Super HIgh Roller Bowl in Las Vegas, he finished sixth for $800,000 in a No Limit Hold'em event. In November 2016, at the Triton Poker Super High Rollers, he finished runner-up in the Main Event for $1,401,694 (HK$ 10,870,700).

In January 2017, Kenney won the $50,000 No Limit Hold'em event at the PokerStars Championship Bahamas for $969,075. In April, he won the € 100,000 No Limit Hold'em - Super High Roller Eight Max Event at the PokerStars Championship in Monte Carlo for €1,784,500. At the 2017 Poker Masters in Las Vegas, Kenney won a $50,000 No Limit Hold'em event for $960,000.

In March 2018, Kenney won $1,484,024 (HK$ 11,640,000) with a 5th place finish at the Super High Roller Bowl Event in Macau. That same year, he joined the GGPoker team. In January 2019, he won $914,616 with a victory in the No Limit Hold'em Main Event at the Aussie Millions Poker Championship in Melbourne. At the 2019 Triton Poker Super High Roller Series in Montenegro, he recorded three consecutive seven-figure cashes with two victories and a runner-up finish totaling over $7,200,000.

In August 2019, after placing 2nd to Aaron Zang in the £1,050,000 No-Limit Hold'em - Triton Million for Charity Event, Kenney received the largest single payout in live poker tournament history of £16,890,509 ($20,563,324). The tournament had the largest scheduled single payout in poker tournament history with first place receiving £19,000,000 ($23,100,000). However, due to a prize splitting deal agreed with Zang, Kenney ended up receiving £16,890,509 ($20,563,324) for 2nd while Zang received the smaller prize of £13,779,491 ($16,775,820) for winning the tournament. The deal was made when the tournament entered heads up with Kenney holding an over 5:1 chip lead against Zang. Zang made a comeback and eventually won the tournament.

In November 2021, Kenney finished runner-up in the $25,500 No Limit Hold'em - High Roller Event at the World Poker Tour Rock 'N' Roll Poker Open in Hollywood for $503,880. In August 2023, at the Triton Poker Super High Roller Series in London, Kenney won the $250,000 Luxon Invitational for $6,860,000.

Kenney is ranked 1st on the Hendon Mob All-Time Money List as of 2024. As of 2026, his live tournament winnings exceed $90,000,000. In December 2025, he became the first poker player to surpass $80 million in live tournament earnings.

=== World Series of Poker ===
World Series of Poker bracelets
Year	Event	Prize money
2014	$1,500 10-Game Mix Six Handed	$153,220
2024 O	$2,100 Bounty NLH Championship	$228,983

=== Triton Poker Series ===
Festival	Tournament	Prize
Montenegro 2019	500K HKD NLH 6 - Handed	HKD 11,230,000
Montenegro 2019	1M HKD No-Limit Holdem Main Event	HKD 21,300,000
London 2023	$250k NLH Luxon Invitational	$6,860,000
Monte-Carlo 2024	$125K NLH Main Event	$4,410,000
Jeju 2025	$50K NLH Turbo Bounty Quattro	$839,000 + $480,000 bounty
