= 2024 PokerGO Tour =

2024 PokerGO Tour season
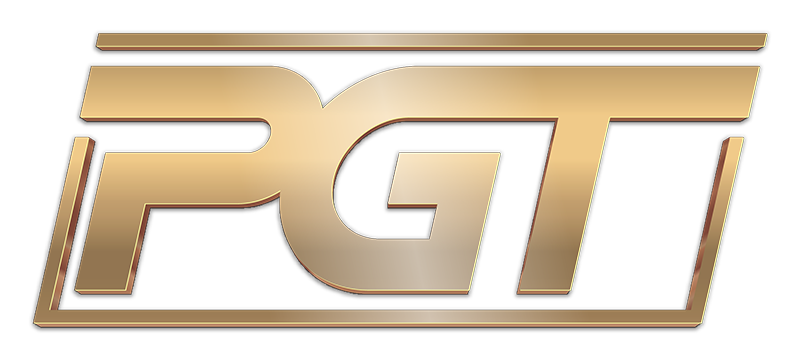
- Duration: January 11, 2024 - January 11, 2025
- Number of official events: 132
- Most wins: (United States) David Coleman (4) (United States) Dylan Weisman (4)
- 2024 PokerGO Tour Player of the Year: (United States) Jeremy Ausmus (2,966 PGT Points)
- 2024 PokerGO Tour Money Leader: (United States) Jonathan Tamayo ($10,226,400)
- 2024 PGT Championship winner: (United States) Jeremy Ausmus ($500,000)

The 2024 PokerGO Tour was the fourth season of the PokerGO Tour. The season runs for 2024 with the first event beginning on January 11.

Continuing on from the 2023 PGT season, the top 40 eligible players and "Dream Seat" winners would compete in the season-ending PGT $1,000,000 Championship once all qualifying PGT tournaments had concluded. Only players with three PGT cashes during the season would be eligible to participate in the PGT Championship.

The PGT $1,000,000 Championship begun on January 10, 2025, with 50 players. Jeremy Ausmus defeated Nick Schulman heads-up to win the $500,000 first-place prize, and was crowned the PGT $1,000,000 Championship winner.

== Leaderboard ==
The top 40 players following the conclusion of all qualifying PokerGO Tour tournaments for 2024 would be invited to play in the season-ending PGT $1,000,000 Championship. The top 40 players on the PGT leaderboard would need to satisfy the new minimum requirement of three PGT cashes during the season to be eligible to play in the PGT $1,000,000 Championship. There would also be a select group of "Dream Seat" winners awarded via special events and promotions to grant players exclusive entry into the PGT $1,000,000 Championship.

Players who qualified via the top 40 would have their starting chips based on their position on the PGT leaderboard, with the minimum being 135 big blinds. Players who won a "Dream Seat" at PGT Last Chance would start with 125 big blinds. Players who won a "Dream Seat" through other promotions would start with 100 big blinds.

The 2024 PGT $1,000,000 Championship was a $1,000,000 freeroll with a $500,000 first-place and payouts for the final six players.

Jeremy Ausmus was crowned the 2024 PGT Player of the Year after accumulating 2,966 PGT points from two wins, 26 cashes, and $5,991,016 in 2024 PGT season earnings.

The leaderboard is published on the PokerGO Tour website.

Note: Leaderboard is correct as of January 11, 2025.

2024 PokerGO Tour Leaderboard
Rank	Player	Points	Wins	Cashes	Earnings
1	(United States) Jeremy Ausmus	2,966	2	26	$5,991,016
2	(Canada) Daniel Negreanu	2,054	3	21	$2,399,106
3	(United States) Seth Davies	1,855	3	9	$5,794,660
4	(United States) Jesse Lonis	1,843	1	17	$2,714,504
5	(United States) Michael Rocco	1,835	1	7	$2,156,811
6	(United States) Jonathan Tamayo	1,776	1	3	$10,226,400
7	(United States) Jim Collopy	1,757	0	21	$2,216,009
8	(United States) Nick Schulman	1,710	2	19	$2,606,433
9	(United States) Aram Zobian	1,707	2	17	$1,627,192
10	(United States) David Coleman	1,637	4	21	$1,352,503

== Schedule ==
The full schedule and results for the 2024 PokerGO Tour is published on the website.

(#/#): The first number is the number of PokerGO Tour titles won in 2024. The second number is the total number of PokerGO Tour titles won. Both numbers represent totals as of that point on the PokerGO Tour.

2024 PokerGO Tour Schedule
PGT #	Start date	Tournament	Buy-in	Type	Venue	Location	Winner	Prize	PGT Points	Entrants	Prize Pool
1	January 11	PGT Kickoff #1	$5,100	No-Limit Hold'em	ARIA Resort & Casino	Las Vegas	(United States) David Coleman (1/1)	$120,150	240	89	$445,000
2	January 12	PGT Kickoff #2	$5,100	No-Limit Hold'em	ARIA Resort & Casino	Las Vegas	(United States) Dylan Weisman (1/3)	$121,500	243	90	$450,000
3	January 13	PGT Kickoff #3	$5,100	No-Limit Hold'em	ARIA Resort & Casino	Las Vegas	(United States) Justin Young (1/2)	$105,850	212	73	$365,000
4	January 14	PGT Kickoff #4	$5,100	No-Limit Hold'em	ARIA Resort & Casino	Las Vegas	(United States) David Coleman (2/2)	$73,800	148	41	$205,000
5	January 15	PGT Kickoff #5	$10,100	No-Limit Hold'em	ARIA Resort & Casino	Las Vegas	(Canada) Kristen Foxen (1/1)	$165,000	330	50	$500,000
6	January 25	PokerGO Cup #1	$5,100	No-Limit Hold'em	ARIA Resort & Casino	Las Vegas	(United States) David Peters (1/6)	$141,525	142	111	$555,000
7	January 26	PokerGO Cup #2	$10,100	No-Limit Hold'em	ARIA Resort & Casino	Las Vegas	(United States) Dylan Weisman (2/4)	$240,300	240	89	$890,000
8	January 27	PokerGO Cup #3	$10,100	No-Limit Hold'em	ARIA Resort & Casino	Las Vegas	(United States) Jonathan Little (1/1)	$229,500	230	85	$850,000
9	January 29	PokerGO Cup #4	$10,100	No-Limit Hold'em	ARIA Resort & Casino	Las Vegas	(United States) Cary Katz (1/6)	$226,800	227	81	$810,000
10	January 30	PokerGO Cup #5	$10,100	No-Limit Hold'em	ARIA Resort & Casino	Las Vegas	(United States) Justin Zaki (1/1)	$232,400	232	83	$830,000
11	January 31	PokerGO Cup #6	$15,100	No-Limit Hold'em	ARIA Resort & Casino	Las Vegas	(United States) David Coleman (3/3)	$302,400	302	63	$945,000
12	February 1	PokerGO Cup #7	$15,100	No-Limit Hold'em	ARIA Resort & Casino	Las Vegas	(United States) David Peters (1/6)	$315,000	315	70	$1,050,000
13	February 2	PokerGO Cup #8	$25,200	No-Limit Hold'em	ARIA Resort & Casino	Las Vegas	(United States) Jonathan Little (2/2)	$453,750	272	55	$1,375,000
14	February 28	PGT Mixed Games #1	$5,100	H.O.R.S.E.	ARIA Resort & Casino	Las Vegas	(Russia) Maksim Pisarenko (1/1)	$117,450	117	87	$435,000
15	February 29	PGT Mixed Games #2	$5,100	8-Game	ARIA Resort & Casino	Las Vegas	(United States) John Hennigan (1/2)	$120,150	120	89	$445,000
16	March 1	PGT Mixed Games #3	$10,200	H.O.R.S.E.	ARIA Resort & Casino	Las Vegas	(United States) Mori Eskandani (1/1)	$201,600	202	63	$630,000
17	March 2	PGT Mixed Games #4	$10,200	8-Game	ARIA Resort & Casino	Las Vegas	(United States) Daniel Zack (1/3)	$195,200	195	61	$610,000
18	March 3	PGT Mixed Games #5	$10,200	Triple Stud	ARIA Resort & Casino	Las Vegas	(United States) John Racener (1/2)	$151,200	151	42	$420,000
19	March 4	PGT Mixed Games #6	$10,200	Triple Draw	ARIA Resort & Casino	Las Vegas	(United States) Jerry Wong (1/2)	$164,500	165	47	$470,000
20	March 5	PGT Mixed Games #7	$10,200	Dealer's Choice	ARIA Resort & Casino	Las Vegas	(United Kingdom) Philip Sternheimer (1/1)	$164,500	165	47	$470,000
21	March 6	PGT Mixed Games #8	$10,200	Big Bet Mix	ARIA Resort & Casino	Las Vegas	(United States) Dan Shak (1/1)	$133,200	133	37	$370,000
22	March 7	PGT Mixed Games #9	$25,300	10-Game	ARIA Resort & Casino	Las Vegas	(Canada) Alex Livingston (1/1)	$324,465	221	41	$1,025,000
23	March 8	PGT Mixed Games #10	$5,100	No-Limit 2-7 Single Draw	ARIA Resort & Casino	Las Vegas	(United States) Walter Chambers (1/1)	$63,000	63	28	$140,000
24	March 20	PGT PLO Series #1	$5,100	Pot-Limit Omaha	ARIA Resort & Casino	Las Vegas	(United States) Allan Le (1/2)	$161,700	162	132	$660,000
25	March 21	PGT PLO Series #2	$7,600	Pot-Limit Omaha	ARIA Resort & Casino	Las Vegas	(Finland) Eelis Parssinen (1/3)	$131,325	175	103	$772,500
26	March 22	PGT PLO Series #3	$5,100	Pot-Limit Omaha	ARIA Resort & Casino	Las Vegas	(Canada) Daniel Negreanu (1/7)	$147,500	148	118	$590,000
27	March 23	PGT PLO Series #4	$10,100	Pot-Limit Omaha	ARIA Resort & Casino	Las Vegas	(Finland) Samuli Siplia (1/1)	$240,300	240	89	$890,000
28	March 24	PGT PLO Series #5	$5,100	Pot-Limit Omaha	ARIA Resort & Casino	Las Vegas	(Netherlands) Ronald Keijzer (1/5)	$80,275	140	139	$695,000
29	March 25	PGT PLO Series #6	$10,100	Pot-Limit Omaha	ARIA Resort & Casino	Las Vegas	(United States) Dylan Weisman (3/5)	$229,500	230	85	$850,000
30	March 26	PGT PLO Series #7	$15,100	Pot-Limit Omaha	ARIA Resort & Casino	Las Vegas	(Finland) Samuli Siplia (1/1)	$159,840	270	74	$1,110,000
31	March 27	PGT PLO Series #8	$15,100	Pot-Limit Omaha	ARIA Resort & Casino	Las Vegas	(Finland) Eelis Parssinen (2/4)	$348,600	349	83	$1,245,000
32	March 28	PGT PLO Series #9	$25,100	Pot-Limit Omaha	ARIA Resort & Casino	Las Vegas	(United States) Seth Davies (1/3)	$522,000	313	72	$1,800,000
33	March 29	PGT PLO Series #10	$5,100	Pot-Limit Omaha	ARIA Resort & Casino	Las Vegas	(United States) James Calderaro (1/1)	$56,700	57	21	$105,000
34	April 8	U.S. Poker Open #1	$5,100	No-Limit Hold'em	ARIA Resort & Casino	Las Vegas	(United States) Erik Seidel (1/3)	$145,000	145	116	$580,000
35	April 9	U.S. Poker Open #2	$10,100	No-Limit Hold'em	ARIA Resort & Casino	Las Vegas	(United States) Jesse Lonis (1/3)	$252,450	252	99	$990,000
36	April 10	U.S. Poker Open #3	$10,100	No-Limit Hold'em	ARIA Resort & Casino	Las Vegas	(United States) Dan Smith (1/5)	$235,200	235	84	$840,000
37	April 11	U.S. Poker Open #4	$10,100	No-Limit Hold'em	ARIA Resort & Casino	Las Vegas	(United States) David Coleman (4/4)	$202,300	232	83	$830,000
38	April 12	U.S. Poker Open #5	$10,100	No-Limit Hold'em	ARIA Resort & Casino	Las Vegas	(United States) Matthew Wantman (1/2)	$239,200	239	92	$920,000
39	April 13	U.S. Poker Open #6	$15,100	No-Limit Hold'em	ARIA Resort & Casino	Las Vegas	(United States) Matthew Wantman (1/2)	$264,290	287	62	$930,000
40	April 15	U.S. Poker Open #7	$15,100	No-Limit Hold'em	ARIA Resort & Casino	Las Vegas	(Canada) Eric Afriat (1/1)	$288,000	288	64	$960,000
41	April 16	U.S. Poker Open #8	$25,200	No-Limit Hold'em	ARIA Resort & Casino	Las Vegas	(United Kingdom) Stephen Chidwick (1/10)	$429,000	257	52	$1,300,000
42	April 25	Texas Poker Open Main Event	$3,300	No-Limit Hold'em	Champions Club Texas	Houston	(China) Ren Lin (1/3)	$400,000	400	735	$2,205,000
43	April 26	Texas Poker Open High Roller #1	$5,100	No-Limit Hold'em	Champions Club Texas	Houston	(United States) Victoria Livschitz (1/3)	$45,500	46	13	$65,000
44	April 27	Texas Poker Open High Roller #2	$5,100	No-Limit Hold'em	Champions Club Texas	Houston	(United States) Aram Zobian (1/3)	$48,600	49	18	$90,000
45	April 28	Texas Poker Open High Roller #3	$5,100	No-Limit Hold'em	Champions Club Texas	Houston	(United States) Daniel Sepiol (1/1)	$53	53	33	$165,000
46	April 29	Texas Poker Open High Roller #4	$5,100	No-Limit Hold'em	Champions Club Texas	Houston	(United States) Clemen Deng (1/2)	$85,750	86	49	$245,000
47	April 30	Texas Poker Open High Roller #5	$5,100	Pot-Limit Omaha	Champions Club Texas	Houston	(United States) Bradley Ruben (1/1)	$115,250	115	105	$525,000
48	May 1	Texas Poker Open High Roller #6	$10,100	No-Limit Hold'em	Champions Club Texas	Houston	(United States) Joey Weissman (1/3)	$116,000	116	29	$290,000
49	May 1	Texas Poker Open High Roller #8	$5,100	Pot-Limit Omaha	Champions Club Texas	Houston	(Azerbaijan) David Mzareulov (1/1)	$68,400	68	38	$190,000
50	May 2	Texas Poker Open High Roller #7	$10,100	Pot-Limit Omaha	Champions Club Texas	Houston	(United States) Isaac Kempton (1/6)	$86,400	86	16	$160,000
51	May 30	WSOP #6	$25,000	No-Limit Hold'em	Horseshoe / Paris	Las Vegas	(United Kingdom) Darius Samual (1/1)	$500,000	300	64	$1,504,000
52	June 1	WSOP #10	$10,000	Omaha Hi-Lo	Horseshoe / Paris	Las Vegas	(United States) Scott Seiver (1/1)	$426,755	427	197	$1,832,100
53	June 3	WSOP #13	$10,000	Dealer's Choice	Horseshoe / Paris	Las Vegas	(United States) Robert Mizrachi (1/1)	$333,045	333	141	$1,311,300
54	June 5	WSOP #19	$10,000	Limit Hold'em	Horseshoe / Paris	Las Vegas	(United States) John Racener (2/3)	$308,930	309	133	$1,236,900
55	June 6	WSOP #21	$25,000	No-Limit Hold'em	Horseshoe / Paris	Las Vegas	(United States) Brekstyn Schutten (1/1)	$1,405,641	700	272	$6,392,000
56	June 7	WSOP #24	$10,000	Pot-Limit Omaha Hi-Lo	Horseshoe / Paris	Las Vegas	(United States) Sean Troha (1/3)	$536,713	537	259	$2,408,700
57	June 9	WSOP #26	$25,000	No-Limit Hold'em	Horseshoe / Paris	Las Vegas	(United States) Nick Schulman (1/5)	$1,667,842	750	318	$7,473,000
58	June 10	WSOP #29	$10,000	2-7 Triple Draw	Horseshoe / Paris	Las Vegas	(United States) Phil Ivey (1/5)	$347,440	347	149	$1,385,700
59	June 13	WSOP #37	$10,000	Big O	Horseshoe / Paris	Las Vegas	(United States) John Fauver (1/1)	$681,998	682	332	$3,087,600
60	June 14	WSOP #39	$50,000	No-Limit Hold'em	Horseshoe / Paris	Las Vegas	(Spain) Sergio Aido (1/2)	$2,026,506	800	177	$8,451,750
61	June 15	WSOP #42	$10,000	Seven Card Stud	Horseshoe / Paris	Las Vegas	(Australia) James Obst (1/1)	$260,658	261	107	$995,100
62	June 17	WSOP #45	$10,000	H.O.R.S.E.	Horseshoe / Paris	Las Vegas	(Russia) Maksim Pisarenko (2/2)	$399,988	400	181	$1,683,300
63	June 18	WSOP #47	$100,000	No-Limit Hold'em	Horseshoe / Paris	Las Vegas	(United States) Chris Hunichen (1/1)	$2,838,389	550	112	$10,836,000
64	June 19	WSOP #50	$10,000	Razz	Horseshoe / Paris	Las Vegas	(United States) George Alexander (1/1)	$282,443	282	118	$1,097,400
65	June 19	ARIA High Roller #1	$5,100	Pot-Limit Omaha	ARIA Resort & Casino	Las Vegas	(Bulgaria) Vasil Medarov (1/1)	$92,000	92	80	$400,000
66	June 20	ARIA High Roller #2	$5,100	Pot-Limit Omaha	ARIA Resort & Casino	Las Vegas	(United States) Tyler Brown (1/1)	$70,950	71	51	$255,000
67	June 21	WSOP #55	$250,000	No-Limit Hold'em	Horseshoe / Paris	Las Vegas	(India) Santhosh Suvarna (1/2)	$5,415,152	800	75	$18,675,000
68	June 22	WSOP #57	$10,000	No-Limit Hold'em	Horseshoe / Paris	Las Vegas	(United States) Frank Funaro (1/1)	$612,997	613	486	$4,519,800
69	June 23	WSOP #58	$50,000	Poker Players Championship	Horseshoe / Paris	Las Vegas	(Canada) Daniel Negreanu (2/8)	$1,178,703	700	89	$4,249,750
70	June 24	ARIA High Roller #3	$10,100	Pot-Limit Omaha	ARIA Resort & Casino	Las Vegas	(India) Kevin Shah (1/1)	$168,300	168	51	$510,000
71	June 25	ARIA High Roller #4	$10,100	Pot-Limit Omaha	ARIA Resort & Casino	Las Vegas	(Bulgaria) Veselin Karakitukov (1/1)	$96,140	96	29	$290,000
72	June 26	WSOP #66	$10,000	Pot-Limit Omaha	Horseshoe / Paris	Las Vegas	(France) Elie Nakache (1/1)	$1,320,945	1,100	811	$7,542,300
73	June 27	ARIA High Roller #5	$10,100	Pot-Limit Omaha	ARIA Resort & Casino	Las Vegas	(Russia) Artur Martirosyan (1/4)	$144,000	144	40	$400,000
74	June 28	WSOP #72	$25,000	No-Limit 2-7 Single Draw	Horseshoe / Paris	Las Vegas	(United States) Scott Seiver (2/2)	$411,041	411	186	$1,729,800
75	June 28	ARIA High Roller #6	$10,100	Pot-Limit Omaha	ARIA Resort & Casino	Las Vegas	(Czech Republic) Patrik Jaros (1/1)	$144,000	144	40	$400,000
76	June 29	WSOP #73	$25,000	Pot-Limit Omaha	Horseshoe / Paris	Las Vegas	(United States) David Eldridge (1/1)	$2,246,728	800	476	$11,186,000
77	June 30	WSOP #74	$10,000	Seven Card Stud Hi-Lo	Horseshoe / Paris	Las Vegas	(United States) Arash Ghaneian (1/1)	$376,476	376	167	$1,553,100
78	July 1	WSOP #76	$10,000	No-Limit Hold'em	Horseshoe / Paris	Las Vegas	(United States) Matthew Lambrecht (1/1)	$1,018,033	1,100	965	$8,974,500
79	July 1	ARIA High Roller #7	$15,100	Pot-Limit Omaha	ARIA Resort & Casino	Las Vegas	(United States) Sam Soverel (1/7)	$155,250	155	23	$345,000
80	July 2	WSOP #79	$50,000	Pot-Limit Omaha	Horseshoe / Paris	Las Vegas	(Germany) Daniel Perkusic (1/1)	$2,100,325	750	187	$8,929,250
81	July 2	ARIA High Roller #8	$5,100	Pot-Limit Omaha	ARIA Resort & Casino	Las Vegas	(Germany) Noah Fischer (1/1)	$92,800	93	58	$290,000
82	July 3	WSOP #81	$10,000	No-Limit Hold'em	Horseshoe / Paris	Las Vegas	(United States) Jonathan Tamayo (1/1)	$10,000,000	1,550	10,112	$94,041,600
83	July 4	ARIA High Roller #9	$10,100	No-Limit Hold'em	ARIA Resort & Casino	Las Vegas	(Brazil) Pedro Padilha (1/1)	$136,000	136	34	$340,000
84	July 5	ARIA High Roller #10	$10,100	No-Limit Hold'em	ARIA Resort & Casino	Las Vegas	(United States) Michael Brinkenhoff (1/2)	$146,454	146	49	$490,000
85	July 6	ARIA High Roller #11	$10,100	No-Limit Hold'em	ARIA Resort & Casino	Las Vegas	(United States) Sam Soverel (2/8)	$108,475	108	42	$420,000
86	July 7	ARIA High Roller #12	$10,100	No-Limit Hold'em	ARIA Resort & Casino	Las Vegas	(Norway) Morten Klein (1/1)	$174,900	175	53	$530,000
87	July 8	ARIA High Roller #13	$10,100	No-Limit Hold'em	ARIA Resort & Casino	Las Vegas	(Russia) Artur Martirosyan (2/5)	$159,224	159	61	$610,000
88	July 10	WSOP #88	$10,000	8-Game	Horseshoe / Paris	Las Vegas	(United States) Calvin Anderson (1/1)	$413,446	413	189	$1,757,700
89	July 12	WSOP #92	$50,000	No-Limit Hold'em	Horseshoe / Paris	Las Vegas	(United States) John Fauver (1/3)	$2,037,947	800	178	$8,499,500
90	July 13	WSOP #94	$10,000	No-Limit Hold'em	Horseshoe / Paris	Las Vegas	(United States) Michael Rocco (1/2)	$924,922	925	502	$4,668,600
91	July 14	WSOP #96	$25,000	H.O.R.S.E.	Horseshoe / Paris	Las Vegas	(China) Xixiang Luo (1/1)	$725,796	435	120	$2,820,000
92	August 17	Super High Roller Series #1	$25,000	No-Limit Hold'em	Merit Royal Hotel & Casino	North Cyprus	(Czech Republic) Roman Hrabec (1/1)	$316,000	190	39	$955,500
93	August 18	Super High Roller Series #2	$25,000	No-Limit Hold'em	Merit Royal Hotel & Casino	North Cyprus	(China) Quan Zhou (1/1)	$316,000	190	39	$955,500
94	August 19	Super High Roller Series #3	$25,000	No-Limit Hold'em	Merit Royal Hotel & Casino	North Cyprus	(Tunisia) Maher Nouira (1/1)	$333,000	200	41	$1,004,500
95	August 20	Super High Roller Series #4	$50,000	No-Limit Hold'em	Merit Royal Hotel & Casino	North Cyprus	(Japan) Masashi Oya (1/2)	$535,000	321	30	$1,470,000
96	August 21	Super High Roller Series #5	$100,000	No-Limit Hold'em	Merit Royal Hotel & Casino	North Cyprus	(Belarus) Maksim Vaskresenski (1/1)	$1,250,000	400	35	$3,430,000
97	August 22	Super High Roller Series #6	$25,000	No-Limit Hold'em	Merit Royal Hotel & Casino	North Cyprus	(Spain) Adrian Mateos (1/5)	$162,000	194	40	$980,000
98	August 23	Super High Roller Bowl IX	$300,000	No-Limit Hold'em	Merit Royal Hotel & Casino	North Cyprus	(United States) Seth Davies (2/4)	$3,206,000	600	24	$7,056,000
99	August 23	Super High Roller Series #8	$25,000	Pot-Limit Omaha	Merit Royal Hotel & Casino	North Cyprus	(Finland) Martin Dam (1/1)	$278,000	167	23	$563,500
100	August 24	Super High Roller Series #9	$50,000	Pot-Limit Omaha	Merit Royal Hotel & Casino	North Cyprus	(Finland) Joni Jouhkimainen (1/1)	$526,900	316	27	$1,323,000
101	August 25	Super High Roller Series #10	$25,000	Pot-Limit Omaha	Merit Royal Hotel & Casino	North Cyprus	(United Kingdom) Richard Gryko (1/1)	$115,000	138	19	$465,500
102	September 14	Poker Masters #1	$5,100	No-Limit Hold'em	ARIA Resort & Casino	Las Vegas	(United States) Spencer Champlin (1/1)	$160,475	160	131	$655,000
103	September 15	Poker Masters #2	$10,100	No-Limit Hold'em	ARIA Resort & Casino	Las Vegas	(United States) Jeremy Becker (1/1)	$255,000	255	100	$1,000,000
104	September 16	Poker Masters #3	$10,100	No-Limit Hold'em	ARIA Resort & Casino	Las Vegas	(United States) Justin Zaki (2/2)	$244,400	244	94	$940,000
105	September 18	Poker Masters #4	$10,100	No-Limit Hold'em	ARIA Resort & Casino	Las Vegas	(United States) Jonathan Little (3/3)	$226,800	227	81	$810,000
106	September 19	Poker Masters #5	$10,100	No-Limit Hold'em	ARIA Resort & Casino	Las Vegas	(United States) David Chen (1/1)	$217,500	218	75	$750,000
107	September 20	Poker Masters #6	$15,100	No-Limit Hold'em	ARIA Resort & Casino	Las Vegas	(United States) Isaac Haxton (1/6)	$352,800	353	84	$1,260,000
108	September 21	Poker Masters #7	$15,100	No-Limit Hold'em	ARIA Resort & Casino	Las Vegas	(United States) Brock Wilson (1/2)	$330,600	331	68	$1,700,000
109	September 18	Poker Masters #8	$25,200	No-Limit Hold'em	ARIA Resort & Casino	Las Vegas	(United States) Ben Tollerene (1/2)	$510,000	306	68	$1,700,000
110	October 14	PGT PLO Series II #1	$5,100	Pot-Limit Omaha	ARIA Resort & Casino	Las Vegas	(Spain) Lautaro Guerra (1/4)	$178,250	178	155	$775,000
111	October 15	PGT PLO Series II #2	$5,100	Pot-Limit Omaha	ARIA Resort & Casino	Las Vegas	(United States) Dylan Weisman (4/6)	$88,245	154	159	$795,000
112	October 16	PGT PLO Series II #3	$5,100	Pot-Limit Omaha	ARIA Resort & Casino	Las Vegas	(United States) Matthew Wantman (2/3)	$178,250	178	155	$775,000
113	October 17	PGT PLO Series II #4	$10,100	Pot-Limit Omaha	ARIA Resort & Casino	Las Vegas	(United States) James Chen (1/1)	$220,000	255	100	$1,000,000
114	October 18	PGT PLO Series II #5	$15,100	Pot-Limit Omaha	ARIA Resort & Casino	Las Vegas	(United States) Isaac Haxton (2/7)	$169,740	289	82	$1,230,000
115	October 19	PGT PLO Series II #6	$10,100	Pot-Limit Omaha	ARIA Resort & Casino	Las Vegas	(Canada) Daniel Negreanu (3/9)	$265,200	265	104	$1,040,000
116	October 20	PGT PLO Series II #7	$15,100	Pot-Limit Omaha	ARIA Resort & Casino	Las Vegas	(United States) Jeremy Ausmus (1/6)	$288,000	288	64	$960,000
117	October 21	PGT PLO Series II #8	$25,200	Pot-Limit Omaha	ARIA Resort & Casino	Las Vegas	(United States) Ben Tollerene (2/3)	$496,000	298	62	$1,550,000
118	October 22	PGT PLO Series II #9	$5,100	Pot-Limit Omaha	ARIA Resort & Casino	Las Vegas	(United States) Anthony Hu (1/2)	$70,560	99	84	$420,000
119	October 24	Super High Roller Bowl: Pot-Limit Omaha	$100,500	Pot-Limit Omaha	ARIA Resort & Casino	Las Vegas	(United States) Seth Davies (3/5)	$1,500,000	450	42	$4,200,000
120	November 4	NAPT Las Vegas Super High Roller	$25,000	No-Limit Hold'em	Resorts World	Las Vegas	(United States) Stephen Song (1/1)	$439,400	264	60	$1,440,600
121	November 8	NAPT Las Vegas High Roller	$10,000	No-Limit Hold'em	Resorts World	Las Vegas	(United States) Sam Soverel (3/9)	$385,750	386	170	$1,649,000
122	November 21	Texas PLO Roundup Main Event	$3,300	Pot-Limit Omaha	Champions Club Texas	Houston	(United States) Lawrence Chang (1/1)	$300,000	300	474	$1,422,000
123	November 22	Texas PLO Roundup High Roller #1	$5,100	Pot-Limit Omaha	Champions Club Texas	Houston	(United States) Adam Hendrix (1/5)	$51,750	52	23	$115,000
124	November 23	Texas PLO Roundup High Roller #2	$5,100	Pot-Limit Omaha	Champions Club Texas	Houston	(Canada) Curtis Muller (1/1)	$54,000	54	20	$100,000
125	November 24	Texas PLO Roundup High Roller #3	$5,100	Pot-Limit Omaha	Champions Club Texas	Houston	(Netherlands) Ronald Keijzer (2/6)	$40,150	40	22	$110,000
126	January 2, 2025	PGT Last Chance #1	$10,100	No-Limit Hold'em	ARIA Resort & Casino	Las Vegas	(United States) Nick Schulman (2/6)	$283,050	283	111	$1,110,000
127	January 3, 2025	PGT Last Chance #2	$10,100	No-Limit Hold'em	ARIA Resort & Casino	Las Vegas	(United States) Shannon Shorr (1/3)	$297,500	298	119	$1,190,000
128	January 4, 2025	PGT Last Chance #3	$10,100	No-Limit Hold'em	ARIA Resort & Casino	Las Vegas	(United States) Brandon Wilson (1/1)	$297,500	298	119	$1,190,000
129	January 6, 2025	PGT Last Chance #4	$10,100	No-Limit Hold'em	ARIA Resort & Casino	Las Vegas	(United States) Brandon Wilson (1/1)	$285,000	285	114	$1,140,000
130	January 7, 2025	PGT Last Chance #5	$10,100	No-Limit Hold'em	ARIA Resort & Casino	Las Vegas	(United States) Martin Zamani (1/3)	$302,500	303	121	$1,210,000
131	January 8, 2025	PGT Last Chance #6	$10,100	No-Limit Hold'em	ARIA Resort & Casino	Las Vegas	(United States) Shannon Shorr (2/4)	$290,000	290	116	$1,160,000
132	January 10, 2025	PGT $1,000,000 Championship	--	No-Limit Hold'em	ARIA Resort & Casino	Las Vegas	(United States) Jeremy Ausmus (2/7)	$500,000	--	50	$1,000,000
