= 2023 PokerGO Tour =

2023 PokerGO Tour season
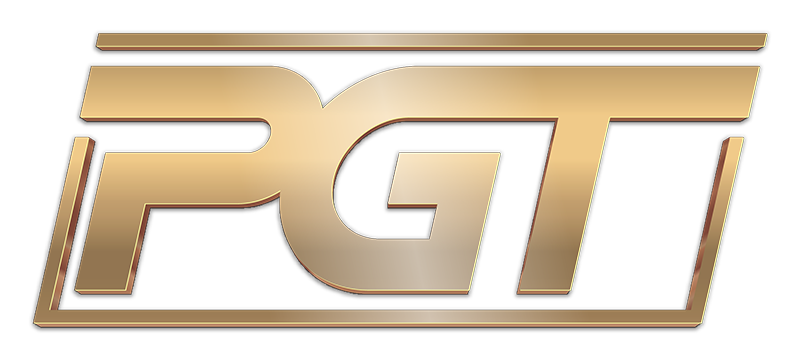
- Duration: January 11, 2023 - January 10, 2024
- Number of official events: 133
- Most wins: (United States) Isaac Haxton (4) (United States) Isaac Kempton (4)
- 2023 PokerGO Tour Player of the Year: (United States) Isaac Haxton (2,847 PGT Points)
- 2023 PokerGO Tour Money Leader: (United States) Daniel Weinman ($12,180,000)
- 2023 PGT Championship winner: (Germany) Daniel Smiljkovic ($500,000)

The 2023 PokerGO Tour was the third season of the PokerGO Tour. The season runs for 2023 with the first event beginning on January 11.

During the 2021 season, the top three finishers were awarded prize money, while in the 2022 season, there was a winner-take-all PGT Championship. For the 2023 season, the top 40 players and "Dream Seat" winners will compete in the season-ending PGT Championship once all qualifying PokerGO Tour tournaments have concluded.

The PGT Championship began on January 9, 2024, with 36 of the 40 eligible players from the Top 40 participating, and 14 Dream Seat winners. Daniel Smiljkovic defeated Arden Cho heads-up to win the $500,000 first-place prize to be crowned the PGT Championship winner.

== Leaderboard ==
The top 40 players following the conclusion of all qualifying PokerGO Tour tournaments for 2023 will be invited to play in the season-ending PGT Championship. In addition to the top 40 players on the PGT leaderboard, there will be a select group of "Dream Seat" winners awarded via special events and promotions to grant players exclusive entry into the PGT Championship. Players will have their starting chips based on how many points they earned during the season with the minimum starting chips being 100 big blinds for all players and Dream Seat winners.

The PGT Championship will be a $1,000,000 freeroll for 2023 with a $500,000 first-place prize and final table payouts.

Isaac Haxton was crowned the 2023 PokerGO Tour Player of the Year after amassing 2,847 PGT points which included four wins, 14 cashes, and more than $7.2 million in 2023 PGT season earnings.

The leaderboard is published on the PokerGO Tour website.

Note: Leaderboard is correct as of January 10, 2024.

2023 PokerGO Tour Leaderboard
Rank	Player	Points	Wins	Cashes	Earnings
1	(United States) Isaac Haxton	2,847	4	14	$7,243,295
2	(United States) Chris Brewer	2,490	2	24	$7,411,126
3	(United States) Stephen Chidwick	2,402	2	18	$3,935,653
4	(United States) Daniel Weinman	2,300	1	2	$12,180,000
5	(United States) Alex Foxen	2,103	1	23	$2,753,924
6	(China) Ren Lin	1,987	1	23	$2,934,340
7	(United States) Sam Soverel	1,954	2	25	$2,280,987
8	(United States) Nick Schulman	1,709	3	22	$2,530,419
9	(United States) Steven Jones	1,700	0	1	$6,500,000
10	(United States) Jeremy Ausmus	1,695	0	20	$2,437,553

== Schedule ==
The full schedule and results for the 2023 PokerGO Tour is published on the website.

(#/#): The first number is the number of PokerGO Tour titles won in 2023. The second number is the total number of PokerGO Tour titles won. Both numbers represent totals as of that point on the PokerGO Tour.

2023 PokerGO Tour Schedule
PGT #	Start date	Tournament	Buy-in	Type	Venue	Location	Winner	Prize	PGT Points	Entrants	Prize Pool
1	January 11	PokerGO Cup #1	$10,000	No-Limit Hold'em	ARIA Resort & Casino	Las Vegas	(United States) Sean Winter (1/6)	$216,000	216	90	$900,000
2	January 12	PokerGO Cup #2	$10,000	No-Limit Hold'em	ARIA Resort & Casino	Las Vegas	(United States) Aram Zobian (1/1)	$207,500	208	83	$830,000
3	January 13	PokerGO Cup #3	$10,000	No-Limit Hold'em	ARIA Resort & Casino	Las Vegas	(United States) Ed Sebesta (1/3)	$216,000	216	90	$900,000
4	January 14	PokerGO Cup #4	$10,000	No-Limit Hold'em	ARIA Resort & Casino	Las Vegas	(United States) Justin Saliba (1/1)	$195,000	195	78	$780,000
5	January 16	PokerGO Cup #5	$15,000	No-Limit Hold'em	ARIA Resort & Casino	Las Vegas	(United States) Anthony Hu (1/1)	$268,800	269	56	$840,000
6	January 17	PokerGO Cup #6	$25,000	No-Limit Hold'em	ARIA Resort & Casino	Las Vegas	(United States) Alex Foxen (1/7)	$317,040	240	50	$1,250,000
7	January 18	PokerGO Cup #7	$25,000	No-Limit Hold'em	ARIA Resort & Casino	Las Vegas	(Thailand) Punnat Punsri (1/4)	$310,000	186	31	$775,000
8	January 19	PokerGO Cup #8	$50,000	No-Limit Hold'em	ARIA Resort & Casino	Las Vegas	(United States) Issac Haxton (1/2)	$598,000	359	26	$1,300,000
9	February 4	PGT Mixed Games #1	$10,300	H.O.R.S.E.	ARIA Resort & Casino	Las Vegas	(United States) Shaun Deeb (1/2)	$208,800	209	87	$870,000
10	February 5	PGT Mixed Games #2	$10,300	8-Game	ARIA Resort & Casino	Las Vegas	(United States) John Monnette (1/2)	$211,200	211	88	$880,000
11	February 6	PGT Mixed Games #3	$10,300	Triple Stud Mix	ARIA Resort & Casino	Las Vegas	(United States) Eli Elezra (1/4)	$155,000	180	60	$600,000
12	February 7	PGT Mixed Games #4	$10,300	Big Bet Mix	ARIA Resort & Casino	Las Vegas	(United States) Ben Lamb (1/1)	$186,300	186	69	$690,000
13	February 8	PGT Mixed Games #5	$10,300	Triple Draw Mix	ARIA Resort & Casino	Las Vegas	(United States) Nick Guagenti (1/2)	$171,075	186	69	$690,000
14	February 9	PGT Mixed Games #6	$10,300	Dealer's Choice	ARIA Resort & Casino	Las Vegas	(United States) Scott Abrams (1/1)	$179,200	179	56	$560,000
15	February 10	PGT Mixed Games #7	$25,500	10-Game	ARIA Resort & Casino	Las Vegas	(United States) Jason Mercier (1/1)	$367,500	257	57	$1,425,000
16	February 11	PGT Mixed Games #8	$5,300	No-Limit 2-7 Single Draw	ARIA Resort & Casino	Las Vegas	(United States) Cary Katz (1/5)	$83,200	83	52	$260,000
17	March 6	Wynn Millions High Roller #1	$10,500	No-Limit Hold'em	Wynn Las Vegas	Las Vegas	(United States) Taylor Wilson (1/1)	$304,704	305	92	$920,000
18	March 7	Wynn Millions High Roller #2	$10,500	No-Limit Hold'em	Wynn Las Vegas	Las Vegas	(United States) Michael Wang (1/2)	$308,016	308	93	$930,000
19	March 8	Wynn Millions High Roller #3	$10,500	Pot-Limit Omaha	Wynn Las Vegas	Las Vegas	(United States) Eugene Lee (1/1)	$280,819	281	77	$770,000
20	March 11	PGT PLO Series #1	$5,000	Pot-Limit Omaha	ARIA Resort & Casino	Las Vegas	(United States) Daniyal Iqbal (1/1)	$160,000	160	200	$1,000,000
21	March 12	PGT PLO Series #2	$5,000	Pot-Limit Omaha	ARIA Resort & Casino	Las Vegas	(Canada) Allen Shen (1/1)	$91,290	91	179	$895,000
22	March 13	PGT PLO Series #3	$10,000	Pot-Limit Omaha	ARIA Resort & Casino	Las Vegas	(Argentina) Nacho Barbero (1/1)	$234,000	234	130	$1,300,000
23	March 14	PGT PLO Series #4	$10,000	Pot-Limit Omaha Hi-Lo	ARIA Resort & Casino	Las Vegas	(United States) Sean Troha (1/2)	$200,000	200	80	$800,000
24	March 15	PGT PLO Series #5	$10,000	Pot-Limit Omaha	ARIA Resort & Casino	Las Vegas	(Spain) Lautaro Guerra (1/1)	$220,400	235	112	$1,120,000
25	March 16	PGT PLO Series #6	$10,000	Mixed PLO	ARIA Resort & Casino	Las Vegas	(United States) Jim Collopy (1/1)	$206,400	206	86	$860,000
26	March 17	PGT PLO Series #7	$15,000	Pot-Limit Omaha	ARIA Resort & Casino	Las Vegas	(Spain) Lautaro Guerra (2/2)	$228,000	228	114	$1,710,000
27	March 18	PGT PLO Series #8	$25,000	Pot-Limit Omaha	ARIA Resort & Casino	Las Vegas	(Spain) Lautaro Guerra (3/3)	$518,750	311	83	$2,075,000
28	March 23	U.S. Poker Open #1	$10,000	No-Limit Hold'em	ARIA Resort & Casino	Las Vegas	(United States) Joey Weissman (1/2)	$231,000	231	105	$1,050,000
29	March 24	U.S. Poker Open #2	$10,000	No-Limit Hold'em	ARIA Resort & Casino	Las Vegas	(United States) Ren Lin (1/1)	$231,000	231	105	$1,050,000
30	March 25	U.S. Poker Open #3	$10,000	No-Limit Hold'em	ARIA Resort & Casino	Las Vegas	(United States) Sam Soverel (2/5)	$213,900	214	93	$930,000
31	March 27	U.S. Poker Open #4	$10,000	Pot-Limit Omaha	ARIA Resort & Casino	Las Vegas	(United States) Allan Le (1/1)	$200,200	200	77	$770,000
32	March 28	U.S. Poker Open #5	$10,000	No-Limit Hold'em	ARIA Resort & Casino	Las Vegas	(United States) Phil Hellmuth (1/1)	$211,200	211	88	$880,000
33	March 29	U.S. Poker Open #6	$15,000	Pot-Limit Omaha	ARIA Resort & Casino	Las Vegas	(United States) Isaac Kempton (1/2)	$279,000	279	62	$930,000
34	March 30	U.S. Poker Open #7	$15,000	No-Limit Hold'em	ARIA Resort & Casino	Las Vegas	(United States) Darren Elias (1/1)	$313,200	313	87	$1,305,000
35	March 31	U.S. Poker Open #8	$25,000	No-Limit Hold'em	ARIA Resort & Casino	Las Vegas	(United States) Isaac Haxton (2/3)	$432,000	259	54	$1,350,000
36	April 1	U.S. Poker Open #9	$25,000	No-Limit Hold'em	ARIA Resort & Casino	Las Vegas	(United States) Dan Smith (2/3)	$399,500	240	47	$1,175,000
37	April 3	U.S. Poker Open #10	$50,000	No-Limit Hold'em	ARIA Resort & Casino	Las Vegas	(United States) Martin Zamani (1/2)	$666,000	400	37	$1,850,000
38	May 30	WSOP #2	$25,000	No-Limit Hold'em	Horseshoe / Paris	Las Vegas	(Switzerland) Alexandre Vuilleumier (1/1)	$1,215,864	700	207	$4,864,500
39	June 2	WSOP #8	$25,000	No-Limit Hold'em	Horseshoe / Paris	Las Vegas	(Canada) Chanracy Khun (1/1)	$507,020	304	64	$1,504,000
40	June 3	WSOP #10	$10,000	Dealer's Choice	Horseshoe / Paris	Las Vegas	(United States) Chad Eveslage (1/4)	$311,428	311	130	$1,209,000
41	June 5	WSOP #14	$10,000	Seven Card Stud	Horseshoe / Paris	Las Vegas	(United States) Brian Yoon (1/2)	$311,433	311	130	$1,209,000
42	June 6	WSOP #16	$25,000	No-Limit Hold'em	Horseshoe / Paris	Las Vegas	(United States) Isaac Haxton (3/4)	$1,698,215	750	301	$7,073,500
43	June 8	WSOP #22	$10,000	Limit Hold'em	Horseshoe / Paris	Las Vegas	(United States) Josh Arieh (1/2)	$316,226	316	134	$1,246,200
44	June 9	WSOP #23	$50,000	No-Limit Hold'em	Horseshoe / Paris	Las Vegas	(Germany) Leon Sturm (1/1)	$1,546,024	750	124	$5,921,000
45	June 10	WSOP #24	$10,000	Omaha Hi-Lo	Horseshoe / Paris	Las Vegas	(United States) Ben Lamb (2/2)	$492,795	493	212	$1,971,600
46	June 12	WSOP #29	$100,000	No-Limit Hold'em	Horseshoe / Paris	Las Vegas	(Netherlands) Jans Arends (1/1)	$2,576,729	550	93	$8,997,750
47	June 13	WSOP #33	$10,000	Razz	Horseshoe / Paris	Las Vegas	(United States) Jerry Wong (1/1)	$298,682	299	123	$1,143,900
48	June 14	WSOP #35	$10,000	No-Limit Hold'em	Horseshoe / Paris	Las Vegas	(United States) Chris Klodnicki (1/1)	$733,317	733	568	$5,282,400
49	June 15	WSOP #38	$10,000	2-7 Triple Draw	Horseshoe / Paris	Las Vegas	(United Kingdom) Benny Glaser (1/2)	$311,428	311	130	$1,209,000
50	June 15	ARIA High Roller #1	$10,000	No-Limit Hold'em	ARIA Resort & Casino	Las Vegas	(United Kingdom) Stephen Chidwick (1/8)	$124,200	124	27	$270,000
51	June 16	WSOP #40	$250,000	No-Limit Hold'em	Horseshoe / Paris	Las Vegas	(United States) Chris Brewer (1/7)	$5,293,556	800	69	$17,181,000
52	June 16	ARIA High Roller #2	$10,000	No-Limit Hold'em	ARIA Resort & Casino	Las Vegas	(Hungary) Bernard Larabi (1/1)	$136,000	136	34	$340,000
53	June 17	ARIA High Roller #3	$10,000	No-Limit Hold'em	ARIA Resort & Casino	Las Vegas	(United States) Sam Soverel (3/6)	$163,200	163	48	$480,000
54	June 18	WSOP #44	$50,000	Poker Players Championship	Horseshoe / Paris	Las Vegas	(United States) Brian Rast (1/1)	$1,324,747	400	99	$4,727,220
55	June 20	ARIA High Roller #4	$10,000	Pot-Limit Omaha	ARIA Resort & Casino	Las Vegas	(United Kingdom) Ian Bradley (1/1)	$213,600	214	89	$890,000
56	June 21	WSOP #50	$10,000	Pot-Limit Omaha	Horseshoe / Paris	Las Vegas	(United States) Lou Garza (1/1)	$1,309,232	1200	731	$6,798300
57	June 22	ARIA High Roller #5	$10,000	Pot-Limit Omaha	ARIA Resort & Casino	Las Vegas	(Finland) Elias Harala (1/1)	$163,200	163	51	$510,000
58	June 23	WSOP #54	$10,000	H.O.R.S.E.	Horseshoe / Paris	Las Vegas	(United States) Mike Gorodinsky (1/1)	$422,747	423	185	$1,720,500
59	June 24	ARIA High Roller #6	$10,000	Pot-Limit Omaha	ARIA Resort & Casino	Las Vegas	(Netherlands) Ronald Keijzer (1/3)	$218,500	219	95	$950,000
60	June 25	WSOP #57	$25,000	Pot-Limit Omaha	Horseshoe / Paris	Las Vegas	(Hong Kong) Ka Kwan Lau (1/1)	$2,294,756	800	449	$10,551,500
61	June 27	WSOP #63	$10,000	Seven Card Stud Hi-Lo	Horseshoe / Paris	Las Vegas	(United States) Ryan Miller (1/1)	$344,677	345	141	$1,311,300
62	June 29	WSOP #69	$10,000	No-Limit 2-7 Single Draw	Horseshoe / Paris	Las Vegas	(United States) Chris Brewer (2/8)	$367,599	368	154	$1,432,200
63	June 30	WSOP #71	$50,000	Pot-Limit Omaha	Horseshoe / Paris	Las Vegas	(United States) Jesse Lonis (1/1)	$2,303,017	800	200	$9,550,000
64	July 1	WSOP #72	$10,000	No-Limit Hold'em	Horseshoe / Paris	Las Vegas	(United States) Phil Hellmuth (2/2)	$803,818	804	642	$5,970,600
65	July 2	WSOP #75	$10,000	Pot-Limit Omaha Hi-Lo	Horseshoe / Paris	Las Vegas	(Australia) Hassan Kamel (1/1)	$598,613	599	277	$2,576,100
66	July 2	ARIA High Roller #7	$10,000	No-Limit Hold'em	ARIA Resort & Casino	Las Vegas	(Denmark) Martin Stausholm (1/1)	$180,900	181	67	$670,000
67	July 3	WSOP #76	$10,000	No-Limit Hold'em	Horseshoe / Paris	Las Vegas	(United States) Daniel Weinman (1/1)	$12,100,000	2,300	10,043	$93,399,900
68	July 3	ARIA High Roller #8	$10,000	No-Limit Hold'em	ARIA Resort & Casino	Las Vegas	(Russia) Andrei Kotelnikov (1/1)	$156,400	156	46	$460,000
69	July 4	ARIA High Roller #9	$10,000	No-Limit Hold'em	ARIA Resort & Casino	Las Vegas	(Austria) Tobias Schwecht (1/1)	$172,612	173	75	$750,000
70	July 5	ARIA High Roller #10	$10,000	No-Limit Hold'em	ARIA Resort & Casino	Las Vegas	(Austria) Armin Rezaei (1/1)	$205,000	205	82	$820,000
71	July 6	ARIA High Roller #11	$10,000	No-Limit Hold'em	ARIA Resort & Casino	Las Vegas	(Argentina) Nacho Barbero (2/2)	$235,492	235	130	$1,300,000
72	July 10	WSOP #80	$25,000	H.O.R.S.E.	Horseshoe / Paris	Las Vegas	(United States) Josh Arieh (2/3)	$711,313	427	112	$2,632,000
73	July 12	WSOP #84	$50,000	No-Limit Hold'em	Horseshoe / Paris	Las Vegas	(Bulgaria) Alex Kulev (1/1)	$2,087,073	800	176	$8,404,000
74	July 14	WSOP #90	$10,000	No-Limit Hold'em	Horseshoe / Paris	Las Vegas	(France) Alexandre Reard (1/1)	$1,057,663	1,200	550	$5,115,000
75	July 16	WSOP #93	$10,000	Short Deck	Horseshoe / Paris	Las Vegas	(Faroe Islands) Martin Nielsen (1/1)	$270,760	271	106	$985,800
76	September 14	Poker Masters #1	$10,000	No-Limit Hold'em	ARIA Resort & Casino	Las Vegas	(Lithuania) Vladas Tamasauskas (1/1)	$239,400	239	114	$1,140,000
77	September 15	Poker Masters #2	$10,000	No-Limit Hold'em	ARIA Resort & Casino	Las Vegas	(United States) Darren Elias (2/2)	$223,100	223	97	$970,000
78	September 16	Poker Masters #3	$10,000	No-Limit Hold'em	ARIA Resort & Casino	Las Vegas	(Lithuania) Vladas Tamasauskas (2/2)	$208,800	209	87	$870,000
79	September 18	Poker Masters #4	$10,000	No-Limit Hold'em	ARIA Resort & Casino	Las Vegas	(United States) Chino Rheem (1/2)	$218,400	218	91	$910,000
80	September 19	Poker Masters #5	$10,000	No-Limit Hold'em	ARIA Resort & Casino	Las Vegas	(United States) Andrew Lichtenberger (1/6)	$204,000	204	85	$850,000
81	September 20	Poker Masters #6	$10,000	No-Limit Hold'em	ARIA Resort & Casino	Las Vegas	(Turkey) Orpen Kisacikoglu (1/4)	$218,500	219	95	$950,000
82	September 21	Poker Masters #7	$25,000	No-Limit Hold'em	ARIA Resort & Casino	Las Vegas	(United States) Nick Schulman (1/3)	$374,000	224	44	$1,100,000
83	September 22	Poker Masters #8	$25,000	No-Limit Hold'em	ARIA Resort & Casino	Las Vegas	(United Kingdom) Stephen Chidwick (2/9)	$400,000	240	50	$1,250,000
84	September 23	Poker Masters #9	$25,000	No-Limit Hold'em	ARIA Resort & Casino	Las Vegas	(United States) Justin Bonomo (1/8)	$333,000	200	37	$925,000
85	September 25	Poker Masters #10	$50,000	No-Limit Hold'em	ARIA Resort & Casino	Las Vegas	(United States) Jonathan Jaffe (1/2)	$756,000	454	42	$2,100,000
86	September 26	ARIA High Roller #12	$25,000	No-Limit Hold'em	ARIA Resort & Casino	Las Vegas	(Spain) Adrian Mateos (1/4)	$216,000	130	16	$400,000
87	September 27	ARIA High Roller #13	$25,000	No-Limit Hold'em	ARIA Resort & Casino	Las Vegas	(Turkey) Orpen Kisacikoglu (2/5)	$216,000	130	16	$400,000
88	September 28	Super High Roller Bowl VIII	$300,000	No-Limit Hold'em	ARIA Resort & Casino	Las Vegas	(United States) Isaac Haxton (4/5)	$2,760,000	550	20	$6,000,000
89	October 5	PGT Mixed Games II #1	$10,000	H.O.R.S.E.	ARIA Resort & Casino	Las Vegas	(United States) David Funkhouser (1/1)	$187,200	187	72	$720,000
90	October 6	PGT Mixed Games II #2	$10,000	Big Bet Mix	ARIA Resort & Casino	Las Vegas	(United States) Chino Rheem (2/3)	$171,000	171	57	$570,000
91	October 7	PGT Mixed Games II #3	$5,000	10-game	ARIA Resort & Casino	Las Vegas	(United States) David Prociak (1/1)	$93,600	94	72	$360,000
92	October 9	PGT Mixed Games II #4	$10,000	8-Game	ARIA Resort & Casino	Las Vegas	(Poland) Dzmitry Urbanovich (1/1)	$179,200	179	56	$560,000
93	October 10	PGT Mixed Games II #5	$10,000	Triple Stud Mix	ARIA Resort & Casino	Las Vegas	(United States) Nick Schulman (2/4)	$144,000	144	40	$400,000
94	October 11	PGT Mixed Games II #6	$10,000	Dealer's Choice	ARIA Resort & Casino	Las Vegas	(United States) Dylan Weisman (1/2)	$156,400	167	49	$490,000
95	October 12	PGT Mixed Games II #7	$10,000	Triple Draw Mix	ARIA Resort & Casino	Las Vegas	(United States) Hal Rotholz (1/1)	$163,200	163	51	$510,000
96	October 13	PGT Mixed Games II #8	$25,000	10-Game	ARIA Resort & Casino	Las Vegas	(United States) Maxx Coleman (1/2)	$245,630	174	29	$725,000
97	October 14	PGT Mixed Games II #9	$5,000	No-Limit 2-7 Single Draw	ARIA Resort & Casino	Las Vegas	(United States) Arthur Morris (1/1)	$55,200	55	24	$120,000
98	October 16	Super High Roller Bowl: Pot-Limit Omaha	$100,000	Pot-Limit Omaha	ARIA Resort & Casino	Las Vegas	(United States) Jared Bleznick (1/2)	$1,292,000	400	38	$3,800,000
99	October 19	PGT PLO Series II #1	$5,000	Pot-Limit Omaha	ARIA Resort & Casino	Las Vegas	(United States) Matthew Wantman (1/1)	$150,500	151	172	$860,000
100	October 20	PGT PLO Series II #2	$5,000	Pot-Limit Omaha	ARIA Resort & Casino	Las Vegas	(Finland) Eelis Parssinen (1/1)	$149,000	149	149	$1,117,500
101	October 21	PGT PLO Series II #3	$10,000	Pot-Limit Omaha	ARIA Resort & Casino	Las Vegas	(United States) Stephen Hubbard (1/1)	$231,750	232	103	$1,030,000
102	October 22	PGT PLO Series II #4	$10,000	Pot-Limit Omaha	ARIA Resort & Casino	Las Vegas	(United States) Adam Hendrix (1/4)	$172,710	200	101	$1,515,000
103	October 23	PGT PLO Series II #5	$10,000	Pot-Limit Omaha	ARIA Resort & Casino	Las Vegas	(United States) Bryce Yockey (1/1)	$239,400	239	114	$1,140,000
104	October 24	PGT PLO Series II #6	$10,000	Mixed PLO	ARIA Resort & Casino	Las Vegas	(Brazil) Joao Simao (1/1)	$182,000	182	65	$650,000
105	October 25	ARIA High Roller #14	$10,000	Pot-Limit Omaha	ARIA Resort & Casino	Las Vegas	(United States) Isaac Kempton (2/3)	$184,600	185	71	$710,000
106	October 26	ARIA High Roller #15	$10,000	Pot-Limit Omaha	ARIA Resort & Casino	Las Vegas	(United States) Jesse Lonis (1/1)	$187,600	188	67	$670,000
107	October 27	PGT PLO Series II #7	$10,000	Pot-Limit Omaha	ARIA Resort & Casino	Las Vegas	(Hungary) Benjamin Juhasz (1/1)	$206,400	206	86	$860,000
108	October 28	PGT PLO Series II #8	$10,000	Pot-Limit Omaha Hi-Lo	ARIA Resort & Casino	Las Vegas	(United States) Zhen Cai (1/1)	$176,000	176	55	$550,000
109	October 29	PGT PLO Series II #9	$25,000	Pot-Limit Omaha	ARIA Resort & Casino	Las Vegas	(United States) Daniel Geeng (1/1)	$487,500	293	75	$1,875,000
110	November 1	PGT Sprint #1	$5,000	No-Limit Hold'em	ARIA Resort & Casino	Las Vegas	(United States) John Riordan (1/2)	$94,500	95	63	$315,000
111	November 2	PGT Sprint #2	$5,000	No-Limit Hold'em	ARIA Resort & Casino	Las Vegas	(United States) Isaac Kempton (3/4)	$83,200	83	52	$260,000
112	November 3	PGT Sprint #3	$5,000	No-Limit Hold'em	ARIA Resort & Casino	Las Vegas	(United States) Ping Liu (1/1)	$89,600	90	64	$320,000
113	November 4	PGT Sprint #4	$10,000	No-Limit Hold'em	ARIA Resort & Casino	Las Vegas	(United States) John Hennigan (1/1)	$97,894	98	35	$350,000
114	November 6	WSOP Europe #8	€25,000	No-Limit Hold'em	King's Casino	Czech Republic	(Canada) Daniel Dvoress (1/2)	€600,000	360	89	€2,079,930
115	November 9	WSOP Europe #12	€50,000	No-Limit Hold'em	King's Casino	Czech Republic	(India) Santhosh Suvarna (1/1)	€650,000	390	37	€1,739,925
116	November 10	WSOP Europe #13	€10,350	No-Limit Hold'em	King's Casino	Czech Republic	(Austria) Max Neugebauer (1/1)	€1,500,000	1,250	817	€7,761,500
117	November 27	ARIA High Roller #16	$10,000	No-Limit Hold'em	ARIA Resort & Casino	Las Vegas	(United States) Dan Smith (3/4)	$119,600	120	26	$260,000
118	November 28	ARIA High Roller #17	$10,000	No-Limit Hold'em	ARIA Resort & Casino	Las Vegas	(United States) Isaac Kempton (4/5)	$115,000	115	25	$250,000
119	November 29	ARIA High Roller #18	$10,000	No-Limit Hold'em	ARIA Resort & Casino	Las Vegas	(United States) Seth Davies (1/2)	$128,800	129	28	$280,000
120	November 30	ARIA High Roller #19	$10,000	No-Limit Hold'em	ARIA Resort & Casino	Las Vegas	(Lithuania) Vladas Tamasauskas (3/3)	$116,000	116	29	$290,000
121	December 5	WSOP Paradise #3	$25,000	No-Limit Hold'em	Atlantis Paradise Island	Bahamas	(Austria) Samuel Mullur (1/1)	$2,726,300	850	533	$13,058,500
122	December 7	WSOP Paradise #5	$10,000	Pot-Limit Omaha	Atlantis Paradise Island	Bahamas	(Greece) Nikolaos Lampropoulos (1/1)	$871,600	523	140	$3,430,000
123	December 8	WSOP Paradise #7	$50,000	No-Limit Hold'em	Atlantis Paradise Island	Bahamas	(United States) Erik Seidel (1/2)	$1,704,400	750	137	$6,713,000
124	December 9	WSOP Paradise #9	$100,000	No-Limit Hold'em	Atlantis Paradise Island	Bahamas	(Japan) Masashi Oya (1/1)	$2,940,000	550	111	$10,878,000
125	December 13	WSOP Paradise #13	$10,000	Pot-Limit Omaha	Atlantis Paradise Island	Bahamas	(Brazil) Dante Goya (1/1)	$277,700	278	104	$1,008,800
126	December 14	WSOP Paradise #15	$10,000	No-Limit Hold'em	Atlantis Paradise Island	Bahamas	(China) Dong Chen (1/1)	$411,659	412	169	$1,639,300
127	January 2, 2024	PGT Last Chance #1	$10,000	No-Limit Hold'em	ARIA Resort & Casino	Las Vegas	(Canada) Daniel Negreanu (1/6)	$218,400	218	91	$910,000
128	January 3, 2024	PGT Last Chance #2	$10,000	No-Limit Hold'em	ARIA Resort & Casino	Las Vegas	(Russia) Artur Martirosyan (1/2)	$211,200	211	88	$880,000
129	January 4, 2024	PGT Last Chance #3	$10,000	No-Limit Hold'em	ARIA Resort & Casino	Las Vegas	(United States) Samuel Laskowitz (1/1)	$205,000	205	82	$820,000
130	January 5, 2024	PGT Last Chance #4	$10,000	No-Limit Hold'em	ARIA Resort & Casino	Las Vegas	(United States) Dylan DeStefano (1/1)	$195,000	195	78	$780,000
131	January 6, 2024	PGT Last Chance #5	$10,000	No-Limit Hold'em	ARIA Resort & Casino	Las Vegas	(Russia) Artur Martirosyan (2/3)	$197,500	198	79	$790,000
132	January 7, 2024	PGT Last Chance #6	$10,000	No-Limit Hold'em	ARIA Resort & Casino	Las Vegas	(United States) Nick Schulman (3/5)	$161,500	162	79	$790,000
133	January 9, 2024	PGT Championship	--	No-Limit Hold'em	ARIA Resort & Casino	Las Vegas	(Germany) Daniel Smiljkovic (1/1)	$500,000	--	54	$1,000,000
