= 2023 PokerGO Cup =

Series of poker tournaments

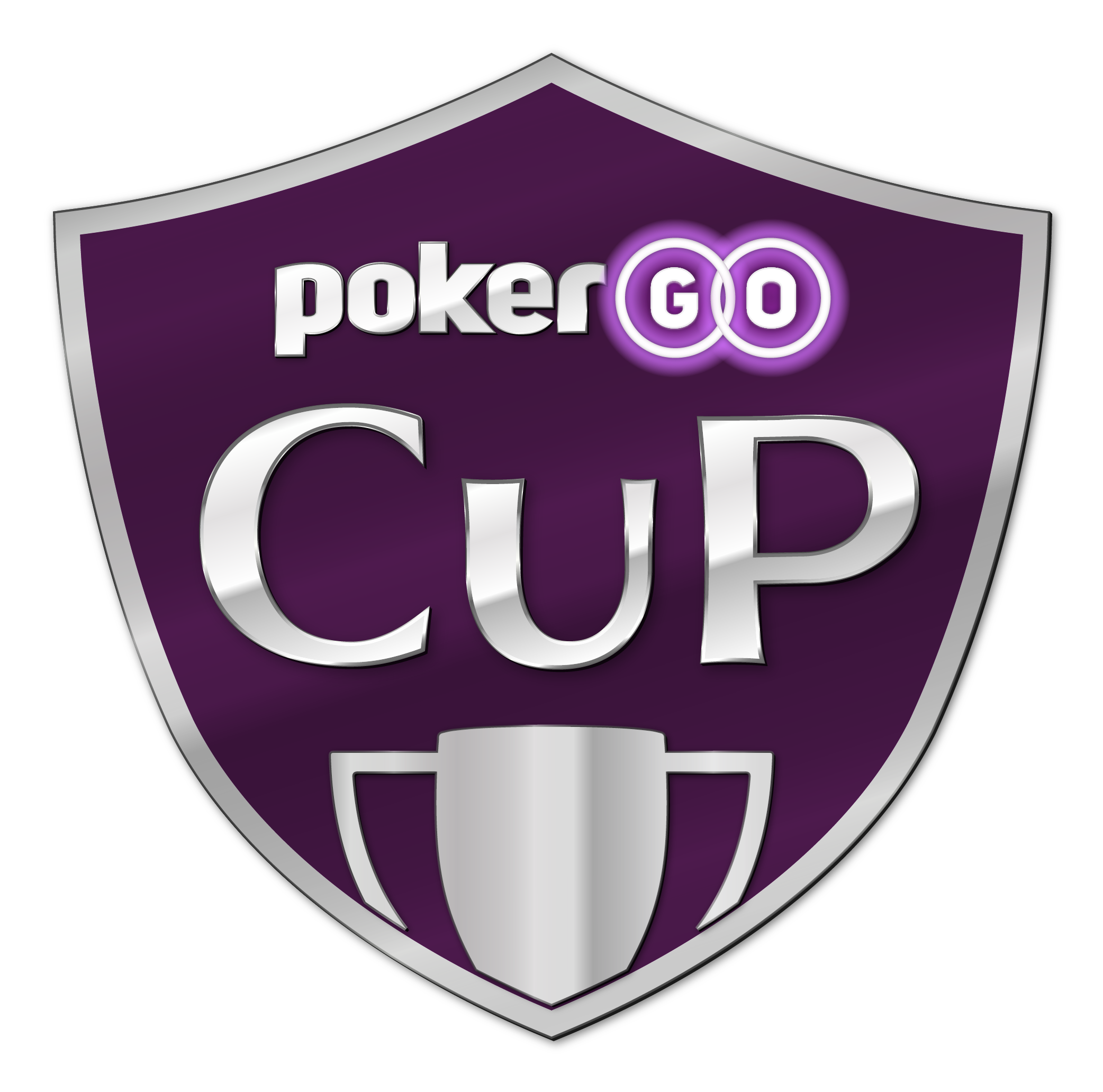
- Venue: PokerGO Studio at Aria Resort and Casino
- Location: Las Vegas, Nevada
- Dates: January 11-20, 2023

Champion
- (United States) Cary Katz (PokerGO Cup winner); (United States) Isaac Haxton (Main Event winner)

The 2023 PokerGO Cup was the third iteration of the PokerGO Cup, a series of high-stakes poker tournaments as part of the PokerGO Tour. It was held from inside the PokerGO Studio at Aria Resort & Casino in Las Vegas, Nevada. The series took place from January 11-20, 2023, with eight scheduled events culminating in a $50,000 No-Limit Hold'em tournament.

The player who earns the most points throughout the series would be crowned the PokerGO Cup champion earning the PokerGO Cup and winning the $50,000 championship bonus.

Every final table was streamed on OTT service PokerGO.

The Main Event was won by American Isaac Haxton, and the PokerGO Cup was awarded to American Cary Katz.

== Schedule ==
#	Event	Entrants	Winner	Prize	Winning hand	Runner-up	Losing hand	Results
1	$10,000 No-Limit Hold'em	90	(United States) Sean Winter	$216,000	K♦ 3♣	(United States) Alex Foxen	10♥ 8♦	Results
2	$10,000 No-Limit Hold'em	83	(United States) Aram Zobian	$207,500	8♣ 6♦	(Thailand) Punnat Punsri	A♠ 7♥	Results
3	$10,000 No-Limit Hold'em	90	(United States) Ed Sebesta	$216,000	K♦ 9♣	(United States) Nick Schulman	A♠ 7♣	Results
4	$10,000 No-Limit Hold'em	78	(United States) Justin Saliba	$195,000	A♣ 4♦	(United States) Anthony Hu	A♠ 7♥	Results
5	$15,000 No-Limit Hold'em	56	(United States) Anthony Hu	$268,800	7♥ 7♠	(United States) Erik Seidel	10♠ 10♣	Results
6	$25,000 No-Limit Hold'em	50	(United States) Alex Foxen	$317,040	Q♦ J♦	(Turkey) Orpen Kisacikoglu	J♣ 6♠	Results
7	$25,000 No-Limit Hold'em	31	(Thailand) Punnat Punsri	$310,000	J♦ 9♣	(United States) Daniel Colpoys	10♥ 8♣	Results
8	$50,000 No-Limit Hold'em	26	(United States) Isaac Haxton	$598,000	J♦ 4♦	(United States) Cary Katz	K♠ 7♣	Results

== Series leaderboard ==
The 2023 PokerGO Cup will award the PokerGO Cup to the player that accumulates the most PokerGO Tour points during the series, as well as the $50,000 championship bonus. American Cary Katz cashed five times on his way to accumulating $655,800 in winnings. Katz accumulated 460 points and was awarded the PokerGO Cup.

Standings
Rank	Name	Points	Earnings
1	(United States) Cary Katz	460	$655,800
2	(United States) Anthony Hu	454	$454,200
3	(United States) Alex Foxen	393	$470,040
4	(United States) Isaac Haxton	359	$598,000
5	(United States) Sean Winter	341	$424,000
6	(Thailand) Punnat Punsri	335	$459,400
7	(United States) Aram Zobian	292	$291,500
8	(United States) Ed Sebesta	258	$258,000
9	(Turkey) Orpen Kisacikoglu	212	$399,460
10	(United States) Erik Seidel	223	$223,200

== Results ==
=== Event #1: $10,000 No-Limit Hold'em ===
- 2-Day Event: January 11-12, 2023
- Number of Entries: 90
- Total Prize Pool: $900,000
- Number of Payouts: 13
- Winning Hand: K♦ 3♣

Final Table
Place	Name	Prize
1st	(United States) Sean Winter	$216,000
2nd	(United States) Alex Foxen	$153,000
3rd	(United States) Joseph Cheong	$108,000
4th	(United States) David Peters	$90,000
5th	(Spain) Adrian Mateos	$72,000
6th	(Turkey) Orpen Kisacikoglu	$54,000

=== Event #2: $10,000 No-Limit Hold'em ===
- 2-Day Event: January 12-13, 2023
- Number of Entries: 83
- Total Prize Pool: $830,000
- Number of Payouts: 12
- Winning Hand: 8♣ 6♦

Final Table
Place	Name	Prize
1st	(United States) Aram Zobian	$207,500
2nd	(Thailand) Punnat Punsri	$149,400
3rd	(Canada) Kristen Foxen	$99,600
4th	(United States) Seth Davies	$83,000
5th	(United States) Andrew Moreno	$66,400
6th	(United States) Cary Katz	$49,800

=== Event #3: $10,000 No-Limit Hold'em ===
- 2-Day Event: January 13-14, 2023
- Number of Entries: 90
- Total Prize Pool: $900,000
- Number of Payouts: 13
- Winning Hand: K♦ 9♣

Final Table
Place	Name	Prize
1st	(United States) Ed Sebesta	$216,000
2nd	(United States) Nick Schulman	$153,000
3rd	(United States) Philip Shing	$108,000
4th	(United States) Cary Katz	$90,000
5th	(Spain) Adrian Mateos	$72,000
6th	(Canada) Kristen Foxen	$54,000

=== Event #4: $10,000 No-Limit Hold'em ===
- 2-Day Event: January 14 and 16, 2023
- Number of Entries: 78
- Total Prize Pool: $780,000
- Number of Payouts: 12
- Winning Hand: A♣ 4♦

Final Table
Place	Name	Prize
1st	(United States) Justin Saliba	$195,000
2nd	(United States) Anthony Hu	$140,400
3rd	(Spain) Adrian Mateos	$93,600
4th	(United States) Calvin Lee	$78,000
5th	(United States) Andrew Moreno	$62,400
6th	(United States) Erik Seidel	$46,800

=== Event #5: $15,000 No-Limit Hold'em ===
- 2-Day Event: January 16-17, 2023
- Number of Entries: 56
- Total Prize Pool: $840,000
- Number of Payouts: 8
- Winning Hand: 7♥ 7♠

Final Table
Place	Name	Prize
1st	(United States) Anthony Hu	$268,800
2nd	(United States) Erik Seidel	$176,400
3rd	(United States) Dylan DeStefano	$117,600
4th	(United States) Aram Zobian	$84,000
5th	(United States) Brian Kim	$67,200
6th	(United States) Jeremy Ausmus	$50,400

=== Event #6: $25,000 No-Limit Hold'em ===
- 2-Day Event: January 17-18, 2023
- Number of Entries: 50
- Total Prize Pool: $1,250,000
- Number of Payouts: 8
- Winning Hand:Q♦ J♦

Final Table
Place	Name	Prize
1st	(United States) Alex Foxen	$317,040
2nd	(Turkey) Orpen Kisacikoglu	$345,460
3rd	(United States) Aram Oganyan	$175,000
4th	(United States) Cary Katz	$125,000
5th	(United States) Sean Perry	$100,000
6th	(United States) Sam Soverel	$75,000

=== Event #7: $25,000 No-Limit Hold'em ===
- 2-Day Event: January 18-19, 2023
- Number of Entries: 31
- Total Prize Pool: $775,000
- Number of Payouts: 5
- Winning Hand: J♦ 9♣

Final Table
Place	Name	Prize
1st	(Thailand) Punnat Punsri	$310,000
2nd	(United States) Daniel Colpoys	$201,500
3rd	(Canada) Daniel Negreanu	$124,000
4th	(United States) David Peters	$85,250
5th	(United States) Sam Soverel	$54,250

=== Event #8: $50,000 No-Limit Hold'em ===
- 2-Day Event: January 19-20, 2023
- Number of Entries: 26
- Total Prize Pool: $1,300,000
- Number of Payouts: 4
- Winning Hand:J♦ 4♦

Final Table
Place	Name	Prize
1st	(United States) Isaac Haxton	$598,000
2nd	(United States) Cary Katz	$364,000
3rd	(United States) Sean Winter	$208,000
4th	(United States) Daniel Colpoys	$130,000

== See also ==
- PokerGO Tour
- 2023 PokerGO Tour
- PokerGO
- Poker tournament
