= Jeremy Ausmus =

American poker player (born 1979)

- Nickname: Chipchecka
- Born: September 22, 1979 (age 47)

World Series of Poker
- Bracelets: 6
- Final tables: 19
- Money finishes: 110
- Highest WSOP Main Event finish: 5th, 2012

World Poker Tour
- Title: None
- Final table: 1
- Money finishes: 13

European Poker Tour
- Title: None
- Final table: None
- Money finish: 1

Jeremy Wayne Ausmus (born September 22, 1979) is an American professional poker player. As of December 2025, his total live tournament earnings exceed $28 million.

== Career ==
=== World Series of Poker (WSOP) ===
Ausmus made his first appearance at the WSOP in 2012, achieving a breakthrough by finishing fifth in the WSOP Main Event and earning $2,155,313. He entered the final table as the shortest stack, holding 9,805,000 in chips.

Ausmus began 2013 with a victory in the DeepStack Extravaganza II Main Event at the Venetian, earning $121,853. He carried this momentum into the WSOP and later secured his first WSOP bracelet at the World Series of Poker Europe, winning Event #3: €1,500 + 150 Pot-Limit Omaha for $95,054.

In 2014, Ausmus started the year with another victory at the DeepStack Extravaganza I Main Event, earning $148,694, mirroring his success from the previous year.

In October 2021, Ausmus nearly missed registering for the $1,000 Covid-19 No-Limit Hold'em Charity event but made it in just before late registration closed. His decision paid off as he won WSOP Event #3, securing a $48,681 prize after defeating a field of 266 players. The tournament featured a turbo structure with 20-minute levels, and Ausmus claimed victory in less than two hours on Day 2. He expressed enjoyment for turbo events, noting they are lower pressure and more about fun and gambling than deep-stack skill.

In November 2021, Ausmus won his third WSOP bracelet and $1,188,918 by taking down the $50,000 Pot-Limit Omaha High Roller on November 21. He triumphed after an intense three-handed battle against poker legends Phil Hellmuth and Daniel Negreanu. Ausmus nearly busted in third but survived, ultimately defeating Hellmuth in a quick two-hand heads-up match where his straight prevailed over Hellmuth’s two pair. Hellmuth was denied his 17th bracelet, and Negreanu fell in third place. The event featured 85 entrants and a $4,069,375 prize pool, drawing some of the biggest names in poker.

In July 2022, Ausmus won the 2022 WSOP Event #23: $3,000 Limit Hold'em 6-Handed, defeating a field of 213 players to claim his fourth WSOP bracelet and a prize of $142,147. Ausmus outlasted notable players, including Michael Rocco, Gabe Ramos, and runner-up Zachary Grech, during the three-day tournament held at Bally's and Paris Las Vegas. Later that summer, Jeremy Ausmus won his first WSOP Circuit ring and his fifth WSOP bracelet, both in online events. He earned $53,864 for his circuit ring victory and $51,807 for his bracelet win.

In 2023, Jeremy Ausmus secured an outright victory in WSOP Online Event #8: $3,200 No-Limit Hold'em High Roller, earning $360,036.

=== PokerGO Tour (PGT) ===
In October 2024, Ausmus ended a 684-day trophy drought at PokerGO Studio by winning Event #7: $15,100 Pot-Limit Omaha at the 2024 PGT PLO Series II, earning $288,000. This victory marked his 25th cash of the 2024 PGT season, bringing his yearly point total to 2,789 and his earnings to over $5.8 million.

Ausmus controlled the final table, securing key double knockouts, including eliminating Artem Maksimov and Alex Foxen with pocket aces. In a closely contested heads-up match, he built multiple leads against Gruffudd Pugh-Jones, only to see them erased before finally securing the win with a flopped wheel. The victory extended his lead in the PGT standings, further distancing himself from second-place Daniel Negreanu.

Ausmus concluded the 2024 PGT season by winning the PGT $1,000,000 Championship on January 11, 2025, at the PokerGO Studio in Las Vegas, earning $500,000 in the season-ending freeroll event. Having already secured the 2024 PGT Player of the Year title with 2,966 points and nearly $6 million in earnings from 26 cashes, Ausmus entered the 50-player tournament—comprising the top 40 PGT leaderboard players and 10 Dream Seat winners—with the largest starting stack.

At the final table, Ausmus dropped to a short stack but recovered after doubling up against Dylan Weisman. He ultimately defeated Nick Schulman heads-up, with his two pair holding against a busted straight draw in the final hand. This victory brought his career live tournament earnings to over $23.8 million and added to his six WSOP bracelets.

Ausmus won the 2024 PGT Player of the Year title, securing the top spot with 2,966 points. His performance at the WSOP, where he cashed for over $3 million, contributed to his lead over his closest competitor, Daniel Negreanu. Ausmus also found success in other high-stakes events, including a third-place finish in the Super High Roller Bowl for $1.2 million and a victory in a PGT PLO Series II event. He concluded the season with 26 cashes, totaling nearly $6 million in earnings. As the 2024 PGT Player of the Year, he received a $50,000 bonus. His achievements have led to discussions about his potential candidacy for the Poker Hall of Fame. Ausmus would also win the season-ending PGT $1,000,000 Championship for $500,000 after defeating Nick Schulman heads-up.

=== Triton Poker Series ===
In February 2024, Ausmus won his first Triton Poker title at the 2025 Triton Super High Roller Series in Jeju, South Korea, emerging victorious in Event #3: $25,000 No-Limit Hold'em. He topped a record-breaking field of 391 entries to claim the $1.892 million first-place prize.

Ausmus experienced a pivotal moment in the tournament when a misclick with pocket kings against an opponent's aces inadvertently saved him from elimination, as the board produced two additional aces. Ausmus, who rarely competes in Triton events, leveraged both skill and fortunate breaks to navigate a challenging final table. He ultimately defeated Chinese player Zhou Quan heads-up after a short-stacked battle. The victory, witnessed by friend Jason Koon, marked Ausmus’ largest tournament score since late 2021 and reinforced his strong performance in 2025, following his PGT Championship win in 2024.

=== Other Notable Tournaments ===
In 2023, Ausmus achieved his first major result of the year at the PokerStars Caribbean Adventure, winning Event #17: $2,200 No-Limit Hold'em - Deep Stack and earning $144,610.

In 2024, Jeremy Ausmus won a side event at the World Poker Tour (WPT), claiming victory in Event #55: $25,500 Pot-Limit Omaha - High Roller and earning $206,400.

=== Public and Community Reaction ===
Ausmus has at times been the subject of discussion within the poker community for his public comments on competitive integrity in online poker events. In 2022, he questioned aspects of the outcome of a WSOP.com tournament, prompting mixed responses from players and commentators. An official investigation by tournament organizers later determined that no cheating had occurred.

During the COVID-19 pandemic, Ausmus also drew attention after it became public that he had received a Paycheck Protection Program (PPP) loan, a government relief initiative aimed at helping small businesses remain operational and retain employees during pandemic-related shutdowns. The disclosure led to criticism on social media, with some commentators questioning whether high-earning professional poker players should have accessed the program.

== Career bracelets ==
An "E" following a year denotes bracelet(s) won at the World Series of Poker EuropeAn "O" following a year denotes bracelet(s) won during the World Series of Poker Online
Year	Tournament	Prize (US$)
2013 E	€1,650 Pot Limit Omaha	$95,054
2021	$1,000 No Limit Hold'em - COVID-19 Relief Charity Event	$48,687
2021	$50,000 Pot Limit Omaha - High Roller	$1,188,918
2022	$3,000 Limit Hold'em - Six-Handed	$142,147
2022 O	$365 No Limit Hold'em	$51,807
2023	$3,200 No-Limit Hold'em High Roller (Online)	$360,036

== PokerGO Tour Titles ==
Year	Tournament	Prize
2021	WSOP #84 - $50,000 Pot-Limit Omaha High Roller	$1,188,918
2022	PokerGO Cup #4 - $15,000 NLH	$236,250
2022	U.S. Poker Open #5 - $10,000 NLH	$178,200
2022	Poker Masters #1 - $10,000 NLH	$204,000
2022	ARIA High Roller #30: $10,000 NLH	$111,520
2024	PGT PLO Series II #7 - $15,100 Pot-Limit Omaha	$288,000
2025	PGT $1,000,000 Championship Freeroll	$500,000
2025	PGT Venetian Classic High Roller #2 - $5,100 No-Limit Hold'em	$99,200
2026	PGT PLO Series at Venetian #3 - $5,100 Pot-Limit Omaha Quattro Bounty	$51,450

== Triton Titles ==
Festival	Tournament	Prize $
Jeju 2025	$25k NLH 8-Handed	$1,892,000
