= 2022 PokerGO Tour =

Series of American poker tournaments 2022

2022 PokerGO Tour season
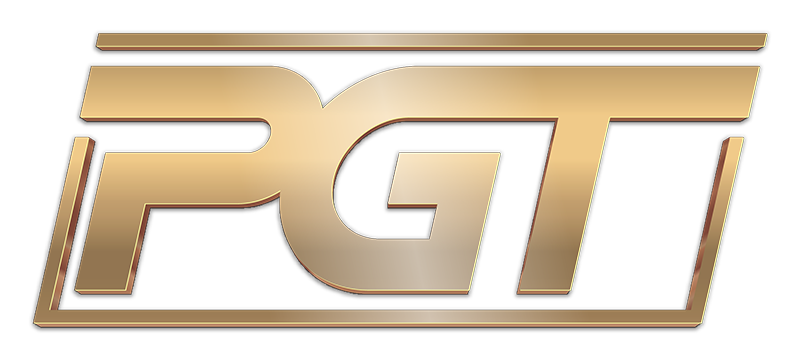
- Duration: January 5, 2022 - December 22, 2022
- Number of official events: 175
- Most wins: (United Kingdom) Stephen Chidwick (6)
- 2022 PokerGO Tour Player of the Year: (United Kingdom) Stephen Chidwick; 3,412 PGT Points
- 2022 PokerGO Tour Money Leader: (Norway) Espen Jørstad ($10,217,955)
- 2022 PGT Championship Winner: (United States) Jason Koon ($500,000)

The 2022 PokerGO Tour was the second season of the PokerGO Tour. The season runs for 2022 with the first event beginning on January 5.

Unlike the 2021 season where the top three finishers were awarded prize money, the 2022 season of the PokerGO Tour would culminate with a winner-take-all PGT Championship. Following the conclusion of the all qualifying PokerGO Tour tournaments, the top 21 players will compete in the PGT Championship where starting chips will be based on PokerGO Tour points and the winner will win the $500,000 first-place prize.

The PGT Championship began on December 21, 2022, with 15 of the 21 eligible players participating. Jason Koon defeated Sean Winter heads-up to win the $500,000 first-place prize to be crowned the PGT Championship winner.

== Leaderboard ==
The top 21 players following the conclusion of all qualifying PokerGO Tour tournaments will be invited to play in the season-ending PGT Championship. Players will have their starting chips based on how many points they earned during the season, and the PGT Championship will be a winner-take-all with a $500,000 first-place prize set for the winner.

Stephen Chidwick was crowned 2022 PokerGO Tour Player of the Year after amassing 3,412 PGT points which included six wins, 32 cashes, and more than $6.3 million in 2022 PGT season earnings.

The leaderboard is published on the PokerGO Tour website.

Note: Leaderboard is correct as of December 25, 2022.

2022 PokerGO Tour Leaderboard
Rank	Player	Points	Wins	Cashes	Earnings
1	(United Kingdom) Stephen Chidwick	3,412	6	32	$6,314,084
2	(United States) Phil Ivey	3,083	3	17	$5,944,394
3	(United States) Jason Koon	2,833	2	17	$6,231,848
4	(Argentina) Michael Duek	2,400	1	6	$5,063,505
5	(United States) Sean Winter	2,368	3	20	$3,599,071
6	(United States) Alex Foxen	2,356	4	19	$6,578,029
7	(Norway) Espen Jørstad	2,239	1	5	$10,217,955
8	(United States) Chad Eveslage	2,162	2	8	$2,777,680
9	(Hong Kong) Danny Tang	2,139	1	12	$3,830,315
10	(Belarus) Mikita Badziakouski	2,089	2	11	$4,292,769

== Schedule ==
The full schedule and results for the 2022 PokerGO Tour is published on the website.

(#/#): The first number is the number of PokerGO Tour titles won in 2022. The second number is the total number of PokerGO Tour titles won. Both numbers represent totals as of that point on the PokerGO Tour.

2022 PokerGO Tour Schedule
PGT #	Start date	Tournament	Buy-in	Type	Venue	Location	Winner	Prize	PGT Points	Entrants	Prize Pool
1	January 5	Venetian High Roller #1	$10,000	No-Limit Hold'em	The Venetian Las Vegas	Las Vegas	(Thailand) Punnat Punsri (1/1)	$118,037	118	34	$340,000
2	January 6	Venetian High Roller #2	$10,000	No-Limit Hold'em	The Venetian Las Vegas	Las Vegas	(Thailand) Punnat Punsri (2/2)	$133,200	133	37	$370,000
3	January 7	Venetian High Roller #3	$15,000	No-Limit Hold'em	The Venetian Las Vegas	Las Vegas	(United States) Alex Foxen (1/3)	$153,615	154	26	$390,000
4	January 8	Venetian High Roller #4	$25,000	No-Limit Hold'em	The Venetian Las Vegas	Las Vegas	(Bosnia and Herzegovina) Ali Imsirovic (1/15)	$270,000	162	20	$500,000
5	January 16	Stairway To Millions #5	$15,000	No-Limit Hold'em	ARIA Resort & Casino	Las Vegas	(United States) Michael Wang (1/1)	$219,300	219	43	$645,000
6	January 17	Stairway To Millions #6	$25,000	No-Limit Hold'em	ARIA Resort & Casino	Las Vegas	(United States) Jake Schindler (1/5)	$287,500	173	25	$625,000
7	January 18	Stairway To Millions #7	$50,000	No-Limit Hold'em	ARIA Resort & Casino	Las Vegas	(United States) Nick Petrangelo (1/4)	$567,000	340	21	$1,050,000
8	January 19	Stairway To Millions #8	$100,000	No-Limit Hold'em	ARIA Resort & Casino	Las Vegas	(United States) Nick Petrangelo (2/5)	$1,026,000	400	19	$1,900,000
9	January 24	Seminole High Roller	$25,500	No-Limit Hold'em	Seminole Hard Rock Hotel & Casino	Hollywood	(United States) Jonathan Jaffe (1/1)	$574,085	344	93	$2,297,100
10	February 2	PokerGO Cup #1	$10,000	No-Limit Hold'em	ARIA Resort & Casino	Las Vegas	(United States) Daniel Colpoys (1/1)	$200,200	200	77	$770,000
11	February 3	PokerGO Cup #2	$10,000	No-Limit Hold'em	ARIA Resort & Casino	Las Vegas	(United States) Sean Perry (1/7)	$200,000	200	80	$800,000
12	February 4	PokerGO Cup #3	$10,000	No-Limit Hold'em	ARIA Resort & Casino	Las Vegas	(United States) Jake Daniels (1/2)	$200,000	200	80	$800,000
13	February 5	PokerGO Cup #4	$15,000	No-Limit Hold'em	ARIA Resort & Casino	Las Vegas	(United States) Jeremy Ausmus (1/2)	$263,250	263	65	$975,000
14	February 6	PokerGO Cup #5	$25,000	No-Limit Hold'em	ARIA Resort & Casino	Las Vegas	(United States) Nick Petrangelo (3/6)	$369,000	221	41	$1,025,000
15	February 7	PokerGO Cup #6	$25,000	No-Limit Hold'em	ARIA Resort & Casino	Las Vegas	(Canada) Daniel Negreanu (1/3)	$350,000	210	35	$875,000
16	February 8	PokerGO Cup #7	$25,000	No-Limit Hold'em	ARIA Resort & Casino	Las Vegas	(Bosnia and Herzegovina) Ali Imsirovic (2/16)	$365,500	219	43	$1,075,000
17	February 9	PokerGO Cup #8	$50,000	No-Limit Hold'em	ARIA Resort & Casino	Las Vegas	(United States) Sean Perry (2/8)	$640,000	384	32	$1,600,000
18	February 24	ARIA High Roller #1	$10,000	No-Limit Hold'em	ARIA Resort & Casino	Las Vegas	(United States) Cary Katz (1/3)	$137,340	137	41	$410,000
19	February 25	ARIA High Roller #2	$10,000	No-Limit Hold'em	ARIA Resort & Casino	Las Vegas	(Bosnia and Herzegovina) Ali Imsirovic (3/17)	$129,600	130	36	$360,000
20	February 26	ARIA High Roller #3	$15,000	No-Limit Hold'em	ARIA Resort & Casino	Las Vegas	(Croatia) Ivan Zufic (1/1)	$198,000	198	33	$495,000
21	March 1	Wynn High Roller #1	$10,200	No-Limit Hold'em	Wynn Las Vegas	Las Vegas	(United States) Jake Schindler (2/6)	$166,600	167	49	$490,000
22	March 2	Wynn High Roller #2	$15,300	No-Limit Hold'em	Wynn Las Vegas	Las Vegas	(Canada) Daniel Negreanu (2/4)	$216,000	216	40	$600,000
23	March 3	Wynn Millions	$10,000	No-Limit Hold'em	Wynn Las Vegas	Las Vegas	(United States) Tony Sinishtaj (1/1)	$1,655,952	1,250	1,075	$10,105,000
24	March 6	Wynn High Roller #3	$10,200	No-Limit Hold'em	Wynn Las Vegas	Las Vegas	(Bosnia and Herzegovina) Ali Imsirovic (4/18)	$180,000	180	60	$600,000
25	March 7	Wynn High Roller #4	$10,200	No-Limit Hold'em	Wynn Las Vegas	Las Vegas	(United States) Bin Weng (1/1)	$189,800	190	73	$730,000
26	March 8	Wynn High Roller #5	$15,300	No-Limit Hold'em	Wynn Las Vegas	Las Vegas	(United States) Brekstyn Schutten (1/1)	$219,300	219	43	$645,000
27	March 16	U.S. Poker Open #1	$10,000	No-Limit Hold'em	ARIA Resort & Casino	Las Vegas	(United States) Shannon Shorr (1/2)	$213,900	214	93	$930,000
28	March 17	U.S. Poker Open #2	$10,000	Pot-Limit Omaha	ARIA Resort & Casino	Las Vegas	(United States) Justin Young (1/1)	$200,200	200	77	$770,000
29	March 18	U.S. Poker Open #3	$10,000	No-Limit Hold'em	ARIA Resort & Casino	Las Vegas	(United States) Adam Hendrix (1/2)	$211,200	211	88	$880,000
30	March 19	U.S. Poker Open #4	$10,000	Big Bet Mix	ARIA Resort & Casino	Las Vegas	(Japan) Tamon Nakamura (1/1)	$169,600	170	53	$530,000
31	March 20	U.S. Poker Open #5	$10,000	No-Limit Hold'em	ARIA Resort & Casino	Las Vegas	(United States) Jeremy Ausmus (2/3)	$178,200	178	66	$660,000
32	March 21	U.S. Poker Open #6	$15,000	8-Game	ARIA Resort & Casino	Las Vegas	(Japan) Tamon Nakamura (2/2)	$239,700	240	47	$705,000
33	March 22	U.S. Poker Open #7	$15,000	No-Limit Hold'em	ARIA Resort & Casino	Las Vegas	(United States) Alex Foxen (2/4)	$283,500	284	70	$1,050,000
34	March 23	U.S. Poker Open #8	$15,000	Pot-Limit Omaha	ARIA Resort & Casino	Las Vegas	(United States) Chino Rheem (1/1)	$271,350	271	67	$1,005,000
35	March 24	U.S. Poker Open #9	$25,000	No-Limit Hold'em	ARIA Resort & Casino	Las Vegas	(United States) Erik Seidel (1/1)	$472,500	284	63	$1,575,000
36	March 25	U.S. Poker Open #10	$25,000	Pot-Limit Omaha	ARIA Resort & Casino	Las Vegas	(United States) Dylan Weisman (1/1)	$416,500	250	49	$1,225,000
37	March 26	U.S. Poker Open #11	$25,000	No-Limit Hold'em	ARIA Resort & Casino	Las Vegas	(United States) Sean Winter (1/3)	$440,000	264	55	$1,375,000
38	March 27	U.S. Poker Open #12	$50,000	No-Limit Hold'em	ARIA Resort & Casino	Las Vegas	(United States) Sean Winter (2/4)	$756,000	454	42	$2,100,000
39	April 2	Triton Cyprus #1	$50,000	No-Limit Hold'em	Merit Royal Hotel & Casino	North Cyprus	(Hungary) Andras Nemeth (1/1)	$1,082,000	700	82	$3,936,000
40	April 3	Triton Cyprus #2	$100,000	No-Limit Hold'em	Merit Royal Hotel & Casino	North Cyprus	(Netherlands) Teun Mulder (1/1)	$1,940,000	450	69	$6,624,000
41	April 4	Triton Cyprus #6	$50,000	No-Limit Hold'em	Merit Royal Hotel & Casino	North Cyprus	(Austria) Matthias Eibinger (1/1)	$676,000	406	41	$1,988,500
42	April 5	Triton Cyprus #3	$75,000	Short Deck	Merit Royal Hotel & Casino	North Cyprus	(United States) Phil Ivey (1/2)	$1,170,000	700	51	$3,706,500
43	April 6	Triton Cyprus #5	$75,000	Short Deck	Merit Royal Hotel & Casino	North Cyprus	(Hong Kong) Winfred Yu (1/1)	$1,010,000	700	41	$2,976,000
44	April 6	Seminole Super High Roller	$50,000	No-Limit Hold'em	Seminole Hard Rock Hotel & Casino	Hollywood	(United States) Andrew Lichtenberger (1/4)	$638,223	383	39	$1,891,500
45	April 7	Super High Roller Series Europe #1	$25,000	Pot-Limit Omaha	Merit Royal Hotel & Casino	North Cyprus	(Netherlands) Tom Vogelsang (1/1)	$360,000	216	40	$1,000,000
46	April 8	Super High Roller Series Europe #2	$50,000	Short Deck	Merit Royal Hotel & Casino	North Cyprus	(Belarus) Mikita Badziakouski (1/3)	$756,000	454	42	$2,100,000
47	April 9	Super High Roller Series Europe #3	$25,000	No-Limit Hold'em	Merit Royal Hotel & Casino	North Cyprus	(Germany) Marius Gierse (1/1)	$432,000	259	64	$1,600,000
48	April 10	Super High Roller Series Europe #4	$50,000	Pot-Limit Omaha	Merit Royal Hotel & Casino	North Cyprus	(United States) Phil Ivey (2/3)	$640,000	384	32	$1,600,000
49	April 11	Super High Roller Series Europe #10	$25,000	No-Limit Hold'em	Merit Royal Hotel & Casino	North Cyprus	(Canada) Timothy Adams (1/1)	$310,000	186	31	$775,000
50	April 11	Super High Roller Series Europe #5	$50,000	Short Deck	Merit Royal Hotel & Casino	North Cyprus	(Hong Kong) Danny Tang (1/1)	$640,000	384	32	$1,600,000
51	April 11	Seminole High Roller	$25,000	No-Limit Hold'em	Seminole Hard Rock Hotel & Casino	Hollywood	(United States) Brian Altman (1/1)	$692,661	416	132	$3,260,400
52	April 12	Super High Roller Series Europe #6	$50,000	No-Limit Hold'em	Merit Royal Hotel & Casino	North Cyprus	(Canada) Daniel Dvoress (1/1)	$731,000	439	43	$2,150,000
53	April 13	Super High Roller Series Europe #7	$25,000	Pot-Limit Omaha	Merit Royal Hotel & Casino	North Cyprus	(Finland) Eelis Parssinen (1/1)	$270,000	162	20	$500,000
54	April 13	Super High Roller Bowl Europe	$250,000	No-Limit Hold'em	Merit Royal Hotel & Casino	North Cyprus	(United States) Jake Schindler (3/7)	$3,200,000	600	32	$8,000,000
55	April 14	Super High Roller Series Europe #8	$50,000	No-Limit Hold'em	Merit Royal Hotel & Casino	North Cyprus	(Hong Kong) Elton Tsang (1/1)	$684,000	410	38	$1,900,000
56	April 15	Super High Roller Series Europe #9	$50,000	No-Limit Hold'em	Merit Royal Hotel & Casino	North Cyprus	(Malaysia) Lee Wai Kiat (1/1)	$513,000	308	19	$950,000
57	April 20	ARIA High Roller #4	$10,000	No-Limit Hold'em	ARIA Resort & Casino	Las Vegas	(Bosnia and Herzegovina) Ali Imsirovic (5/19)	$149,600	150	44	$440,000
58	April 22	ARIA High Roller #5	$10,000	No-Limit Hold'em	ARIA Resort & Casino	Las Vegas	(Bosnia and Herzegovina) Ali Imsirovic (6/20)	$101,903	102	32	$320,000
59	April 23	ARIA High Roller #6	$15,000	No-Limit Hold'em	ARIA Resort & Casino	Las Vegas	(United States) Chris Brewer (1/5)	$126,519	127	23	$345,000
60	May 5	Venetian High Roller #5	$10,000	No-Limit Hold'em	The Venetian Las Vegas	Las Vegas	(United States) Vikenty Shegal (1/2)	$136,000	136	34	$340,000
61	May 6	Venetian High Roller #6	$10,000	No-Limit Hold'em	The Venetian Las Vegas	Las Vegas	(United States) Michael Brinkenhoff (1/1)	$105,800	106	23	$230,000
62	May 7	Venetian High Roller #7	$15,000	No-Limit Hold'em	The Venetian Las Vegas	Las Vegas	(United States) Victoria Livschitz (1/1)	$60,000	60	4	$60,000
63	May 13	Triton Madrid #1	€20,000	No-Limit Hold'em	Casino Gran Via	Spain	(Australia) Michael Addamo (1/7)	€478,000	478	90	€1,800,000
64	May 14	Triton Madrid #2	€30,000	No-Limit Hold'em	Casino Gran Via	Spain	(Malaysia) Paul Phua (1/1)	€740,400	444	93	€2,790,000
65	May 15	Triton Madrid #3	€20,000	Short Deck	Casino Gran Via	Spain	(United States) Chris Brewer (2/6)	€372,000	372	62	€1,240,000
66	May 16	Triton Madrid #5	€25,000	Short Deck	Casino Gran Via	Spain	(France) Rui Cao (1/1)	€497,000	298	69	€1,700,000
67	May 17	Triton Madrid #6	€50,000	No-Limit Hold'em	Casino Gran Via	Spain	(Belarus) Mikita Badziakouski (2/4)	€1,340,000	700	101	€5,050,000
68	May 18	Triton Madrid #7	€75,000	No-Limit Hold'em	Casino Gran Via	Spain	(Australia) Michael Addamo (2/8)	€1,152,086	700	63	€4,725,000
69	May 19	Triton Madrid #8	€50,000	Short Deck	Casino Gran Via	Spain	(Malaysia) Chin Wei Lim (1/1)	€855,000	513	57	€2,850,000
70	May 20	Triton Madrid #9	€100,000	No-Limit Hold'em	Casino Gran Via	Spain	(Denmark) Henrik Hecklen (1/2)	€2,170,509	500	93	€9,300,000
71	May 21	Triton Madrid #10	€50,000	No-Limit Hold'em	Casino Gran Via	Spain	(Hungary) Laszlo Bujtas (1/1)	€630,000	378	37	€1,850,000
72	May 22	Triton Madrid #11	€25,000	Pot-Limit Omaha	Casino Gran Via	Spain	(United States) Tom Dwan (1/1)	€290,000	174	34	€850,000
73	May 23	Triton Madrid #12	€100,000	Short Deck	Casino Gran Via	Spain	(United Kingdom) Stephen Chidwick (1/2)	€1,800,000	450	60	€6,000,000
74	May 24	Triton Madrid #13	€150,000	Short Deck	Casino Gran Via	Spain	(United States) Jason Koon (1/3)	€1,750,000	450	34	€5,100,000
75	May 25	Triton Madrid #14	€30,000	Short Deck	Casino Gran Via	Spain	(United States) Tom Dwan (2/2)	€336,000	202	33	€990,000
76	May 26	PGT Italy #1	€25,000	Pot-Limit Omaha	Casino di Venezia	Italy	(Finland) Lauri Varonen (1/1)	€188,650	113	11	€269,500
77	May 26	PGT Italy #2	€10,000	No-Limit Hold'em	Casino di Venezia	Italy	(Netherlands) Teun Mulder (2/2)	€95,200	95	18	€176,400
78	May 27	PGT Italy #3	€10,000	Short Deck	Casino di Venezia	Italy	(Spain) Santi Jiang (1/2)	€89,150	89	13	€127,400
79	May 27	PGT Italy #4	€15,000	No-Limit Hold'em	Casino di Venezia	Italy	(Hong Kong) Wayne Heung (1/1)	€161,000	161	24	€352,800
80	May 28	PGT Italy #5	€15,000	Pot-Limit Omaha	Casino di Venezia	Italy	(Finland) Aku Joentausta (1/1)	€103,000	103	10	€147,000
81	May 31	WSOP #2	$100,000	No-Limit Hold'em	Bally's / Paris	Las Vegas	(United States) David Peters (1/4)	$1,166,810	400	46	$4,450,500
82	June 2	WSOP #6	$25,000	No-Limit Hold'em	Bally's / Paris	Las Vegas	(United States) Dan Smith (1/2)	$509,717	306	64	$1,512,000
83	June 3	ARIA High Roller #7	$10,000	No-Limit Hold'em	ARIA Resort & Casino	Las Vegas	(United States) Ed Sebesta (1/1)	$120,000	120	30	$300,000
84	June 4	WSOP #8	$25,000	No-Limit Hold'em	Bally's / Paris	Las Vegas	(United States) Chad Eveslage (1/2)	$1,415,610	700	251	$5,929,875
85	June 5	WSOP #10	$10,000	Dealers Choice	Bally's / Paris	Las Vegas	(United States) Benjamin Diebold (1/1)	$299,488	299	112	$1,146,975
86	June 6	WSOP #12	$50,000	No-Limit Hold'em	Bally's / Paris	Las Vegas	(United States) Jake Schindler (4/8)	$1,328,068	700	101	$4,835,375
87	June 7	WSOP #15	$10,000	Omaha Hi-Lo	Bally's / Paris	Las Vegas	(United States) Daniel Zack (1/1)	$440,757	441	196	$1,827,700
88	June 9	WSOP #19	$25,000	Pot-Limit Omaha	Bally's / Paris	Las Vegas	(China) Tong Li (1/1)	$1,467,739	700	264	$6,237,000
89	June 10	WSOP #22	$10,000	Seven-Card Stud	Bally's / Paris	Las Vegas	(United States) Adam Friedman (1/2)	$248,254	248	96	$885,875
90	June 12	WSOP #26	$10,000	Limit Hold'em	Bally's / Paris	Las Vegas	(Canada) Jonathan Cohen (1/1)	$245,678	246	92	$857,900
91	June 13	WSOP #28	$50,000	Pot-Limit Omaha	Bally's / Paris	Las Vegas	(United Kingdom) Robert Cowen (1/1)	$1,393,816	700	106	$5,074,750
92	June 14	WSOP #31	$10,000	2-7 Triple Draw	Bally's / Paris	Las Vegas	(United States) Brian Hastings (1/2)	$292,146	292	118	$1,100,350
93	June 17	WSOP #38	$10,000	No-Limit 2-7 Single Draw	Bally's / Paris	Las Vegas	(Brazil) Pedro Bromfman (1/1)	$294,616	295	121	$1,128,325
94	June 18	WSOP #40	$10,000	Seven-Card Stud Hi-Lo	Bally's / Paris	Las Vegas	(United States) Daniel Zack (2/2)	$324,174	324	137	$1,277,525
95	June 19	WSOP #42	$100,000	No-Limit Hold'em	Bally's / Paris	Las Vegas	(Latvia) Aleksejs Ponakovs (1/1)	$1,897,363	450	62	$5,998,500
96	June 20	WSOP #44	$10,000	H.O.R.S.E.	Bally's / Paris	Las Vegas	(United States) Andrew Yeh (1/1)	$487,129	487	209	$1,948,925
97	June 23	WSOP #50	$250,000	No-Limit Hold'em	Bally's / Paris	Las Vegas	(United States) Alex Foxen (3/5)	$4,563,700	700	56	$13,944,000
98	June 26	WSOP #56	$50,000	Poker Players Championship	Bally's / Paris	Las Vegas	(United States) Daniel Cates (1/2)	$1,449,103	700	112	$5,362,000
99	June 27	ARIA High Roller #8	$10,000	No-Limit Hold'em	ARIA Resort & Casino	Las Vegas	(United States) Alex Foxen (4/6)	$88,118	88	23	$230,000
100	June 28	WSOP #60	$10,000	Short Deck	Bally's / Paris	Las Vegas	(Japan) Shota Nakanishi (1/1)	$277,212	277	110	$1,025,740
101	June 29	WSOP #63	$10,000	Pot-Limit Omaha Hi-Lo	Bally's / Paris	Las Vegas	(Israel) Eli Elezra (1/2)	$611,362	611	284	$2,648,300
102	July 1	WSOP #67	$10,000	No-Limit Hold'em	Bally's / Paris	Las Vegas	(Argentina) Nacho Barbero (1/1)	$587,520	588	419	$3,907,175
103	July 2	WSOP #69	$10,000	Pot-Limit Omaha	Bally's / Paris	Las Vegas	(United States) Sean Troha (1/1)	$1,246,770	1,200	683	$6,368,975
104	July 3	WSOP #70	$10,000	No-Limit Hold'em	Bally's / Paris	Las Vegas	(Norway) Espen Jørstad (1/1)	$10,000,000	2,100	8,663	$80,782,475
105	July 5	ARIA High Roller #10	$10,000	No-Limit Hold'em	ARIA Resort & Casino	Las Vegas	(United States) Matt Bond (1/1)	$153,000	153	45	$450,000
106	July 6	ARIA High Roller #11	$10,000	No-Limit Hold'em	ARIA Resort & Casino	Las Vegas	(Japan) Kazuhiko Yotsushika (1/1)	$156,400	156	46	$460,000
107	July 7	ARIA High Roller #12	$10,000	No-Limit Hold'em	ARIA Resort & Casino	Las Vegas	(Latvia) Aleksejs Ponakovs (2/2)	$171,000	171	57	$570,000
108	July 8	ARIA High Roller #13	$10,000	No-Limit Hold'em	ARIA Resort & Casino	Las Vegas	(United States) Victoria Livschitz (2/2)	$162,790	163	68	$680,000
109	July 9	ARIA High Roller #14	$10,000	No-Limit Hold'em	ARIA Resort & Casino	Las Vegas	(United Kingdom) Stephen Chidwick (2/3)	$174,000	174	58	$580,000
110	July 10	ARIA High Roller #15	$10,000	No-Limit Hold'em	ARIA Resort & Casino	Las Vegas	(Norway) Tom-Aksel Bedell (1/1)	$124,000	124	31	$310,000
111	July 11	ARIA High Roller #16	$10,000	No-Limit Hold'em	ARIA Resort & Casino	Las Vegas	(United States) Justin Bonomo (1/4)	$124,200	124	27	$270,000
112	July 12	WSOP #79	$10,000	Razz	Bally's / Paris	Las Vegas	(France) Julien Martini (1/1)	$328,906	329	139	$1,296,175
113	July 13	ARIA High Roller #17	$10,000	No-Limit Hold'em	ARIA Resort & Casino	Las Vegas	(Japan) Kazuhiko Yotsushika (2/2)	$116,000	116	29	$290,000
114	July 14	WSOP #83	$50,000	No-Limit Hold'em	Bally's / Paris	Las Vegas	(Portugal) João Vieira (1/1)	$1,384,413	700	107	$5,122,627
115	July 15	WSOP #86	$10,000	No-Limit Hold'em	Bally's / Paris	Las Vegas	(United States) Gregory Jensen (1/1)	$824,649	825	394	$3,674,050
116	July 17	ARIA High Roller #18	$10,000	No-Limit Hold'em	ARIA Resort & Casino	Las Vegas	(United Kingdom) Stephen Chidwick (3/4)	$84,640	85	22	$220,000
117	July 18	ARIA High Roller #19	$10,000	No-Limit Hold'em	ARIA Resort & Casino	Las Vegas	(United Kingdom) Stephen Chidwick (4/5)	$115,000	115	25	$250,000
118	July 19	ARIA High Roller #20	$10,000	No-Limit Hold'em	ARIA Resort & Casino	Las Vegas	(United States) Jared Jaffee (1/1)	$110,400	110	24	$240,000
119	August 3	Seminole High Roller	$25,000	Pot-Limit Omaha	Seminole Hard Rock Hotel & Casino	Hollywood	(United States) Melad Marji (1/1)	$443,118	266	52	$1,284,400
120	August 4	Seminole Super High Roller	$50,000	No-Limit Hold'em	Seminole Hard Rock Hotel & Casino	Hollywood	(United States) David Peters (2/5)	$407,545	245	25	$1,212,500
121	August 8	Seminole High Roller	$25,000	No-Limit Hold'em	Seminole Hard Rock Hotel & Casino	Hollywood	(United States) Nolan King (1/1)	$713,190	428	105	$2,593,500
122	August 9	Seminole High Roller	$10,000	No-Limit Hold'em	Seminole Hard Rock Hotel & Casino	Hollywood	(United States) Ed Sebesta (2/2)	$311,915	312	111	$1,065,600
123	August 31	Seminole Tampa High Roller	$25,000	No-Limit Hold'em	Seminole Hard Rock Hotel & Casino	Tampa	(United States) John Racener (1/1)	$246,990	148	25	$617,500
124	September 5	Triton Mediterranean Poker Party #1	$25,000	No-Limit Hold'em	Merit Royal Diamond	North Cyprus	(Finland) Patrik Antonius (1/1)	$825,000	495	132	$3,275,000
125	September 5	Seminole Tampa High Roller	$10,000	No-Limit Hold'em	Seminole Hard Rock Hotel & Casino	Tampa	(United States) Clemen Deng (1/1)	$158,778	159	60	$595,200
126	September 6	Triton Mediterranean Poker Party #2	$50,000	No-Limit Hold'em	Merit Royal Diamond	North Cyprus	(United States) Ben Tollerene (1/1)	$930,000	558	123	$3,698,100
127	September 7	Triton Mediterranean Poker Party #3	$50,000	No-Limit Hold'em	Merit Royal Diamond	North Cyprus	(Belgium) Pieter Aerts (1/1)	$1,472,000	700	117	$5,850,000
128	September 8	Triton Mediterranean Poker Party #5	$75,000	No-Limit Hold'em	Merit Royal Diamond	North Cyprus	(Australia) Kahle Burns (1/1)	$1,730,000	750	88	$6,600,000
129	September 11	Triton Mediterranean Poker Party #7	$25,000	Pot-Limit Omaha	Merit Royal Diamond	North Cyprus	(Cyprus) Christopher Philippou (1/1)	$270,000	162	32	$800,000
130	September 12	Triton Mediterranean Poker Party #8	$100,000	No-Limit Hold'em	Merit Royal Diamond	North Cyprus	(Thailand) Punnat Punsri (3/3)	$2,600,000	550	99	$9,900,000
131	September 13	Triton Mediterranean Poker Party #9	$50,000	No-Limit Hold'em	Merit Royal Diamond	North Cyprus	(Austria) Matthias Eibinger (2/2)	545,000	327	32	$1,600,000
132	September 14	Triton Mediterranean Poker Party #10	$30,000	Short Deck	Merit Royal Diamond	North Cyprus	(United States) Phil Ivey (3/4)	$387,000	232	38	$1,140,000
133	September 15	Triton Mediterranean Poker Party #11	$40,000	Short Deck	Merit Royal Diamond	North Cyprus	(France) Karl Chappe-Gatien (1/1)	$565,000	339	45	$1,800,000
134	September 16	Triton Mediterranean Poker Party #12	$50,000	Short Deck	Merit Royal Diamond	North Cyprus	(Canada) Sam Greenwood (1/1)	$341,275	205	30	$1,500,000
135	September 17	Stairway To Millions #9	$10,400	No-Limit Hold'em	The Venetian Las Vegas	Las Vegas	(United States) Michael Rocco (1/1)	$87,250	87	18	$200,000
136	September 18	Stairway To Millions #10	$15,800	No-Limit Hold'em	The Venetian Las Vegas	Las Vegas	(United States) Paul Zappulla (1/1)	$124,500	125	18	$300,000
137	September 21	Poker Masters #1	$10,000	No-Limit Hold'em	ARIA Resort & Casino	Las Vegas	(United States) Jeremy Ausmus (3/4)	$204,000	204	85	$850,000
138	September 22	Poker Masters #2	$10,000	No-Limit Hold'em	ARIA Resort & Casino	Las Vegas	(United States) Ethan Yau (1/1)	$197,600	198	76	$760,000
139	September 23	Poker Masters #3	$10,000	Pot-Limit Omaha	ARIA Resort & Casino	Las Vegas	(Netherlands) Ronald Keijzer (1/1)	$202,500	203	81	$810,000
140	September 24	Poker Masters #4	$10,000	No-Limit Hold'em	ARIA Resort & Casino	Las Vegas	(United States) Adam Hendrix (2/3)	$192,400	192	74	$740,000
141	September 26	Poker Masters #5	$10,000	8-Game	ARIA Resort & Casino	Las Vegas	(United States) Nick Guagenti (1/1)	$186,000	186	62	$620,000
142	September 27	Poker Masters #6	$10,000	No-Limit Hold'em	ARIA Resort & Casino	Las Vegas	(United States) Martin Zamani (1/1)	$223,100	223	97	$970,000
143	September 28	Poker Masters #7	$25,000	No-Limit Hold'em	ARIA Resort & Casino	Las Vegas	(United States) Andrew Lichtenberger (2/5)	$465,750	279	69	$1,725,000
144	September 29	Poker Masters #8	$25,000	Pot-Limit Omaha	ARIA Resort & Casino	Las Vegas	(United Kingdom) Tony Bloom (1/1)	$360,000	216	40	$1,000,000
145	September 30	Poker Masters #9	$25,000	No-Limit Hold'em	ARIA Resort & Casino	Las Vegas	(United States) Sean Winter (3/5)	$432,000	259	54	$1,350,000
146	October 1	Poker Masters #10	$55,000	No-Limit Hold'em	ARIA Resort & Casino	Las Vegas	(United States) Jason Koon (2/4)	$666,000	400	37	$1,850,000
147	October 3	ARIA High Roller #21	$25,000	No-Limit Hold'em	ARIA Resort & Casino	Las Vegas	(United States) Daniel Colpoys (2/2)	$287,500	173	25	$625,000
148	October 4	ARIA High Roller #22	$25,000	No-Limit Hold'em	ARIA Resort & Casino	Las Vegas	(United Kingdom) Talal Shakerchi (1/1)	$264,500	159	23	$575,000
149	October 5	Super High Roller Bowl VII	$300,000	No-Limit Hold'em	ARIA Resort & Casino	Las Vegas	(Canada) Daniel Negreanu (3/5)	$3,312,000	600	24	$7,200,000
150	October 6	ARIA High Roller #23	$10,000	No-Limit Hold'em	ARIA Resort & Casino	Las Vegas	(Spain) Adrian Mateos (1/3)	$50,000	50	5	$50,000
151	October 7	ARIA High Roller #24	$15,000	No-Limit Hold'em	ARIA Resort & Casino	Las Vegas	(United States) Isaac Haxton (1/1)	$50,400	50	6	$90,000
152	October 8	Bellagio High Roller #1	$25,000	No-Limit Hold'em	Bellagio Las Vegas	Las Vegas	(United States) Steve Zolotow (1/1)	$135,000	81	9	$225,000
153	October 10	Bellagio High Roller #3	$10,000	No-Limit Hold'em	Bellagio Las Vegas	Las Vegas	(United States) Nick Schulman (2/2)	$68,256	68	15	$150,000
154	October 11	Bellagio High Roller #4	$10,000	8-Game	Bellagio Las Vegas	Las Vegas	(Israel) Eli Elezra (2/3)	$57,000	57	12	$120,000
155	October 12	Bellagio High Roller #5	$10,000	No-Limit Hold'em	Bellagio Las Vegas	Las Vegas	(United States) Justin Bonomo (2/5)	$75,792	76	16	$160,000
156	October 13	Bellagio High Roller #6	$10,000	Pot-Limit Omaha	Bellagio Las Vegas	Las Vegas	(Argentina) Michael Duek (1/1)	$105,800	106	23	$230,000
157	October 14	Bellagio High Roller #7	$10,000	No-Limit Hold'em	Bellagio Las Vegas	Las Vegas	(Taiwan) Pete Chen (1/1)	$97,200	97	18	$180,000
158	October 15	Bellagio High Roller #8	$10,000	Pot-Limit Omaha	Bellagio Las Vegas	Las Vegas	(Netherlands) Ronald Keijzer (2/2)	$108,000	108	20	$200,000
159	October 16	Bellagio High Roller #9	$10,000	No-Limit Hold'em	Bellagio Las Vegas	Las Vegas	(United Kingdom) Stephen Chidwick (5/6)	$25,000	25	4	$40,000
160	October 17	Bellagio High Roller #10	$25,000	Pot-Limit Omaha	Bellagio Las Vegas	Las Vegas	(United States) Isaac Kempton (1/1)	$264,500	159	23	$575,000
161	October 18	Bellagio High Roller #11	$25,000	No-Limit Hold'em	Bellagio Las Vegas	Las Vegas	(United States) Justin Bonomo (3/6)	$229,500	138	17	$425,000
162	October 19	WPT Five Diamond	$10,400	No-Limit Hold'em	Bellagio Las Vegas	Las Vegas	(United States) Chad Eveslage (2/3)	$1,042,300	1,200	569	$5,519,300
163	November 7	WSOP Europe #8	€25,000	No-Limit Hold'em	King's Casino	Czech Republic	(Malaysia) Paul Phua (2/2)	€481,509	289	67	€1,565,790
164	November 10	WSOP Europe #11	€50,000	No-Limit Hold'em	King's Casino	Czech Republic	(Turkey) Orpen Kisacikoglu (2/3)	€753,752	449	45	€2,116,125
165	November 11	WSOP Europe #12	€10,350	No-Limit Hold'em	King's Casino	Czech Republic	(Sweden) Omar Eljach (1/1)	€1,418,280	1,200	763	€7,248,500
166	December 1	ARIA High Roller #25	$15,000	No-Limit Hold'em	ARIA Resort & Casino	Las Vegas	(United States) Brian Kim (1/1)	$101,200	101	22	$220,000
167	December 7	ARIA High Roller #30	$10,000	No-Limit Hold'em	ARIA Resort & Casino	Las Vegas	(United States) Jeremy Ausmus (4/5)	$111,520	112	28	$280,000
168	December 8	ARIA High Roller #31	$10,000	No-Limit Hold'em	ARIA Resort & Casino	Las Vegas	(United Kingdom) Stephen Chidwick (6/7)	$108,000	108	20	$200,000
169	December 9	ARIA High Roller #32	$10,000	No-Limit Hold'em	ARIA Resort & Casino	Las Vegas	(United States) Cary Katz (2/4)	$104,000	104	20	$200,000
170	December 10	ARIA High Roller #33	$10,000	No-Limit Hold'em	ARIA Resort & Casino	Las Vegas	(United States) Sam Soverel (1/4)	$102,600	103	19	$190,000
171	December 12	WPT World Championship	$10,400	No-Limit Hold'em	Wynn Las Vegas	Las Vegas	(Canada) Eliot Hudon (1/1)	$4,136,000	1,500	2,960	$29,008,000
172	December 16	ARIA High Roller #34	$10,000	No-Limit Hold'em	ARIA Resort & Casino	Las Vegas	(United States) Brian Batt (1/1)	$84,000	84	12	$120,000
173	December 19	ARIA High Roller #35	$10,000	No-Limit Hold'em	ARIA Resort & Casino	Las Vegas	(United States) Justin Bonomo (4/7)	$119,600	120	26	$260,000
174	December 20	ARIA High Roller #36	$10,000	No-Limit Hold'em	ARIA Resort & Casino	Las Vegas	(South Korea) Sung Joo Hyun (1/1)	$140,400	140	39	$390,000
175	December 21	PGT Championship	--	No-Limit Hold'em	ARIA Resort & Casino	Las Vegas	(United States) Jason Koon (3/5)	$500,000	--	15	$500,000
