= 2022 PokerGO Cup =

Series of poker tournaments

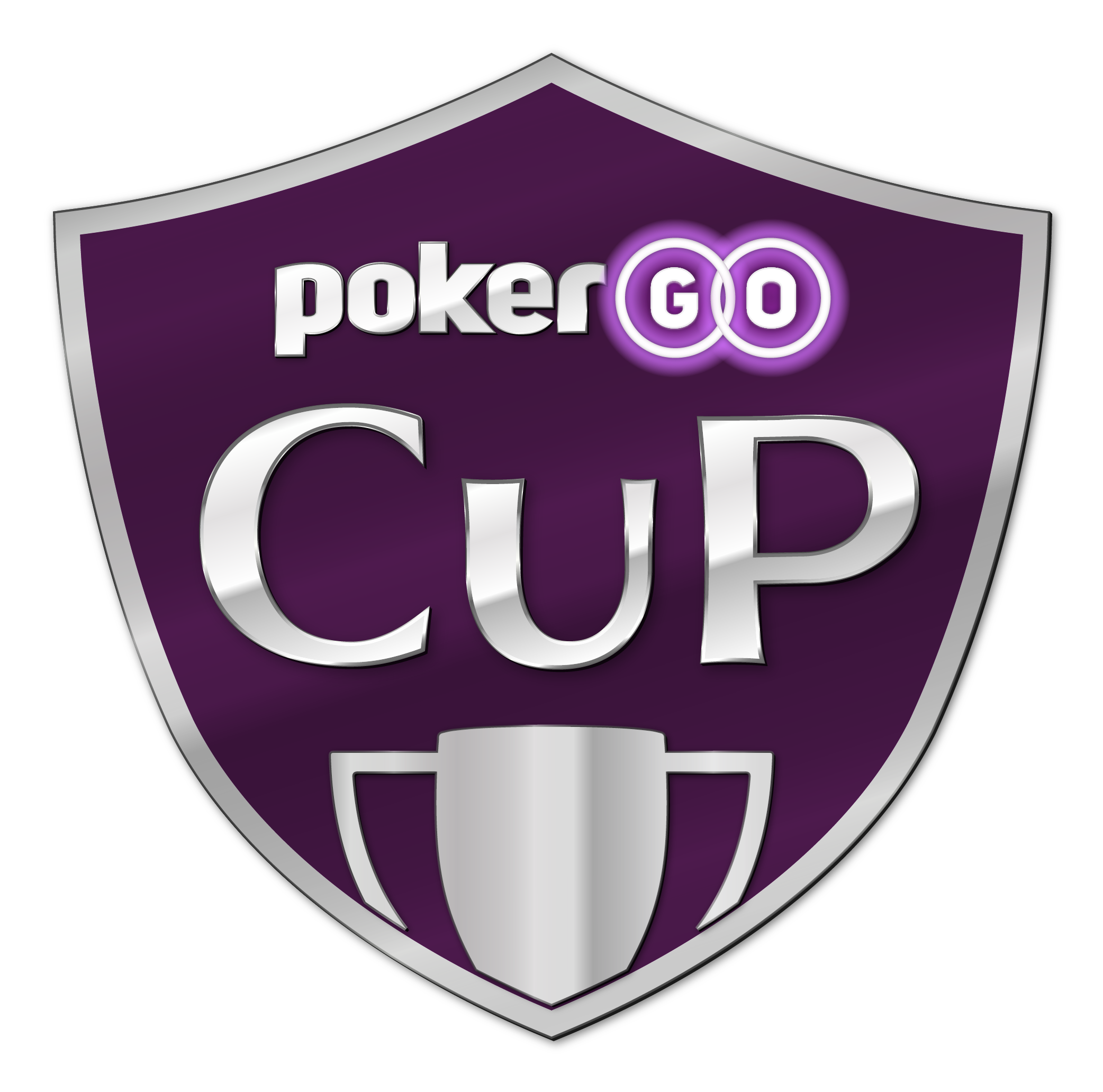
- Venue: PokerGO Studio at Aria Resort and Casino
- Location: Las Vegas, Nevada
- Dates: February 2–10, 2022

Champion
- (United States) Jeremy Ausmus (PokerGO Cup winner); (United States) Sean Perry (Main Event winner)

The 2022 PokerGO Cup was the second iteration of the PokerGO Cup, a series of high-stakes poker tournaments as part of the PokerGO Tour. It was held from inside the PokerGO Studio at Aria Resort & Casino in Las Vegas, Nevada. The series took place from February 2–10, 2022, with eight scheduled events culminating in a $100,000 No-Limit Hold'em tournament.

The player who earns the most points throughout the series would be crowned the PokerGO Cup champion earning the PokerGO Cup.

The Main Event was won by Sean Perry, and the PokerGO Cup was awarded to Jeremy Ausmus.

== Schedule ==
#	Event	Entrants	Winner	Prize	Winning hand	Runner-up	Losing hand	Results
1	$10,000 No-Limit Hold'em	77	(United States) Daniel Colpoys	$200,200	9♥ 9♦	(United States) Andrew Lichtenberger	A♣ 4♣	Results
2	$10,000 No-Limit Hold'em	80	(United States) Sean Perry	$200,000	K♥ 3♥	(United States) Cary Katz	A♥ K♣	Results
3	$10,000 No-Limit Hold'em	80	(United States) Jake Daniels	$200,000	J♥ 2♥	(United States) Jeremy Ausmus	A♠ J♣	Results
4	$15,000 No-Limit Hold'em	65	(United States) Jeremy Ausmus	$263,250	Q♠ 3♣	(United States) Brock Wilson	A♣ 4♥	Results
5	$25,000 No-Limit Hold'em	41	(United States) Nick Petrangelo	$369,000	A♣ 9♥	(United States) Bill Klein	Q♦ J♦	Results
6	$25,000 No-Limit Hold'em	35	(Canada) Daniel Negreanu	$350,000	A♣ J♣	(United States) Sean Winter	Q♣ 10♣	Results
7	$25,000 No-Limit Hold'em	43	(Bosnia and Herzegovina) Ali Imsirovic	$365,500	9♦ 4♦	(United States) Sam Soverel	A♥ 2♣	Results
8	$50,000 No-Limit Hold'em	32	(United States) Sean Perry	$640,000	J♠ J♣	(United States) Brock Wilson	K♣ Q♣	Results

== Series leaderboard ==
The 2022 PokerGO Cup will award the PokerGO Cup to the player that accumulates the most PokerGO Tour points during the series. American Jeremy Ausmus won one event and cashed four times on his way to accumulating $824,500 in winnings. Ausmus accumulated 658 points and was awarded the PokerGO Cup.

Standings
Rank	Name	Points	Earnings
1	(United States) Jeremy Ausmus	658	$824,500
2	(United States) Sean Perry	616	$872,000
3	(United States) Brock Wilson	570	$760,250
4	(United States) Cary Katz	346	$379,850
5	(Bosnia and Herzegovina) Ali Imsirovic	300	$479,500
6	(United States) Nick Schulman	299	$482,250
7	(Canada) Daniel Negreanu	277	$462,000
8	(United States) Sean Winter	269	$404,250
9	(United States) Bill Klein	246	$343,500
10	(United States) Darren Elias	234	$279,850

== Results ==
=== Event #1: $10,000 No-Limit Hold'em ===
- 2-Day Event: February 2–3
- Number of Entries: 77
- Total Prize Pool: $770,000
- Number of Payouts: 11
- Winning Hand: 9♥ 9♦

Final Table
Place	Name	Prize
1st	(United States) Daniel Colpoys	$200,200
2nd	(United States) Andrew Lichtenberger	$146,300
3rd	(United States) Darren Elias	$100,100
4th	(United States) Matthew Wantman	$77,000
5th	(United States) Scott Ball	$61,600
6th	(United States) Michael Lang	$46,200

=== Event #2: $10,000 No-Limit Hold'em ===
- 2-Day Event: February 3–4
- Number of Entries: 80
- Total Prize Pool: $800,000
- Number of Payouts: 12
- Winning Hand: K♥ 3♥

Final Table
Place	Name	Prize
1st	(United States) Sean Perry	$200,000
2nd	(United States) Cary Katz	$144,000
3rd	(United States) Bryn Kenney	$96,000
4th	(United States) Scott Ball	$80,000
5th	(United States) Darren Elias	$64,000
6th	(United States) Dan Shak	$48,000

=== Event #3: $10,000 No-Limit Hold'em ===
- 2-Day Event: February 4–5
- Number of Entries: 80
- Total Prize Pool: $800,000
- Number of Payouts: 12
- Winning Hand: J♥ 2♥

Final Table
Place	Name	Prize
1st	(United States) Jake Daniels	$200,000
2nd	(United States) Jeremy Ausmus	$144,000
3rd	(Canada) Daniel Weinand	$96,000
4th	(England) Chris Moorman	$80,000
5th	(United States) Sean Winter	$64,000
6th	(United States) Brock Wilson	$48,000

=== Event #4: $15,000 No-Limit Hold'em ===
- 2-Day Event: February 5–6
- Number of Entries: 65
- Total Prize Pool: $975,000
- Number of Payouts: 10
- Winning Hand: Q♠ 3♣

Final Table
Place	Name	Prize
1st	(United States) Jeremy Ausmus	$263,250
2nd	(United States) Brock Wilson	$195,000
3rd	(United States) Cary Katz	$126,750
4th	(United States) Bill Klein	$97,500
5th	(United States) Justin Saliba	$78,000
6th	(United States) Jesse Lonis	$58,500

=== Event #5: $25,000 No-Limit Hold'em ===
- 2-Day Event: February 6–7
- Number of Entries: 41
- Total Prize Pool: $1,025,000
- Number of Payouts: 6
- Winning Hand: A♣ 9♥

Final Table
Place	Name	Prize
1st	(United States) Nick Petrangelo	$369,000
2nd	(United States) Bill Klein	$246,000
3rd	(United States) Nick Schulman	$164,000
4th	(United States) Sean Winter	$112,750
5th	(Bosnia and Herzegovina) Ali Imsirovic	$82,000
6th	(United States) Darren Elias	$51,250

=== Event #6: $25,000 No-Limit Hold'em ===
- 2-Day Event: February 7–8
- Number of Entries: 35
- Total Prize Pool: $875,000
- Number of Payouts: 5
- Winning Hand: A♣ J♣

Final Table
Place	Name	Prize
1st	(Canada) Daniel Negreanu	$350,000
2nd	(United States) Sean Winter	$227,500
3rd	(United States) Vikenty Shegal	$140,000
4th	(England) Stephen Chidwick	$96,250
5th	(United States) Brock Wilson	$61,250

=== Event #7: $25,000 No-Limit Hold'em ===
- 2-Day Event: February 8–9
- Number of Entries: 43
- Total Prize Pool: $1,075,000
- Number of Payouts: 7
- Winning Hand: 9♦ 4♦

Final Table
Place	Name	Prize
1st	(Bosnia and Herzegovina) Ali Imsirovic	$365,500
2nd	(United States) Sam Soverel	$236,500
3rd	(United States) Jeremy Ausmus	$161,250
4th	(United States) Nick Schulman	$118,250
5th	(United States) Cary Katz	$86,000
6th	(United States) Darren Elias	$64,500

=== Event #8: $50,000 No-Limit Hold'em ===
- 2-Day Event: February 9–10
- Number of Entries: 32
- Total Prize Pool: $1,600,000
- Number of Payouts: 5
- Winning Hand: J♠ J♣

Final Table
Place	Name	Prize
1st	(United States) Sean Perry	$640,000
2nd	(United States) Brock Wilson	$416,000
3rd	(United States) Jeremy Ausmus	$256,000
4th	(United States) Nick Schulman	$176,000
5th	(Canada) Daniel Negreanu	$112,000
