= Nick Schulman =

American poker player (born 1984)

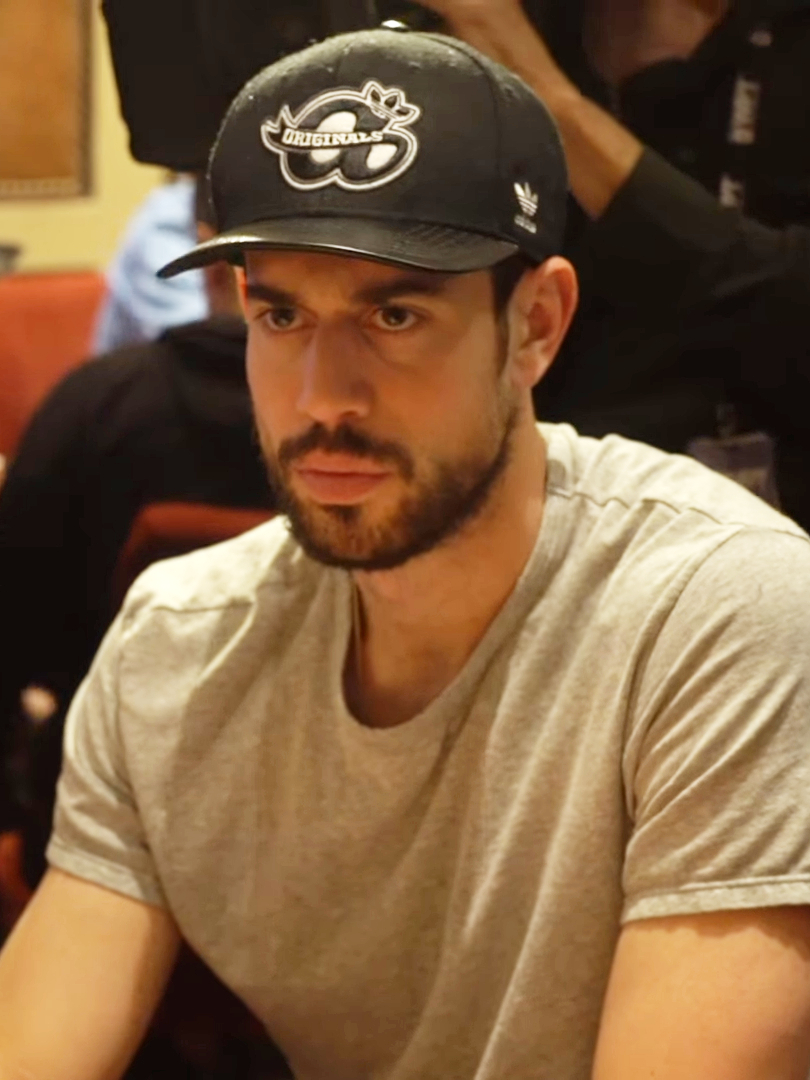
- Schulman at 2018 WPT Bellagio High Roller
- Nickname: The Takeover
- Born: September 18, 1984 (age 42)

World Series of Poker
- Bracelets: 8
- Final tables: 22
- Money finishes: 70
- Highest WSOP Main Event finish: 109th, 2020

World Poker Tour
- Title: 1
- Final tables: 5
- Money finishes: 15

European Poker Tour
- Title: None
- Final table: None
- Money finishes: 2

Nick Schulman (born September 18, 1984) is an American professional poker player and commentator. He is a member of the Poker Hall of Fame, inducted at age 40.

== Early life ==
Schulman was born and raised in New York City, and began playing pool at the famous Amsterdam Billiards. He was mentored by several of the best players in the NYC area from ages 13–19, at which point his focus switched to poker.

== Poker career ==
Schulman began to play poker in 2002, at the age of 18, and by the age of 19 went professional. In 2005, at the age of 21, he won the fourth season World Poker Tour (WPT) World Poker Finals poker tournament, winning $2,167,500, a record for a regular season event on the WPT. He also became the youngest winner of a WPT event.

Less than a month later, Schulman finished 4th in the World Series of Poker circuit event in Atlantic City, winning an additional $74,495. In April 2006, Schulman won the WPT Battle of Champions IV event, eliminating Freddy Deeb to take the title. Prior to winning the WPT event, Schulman had regularly played poker on the internet.

On June 12, 2009, Schulman won his first WSOP bracelet in the $10,000 World Championship No Limit Deuce to Seven Draw event, defeating a final table that included John Juanda, David Benyamine, and Michael Binger. In July 2012, he won his second WSOP bracelet in the same event, taking home $294,321 in winnings.

In October 2018, he made an appearance on PokerGO’s revived version of Poker After Dark and after the retirement of Gabe Kaplan, he replaced him in High Stakes Poker in the second episode of Season 10.

During the 2019 WSOP Main Event, Schulman was doing commentary for the coverage by ESPN and PokerGO. Schulman won his fifth career WSOP bracelet at the 2024 WSOP in the $25,000 High Roller Event for $1,667,842.

On June 26, 2025, Schulman won his third 10k NL 2-7 tournament at the world series for his seventh bracelet, and has the most earnings in the history of the world series at that respective discipline.

He is a regular player of the high stakes cash game room “Bobby’s Room, recently officially renamed “Legends Room”, at the Bellagio, in Las Vegas.

On July 11th, 2025, Schulman became just the 62nd player to be inducted into the Poker Hall of Fame.

As of 2026, his total career live tournament winnings exceed $26,306,104.

World Series of Poker Bracelets
Year	Tournament	Prize (US$)
2009	$10,000 Deuce-to-Seven Lowball World Championship (No Limit)	$279,742
2012	$10,000 Deuce-to-Seven Lowball World Championship (No Limit)	$294,321
2019	$10,000 Pot Limit Omaha Hi-Lo 8 or Better	$463,670
2023	$1,500 7-Card Stud	$110,800
2024	$25,000 High Roller No Limit Hold'em (8-Handed)	$1,667,842
2024P	$5,000 The Closer No-Limit Hold'em Bounty Turbo	$145,000
2025	$10,000 No-Limit 2–7 Lowball Draw Championship	$497,356
2026	$1,500 H.O.R.S.E	$183,366

A "P" following a year denotes bracelet(s) won during the World Series of Poker Paradise

World Poker Tour Titles
Year	Tournament	Prize (US$)
2005	$10,000 World Poker Finals	$2,167,500

=== Poker Go Tour Titles ===
Year	Tournament	Prize (US$)
2022	Bellagio High Roller #3- $10,000 NLH	$68,256
2023	Poker Masters #7 - $25,000 NLH	$374,000
2023	PGT Mixed Games II #5 - $10,200 Triple Stud Mix	$144,000
2024	PGT Last Chance #6: $10,100 No-Limit Hold'em	$161,500
2025	PGT Last Chance #1: $10,100 No-Limit Hold'em	$283,050
2025	WSOP #30 - $10,000 No-Limit 2-7 Single Draw Championship	$497,356
