= 2021 World Series of Poker results =

Below are the results of the 2021 World Series of Poker, being held from September 30-November 23 at the Rio All-Suite Hotel and Casino in Las Vegas, Nevada.

== Key ==
*	Elected to the Poker Hall of Fame
(#/#)	This denotes a bracelet winner. The first number is the number of bracelets won in the 2021 WSOP. The second number is the total number of bracelets won. Both numbers represent totals as of that point during the tournament.
Place	What place each player at the final table finished
Name	The player who made it to the final table
Prize (US$)	The amount of money awarded for each finish at the event's final table

== Results ==
=== Event #1: $500 Casino Employees No-Limit Hold'em ===
- 2-Day Event: September 30-October 1
- Number of Entries: 419
- Total Prize Pool: $175,980
- Number of Payouts: 63
- Winning Hand: J♦ 2♦

Final Table
Place	Name	Prize
1st	(United States) James Barnett (1/1)	$39,013
2nd	(United States) Jack Behrens	$24,112
3rd	(United States) Danny Chang	$16,540
4th	(United States) Leo Abbe	$11,387
5th	(United States) Bryan Garrett	$8,294
6th	(United States) Bobby Schmidt	$6,069
7th	(United States) Chris Minton	$4,542
8th	(United States) Rico Cuevas	$3,478
9th	(United States) Ronald Baltazar	$2,727

=== Event #2 $25,000 H.O.R.S.E. ===
- 3-Day Event: September 30-October 2
- Number of Entries: 78
- Total Prize Pool: $1,842,750
- Number of Payouts: 12
- Winning Hand: A♠ 7♠ A♦ 2♦ 4♦ 5♦ 4♠ (Seven Card Stud)

Final Table
Place	Name	Prize
1st	(United States) Jesse Klein (1/1)	$552,182
2nd	(United Kingdom) Benny Glaser (0/3)	$341,274
3rd	(France) David Benyamine (0/1)	$236,626
4th	(United States) Chad Eveslage	$169,218
5th	(United States) Philip Sternheimer	$124,935
6th	(United States) Phil Hellmuth (0/15)	$95,329
7th	(United States) Ben Yu (0/3)	$75,260
8th	(United States) DJ Buckley	$61,549

=== Event #3: $1,000 Covid-19 Relief No-Limit Hold'em ===
- 2-Day Event: September 30-October 1
- Number of Entries: 260
- Total Prize Pool: $231,400
- Number of Payouts: 39
- Winning Hand: A♣ 9♣

Final Table
Place	Name	Prize
1st	(United States) Jeremy Ausmus (1/2)	$48,681
2nd	(United States) Jesse Lonis	$30,086
3rd	(United States) Mitchell Halverson (1/1)	$20,541
4th	(United States) Asher Conniff	$14,386
5th	(United States) Steve Gross (0/1)	$10,342
6th	(Israel) Liran Betito	$7,637
7th	(United States) Craig Mason	$5,798
8th	(United States) Evgeni Tourevski	$4,528
9th	(United States) John Yocca	$3,641

=== Event #4: $500 The Reunion No-Limit Hold'em ===
- 5-Day Event: October 1–5
- Number of Entries: 12,973
- Total Prize Pool: $5,448,660
- Number of Payouts: 639
- Winning Hand: A♥ 7♠

Final Table
Place	Name	Prize
1st	(United States) Long Ma (1/1)	$513,604
2nd	(United States) Giuliano Lentini	$317,352
3rd	(United States) Max Tavepholjalern	$231,766
4th	(United States) Alex Vazquez	$185,281
5th	(United States) Michael Eddy	$142,847
6th	(United States) Anthony Cass	$110,794
7th	(United States) Jugal Daterao	$86,462
8th	(United States) Derrick Stoebe	$67,886
9th	(United States) Adrian Buckley	$53,625

=== Event #5: $1,500 Omaha Hi-Lo 8 or Better ===
- 3-Day Event: October 1–3
- Number of Entries: 607
- Total Prize Pool: $910,500
- Number of Payouts: 92
- Winning Hand: 9♠ 6♠ 6♥ 5♠

Final Table
Place	Name	Prize
1st	(Canada) Connor Drinan (1/2)	$163,252
2nd	(United States) Travis Pearson	$100,901
3rd	(United States) Robert Mizrachi (0/4)	$71,602
4th	(United States) Sandy Sanchez	$51,590
5th	(United States) Micah Brooks	$37,750
6th	(United States) Carl Lijewski	$28,059
7th	(United States) Kris Kwiatkowski	$21,192
8th	(United States) Curtis Phelps	$16,266
9th	(United States) Michael Moed	$12,693

=== Event #6: $25,000 High Roller No-Limit Hold'em 8-Handed ===
- 3-Day Event: October 2–4
- Number of Entries: 135
- Total Prize Pool: $3,189,375
- Number of Payouts: 21
- Winning Hand: A♣ 2♣

Final Table
Place	Name	Prize
1st	(United States) Tyler Cornell (1/1)	$833,289
2nd	(United States) Michael Liang	$515,014
3rd	(Spain) Adrián Mateos (0/3)	$381,870
4th	(United States) Jonathan Jaffe	$286,202
5th	(Italy) Mustapha Kanit	$216,842
6th	(United States) Mohammad Arani	$166,102
7th	(United Kingdom) Paul Newey	$128,654
8th	(United States) Adam Hendrix	$100,773

=== Event #7: $1,500 Dealers Choice 6-Handed ===
- 3-Day Event: October 3–5
- Number of Entries: 307
- Total Prize Pool: $409,845
- Number of Payouts: 47
- Winning Hand: J♠ 10♣ 8♠ 3♣(Pot-Limit Omaha)

Final Table
Place	Name	Prize
1st	(Canada) Jaswinder Lally (1/1)	$97,915
2nd	(United States) Andrew Kelsall	$60,514
3rd	(United States) Ray Henson	$40,062
4th	(United States) Ian O'Hara	$27,147
5th	(United States) Adam Kipnis	$18,839
6th	(United States) Christopher Lindner	$13,396

=== Event #8: $600 No-Limit Hold'em Deepstack ===
- 2-Day Event: October 4–5
- Number of Entries: 4,527
- Total Prize Pool: $2,308,770
- Number of Payouts: 680
- Winning Hand: A♣ A♠

Final Table
Place	Name	Prize
1st	(United States) Zhi Wu (1/1)	$281,406
2nd	(United States) Ari Mezrich	$173,960
3rd	(Canada) Chrishan Sivasundaram	$131,646
4th	(United States) Ryan Chan	$100,308
5th	(United States) Nicholas Zautra	$76,957
6th	(United States) Alexander Tafesh	$59,453
7th	(United States) Amalim Onyia	$46,251
8th	(United States) Hannes Jeschka	$36,235
9th	(United States) Daniel Lowery	$28,589

=== Event #9: $10,000 Omaha Hi-Lo 8 or Better Championship ===
- 4-Day Event: October 4–7
- Number of Entries: 134
- Total Prize Pool: $1,249,550
- Number of Payouts: 21
- Winning Hand: A♠ 10♠ 4♠ 3♥

Final Table
Place	Name	Prize
1st	(United States) Ari Engel (1/2)	$317,076
2nd	(United States) Zachary Milchman	$195,968
3rd	(United States) Andrew Yeh	$143,988
4th	(United States) Eddie Blumenthal	$107,204
5th	(United States) Phil Hellmuth (0/15)	$80,894
6th	(United States) George Wolff	$61,877
7th	(United States) Robert Mizrachi (0/4)	$47,987
8th	(United States) Ben Landowski	$37,738
9th	(United States) Khamar Xaytavone	$30,102

=== Event #10: $1,000 Super Turbo Bounty No-Limit Hold'em ===
- 1-Day Event: October 5
- Number of Entries: 1,640
- Total Prize Pool: $1,459,600
- Number of Payouts: 246
- Winning Hand: Q♦ 9♣

Final Table
Place	Name	Prize
1st	(United States) Michael Perrone (1/1)	$152,173
2nd	(France) Pierre Calamusa	$94,060
3rd	(United States) Jeremiah Fitzpatrick	$69,454
4th	(United States) Scott Podolsky	$51,787
5th	(Canada) Paul Dhaliwal	$38,996
6th	(United States) John Moss	$29,657
7th	(United States) Paul Jain	$22,783
8th	(United States) Badr Imejjane	$17,680
9th	(United States) Gabe Ramos	$13,861

=== Event #11: $25,000 Heads-Up No-Limit Hold'em Championship ===
- 3-Day Event: October 5–7
- Number of Entries: 57
- Total Prize Pool: $1,346,625
- Number of Payouts: 8
- Winning Hand: J♠ 7♦

Final Table
Place	Name	Prize
1st	(United States) Jason Koon (1/1)	$243,981
2nd	(Hungary) Gabor Szabo	$150,790
SF	(Finland) Henri Puustinen	$89,787
SF	(United States) Daniel Zack (0/1)	$89,787
QF	(Belarus) Mikita Badziakouski	$36,820
QF	(United States) Bin Weng	$36,820
QF	(United States) Benjamin Reason	$36,820
QF	(United States) Jake Daniels	$36,820

=== Event #12: $1,500 Limit Hold'em ===
- 3-Day Event: October 5–7
- Number of Entries: 422
- Total Prize Pool: $563,370
- Number of Payouts: 64
- Winning Hand: A♦ K♦

Final Table
Place	Name	Prize
1st	(Israel) Yuval Bronshtein (1/2)	$124,374
2nd	(United States) Kevin Erickson	$76,868
3rd	(United States) Tom McCormick	$53,558
4th	(United States) John Bunch	$38,011
5th	(United States) Ian Glycenfer	$27,488
6th	(United States) Zachary Gruneberg	$20,262
7th	(United States) Guy Cicconi	$15,230
8th	(United States) Tony Nasr	$11,677
9th	(Canada) Anh Van Nguyen	$9,137

=== Event #13: $3,000 No-Limit Hold'em Freezeout ===
- 3-Day Event: October 6–8
- Number of Entries: 720
- Total Prize Pool: $1,922,400
- Number of Payouts: 108
- Winning Hand: K♥ 10♦

Final Table
Place	Name	Prize
1st	(United States) Harvey Mathews (1/1)	$371,914
2nd	(Ecuador) Gabriel Andrade	$229,848
3rd	(Belgium) Michael Gathy (0/4)	$164,083
4th	(United States) Girish Apte	$118,815
5th	(United States) Brandon Caputo	$87,288
6th	(United States) David Lolis	$65,072
7th	(United States) Craig Mason	$49,238
8th	(United States) Andrew Jeong	$37,824
9th	(United States) Frederic Heller	$29,504

=== Event #14: $1,500 Seven Card Stud ===
- 3-Day Event: October 6–8
- Number of Entries: 261
- Total Prize Pool: $348,435
- Number of Payouts: 39
- Winning Hand: K♥ 8♣ / K♦ J♥ J♣ 5♣ / J♠

Final Table
Place	Name	Prize
1st	(United States) Rafael Lebron (1/2)	$82,262
2nd	(United States) David Williams (0/1)	$50,842
3rd	(United States) David Moskowitz	$35,521
4th	(United States) Christina Hill	$25,344
5th	(United States) Shaun Deeb (0/4)	$18,475
6th	(United States) Nicholas Seiken (0/1)	$13,766
7th	(Italy) Maurizio Melara	$10,490
8th	(United States) Hal Rotholz	$8,179

=== Event #15: $1,500 No-Limit Hold'em 6-Handed ===
- 3-Day Event: October 7–9
- Number of Entries: 1,450
- Total Prize Pool: $1,935,750
- Number of Payouts: 218
- Winning Hand: A♥ 10♦

Final Table
Place	Name	Prize
1st	(United States) Bradley Jansen (0/1)	$313,403
2nd	(France) Jeremy Malod	$193,711
3rd	(United States) Ryan Pedigo	$136,070
4th	(United States) Sean Hegarty	$96,919
5th	(United States) Ryan Andrada	$70,013
6th	(United States) Jesse Yaginuma	$51,305

=== Event #16: $10,000 Limit Hold'em Championship ===
- 3-Day Event: October 7–9
- Number of Entries: 92
- Total Prize Pool: $857,900
- Number of Payouts: 14
- Winning Hand: K♣ 8♥

Final Table
Place	Name	Prize
1st	(United States) John Monnette (1/4)	$245,680
2nd	(United States) Nate Silver	$151,842
3rd	(United States) Eric Kurtzman	$108,747
4th	(Canada) Terrence Chan	$79,210
5th	(United States) Jason Somerville (0/1)	$58,697
6th	(United States) John Racener (0/1)	$44,263
7th	(United States) Scott Tuttle	$33,979
8th	(United States) Christopher Chung	$26,561
9th	(United States) Kevin Song (0/1)	$21,149

=== Event #17: $1,500 Millionaire Maker No-Limit Hold'em ===
- 5-Day Event: October 8–12
- Number of Entries: 2,568
- Total Prize Pool: $3,428,280
- Number of Payouts: 799
- Winning Hand: A♠ J♥

Final Table
Place	Name	Prize
1st	(United States) Daniel Lazrus (1/2)	$1,000,000
2nd	(United States) Darryl Ronconi	$500,125
3rd	(United States) Jeffrey Gencarelli	$377,125
4th	(Belgium) Michael Gathy (0/4)	$288,715
5th	(Mexico) Ignacio Moron	$222,430
6th	(United States) Kevin Palmer	$172,455
7th	(United States) Todd Saffron	$124,570
8th	(United States) Adam Sherman	$105,690
9th	(Turkey) Sertac Turker	$83,545

=== Event #18: $2,500 Mixed Triple Draw Lowball ===
- 3-Day Event: October 8–10
- Number of Entries: 253
- Total Prize Pool: $562,925
- Number of Payouts: 38
- Winning Hand: Jx 6x 5x 3x 2x (2-7 Triple Draw)

Final Table
Place	Name	Prize
1st	(United States) Vladimir Peck (1/1)	$134,390
2nd	(United States) Venkata Tayi	$83,056
3rd	(Portugal) João Vieira (0/1)	$57,558
4th	(United States) Aaron Rogers	$40,443
5th	(United States) Brian Yoon (0/3)	$28,818
6th	(United States) Hal Rotholz	$20,828

=== Event #19: $10,000 Seven Card Stud Championship ===
- 3-Day Event: October 9–11
- Number of Entries: 62
- Total Prize Pool: $578,150
- Number of Payouts: 10
- Winning Hand: J♦ 3♥ / A♥ 3♠ 10♣ 7♦ / 2♠

Final Table
Place	Name	Prize
1st	(United States) Anthony Zinno (1/3)	$182,872
2nd	(Taiwan) James Chen (0/1)	$113,024
3rd	(Bolivia) Jose Paz-Gutierrez	$77,227
4th	(United States) Phil Hellmuth (0/15)	$54,730
5th	(United States) Jack McClelland	$40,284
6th	(United Kingdom) Stephen Chidwick (0/1)	$30,842
7th	(United States) Jason Gola (0/1)	$24,601
8th	(United States) Scott Bohlman (0/1)	$20,480

=== Event #20: $1,000 Flip & Go No-Limit Hold'em ===
- 2-Day Event: October 10–11
- Number of Entries: 1,240
- Total Prize Pool: $1,103,600
- Number of Payouts: 155
- Winning Hand: A♣ J♥

Final Table
Place	Name	Prize
1st	(United States) DJ Alexander (1/1)	$180,665
2nd	(United States) Jason Beck	$111,715
3rd	(United States) Jake Schwartz	$82,675
4th	(United States) David Peters (0/3)	$61,815
5th	(United States) Huy Lam	$46,695
6th	(United States) Corey Bierria	$35,645
7th	(Slovenia) Rok Gostisa	$27,495
8th	(United States) Fred Goldberg (0/1)	$21,435
9th	(United States) Koveh Waysei	$16,895

=== Event #21: $1,500 Mixed Omaha Hi-Lo ===
- 3-Day Event: October 10–12
- Number of Entries: 641
- Total Prize Pool: $855,735
- Number of Payouts: 96
- Winning Hand: A♦ K♠ Q♦ 7♠ 3♠ (Big O)

Final Table
Place	Name	Prize
1st	(United States) Dylan Linde (1/1)	$170,269
2nd	(United States) Hernan Salazar	$105,235
3rd	(United States) Scott Abrams	$71,651
4th	(United States) David Matsumoto	$49,733
5th	(United States) Damjan Radanov	$35,204
6th	(United States) Ryan Roeder	$25,424
7th	(United States) Lance Sobelman	$18,740

=== Event #22: $10,000/$1,000 Ladies No-Limit Hold'em Championship ===
- 4-Day Event: October 11–14
- Number of Entries: 644
- Total Prize Pool: $573,160
- Number of Payouts: 97
- Winning Hand: K♥ Q♦

Final Table
Place	Name	Prize
1st	(United States) Lara Eisenberg (1/1)	$115,694
2nd	(United States) Debora Brooke	$71,507
3rd	(United States) Mikiyo Aoki	$50,525
4th	(United States) Diane Cooley	$36,269
5th	(United States) J.J. Liu	$26,458
6th	(United States) Qing Lu	$19,619
7th	(United States) Marle Cordeiro	$14,791
8th	(United States) Cherish Andrews	$11,341
9th	(United States) Tiffany Lee	$8,847

=== Event #23: $1,500 Eight Game Mix ===
- 3-Day Event: October 11–13
- Number of Entries: 484
- Total Prize Pool: $646,140
- Number of Payouts: 73
- Winning Hand: 7x 6x 5x 4x 2x (2-7 Triple Draw)

Final Table
Place	Name	Prize
1st	(United States) Ryan Leng (2/3)	$137,969
2nd	(Canada) Connor Drinan (1/2)	$85,273
3rd	(United States) Brett Shaffer (0/2)	$56,839
4th	(United States) Daniel Zack (0/1)	$38,752
5th	(United States) Schuyler Thornton	$27,038
6th	(United States) Ryan Hughes	$19,317

=== Event #24: $600 Pot-Limit Omaha Deepstack ===
- 2-Day Event: October 12–13
- Number of Entries: 1,572
- Total Prize Pool: $801,720
- Number of Payouts: 236
- Winning Hand: A♣ 6♠ 4♠ 4♥

Final Table
Place	Name	Prize
1st	(United States) Michael Prendergast (1/1)	$127,428
2nd	(United States) Jeffrey Barnes	$78,755
3rd	(Hong Kong) Jungwoong Park	$57,386
4th	(Brazil) João Simão (0/1)	$42,272
5th	(United States) Daniel Wasserberg	$31,485
6th	(United States) Donnie Phan	$23,713
7th	(United States) Eric Polirer	$18,062
8th	(United States) John Bunch	$13,915

=== Event #25: $5,000 No-Limit Hold'em 6-Handed ===
- 4-Day Event: October 12–15
- Number of Entries: 604
- Total Prize Pool: $2,666,025
- Number of Payouts: 91
- Winning Hand: A♦ 2♦

Final Table
Place	Name	Prize
1st	(United States) Scott Ball (1/1)	$562,667
2nd	(United States) Galen Hall (0/1)	$347,757
3rd	(United States) Jonathan Jaffe	$234,781
4th	(Taiwan) Eric Tsai	$161,756
5th	(United States) Bin Weng	$113,775
6th	(United States) John Racener (0/1)	$81,736

=== Event #26: $1,000 Freezeout No-Limit Hold'em ===
- 2-Day Event: October 13–14
- Number of Entries: 1,358
- Total Prize Pool: $1,208,620
- Number of Payouts: 204
- Winning Hand: K♦ 3♦

Final Table
Place	Name	Prize
1st	(Czech Republic) Dalibor Dula (1/1)	$199,227
2nd	(United States) Cole Ferraro	$123,142
3rd	(United States) Edward Welch	$89,875
4th	(United States) Guowei Zhang	$66,335
5th	(United States) Maxx Coleman	$49,519
6th	(United States) Anthony Askey	$37,393
7th	(United States) Nicolo Audannio	$28,565
8th	(United States) Levi Klump	$22,080
9th	(United States) Maurice Hawkins	$17,270

=== Event #27: $1,500 H.O.R.S.E. ===
- 3-Day Event: October 13–15
- Number of Entries: 594
- Total Prize Pool: $792,990
- Number of Payouts: 90
- Winning Hand: Ax 4x / 3x 6x Tx Jx / Tx (Razz)

Final Table
Place	Name	Prize
1st	(United States) Anthony Zinno (2/4)	$160,636
2nd	(United States) Randy Ohel (0/1)	$99,276
3rd	(United States) Christopher Adams	$69,585
4th	(United States) Kao Saechao	$49,597
5th	(Canada) Darren Kennedy	$35,957
6th	(United States) Paul Holder	$26,523
7th	(United States) Curtis Phelps	$19,911
8th	(Italy) Max Pescatori (0/4)	$15,218

=== Event #28: $1,000 Pot-Limit Omaha 8-Handed ===
- 3-Day Event: October 14–16
- Number of Entries: 1,069
- Total Prize Pool: $951,410
- Number of Payouts: 161
- Winning Hand: A♥ 7♥ 2♦ 2♣

Final Table
Place	Name	Prize
1st	(United States) Dylan Weisman (1/1)	$166,461
2nd	(United States) Craig Chait	$102,884
3rd	(United States) Alexander Yen	$74,239
4th	(Austria) Tim Van Loo	$54,230
5th	(Israel) Ran Niv	$40,109
6th	(United States) Chase Fujita	$30,040
7th	(India) Manan Bhandari	$22,787
8th	(United States) Youness Barakat	$17,510

=== Event #29: $10,000 Short Deck No-Limit Hold'em ===
- 3-Day Event: October 14–16
- Number of Entries: 66
- Total Prize Pool: $615,450
- Number of Payouts: 10
- Winning Hand: J♠ 8♣

Final Table
Place	Name	Prize
1st	(United States) Chance Kornuth (1/3)	$194,670
2nd	(United States) Chad Campbell	$120,316
3rd	(United States) Dan Shak	$82,678
4th	(Israel) Moshe Gabay	$58,601
5th	(Portugal) João Vieira (0/1)	$42,885
6th	(United States) Thomas Kysar	$32,437

=== Event #30: $1,500 Monster Stack No-Limit Hold'em ===
- 5-Day Event: October 15–19
- Number of Entries: 3,520
- Total Prize Pool: $4,699,200
- Number of Payouts: 528
- Winning Hand: Q♠ Q♥

Final Table
Place	Name	Prize
1st	Michael Noori (1/1)	$610,347
2nd	Ryan Leng (2/3)	$377,220
3rd	Rafael Reis	$288,101
4th	Christopher Andler	$221,289
5th	Charlie Dawson	$170,943
6th	Mordechai Hazan	$132,812
7th	Daniel Fortier	$103,784
8th	Johan Schumacher	$81,573
9th	Anthony Ortega	$64,490

=== Event #31: $1,500 No-Limit 2-7 Lowball Draw ===
- 3-Day Event: October 15–17
- Number of Entries: 272
- Total Prize Pool: $363,120
- Number of Payouts: 41
- Winning Hand: 9x 8x 7x 5x 2x

Final Table
Place	Name	Prize
1st	Phil Hellmuth (1/16)	$84,851
2nd	Jake Schwartz	$52,502
3rd	Chris Vitch (0/2)	$36,387
4th	Rep Porter (0/3)	$25,661
5th	Joshua Faris	$18,421
6th	Dario Sammartino	$13,463
7th	Jason Lipiner	$10,023

=== Event #32: $3,000 H.O.R.S.E. ===
- 3-Day Event: October 16–18
- Number of Entries: 282
- Total Prize Pool: $752,940
- Number of Payouts: 43
- Winning Hand: 8x 6x / 5x 8x 4x 5x / 2x (Razz)

Final Table
Place	Name	Prize
1st	Jim Collopy (1/2)	$172,823
2nd	Ahmed Mohamed	$107,428
3rd	Paramjit Gill	$74,346
4th	Eli Elezra (0/4)	$53,986
5th	Maria Ho	$39,423
6th	Michael Trivett	$29,436
7th	Qinghai Pan	$22,462
8th	Daniel Negreanu (0/6)	$17,526

=== Event #33: $800 No-Limit Hold'em Deepstack ===
- 3-Day Event: October 17–19
- Number of Entries: 2,778
- Total Prize Pool: $1,955,712
- Number of Payouts: 417
- Winning Hand: 5♦ 3♣

Final Table
Place	Name	Prize
1st	Ran Koller (1/1)	$269,478
2nd	Ran Ilani	$166,552
3rd	Florian Guimond	$124,671
4th	Oleg Titov	$94,028
5th	Kris Steinbach	$71,457
6th	Alex Outhred	$54,722
7th	Jorge Hou	$42,231
8th	Donald Maloney	$32,845

=== Event #34: $1,500 Limit 2-7 Lowball Triple Draw ===
- 3-Day Event: October 17–19
- Number of Entries: 284
- Total Prize Pool: $380,475
- Number of Payouts: 43
- Winning Hand: 8x 6x 5x 4x 2x

Final Table
Place	Name	Prize
1st	David "Bakes" Baker (1/3)	$87,837
2nd	Peter Lynn	$54,286
3rd	Stephen Deutsch	$37,194
4th	Kristijonas Andrulis	$25,971
5th	Marc Booth	$18,488
6th	Mark Fraser	$13,423

=== Event #35: $500 Freezeout No-Limit Hold'em ===
- 2-Day Event: October 18–19
- Number of Entries: 2,930
- Total Prize Pool: $1,231,020
- Number of Payouts: 440
- Winning Hand: Q♣ Q♠

Final Table
Place	Name	Prize
1st	Anthony Koutsos (1/1)	$167,272
2nd	Charbel Kanterjian	$103,403
3rd	Dongsheng Zhang	$77,600
4th	Jonah Lopas	$58,685
5th	Sundiata DeVore	$44,725
6th	Jacob Rich	$34,353
7th	Ronald Ibbetson	$26,595
8th	John Moss	$20,753
9th	Fausto Valdez	$16,324

=== Event #36: $10,000 Dealers Choice 6-Handed Championship ===
- 3-Day Event: October 18–20
- Number of Entries: 93
- Total Prize Pool: $867,225
- Number of Payouts: 14
- Winning Hand: 9♥ 6♠ 5♣ 2♦ (Badugi)

Final Table
Place	Name	Prize
1st	Adam Friedman (1/4)	$248,350
2nd	Phil Hellmuth (1/16)	$153,493
3rd	Jake Schwartz	$107,861
4th	Carol Fuchs (0/1)	$77,437
5th	Mike Matusow (0/4)	$56,826
6th	Andrew Kelsall (0/1)	$42,646

=== Event #37: $1,500 Super Turbo Bounty No Limit Hold'em ===
- 1-Day Event: October 19
- Number of Entries: 1,441
- Total Prize Pool: $1,923,735
- Number of Payouts: 217
- Winning Hand: A♣ 9♠

Final Table
Place	Name	Prize
1st	Karolis Sereika (1/1)	$195,310
2nd	Pedro Padilha	$120,700
3rd	Lorenzo Adams	$88,435
4th	Pierre Calamusa	$65,494
5th	Steve Buell	$49,033
6th	Alec Gould	$37,114
7th	Romuald Pycior	$28,406
8th	Alexander Norden	$21,986
9th	Wing Yam	$17,211

=== Event #38: $50,000 High Roller No-Limit Hold'em 8-Handed ===
- 3-Day Event: October 19–21
- Number of Entries: 81
- Total Prize Pool: $3,877,875
- Number of Payouts: 13
- Winning Hand: K♥ J♥

Final Table
Place	Name	Prize
1st	Michael Addamo (1/3)	$1,132,968
2nd	Justin Bonomo (0/3)	$700,228
3rd	Gal Yifrach (0/1)	$495,305
4th	Erik Seidel (1/9)	$358,665
5th	Chris Hunichen	$266,031
6th	Bin Weng	$202,236
7th	Sam Soverel (0/1)	$157,666
8th	Mustapha Kanit	$126,141

=== Event #39: $1,500 Pot-Limit Omaha 8-Handed ===
- 3-Day Event: October 20–22
- Number of Entries: 821
- Total Prize Pool: $1,096,035
- Number of Payouts: 124
- Winning Hand: A♣ A♠ 10♦ 2♥

Final Table
Place	Name	Prize
1st	Josh Arieh (1/3)	$204,766
2nd	Tommy Le (0/1)	$126,549
3rd	Robert Blair	$89,968
4th	Ivan Deyra (0/1)	$64,890
5th	Gabriel Andrade	$47,492
6th	Nitiesh Rawtani	$35,278
7th	Lior Abudi	$26,603
8th	Charles Wilt	$20,371

=== Event #40: $10,000 H.O.R.S.E. Championship ===
- 4-Day Event: October 20–23
- Number of Entries: 149
- Total Prize Pool: $1,389,425
- Number of Payouts: 23
- Winning Hand: 9♠ 6♠ 4♥ 3♣ (Omaha Hi-Lo)

Final Table
Place	Name	Prize
1st	Kevin Gerhart (1/3)	$361,124
2nd	Marco Johnson (0/2)	$223,194
3rd	Eddie Blumenthal	$155,971
4th	Bryce Yockey (0/1)	$111,701
5th	Brandon Shack-Harris (0/2)	$82,033
6th	Chris Vitch (0/2)	$61,819
7th	Jake Schwartz	$47,835
8th	David Benyamine (0/1)	$38,035

=== Event #41: $2,500 Freezeout No-Limit Hold'em ===
- 3-Day Event: October 21–23
- Number of Entries: 896
- Total Prize Pool: $1,993,600
- Number of Payouts: 135
- Winning Hand: 10♣ 7♣

Final Table
Place	Name	Prize
1st	Carlos Chang (1/1)	$364,589
2nd	Brady Osterman	$225,333
3rd	Adrien Delmas	$161,731
4th	Sergi Reixach	$117,650
5th	Arthur Conan (0/1)	$86,757
6th	Sung Joo Hyun	$64,864
7th	Gerald Cunniff	$49,179
8th	Quang Ngo	$37,820
9th	Christopher Basile	$29,506

=== Event #42: $1,500 Razz ===
- 3-Day Event: October 21–23
- Number of Entries: 311
- Total Prize Pool: $415,185
- Number of Payouts: 47
- Winning Hand: 8x 5x / Qx 9x 3x 6x / 5x

Final Table
Place	Name	Prize
1st	Bradley Ruben (2/3)	$99,188
2nd	Charles Sinn	$61,303
3rd	Matt Grapenthien (0/1)	$41,758
4th	Yuri Dzivielevski (0/2)	$29,089
5th	David "ODB" Baker (0/2)	$20,732
6th	Brett Feldman	$15,127
7th	Alex Livingston	$11,305
8th	Hassan Kamoei	$8,658

=== Event #43: $1,000 Double Stack No-Limit Hold'em ===
- 5-Day Event: October 22–26
- Number of Entries: 3,991
- Total Prize Pool: $3,551,990
- Number of Payouts: 599
- Winning Hand: 10♦ 10♣

Final Table
Place	Name	Prize
1st	Anthony Denove (1/1)	$446,983
2nd	David Guay	$276,269
3rd	Timothy Little	$210,004
4th	Jeff Platt	$160,662
5th	Frank Lagodich	$123,710
6th	Steve Stolzenfeld	$95,878
7th	Kenneth Inouye	$74,796
8th	Joshua Harrison	$58,735
9th	Michael Wang (0/1)	$46,430

=== Event #44: $3,000 Limit Hold'em 6-Handed ===
- 3-Day Event: October 22–24
- Number of Entries: 162
- Total Prize Pool: $432,540
- Number of Payouts: 25
- Winning Hand: K♦ 5♣

Final Table
Place	Name	Prize
1st	Ryan Hansen (1/1)	$109,692
2nd	Kosei Ichinose	$67,796
3rd	Kevin Erickson	$46,669
4th	Ken Deng	$32,864
5th	Kenny Hsiung	$23,688
6th	Steve Chanthabouasy	$17,486

=== Event #45: $10,000 Pot-Limit Omaha 8-Handed Championship ===
- 4-Day Event: October 23–26
- Number of Entries: 344
- Total Prize Pool: $3,207,800
- Number of Payouts: 52
- Winning Hand: 9♥ 6♠ 5♦ 2♦

Final Table
Place	Name	Prize
1st	Tommy Le (1/2)	$746,477
2nd	Jordan Spurlin	$461,360
3rd	Chris Sandrock	$324,800
4th	Artem Maksimov	$242,236
5th	Jeremy Ausmus (1/2)	$168,689
6th	Eli Elezra (0/4)	$124,508
7th	Arthur Morris	$93,406
8th	Ashly Butler	$71,242

=== Event #46: $800 No-Limit Hold'em Deepstack ===
- 2-Day Event: October 24–25
- Number of Entries: 2,053
- Total Prize Pool: $1,445,312
- Number of Payouts: 308
- Winning Hand: A♠ 8♦

Final Table
Place	Name	Prize
1st	Chad Norton (1/1)	$214,830
2nd	Steve Lemma	$132,802
3rd	Andres Jeckeln	$98,269
4th	Narimaan Ahmadi	$73,371
5th	Ivan Uzunov	$55,279
6th	Kevin Wang	$42,031
7th	Jordyn Miller	$32,254
8th	William Blais	$24,982

=== Event #47: $5,000 Freezeout No-Limit Hold'em 8-Handed ===
- 3-Day Event: October 24–26
- Number of Entries: 421
- Total Prize Pool: $1,941,863
- Number of Payouts: 64
- Winning Hand: K♠ 8♦

Final Table
Place	Name	Prize
1st	Alexandre Reard (1/1)	$428,694
2nd	Daniel Strelitz (0/1)	$264,953
3rd	Ren Lin	$186,803
4th	Conrad Simpson	$133,733
5th	Qing Liu	$97,238
6th	Darren Grant	$71,827
7th	Diogo Veiga (0/1)	$53,913
8th	Jamie Sequeira	$41,132

=== Event #48: $1,500 Shootout No-Limit Hold'em ===
- 3-Day Event: October 25–27
- Number of Entries: 800
- Total Prize Pool: $1,068,000
- Number of Payouts: 80
- Winning Hand: Q♣ 4♠

Final Table
Place	Name	Prize
1st	Gershon Distenfeld (1/1)	$204,063
2nd	Johan Schumacher	$126,133
3rd	Jonathan Betancur	$94,270
4th	Orson Young	$71,142
5th	David Tran	$54,217
6th	Sohale Khalili	$41,728
7th	Ari Engel (1/2)	$32,439
8th	Thomas Boivin	$25,473
9th	"Ap" Lou Garza	$20,208
10th	Craig Trost	$16,197

=== Event #49: $10,000 No-Limit 2-7 Lowball Draw Championship ===
- 3-Day Event: October 25–27
- Number of Entries: 122
- Total Prize Pool: $1,137,000
- Number of Payouts: 19
- Winning Hand: 9x 8x 7x 5x 4x

Final Table
Place	Name	Prize
1st	Farzad Bonyadi (1/4)	$297,051
2nd	Johannes Becker (0/1)	$183,591
3rd	Benny Glaser (0/3)	$132,685
4th	Dustin Dirksen	$97,199
5th	Jake Schwartz	$72,185
6th	Julien Martini (0/1)	$54,359
7th	Benjamin Diebold	$41,515

=== Event #50: $600 Mixed No-Limit Hold'em/Pot-Limit Omaha Deepstack 8-Handed ===
- 2-Day Event: October 26–27
- Number of Entries: 1,569
- Total Prize Pool: $800,190
- Number of Payouts: 236
- Winning Hand: Q♣ 9♠ 6♣ 4♦

Final Table
Place	Name	Prize
1st	Darrin Wright (1/1)	$127,219
2nd	Victor Paredes	$78,604
3rd	Joshua Ray	$57,276
4th	Colten Yamagishi	$42,192
5th	Hanan Braun	$31,425
6th	Ryan Colton	$23,668
7th	John Gilchrist	$18,028
8th	Kyle Mclean	$13,889

=== Event #51: $3,000 No-Limit Hold'em 6-Handed ===
- 2-Day Event: October 26–27
- Number of Entries: 997
- Total Prize Pool: $2,661,990
- Number of Payouts: 150
- Winning Hand: K♠ 10♦

Final Table
Place	Name	Prize
1st	Brian Rast (1/5)	$474,102
2nd	John Gallaher	$293,009
3rd	Tuan Phan	$210,913
4th	Nick Yunis	$141,478
5th	Jun Obara	$100,827
6th	Francisco Benitez	$73,107

=== Event #52: $1,000 Seniors No-Limit Hold'em Championship ===
- 4-Day Event: October 27-November 1
- Number of Entries: 5,404
- Total Prize Pool: $4,809,560
- Number of Payouts: 811
- Winning Hand: Q♣ 9♣

Final Table
Place	Name	Prize
1st	Robert McMillan (1/1)	$561,060
2nd	Robert Davis	$346,743
3rd	Daniel Stebbin	$263,640
4th	Jonathan Ingalls	$201,753
5th	Christopher Cummings	$155,401
6th	Dennis Jensen	$120,484
7th	Louis Cheffy	$94,030
8th	Todd Hansen	$73,873
9th	Daniel Lujano	$58,425

=== Event #53: $25,000 High Roller Pot-Limit Omaha ===
- 4-Day Event: October 27–30
- Number of Entries: 212
- Total Prize Pool: $5,008,500
- Number of Payouts: 32
- Winning Hand: A♣ 7♦ 6♥ 5♠

Final Table
Place	Name	Prize
1st	Shaun Deeb (1/5)	$1,251,860
2nd	Ka Kwan Lau	$773,708
3rd	John Beauprez (0/1)	$537,295
4th	Maxx Coleman	$381,394
5th	Veselin Karakitukov	$276,870
6th	David Benyamine (0/1)	$205,655
7th	Ben Lamb (0/1)	$156,387
8th	Charles Sinn	$121,816

=== Event #54: $2,500 Nine Game Mix 6-Handed ===
- 3-Day Event: October 28–31
- Number of Entries: 319
- Total Prize Pool: $709,775
- Number of Payouts: 48
- Winning Hand: 6x 2x / Ax 4x 8x 7x / Ax (Razz)

Final Table
Place	Name	Prize
1st	Nicholas Julia (1/1)	$168,608
2nd	Kristan Lord	$104,210
3rd	Justin Liberto (0/1)	$69,341
4th	Aditya Prasetyo	$47,164
5th	Robert McLaughlin	$32,808
6th	Robert Mizrachi (0/4)	$23,352

=== Event #55: $400 Colossus No-Limit Hold'em ===
- 4-Day Event: October 29-November 1
- Number of Entries: 9,399
- Total Prize Pool: $3,101,670
- Number of Payouts: 1,391
- Winning Hand: 5♥ 2♥

Final Table
Place	Name	Prize
1st	Anatolii Zyrin (1/2)	$314,705
2nd	Michael Lee	$194,450
3rd	Kevin Rand	$147,595
4th	Phuoc Nguyen	$112,730
5th	David Ripley	$86,650
6th	Eric Kim	$67,025
7th	Martin Gavasci	$52,180
8th	Vincas Tamasauskas	$40,885
9th	Penh Lo	$32,240

=== Event #56: $10,000 No-Limit Hold'em 6-Handed Championship ===
- 3-Day Event: October 29–31
- Number of Entries: 329
- Total Prize Pool: $3,067,925
- Number of Payouts: 50
- Winning Hand: J♠ J♥

Final Table
Place	Name	Prize
1st	Ben Yu (1/4)	$721,453
2nd	Nikita Kuznetsov	$445,892
3rd	Ariel Mantel	$293,578
4th	Mike Sowers	$198,205
5th	Steve Yea	$137,303
6th	Asi Moshe (0/4)	$97,660

=== Event #57: $10,000 Limit 2-7 Lowball Triple Draw Championship ===
- 3-Day Event: October 30-November 1
- Number of Entries: 80
- Total Prize Pool: $746,000
- Number of Payouts: 14
- Winning Hand: Tx 8x 7x 6x 3x

Final Table
Place	Name	Prize
1st	Brian Yoon (1/4)	$240,341
2nd	Danny Wong	$148,341
3rd	Wil Wilkinson	$104,381
4th	Don Nguyen	$74,939
5th	Joao Vieira (0/1)	$54,993
6th	Brandon Shack-Harris (0/2)	$41,270

=== Event #58: $1,000 Super Seniors No-Limit Hold'em ===
- 4-Day Event: October 31-November 3
- Number of Entries: 1,893
- Total Prize Pool: $1,684,770
- Number of Payouts: 284
- Winning Hand: J♠ 7♦

Final Table
Place	Name	Prize
1st	Jean-Luc Adam (1/1)	$255,623
2nd	Eugene Salomon	$157,986
3rd	Scott Sukstorf	$117,181
4th	Bill Stabler	$87,722
5th	Alex Katsman	$66,284
6th	Joseph Richards	$50,559
7th	Girish Apte	$38,932
8th	Reginald Powell	$30,269
9th	Gary Pagel	$23,762

=== Event #59: $1,000 Tag Team No-Limit Hold'em ===
- 3-Day Event: October 31-November 2
- Number of Entries: 641
- Total Prize Pool: $285,245
- Number of Payouts: 97
- Winning Hand: Q♦ 7♣

Final Table
Place	Name	Prize
1st	Mike Ruter (1/1) Samy Dighlawi (1/1)	$113,366
2nd	Tomer Wolf David Landell	$70,074
3rd	Amanda Botfeld David Botfeld	$49,512
4th	Michael Newman Robert Ormont	$35,542
5th	Alfie Adam Vidur Sethi	$25,928
6th	Benjamin Miner Dmitriy Uskach	$19,226
7th	Holly Babbitt Michael Babbitt	$14,494
8th	Zachary Erdwurm Steven Jones	$11,114
9th	Scott Johnston Bob Fisher	$8,670

=== Event #60: $50,000 Poker Players Championship ===
- 5-Day Event: October 31-November 4
- Number of Entries: 63
- Total Prize Pool: $3,016,125
- Number of Payouts: 10
- Winning Hand: Q♣ 3♦ (Limit Hold'em)

Final Table
Place	Name	Prize
1st	Dan Cates (1/1)	$954,020
2nd	Ryan Leng (2/3)	$589,628
3rd	Paul Volpe (0/3)	$404,243
4th	Eli Elezra (0/4)	$286,983
5th	Chris Brewer	$211,235
6th	Josh Arieh (1/3)	$161,422

=== Event #61: $600 Deepstack Championship No-Limit Hold'em ===
- 3-Day Event: November 1–3
- Number of Entries: 3,916
- Total Prize Pool: $1,997,160
- Number of Payouts: 588
- Winning Hand: 10♦ 10♣

Final Table
Place	Name	Prize
1st	Cole Ferraro (1/1)	$252,492
2nd	Sami Rustom	$156,056
3rd	Sean Dunleavy	$117,822
4th	Bart Lybaert	$89,587
5th	Richard Dixon	$68,604
6th	Edgardo Rosario	$52,914
7th	Xiangdong Huang	$41,108
8th	Rubin Chappell	$32,169
9th	Ronald Slucker	$25,359

=== Event #62: $1,500 Pot-Limit Omaha Hi-Lo 8 or Better ===
- 3-Day Event: November 1–3
- Number of Entries: 725
- Total Prize Pool: $967,875
- Number of Payouts: 109
- Winning Hand: K♥ 10♦ 10♣ 8♥

Final Table
Place	Name	Prize
1st	Kevin Gerhart (2/4)	$186,789
2nd	Dustin Dirksen	$115,440
3rd	Matthew Kaplan	$81,696
4th	Sterling Lopez	$58,695
5th	Alexandr Orlov	$42,823
6th	Roman Hrabec	$31,733
7th	Michael Trivett	$23,891
8th	Dylan Wilkerson	$18,278

=== Event #63: $500 Salute to Warriors No-Limit Hold'em ===
- 3-Day Event: November 2–4
- Number of Entries: 1,738
- Total Prize Pool: $782,100
- Number of Payouts: 261
- Winning Hand: K♦ J♣

Final Table
Place	Name	Prize
1st	Eric Zhang (1/1)	$102,465
2nd	Guy Hadas	$63,344
3rd	Bradley Rogoff	$47,125
4th	Chulhan Choi	$35,406
5th	Mitch Garshofsky	$26,866
6th	Marty Zabib	$20,592
7th	Hlib Kovtunov	$15,943
8th	Christopher Corbo	$12,471
9th	Anthony Mccurdy	$9,857

=== Event #64: $5,000 Mixed No-Limit Hold'em/Pot-Limit Omaha ===
- 2-Day Event: November 2–3
- Number of Entries: 579
- Total Prize Pool: $2,670,638
- Number of Payouts: 87
- Winning Hand: A♠ 6♦ 6♥ 5♠

Final Table
Place	Name	Prize
1st	Eelis Parssinen (1/1)	$545,616
2nd	Noah Bronstein	$337,216
3rd	Ezra Abu Gazal	$239,321
4th	David Prociak	$172,332
5th	Joni Jouhkimainen	$125,940
6th	Kyle Arora	$93,425
7th	Niklas Astedt	$70,367
8th	Vikranth Anga	$53,824

=== Event #65: $1,000 Mini Main Event No-Limit Hold'em ===
- 3-Day Event: November 3–5
- Number of Entries: 3,821
- Total Prize Pool: $3,400,690
- Number of Payouts: 574
- Winning Hand: 3♦ 2♦

Final Table
Place	Name	Prize
1st	Georgios Sotiropoulos (1/3)	$432,575
2nd	Wataru Miyashita	$267,328
3rd	Jordan Meltzer	$202,695
4th	James Patterson	$154,720
5th	James Rubinski	$118,898
6th	Matthew Jewett	$91,991
7th	David Tuthill	$71,661
8th	James Morgan	$56,208
9th	Erkut Yilmaz	$44,394

=== Event #66: $10,000 Pot-Limit Omaha Hi-Lo 8 or Better Championship ===
- 4-Day Event: November 3–6
- Number of Entries: 194
- Total Prize Pool: $1,809,050
- Number of Payouts: 32
- Winning Hand: Q♠ 6♠ 5♦ 4♦

Final Table
Place	Name	Prize
1st	Josh Arieh (2/4)	$484,791
2nd	Danny Chang	$299,627
3rd	Anatolii Zyrin (1/2)	$207,369
4th	Dan Colpoys	$146,817
5th	Jeff Gross	$106,391
6th	Adam Owen	$78,955
7th	Aaron Kupin	$60,040
8th	Matt Woodward	$46,813

=== Event #67: $10,000 No-Limit Hold'em Main Event ===
- 9-Day Event: November 4–19
- Number of Entries: 6,650
- Total Prize Pool: $62,011,250
- Number of Payouts: 1,000
- Winning Hand: 10♦ 7♦

Final Table
Place	Name	Prize
1st	Koray Aldemir (1/1)	$8,000,000
2nd	George Holmes	$4,300,000
3rd	Jack Oliver	$3,000,000
4th	Joshua Remitio	$2,300,000
5th	Ozgur Secilmis	$1,800,000
6th	Hye Park	$1,400,000
7th	Alejandro Lococo	$1,225,000
8th	Jareth East	$1,100,000
9th	Chase Bianchi	$1,000,000

=== Event #68: $1,111 Little One for One Drop No-Limit Hold'em ===
- 5-Day Event: November 8–12
- Number of Entries: 3,797
- Total Prize Pool: $3,800,797
- Number of Payouts: 570
- Winning Hand: Q♣ Q♠

Final Table
Place	Name	Prize
1st	Scott Ball (2/2)	$396,445
2nd	Michael Shanhan	$245,068
3rd	Sorel Mizzi	$186,824
4th	Sebastian Medina	$143,399
5th	David Jackson (0/1)	$110,827
6th	Ronnie Ballantyne	$86,249
7th	Petro Zakusilov	$67,592
8th	Seth Fischer (0/1)	$53,343
9th	Frank Marasco	$42,389

=== Event #69: $1,500 Seven Card Stud Hi-Lo 8 or Better ===
- 3-Day Event: November 10–12
- Number of Entries: 372
- Total Prize Pool: $496,620
- Number of Payouts: 56
- Winning Hand: 2♦ 3♣ 4♥ / 8♥ 6♠ 10♣ 5♦

Final Table
Place	Name	Prize
1st	Jermaine Reid (1/1)	$113,459
2nd	Peder Berge	$70,126
3rd	John Hoang	$48,138
4th	John Monnette (1/4)	$33,734
5th	Esther Taylor	$24,145
6th	Carol Fuchs (0/1)	$17,658
7th	Espen Sandvik (0/1)	$13,202
8th	John Racener (0/1)	$10,085

=== Event #70: $888 Crazy Eights No-Limit Hold'em ===
- 6-Day Event: November 11–16
- Number of Entries: 5,262
- Total Prize Pool: $4,150,761
- Number of Payouts: 735
- Winning Hand: A♦ 8♠

Final Table
Place	Name	Prize
1st	David Moses (1/1)	$888,888
2nd	Sejin Park (0/1)	$400,888
3rd	Timo Kamphues	$200,888
4th	Paul Fehlig	$134,888
5th	Leonid Yanovski	$102,888
6th	Georgios Sotiropoulos (1/3)	$79,888
7th	Joseph Liberta	$61,888
8th	Farhad Davoudzadeh	$47,888

=== Event #71: $1,500 Bounty Pot-Limit Omaha 8-Handed ===
- 3-Day Event: November 11–13
- Number of Entries: 860
- Total Prize Pool: $1,148,100
- Number of Payouts: 129
- Winning Hand: Q♦ 6♥ 4♣ 3♥

Final Table
Place	Name	Prize
1st	Mourad Amokrane (1/1)	$132,844
2nd	Matt Mamiya	$82,100
3rd	Matthew Humphrey	$58,733
4th	Matthew Mlsna	$42,604
5th	Dustin Nelson	$31,344
6th	Paulo Villena	$23,392
7th	Jeff Gross	$17,712
8th	Kao Saechao	$13,610

=== Event #72: $1,500 Mixed No-Limit Hold'em/Pot-Limit Omaha ===
- 3-Day Event: November 12–14
- Number of Entries: 846
- Total Prize Pool: $1,129,410
- Number of Payouts: 127
- Winning Hand: Q♥ 10♦ 8♠ 5♣ (Pot-Limit Omaha)

Final Table
Place	Name	Prize
1st	Motoyoshi Okamura (1/1)	$209,716
2nd	Rafael Mota	$129,621
3rd	Nick Yunis	$91,989
4th	Leonid Yanovski	$66,249
5th	Mike Takayama (0/1)	$48,428
6th	Jordan Spurlin	$35,942
7th	Marc Lange	$27,088
8th	Tim Grau	$20,737

=== Event #73: $10,000 Seven Card Stud Hi-Lo 8 or Better Championship ===
- 3-Day Event: November 13–15
- Number of Entries: 144
- Total Prize Pool: $1,342,800
- Number of Payouts: 22
- Winning Hand: 9♠ 2♠ / 6♥ 4♠ 3♠ 10♠ / 10♥

Final Table
Place	Name	Prize
1st	Brian Hastings (1/5)	$352,958
2nd	Ian O'Hara	$218,144
3rd	Yuval Bronshtein (1/2)	$151,460
4th	Scott Seiver (0/3)	$107,967
5th	Marco Johnson (0/2)	$79,073
6th	John Monnette (1/4)	$59,545
7th	Erik Seidel (0/9)	$46,140
8th	Gary Benson (0/1)	$36,821

=== Event #74: $2,500 Mixed Big Bet Event ===
- 3-Day Event: November 14–16
- Number of Entries: 212
- Total Prize Pool: $471,700
- Number of Payouts: 32
- Winning Hand: A♣ Q♥ 8♠ 6♠ (Pot-Limit Omaha 8-or-Better)

Final Table
Place	Name	Prize
1st	Denis Strebkov (1/2)	$117,898
2nd	Jerry Wong	$72,868
3rd	Pearce Arnold	$48,864
4th	Richard Bai	$33,583
5th	Shanmukha Meruga	$23,670
6th	Patrik Ciklamini	$17,119

=== Event #75: $1,500 Freezeout No-Limit Hold'em ===
- 3-Day Event: November 15–17
- Number of Entries: 1,191
- Total Prize Pool: $1,589,985
- Number of Payouts: 177
- Winning Hand: 8♣ 8♦

Final Table
Place	Name	Prize
1st	Chad Himmelspach (1/1)	$270,877
2nd	Stefan Reiser	$167,418
3rd	Renmei Liu	$121,580
4th	Kaue De Souza	$89,344
5th	Ori Hasson	$66,447
6th	Tarun Gulati	$50,021
7th	Nicholas Hubers	$38,121
8th	Seth Evans	$29,416
9th	Louison Vincent	$22,986

=== Event #76: $10,000 Super Turbo Bounty No-Limit Hold'em ===
- 2-Day Event: November 15–16
- Number of Entries: 307
- Total Prize Pool: $2,862,775
- Number of Payouts: 47
- Winning Hand: 10♥ 9♥

Final Table
Place	Name	Prize
1st	Romain Lewis (1/1)	$463,885
2nd	Aditya Agarwal	$286,705
3rd	Stephen Chidwick (0/1)	$200,598
4th	Uri Reichenstein	$142,840
5th	Barth Melius	$103,547
6th	Dario Sammartino	$76,442
7th	Yevgeniy Timoshenko	$57,489
8th	Haribhai Gopaul	$44,060
9th	Rainer Kempe	$34,424

=== Event #77: $1,500 Fifty Stack No-Limit Hold'em ===
- 2-Day Event: November 16–17
- Number of Entries: 1,501
- Total Prize Pool: $2,003,835
- Number of Payouts: 226
- Winning Hand: K♣ K♦

Final Table
Place	Name	Prize
1st	Paulo Joanello (1/1)	$321,917
2nd	Toby Price	$198,970
3rd	Martin Bicanik	$146,061
4th	Ron Moisescu	$108,349
5th	Roongsak Griffeth	$81,228
6th	Axel Hallay	$61,550
7th	Elio Fox (0/2)	$47,145
8th	David Morel	$36,508
9th	Scott Hall	$28,585

=== Event #78: $10,000 Razz Championship ===
- 3-Day Event: November 16–18
- Number of Entries: 109
- Total Prize Pool: $1,016,425
- Number of Payouts: 17
- Winning Hand: Ax 4x / 5x 2x Tx Kx / Jx

Final Table
Place	Name	Prize
1st	Benny Glaser (1/4)	$274,693
2nd	Everett Carlton	$169,773
3rd	Yuri Dzivielevski (0/2)	$123,254
4th	Erik Sagstrom	$90,859
5th	John Monnette (1/4)	$68,025
6th	Yehuda Buchalter	$51,739
7th	Erik Seidel (0/9)	$39,987
8th	Phil Hellmuth (1/16)	$31,411

=== Event #79: $1,979 Poker Hall of Fame Bounty No-Limit Hold'em ===
- 3-Day Event: November 17–19
- Number of Entries: 468
- Total Prize Pool: $826,050
- Number of Payouts: 71
- Winning Hand: A♦ 5♠

Final Table
Place	Name	Prize
1st	Ole Schemion (1/1)	$172,499
2nd	Benjamin Underwood	$106,618
3rd	Giovani Torre	$74,175
4th	Marc Rivera	$52,569
5th	James Alexander	$37,965
6th	Jerry Wong	$27,951
7th	Ronald Sullivan	$20,985
8th	Dylan Wilkerson	$16,074
9th	Eder Murata	$12,565

=== Event #80: $3,000 Pot-Limit Omaha 6-Handed ===
- 4-Day Event: November 17–20
- Number of Entries: 496
- Total Prize Pool: $1,324,320
- Number of Payouts: 74
- Winning Hand: K♥ Q♠ J♥ 10♣

Final Table
Place	Name	Prize
1st	Robert Cowen (1/1)	$280,916
2nd	Robert Emmerson	$173,613
3rd	Uri Reichenstein	$116,106
4th	Dylan Weisman (0/1)	$79,368
5th	William Benson	$55,485
6th	Karel Mokry	$39,688

=== Event #81: $800 No Limit Hold'em Deepstack ===
- 2-Day Event: November 18–19
- Number of Entries: 1,921
- Total Prize Pool: $1,352,384
- Number of Payouts: 289
- Winning Hand: A♣ A♠

Final Table
Place	Name	Prize
1st	Jason Wheeler (1/1)	$204,274
2nd	Julian Velasquez	$126,252
3rd	Diogo Veiga	$93,627
4th	Garry Gates	$70,077
5th	Antoine Goutard	$52,943
6th	SheLok Wong	$40,376
7th	Ralph Massey	$31,087
8th	John O'Neal	$24,165
9th	Robert Hill	$18,968

=== Event #82: $250,000 Super High Roller No-Limit Hold'em ===
- 3-Day Event: November 18–20
- Number of Entries: 33
- Total Prize Pool: $8,217,000
- Number of Payouts: 5
- Winning Hand: Q♠ 10♣

Final Table
Place	Name	Prize
1st	Adrian Mateos (1/4)	$3,265,362
2nd	Benjamin Heath (0/1)	$2,018,148
3rd	John Kincaid	$1,370,575
4th	Seth Davies	$930,791
5th	Keith Tilston (0/1)	$632,124
6th	Christoph Vogelsang	
7th	David Peters (0/3)	
8th	Stephen Chidwick (0/1)	

=== Event #83: $1,500 The Closer No-Limit Hold'em ===
- 3-Day Event: November 19–21
- Number of Entries: 1,903
- Total Prize Pool: $2,540,505
- Number of Payouts: 274
- Winning Hand: Q♠ 5♠

Final Table
Place	Name	Prize
1st	Leo Margets (1/1)	$376,850
2nd	Alex Kulev	$232,920
3rd	Stephen Song (0/1)	$172,855
4th	Marc Lange	$129,460
5th	Arturo Segura	$97,865
6th	Cherish Andrews	$74,680
7th	Aleksandr Shevliakov	$57,525
8th	Chris Moorman (0/2)	$44,740
9th	Benjamin Underwood	$35,131

=== Event #84: $50,000 High Roller Pot-Limit Omaha ===
- 2-Day Event: November 19–20
- Number of Entries: 85
- Total Prize Pool: $4,069,375
- Number of Payouts: 13
- Winning Hand: A♦ 8♥ 5♥ 2♥

Final Table
Place	Name	Prize
1st	Jeremy Ausmus (2/3)	$1,188,918
2nd	Phil Hellmuth (1/16)	$734,807
3rd	Daniel Negreanu (0/6)	$519,764
4th	Alexander Petersen (0/1)	$376,376
5th	Laszlo Bujtas	$279,168
6th	Jared Bleznick	$212,223
7th	Josh Arieh (2/4)	$165,452
8th	Ben Lamb (0/1)	$132,370
9th	Veselin Karakitukov	$108,753

=== Event #85: $50,000 High Roller No-Limit Hold'em ===
- 3-Day Event: November 20–22
- Number of Entries: 113
- Total Prize Pool: $5,409,875
- Number of Payouts: 17
- Winning Hand: A♠ 5♥

Final Table
Place	Name	Prize
1st	Mikita Badziakouski (1/1)	$1,462,043
2nd	Ren Lin	$903,610
3rd	Daniel Negreanu (0/6)	$661,041
4th	Jason Koon (1/1)	$489,585
5th	Stephen Chidwick (0/1)	$367,153
6th	Ali Imsirovic	$278,840
7th	Carlos Chadha-Villamarin	$214,496
8th	Joao Vieira (0/1)	$167,153
9th	Ryan Leng (2/3)	$131,982

=== Event #86: $1,000 Super Turbo No Limit Hold'em ===
- 1-Day Event: November 21
- Number of Entries: 1,025
- Total Prize Pool: $912,250
- Number of Payouts: 154
- Winning Hand: K♦ J♥

Final Table
Place	Name	Prize
1st	Michael McCauley (1/1)	$161,384
2nd	Andrew Wilson	$99,742
3rd	Neel Joshi	$72,031
4th	Yuval Bronshtein (1/2)	$52,679
5th	Rajvir Dua	$39,022
6th	Filippo Ragone	$29,282
7th	Luigi Curcio	$22,263
8th	Marc Lomeo	$17,153
9th	Dara O'Kearney	$13,395

=== Event #87: $100,000 High Roller No-Limit Hold'em ===
- 3-Day Event: November 21–23
- Number of Entries: 64
- Total Prize Pool: $6,192,000
- Number of Payouts: 10
- Winning Hand: K♣ 2♠

Final Table
Place	Name	Prize
1st	Michael Addamo (2/4)	$1,958,569
2nd	Kevin Rabichow	$1,210,487
3rd	Sam Soverel (0/1)	$830,992
4th	Sean Perry	$590,344
5th	Henrik Hecklen	$434,523
6th	Sorel Mizzi	$331,806
7th	Sam Grafton	$263,227
8th	Mikita Badziakouski (1/1)	$217,274

=== Event #88: $5,000 No-Limit Hold'em 8-Handed ===
- 2-Day Event: November 22–23
- Number of Entries: 531
- Total Prize Pool: $2,449,238
- Number of Payouts: 80
- Winning Hand: J♣ 6♣

Final Table
Place	Name	Prize
1st	Boris Kolev (1/1)	$511,184
2nd	Uri Reichenstein	$315,936
3rd	Huy Nguyen	$222,310
4th	Ramon Colillas	$158,972
5th	Z Stein	$115,558
6th	Niko Koop	$85,411
7th	George Wolff	$64,207
8th	Lee Markholt	$49,107
