= 2024 World Series of Poker Online =

Series of online poker tournaments

- Location: Online (WSOP.com and GGPoker)
- Dates: August 18 - TBC

Champion
- (Germany) Moritz Dietrich

The 2024 World Series of Poker Online was the fifth annual series of online poker tournaments organized by the World Series of Poker (WSOP).

== GGPoker schedule ==
Played from August 18 to September 30, 2024.

#	Event	Entrants	Winner	Prize	Runner-up
1	$500 5th Annual WSOP Kick-off Bounty	3,369	(Malaysia) William Teoh (1/1)	$74,467+bounties	(Italy) Pietro Corsi
2	$300 No-Limit Hold'em Gladiators of Poker	11,630	(Latvia) Ritvars Cekalins (1/1)	$409,886	(Bulgaria) Ognyan Dimov (0/2)
3	$2,100 No-Limit Hold'em Bounty Championship	798	(United States) Bryn Kenney (1/2)	$94,635+bounties	(Ukraine) Andrii Derzhypilskyi (0/1)
4	$840 Bounty Pot-Limit Omaha	881	(India) Tarun Goyal (1/1)	$44,979+bounties	(China) Ren Lin
5	$500 Ladies No-Limit Hold'em Championship	186	(Brazil) Rosana Aguiar (1/1)	$16,512	(Vietnam) Dinh Khanh Quynh Tran
6	$1,500 Monster Stack No Limit Hold’em	1,437	(United States) Eric Kindred (1/1)	$263,719	(Mexico) Alejandro Quezada
7	$215 No-Limit Hold'em Mystery Millions Bounty	52,452	(Romania) Vlad Darie (1/1)	$623,719+bounties	(Ukraine) Michail Marakhovsky
8	$2,500 Turbo No-Limit Hold'em Championship	623	(Serbia) Igor Dyldin (1/1)	$219,233	(South Korea) Daewoong Song
9	$320 Bounty No-Limit Hold'em	3,610	(Portugal) Acacio Bispo (1/1)	$51,467+bounties	(Japan) Seiichi Kanemitsu
10	$1,000 5-Card Pot-Limit Omaha	709	(Greece) Ourania Zarkantzia (1/2)	$103,675	(Germany) Oliver Weis
11	$100 Flip & Go No-Limit Hold'em	7,346	(Canada) Michael Khan (1/1)	$165,549	(China) Hanwen Tao
12	$500 Mini Main Event No-Limit Hold'em	9,220	(Germany) Konstantin Held (1/1)	$574,199	(China) Chuan Feng
13	$5,000 6-Handed No-Limit Hold'em Championship	478	(France) Ivan Deyra (1/2)	$381,367	(Belarus) Ilia Arkhipov
14	$500 The Big 500 Bounty No-Limit Hold'em	2,784	(Bulgaria) Krum Polihronov (1/1)	$63,244+bounties	(Israel) Omry Pfau
15	$800 Ultra Deepstack No-Limit Hold'em	1,635	(Italy) Simone Andrian (1/2)	$156,230	(Germany) Tim Nikolas Kramer
16	$215 Beat the Pros Bounty No-Limit Hold'em	7,708	(Poland) Grzegorz Gosk (1/1)	$65,218+bounties	(Belgium) Kristof Segers
17	$1,500 Millionaire Maker No-Limit Hold'em	4,934	(Germany) Dennis Völz (1/1)	$1,287,143	(Brazil) José Eduardo Ferreira
18	$5,000 Short Deck Championship 3-Stack No-Limit Hold'em	92	(Germany) Oliver Weis (1/1)	$113,950	(Poland) Thomas Mikucinski
19	$777 Lucky Sevens Bountry 7-Handed No-Limit Hold'em	2,116	(Lithuania) Marius Kudzmanas (1/2)	$87,216+bounties	(Brazil) Emanuel Oliveira
20	$1,000 Double Chance 2-Stack No-Limit Hold'em	1,288	(Brazil) Eder Campana (1/1)	$160,051	(Sweden) Mathias Joelsson
21	$1,500 WSOP GGMasters High Roller Freezeout No-Limit Hold'em	1,408	(Vietnam) Manh Tuan Nguyen (1/1)	$325,546	(Russia) Alexey Badulin
22	$400 Colossus No-Limit Hold'em	1,352	(Russia) Igor Zemtsov (1/1)	$630,836	(Hong Kong) Jayden Cheung
23	$400 Plossus Pot-Limit Omaha Bounty	350	(Japan) Jetomo Sarah Batillem (1/1)	$64,244+bounties	(Israel) Uri Melzer
24	$10,000 Pot-Limit Omaha Championship	157	(Israel) Amit Ben Yacov (1/2)	$317,941	(Germany) Dominik Nitsche (0/4)
25	$525 Superstack Turbo Bounty No-Limit Hold'em	2,911	(Russia) Vitaliy Pankov (1/1)	$72,336+bounties	(Georgia (country)) Lazare Kalebashvili
26	$10,000 Heads Up No-Limit Hold'em Championship	128	(China) Wenjie Huang (1/1)	$366,892	(Morocco) Mehdi Chaoui
27	$1,050 Mystery Bounty Pot-Limit Omaha	1,069	(Israel) Roei Hertz (1/1)	$81,026+bounties	(Israel) Gabi Livshitz (0/1)
28	$5,000 WSOP Online Main Event	6,146	(Germany) Moritz Dietrich (1/1)	$4,021,012	(Russia) Evgenii Akimov
29	$25,000 GGMillion$ Super High Roller Championship	230	~~(Italy) Francesco Garofalo~~ (disqualified)	~~$1,122,201~~	(United States) Chris Brewer (0/2)
30	$2,100 6-handed Bounty No-Limit Hold'em	1,230	(Sweden) Simon Eric Mattsson (1/2)	$148,225+bounties	(Vietnam) Phuong Ngoc Nguyen
31	$5,000 Pot-Limit Omaha High Roller	280	(Portugal) Rui Ferreira (1/1)	$245,483	(Finland) Eelis Parssinen (0/1)
32	$1,500 Closer No-Limit Hold'em Turbo	2,159	(New Zealand) Paul Hong (1/1)	$163,680+bounties	(Germany) Dennis Völz (1/1)
33	$10,300 WSOP Online GGMillion$ No-Limit Hold'em	1,433	(Spain) Sergio Aido (2/2)	$1,935,575	(Serbia) Jovan Kenjic

=== Main Event ===
The Main Event attracted 6,146 players - a record for the WSOP Online Main Event.

Final table
Name	Number of chips (percentage of total)	WSOP Bracelets	WSOP Cashes*	WSOP Earnings*
(Mexico) Evgenii Akimov	86,397,825 (23.5%)	0	68	$407,367
(Portugal) Rui Ferreira	67,273,329 (18.3%)	1	58	$1,009,692
(Austria) Moritz Dietrich	56,664,080 (15.4%)	0	31	$269,620
(Belarus) Ilya Anatski	42,924,572 (11.7%)	0	58	$372,814
(Mexico) Isaac Baron	33,772,518 (9.2%)	1	36	$1,801,831
(China) Hai Pan	30,139,026 (8.2%)	0	9	$69,200
(Lithuania) Audrius Stakelis	19,731,250 (5.4%)	0	4	$5,041
(Portugal) Diogo Coelho	16,904,370 (4.6%)	0	25	$60,954
(Germany) Benjamin Rolle	14,328,220 (3.9%)	0	17	$110,854

*Career statistics prior to the Main Event - (WSOP Earnings database)

Final table results
Place	Name	Prize
1st	(Austria) Moritz Dietrich	$4,082,245.79
2nd	(Mexico) Evgenii Akimov	$3,147,103.09
3rd	(Portugal) Rui Ferreira	$2,426,820.62
4th	(Mexico) Isaac Baron	$1,871,408.44
5th	(Portugal) Diogo Coelho	$1,443,125.20
6th	(Belarus) Ilya Anatski	$1,112,873.73
7th	(China) Hai Pan	$858,215.91
8th	(Germany) Benjamin Rolle	$661,848.75
9th	(Lithuania) Audrius Stakelis	$502,771.00

=== GGPoker Canada (Ontario) ===
Played from August 19 to September 30, 2024. HENDOM LINK

#	Event	Entrants	Winner	Prize	Runner-up
1	C$300 No-Limit Hold'em Gladiators of Poker	1,035	(Venezuela) Andres Ojeda (1/1)	C$49,839	(Canada) Duc Tue-Eric Duong
2	C$210 No-Limit Hold'em Mystery Millions	1,711	(Canada) Tamer Alkamli (1/1)	C$30,896	(United States) John Pratt
3	C$100 Mini Main Event No-Limit Hold'em	2,555	(Canada) Aaron Marissen (1/1)	C$36,519	(Canada) Dawn Tollett
4	C$1,500 Monster Stack No Limit Hold’em	205	(Canada) Avery Grande (1/1)	C$54,418	(Canada) Jonathan Newman
5	C$400 Plossus Pot-Limit Omaha Bounty	554	(Canada) Matwej Troitschanski (1/1)	C$14,680+bounties	(Armenia) Massis Mooses Moghaddam
6	C$400 Colossus No-Limit Hold'em	939	(Canada) Sebastian Amaya (1/1)	C$61,414	(Canada) Nicholas Teeuwen
7	C$1,000 Ontario Main Event	730	(Canada) Jonathan Newman (1/1)	C$123,897	(India) Abhishek Paul
8	C$525 Closer No-Limit Hold'em Bounty	687	(Canada) Michael Farrow (1/1)	C$22,790+bounties	(Canada) Rocco Smeriglio

== WSOP.com schedule ==
Played from September 29 to November 12, 2024. HENDOM LINK

#	Event	Entrants	Winner	Prize	Runner-up
1	$500 No-Limit Hold'em Deepstack	714	(United States) Paul Scaturro (1/1)	$52,468	(United States) Jeremiah Williams (0/2)
2	$1,000 No-Limit Hold'em Mystery Bounty	513	(United States) Sandeep Mathai (1/1)	$43,250	(United States) Jonathan Dokler (0/1)
3	$777 No-Limit Hold'em Lucky 7s	423	(United States) Tyler Hirschfeld (1/1)	$54,157	(United States) Tony Dunst (1/3)
4	$400 No-Limit Hold'em	695	(United States) Joshua Remitio (2/2)	$40,858	(United States) Brett Halladay
5	$600 No-Limit Hold'em 6-Max	503	(United States) Anthony Huntsman (1/1)	$46,991	(United States) David Funkhouser (1/1)
6	$500 No-Limit Hold'em Ultra Deepstack	717	(United States) Dylan Linde (1/2)	$60,336	(United States) David Funkhouser (1/1)
7	$2,000 No-Limit Hold'em BIG PKO Bounty	162	(United States) Dave Alfa (1/1)	$28,786+bounties	(United States) Brent Roberts
8	$3,200 No-Limit Hold'em High Roller 6-Max	170	(United States) Dylan DeStefano (1/1)	$110,925	(United States) Chris Hunichen (1/1)
9	$500 No-Limit Hold'em Pot-Limit Omaha 6-Max	363	(United States) Matthew Davis (1/1)	$31,445	(United States) William Meeks
10	$600 No-Limit Hold'em Monsterstack	534	(United States) Scott Eskenazi (1/1)	$54,500	(United States) Ben Yu (0/4)
11	$500 No-Limit Hold'em Mystery Bounty	545	(United States) Gerald Morrell (1/2)	$35,643	(United States) Ryan McAllister
12	$888 No-Limit Hold'em Fall Crazy 8s	468	(Russia) Maria Konnikova (1/1)	$68,478	(United States) Jared Parker
13	$5,300 No-Limit Hold'em High Roller		cancelled due to lack of entries into the satellites		
14	$500 No-Limit Hold'em Freezeout	348	(United States) Jason Obinger (1/1)	$30,146	(United States) Michael Holtz (0/1)
15	$500 No-Limit Hold'em PKO	426	(United States) Kevin Ruscitti (1/1)	$15,125+bounties	(United States) Cherish Andrews (0/1)
16	$1,000 No-Limit Hold'em	422	(United States) Daniel Cosner (1/1)	$74,969	(United States) Ryan Andrada
17	$500 Pot-Limit Omaha Mystery Bounty 6-Max	466	(United States) Alex Foxen (1/2)	$20,064	(United States) Dan Smith (0/1)
18	$333 No-Limit Hold'em Triple 3s Tip Off	780	(United States) Jacob Kolbicz (1/1)	$43,758	(United States) Mark Roland
19	$1,000 No-Limit Hold'em 6-Max	311	(Canada) Kristen Foxen (1/5)	$56,703	(United States) Young Sik Eum
20	$400 No-Limit Hold'em Pot-Limit Omaha PKO 6-Max	444	(Georgia (country)) Roland Israelashvili (1/1)	$12,612+bounties	(United States) Assani Fisher
21	$600 No-Limit Hold'em Deepstack Championship	533	(United States) Brian Gates (1/1)	$59,275	(United States) Simon Levy
22	$888 No-Limit Hold'em Fall Crazy 8s	320	(United States) Brandon Zuidema (1/1)	$58,520	(Russia) Sergei Kislinskii
23	$666 No-Limit Hold'em Spooky Monsterstack	320	(United States) Jesse Yaginuma (1/3)	$59,396	(United States) David Funkhouser (1/1)
24	$1,000 No-Limit Hold'em 6-Max	373		$	(Lithuania) Aneris Adomkevicius (1/1)
25	$500 No-Limit Hold'em	514	(United States) Jamin Stokes (1/1)	$43,716	(United States) Gerald Morrell (1/2)
26	$3,200 No-Limit Hold'em High Roller Championship	126	(United States) Gun Dunlap (1/4)	$92,610	(United States) Aram Zobian (0/1)
27	$250 No-Limit Hold'em Mystery Bounty	1,943	(United States) Michele Lawson (1/1)	$41,567	(United States) Anthony Chin
28	$1,000 No-Limit Hold'em Pot-Limit Omaha 6-Max Championship	243	(United States) Chris George (1/1)	$46,009	(China) Yueqi Zhu (0/1)
29	$400 No-Limit Hold'em Turbo	500	(Canada) Ari Engel (1/4)	$34,200	(United States) Dan Stavila
30	$1,000 No-Limit Hold'em Deepstack	321	(United States) Michael Dwyer (1/1)	$57,776	(United States) Stanislav Barshak (0/1)
31	$400 No-Limit Hold'em Mystery Bounty	950	(United States) Michael Bohmerwald (1/1)	$35,520	(United States) Evan Avery
32	$1,000 No-Limit Hold'em Online Championship	362	(United States) Richard Alati (1/1)	$65,156	(United States) Michael Setera
33	$500 No-Limit Hold'em Fall Saver	572	(United States) Anthony Zinno (1/5)	$48,649	(United States) Tony Dunst (1/3)

=== WSOP.com Pennsylvania ===
Played from October 20 to November 10, 2024. HENDOM LINK

#	Event	Entrants	Winner	Prize	Runner-up
1	$500 No-Limit Hold'em Mystery Bounty	240	(United States) Kyle Lorenz (2/3)	$11,931	(United States) Zachary Gruneberg (0/1)
2	$500 Pot-Limit Omaha 6-Max	160	(United States) Joseph Ray (1/1)	$14,648	(United States) Michael Mcnicholas (0/1)
3	$500 No-Limit Hold'em PKO	240	(United States) Michael Lech (1/2)	$7,605	(United States) Blake Vogdes
4	$500 No-Limit Hold'em Championship	152	(United States) Casey Hatmaker (1/1)	$15,335	(United States) Joseph Michishima
