= Tony Dunst =

American poker player (born 1984)

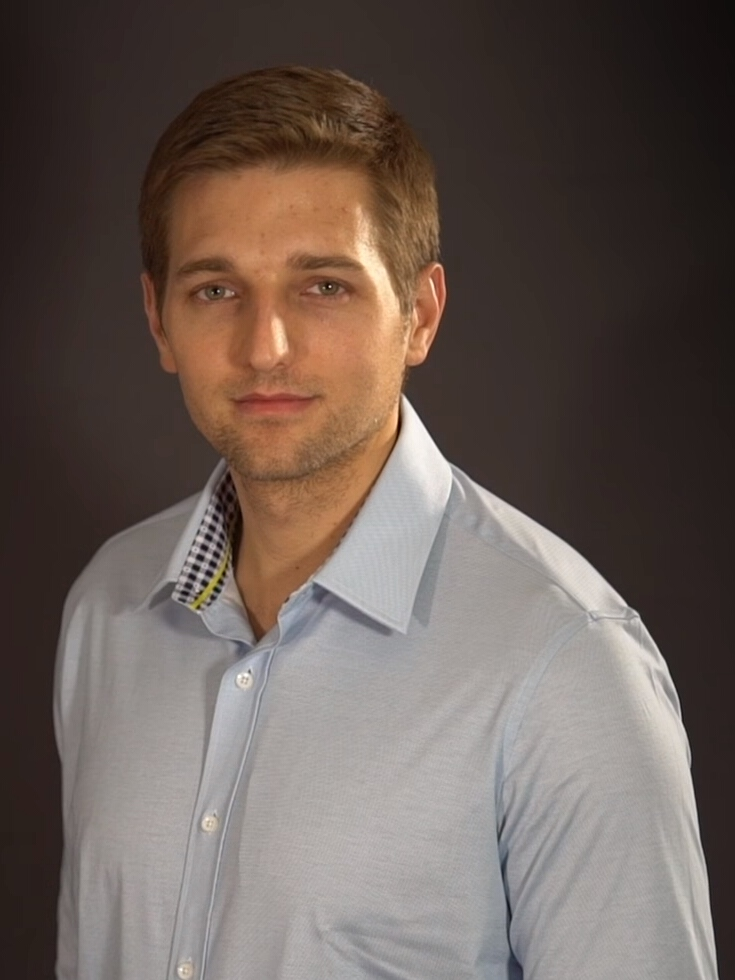
- Dunst in 2018
- Nickname: bond18
- Born: October 17, 1984 (age 42); Milwaukee, Wisconsin, U.S.

World Series of Poker
- Bracelets: 3
- Final tables: 5
- Money finishes: 40
- Highest WSOP Main Event finish: 50th, 2010

World Poker Tour
- Title: 1
- Final tables: 6
- Money finishes: 14
- World Series of Poker Circuit
- Circuit rings: 3
- Final tables: 23

George Tony Dunst (born October 17, 1984) is an American professional poker player, a three-time World Series of Poker (WSOP) bracelet winner, and a three-time World Series of Poker Circuit (WSOPC) ring winner.

== Poker career ==
Dunst was born in Milwaukee, Wisconsin, graduated Vel Phillips Memorial High School (then called James Madison Memorial) in Madison, Wisconsin, and studied theater at the University of Wisconsin-Milwaukee. He worked as a waiter before turning to poker and spent time living in Australia, China, and Malaysia before settling in Las Vegas, Nevada. He began playing online poker in 2003 after watching the 2002 WSOP on television. Playing under the name 'Bond18,' he has amassed more than $1.8 million in online tournament winnings.

Dunst first played in the WSOP in 2006, finishing in 198th place in the Main Event. His first bracelet came in 2016, when he defeated a field of 2,452 players in a $1,000 No Limit Hold'em event and earned $339,000. He dedicated his bracelet to his wife Sharon. He won his second bracelet in July 2020 at the WSOP Online in a $777 No Limit Hold'em 6-Handed event. Dunst won his third bracelet at the 2024 WSOP in the $500 No-Limit Hold'em Deepstack online event. Overall, Dunst has $1.2 million in career WSOP earnings.

His biggest live tournament cash came at the Aussie Millions Main Event in January 2016. Dunst nearly didn't play the tournament after losing a $5,000 chip while waiting in line to register, but fellow poker player Mike McDonald offered to pay his buy-in for him. Dunst eventually finished runner-up in the tournament to Ari Engel, earning A$1,000,000 ($700,000 US).

== World Poker Tour ==
In 2010, Dunst became host of the Raw Deal segment on World Poker Tour broadcasts, offering analysis of hands played at each final table. He won the season 12 WPT Caribbean event in November 2013. Dunst has made a further five WPT final tables, including three times in the WPT Championship, finishing runner-up to Ole Schemion in 2019. Dunst replaced Mike Sexton as WPT commentator alongside Vince Van Patten in 2017, after Sexton retired to become the chairman of partypoker.

As of 2026, Dunst has more than $4.3 million in live tournament winnings.

== World Series of Poker bracelets ==
Year	Tournament	Prize (US$)
2016	$1,000 No Limit Hold'em	$339,254
2020O	$777 No Limit Hold'em 6-Handed	$168,342
2024O	$500 No Limit Hold'em - Deepstack	$134,888

An "O" following a year denotes bracelet(s) won during the World Series of Poker Online

== World Series of Poker Circuit rings ==
Year	Tournament	Prize (US$)
2021O	$320 No Limit Hold'em - 6-Max	$19,757
2022O	$1,000 No Limit Hold'em - High Roller - 6-Max	$32,668
2022O	$320 No Limit Hold'em ONLINE	$21,230

An "O" following a year denotes bracelet(s) won during the World Series of Poker Circuit Online
