= 2021 World Series of Poker =

Series of poker tournaments

- Location: Rio All-Suite Hotel and Casino, Las Vegas, Nevada
- Dates: September 30 – November 23

Champion
- (Germany) Koray Aldemir

The 2021 World Series of Poker (WSOP) was the 52nd edition of the event. It took place from September 30 – November 23 at the Rio All-Suite Hotel and Casino in Las Vegas, Nevada.

A full schedule of 88 live events (plus 11 online events) was held after the 2020 WSOP was canceled due to the COVID-19 pandemic. The $10,000 No Limit Hold'em Main Event began on November 4, with the champion being determined on November 17.

New events included a $1,000 Flip and Go No Limit Hold'em Tournament, where each player was automatically all-in on the first hand and the winners of the hand will proceed into the money and a traditional tournament structure. There was also a Poker Hall of Famers Bounty tournament. Each member of the Poker Hall of Fame was invited to play as a freeroll and had a bounty placed on them, with the buy-in for other players $1,979 in honor of the Hall of Fame opening in 1979.

The WSOP also held another version of the World Series of Poker Online, which was first held in 2020, beginning on July 1.

== Event schedule ==
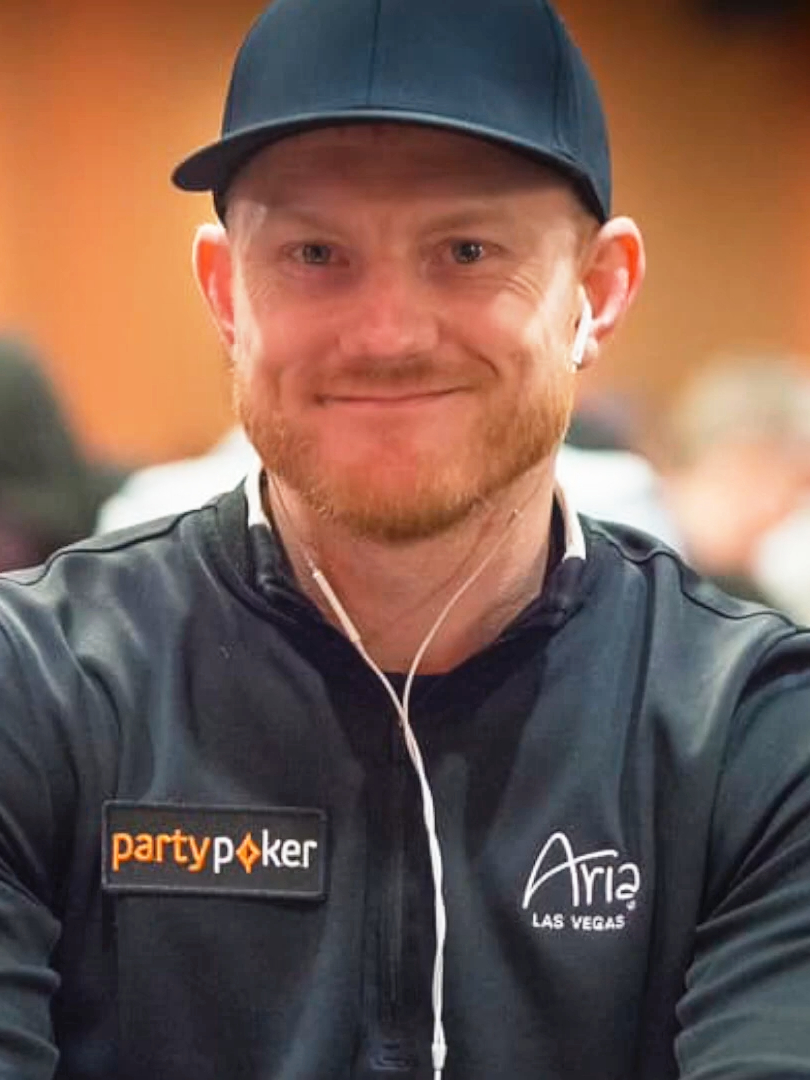
Jason Koon won his first bracelet in Event #11

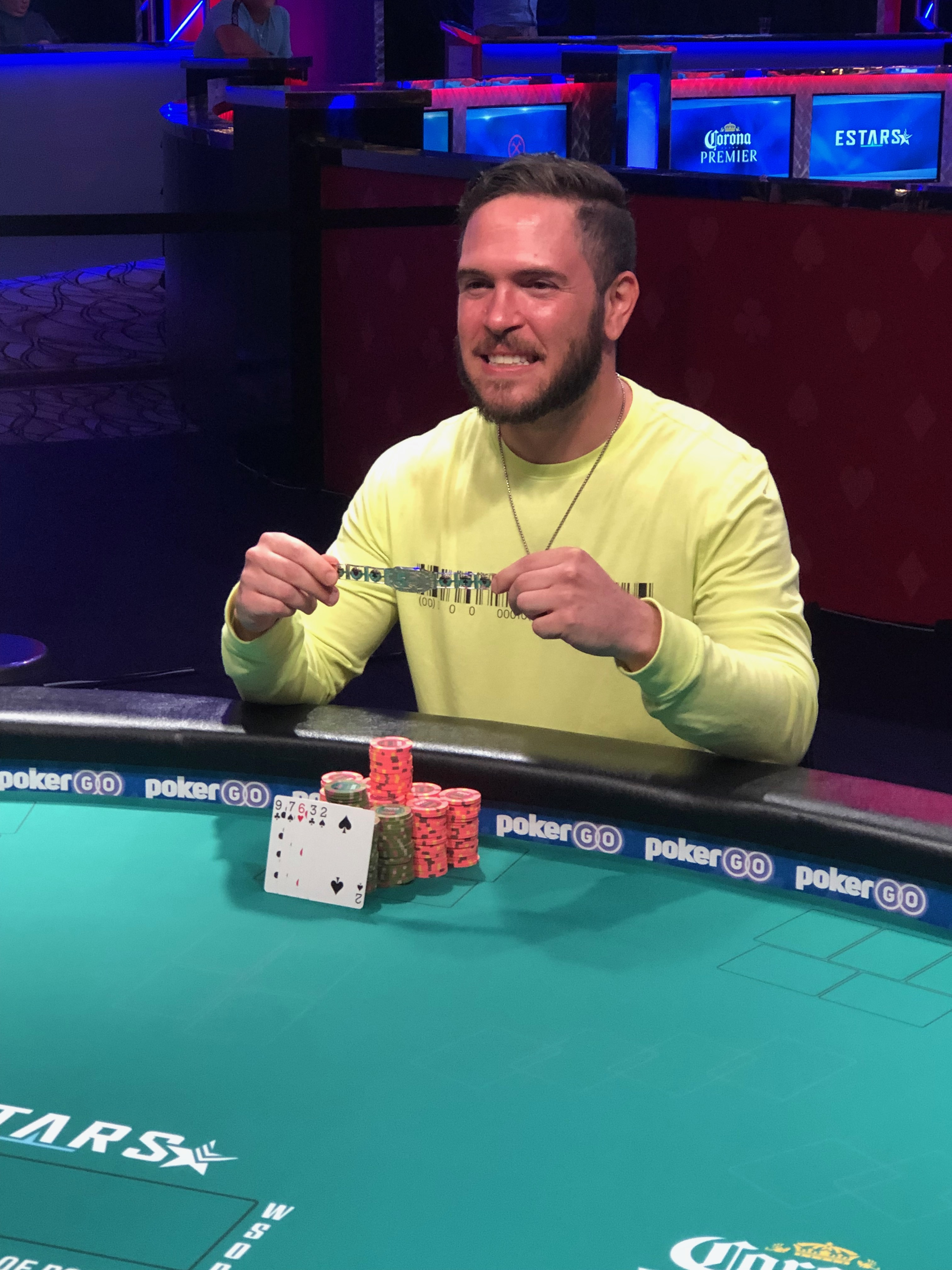
Yuval Bronshtein won his second bracelet in Event #12

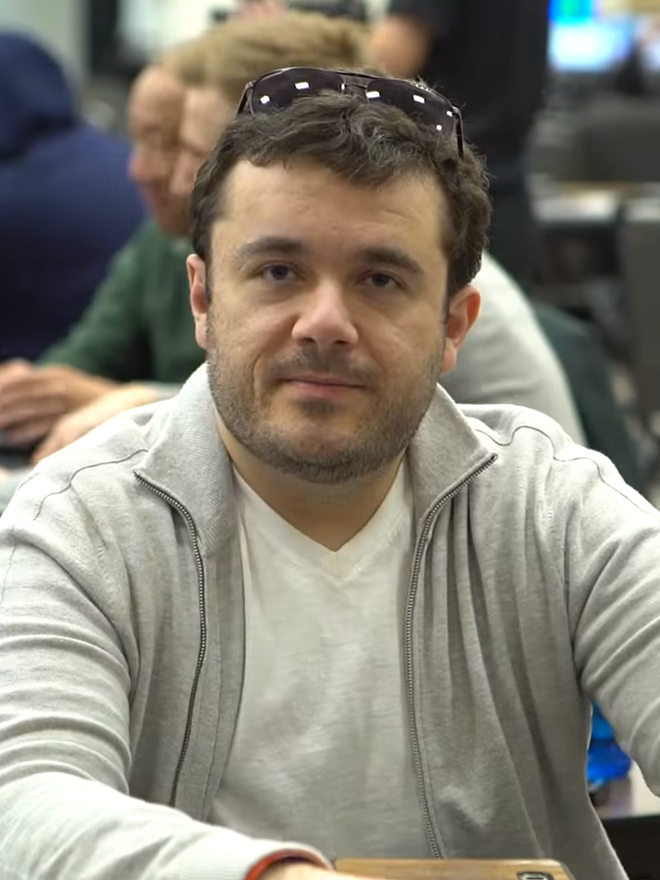
Anthony Zinno won his third and fourth bracelets in Events #19 and #27

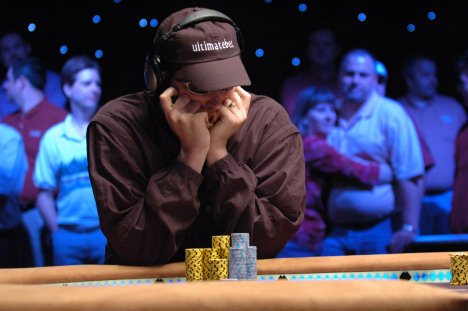
Phil Hellmuth won his 16th bracelet in Event #31

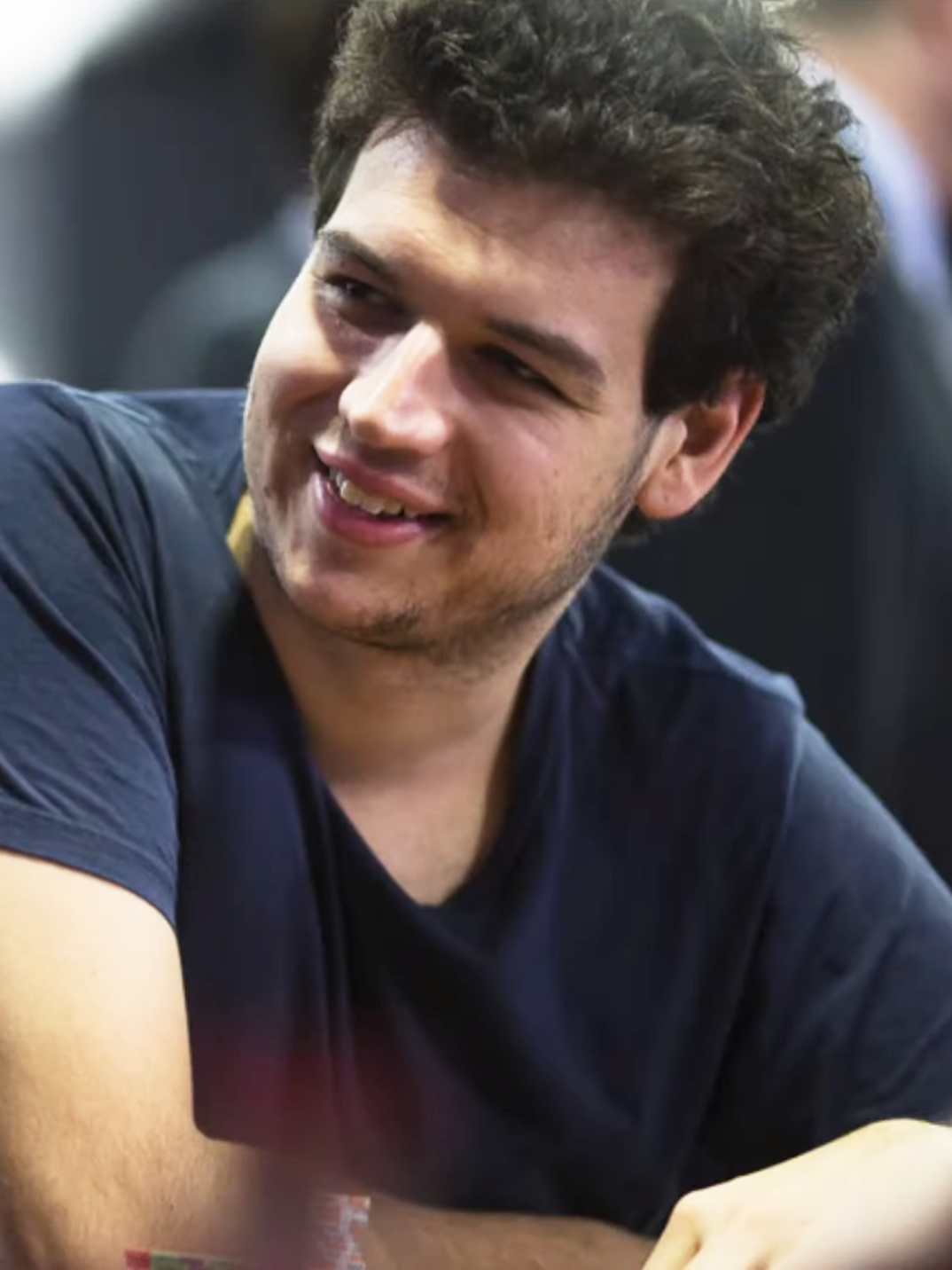
Michael Addamo won his third and fourth bracelet in Events #38 and #87

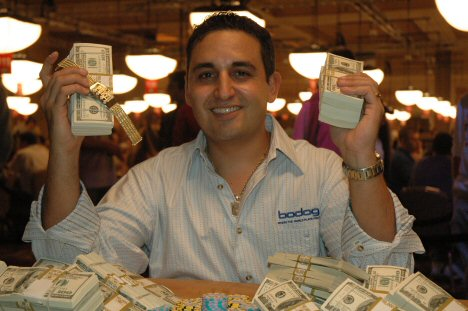
Josh Arieh won his third and fourth bracelets in Events #39 and #66

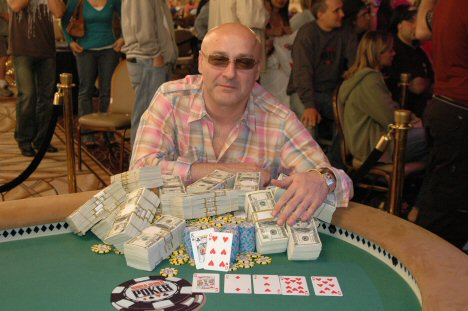
Farzad Bonyadi won his fourth bracelet in Event #49

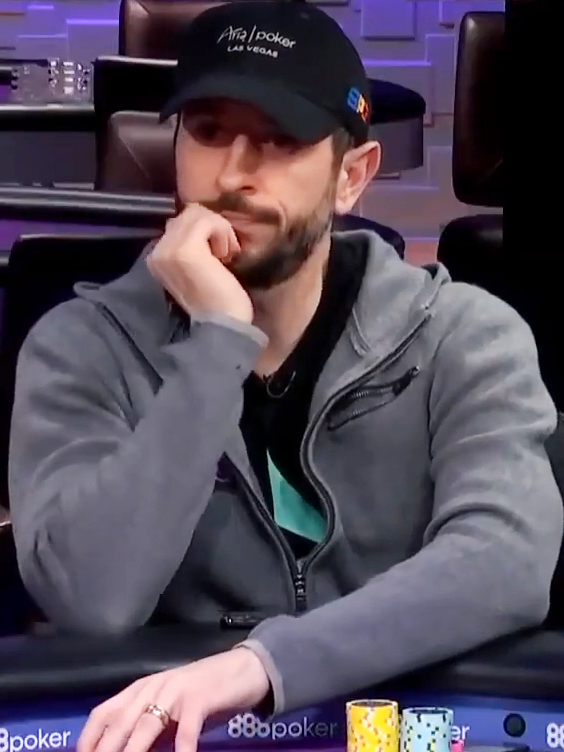
Brian Rast won his fifth bracelet in Event #51

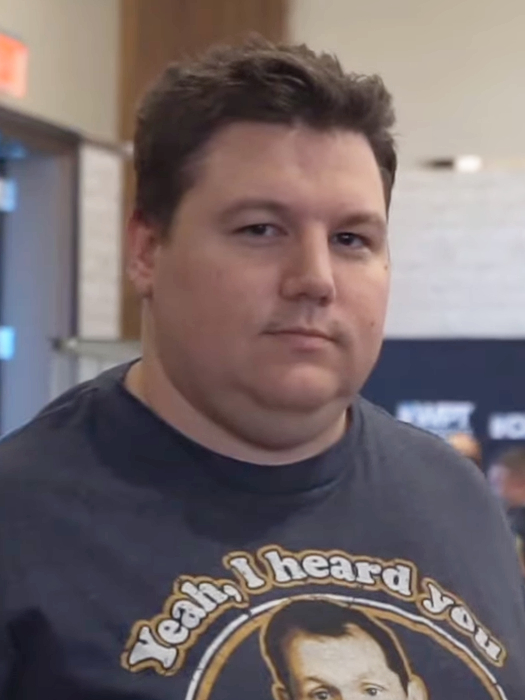
Shaun Deeb won his fifth bracelet in Event #53

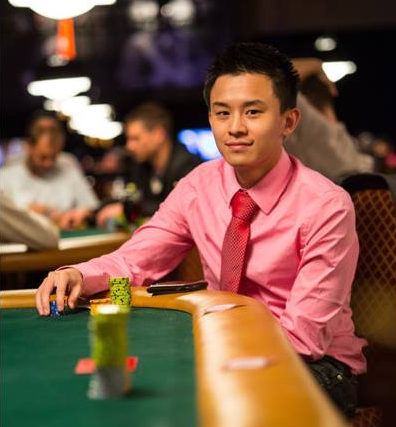
Ben Yu won his fourth bracelet in Event #56

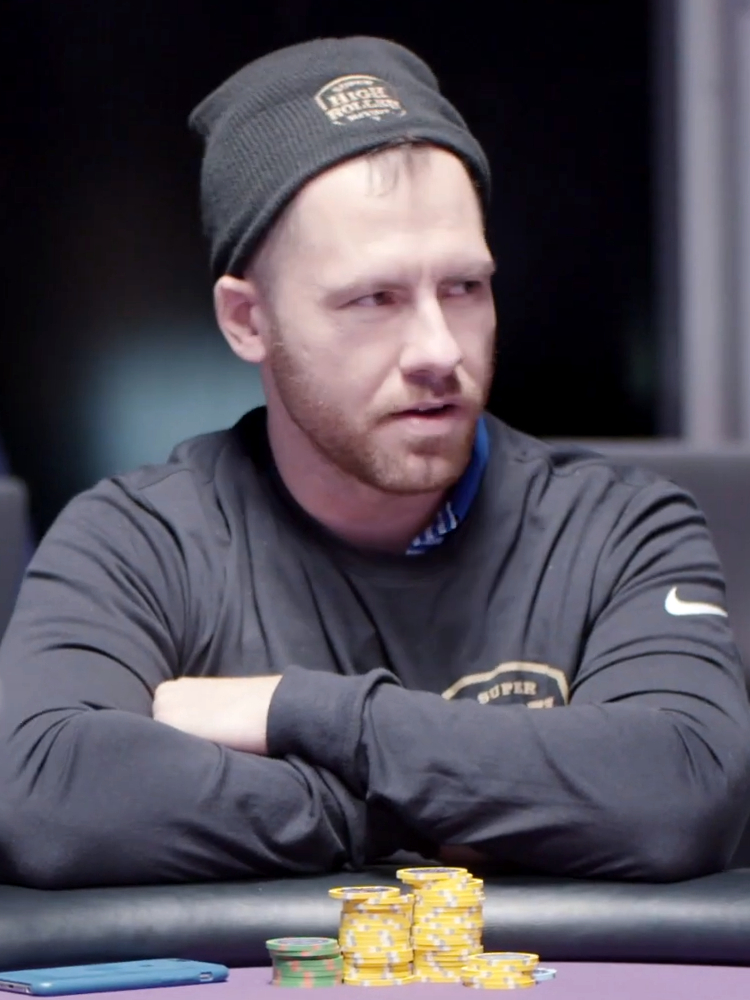
Daniel Cates won his first bracelet in Event #60

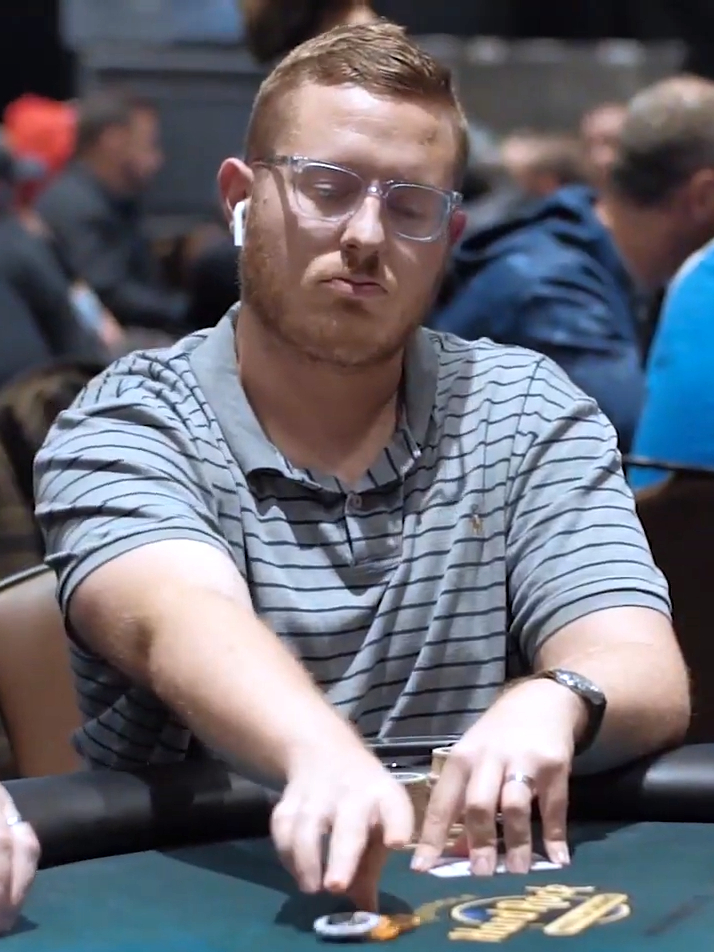
Brian Hastings won his fifth bracelet in Event #73

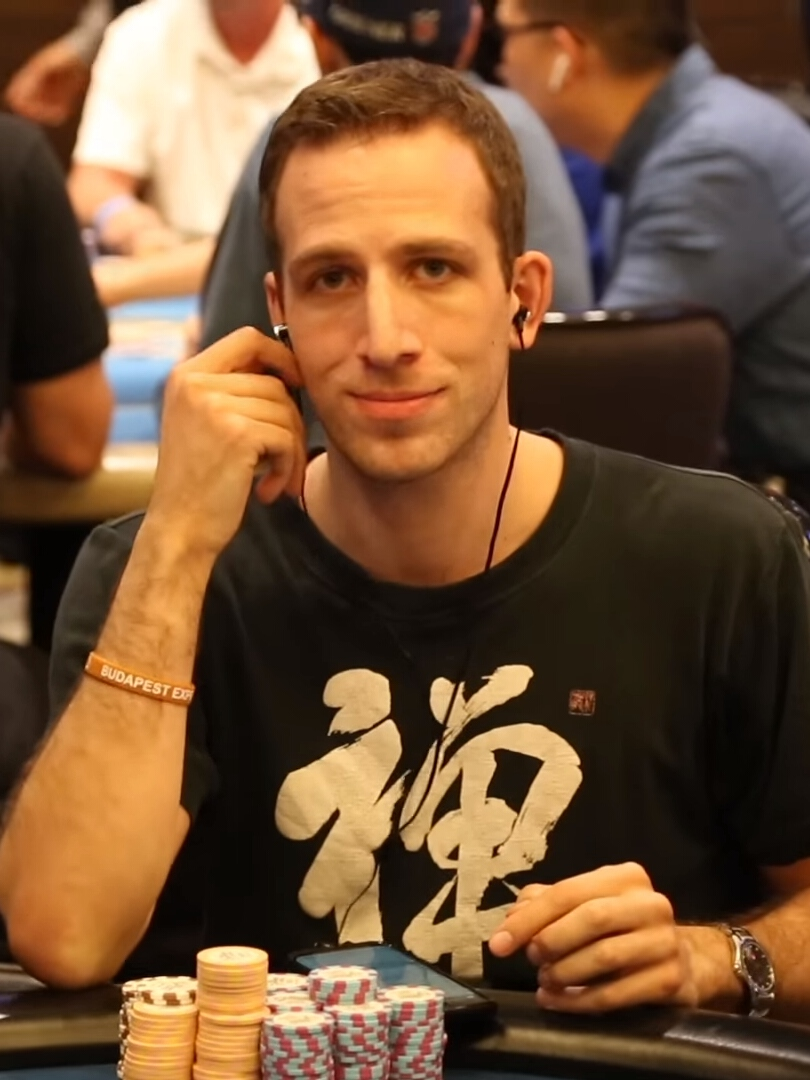
Benny Glaser won his fourth bracelet in Event #78

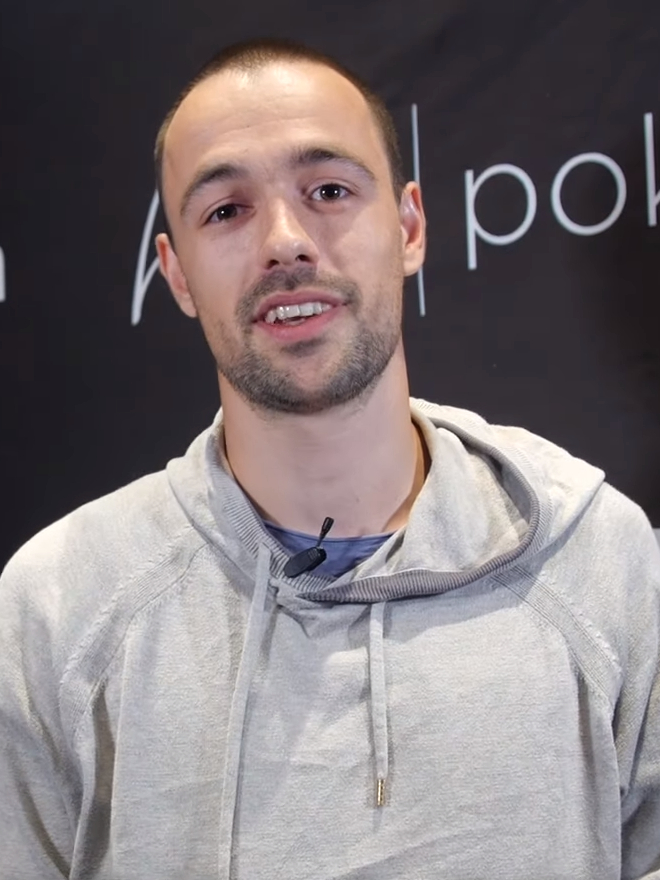
Ole Schemion won his first bracelet in Event #79

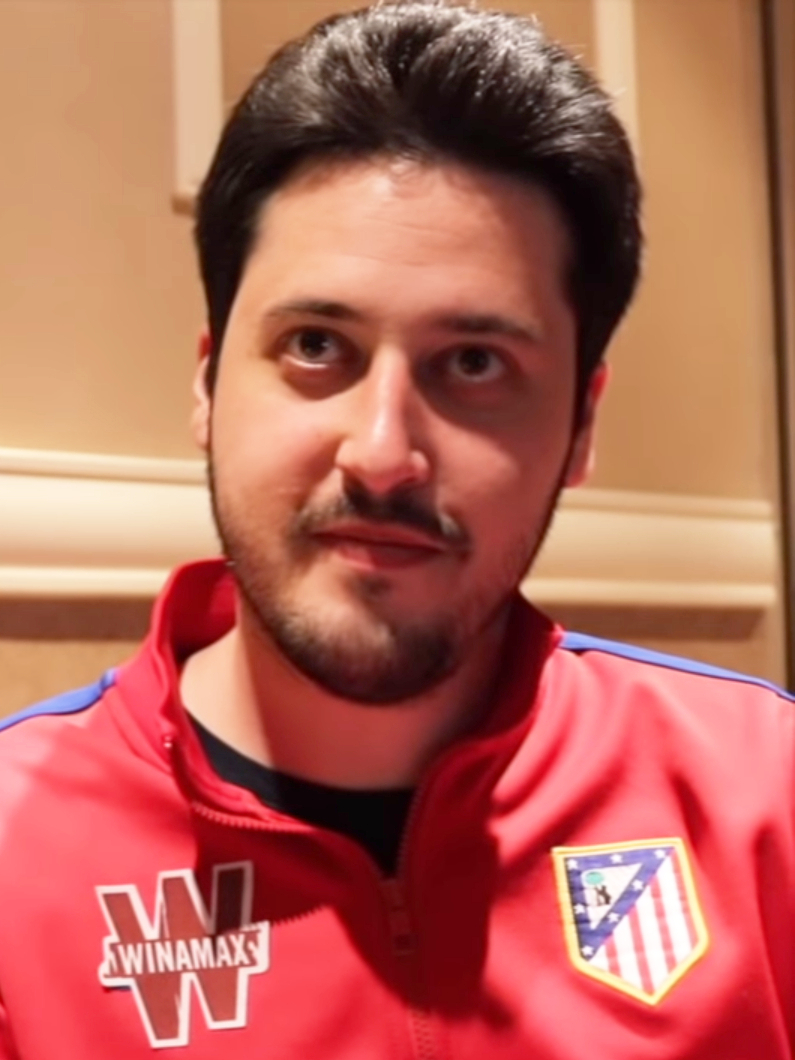
Adrián Mateos won his fourth bracelet in Event #82

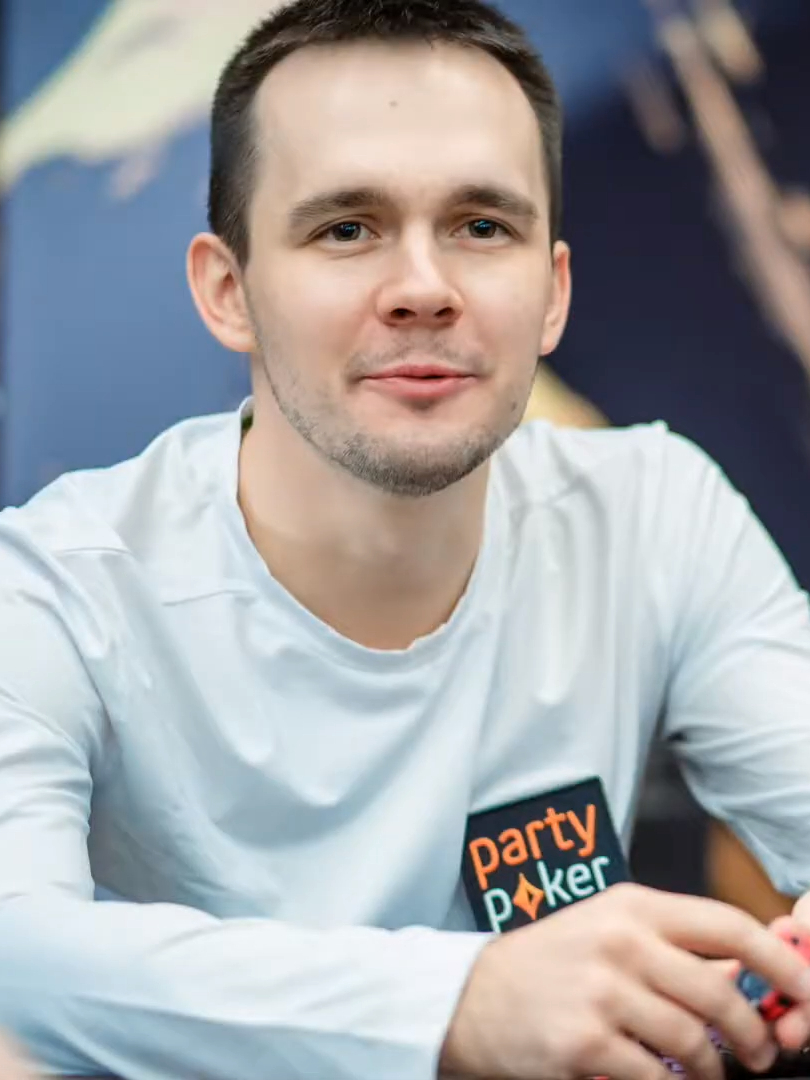
Mikita Badziakouski won his first bracelet in Event #85

Key: (bracelet number for 2021/bracelet number for career)

High stakes event ($10,000+ buy-in).
No points awarded towards Player of the Year.
Online event.

#	Event	Entrants	Winner	Prize	Runner-up	Results
1	$500 Casino Employees No Limit Hold'em	419	(United States) James Barnett (1/1)	$39,013	(United States) Jack Behrens	Results
2	$25,000 H.O.R.S.E.	78	(United States) Jesse Klein (1/1)	$552,182	(United Kingdom) Benny Glaser (0/3)	Results
3	$1,000 Covid-19 Relief No Limit Hold'em Charity Event	260	(United States) Jeremy Ausmus (1/2)	$48,687	(United States) Jesse Lonis	Results
4	$500 The Reunion No Limit Hold'em	12,973	(United States) Long Ma (1/1)	$514,604	(United States) Giuliano Lentini	Results
5	$1,500 Omaha Hi-Lo 8 or Better	607	(United States) Connor Drinan (1/2)	$163,252	(United States) Travis Pearson	Results
6	$25,000 High Roller No Limit Hold'em 8-Handed	135	(United States) Tyler Cornell (1/1)	$833,289	(United States) Michael Liang	Results
7	$1,500 Dealers Choice 6-Handed	307	(Canada) Jaswinder Lally (1/1)	$97,915	(United States) Andrew "AJ" Kelsall (0/1)	Results
o1	WSOP.com $5,300 No-Limit Hold'em Freezeout	156	(United States) Martin Zamani (2/2)	$210,600	(United States) Ankush Mandavia	
o2	WSOP.com $500 No-Limit Hold'em BIG 500	742	(United States) Mark Herm (2/2)	$89,356	(United States) Steven Rivero	
8	$600 No Limit Hold'em Deepstack	4,527	(United States) Zhi Wu (1/1)	$281,604	(United States) Ari Mezrich	Results
9	$10,000 Omaha Hi-Lo 8 or Better Championship	134	(Canada) Ari Engel (1/2)	$317,076	(United States) Zachary Milchman	Results
10	$1,000 Super Turbo Bounty No Limit Hold'em	1,640	(United States) Michael Perrone (1/1)	$152,173	(France) Pierre Calamusa	Results
11	$25,000 Heads Up No Limit Hold'em Championship	57	(United States) Jason Koon (1/1)	$243,981	(Hungary) Gabor Szabo	Results
12	$1,500 Limit Hold'em	422	(Israel) Yuval Bronshtein (1/2)	$124,374	(United States) Kevin Erickson	Results
13	$3,000 Freezeout No Limit Hold'em	720	(United States) Harvey Matthews (1/1)	$371,914	(United States) Gabriel Andrade	Results
14	$1,500 Seven Card Stud	261	(United States) Rafael Lebron (1/2)	$82,262	(United States) David Williams (0/1)	Results
15	$1,500 No Limit Hold'em 6-Handed	1,450	(United States) Bradley Jansen (1/1)	$313,403	(France) Jeremy Malod	Results
16	$10,000 Limit Hold'em Championship	92	(United States) John Monnette (1/4)	$245,680	(United States) Nate Silver	Results
17	$1,500 Millionaire Maker No Limit Hold'em	5,326	(United States) Daniel Lazrus (2/2)	$1,000,000	(United States) Darryl Ronconi	Results
18	$2,500 Mixed Triple Draw Lowball	253	(United States) Vladimir Peck (1/1)	$134,390	(United States) Venkata Tayi	Results
19	$10,000 Seven Card Stud Championship	62	(United States) Anthony Zinno (1/3)	$182,872	(Taiwan) James Chen (0/1)	Results
20	$1,000 Flip & Go No Limit Hold'em	1,240	(United States) Dejuante "DJ" Alexander (1/1)	$180,665	(United States) Jason Beck	Results
21	$1,500 Mixed Pot Limit Omaha Hi-Lo 8 or Better	641	(United States) Dylan Linde (1/1)	$170,269	(United States) Hernan Salazar	Results
o3	WSOP.com $400 No-Limit Hold'em Ultra Deepstack	1,023	(Taiwan) Pete Chen (1/1)	$82,560	(France) Tzur Levy	
22	$10,000/$1,000 Ladies No-Limit Hold'em Championship	644	(United States) Lara Eisenberg (1/1)	$115,694	(United States) Debora Brooke	Results
23	$1,500 Eight Game Mix 6-Handed	484	(United States) Ryan Leng (2/3)	$137,969	(United States) Connor Drinan (1/2)	Results
24	$600 Pot Limit Omaha Deepstack	1,572	(United States) Michael Prendergast (1/1)	$127,348	(United States) Jeffrey Barnes	Results
25	$5,000 No Limit Hold'em 6-Handed	578	(United States) Scott Ball (1/1)	$562,667	(United States) Galen Hall (0/1)	Results
26	$1,000 Freezeout No Limit Hold'em	1,358	(Czech Republic) Dalibor Dula (1/1)	$199,227	(United States) Cole Ferraro	Results
27	$1,500 H.O.R.S.E.	594	(United States) Anthony Zinno (2/4)	$160,636	(United States) Randy Ohel (0/1)	Results
28	$1,000 Pot Limit Omaha 8-Handed	1,069	(United States) Dylan Weisman (1/1)	$166,461	(United States) Craig Chait	Results
29	$10,000 Short Deck No Limit Hold'em	66	(United States) Chance Kornuth (1/3)	$194,670	(United States) Chad Campbell	Results
30	$1,500 Monster Stack No Limit Hold'em	3,520	(United States) Michael Noori (1/1)	$610,347	(United States) Ryan Leng (2/3)	Results
31	$1,500 No Limit 2-7 Lowball Draw	272	(United States) Phil Hellmuth (1/16)	$84,951	(United States) Jake Schwartz	Results
32	$3,000 H.O.R.S.E.	282	(United States) Jim Collopy (1/2)	$173,823	(United States) Ahmed Mohamed	Results
33	$800 No Limit Hold'em Deepstack	2,778	(Israel) Ran Koller (1/1)	$269,478	(Israel) Ran Ilani	Results
34	$1,500 Limit 2-7 Lowball Triple Draw	285	(United States) David "Bakes" Baker (1/3)	$87,837	(United States) Peter Lynn	Results
o4	WSOP.com $888 PLO Crazy 8's	295	(United States) Ryan Stoker (1/1)	$95,338	(United States) Tony Sinishtaj	
35	$500 Freezeout No Limit Hold'em	2,931	(United States) Anthony Koutsos (1/1)	$167,272	(Canada) Charbel Kanterjian	Results
36	$10,000 Dealers Choice 6-Handed Championship	93	(United States) Adam Friedman (1/4)	$248,350	(United States) Phil Hellmuth (1/16)	Results
37	$1,500 Super Turbo Bounty No Limit Hold'em	1,441	(Lithuania) Karolis Sereika (1/1)	$195,310	(Brazil) Pedro Padilha	Results
38	$50,000 High Roller No Limit Hold'em 8-Handed	81	(Australia) Michael Addamo (1/3)	$1,132,968	(United States) Justin Bonomo (0/3)	Results
39	$1,500 Pot Limit Omaha 8-Handed	821	(United States) Josh Arieh (1/3)	$204,766	(United States) Tommy Le (0/1)	Results
40	$10,000 H.O.R.S.E. Championship	149	(United States) Kevin Gerhart (1/3)	$361,124	(United States) Marco Johnson (0/2)	Results
41	$2,500 Freezeout No Limit Hold'em	896	(Taiwan) Carlos Chang (1/1)	$364,589	(United States) Brady Osterman	Results
42	$1,500 Razz	311	(United States) Bradley Ruben (2/3)	$99,188	(United States) Charles Sinn	Results
43	$1,000 Double Stack No Limit Hold'em	3,991	(United States) Anthony Denove (1/1)	$446,983	(Canada) David Guay	Results
44	$3,000 Limit Hold'em 6-Handed	162	(United States) Ryan Hansen (1/1)	$109,692	(Japan) Kosei Ichinose	Results
45	$10,000 Pot Limit Omaha 8-Handed Championship	344	(United States) Tommy Le (1/2)	$746,477	(United States) Jordan Spurlin	Results
46	$800 No Limit Hold'em Deepstack	2,053	(United States) Chad Norton (1/1)	$214,830	(United States) Steve Lemma	Results
47	$5,000 Freezeout No Limit Hold'em 8-Handed	421	(France) Alexandre Reard (1/1)	$428,694	(United States) Daniel Strelitz (0/1)	Results
o5	WSOP.com $1,000 Online Bracelet Championship	854	(Japan) Kazuki Ikeuchi (1/1)	$152,797	(United States) Dennis Wilber	
48	$1,500 Shootout No Limit Hold'em	800	(United States) Gershon Distenfeld (1/1)	$204,063	(Belgium) Johan Schumacher	Results
49	$10,000 No Limit 2-7 Lowball Draw Championship	122	(Iran) Farzad Bonyadi (1/4)	$297,051	(Germany) Johannes Becker (0/1)	Results
50	$600 Mixed No Limit Hold'em/Pot Limit Omaha Deepstack	1,569	(United States) Darrin Wright (1/1)	$127,219	(United States) Victor Paredes	Results
51	$3,000 No Limit Hold'em 6-Handed	997	(United States) Brian Rast (1/5)	$474,102	(United States) John Gallaher	Results
52	$1,000 Seniors No Limit Hold'em Championship	5,404	(United States) Robert McMillan (1/1)	$561,060	(United States) Robert Davis	Results
53	$25,000 High Roller Pot Limit Omaha	212	(United States) Shaun Deeb (1/5)	$1,251,860	(Hong Kong) Ka Kwan Lau	Results
54	$2,500 Nine Game Mix 6-Handed	319	(United States) Nicholas Julia (1/1)	$168,608	(United States) Kristan Lord	Results
55	$400 Colossus No Limit Hold'em	9,399	(Russia) Anatolii Zyrin (1/2)	$314,705	(United States) Michael Lee	Results
56	$10,000 No Limit Hold'em 6-Handed Championship	329	(United States) Ben Yu (1/4)	$721,453	(Russia) Nikita Kuznetsov	Results
57	$10,000 Limit 2-7 Lowball Triple Draw Championship	80	(United States) Brian Yoon (1/4)	$240,341	(United States) Danny Wong	Results
58	$1,000 Super Seniors No Limit Hold'em	1,893	(France) Jean-Luc Adam (1/1)	$255,623	(United States) Eugene Solomon	Results
59	$1,000 Tag Team No Limit Hold'em	641	(United States) Mike Ruter (1/1) (United States) Sam Dighlawi (1/1)	$56,683 $56,683	(Israel) Tomer Wolf (Israel) David Lander	Results
60	$50,000 Poker Players Championship	63	(United States) Daniel Cates (1/1)	$954,020	(United States) Ryan Leng (2/3)	Results
o6	WSOP.com $666 Online Bracelet	1,029	(United States) John Ripnick (1/1)	$114,898	(Canada) Matthew Gillingham	
61	$600 No Limit Hold'em Deepstack Championship	3,916	(United States) Cole Ferraro (1/1)	$252,491	(United States) Sami Rustim	Results
62	$1,500 Pot Limit Omaha Hi-Lo 8 or Better	725	(United States) Kevin Gerhart (2/4)	$186,789	(United States) Dustin Dirksen	Results
63	$500 Salute to Warriors No Limit Hold'em	1,738	(United States) Eric Zhang (1/1)	$102,465	(United States) Guy Hadas	Results
64	$5,000 Mixed No Limit Hold'em/Pot Limit Omaha	579	(Finland) Eelis Parssinen (1/1)	$545,616	(United States) Noah Bronstein	Results
65	$1,000 Mini Main Event No Limit Hold'em	3,823	(Greece) Georgios Sotiropoulos (2/3)	$432,575	(Japan) Wataru Miyashita	Results
66	$10,000 Pot Limit Omaha Hi-Lo 8 or Better Championship	194	(United States) Josh Arieh (2/4)	$484,791	(United States) Danny Chang	Results
o7	WSOP.com $3,200 No-Limit Hold'em High Roller 8 Max	434	(United States) Jacob Neff (1/1)	$318,889	(United States) Chad Eveslage	
67	$10,000 No Limit Hold'em Main Event	6,650	(Germany) Koray Aldemir (1/1)	$8,000,000	(United States) George Holmes	Results
68	$1,111 Little One for One Drop No Limit Hold'em	3,797	(United States) Scott Ball (2/2)	$396,445	(United States) Michael Shanahan	Results
69	$1,500 Seven Card Stud Hi-Lo 8 or Better	372	(United States) Jermaine Reid (1/1)	$113,459	(United States) Peder Berge	Results
70	$888 Crazy Eights No Limit Hold'em	5,252	(United States) David Moses (1/1)	$888,888	(South Korea) Sejin Park (0/1)	Results
71	$1,500 Bounty Pot Limit Omaha 8-Handed	860	(France) Mourad Amokrane (1/1)	$132,844	(United States) Matt Mamiya	Results
72	$1,500 Mixed No Limit Hold'em/Pot Limit Omaha	846	(Japan) Motoyoshi Okamura (1/1)	$209,716	(Brazil) Rafael Mota	Results
73	$10,000 Seven Card Stud Hi-Lo 8 or Better Championship	144	(United States) Brian Hastings (1/5)	$352,958	(United States) Ian O'Hara	Results
74	$2,500 Mixed Big Bet Event	212	(Russia) Denis Strebkov (1/2)	$117,898	(United States) Jerry Wong	Results
o8	WSOP.com $7,777 Lucky 7's No-Limit Hold'em High Roller	183	(Latvia) Aleksejs Ponakovs (1/1)	$432,491	(Canada) Jaroslaw Jaskiewicz	
o9	WSOP.com $777 Lucky 7's No Limit Hold'em	732	(Bulgaria) Yuliyan Kolev (1/1)	$146,163	(United States) Tim Reilly	
75	$1,500 Freezeout No Limit Hold'em	1,191	(United States) Chad Himmelspach (1/1)	$270,877	(Germany) Stefan Reiser	Results
76	$10,000 Super Turbo Bounty No Limit Hold'em	307	(France) Romain Lewis (1/1)	$463,885	(India) Aditya Agarwal	Results
77	$1,500 Fifty Stack No Limit Hold'em	1,501	(Brazil) Paulo Joanello (1/1)	$321,917	(United States) Toby Price	Results
78	$10,000 Razz Championship	109	(United Kingdom) Benny Glaser (1/4)	$274,693	(United States) Everett Carlton	Results
79	$1,979 Poker Hall of Fame Bounty No Limit Hold'em	468	(Germany) Ole Schemion (1/1)	$172,499	(Canada) Benjamin Underwood	Results
80	$3,000 Pot Limit Omaha 6-Handed	496	(United Kingdom) Robert Cowen (1/1)	$280,916	(United Kingdom) Robert Emmerson	Results
81	$800 No Limit Hold'em Deepstack	1,921	(United States) Jason Wheeler (1/1)	$204,274	(Colombia) Julian Velasquez	Results
82	$250,000 Super High Roller No Limit Hold'em	33	(Spain) Adrián Mateos (1/4)	$3,265,362	(United Kingdom) Ben Heath (0/1)	Results
83	$1,500 The Closer No Limit Hold'em	1,903	(Spain) Leo Margets (1/1)	$376,850	(Bulgaria) Alex Kulev	Results
84	$50,000 High Roller Pot Limit Omaha	85	(United States) Jeremy Ausmus (2/3)	$1,188,918	(United States) Phil Hellmuth (1/16)	Results
85	$50,000 High Roller No Limit Hold'em	113	(Belarus) Mikita Badziakouski (1/1)	$1,462,043	(United States) Ren Lin	Results
86	$1,000 Super Turbo No Limit Hold'em	1,025	(United States) Michael McCauley (1/1)	$161,384	(United Kingdom) Andrew Wilson	Results
87	$100,000 High Roller No Limit Hold'em	64	(Australia) Michael Addamo (2/4)	$1,958,569	(United States) Kevin Rabichow	Results
o10	WSOP.com $1,000 Mini Main Event (PA only)	171	(United States) David Eldridge (1/1)	$41,553	(United States) Zachary Weatherford	
o11	WSOP.com $1,000 Mini Main Event	774	(United States) Daniel Turner (1/1)	$142,663	(United States) Dylan DeStefano	
88	$5,000 No Limit Hold'em 8-Handed	531	(Bulgaria) Boris Kolev (1/1)	$511,184	(Israel) Uri Reichenstein	Results

== Player of the Year ==
Final standings as of November 23 (note: does not include events from the 2021 WSOP Online series or the 2021 WSOP Europe series)

Standings
Rank	Name	Points	Bracelets
1	(United States) Josh Arieh	4,194.59	2
2	(United States) Phil Hellmuth	3,720.01	1
3	(Canada) Daniel Negreanu	3,531.03	0
4	(United States) Ben Yu	3,345.92	1
5	(United States) Jeremy Ausmus	3,272.57	2
6	(United States) Shaun Deeb	3,119.45	1
7	(United States) Ryan Leng	3,042.21	1
8	(United States) Dylan Linde	2,976.62	1
9	(Germany) Koray Aldemir	2,911.73	1
10	(United States) Scott Ball	2,907.94	2

== Main Event ==
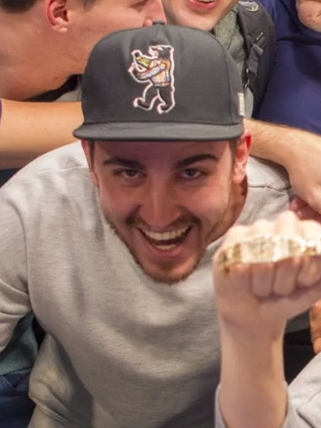
Main Event champion Koray Aldemir

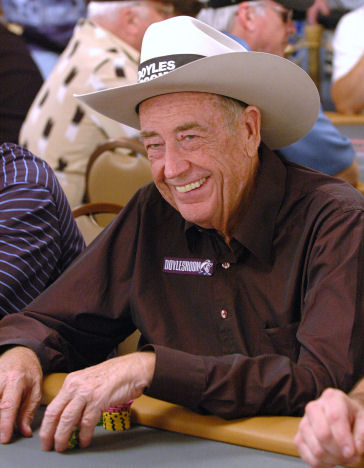
Doyle Brunson made his first appearance at the Main Event since 2013

The $10,000 No Limit Hold'em Main Event began on November 4. The total number of entries in the Main Event were 6,650, the fewest since 2012, excluding the 2020 Main Event, which was impacted by the COVID-19 pandemic.

=== Performance of past champions ===
Name	Championship Year(s)	Day of Elimination
Doyle Brunson	1976, 1977	2ABD
Tom McEvoy	1983	2ABD
Johnny Chan	1987, 1988	1B
Phil Hellmuth	1989	3
Scotty Nguyen	1998	2CEF
Chris Moneymaker	2003	5 (260th)*
Greg Raymer	2004	1D
Joe Hachem	2005	3
Jerry Yang	2007	3
Ryan Riess	2013	2ABD
Martin Jacobson	2014	4 (844th)*
Joe McKeehen	2015	1D
Qui Nguyen	2016	5 (241st)*
Scott Blumstein	2017	3
Hossein Ensan	2019	2CEF
Damian Salas	2020	1A

*- Denotes player who finished in the money

=== Other notable high finishes ===
NB: This list is restricted to top 100 finishers with an existing Wikipedia entry.

Place	Name	Prize
45th	Nick Petrangelo	$163,900
89th	Stephen Chidwick	$68,900

=== Final Table ===
Name	Number of chips (percentage of total)	WSOP Bracelets	WSOP Cashes*	WSOP Earnings*
(Germany) Koray Aldemir	140,000,000 (35.1%)	0	30	$3,040,322
(United States) George Holmes	83,700,000 (21.0%)	0	1	$50,855
(Argentina) Alejandro Lococo	46,800,000 (11.7%)	0	1	$3,654
(United States) Joshua Remitio	40,000,000 (10.0%)	0	0	$0
(United Kingdom) Jack Oliver	30,400,000 (7.6%)	0	2	$7,523
(Turkey) Özgür Seçilmiş	24,500,000 (6.1%)	0	6	$19,460
(United States) Henry Park	13,500,000 (3.4%)	0	22	$240,280
(United States) Chase Bianchi	12,100,000 (3.0%)	1	5	$334,932
(United Kingdom) Jareth East	8,300,000 (2.1%)	0	24	$132,503

*Career statistics prior to the Main Event

=== Final Table results ===
Place	Name	Prize
1st	Koray Aldemir	$8,000,000
2nd	George Holmes	$4,300,000
3rd	Jack Oliver	$3,000,000
4th	Joshua Remitio	$2,300,000
5th	Özgür Seçilmiş	$1,800,000
6th	Henry Park	$1,400,000
7th	Alejandro Lococo	$1,225,000
8th	Jareth East	$1,100,000
9th	Chase Bianchi	$1,000,000

== The Poker Players Championship ==
The $50,000 Poker Players Championship began on October 31. The 7-handed final table was reached on November 3, and the final 5-handed was played on November 4.

The event attracted 63 entries, generating a prize pool of $3,016,125. It was the lowest turnout in the event's history. The top 10 players finished in the money, with the champion earning $954,020.

=== Performance of past champions ===
Name	Championship Year(s)	Day of Elimination
Freddy Deeb	2007	2
Michael Mizrachi	2010, 2012, 2018	2
Brian Rast	2011, 2016	3
Matthew Ashton	2013	1

*- Denotes player who finished in the money

=== Other notable high finishes ===
NB: This list is restricted to in the money finishers with an existing Wikipedia entry.

Place	Name	Prize
8th	Nick Schulman	$106,120
9th	Daniel Negreanu	$91,595

=== Final Table results ===
Daniel Cates won the Poker Players Championship for his first overall bracelet.

Place	Name	Prize
1st	(United States) Daniel Cates	$954,020
2nd	(United States) Ryan Leng	$589,628
3rd	(United States) Paul Volpe	$404,243
4th	(Israel) Eli Elezra	$286,983
5th	(United States) Chris Brewer	$211,235
6th	(United States) Josh Arieh	$161,422
7th	(United States) Matthew Glantz	$128,256
