= Ari Engel =

Canadian poker player

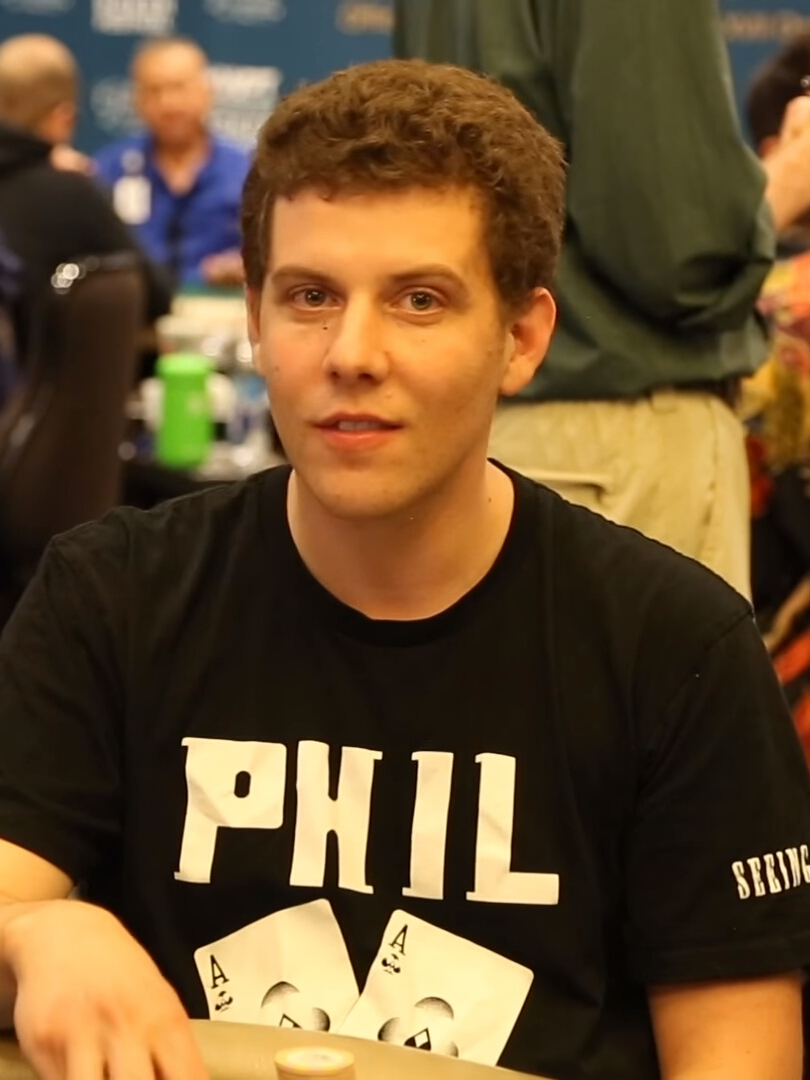
- Nicknames: BodogAri; BacBillNat9

World Series of Poker
- Bracelets: 4
- Final tables: 19 (including unofficial)
- Money finishes: 160
- Highest WSOP Main Event finish: 130th, 2022

World Poker Tour
- Money finishes: 21

European Poker Tour
- Final table: 1
- Money finishes: 4
- World Series of Poker Circuit
- Circuit ring(s): 17
- Final table(s): 87 (including unofficial)

Alan "Ari" Engel is a Canadian professional mid-high stakes poker player, primarily active on the World Series of Poker Tour but with perhaps more success on the World Series of Poker Circuit Tour, with a record 17 World Series of Poker circuit rings.

Engel first had major poker tournament success with a victory in the WSOP Circuit in Atlantic City in 2007. In August 2016, Engel had a third-place finish at the EPT € 10,000 + 300 No Limit Hold'em - High Roller 8 Handed event for € 307,900.

He has won four World Series of Poker bracelets. He won his first WSOP bracelet in a $2,500 No Limit Hold'em event for $427,399 in 2019. His second bracelet came in the World Series of Poker Omaha Hi/Lo 8 or Better World Championship in 2021. ($317,076). He won his third in the $500 No Limit Hold'em - Turbo 6-Max (Online Bracelet Event #28) in 2023. His last bracelet was also won online in a $400 No Limit Hold'em Turbo (Online Bracelet Event #29) in 2024.

Engel's best result to date is a first-place finish in the 2016 Aussie Millions Poker Championship, his only 7-digit score, for $1,120,110.

As of 2026, Engel's total live tournament winnings exceeded $10,000,000. He ranked tenth among Canadian poker players in regard to all-time winnings.

== World Series of Poker bracelets ==
Year	Tournament	Prize (US$)
2019	$2,500 No Limit Hold'em (Event #48)	$427,399
2021	$10,000 Omaha Hi/Lo 8 or Better - Championship (Event #9)	$317,076
2023O	$500 No Limit Hold'em - Turbo 6-Max (Online Bracelet Event #28)	$38,197
2024O	$400 No Limit Hold'em - Turbo (Online Bracelet Event #29)	$34,200

An "O" following a year denotes bracelet(s) won during the World Series of Poker Online
