= Anthony Zinno =

American poker player (born 1981)

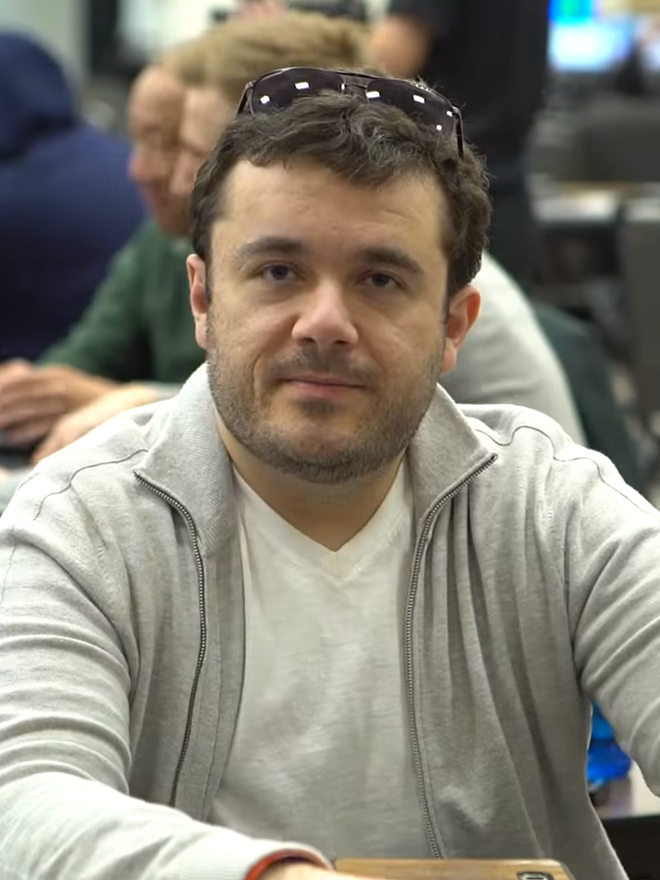
- Zinno at LAPC 2018
- Nickname: Ant
- Born: 1981 (age 44–45); Cranston, Rhode Island, U.S.

World Series of Poker
- Bracelets: 5
- Final tables: 41
- Money finishes: 187
- Highest WSOP Main Event finish: 205th, 2008

World Poker Tour
- Titles: 3
- Final tables: 7
- Money finishes: 39

Anthony Zinno (born 1981) is a professional poker player from Cranston, Rhode Island. He has won three World Poker Tour (WPT) titles and four World Series of Poker (WSOP) bracelets.

Zinno earned a degree in chemical engineering from Worcester Polytechnic Institute, then graduated from Suffolk University Law School in Boston and passed the Massachusetts state bar exam before becoming a professional poker player. In 2008, he cashed in the WSOP Main Event in 205th place, earning $38,600. His first WPT title came in September 2013, when he prevailed over a field of 1,189 and defeated Vanessa Selbst heads-up at the Borgata Poker Open, earning $825,099. In 2015, he added two more WPT titles in consecutive events. First, he won the Fallsview Poker Classic, then he won the L.A. Poker Classic for $1,015,860. His victory at the LAPC was his third WPT championship, tying Gus Hansen and Carlos Mortensen for the record. With these two victories and multiple cashes, Zinno was awarded the WPT Player of the Year for Season 13.

At the 2015 WSOP, Zinno cashed five times and made the final table each time. He finished 7th in the $111,111 High Roller for One Drop for $565,000, then won the $25,000 High Roller Pot Limit Omaha event, earning $1,122,000 and his first career bracelet. At the 2019 WSOP he cashed nine times and made three final tables, and won his second bracelet and $279,920 in the $1,500 Pot-Limit Omaha Hi/Lo 8 or Better. At the 2019 WSOP Europe he finished third in the €10,350 Main Event for €485,291. At the 2021 WSOP he won his third bracelet in the $10,000 Seven Card Stud Championship for $182,872 and his fourth bracelet in the $1,500 H.O.R.S.E for $160,636. In his WSOP career, he has 111 cashes and earnings of $4,232,711.

As of 2025, Zinno has total tournament winnings exceeding $12 million.

World Series of Poker Bracelets
Year	Tournament	Prize (US$)
2015	$25,000 High Roller Pot Limit Omaha	$1,122,196
2019	$1,500 Pot Limit Omaha Hi-Lo 8 or Better	$279,920
2021	$10,000 Seven Card Stud Championship	$182,872
2021	$1,500 H.O.R.S.E.	$160,636
2024O	$500 No-Limit Hold'em Fall Saver	$48,649
