= Yuval Bronshtein =

Israeli poker player

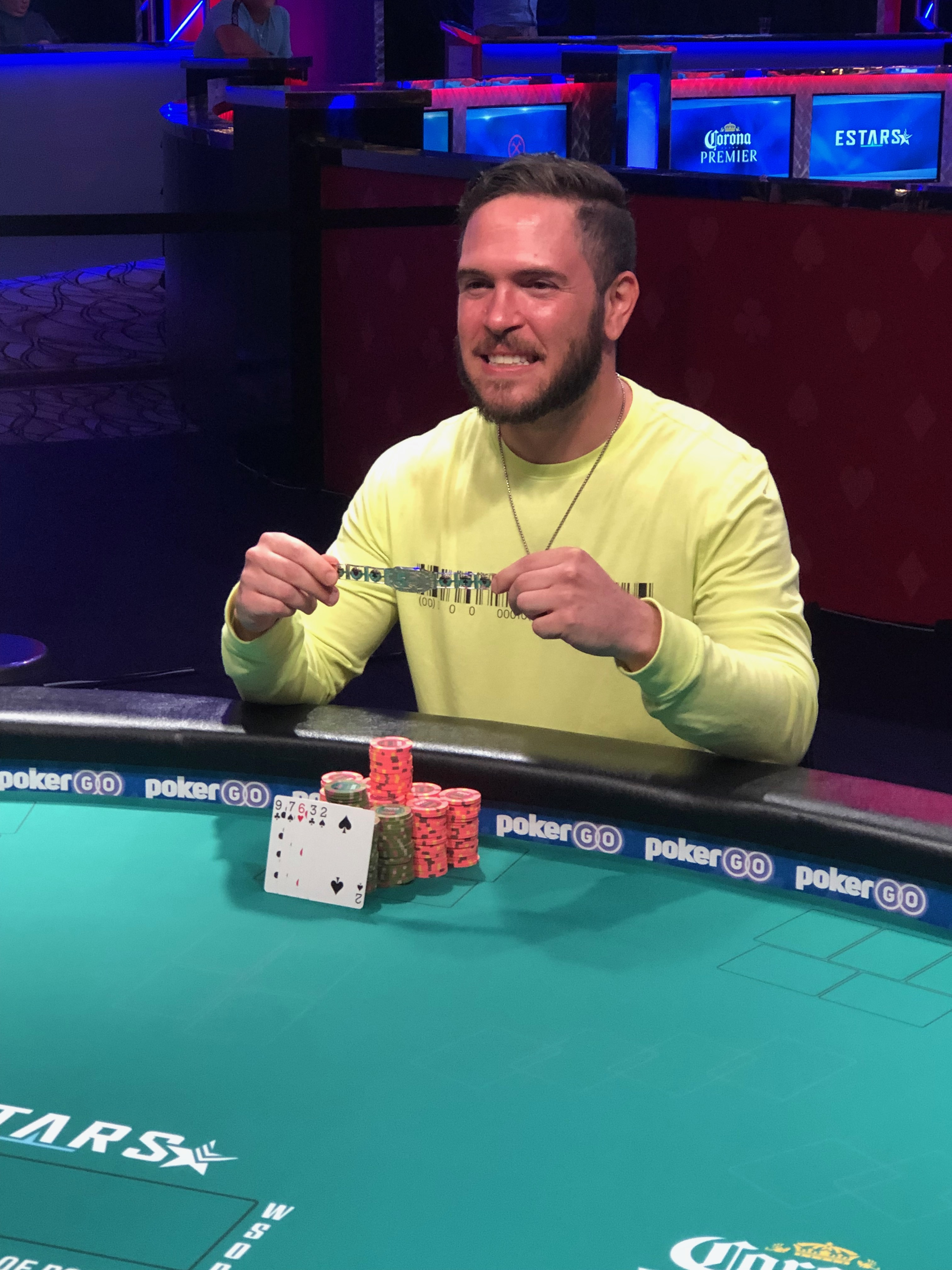
- Bronshtein at the 2019 World Series of Poker
- Born: יובל ברונשטיין; Israel
- Occupation: professional poker player

Yuval Bronshtein (Hebrew: יובל ברונשטיין) is an Israeli-born professional poker player based in the United States.

== Career ==
Bronshtein's first World Series of Poker (WSOP) cash came in June 2007, when he placed 3rd in $2,000 pot limit holdem for $109,018.

He followed that up by playing the inaugural World Series of Poker Europe (WSOPE) in London September 2007, and placing 6th in £2,500 HORSE In 2008, Bronshtein returned to WSOPE London, and narrowly missed final tabling the same event, when Phil Ivey busted him 10th.

Bronshtein became famous playing poker in August 2008, when he made online poker history by winning two FTOPs on the same day. Bronshtein had bested a field of 655 in $535 HORSE for $70,412.50, and a field of 2,472 in $216 NL Holdem turbo for another $101,975. Bronshtein won a record four FTOPs during the series's duration.

At the 2012 WSOP, Bronshtein made two final tables, and made a deep run in the main event, ultimately placing 23rd of 6,598 for $294,601, his largest cash to date.

At the 2019 WSOP, Bronshtein, playing at his tenth career WSOP final table, won the bracelet in $1500 No limit 2-7 single draw lowball, defeating Ajay Chabra heads up for the title and $96,278.

At his next WSOP final table in 2021, Bronshtein emerged victorious again, defeating Kevin Erickson to claim his second bracelet in the $1500 limit holdem event along with $124,374

In addition to his two WSOP bracelets, Bronshtein also won a WSOP Europe side event in 2012, a WSOP Circuit ring in 2015, and numerous other tournaments.

As of June 2026, Bronshtein has amassed over $4 million in live tournament cashes.
