= Ben Yu =

American poker player (born 1986)

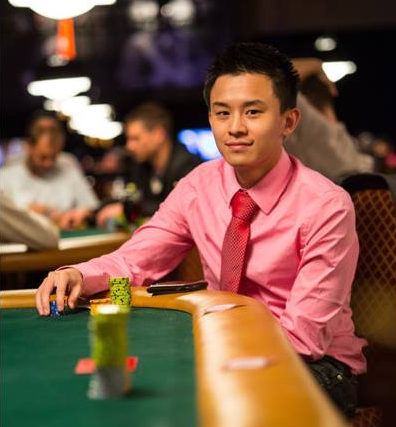
- Born: January 8, 1986 (age 40); Dayton, Ohio, U.S.

World Series of Poker
- Bracelets: 4
- Final tables: 32
- Money finishes: 247
- Highest WSOP Main Event finish: 150th, 2018

Ben Yu (born January 8, 1986) is an American professional poker player, commentator, and writer. He has won four World Series of Poker bracelets and appeared at 15 World Series of Poker (WSOP) final tables. Yu, who grew up in Los Angeles, California, attended Stanford University before transitioning into a career in poker.

== Poker career ==
As of July 2025, Yu has amassed more than $9,900,000 in live poker tournament earnings, with his cashes at the World Series of Poker accounting for at least $6,000,000 of those winnings.

Yu's columns on poker tournament strategy have appeared in Card Player magazine since 2013.

=== World Series of Poker ===
Yu's seven cashes at the 2011 World Series of Poker tied him with Kirill Rabtsov for the most in the 2011 series.

Yu's eight cashes in World Series of Poker Limit Hold'em events, including four final table finishes, total $576,415, rank him 13th all-time.

Yu has won four bracelets at the WSOP.

As of 2025, his total cashes in WSOP bracelet events ranks 20th all-time.

World Series of Poker results
Year	Cashes	Final Tables	Bracelets
2008	1		
2009	1		
2010	3	1	
2011	7		
2012	1		
2013	4	1	
2014	8	1	
2015	7	1	1
2016	11	1	
2017	12	2	1
2018	15	4	1
2019	14	2	
2021	19	2	1
2022	28	3	
2023	32	3	
2024	45	5	
2025	15	2	

World Series of Poker bracelets
Year	Event	Prize money
2015	$10,000 Limit Hold'em Championship	$291,456
2017	$10,000 Limit 2-7 Lowball Triple Draw Championship	$232,738
2018	$50,000 Big Blind Antes No Limit Hold'em High Roller	$1,650,773
2021	$10,000 6-handed No Limit Hold'em Championship	$721,453
