= 2023 World Series of Poker results =

Below are the results for the 2023 World Series of Poker, held from May 30-July 18 at Horseshoe Las Vegas and Paris Las Vegas in Las Vegas, Nevada. There were 95 bracelet events.

== Key ==
*	Elected to the Poker Hall of Fame
(#/#)	This denotes a bracelet winner. The first number is the number of bracelets won in the 2023 WSOP. The second number is the total number of bracelets won. Both numbers represent totals as of that point during the tournament.
Place	What place each player at the final table finished
Name	The player who made it to the final table
Prize (US$)	The amount of money awarded for each finish at the event's final table

== Results ==
=== Event #1: $500 Casino Employees No-Limit Hold'em ===
- 2-Day Event: May 30-31
- Number of Entries: 1,015
- Total Prize Pool: $426,300
- Number of Payouts: 153
- Winning Hand: K♠ 10♣

Final Table
Place	Name	Prize
1st	(United States) Peter Thai (1/1)	$75,535
2nd	(United States) James Urbanic	$46,690
3rd	(United States) Paul Blanchette	$33,051
4th	(United States) Bruce Jiang	$23,738
5th	(United States) Benson Tam	$17,303
6th	(Canada) Sean Balfour	$12,802
7th	(United States) Keith McCormack	$9,617
8th	(United States) Joe Pavan	$7,337
9th	(United States) Lisa Eckstein	$5,686

=== Event #2: $25,000 High Roller Six Handed No-Limit Hold'em ===
- 3-Day Event: May 30-June 1
- Number of Entries: 207
- Total Prize Pool: $4,864,500
- Number of Payouts: 32
- Winning Hand: A♦ Q♠

Final Table
Place	Name	Prize
1st	(Switzerland) Alexandre Vuilleumier (1/1)	$1,215,864
2nd	(United States) Chance Kornuth (0/3)	$751,463
3rd	(United States) Sean Winter	$518,106
4th	(France) Axel Hallay	$363,326
5th	(China) Ren Lin	$259,220
6th	(United States) Joey Weissman (0/1)	$188,219

=== Event #3: $1,000 Mystery Millions No-Limit Hold'em ===
- 6-Day Event: May 31-June 5
- Number of Entries: 18,188
- Total Prize Pool: $10,730,920
- Number of Payouts: 2,560
- Winning Hand: Q♦ 7♥

Final Table
Place	Name	Prize
1st	(United States) Tyler Brown (1/1)	$1,000,000
2nd	(United States) Guang Chen	$561,320
3rd	(United States) Ryan Mcknight	$429,360
4th	(Costa Rica) Steven Thompson	$330,150
5th	(United States) Rhian Fineis	$255,210
6th	(Brazil) Tauan De Oliveira	$198,320
7th	(United States) Dan Shak	$154,940
8th	(Canada) Tam Ho	$121,683
9th	(United States) Raymond Taylor	$96,100

=== Event #4: Tournament of Champions ===
- 3-Day Event: May 31-June 2
- Number of Entries: 741
- Total Prize Pool: $1,000,000
- Number of Payouts: 100
- Winning Hand: J♠ 5♥

Final Table
Place	Name	Prize
1st	(United States) Ronnie Day (1/1)	$200,000
2nd	(United States) Brent Gregory	$120,000
3rd	(United States) Patrick White	$87,000
4th	(United States) Hunter McClelland	$63,000
5th	(United States) Wissam Gahshan	$46,000
6th	(Canada) Justin Hotte-McKinnon	$35,000
7th	(United States) Barry Schultz	$26,000
8th	(United States) Daniel Marx	$20,000
9th	(United States) Zachary Gruneberg	$16,000

=== Event #5: $1,500 Dealers Choice 6-Handed ===
- 3-Day Event: May 31-June 2
- Number of Entries: 456
- Total Prize Pool: $608,760
- Number of Payouts: 69
- Winning Hand: Q♥ 7♠ (No-Limit Hold'em)

Final Table
Place	Name	Prize
1st	(United States) Chad Eveslage (1/2)	$131,879
2nd	(United States) Andrew Kelsall (0/1)	$81,509
3rd	(United States) Nick Kost (0/1)	$54,247
4th	(United States) John Racener (0/1)	$36,953
5th	(Canada) Clayton Mozdzen	$25,779
6th	(United States) James Johnson	$18,428

=== Event #6: $5,000 Mixed No-Limit Hold'em/Pot-Limit Omaha ===
- 2-Day Event: June 1-2
- Number of Entries: 568
- Total Prize Pool: $2,612,800
- Number of Payouts: 86
- Winning Hand: K♦ J♣ 10♠ 4♦

Final Table
Place	Name	Prize
1st	(United States) Michael Moncek (1/2)	$534,499
2nd	(Switzerland) Fernando Habegger	$330,344
3rd	(Canada) Alex Livingston (0/1)	$235,062
4th	(United States) Michael Banducci (0/1)	$169,674
5th	(United States) Christian Harder	$124,266
6th	(United States) Tyler Brown	$92,362
7th	(Canada) Kristen Foxen (0/3)	$69,683
8th	(Hungary) Ferenc Deak	$53,377
9th	(Israel) Yuval Bronshtein (0/2)	$41,521

=== Event #7: $1,500 Limit Hold'em ===
- 3-Day Event: June 1-3
- Number of Entries: 527
- Total Prize Pool: $703,545
- Number of Payouts: 80
- Winning Hand: 10♦ 6♦

Final Table
Place	Name	Prize
1st	(Ukraine) Vadim Shlez (1/1)	$146,835
2nd	(Ukraine) Rostyslav Sabishchenko	$90,753
3rd	(United States) Kerry Walsh	$63,577
4th	(United States) Raul Celaya	$45,301
5th	(United States) John Armbrust	$32,840
6th	(United States) Chairud Vangchailued	$24,228
7th	(Canada) Jason Duong	$18,196
8th	(United States) David "ODB" Baker (0/2)	$13,917

=== Event #8: $25,000 Heads Up No-Limit Hold'em Championship ===
- 3-Day Event: June 2-4
- Number of Entries: 64
- Total Prize Pool: $1,504,000
- Number of Payouts: 8
- Winning Hand: K♠ 10♠

Final Table
Place	Name	Prize
1st	(Canada) Chanracy Khun (1/1)	$507,020
2nd	(United States) Doug Polk (0/3)	$313,362
SF	(United States) Chris Brewer	$192,513
SF	(United States) Sean Winter	$192,513
QF	(Spain) Roberto Perez	$74,648
QF	(United States) Anthony Zinno (0/4)	$74,648
QF	(United States) Landon Tice	$74,648
QF	(United States) Eric Wasserson	$74,648

=== Event #9: $1,500 Seven Card Stud ===
- 3-Day Event: June 2-4
- Number of Entries: 360
- Total Prize Pool: $480,600
- Number of Payouts: 54
- Winning Hand: J♦ J♥ 10♣ 10♥ 10♦ 7♣ 3♥

Final Table
Place	Name	Prize
1st	(United States) Nick Schulman (1/4)	$110,800
2nd	(United States) Andrew Hasdal	$68,479
3rd	(United States) Hojeong Lee	$46,912
4th	(United States) John Monnette (0/4)	$32,828
5th	(United States) Shaun Deeb (0/5)	$23,476
6th	(United States) DJ Buckley	$17,166
7th	(United States) Timothy Frazin	$12,839
8th	(United States) Tab Thiptinnakon	$9,829

=== Event #10: $10,000 Dealers Choice 6-Handed Championship ===
- 3-Day Event: June 3-5
- Number of Entries: 130
- Total Prize Pool: $1,209,000
- Number of Payouts: 20
- Winning Hand: K♥ 9♥ 8♣ 4♣ 3♣ (Big O)

Final Table
Place	Name	Prize
1st	(United States) Chad Eveslage (2/3)	$311,428
2nd	(United States) Dutch Boyd (0/3)	$192,479
3rd	(United States) Zack Freeman	$139,048
4th	(United States) Dustin Dirksen	$101,709
5th	(United States) Ari Engel (0/2)	$75,341
6th	(United States) Marco Johnson (0/2)	$56,528

=== Event #11: $600 No-Limit Hold'em Deepstack ===
- 2-Day Event: June 4-5
- Number of Entries: 6,085
- Total Prize Pool: $3,103,350
- Number of Payouts: 912
- Winning Hand: J♦ 8♦

Final Table
Place	Name	Prize
1st	(United States) Kenneth O'Donnell (1/1)	$351,098
2nd	(Colombia) Jefferson Guerrero	$216,941
3rd	(Hong Kong) Ka Chun Kan	$162,371
4th	(United States) Aaron Georgelos	$122,407
5th	(United States) Robert Gittelman	$92,953
6th	(United States) Eric Pfenning	$71,104
7th	(United States) Manuel DeAlmeida	$54,794
8th	(United States) Andres Morales	$42,539
9th	(United States) Fabio Coppola	$33,274

=== Event #12: $5,000 Freezeout No-Limit Hold'em 8-Handed ===
- 3-Day Event: June 4-6
- Number of Entries: 735
- Total Prize Pool: $3,381,000
- Number of Payouts: 111
- Winning Hand: Q♠ Q♦

Final Table
Place	Name	Prize
1st	(United States) Jeremy Eyer (1/1)	$649,550
2nd	(Brazil) Felipe Ramos	$401,460
3rd	(Japan) Nozomu Shimizu	$287,106
4th	(South Korea) Jinho Hong (0/1)	$208,158
5th	(United States) Ronald Minnis	$153,032
6th	(United States) Jeffrey Halcomb	$114,102
7th	(Croatia) Ivan Galinec	$86,300
8th	(United States) Shiva Dudani	$66,226

=== Event #13: $600 Pot-Limit Omaha Deepstack ===
- 3-Day Event: June 1-3
- Number of Entries: 3,200
- Total Prize Pool: $1,632,000
- Number of Payouts: 480
- Winning Hand: K♦ K♠ 6♦ 2♦

Final Table
Place	Name	Prize
1st	(United States) Joseph Altomonte (1/1)	$217,102
2nd	(United States) Michael Holmes	$134,171
3rd	(United States) Stephen Wheeland	$100,976
4th	(United States) Jorge Ufano	$76,516
5th	(United States) Clayton Fletcher	$58,382
6th	(Canada) Xing He	$44,856
7th	(Canada) Ardit Bitincka	$34,706
8th	(United States) Jerome Hickel	$27,042
9th	(United States) Kevin Rand	$21,221

=== Event #14: $10,000 Seven Card Stud Championship ===
- 3-Day Event: June 5-7
- Number of Entries: 130
- Total Prize Pool: $1,209,000
- Number of Payouts: 20
- Winning Hand: A♦ K♣ Q♣ J♥ 10♥ 6♦ 5♥

Final Table
Place	Name	Prize
1st	(United States) Brian Yoon (1/5)	$311,433
2nd	(United States) Dan Shak	$192,479
3rd	(United States) Maxx Coleman (0/2)	$140,081
4th	(United States) Ben Yu (0/4)	$103,645
5th	(United States) George Alexander	$77,985
6th	(United States) Benjamin Diebold (0/1)	$59,688
7th	(United States) Leonard August	$46,484
8th	(United States) Max Hoffman	$36,847

=== Event #15: $1,500 6-Handed No-Limit Hold'em ===
- 3-Day Event: June 6-8
- Number of Entries: 2,454
- Total Prize Pool: $3,276,090
- Number of Payouts: 369
- Winning Hand: A♠ Q♠

Final Table
Place	Name	Prize
1st	(Brazil) Rafael Reis (1/1)	$465,501
2nd	(Spain) Daniel Barriocanal	$287,679
3rd	(France) Sarah Herzali	$207,720
4th	(Greece) Nikolaos Angelou	$151,559
5th	(United States) John Monnette (0/4)	$111,755
6th	(United States) Grant Wang	$83,289

=== Event #16: $25,000 High Roller No-Limit Hold'em 8-Handed ===
- 3-Day Event: June 6-8
- Number of Entries: 301
- Total Prize Pool: $7,073,500
- Number of Payouts: 46
- Winning Hand: A♣ J♠

Final Table
Place	Name	Prize
1st	(United States) Isaac Haxton (1/1)	$1,698,215
2nd	(United Kingdom) Ryan O'Donnell	$1,049,577
3rd	(United States) Darren Elias	$725,790
4th	(United Kingdom) Lewis Spencer	$511,782
5th	(Czech Republic) Roman Hrabec	$368,134
6th	(United States) Frank Funaro (0/1)	$270,238
7th	(United States) Brian Rast (0/5)	$202,532
8th	(Portugal) João Vieira (0/2)	$155,037

=== Event #17: $1,500 Omaha Hi-Lo 8 or Better ===
- 3-Day Event: June 6-8
- Number of Entries: 1,143
- Total Prize Pool: $1,525,905
- Number of Payouts: 172
- Winning Hand: K♥ 8♣ 6♦ 3♥

Final Table
Place	Name	Prize
1st	(United States) Jim Collopy (1/3)	$262,542
2nd	(United States) Nick Kost (0/1)	$162,266
3rd	(United States) Kyle Burnside	$117,404
4th	(United States) Qinghai Pan (0/1)	$85,977
5th	(Australia) James Obst (0/1)	$63,737
6th	(United States) Aubrey Gilbert	$47,838
7th	(United States) Kyle Cartwright (0/1)	$36,358
8th	(United States) Igor Zektser	$27,986

=== Event #18: $300 Gladiators of Poker No-Limit Hold'em ===
- 6-Day Event: June 7-12
- Number of Entries: 23,088
- Total Prize Pool: $5,679,648
- Number of Payouts: 3,173
- Winning Hand: K♠ 8♣

Final Table
Place	Name	Prize
1st	(United States) Jason Simon (1/1)	$500,332
2nd	(United States) Eric Trexler	$301,745
3rd	(United States) Wesley Cannon	$210,024
4th	(United States) Wade Wallace	$160,818
5th	(Israel) Kfir Nahum	$123,831
6th	(United States) Bohdan Slyvinskyi	$95,883
7th	(United States) Jonson Chatterley	$75,841
8th	(Brazil) Caio Sobral	$58,466
9th	(United States) Thomas Reeves	$46,051

=== Event #19: $2,500 Freezeout No-Limit Hold'em ===
- 3-Day Event: June 7-9
- Number of Entries: 1,137
- Total Prize Pool: $2,529,825
- Number of Payouts: 171
- Winning Hand: K♣ 9♠

Final Table
Place	Name	Prize
1st	(Bulgaria) Valentino Konakchiev (1/1)	$435,924
2nd	(Argentina) Andres Korn (0/1)	$269,438
3rd	(France) Alexandre Reard (0/1)	$192,723
4th	(United States) Ruben Costa	$139,671
5th	(United States) Girish Reknar	$102,577
6th	(United States) Ankit Ahuja	$76,357
7th	(United Kingdom) Niall Farrell (0/1)	$57,620
8th	(United States) Adam Swan	$44,087
9th	(China) Qiang Xu	$34,210

=== Event #20: $1,500 Badugi ===
- 4-Day Event: June 7-10
- Number of Entries: 516
- Total Prize Pool: $688,860
- Number of Payouts: 78
- Winning Hand: A♥ 7♦ 4♠ 3♣

Final Table
Place	Name	Prize
1st	(Portugal) Michael Rodrigues (1/1)	$144,678
2nd	(China) Yingui Li	$89,415
3rd	(United States) Serhii Popovych	$59,879
4th	(United States) Matt Vengrin	$40,996
5th	(Hong Kong) Danny Tang (0/1)	$28,710
6th	(United States) Owais Ahmed (0/1)	$20,577

=== Event #21: $1,000 Pot-Limit Omaha 8-Handed ===
- 3-Day Event: June 8-10
- Number of Entries: 2,017
- Total Prize Pool: $1,795,130
- Number of Payouts: 303
- Winning Hand: Q♠ 9♠ 8♥ 7♦

Final Table
Place	Name	Prize
1st	(Canada) Stephen Nahm (1/1)	$267,991
2nd	(United States) Kevin Rand	$165,616
3rd	(United States) Amir Mirrasouli	$123,060
4th	(United States) Zachary Peay	$92,231
5th	(United States) Dan Matsuzuki (0/1)	$69,729
6th	(Netherlands) Ronald Keijzer (0/1)	$53,182
7th	(Moldova) Gheorghe Butuc	$40,923
8th	(United States) Jonathan England	$31,772

=== Event #22: $10,000 Limit Hold'em Championship ===
- 3-Day Event: June 8-10
- Number of Entries: 134
- Total Prize Pool: $1,246,200
- Number of Payouts: 21
- Winning Hand: 9♣ 4♣

Final Table
Place	Name	Prize
1st	(United States) Josh Arieh (1/5)	$316,226
2nd	(Canada) Daniel Idema (0/3)	$195,443
3rd	(Japan) Nozomu Shimizu	$144,069
4th	(United States) Joe McKeehen (0/3)	$107,540
5th	(United States) Louis Hillman	$81,298
6th	(United States) Nick Pupillo	$62,255
7th	(United States) Nick Schulman (1/4)	$48,298
8th	(United States) Kevin Song (0/1)	$37,967

=== Event #23: $50,000 High Roller No-Limit Hold'em ===
- 3-Day Event: June 9-11
- Number of Entries: 124
- Total Prize Pool: $5,921,000
- Number of Payouts: 19
- Winning Hand: Q♣ J♦

Final Table
Place	Name	Prize
1st	(Germany) Leon Sturm (1/1)	$1,546,024
2nd	(United States) Bill Klein	$955,513
3rd	(Netherlands) Jans Arends (0/1)	$694,019
4th	(United States) Alex Foxen (0/1)	$512,824
5th	(United States) Seth Davies	$385,617
6th	(United States) Justin Bonomo (0/3)	$295,169
7th	(United States) Sam Soverel (0/1)	$230,066
8th	(South Korea) Sung Joo Hyun	$182,662

=== Event #24: $1,500 Razz ===
- 3-Day Event: June 9-11
- Number of Entries: 556
- Total Prize Pool: $742,260
- Number of Payouts: 84
- Winning Hand: A♠ A♥ 7♣ 7♦ J♥ 4♣ 3♥

Final Table
Place	Name	Prize
1st	(United States) David "ODB" Baker (1/3)	$152,991
2nd	(United States) Justin Liberto (0/1)	$94,558
3rd	(United States) Chris Hundley	$66,659
4th	(Japan) Takashi Ogura	$47,743
5th	(Australia) Jeff Lisandro (0/6)	$34,752
6th	(United States) Everett Carlton	$25,714
7th	(Canada) William Burke	$19,347
8th	(Poland) Dzmitry Urbanovich	$14,805

=== Event #25: $10,000 Omaha Hi-Lo 8 or Better Championship ===
- 4-Day Event: June 10-13
- Number of Entries: 212
- Total Prize Pool: $1,971,600
- Number of Payouts: 32
- Winning Hand: K♦ 10♥ 8♥ 5♠

Final Table
Place	Name	Prize
1st	(United States) Ben Lamb (1/2)	$492,795
2nd	(United States) James Chen	$304,571
3rd	(Mexico) Luis Velador (0/2)	$211,715
4th	(United States) Erik Seidel* (0/9)	$150,445
5th	(United States) Robert Yass	$109,340
6th	(United States) Brad Ruben (0/4)	$81,317
7th	(Germany) Johannes Becker (0/1)	$61,919
8th	(Australia) James Obst (0/1)	$48,300

=== Event #26: $800 No-Limit Hold'em Deepstack ===
- 2-Day Event: June 11-12
- Number of Entries: 4,747
- Total Prize Pool: $3,341,888
- Number of Payouts: 711
- Winning Hand: A♦ 8♠

Final Table
Place	Name	Prize
1st	(China) Renji Mao (1/1)	$402,588
2nd	(United States) Matthew Elsby (0/1)	$248,833
3rd	(United States) Anthony Potis	$186,250
4th	(United States) J.J. Liu	$140,442
5th	(Taiwan) Ta-Wei Tou	$106,693
6th	(China) Qiwen Chen	$81,666
7th	(South Africa) Jesse Rosen	$62,984
8th	(Italy) Vito Branciforte	$48,947
9th	(United States) Michael Younan	$38,332

=== Event #27: $1,500 Eight Game Mix ===
- 3-Day Event: June 11-13
- Number of Entries: 789
- Total Prize Pool: $1,053,315
- Number of Payouts: 119
- Winning Hand: K♥ 10♣ (No-Limit Hold'em)

Final Table
Place	Name	Prize
1st	(United States) Shaun Deeb (1/6)	$198,854
2nd	(Brazil) Aloisio Dourado	$122,910
3rd	(United States) Kyle Loman	$84,329
4th	(United States) John Bunch	$58,888
5th	(United States) Daniel Strelitz (0/2)	$41,867
6th	(United States) Craig Carrillo	$30,315

=== Event #28: $1,500 Freezeout No-Limit Hold'em ===
- 3-Day Event: June 12-14
- Number of Entries: 2,046
- Total Prize Pool: $2,731,410
- Number of Payouts: 307
- Winning Hand: A♠ 8♦

Final Table
Place	Name	Prize
1st	(United States) Benjamin Ector (1/1)	$406,403
2nd	(United States) Adam Swan	$251,158
3rd	(United States) Nick Palma	$184,730
4th	(United Kingdom) Jean Lhuillier	$137,159
5th	(United States) Divyam Satyarthi	$102,814
6th	(Canada) Santiago Plante	$77,814
7th	(United Kingdom) Matthew Hunt	$59,468
8th	(Germany) Dietrich Fast (0/1)	$45,895
9th	(United Kingdom) Dean Hutchison	$35,773

=== Event #29: $100,000 High Roller No-Limit Hold'em ===
- 3-Day Event: June 12-14
- Number of Entries: 93
- Total Prize Pool: $8,997,750
- Number of Payouts: 14
- Winning Hand: A♦ K♦

Final Table
Place	Name	Prize
1st	(Netherlands) Jans Arends (1/2)	$2,576,729
2nd	(United States) Cary Katz	$1,592,539
3rd	(Spain) Adrian Mateos (0/4)	$1,142,147
4th	(United States) Chance Kornuth (0/3)	$833,854
5th	(United States) Jeremy Ausmus (0/5)	$619,919
6th	(China) Biao Ding	$469,919
7th	(United States) Justin Bonomo (0/3)	$362,279
8th	(China) Ren Lin	$284,979

=== Event #30: $1,500 Limit 2-7 Lowball Triple Draw ===
- 3-Day Event: June 12-14
- Number of Entries: 522
- Total Prize Pool: $696,870
- Number of Payouts: 79
- Winning Hand: 8♥ 6♥ 5♠ 3♣ 2♣

Final Table
Place	Name	Prize
1st	(United States) John Monnette (1/5)	$145,863
2nd	(United States) Christopher Chung	$90,150
3rd	(United Kingdom) Patrick Leonard (0/1)	$60,915
4th	(United States) Josh Damm	$42,030
5th	(United States) James Williams	$29,625
6th	(United States) Ryan Hughes (1/3)	$21,342

=== Event #31: $600 Mixed No-Limit Hold'em/Pot-Limit Omaha Deepstack ===
- 2-Day Event: June 13-14
- Number of Entries: 2,759
- Total Prize Pool: $1,407,090
- Number of Payouts: 414
- Winning Hand: A♥ Q♠ 8♣ 7♦

Final Table
Place	Name	Prize
1st	(United States) Scott Dulaney (1/1)	$194,155
2nd	(United States) Sridhar Sangannagari	$120,004
3rd	(United States) Willie Smith	$89,551
4th	(Norway) Bjorn Gravlien	$67,359
5th	(United States) Zachary Vankeuren	$51,072
6th	(United States) Charles Combs	$39,037
7th	(United States) Michael Holtz (0/1)	$30,081
8th	(United Kingdom) Barny Boatman (0/2)	$23,371

=== Event #32: $3,000 6-Handed No-Limit Hold'em ===
- 2-Day Event: June 13-14
- Number of Entries: 1,241
- Total Prize Pool: $3,313,470
- Number of Payouts: 187
- Winning Hand: K♦ J♦

Final Table
Place	Name	Prize
1st	(United States) Mark Ioli (1/1)	$558,266
2nd	(Colombia) Johann Ibanez	$345,034
3rd	(United Kingdom) Wing Liu	$241,767
4th	(United States) Eshaan Bhalla	$171,874
5th	(France) Julien Sitbon	$123,992
6th	(France) Samy Boujmala	$90,791

=== Event #33: $10,000 Razz Championship ===
- 3-Day Event: June 13-15
- Number of Entries: 102
- Total Prize Pool: $948,600
- Number of Payouts: 19
- Winning Hand: 10-9-7-6-4-3-2

Final Table
Place	Name	Prize
1st	(United States) Jerry Wong (1/1)	$298,682
2nd	(United States) Carlos Chadha	$184,599
3rd	(United States) Michael Moncek (1/2)	$133,177
4th	(United Kingdom) Elior Sion (0/1)	$97,960
5th	(United Kingdom) Talal Shakerchi	$73,495
6th	(United States) John Hennigan* (0/6)	$56,265
7th	(United States) Bryce Yockey (0/1)	$43,970
8th	(Israel) Yuval Bronshtein (0/2)	$35,092

=== Event #34: $1,500 Pot-Limit Omaha ===
- 3-Day Event: June 14-16
- Number of Entries: 1,355
- Total Prize Pool: $1,808,925
- Number of Payouts: 204
- Winning Hand: K♠ J♣ J♦ 4♠

Final Table
Place	Name	Prize
1st	(United States) Sean Troha (1/2)	$298,192
2nd	(United States) Ryan Coon	$184,305
3rd	(United States) Matthew Parry	$134,156
4th	(Norway) Benjamin Voreland	$98,575
5th	(United States) Matthew Beinner	$73,530
6th	(Israel) Naor Slobodskoy	$55,381
7th	(United States) Robert Mizrachi (0/4)	$42,200
8th	(United States) Jason Bullock	$32,537

=== Event #35: $10,000 Secret Bounty No-Limit Hold'em ===
- 3-Day Event: June 14-16
- Number of Entries: 568
- Total Prize Pool: $5,282,400
- Number of Payouts: 86
- Winning Hand: A♠ A♣

Final Table
Place	Name	Prize
1st	(United States) Chris Klodnicki (1/2)	$733,317
2nd	(Mexico) Aram Oganyan	$453,226
3rd	(Israel) Barak Wisbrod (0/1)	$323,181
4th	(United States) Jeremy Ausmus (0/5)	$233,690
5th	(United States) Tracy Nguyen	$171,389
6th	(Mexico) Angel Guillen (0/1)	$127,515
7th	(Austria) Daniel Rezaei	$96,265
8th	(United States) Eric Yanovsky	$73,756
9th	(Netherlands) Johannes Straver	$57,365

=== Event #36: $3,000 Nine Game Mix ===
- 3-Day Event: June 14-16
- Number of Entries: 361
- Total Prize Pool: $963,870
- Number of Payouts: 55
- Winning Hand: A♠ A♣ K♦ 3♣ (Pot-Limit Omaha)

Final Table
Place	Name	Prize
1st	(Japan) Ryutaro Suzuki (1/1)	$221,124
2nd	(United States) Walter Chambers	$136,667
3rd	(United States) Jason Pedigo	$92,860
4th	(Japan) Tamon Nakamura	$64,320
5th	(United States) Ian Steinman (0/1)	$45,434
6th	(Brazil) Renan Bruschi	$32,741
7th	(Sweden) Per Hildebrand	$24,081

=== Event #37: $2,000 No-Limit Hold'em ===
- 3-Day Event: June 15-17
- Number of Entries: 1,962
- Total Prize Pool: $3,492,360
- Number of Payouts: 295
- Winning Hand: 7♣ 6♥

Final Table
Place	Name	Prize
1st	(China) Yuan Li (1/1)	$524,777
2nd	(Canada) Jonathan Camara	$324,355
3rd	(Latvia) Pavel Spirins	$238,129
4th	(United States) Jeremy Joseph	$176,529
5th	(United States) Patrick Truong	$132,153
6th	(United States) Mark Seif (0/2)	$99,916
7th	(United States) James Kraetz	$76,302
8th	(Republic of Ireland) Yuriy Boyko	$58,860
9th	(United States) Frank Weigel	$45,871

=== Event #38: $10,000 Limit 2-7 Lowball Triple Draw Championship ===
- 3-Day Event: June 15-17
- Number of Entries: 130
- Total Prize Pool: $1,209,000
- Number of Payouts: 20
- Winning Hand: 9-7-6-5-A

Final Table
Place	Name	Prize
1st	(United Kingdom) Benny Glaser (1/5)	$311,428
2nd	(Sweden) Oscar Johansson	$192,479
3rd	(Portugal) Michael Rodrigues (1/1)	$139,048
4th	(Finland) Sampo Ryynanen	$101,709
5th	(France) Julien Martini (0/4)	$75,341
6th	(United States) David "Bakes" Baker (0/3)	$56,528

=== Event #39: $1,500 Monster Stack No-Limit Hold'em ===
- 5-Day Event: June 16-20
- Number of Entries: 8,317
- Total Prize Pool: $11,103,195
- Number of Payouts: 1,248
- Winning Hand: 9♣ 7♦

Final Table
Place	Name	Prize
1st	(United States) Braxton Dunaway (1/1)	$1,162,681
2nd	(United States) Colin Robinson	$718,649
3rd	(United States) Jesse Rockowitz (0/1)	$541,376
4th	(France) Loic Dobrigna	$410,493
5th	(United States) Nicholas Gerrity	$313,297
6th	(United States) Joshua Adcock	$240,695
7th	(United States) Joe Cada (0/4)	$186,149
8th	(France) Julien Loire	$144,928
9th	(Bulgaria) Yulian Bogdanov	$113,597

=== Event #40: $250,000 Super High Roller No-Limit Hold'em ===
- 3-Day Event: June 16-18
- Number of Entries: 69
- Total Prize Pool: $17,181,000
- Number of Payouts: 11
- Winning Hand: A♥ 7♦

Final Table
Place	Name	Prize
1st	(United States) Chris Brewer (1/1)	$5,293,556
2nd	(Russia) Artur Martirosian	$3,271,666
3rd	(Czech Republic) Martin Kabrhel (0/2)	$2,279,038
4th	(Hungary) Alex Kulev	$1,632,005
5th	(United States) Chance Kornuth (0/3)	$1,202,318
6th	(United States) Dan Smith (0/1)	$912,022
7th	(United States) David Peters (0/4)	$712,953
8th	(United States) Brandon Steven	$574,899

=== Event #41: $1,500 Big O ===
- 3-Day Event: June 17-19
- Number of Entries: 1,458
- Total Prize Pool: $1,946,430
- Number of Payouts: 219
- Winning Hand: A♥ Q♠ 7♦ 2♦ 2♠

Final Table
Place	Name	Prize
1st	(United States) Scott Abrams (1/1)	$315,203
2nd	(United States) Robert Williamson III (0/1)	$194,814
3rd	(Netherlands) Bjorn Verbakel (0/1)	$142,526
4th	(United States) Victor Ramdin	$105,383
5th	(United States) David Mize	$78,758
6th	(United States) Owais Ahmed (0/1)	$59,501
7th	(United States) William Haffner	$45,447

=== Event #42: $800 8-Handed No-Limit Hold'em Deepstack ===
- 2-Day Event: June 18-19
- Number of Entries: 3,773
- Total Prize Pool: $2,656,192
- Number of Payouts: 566
- Winning Hand: 6♣ 6♠

Final Table
Place	Name	Prize
1st	(China) Qiang Xu (1/1)	$339,377
2nd	(United States) Jason Johnson	$209,728
3rd	(United States) John Ciccarelli	$157,915
4th	(Taiwan) Christian Cheng	$119,736
5th	(United States) Richard Smith	$91,429
6th	(United States) Charles Johnson	$70,310
7th	(France) Dorian Melchers	$54,457
8th	(Israel) Oren Rosen	$42,483

=== Event #43: $50,000 Poker Players Championship ===
- 5-Day Event: June 18-22
- Number of Entries: 99
- Total Prize Pool: $4,727,250
- Number of Payouts: 15
- Winning Hand: 10♦ 8♦ 8♠ 7♥ 4♥ 3♦ 2♠ (Razz)

Final Table
Place	Name	Prize
1st	(United States) Brian Rast (1/6)	$1,324,747
2nd	(United Kingdom) Talal Shakerchi	$818,756
3rd	(United Kingdom) Matthew Ashton (0/1)	$573,679
4th	(Australia) James Obst (0/1)	$411,824
5th	(United States) Kristopher Tong	$303,071
6th	(United States) Phil Ivey* (0/10)	$228,793

=== Event #44: $3,000 No-Limit Hold'em ===
- 4-Day Event: June 19-22
- Number of Entries: 1,735
- Total Prize Pool: $4,632,450
- Number of Payouts: 261
- Winning Hand: A♠ 9♥

Final Table
Place	Name	Prize
1st	(China) Yang Zhang (1/1)	$717,879
2nd	(United States) Aram Oganyan	$443,680
3rd	(Australia) Alex Lynskey	$323,610
4th	(United States) Jon Van Fleet	$238,546
5th	(Canada) Frederic Normand	$177,732
6th	(Bulgaria) Aleks Dimitrov	$133,862
7th	(United States) Shannon Shorr	$101,928
8th	(United States) John Marino	$78,475
9th	(Hungary) Levente Szabo	$61,098

=== Event #45: $1,500 Mixed Omaha Hi-Lo ===
- 3-Day Event: June 19-21
- Number of Entries: 1,091
- Total Prize Pool: $1,456,485
- Number of Payouts: 164
- Winning Hand: Q♣ J♥ 5♠ 2♣ (Pot-Limit Omaha Hi-Lo)

Final Table
Place	Name	Prize
1st	(United States) William Leffingwell (1/1)	$253,651
2nd	(United States) Zhen Cai	$156,773
3rd	(United States) Carlos Guerrero	$109,474
4th	(United States) Joey Couden (0/1)	$77,620
5th	(United States) Shaun Deeb (1/6)	$55,894
6th	(United States) Raj Vohra (0/1)	$40,887
7th	(United States) Benjamin Miner	$30,392

=== Event #46: $500 Freezeout No-Limit Hold'em ===
- 2-Day Event: June 20-21
- Number of Entries: 5,342
- Total Prize Pool: $2,243,640
- Number of Payouts: 802
- Winning Hand: 10♥ 9♦

Final Table
Place	Name	Prize
1st	(United States) Jay Lockett (1/1)	$262,526
2nd	(United States) Jie Fu	$162,207
3rd	(United States) Diego Acquila	$121,085
4th	(United States) Matthew Thom	$91,066
5th	(United States) Muaaz Gani	$69,007
6th	(Mongolia) Byambajav Bandi	$52,690
7th	(United States) Shannon Boone	$40,540
8th	(Australia) David Hirst	$31,433
9th	(Turkey) Ibrahim Tarim	$24,562

=== Event #47: $1,500 H.O.R.S.E. ===
- 3-Day Event: June 20-22
- Number of Entries: 836
- Total Prize Pool: $1,116,060
- Number of Payouts: 126
- Winning Hand: A♠ A♥ (Limit Hold'em)

Final Table
Place	Name	Prize
1st	(Brazil) Yuri Dzivielevski (1/3)	$207,688
2nd	(United States) Randy Ohel (0/1)	$128,356
3rd	(United States) Nghia Le	$89,730
4th	(United States) Frankie O'Dell (0/3)	$63,739
5th	(United States) Stephen Savoy	$46,019
6th	(Norway) Thor Morstoel	$33,779
7th	(Russia) Denis Nesterenko (0/1)	$25,214
8th	(United States) Serhii Popovych	$19,146

=== Event #48: $1,000 Seniors No-Limit Hold'em Championship ===
- 5-Day Event: June 21-25
- Number of Entries: 8,180
- Total Prize Pool: $7,280,200
- Number of Payouts: 1,227
- Winning Hand: A♣ 8♣

Final Table
Place	Name	Prize
1st	(Canada) Lonnie Hallett (1/1)	$765,731
2nd	(United States) Billy Baxter* (0/7)	$473,212
3rd	(United States) Dan Heimiller (0/2)	$356,166
4th	(United States) Shannon Fahey	$269,841
5th	(United States) Gordon Eng	$205,799
6th	(United States) Loren Cloninger	$158,006
7th	(South Africa) Rudolf Fourie	$122,130
8th	(United States) Ron Fetsch	$95,040
9th	(United States) David Stearns	$74,464

=== Event #49: $1,500 Super Turbo Bounty No-Limit Hold'em ===
- 2-Day Event: June 21-22
- Number of Entries: 2,226
- Total Prize Pool: $2,971,710
- Number of Payouts: 334
- Winning Hand: 9♦ 4♦

Final Table
Place	Name	Prize
1st	(United States) Pengfei Wang (0/1)	$270,700
2nd	(United States) Will Linden	$167,339
3rd	(Taiwan) Chen-An Lin	$123,198
4th	(United States) Kenneth Maurer	$91,558
5th	(United States) Michael Burns	$68,693
6th	(United States) Tony Gargano	$52,034
7th	(Argentina) Alejandro Lococo	$39,799
8th	(United States) Danny Scott	$30,740
9th	(United States) Frank Lagodich	$23,978

=== Event #50: $10,000 Pot-Limit Omaha Championship ===
- 4-Day Event: June 21-24
- Number of Entries: 731
- Total Prize Pool: $6,798,300
- Number of Payouts: 110
- Winning Hand: A♠ 4♠ 3♥ 3♦

Final Table
Place	Name	Prize
1st	(United States) Lou Garza (1/1)	$1,309,232
2nd	(United States) Arthur Morris	$809,167
3rd	(Ukraine) Stanislav Halatenko	$570,307
4th	(United States) Travis Pearson	$407,915
5th	(United States) Peng Shan	$296,154
6th	(United States) Sam Soverel (0/1)	$218,297
7th	(Japan) Kosei Ichinose	$163,405
8th	(China) Ren Lin	$124,243

=== Event #51: $1,000 Tag Team No-Limit Hold'em ===
- 3-Day Event: June 22-24
- Number of Entries: 1,282
- Total Prize Pool: $1,140,980
- Number of Payouts: 193
- Winning Hand: K♥ 8♣

Final Table
Place	Name	Prize
1st	(United States) Michael Savakinas (1/1) (United States) Satoshi Tanaka (1/1)	$190,662
2nd	(United States) Tanner Bibat (0/2) (United States) Vincent Moscati	$117,872
3rd	(United States) Jonah Labranche (United States) Dustin Wills	$85,040
4th	(United States) Rickey Evans (United States) Roberto Valdez	$62,090
5th	(United States) Kenneth Gallo (United States) John Ventre	$45,884
6th	(United States) Amber Donatelli (United States) Marcus Stein	$34,326
7th	(United States) Theo Tran (United States) David Williams (0/1)	$26,000
8th	(Mexico) Emmanuel Avila (Mexico) Carlos Inukai	$19,942
9th	(United States) Ronnie Bardah (0/1) (United States) Justin Pechie (0/2)	$15,492

=== Event #52: $2,500 Mixed Triple Draw Lowball ===
- 3-Day Event: June 22-24
- Number of Entries: 353
- Total Prize Pool: $785,425
- Number of Payouts: 53
- Winning Hand: 9♦ 7♣ 6♥ 3♥ 2♦ (2-7 Triple Draw)

Final Table
Place	Name	Prize
1st	(United States) Nick Pupillo (1/1)	$181,978
2nd	(United States) Ryan Moriarty	$112,472
3rd	(United States) Aaron Mermelstein	$74,545
4th	(Japan) Tomomitsu Ono	$50,608
5th	(United States) Hye Park	$35,212
6th	(United States) Brant Hale	$25,126

=== Event #53: $1,500 Millionaire Maker No-Limit Hold'em ===
- 5-Day Event: June 23-27
- Number of Entries: 10,416
- Total Prize Pool: $13,905,360
- Number of Payouts: 1,561
- Winning Hand: K♠ Q♠

Final Table
Place	Name	Prize
1st	(Moldova) Pavel Plesuv (1/1)	$1,201,564
2nd	(France) Florian Ribouchon	$1,003,554
3rd	(United States) Paul Gunness	$650,058
4th	(Germany) Rayo Kniep	$501,182
5th	(Russia) Anton Smirnov	$373,524
6th	(United States) Myles Mullaly	$287,522
7th	(Brazil) Vitor De Souza Coutinho	$222,749
8th	(Hungary) Andras Matrai	$173,683
9th	(Canada) Charles Benoit	$136,302

=== Event #54: $10,000 H.O.R.S.E. Championship ===
- 4-Day Event: June 23-26
- Number of Entries: 185
- Total Prize Pool: $1,720,500
- Number of Payouts: 28
- Winning Hand: Q♠ J♠ J♣ 8♥ A♠ 8♣ 6♠ (Stud Hi-Lo)

Final Table
Place	Name	Prize
1st	(United States) Mike Gorodinsky (1/3)	$422,747
2nd	(Canada) Alex Livingston (0/1)	$261,278
3rd	(United States) Brad Ruben (0/4)	$187,406
4th	(United States) Brian Yoon (1/5)	$136,649
5th	(United States) Scott Seiver (0/4)	$101,319
6th	(United States) Carol Fuchs (0/1)	$76,412
7th	(United States) Christopher Claassen	$58,633
8th	(United States) Esther Taylor	$45,789

=== Event #55: $1,500 Seven Card Stud Hi-Lo 8 or Better ===
- 3-Day Event: June 24-26
- Number of Entries: 566
- Total Prize Pool: $755,610
- Number of Payouts: 85
- Winning Hand: K♣ 6♣ 4♣ 8♦ J♠ J♥ 2♥

Final Table
Place	Name	Prize
1st	(Poland) Marcin Horecki (1/1)	$155,275
2nd	(United States) Mike Matusow (0/4)	$95,957
3rd	(United States) Scott Numoto	$66,950
4th	(United Kingdom) James Cheung	$47,475
5th	(Brazil) Sergio Braga	$34,225
6th	(United States) Michael Estes	$25,089
7th	(United States) Brian Rast (1/6)	$18,709
8th	(United States) Chris George	$14,195

=== Event #56: $500 Salute to Warriors No-Limit Hold'em ===
- 3-Day Event: June 25-27
- Number of Entries: 4,303
- Total Prize Pool: $1,764,230
- Number of Payouts: 646
- Winning Hand: 9♦ 2♥

Final Table
Place	Name	Prize
1st	(United States) Steven Genovese (1/1)	$217,921
2nd	(Canada) Kelly Gall	$134,643
3rd	(United States) William Butcher	$99,961
4th	(United States) Ali Alawadhi	$74,819
5th	(United States) Ryan Stephens	$56,464
6th	(United States) David Elisofon	$42,966
7th	(Italy) Raffaello Locatelli	$32,969
8th	(Morocco) Youssef Hicham	$25,512
9th	(United States) D.J. Alexander (0/1)	$19,910

=== Event #57: $25,000 High Roller Pot-Limit Omaha ===
- 4-Day Event: June 25-28
- Number of Entries: 449
- Total Prize Pool: $10,551,500
- Number of Payouts: 68
- Winning Hand: A♣ K♠ Q♣ 10♠

Final Table
Place	Name	Prize
1st	(Hong Kong) Ka Kwan Lau (1/1)	$2,294,756
2nd	(Spain) Sergio Martinez Gonzalez	$1,418,270
3rd	(United States) Andjelko Andrejevic	$989,464
4th	(United States) Roger Teska	$701,522
5th	(United States) Mads Aamot	$505,588
6th	(China) Quan Zhou	$370,498
7th	(United States) Firas Sadou	$276,141
8th	(United States) Jeremy Ausmus (1/6)	$209,392

=== Event #58: $3,000 6-Handed Limit Hold'em ===
- 3-Day Event: June 25-27
- Number of Entries: 263
- Total Prize Pool: $702,210
- Number of Payouts: 40
- Winning Hand: 5♣ 3♣

Final Table
Place	Name	Prize
1st	(United States) Jason Daly (1/1)	$165,250
2nd	(United States) Brent Mutter	$102,132
3rd	(United States) Nick Pupillo (1/1)	$72,681
4th	(United States) Milfred Sageer	$52,056
5th	(United States) Daniel Young	$37,526
6th	(United States) Mavrick Yoo	$27,228

=== Event #59: $3,000 Freezeout No-Limit Hold'em ===
- 3-Day Event: June 26-28
- Number of Entries: 1,598
- Total Prize Pool: $4,266,660
- Number of Payouts: 240
- Winning Hand: A♦ 2♣

Final Table
Place	Name	Prize
1st	(Germany) Robert Schulz (1/1)	$675,275
2nd	(France) Julien Sitbon	$417,338
3rd	(Philippines) James Mendoza	$303,884
4th	(Israel) Barak Wisbrod (0/1)	$223,657
5th	(Italy) Dario Sammartino	$166,404
6th	(United Kingdom) Robert Burlacu	$125,170
7th	(Ukraine) Nazar Buhaiov	$95,203
8th	(India) Kunal Patni	$73,225
9th	(United States) Jesse Lonis (0/1)	$56,963

=== Event #60: $1,500 No-Limit 2-7 Lowball Draw ===
- 3-Day Event: June 26-28
- Number of Entries: 548
- Total Prize Pool: $731,580
- Number of Payouts: 83
- Winning Hand: 10-8-5-4-3

Final Table
Place	Name	Prize
1st	(United States) Jason Mercier (1/6)	$151,276
2nd	(Canada) Mike Watson	$93,495
3rd	(United States) Brad Ruben (0/4)	$63,505
4th	(United States) Jon Turner	$44,002
5th	(United States) Erik Seidel (0/9)	$31,114
6th	(United Kingdom) Richard Ashby (0/1)	$22,461
7th	(United States) Jonathan Glendinning	$16,562

=== Event #61: $1,000 Super Seniors No-Limit Hold'em ===
- 4-Day Event: June 27-30
- Number of Entries: 3,121
- Total Prize Pool: $2,777,690
- Number of Payouts: 468
- Winning Hand: 9♦ 9♠

Final Table
Place	Name	Prize
1st	(Austria) Klaus Ilk (1/1)	$371,603
2nd	(United States) Ronald Lane	$229,685
3rd	(United States) Farhad Davoudzadeh	$172,058
4th	(United States) Ronald Swain	$129,812
5th	(United States) Kevin Danko	$98,644
6th	(Argentina) Federico Trujillo	$75,503
7th	(United States) Arnon Graham	$58,213
8th	(United States) Rassoul Malboubi	$45,213
9th	(United States) Richard Wallace	$35,377

=== Event #62: $1,500 Mixed No-Limit Hold'em/Pot-Limit Omaha ===
- 3-Day Event: June 27-29
- Number of Entries: 2,076
- Total Prize Pool: $2,771,460
- Number of Payouts: 312
- Winning Hand: Q♣ J♣ 6♠ 4♦

Final Table
Place	Name	Prize
1st	(United States) David Simon (1/1)	$410,659
2nd	(United States) David Prociak (0/1)	$253,821
3rd	(United States) Eric Pfenning	$185,630
4th	(Israel) Eran Carmi	$137,058
5th	(Israel) Tsuf Saltsberg	$102,173
6th	(United States) Robert Mizrachi (0/4)	$76,910
7th	(United States) Upeshka De Silva (0/3)	$58,464
8th	(China) Guofeng Wang	$44,884

=== Event #63: $10,000 Seven Card Stud Hi-Lo 8 or Better Championship ===
- 3-Day Event: June 27-29
- Number of Entries: 141
- Total Prize Pool: $1,311,300
- Number of Payouts: 22
- Winning Hand: A♣ 7♣ 9♣ 4♠ A♠ 3♦ J♠

Final Table
Place	Name	Prize
1st	(United States) Ryan Miller (1/1)	$344,677
2nd	(United States) Bryn Kenney (0/1)	$213,027
3rd	(United States) Maximilian Schindler	$149,981
4th	(Argentina) Andres Korn (0/1)	$107,824
5th	(United States) David Rheem	$79,189
6th	(United States) Eddie Blumenthal	$59,441
7th	(China) Yong Wang	$45,624
8th	(Portugal) Joao Vieira (0/2)	$35,826

=== Event #64: $600 Deepstack Championship No-Limit Hold'em ===
- 4-Day Event: June 28-July 1
- Number of Entries: 4,303
- Total Prize Pool: $2,194,530
- Number of Payouts: 645
- Winning Hand: 9♦ 6♦

Final Table
Place	Name	Prize
1st	(Canada) David Guay (1/1)	$270,972
2nd	(United States) John Taylor	$167,444
3rd	(United States) Steven Stolzenfeld	$124,821
4th	(France) Jonathan Fhima	$93,773
5th	(France) Romain Kowalczyk	$71,002
6th	(France) Gaetan Balleur	$54,186
7th	(Australia) David Sebesfi	$41,684
8th	(United Kingdom) Paul Hindmarch	$32,324
9th	(South Africa) Ahmed Karrim	$25,270

=== Event #65: $5,000 6-Handed No-Limit Hold'em ===
- 4-Day Event: June 28-July 1
- Number of Entries: 1,199
- Total Prize Pool: $5,515,400
- Number of Payouts: 180
- Winning Hand: A♦ K♦

Final Table
Place	Name	Prize
1st	(China) Weiran Pu (1/1)	$938,244
2nd	(Hungary) Norbert Szecsi (0/3)	$579,892
3rd	(United States) Tyler Cornell (0/1)	$407,040
4th	(Brazil) Pedro Garagnani	$289,819
5th	(Australia) Angelina Rich	$209,366
6th	(Brazil) Vitor Dzivielevski	$153,485

=== Event #66: $1,500 Pot-Limit Omaha Hi-Lo 8 or Better ===
- 3-Day Event: June 28-30
- Number of Entries: 1,125
- Total Prize Pool: $1,501,875
- Number of Payouts: 169
- Winning Hand: A♦ Q♠ 8♠ 3♠

Final Table
Place	Name	Prize
1st	(United States) William Kopp (1/1)	$259,549
2nd	(Portugal) Michael Rodrigues (1/1)	$160,418
3rd	(United States) Mike Linster	$113,991
4th	(United States) Sterling Savill	$82,104
5th	(United States) Joseph McCarthy	$59,953
6th	(United States) Loni Hui (0/2)	$44,391
7th	(United States) John Goyette	$33,335
8th	(United States) Anthony Zinno (0/4)	$25,394

=== Event #67: $1,000 Ladies No-Limit Hold'em Championship ===
- 4-Day Event: June 29-July 2
- Number of Entries: 1,295
- Total Prize Pool: $1,152,550
- Number of Payouts: 195
- Winning Hand: 10♠ 3♠

Final Table
Place	Name	Prize
1st	(United States) Tamar Abraham (1/1)	$192,167
2nd	(Japan) Shiina Okamoto	$118,768
3rd	(United States) Nam Nguyen	$85,756
4th	(United States) Suzanne Malavet	$62,658
5th	(Israel) Mary Dvorkin	$46,333
6th	(United States) Tara Cain	$34,679
7th	(Cyprus) Chrysi Phiniotis	$26,277
8th	(United States) Jennifer Wu	$20,160
9th	(United States) Kristie Ogilvie	$15,662

=== Event #68: $1,000 Super Turbo Bounty No-Limit Hold'em ===
- 1-Day Event: June 29
- Number of Entries: 2,824
- Total Prize Pool: $2,513,360
- Number of Payouts: 424
- Winning Hand: A♦ 5♦

Final Table
Place	Name	Prize
1st	(Brazil) Gabriel Schroeder (1/1)	$228,632
2nd	(United States) Joel Wertheimer	$141,298
3rd	(Republic of Ireland) Andy Black	$105,337
4th	(United States) Elson Lima	$79,142
5th	(United States) Jordan Jayne	$59,929
6th	(United States) Daniel Lowery	$45,741
7th	(Portugal) Jose Andrade	$35,191
8th	(United States) Jonathan Akiba	$27,293
9th	(Trinidad and Tobago) Ryan Goindoo	$21,340

=== Event #69: $10,000 No-Limit 2-7 Lowball Draw Championship ===
- 3-Day Event: June 29-July 1
- Number of Entries: 154
- Total Prize Pool: $1,432,200
- Number of Payouts: 24
- Winning Hand: 10-8-6-4-2

Final Table
Place	Name	Prize
1st	(United States) Chris Brewer (2/2)	$367,599
2nd	(Canada) Alex Livingston (0/1)	$227,193
3rd	(United States) David "ODB" Baker (1/3)	$158,057
4th	(United States) Christopher Vitch (0/2)	$112,402
5th	(Canada) Daniel Negreanu (0/6)	$81,751
6th	(Brazil) Yuri Dzivielevski (1/3)	$60,840
7th	(United States) Young Ko	$46,356

=== Event #70: $400 Colossus No-Limit Hold'em ===
- 4-Day Event: June 30-July 3
- Number of Entries: 15,894
- Total Prize Pool: $5,245,020
- Number of Payouts: 2,369
- Winning Hand: 7♦ 4♦

Final Table
Place	Name	Prize
1st	(Israel) Moshe Refaelowitz (1/1)	$501,120
2nd	(South Korea) Dae Woong Song	$300,410
3rd	(Taiwan) Pete Chen (0/1)	$216,320
4th	(United States) Darrick Arreola	$165,180
5th	(United States) David Danlag	$126,830
6th	(Mexico) Jose Orozcogomez	$100,130
7th	(United States) Nikhil Nair	$76,130
8th	(United States) William Ackerman	$59,510
9th	(United States) Colin Robinson	$46,800

=== Event #71: $50,000 High Roller Pot-Limit Omaha ===
- 3-Day Event: June 30-July 2
- Number of Entries: 200
- Total Prize Pool: $9,550,000
- Number of Payouts: 30
- Winning Hand: J♥ 10♦ 7♣ 4♠

Final Table
Place	Name	Prize
1st	(United States) Jesse Lonis (1/2)	$2,303,017
2nd	(United States) Tyler Smith (0/1)	$1,423,372
3rd	(Germany) Jonas Kronwitter	$1,037,441
4th	(United States) Danny Hannawa	$764,950
5th	(United States) Adam Hendrix	$570,671
6th	(United Kingdom) James Park	$430,806
7th	(United States) Isaac Haxton (1/1)	$329,142
8th	(Finland) Elias Harala	$254,538

=== Event #72: $10,000 Super Turbo Bounty No-Limit Hold'em ===
- 1-Day Event: July 1
- Number of Entries: 642
- Total Prize Pool: $5,970,600
- Number of Payouts: 97
- Winning Hand: 8♣ 4♥

Final Table
Place	Name	Prize
1st	(United States) Phil Hellmuth (1/17)	$803,818
2nd	(United States) Justin Zaki	$496,801
3rd	(Austria) Tom Kunze	$349,737
4th	(Brazil) Kelvin Kerber	$249,876
5th	(United States) Chris Savage	$181,230
6th	(United States) Phil Ivey (0/10)	$133,461
7th	(United States) Brandon Steven	$99,817
8th	(United Kingdom) Marc Foggin	$75,837

=== Event #73: $2,500 Mixed Big Bet Event ===
- 3-Day Event: July 1-3
- Number of Entries: 376
- Total Prize Pool: $836,600
- Number of Payouts: 57
- Winning Hand: A♥ K♣ Q♥ 6♣ 4♣ (Big O)

Final Table
Place	Name	Prize
1st	(Argentina) Julio Belluscio (1/1)	$190,240
2nd	(Costa Rica) Federico Quevedo	$117,577
3rd	(United Kingdom) Benny Glaser (1/5)	$78,939
4th	(Poland) Tomasz Gluszko	$54,118
5th	(United States) Erick Lindgren (0/2)	$37,901
6th	(United States) Hye Park	$27,130

=== Event #74: $1,000 Mini Main Event No-Limit Hold'em ===
- 3-Day Event: July 2-4
- Number of Entries: 5,257
- Total Prize Pool: $4,678,730
- Number of Payouts: 789
- Winning Hand: 4♦ 3♥

Final Table
Place	Name	Prize
1st	(United States) Bradley Gafford (1/1)	$549,555
2nd	(United States) Josh Reichard	$339,646
3rd	(United States) Jeremy Oleon	$255,215
4th	(United States) Jennifer Abad	$193,103
5th	(United States) Oliver Berens	$147,129
6th	(Romania) Marius Iftimia	$112,889
7th	(Canada) Mason St. Martin	$87,232
8th	(Moldova) Egor Procop	$67,888
9th	(United States) Igor Hot	$53,213

=== Event #75: $10,000 Pot-Limit Omaha Hi-Lo 8 or Better Championship ===
- 4-Day Event: July 2-5
- Number of Entries: 277
- Total Prize Pool: $2,576,100
- Number of Payouts: 42
- Winning Hand: J♥ 6♦ 5♠ 4♣

Final Table
Place	Name	Prize
1st	(Australia) Hassan Kamel (1/1)	$598,613
2nd	(United States) Ryan Hoenig	$369,972
3rd	(United States) John Holley	$265,156
4th	(Russia) Anton Smirnov	$192,562
5th	(United States) Dylan Weisman (0/1)	$141,727
6th	(United States) Stephen Deutsch	$105,737
7th	(United States) Long Tran	$79,979
8th	(Poland) Dzmitry Urbanovich	$61,346

=== Event #76: $10,000 Main Event No-Limit Hold'em World Championship ===
- 14-Day Event: July 3-17
- Number of Entries: 10,043
- Total Prize Pool: $93,399,900
- Number of Payouts: 1,507
- Winning Hand: K♣ J♦

Final Table
Place	Name	Prize
1st	(United States) Daniel Weinman (1/2)	$12,100,000
2nd	(United States) Steven Jones	$6,500,000
3rd	(United States) Adam Walton	$4,000,000
4th	(Germany) Jan-Peter Jachtmann (0/1)	$3,000,000
5th	(Ukraine) Ruslan Prydryk	$2,400,000
6th	(United Kingdom) Dean Hutchison	$1,850,000
7th	(United Kingdom) Toby Lewis	$1,425,000
8th	(Spain) Juan Maceiras	$1,125,000
9th	(Italy) Daniel Holzner	$900,000

=== Event #77: $777 Lucky 7's No-Limit Hold'em ===
- 5-Day Event: July 7-11
- Number of Entries: 7,300
- Total Prize Pool: $4,991,448
- Number of Payouts: 1,043
- Winning Hand: K♥ Q♠

Final Table
Place	Name	Prize
1st	(United States) Shawn Daniels (1/1)	$777,777
2nd	(France) Julien Montois	$400,777
3rd	(Hungary) Istvan Briski	$226,777
4th	(United States) Anthony Scarborough	$168,777
5th	(Canada) Charles La Boissonniere	$125,777
6th	(United States) Alexander Cole-Gardner	$95,777
7th	(United States) Yizhou Huang	$72,777

=== Event #78: $1,500 Bounty Pot-Limit Omaha ===
- 3-Day Event: July 7-9
- Number of Entries: 1,214
- Total Prize Pool: $1,620,690
- Number of Payouts: 183
- Winning Hand: 9♥ 8♣ 5♥ 4♥

Final Table
Place	Name	Prize
1st	(United States) Thomas Skaggs (1/1)	$171,742
2nd	(Netherlands) David Hu	$106,138
3rd	(United States) Satar Al-Sadoun	$75,761
4th	(United States) Paul DeGiulio	$54,775
5th	(Japan) Yusuke Tanaka	$40,119
6th	(United States) Vincent Moscati	$29,773
7th	(United States) Paul Spitzberg	$22,392
8th	(United States) Noah Schwartz (0/1)	$17,069

=== Event #79: $2,500 No-Limit Hold'em ===
- 3-Day Event: July 10-12
- Number of Entries: 2,068
- Total Prize Pool: $4,601,300
- Number of Payouts: 311
- Winning Hand: K♠ K♣

Final Table
Place	Name	Prize
1st	(Spain) Samuel Bernabeu (1/1)	$682,436
2nd	(United States) James Anderson (0/1)	$421,761
3rd	(Italy) Zlatin Penev	$310,528
4th	(United States) Seth Davies	$230,772
5th	(Brazil) Diego Vaz Sorgatto	$173,121
6th	(United States) Justin Kindred	$131,111
7th	(Spain) Ramon Fernandez	$100,252
8th	(United States) Derek Normand	$77,401
9th	(United States) Daniel Schill	$60,346

=== Event #80: $25,000 High Roller H.O.R.S.E. ===
- 4-Day Event: July 10-13
- Number of Entries: 112
- Total Prize Pool: $2,632,000
- Number of Payouts: 17
- Winning Hand: A♠ Q♦ 4♦ 2♦ (Omaha Hi-Lo 8 or Better)

Final Table
Place	Name	Prize
1st	(United States) Josh Arieh (2/6)	$711,313
2nd	(United States) Dan Heimiller (0/2)	$439,662
3rd	(China) Yingui Li	$319,906
4th	(Portugal) Joao Vieira (0/2)	$236,163
5th	(United States) Mike Matusow (0/4)	$176,904
6th	(United States) John Hennigan (0/6)	$134,491
7th	(Germany) Johannes Becker (0/1)	$103,795
8th	(United States) Scott Seiver (0/4)	$81,337

=== Event #81: $600 Ultra Stack No-Limit Hold'em ===
- 4-Day Event: July 11-14
- Number of Entries: 7,207
- Total Prize Pool: $3,675,570
- Number of Payouts: 1,060
- Winning Hand: A♣ Q♠

Final Table
Place	Name	Prize
1st	(United States) Joseph Roh (1/1)	$401,250
2nd	(United States) Denny Lee	$250,120
3rd	(United States) John Fagg	$184,720
4th	(United States) Peyton Ethridge	$139,360
5th	(United States) William Fisher	$105,890
6th	(United States) Logan Moon	$81,030
7th	(South Korea) Min-Sung Lee	$62,450
8th	(United States) Lucas Tae	$48,480
9th	(United States) Schuyler Thornton	$37,910

=== Event #82: $3,000 6-Handed Pot-Limit Omaha ===
- 3-Day Event: July 11-13
- Number of Entries: 1,013
- Total Prize Pool: $2,704,710
- Number of Payouts: 152
- Winning Hand: 7♠ 5♦ 4♦ 3♣

Final Table
Place	Name	Prize
1st	(United States) Matthew Parry (1/1)	$480,122
2nd	(United States) Dustin Goldklang	$296,746
3rd	(United States) Ian Matakis (1/1)	$205,696
4th	(United States) Cuba Levenberry	$144,890
5th	(United States) Lawrence Wayne	$103,738
6th	(United States) Connor Drinan (0/2)	$75,517

=== Event #83: $1,500 Short Deck No-Limit Hold'em ===
- 3-Day Event: July 12-14
- Number of Entries: 363
- Total Prize Pool: $484,605
- Number of Payouts: 55
- Winning Hand: Q♥ Q♣

Final Table
Place	Name	Prize
1st	(Vietnam) Thai Ha (1/1)	$111,170
2nd	(United States) David Prociak (0/1)	$68,712
3rd	(Malaysia) Waikiat Lee	$45,866
4th	(United States) Robert James	$31,307
5th	(United States) Ryan Laplante (0/1)	$21,863
6th	(Israel) Moshe Alosh	$15,629

=== Event #84: $50,000 High Roller No-Limit Hold'em ===
- 3-Day Event: July 12-14
- Number of Entries: 176
- Total Prize Pool: $8,404,000
- Number of Payouts: 27
- Winning Hand: A♣ 9♣

Final Table
Place	Name	Prize
1st	(Bulgaria) Alex Kulev (1/1)	$2,087,073
2nd	(Hungary) Gergely Kulcsar	$1,289,909
3rd	(United States) Jake Schindler (0/1)	$957,491
4th	(Germany) Daniel Smiljkovic	$713,413
5th	(Germany) Koray Aldemir (0/1)	$533,561
6th	(Netherlands) Johannes Straver	$400,562
7th	(United States) Brandon Wittmeyer (0/1)	$301,859
8th	(Israel) Moshe Refaelowitz (1/1)	$228,347

=== Event #85: $1,500 Shootout No-Limit Hold'em ===
- 3-Day Event: July 13-15
- Number of Entries: 987
- Total Prize Pool: $1,317,645
- Number of Payouts: 100
- Winning Hand: 9♣ 7♥

Final Table
Place	Name	Prize
1st	(United States) Faraz Jaka (1/1)	$237,367
2nd	(United States) Michael Finstein	$146,686
3rd	(Ukraine) Olga Iermolcheva	$109,780
4th	(United States) Ao Chen	$82,954
5th	(Brazil) Yuri Dzivielevski (1/3)	$63,295
6th	(France) Matteo Cavelier	$48,772
7th	(China) Mo Zhou	$37,955
8th	(United States) Adam Friedman (0/5)	$29,834
9th	(United States) Allan Mello	$23,689
10th	(United States) Edward Mroczkowski	$19,003

=== Event #86: $1,979 Poker Hall of Fame Bounty No-Limit Hold'em ===
- 2-Day Event: July 13-14
- Number of Entries: 1,417
- Total Prize Pool: $2,495,776
- Number of Payouts: 213
- Winning Hand: A♠ 8♦

Final Table
Place	Name	Prize
1st	(Peru) Diego Ventura (1/1)	$402,054
2nd	(United States) Thomas Kysar	$248,502
3rd	(Canada) Jason James	$179,593
4th	(United States) Francis Anderson	$131,324
5th	(Mexico) Jose Nadal	$97,174
6th	(United States) Louie Torres	$72,773
7th	(Sweden) Martin Jacobson (0/1)	$55,165
8th	(Israel) Leonid Yanovski	$42,336
9th	(Canada) Jimmy Setna	$32,897

=== Event #87: $2,500 Mixed ===
- 3-Day Event: July 13-15
- Number of Entries: 460
- Total Prize Pool: $1,023,500
- Number of Payouts: 69
- Winning Hand: A♣ J♠ 6♦ 3♦

Final Table
Place	Name	Prize
1st	(Canada) Bradley Smith (1/1)	$221,733
2nd	(United States) Nghia Le	$137,039
3rd	(United States) Nick Pupillo (1/1)	$94,681
4th	(United States) Omar Mehmood	$66,605
5th	(United States) Tim Frazin	$47,721
6th	(United States) Jonah Seewald	$34,836
7th	(United Kingdom) Philip Sternheimer	$25,919
8th	(Israel) Yuval Bronshtein (0/2)	$19,662

=== Event #88: $1,500 The Closer No-Limit Hold'em ===
- 3-Day Event: July 14-16
- Number of Entries: 3,531
- Total Prize Pool: $4,713,885
- Number of Payouts: 524
- Winning Hand: Q♣ 2♣

Final Table
Place	Name	Prize
1st	(United States) Pierre Shum (1/1)	$606,810
2nd	(United States) Peter Nigh	$376,420
3rd	(United States) Roongsak Griffeth	$284,030
4th	(United States) Jack Duong (0/1)	$215,650
5th	(Canada) Amirpasha Emami	$164,750
6th	(Romania) Mihai Niste	$126,660
7th	(United States) Jixue Yin	$100,120
8th	(United States) Peter Hengsakul	$76,300
9th	(United States) Sanjeev Kapoor	$59,790

=== Event #89: $1,000 Flip & Go No-Limit Hold'em ===
- 2-Day Event: July 14-15
- Number of Entries: 1,022
- Total Prize Pool: $909,580
- Number of Payouts: 128
- Winning Hand: A♥ K♥

Final Table
Place	Name	Prize
1st	(United States) Dong Meng (1/1)	$160,490
2nd	(China) Wesley Fei	$100,120
3rd	(Canada) Brady Hinnegan	$71,700
4th	(United States) Kevin Eyster (0/1)	$52,280
5th	(Taiwan) Pete Chen (0/1)	$38,600
6th	(United States) David Williams (0/1)	$28,870
7th	(United States) Eric Wasserson	$21,880
8th	(United States) John Gonzalez	$16,790
9th	(United States) Andrew Sandomire	$13,070

=== Event #90: $10,000 6-Handed No-Limit Hold'em Championship ===
- 3-Day Event: July 14-16
- Number of Entries: 550
- Total Prize Pool: $5,115,000
- Number of Payouts: 83
- Winning Hand: 4♦ 3♦

Final Table
Place	Name	Prize
1st	(France) Alexandre Reard (1/2)	$1,057,663
2nd	(United Kingdom) Stephen Chidwick (0/1)	$653,688
3rd	(United States) Andrew Kelsall (0/1)	$443,259
4th	(United States) Justin Liberto (0/1)	$306,555
5th	(United States) Elijah Berg	$216,319
6th	(United States) Eric Baldwin (0/2)	$155,809

=== Event #91: $3,000 H.O.R.S.E. ===
- 3-Day Event: July 15-17
- Number of Entries: 331
- Total Prize Pool: $883,770
- Number of Payouts: 50
- Winning Hand: J♦ 2♦ (Limit Hold'em)

Final Table
Place	Name	Prize
1st	(United States) Ryan Miller (2/2)	$208,460
2nd	(United States) Leonard August	$128,835
3rd	(United States) Calvin Anderson (0/3)	$89,169
4th	(United States) Barbara Enright (0/3)	$62,783
5th	(United States) Andrew Yeh (0/1)	$44,983
6th	(United States) Noah Bronstein	$32,807
7th	(United States) Kevin Gerhart (0/4)	$24,363
8th	(United States) Todd Brunson (0/1)	$18,429

=== Event #92: $1,000 Freezeout No-Limit Hold'em ===
- 2-Day Event: July 16-17
- Number of Entries: 1,710
- Total Prize Pool: $1,521,900
- Number of Payouts: 257
- Winning Hand: K♦ 5♠

Final Table
Place	Name	Prize
1st	(Canada) Kang Hyun Lee (1/1)	$236,741
2nd	(United States) Eric Mizrachi	$146,335
3rd	(United States) Ivan Millian	$106,602
4th	(United States) Abdul Almagableh	$78,495
5th	(United States) Kane Kalas	$58,429
6th	(United States) Asher Conniff	$43,972
7th	(Brazil) Ricardo Nakamura	$33,461
8th	(Canada) Vanessa Kade	$25,749
9th	(Brazil) Eider Cruz	$20,041

=== Event #93: $10,000 Short Deck No-Limit Hold'em ===
- 3-Day Event: July 16-18
- Number of Entries: 106
- Total Prize Pool: $985,800
- Number of Payouts: 16
- Winning Hand: K♦ K♠

Final Table
Place	Name	Prize
1st	(Faroe Islands) Martin Nielsen (1/1)	$270,760
2nd	(United States) Hongwei Yu	$167,340
3rd	(United States) Ivan Ermin	$118,037
4th	(United States) Eric Wasserson	$85,124
5th	(United States) John Juanda (0/5)	$62,793
6th	(Japan) Nobuaki Sasaki	$47,406

=== Event #94: $5,000 8-Handed No-Limit Hold'em ===
- 2-Day Event: July 17-18
- Number of Entries: 813
- Total Prize Pool: $3,739,800
- Number of Payouts: 122
- Winning Hand: A♣ K♣

Final Table
Place	Name	Prize
1st	(United States) Alex Keating (1/1)	$701,688
2nd	(China) Guoliang Wei (0/1)	$433,662
3rd	(Japan) Nozomu Shimizu	$305,474
4th	(Canada) Marcello Del Grosso	$218,402
5th	(Greece) Alexandros Kolonias (0/1)	$158,525
6th	(United States) Josh Reichard	$116,842
7th	(United States) Christian Harder	$87,470
8th	(United States) Jason Hickey	$66,526

=== Event #95: $1,000 Super Turbo No-Limit Hold'em ===
- 1-Day Event: July 18
- Number of Entries: 1,482
- Total Prize Pool: $1,318,980
- Number of Payouts: 223
- Winning Hand: A♦ 6♠

Final Table
Place	Name	Prize
1st	(United States) Paul Berger (1/1)	$212,645
2nd	(Brazil) Yuri Dzivielevski (1/3)	$131,408
3rd	(Canada) Santiago Plante	$95,195
4th	(Portugal) Miguel Cardoso	$69,751
5th	(United States) Michael Liang	$51,700
6th	(United States) Kafton Ramsamooj	$38,769
7th	(Hong Kong) Hon Cheong Lee	$29,417
8th	(United States) Alexander Zhang	$22,589
9th	(United States) Tai Cao	$17,556
