= 2023 World Series of Poker =

Series of poker tournaments

- Location: Horseshoe Las Vegas and Paris Las Vegas, Las Vegas, Nevada
- Dates: May 30 – July 17

Champion
- (United States) Daniel Weinman

The 2023 World Series of Poker was the 54th edition of the World Series of Poker (WSOP), a series of poker tournaments. It took place from May 30 – July 17 at the Horseshoe Las Vegas and Paris Las Vegas in Las Vegas, Nevada.

The series featured 95 bracelet events, plus another 20 online bracelet events. Events included the $1,000 Mystery Millions beginning on May 31, with mystery bounties of up to $1 million. There were also Badugi and Big O events for the first time, as well as a $300 Gladiators of Poker event. The Tournament of Champions also returned, this time near the beginning of the series.

The $10,000 Main Event began on July 3 with the first of four starting flights. The final table was held over two days on July 16–17.

== Event schedule ==
Key: (bracelets won in 2023/bracelets won in career)

High stakes event ($10,000+ buy-in).
No points awarded towards Player of the Year.
Online event.

#	Event	Entrants	Winner	Prize	Runner-up	Results
1	$500 Casino Employees No-Limit Hold'em	1,015	(United States) Peter Thai (1/1)	$75,535	(United States) James Urbanic	Results
2	$25,000 High Roller Six Handed No-Limit Hold'em	207	(Switzerland) Alexandre Vuilleumier (1/1)	$1,215,864	(United States) Chance Kornuth (0/3)	Results
3	$1,000 Mystery Millions No-Limit Hold'em	18,188	(United States) Tyler Brown (1/1)	$1,000,000	(United States) Guang Chen	Results
4	WSOP Tournament of Champions	741	(United States) Ronnie Day (1/1)	$200,000	(United States) Brent Gregory	Results
5	$1,500 Dealers Choice 6-Handed	456	(United States) Chad Eveslage (1/2)	$131,879	(United States) Andrew Kelsall (0/1)	Results
6	$5,000 Mixed No-Limit Hold'em/Pot-Limit Omaha	568	(United States) Michael Moncek (1/2)	$534,499	(Switzerland) Fernando Habegger	Results
7	$1,500 Limit Hold'em	527	(Ukraine) Vadim Shlez (1/1)	$146,835	(Ukraine) Rostyslav Sabishchenko	Results
o1	$333 No-Limit Hold'em Triple Treys Summer Tip Off	1,330	(United States) Cody Bell (1/1)	$87,665	(United States) Douglas May	
8	$25,000 Heads-Up No-Limit Hold'em Championship	64	(Canada) Chanracy Khun (1/1)	$507,020	(United States) Doug Polk (0/3)	Results
9	$1,500 Seven Card Stud	360	(United States) Nick Schulman (1/4)	$110,800	(United States) Andrew Hasdal	Results
10	$10,000 Dealers Choice 6-Handed Championship	130	(United States) Chad Eveslage (2/3)	$311,428	(United States) Dutch Boyd (0/3)	Results
11	$600 No-Limit Hold'em Deepstack	6,085	(United States) Kenneth O'Donnell (1/1)	$351,098	(Colombia) Jefferson Guerrero	Results
12	$5,000 Freezeout No-Limit Hold'em 8-Handed	735	(United States) Jeremy Eyer (1/1)	$649,550	(Brazil) Felipe Ramos	Results
o2	$500 No-Limit Hold'em Bankroll Builder	1,253	(United States) Ian Matakis (1/1)	$120,686	(United States) Baruch Forst	
o3	$1,000 No-Limit Hold'em Deepstack	688	(United States) Ryan Hughes (1/3)	$145,059	(United States) Shaun Deeb (0/5)	
13	$600 Pot-Limit Omaha Deepstack	3,200	(United States) Joseph Altomonte (1/1)	$217,102	(United States) Michael Holmes	Results
14	$10,000 Seven Card Stud Championship	130	(United States) Brian Yoon (1/5)	$311,433	(United States) Dan Shak	Results
15	$1,500 6-Handed No-Limit Hold'em	2,454	(Brazil) Rafael Reis (1/1)	$465,501	(Spain) Daniel Barriocanal	Results
16	$25,000 High Roller No-Limit Hold'em 8-Handed	301	(United States) Isaac Haxton (1/1)	$1,698,215	(United Kingdom) Ryan O'Donnell	Results
17	$1,500 Omaha Hi-Lo 8 or Better	1,143	(United States) Jim Collopy (1/3)	$262,542	(United States) Nick Kost (0/1)	Results
o4	$600 No-Limit Hold'em Ultra Deepstack	1,656	(United States) Danny Wong (1/1)	$130,648	(United States) Eshaan Bhalla	
18	$300 Gladiators of Poker No-Limit Hold'em	23,088	(United States) Jason Simon (1/1)	$499,852	(United States) Eric Trexler	Results
19	$2,500 Freezeout No-Limit Hold'em	1,139	(Bulgaria) Valentino Konakchiev (1/1)	$435,924	(Argentina) Andres Korn (0/1)	Results
20	$1,500 Badugi	516	(Portugal) Michael Rodrigues (1/1)	$144,678	(China) Yingui Li	Results
21	$1,000 Pot-Limit Omaha 8-Handed	2,017	(Canada) Stephen Nahm (1/1)	$267,991	(United States) Kevin Rand	Results
22	$10,000 Limit Hold'em Championship	134	(United States) Josh Arieh (1/5)	$316,226	(Canada) Dan Idema (0/3)	Results
23	$50,000 High Roller No-Limit Hold'em	124	(Germany) Leon Sturm (1/1)	$1,546,024	(United States) Bill Klein	Results
24	$1,500 Razz	556	(United States) David "ODB" Baker (1/3)	$152,991	(United States) Justin Liberto (0/1)	Results
25	$10,000 Omaha Hi-Lo 8 or Better Championship	212	(United States) Ben Lamb (1/2)	$492,795	(United States) James Chen	Results
26	$800 No-Limit Hold'em Deepstack	4,747	(China) Renji Mao (1/1)	$402,588	(United States) Matthew Elsby (0/1)	Results
27	$1,500 Eight Game Mix 6-Handed	789	(United States) Shaun Deeb (1/6)	$198,854	(Brazil) Aloísio Dourado	Results
o5	$400 No-Limit Hold'em 8-Max	1,488	(United States) Gary Belyalovsky (1/1)	$121,854	(United States) Joseph Hebert	
28	$1,500 Freezeout No-Limit Hold'em	2,046	(United States) Benjamin Ector (1/1)	$406,403	(United States) Adam Swan	Results
29	$100,000 High Roller No-Limit Hold'em	93	(Netherlands) Jans Arends (1/2)	$2,576,729	(United States) Cary Katz	Results
30	$1,500 Limit 2–7 Lowball Triple Draw	522	(United States) John Monnette (1/5)	$145,846	(United States) Christopher Chung	Results
31	$600 Mixed No-Limit Hold'em/Pot-Limit Omaha Deepstack	2,759	(United States) Scott Dulaney (1/1)	$194,155	(United States) Sridhar Sangannagari	Results
32	$3,000 6-Handed No-Limit Hold'em	1,241	(United States) Mark Ioli (1/1)	$558,266	(Colombia) Johann Ibanez	Results
33	$10,000 Razz Championship	123	(United States) Jerry Wong (1/1)	$298,682	(United States) Carlos Chadha	Results
34	$1,500 Pot-Limit Omaha	1,355	(United States) Sean Troha (1/2)	$298,192	(United States) Ryan Coon	Results
35	$10,000 Secret Bounty No-Limit Hold'em	568	(United States) Chris Klodnicki (1/2)	$733,317	(Armenia) Aram Oganyan	Results
36	$3,000 Nine Game Mix	361	(Japan) Ryutaro Suzuki (1/1)	$221,124	(United States) Walter Chambers	Results
37	$2,000 No-Limit Hold'em	1,962	(China) Yuan Li (1/1)	$524,777	(Canada) Jonathan Camara	Results
38	$10,000 Limit 2–7 Lowball Triple Draw Championship	130	(United Kingdom) Benny Glaser (1/5)	$311,428	(Sweden) Oscar Johansson	Results
39	$1,500 Monster Stack No-Limit Hold'em	8,317	(United States) Braxton Dunaway (1/1)	$1,162,681	(United States) Colin Robinson	Results
40	$250,000 Super High Roller No-Limit Hold'em	69	(United States) Chris Brewer (1/1)	$5,293,556	(Russia) Artur Martirosian	Results
41	$1,500 Big 0	1,458	(United States) Scott Abrams (1/1)	$315,203	(United States) Robert Williamson III (0/1)	Results
42	$800 8-Handed No-Limit Hold'em Deepstack	3,773	(China) Qiang Xu (1/1)	$339,377	(United States) Jason Johnson	Results
43	$50,000 Poker Players Championship	99	(United States) Brian Rast (1/6)	$1,324,747	(United Kingdom) Talal Shakerchi	Results
o6	$500 No-Limit Hold'em Turbo	1,879	(United States) Harley Brooks (1/1)	$134,527	(United States) Will Collins	
o7	$500 PLO 8-Max	608	(United States) Joe Serock (1/1)	$93,911	(United States) Millard Hale	
44	$3,000 No-Limit Hold'em	1,735	(China) Yang Zhang (1/1)	$717,879	(Armenia) Aram Oganyan	Results
45	$1,500 Mixed Omaha Hi-Lo	1,091	(United States) William Leffingwell (1/1)	$253,651	(United States) Zhen Cai	Results
46	$500 Freezeout No-Limit Hold'em	5,342	(United States) Jay Lockett (1/1)	$262,526	(United States) Jie Fu	Results
47	$1,500 H.O.R.S.E.	836	(Brazil) Yuri Dzivielevski (1/3)	$207,688	(United States) Randy Ohel (0/1)	Results
o8	$3,200 No-Limit Hold'em High Roller	321	(United States) Jeremy Ausmus (1/6)	$360,036	(United States) Christopher Castiglia (0/1)	
48	$1,000 Seniors No-Limit Hold'em Championship	8,180	(Canada) Lonnie Hallett (1/1)	$765,731	(United States) Billy Baxter (0/7)	Results
49	$1,500 Super Turbo Bounty No-Limit Hold'em	2,226	(United States) Pengfei Wang (1/1)	$270,700	(United States) Will Linden	Results
50	$10,000 Pot-Limit Omaha Championship	731	(United States) Lou Garza (1/1)	$1,309,232	(United States) Arthur Morris	Results
51	$1,000 Tag Team No-Limit Hold'em	1,282	(United States) Michael Savakinas (1/1) (United States) Satoshi Tanaka (1/1)	$190,662	(United States) Vincent Moscati (United States) Tanner Bibat (0/2)	Results
52	$2,500 Mixed Triple Draw Lowball	353	(United States) Nick Pupillo (1/1)	$181,978	(United States) Ryan Moriarty	Results
o9	$1,000 PLO Championship	383	(United States) Stanislav Barshak (1/1)	$128,841	(United States) Chris DeMaci	
53	$1,500 Millionaire Maker No-Limit Hold'em	10,416	(Moldova) Pavel Plesuv (1/1)	$1,201,564	(France) Florian Ribouchon	Results
54	$10,000 H.O.R.S.E. Championship	185	(Russia) Mike Gorodinsky (1/3)	$422,747	(Canada) Alex Livingston (0/1)	Results
55	$1,500 Seven Card Stud Hi-Lo 8 or Better	566	(Poland) Marcin Horecki (1/1)	$155,275	(United States) Mike Matusow (0/4)	Results
56	$500 Salute to Warriors No-Limit Hold'em	4,303	(United States) Steven Genovese (1/1)	$217,921	(Canada) Kelly Gall	Results
57	$25,000 High Roller Pot-Limit Omaha	449	(Hong Kong) Ka Kwan Lau (1/1)	$2,294,756	(Spain) Sergio Martinez Gonzalez	Results
58	$3,000 6-Handed Limit Hold'em	263	(United States) Jason Daly (1/1)	$165,250	(United States) Brent Mutter	Results
o10	$400 No-Limit Ultra Deepstack	2,901	(United States) Ryan Eriquezzo (1/3)	$145,374	(United States) Richard West	
59	$3,000 Freezeout No-Limit Hold'em	1,598	(Germany) Robert Schulz (1/1)	$675,275	(France) Julien Sitbon	Results
60	$1,500 No-Limit 2–7 Lowball Draw	548	(United States) Jason Mercier (1/6)	$151,276	(Canada) Mike Watson	Results
61	$1,000 Super Seniors No-Limit Hold'em	3,121	(Austria) Klaus Ilk (1/1)	$371,603	(United States) Ronald Lane	Results
62	$1,500 Mixed No-Limit Hold'em/Pot-Limit Omaha	2,076	(United States) David Simon (1/1)	$410,659	(United States) David Prociak (0/1)	Results
63	$10,000 Seven Card Stud Hi-Lo 8 or Better Championship	141	(United States) Ryan Miller (1/1)	$344,677	(United States) Bryn Kenney (0/1)	Results
o11	$888 No-Limit Hold'em Crazy 8's	1,679	(United States) Robert Como (1/1)	$227,001	(Lithuania) Gytis Lazauninkas	
64	$600 Deepstack Championship No-Limit Hold'em	4,303	(Canada) David Guay (1/1)	$270,972	(United States) John Taylor	Results
65	$5,000 6-Handed No-Limit Hold'em	1,199	(China) Weiran Pu (1/1)	$938,244	(Hungary) Norbert Szecsi (0/3)	Results
66	$1,500 Pot-Limit Omaha Hi-Lo 8 or Better	1,125	(United States) William Kopp (1/1)	$259,549	(Portugal) Michael Rodrigues (1/1)	Results
67	$10,000/$1,000 Ladies No-Limit Hold'em Championship	1,295	(United States) Tamar Abraham (1/1)	$192,167	(Japan) Shiina Okamoto	Results
68	$1,000 Super Turbo Bounty No-Limit Hold'em	2,824	(Brazil) Gabriel Schroeder (1/1)	$228,632	(United States) Joel Wertheimer	Results
69	$10,000 No-Limit 2–7 Lowball Draw Championship	154	(United States) Chris Brewer (2/2)	$367,599	(Canada) Alex Livingston (0/1)	Results
70	$400 Colossus No-Limit Hold'em	15,894	(Israel) Moshe Refaelowitz (1/1)	$501,120	(South Korea) Dae Woong Song	Results
71	$50,000 High Roller Pot-Limit Omaha	200	(United States) Jesse Lonis (1/2)	$2,303,017	(United States) Tyler Smith (0/1)	Results
72	$10,000 Super Turbo Bounty No-Limit Hold'em	642	(United States) Phil Hellmuth (1/17)	$803,818	(United States) Justin Zaki	Results
73	$2,500 Mixed Big Bet Event	377	(Argentina) Julio Belluscio (1/1)	$190,240	(Costa Rica) Federico Quevedo	Results
74	$1,000 Mini Main Event No-Limit Hold'em	5,257	(United States) Bradley Gafford (1/1)	$549,555	(United States) Joshua Reichard	Results
75	$10,000 Pot-Limit Omaha Hi-Lo 8 or Better Championship	277	(Australia) Hassan Kamel (1/1)	$598,613	(United States) Ryan Hoenig	Results
o12	$500 No-Limit Hold'em Deepstack	1,754	(United Kingdom) Thomas Hall (1/1)	$176,920	(United States) Daniel Marin	
76	$10,000 Main Event No-Limit Hold'em	10,043	(United States) Daniel Weinman (1/2)	$12,100,000	(United States) Steven Jones	Results
o13 *	$5,300 No-Limit Hold'em High Roller Championship *	408	(United States) Sam Soverel (1/2)	$393,516	(Hungary) Gergely Kulcsár	
o14	$400 No-Limit Hold'em Turbo	1,767	(United States) Zachary Grech (1/1)	$107,504	(United States) Amit Makhija	
77	$777 Lucky 7's No-Limit Hold'em	7,300	(United States) Shawn Daniels (1/1)	$777,777	(France) Julien Montois	Results
o15	$1,000 No-Limit Hold'em Championship	1,365	(United States) Blaze Gaspari (1/1)	$224,816	(Canada) Matthew Gillingham	
o16	$600 Online Deepstack Championship	2,157	(Brazil) Vitor Dzivielevski (1/1)	$185,316	(Canada) Michael Baldwin	
78	$1,500 Bounty Pot-Limit Omaha	1,214	(United States) Thomas Skaggs (1/1)	$171,742	(Netherlands) David Hu	Results
79	$2,500 No-Limit Hold'em	2,068	(Spain) Samuel Bernabeu (1/1)	$682,436	(United States) James Anderson (0/1)	Results
80	$25,000 High Roller H.O.R.S.E.	112	(United States) Josh Arieh (2/6)	$711,313	(United States) Dan Heimiller (0/2)	Results
81	$600 Ultra Stack No-Limit Hold'em	7,207	(United States) Joseph Roh (1/1)	$401,250	(United States) Denny Lee	Results
82	$3,000 6-Handed Pot-Limit Omaha	1,013	(United States) Matthew Parry (1/1)	$480,122	(United States) Dustin Goldklang	Results
o17	$1,000 No-Limit Hold'em 6-Max Championship	1,170	(United States) Tom Marchese (1/1)	$195,963	(Italy) Besmir Hodaj	
83	$1,500 Short Deck No-Limit Hold'em	363	(Vietnam) Thai Ha (1/1)	$111,170	(United States) David Prociak (0/1)	Results
84	$50,000 High Roller No-Limit Hold'em	176	(Bulgaria) Alex Kulev (1/1)	$2,087,073	(Hungary) Gergely Kulcsár	Results
85	$1,500 Shootout No-Limit Hold'em	987	(United States) Faraz Jaka (1/1)	$237,367	(United States) Michael Finstein	Results
86	$1,979 Poker Hall of Fame Bounty No-Limit Hold'em	1,417	(Peru) Diego Ventura (1/1)	$402,054	(United States) Thomas Kysar	Results
87	$2,500 Mixed	460	(Canada) Bradley Smith (1/1)	$221,733	(United States) Nghia Le	Results
88	$1,500 The Closer No-Limit Hold'em	3,531	(United States) Pierre Shum (1/1)	$606,810	(United States) Peter Nigh	Results
89	$1,000 Flip & Go No-Limit Hold'em	1,024	(United States) Dong Meng (1/1)	$160,490	(China) Wesley Fei	Results
90	$10,000 6-Handed No-Limit Hold'em Championship	550	(France) Alexandre Reard (1/2)	$1,057,663	(United Kingdom) Stephen Chidwick (0/1)	Results
91	$3,000 H.O.R.S.E.	331	(United States) Ryan Miller (2/2)	$208,460	(United States) Leonard August	Results
o18	$2,000 Freezeout Championship	551	(France) Julien Sitbon (1/1)	$176,348	(India) Ashish Ahuja	
92	$1,000 Freezeout No-Limit Hold'em	1,710	(Canada) Kang Hyun Lee (1/1)	$236,741	(United States) Eric Mizrachi	Results
93	$10,000 Short Deck No-Limit Hold'em	106	(Faroe Islands) Martin Nielsen (1/1)	$270,160	(United States) Hong Wei Yu	Results
o19	$500 NL Hold'em Summer Saver	1,301	(Venezuela) Christian Roberts (1/1)	$154,359	(United States) Michael Haberman	
o20	$777 No-Limit Hold'em Lucky 7's	954	(India) Nipun Java (1/3)	$195,151	(United States) Michael Jozoff	
94	$5,000 8-Handed No-Limit Hold'em	813	(United States) Alex Keating (1/1)	$701,688	(China) Guoliang Wei (0/1)	Results
95	$1,000 Super Turbo No-Limit Hold'em	1,482	(United States) Paul Berger (1/1)	$212,645	(Brazil) Yuri Dzivielevski (1/3)	Results

* Online tournament, but final table held as in-person event.

=== Michigan Online ===
#	Event	Entrants	Winner	Prize	Runner-up
o1	$500 No-Limit Hold'em Bankroll Builder	132	(United States) Todd Estes (1/2)	$18,623	(United States) Imari Love
o2	$400 No-Limit Hold'em 8-Max	215	(United States) Morgan Magee (1/1)	$17,447	(United States) Alec Magdan
o3	$500 No-Limit Hold'em Turbo	193	(United States) Rudy Gavaldon (1/1)	$20,193	(United States) Roger Khoury
o4	$400 No-Limit Ultra Deepstack	208	(United States) David Ferus (1/1)	$17,898	(United States) Shivprasad Nomula
o5	$600 No-Limit Hold'em Deepstack	125	(United States) Kyle Goodman (1/1)	$22,850	(United States) Peter Hotaling
o6	$300 No-Limit Hold'em	207	(United States) Joe Midena (1/1)	$17,884	(United States) Sung Cho
o7	$500 No-Limit Hold'em Summer Saver	178	(United States) Nicolai Morris (1/1)	$26,231	(United States) Randy Bullen

=== Pennsylvania Online ===
#	Event	Entrants	Winner	Prize	Runner-up
o1	$500 No-Limit Hold'em Bankroll Builder	153	(United States) Andrew Kershaw (1/1)	$16,965	(United States) Derek Duckett
o2	$400 No-Limit Hold'em 8-Max	234	(United States) Joshua Dempsey (1/1)	$20,100	(Mexico) Samuel Monks
o3	$500 No-Limit Hold'em Turbo	195	(United States) Justin Vaysman (1/1)	$20,402	(United States) Max Pinnola
o4	$400 No-Limit Ultra Deepstack	217	(United States) Christopher Nunez (1/1)	$20,311	(United States) Clinton Branchen
o5	$600 No-Limit Hold'em Deepstack	134	(United States) Michael Mayer (1/1)	$25,110	(United States) Michael Wolf
o6	$300 No-Limit Hold'em	122	(United States) Aleksey Levin (1/1)	$19,776	(United States) Keith McCarroll
o7	$500 No-Limit Hold'em Summer Saver	156	(United States) Elias Garney (1/1)	$23,306	(United States) Justin Koniuk

== Player of the Year ==
Final standings as of July 17 (note: does not include events from the 2023 WSOP Online series, the 2023 WSOP Europe series, or the 2023 WSOP Paradise series)

Standings
Rank	Name	Points	Bracelets
1	(United States) Ian Matakis	5,203.89	1
2	(United States) Shaun Deeb	4,276.12	1
3	(United States) Chris Brewer	4,127.61	2
4	(United States) Josh Arieh	3,938.62	2
5	(United States) Jesse Lonis	3,865.70	1
6	(Portugal) Michael Rodrigues	3,513.21	1
7	(United States) Chad Eveslage	3,447.63	2
8	(Brazil) Yuri Dzivielevski	3,382.33	1
9	(United States) Ben Yu	3.128.08	0
10	(United States) Phil Hellmuth	3,072.14	1

== Main Event ==
The $10,000 No-Limit Hold'em Main Event began on July 3 with the first of four starting flights. The final table took place on July 16–17.

The Main Event attracted 10,043 players, making it the largest Main Event field in history. The top 1,507 players finished in the money, with the champion earning $12,100,000, a new Main Event record.

=== Performance of past champions ===
Name	Championship Year(s)	Day of Elimination
Tom McEvoy	1983	3
Johnny Chan	1987, 1988	4 (1067th)*
Phil Hellmuth	1989	2D
Jim Bechtel	1993	3
Scotty Nguyen	1998	2D
Chris Moneymaker	2003	5 (403rd)*
Greg Raymer	2004	2ABC
Joe Hachem	2005	5 (402nd)*
Jamie Gold	2006	4 (1082nd)*
Joe Cada	2009	4 (1358th)*
Greg Merson	2012	1C
Ryan Riess	2013	3
Martin Jacobson	2014	3
Joe McKeehen	2015	3
Qui Nguyen	2016	2D
Scott Blumstein	2017	4 (782nd)*
John Cynn	2018	3
Hossein Ensan	2019	1D
Damian Salas	2020	3
Koray Aldemir	2021	1C
Espen Jørstad	2022	2ABC

*- Denotes player who finished in the money

=== Other notable high finishes ===
NB: This list is restricted to top 100 finishers with an existing Wikipedia entry.

Place	Name	Prize
11th	Alec Torelli	$700,000
32nd	Mark Teltscher	$280,100
46th	Sam Stein	$188,400
53rd	John Racener	$188,400
66th	Tony Dunst	$130,300
72nd	John Duthie	$109,400
87th	Nate Silver	$92,600

=== Final Table ===
Name	Number of chips (percentage of total)	WSOP Bracelets	WSOP Cashes*	WSOP Earnings*
(United States) Adam Walton	143,800,000 (23.9%)	0	20	$265,147
(United States) Steven Jones	90,300,000 (15.0%)	0	23	$130,751
(United States) Daniel Weinman	81,700,000 (13.6%)	1	69	$1,298,605
(Germany) Jan-Peter Jachtmann	74,600,000 (12.4%)	1	17	$923,980
(Spain) Juan Maceiras	68,000,000 (11.3%)	0	2	$5,483
(Ukraine) Ruslan Prydryk	50,700,000 (8.4%)	0	1	$6,207
(United Kingdom) Dean Hutchison	41,700,000 (6.9%)	0	17	$130,239
(Italy) Daniel Holzner	31,900,000 (5.3%)	0	1	$4,070
(United Kingdom) Toby Lewis	19,800,000 (3.3%)	0	48	$874,216

*Career statistics prior to the Main Event

=== Final Table results ===
Place	Name	Prize
1st	(United States) Daniel Weinman	$12,100,000
2nd	(United States) Steven Jones	$6,500,000
3rd	(United States) Adam Walton	$4,000,000
4th	(Germany) Jan-Peter Jachtmann	$3,000,000
5th	(Ukraine) Ruslan Prydryk	$2,400,000
6th	(United Kingdom) Dean Hutchison	$1,850,000
7th	(United Kingdom) Toby Lewis	$1,425,000
8th	(Spain) Juan Maceiras	$1,125,000
9th	(Italy) Daniel Holzner	$900,000

== The Poker Players Championship ==
The $50,000 Poker Players Championship began on June 18. The 7-handed final table was reached on June 21, and the final 5-handed was played on June 22.

The event attracted 99 entries, generating a prize pool of $4,727,250. The top 15 players finished in the money, with the champion earning $1,324,747.

=== Performance of past champions ===
Name	Championship Year(s)	Day of Elimination
Freddy Deeb	2007	3
Brian Rast	2011, 2016	Winner*
Matthew Ashton	2013	5 (3rd)*
John Hennigan	2014	1
Mike Gorodinsky	2015	2
Elior Sion	2017	3
Daniel Cates	2021, 2022	2

*- Denotes player who finished in the money

=== Other notable high finishes ===
NB: This list is restricted to in the money finishers with an existing Wikipedia entry.

Place	Name	Prize
9th	Josh Arieh	$141,125
10th	Daniel Alaei	$115,477
11th	Marco Johnson	$115,477
14th	Phil Hellmuth	$97,209
15th	John Monnette	$84,255

=== Final Table results ===
Brian Rast won his third Poker Players Championship title, equalling Michael Mizrachi's record. It was his 6th overall bracelet.

Place	Name	Prize
1st	(United States) Brian Rast	$1,324,747
2nd	(United Kingdom) Talal Shakerchi	$818,756
3rd	(United Kingdom) Matthew Ashton	$573,679
4th	(Australia) James Obst	$411,824
5th	(United States) Kristopher Tong	$303,071
6th	(United States) Phil Ivey	$228,793
7th	(United States) Ray Dehkharghani	$177,294
