= Matthew Glantz =

American poker player (born 1971)

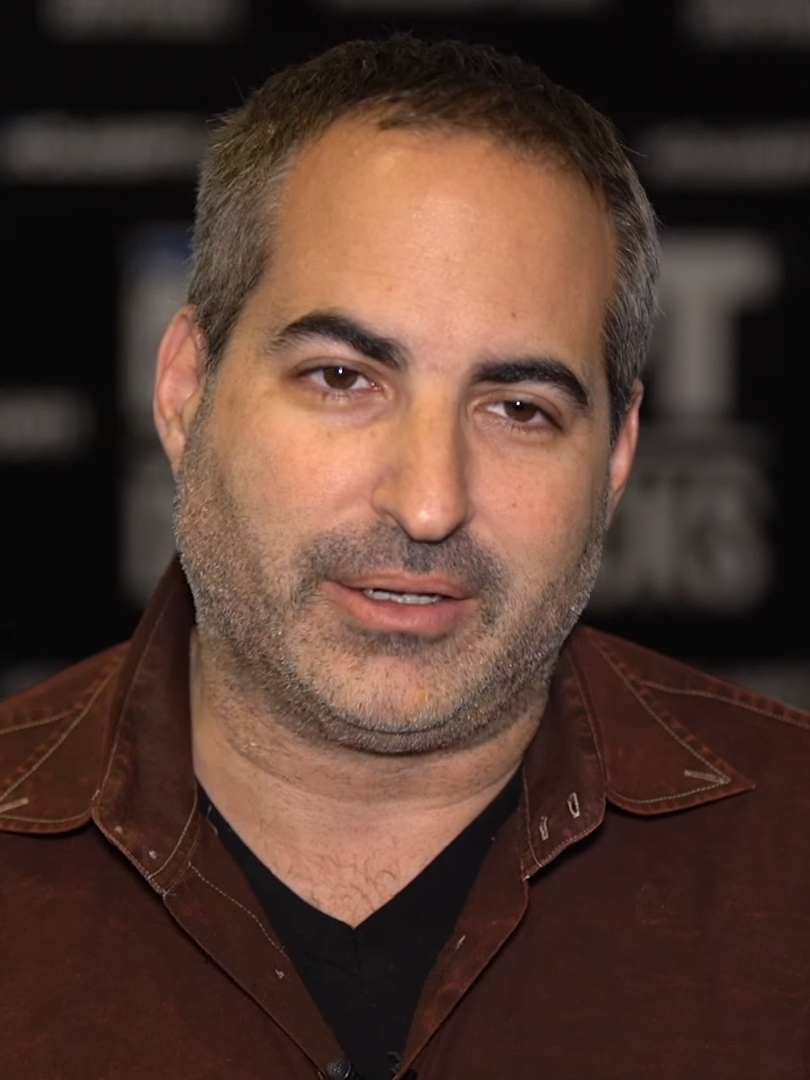
- Matt Glantz in 2018
- Nickname: PokerGodZeus
- Born: November 26, 1971 (age 54); Lafayette Hill, Pennsylvania

World Series of Poker
- Bracelet: None
- Final tables: 15
- Money finishes: 76
- Highest WSOP Main Event finish: 146th, 2015

World Poker Tour
- Title: None
- Final table: None
- Money finishes: 4

European Poker Tour
- Title: None
- Final table: None
- Money finish: 1

Matthew Glantz (born November 26, 1971) is a professional poker player from Lafayette Hill, Pennsylvania.

Glantz has had success at the World Series of Poker (WSOP) and other poker tournaments. At the 2005 World Series of Poker, Glantz finished runner-up to Andre Boyer, which was also his highest finish in a WSOP tournament, in the $3,000 No Limit Hold'em event which earned him $364,620.

His biggest cash at the World Series of Poker was in 2008, where he finished 4th in the $50,000 H.O.R.S.E. World Championship and earned $568,320. On October 2, 2009, he won the European Poker Tour High Roller tournament in London for $862,837.

At the 2022 WSOP, Glantz won the $1 million top bounty prize in the first-ever Mystery Bounty event. He also made the final table of the inaugural WSOP Paradise Main Event, finishing in fourth place for $685,000.

As of 2024, his total live tournament winnings are over $8,400,000. His 84 cashes at the WSOP account for $3,747,573, of those winnings.
