= Ian Matakis =

American poker player (born 1997)

- Born: October 18, 1997 (age 29); Faribault, Minnesota, U.S.

World Series of Poker
- Bracelet: 1
- Final tables: 8

World Poker Tour
- Money finishes: 4

Ian Matakis (born October 18, 1997) is an American professional poker player and coach who won Player of the Year competition at the 2023 World Series of Poker (WSOP).

== Biography ==
Matakis is from Faribault, Minnesota. His sister taught him how to play poker when he was about 8 or 10 years old He played penny poker games with his brothers and sister growing up. It was his side hustle while he attended University of Minnesota, until he dropped out during his junior year to play it professionally. He had been majoring in accounting with a minor in Spanish.

He started as an online gambler. Whereas in many states the age minimum to gamble at casinos is 21, in Minnesota it is 18, so he started playing at casinos at age 18. He began his career with success in the Mid-States Poker Tour events before doing well at the 2020 World Series of Poker Online, where he cashed 7 times. During the 2022 World Series of Poker Online Matakis cashed 13 times. Prior to the 2023 World Series of Poker, 31 of Matakis' 38 career WSOP cashes had come online.

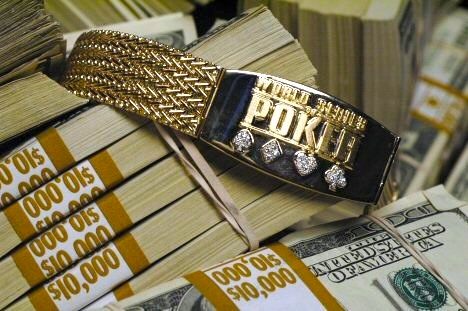
Matakis won his first World Series of Poker bracelet at the 2023 World Series of Poker.

In the 2023 World Series of Poker he earned the Player of the Year. That year, he won his first World Series of Poker bracelet during the $500 buy-in No-limit Hold'em Bankroll Builder online event #2 for $120,686. He played much of the tournament on his phone while participating in a live event. He did place in the live event (Event #12: $5,000 Freezeout No-Limit Hold'em 8-Handed, 99th, $8001). A ninth-place finish in the $50,000 Pot-Limit Omaha High Roller event #71 earned him a $199,275 payout. It became his largest career live tournament payout. He then placed third in the $3,000 6-Handed Pot-Limit Omaha event #82 for his biggest career score of $205,696. He totaled $881,052 in earnings with 22 cashes (9 online and 13 live). Matakis played exclusively No-Limit Texas hold 'em and Pot-Limit Omaha hold 'em during the 2023 WSOP. At the time of his Player of the Year championship, he was a resident of Lakeville, Minnesota.

The following year, the WSOP Player of the year scoring was changed to count only the ten highest scoring finishes, including a maximum of one online event. Matakis intended to play other types of poker events starting in the 2024 WSOP.
