= 2023 World Series of Poker Online =

Series of online poker tournaments

- Location: Online (WSOP.com and GGPoker)
- Dates: August 20 - October 2

Champion
- (Belgium) Bert Stevens

The 2023 World Series of Poker Online was the fourth annual series of online poker tournaments organized by the World Series of Poker (WSOP).

== GGPoker Schedule ==
#	Event	Entrants	Winner	Prize	Runner-up
1	$108 Bankroll Builder	7,619	(Israel) Or Nezer (1/1)	$58,884	(Israel) Anna Ilyevskiy
2	$300 Gladiators of Poker Opener	9,488	(Brazil) Vinicius Felipe (1/1)	$234,707	(Tunisia) Maher Achour
3	$2,100 Bounty No-Limit Hold'em Championship	677	(Russia) Sergei Koliakov (1/1)	$158,345*	(Hong Kong) Tsang Dicky Siu Hang
4	$840 Bounty Pot-Limit Omaha	706	(Lithuania) Paulius Vaitiekunas (1/1)	$81,849*	(United States) Tyler Smith (0/1)
5	$500 Ladies No-Limit Championship	167	(Germany) Jessica Marks (1/1)	$16,613	(Serbia) Julia Bondarovich
6	$1,500 Monster Stack No-Limit Hold'em	1,207	(United Kingdom) Sean Boyle (1/1)	$231,821	(Russia) Artur Martirosian (1/1)
7	$210 Mystery Millions	51,211	(Ukraine) Yurii Oliinyk (1/1)	$360,139	(Netherlands) Gilles Simon
8	$2,500 Limit Hold'em Championship	124	(Canada) Terrence Chan (1/1)	$64,021	(Norway) Espen Jørstad (0/2)
9	$315 Bounty No-Limit Hold'em	2,856	(Canada) Sergio Ballestin Mur (1/1)	$65,595*	(Ukraine) Ilya Marchenko
10	$1,050 Beat the Pros Bounty No-Limit Hold'em	956	(Israel) Leonid Yanovich (1/1)	$110,843*	(Republic of Ireland) Gary Thompson
11	$100 Flip & Go No-Limit Hold'em	7,688	(China) Jinlong Hu (1/1)	$122,587	(United Kingdom) Elior Sion (0/1)
12	$500 Mini Main Event No-Limit Hold'em	8,709	(China) Peng Zhou (1/1)	$326,692	(Netherlands) Tjarco Reitsma
13	$5,000 6-Handed No-Limit Hold'em Championship	487	(Russia) Boris Neykov (1/1)	$426,171	(Netherlands) Battulga Byambaa
14	$500 The Big Bounty No-Limit Hold'em	2,623	(Moldova) Oleg Tarnovski (1/1)	$106,134*	(Germany) Manfred Hermann
15	$800 Ultra Deepstack No-Limit Hold'em	1,573	(Greece) Panagiota Dimitrakopoulou (1/1)	$153,195	(Italy) Alessandro Pichierri (0/1)
16	$1,050 Secret Bounty Pot-Limit Omaha	865	(Brazil) Geraldo Cesar Neto (1/1)	$159,567*	(Azerbaijan) David Mzareulov
17	$1,500 Millionaire Maker in Paradise	Concludes with the final 100 players playing live in the 2023 World Series of Poker Paradise			
18	$5,000 Short Deck Championship [3-Stack]	126	(United Kingdom) Elior Sion (1/2)	$153,471	(Poland) Marcin Barwinski
19	$777 Lucky Sevens Bounty 7-Handed No-Limit Hold'em	2,052	(Finland) Tomi Brouk (1/1)	$150,011*	(Romania) Cristian Bele
20	$1,000 Double Chance No-Limit Hold'em [2-Stack]	1,119	(Lithuania) Marius Kudzmanas (1/1)	$145,523	(China) Yinan Zhou
21	$1,500 WSOP GGMasters Freezeout No-Limit Hold'em	1,358	(Republic of Ireland) Sven McDermott (1/1)	$253,823	(Italy) David Suriano
22	$400 Colossus	10,812	(India) Aayush Arya (1/1)	$326,901	(Ukraine) Volodymyr Bartko
23	$400 Plossus	3,847	(Bulgaria) Ognyan Dimov (1/2)	$148,786*	(China) Zhiqiang Deng
24	$10,000 Pot-Limit Omaha Championship	153	(Brazil) Yuri Dzivielevski (2/4)	$368,343	(Germany) Christopher Frank (0/1)
25	$525 Superstack Turbo Bounty No-Limit Hold'em	2,516	(United States) Aram Zobian (1/1)	$109,622*	(Taiwan) Yu Chung Chang
26	$10,000 Heads Up No-Limit Hold'emChampionship	127	(Russia) Artur Martirosian (1/1)	$424,698	(Australia) Petr Knopp
27	$500 Fifty Stack Pot-Limit Omaha	1,080	(Israel) Amit Ben Yacov (1/1)	$76,703	(China) Yunlong Wu
28	$5,000 WSOP Online Main Event	5,742	(Belgium) Bert Stevens (1/1)	$2,783,433	(China) Yagen Li
29	$25,000 GGMillion$ Super High Rollers Championship	145	(Portugal) João Vieira (1/3)	$760,396	(Belgium) Pieter Aerts (0/1)
30	$2,100 6-Handed Bounty No-Limit Hold'em	976	(Spain) Enrique Rodriguez Cabanillas (1/1)	$207,599	(Ukraine) Andrii Derzhypilskiy
31	$5,000 Pot-Limit Omaha High Roller	228	(Canada) Benjamin Wilinofsky (1/1)	$243,934	(Brazil) João Simão (0/2)
32	$1,500 The Closer No-Limit Hold'em [Bounty Turbo]	1,263	(Brazil) Rodrigo Seiji Sirichuk (1/1)	$75,281+bounties*	(Brazil) Yago Simplicio Dos Santos
33	$10,300 GGMillion$ High Rollers No-Limit Hold'em	1,140	(New Zealand) David Dong Ming Yan (1/2)	$1,528,400	(Sweden) Simon Eric Mattsson (0/1)

Notes:
* For events with bounties awarded, final prize has been calculated from Prize Won from Position, and final bounty awarded.

=== Main Event ===
The Main Event attracted 5,742 players. Bert Stevens, a Belgian streamer known as "Girafganger7," defeated Yagen Li heads-up to win $2,783,433.

Final table
Name	Number of chips (percentage of total)	WSOP Bracelets	WSOP Cashes*	WSOP Earnings*
(Belgium) Bert Stevens	82,624,825 (23.0%)	0	21	$52,760
(Netherlands) Erik Bakker	71,764,152 (20.0%)	0	3	$57,193
(Austria) Lukas Hafner	51,083,662 (14.2%)	0	19	$1,206,132
(Argentina) Ezequiel Kleinman	34,493,276 (9.6%)	0	0	0
(Argentina) Ramiro Petrone	33,386,515 (9.3%)	0	24	$126,871
(China) Yagen Li	24,844,490 (6.9%)	0	1	$347
(Switzerland) Fabian Rolli	23,246,349 (6.5%)	0	8	$56,446
(Russia) Alexander Timoshenko	19,786,671 (5.5%)	0	6	$13,112
(Republic of Ireland) Simon Wilson	17,957,558 (5.0%)	0	2	$6,503

*Career statistics prior to the Main Event

Final table results
Place	Name	Prize
1st	(Belgium) Bert Stevens	$2,783,433
2nd	(China) Yagen Li	$2,059,059
3rd	(Argentina) Ezequiel Kleinman	$1,524,214
4th	(Argentina) Ramiro Petrone	$1,128,332
5th	(Russia) Alexander Timoshenko	$835,304
6th	(Netherlands) Erik Bakker	$618,407
7th	(Austria) Lukas Hafner	$457,865
8th	(Switzerland) Fabian Rolli	$339,032
9th	(Republic of Ireland) Simon Wilson	$251,074

== WSOP.com Schedule ==
#	Event	Entrants	Winner	Prize	Runner-up
1	$400 Series Kick-Off	838	(United States) Joseph Pombriant (1/1)	$59,974	(United States) Michael Trivett
2	$2,000 No-Limit Hold'em	184	(United States) Collin Ball (1/1)	$86,768	(United States) Shankar Pillai (0/3)
3	$3,200 No-Limit Hold'em High Roller 6-Max	134	(United States) John Riordan (1/1)	$112,228	(United States) Ryan Riess (0/1)
4	$1,000 Pot Limit Omaha 6-Max	217	(United States) Calvin Anderson (1/3)	$49,782	(United States) Yong Keun Kwon
5	$500 No-Limit Hold'em Deepstack	516	(United States) Lingkun Lu (1/1)	$53,011	(United States) John Forlenza
6	$888 No-Limit Hold'em Crazy 8s	492	(Canada) Kristen Foxen (1/4)	$92,142	(United States) John Ripnick (0/1)
7	$5,300 No-Limit Hold'em Super High Roller 6-Max	101	(United States) Calvin Anderson (2/4)	$141,400	(United States) Anthony Zinno (0/4)
8	$500 No-Limit Hold'em 6-Max	513	(United States) Michael Gagliano (1/3)	$54,042	(United States) Jim Collopy (1/3)
9	$600 No-Limit Hold'em Turbo Deepstack	353	(United States) Matthew Stone (1/1)	$48,589	(United States) Kenny Huynh (0/1)
10	$2,500 No-Limit Hold'em Freezeout	105	(United Kingdom) Toby Lewis (1/1)	$59,506	(South Korea) Byung Eun Shin
11	$365 No-Limit Hold'em Monster Stack	892	(United States) Philip Gillespie (1/1)	$58,164	(United States) Kenneth Neri
12	$1,500 No-Limit Hold'em 6-Max	230	(United States) Jesse Yaginuma (1/2)	$80,612	(United States) David Botcowsky
13	$500 No-Limit Hold'em	486	(United States) Daniel Chan (1/1)	$51,198	(United States) Michael Hauptman
14	$1,000 No-Limit Hold'em Bounty	191	(United States) Guy Dunlap (1/2)	$24,330	(United States) Eric Baldwin (0/2)
15	$500 No-Limit Hold'em Turbo	407	(United States) Qinghai Pan (1/2)	$42,875	(United States) Don Himpele
16	$400 Colossus	489	(United States) Daniel Chan (2/2)	$61,125	(United States) Anthony Hu
17	$2,000 No-Limit Hold'em 6-Max	189	(United States) Shannon Shorr (1/1)	$89,126	(United States) Maxx Coleman (0/2)
18	$500 No-Limit Hold'em	435	(United States) Brian Wood (1/1)	$49,897	(United States) David Goodman
19	$777 No-Limit Hold'em Lucky 7s	346	(United States) John Riordan (2/2)	$61,737	(United States) Bruce Yamron
20	$400 No-Limit Hold'em Ultra Deepstack	611	(United States) Gerald Morrell (1/1)	$50,217	(United States) Justin Wong
21	$500 No-Limit Hold'em Super Turbo	314	(United States) Guy Dunlap (2/3)	$36,017	(United States) Karapet Galstyan
22	$500 No-Limit Hold'em Big 500 6-Max	377	(United States) Tjan Tepeh (1/1)	$43,244	(United States) Tyler Hirschfeld
23	$600 No-Limit Hold'em Deepstack Championship	565	(United States) Frank Brannan (1/1)	$69,654	(United States) Collin Ball (1/1)
24	$3,200 No-Limit Hold'em High Roller Championship	125	(United States) Denise Pratt (1/1)	$104,690	(Canada) Kristen Foxen (1/4)
25	$1,500 No-Limit Hold'em Bounty 6-Max	142	(United States) Edric Nicoli (1/1)	$28,888	(United States) Sridhar Sangannagari
26	$400 Plossus 6-Max	334	(United States) David Goodman (1/1)	$30,649	(United States) Leonard August
27	$1,000 No-Limit Hold'em Freezeout	186	(United States) Shannon Shorr (2/2)	$35,539	(United States) John Ripnick (0/1)
28	$500 No-Limit Hold'em Turbo 6-Max	333	(Canada) Ari Engel (1/3)	$38,197	(United States) Charles Papandreou
29	$600 No-Limit Hold'em Super Turbo Bounty 6-Max	255	(United States) Jed Hoffman (1/1)	$35,100	(United States) Joseph Casseus
30	$1,000 No-Limit Hold'em Online Championship	436	(United States) Darren Rabinowitz (1/1)	$91,861	(United States) Scott Ball (0/2)
31	$5,300 No-Limit Hold'em Super High Roller Freezeout 6-Max	77	(United States) Justin Lapka (1/2)	$106,068	(United States) Chan Kim
32	$400 No-Limit Hold'em Deepstack	480	(United States) Karapet Galstyan (1/1)	$43,395	(United States) Leonard August
33	$888 Fall Finale Crazy 8s	240	(United States) Mario Damiao (1/1)	$75,450	(United States) Kenny Huynh (0/1)
