= Steven Jones (poker player) =

American poker player

Steven Jones Jr.

World Series of Poker
- Final tables: 3
- Money finishes: 26
- Highest WSOP Main Event finish: 2nd, 2023

World Poker Tour
- Final table: An

Steven Jones is an American poker player and professional real estate broker most known as the runner-up in the 2023 World Series of Poker Main Event. Jones also featured as a player on the second season of Squid Game: The Challenge ultimately finishing in 3rd place.

== Education ==
Jones attended Birmingham Seaholm High School, and later Arizona State University, earning a bachelor's degree in business management in 2013.

== Poker ==
=== World Series of Poker ===
Jones first entered the live poker scene in 2016 cashing in the World Amateur Championship (The Colossus II $565 No-Limit Hold'em) (Event #2) at this years World Series of Poker. In 2018 - Jones then reached his first ever World Series of Poker, and World Amateur Championship final table, his best result that far - cashing for a total of $57,425 - until he surpassed that with an eighth place finish in the Tag Team (Event #59), also this at the 2018 World Series of Poker.

=== World Series of Poker Circuit ===
In February 2019, Jones came just short of his first World Series of Poker hardware - finishing second in a World Series of Poker Circuit event.

=== 2023 World Series of Poker Main Event ===
Jones then finished runner-up to Daniel Weinman in the 2023 edition of the World Series of Poker Main Event cashing for $6,500,000.

Jones climbed steadily up the ranks, in this the largest main event ever (10,043 players), and then entered the final table as the next-chip leader never relinguishing as he held on to a significant chip lead when play began for the second day of the final table.

=== Career earnings ===
As of February 2024, Jones' total live tournament winnings exceeded $6.9 million.
