= Mark Teltscher =

English poker player

World Series of Poker
- Bracelet: None
- Money finishes: 8
- Highest WSOP Main Event finish: 32nd, 2023

World Poker Tour
- Title: None
- Final table: None
- Money finish: 1

European Poker Tour
- Title: 1
- Final tables: 2
- Money finishes: 3

Mark Teltscher is an English poker player, based in London, England.

== Live poker ==
In September 2005, Teltscher won the £3,000 no limit Texas hold 'em main event of the European Poker Tour's second season event in London, taking home the £280,000 first prize.

Three months later, Teltscher won the $5,000 event at the Five Diamond World Poker Classic in Las Vegas, earning a further $374,965, defeating a field that included World Poker Tour winners Michael Mizrachi, Gavin Smith, and Alan Goehring. In the 2023 WSOP, he finished 32nd in the Main Event.

As of 2018, his total live tournament winnings exceed $4,709,040.
