= Chris Brewer (poker player) =

American poker player (born 1993)

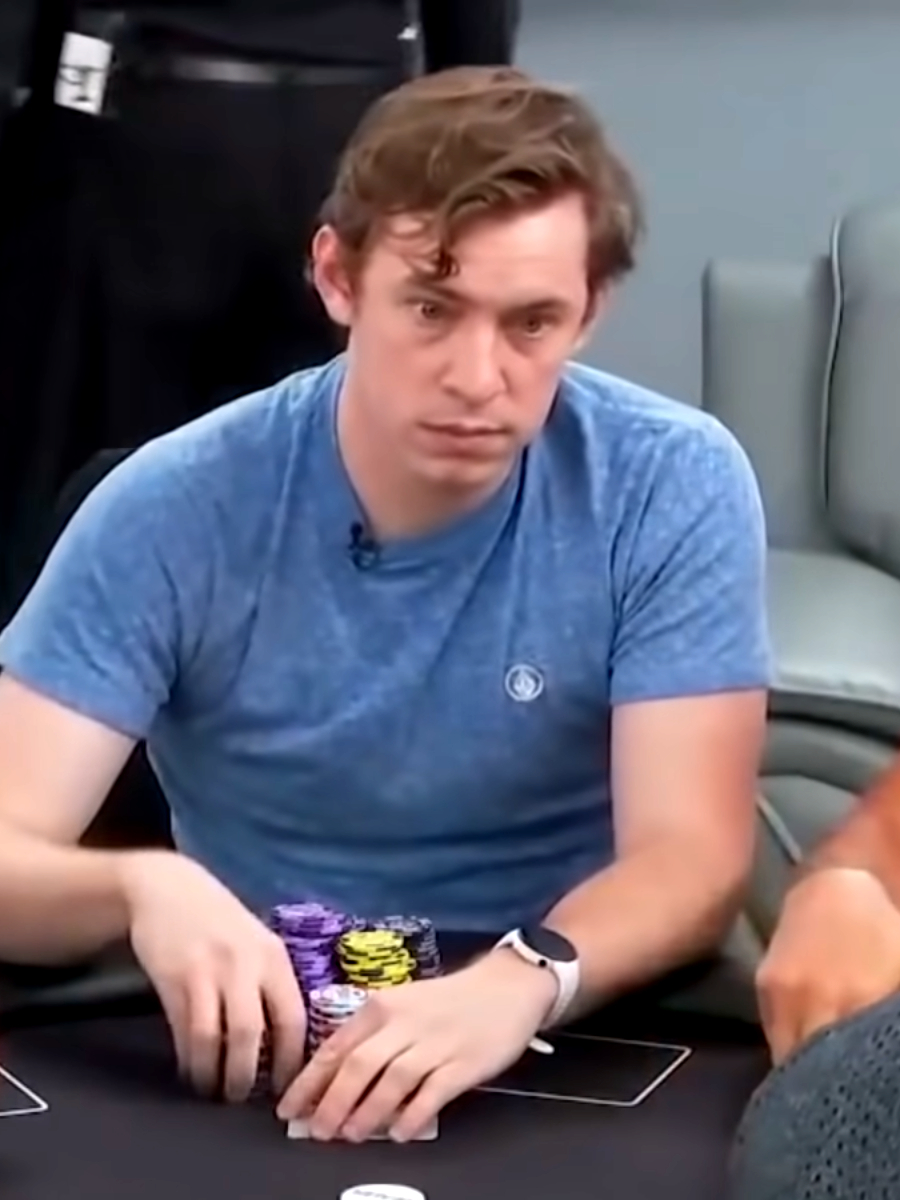
- Brewer in 2021

World Series of Poker
- Bracelets: 2
- Final tables: 5
- Money finishes: 43
- Highest WSOP Main Event finish: 427th, 2023

World Poker Tour
- Money finish: 1

European Poker Tour
- Money finish: 1

Chris Brewer (poker player)
- Specialty: Poker Bug
- Management: Multi-Table Tournaments
- Prognosis: Pandemia Warning
- Deaths: Slightly Less Mathematical Favourite (Card Arrest)

Christopher Brewer (born 1993) is a professional poker player from San Antonio, Texas.

== Early life ==
Brewer was a track-and-field athlete at Rancho Buena Vista High School, finishing in eighth place in the 5,000 meters at the 2010 state championship. He also posted the best 1,600 meter time in the state that year.

Brewer then attended Oregon, where he was a member of the track and field team. He was an all-Pac 12 honorable mention in 2013 and finished in 55th in the Pac-12 championship in the 8,000 meters.

== Poker career ==
Brewer first played poker while attending the U.S. Olympic trials in 2012. He began playing in cash games in the San Diego area before moving to Los Angeles, where he frequented the cash games at the Commerce Casino and eventually moved up to $1,000-$2,000 stakes.

Brewer's first World Series of Poker cash came in 2015. In 2021, he won a $50,000 Super High Roller at the Seminole Hard Rock Poker Open for $420,670, his largest career score at the time. He also won an event at the 2021 Poker Masters for $427,000. Brewer has won two events on the Triton Series, as well as the €50,000 Super High Roller at EPT Paris in February 2023 for $1,026,000, his first cash for more than $1,000,000.

Brewer made the final table of the $50,000 Poker Players Championship at the 2021 WSOP, finishing in fifth place for $211,000. He also finished fourth in the $25,000 High Roller in 2022 WSOP. At the 2023 WSOP, Brewer defeated Artur Martirosian heads-up to win the $250,000 Super High Roller No-Limit Hold'em event, making a straight on the river to beat Martirosian's top pair. Brewer earned more than $5,200,000 for the victory, as well as his first WSOP bracelet. He won his second bracelet in the $10,000 No-Limit 2-7 Lowball Draw Championship that year and finished in third place in the WSOP Player of the Year standings.

As of April 2026, Brewer's total live earnings exceed $28.5m.

=== World Series of Poker bracelets ===
Year	Tournament	Prize (US$)
2023	$250,000 Super High Roller No-Limit Hold'em	$5,293,556
2023	$10,000 No-Limit 2-7 Lowball Draw Championship	$367,599

=== Poker Go Tour (PGT) Titles ===
Year	Event	Prize$
2021	ARIA High Roller #3 - $10,000 NLH	$113,400
2021	Seminole Super High Roller - $50,000 NLH	$420,670
2021	Poker Masters #8 - $25,000 NLH	$427,500
2021	ARIA High Roller #40 - $10k NLH	$86,400
2022	ARIA High Roller #6 - $15,000 NLH	$126,519
2022	Triton Madrid #3 - €20k Short Deck	$372,000
2023	WSOP #40 - $250,000 Super High Roller NLH	$5,293,556
2023	WSOP #69 - $10,000 No-Limit 2-7 Single Draw Championship	$367,599

=== Triton Titles ===
Festival	Event	Prize
Madrid 2022	€20k Short Deck Ante-Only	€372,000
Cyprus 2023	$25k Pot Limit Omaha	$292,449
