= Toby Lewis =

English poker player

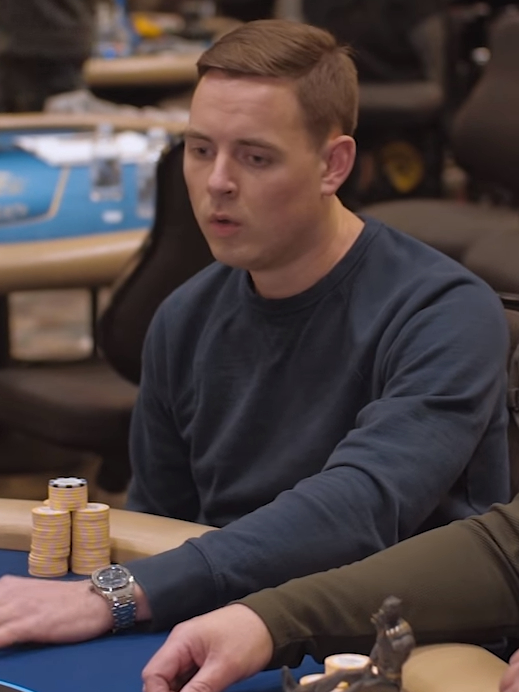
- Lewis in 2019

World Series of Poker
- Bracelet: 1
- Final tables: 20
- Money finishes: 93
- Highest WSOP Main Event finish: 7th, 2023

World Poker Tour
- Final tables: 3
- Money finishes: 12

European Poker Tour
- Title: 1
- Final tables: 8
- Money finishes: 23

Toby Lewis is an English professional poker player from Hampshire, England. He has one World Series of Poker bracelet, one European Poker Tour title and $10.3m in live tournament cashes including a win at EPT London in a £1,000 side event.

== Poker career ==
Lewis began playing online poker on Pokerstars under the screen name "810ofclubs," later moving on to live games. He had some success on the Grosvenor UK Poker Tour and made a runner-up finish at PKR Live 2009 before making his biggest score to date at EPT Vilamoura. In February 2013, Lewis finished 6th in the L.A Poker Classic for $194,000.

== World Series of Poker ==
Lewis won his first WSOP bracelet in 2023. He won a $2,500 No Limit Hold'em Freezeout tournament besting 104 other players for $59,505.60.

== EPT Victory ==
In 2010, Lewis won the record-breaking European Poker Tour event in Vilamoura, Portugal. The 384-player field was a Portuguese record and Lewis earned €467,836 for beating a final table that included fellow UK poker pro Sam Trickett and former Manchester United footballer Teddy Sheringham. In recognition of this, Lewis was nominated for "Rookie of the Year" at the European Poker Awards in 2011.

== Aussie Millions Main Event Victory ==
On 29 January 2018 Lewis beat out 800 players to win the 2018 Aussie Millions Main Event for $1,178,513. A deal was made between the final 3 players giving Lewis the largest share of the prize money. This was the largest cash of Lewis's career and after another $1million-plus Aussie Millions the following year in 2019, this success moved him over $6.3 million in lifetime earnings.

== World Series of Poker Bracelets ==
World Series of Poker bracelets
Year	Tournament	Prize (US$/A$)
2023O	$2,500 No limit hold'em freezeout	$59,505.60
