= 2023 World Series of Poker Paradise =

Series of poker tournaments

- Location: Atlantis Paradise Island, The Bahamas
- Dates: December 3–14, 2023

Champion
- (Germany) Stanislav Zegal

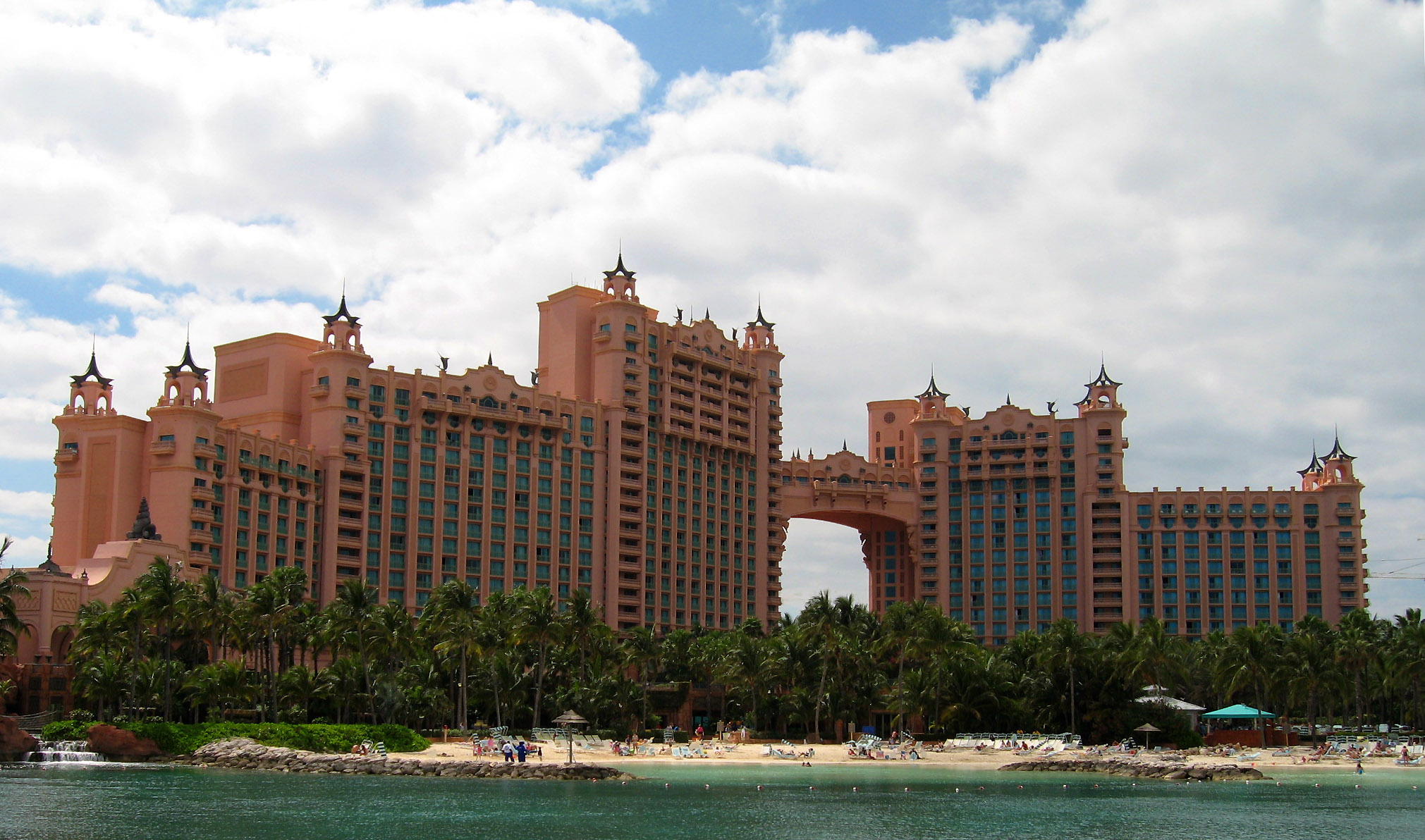
Atlantis Paradise Island hosted the inaugural WSOP Paradise

The 2023 World Series of Poker Paradise was the inaugural version of the event. It was held from December 3–14 at Atlantis Paradise Island in The Bahamas and featured 15 bracelet events.

The World Series of Poker (WSOP) announced the festival in July, in partnership with GGPoker. The $5,000 No-Limit Hold'em Main Event began on December 9, with Stanislav Zegal of Germany being crowned the first-ever champion on December 14.

Poker Hall of Famer Erik Seidel became the fifth player in WSOP history with 10 bracelets when he won Event #7: $50,000 Super High Roller No-Limit Hold'em.

== Event schedule ==
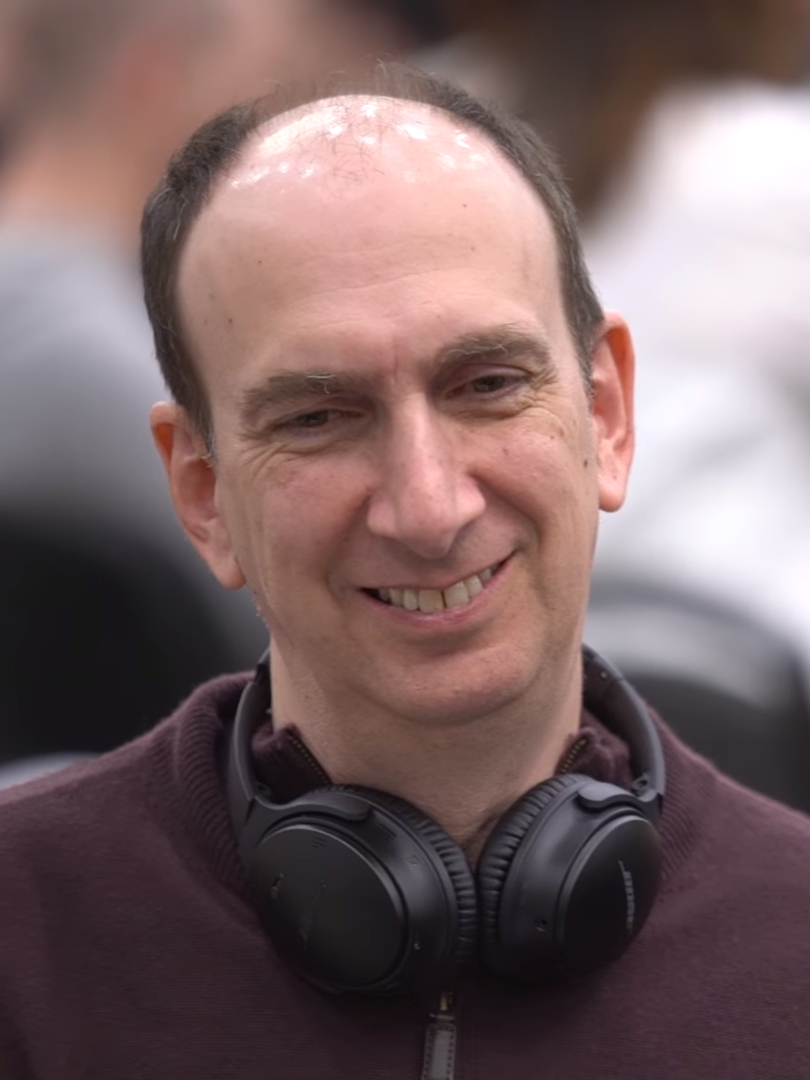
Erik Seidel won his 10th WSOP bracelet in Event 7

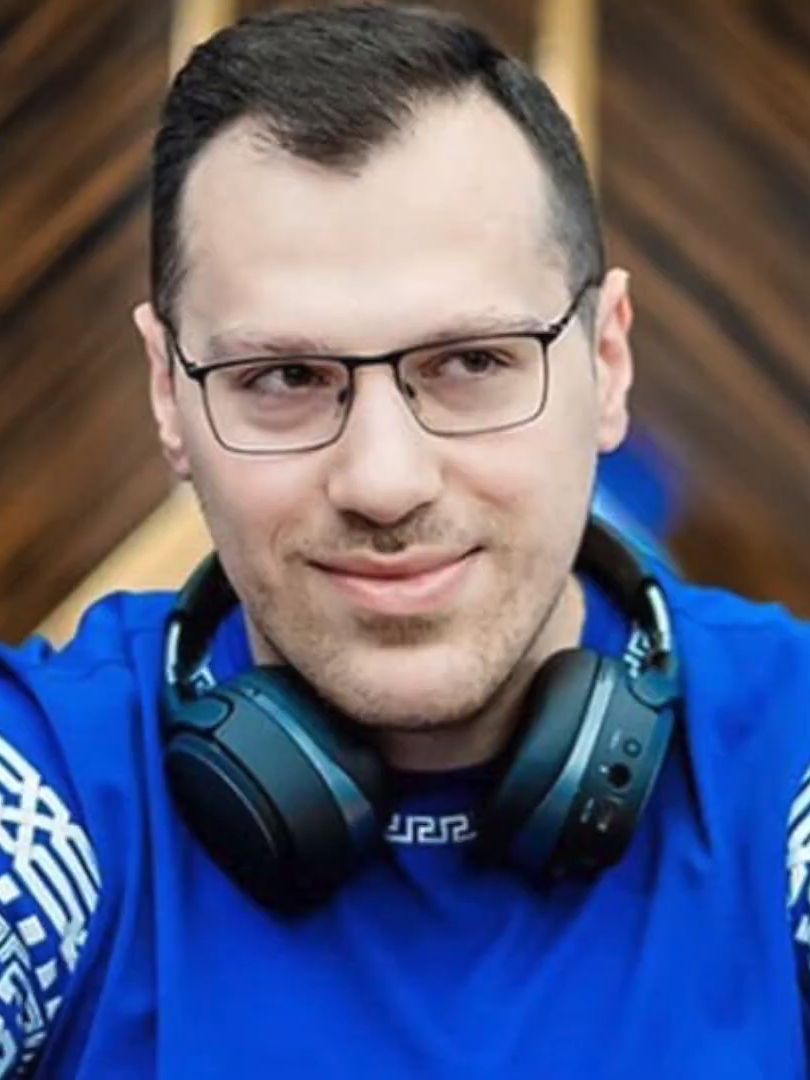
Artur Martirosian won his second bracelet of 2023 in Event 11

Online event.

#	Event	Entrants	Winner	Prize	Runner-up
1	$1,500 Mystery Millions	3,446	(South Korea) Jinhoon Lee (1/1)	$420,000	(United States) Max Pinnola
2	$1,425 Millionaire Maker in Paradise	3,496	(United States) Allan Mello (1/1)	$1,000,000	(Ukraine) Nazar Buhaiov
3	$25,000 GGMillion$ High Roller Championship	533	(Austria) Samuel Mullur (1/1)	$2,736,300	(United States) Frank Brannan
4	$1,000 Mini Main Event No-Limit Hold'em	2,234	(Canada) Martin Raus (1/1)	$334,380	(Czech Republic) Josef Snejberg
5	$25,000 High Roller Pot-Limit Omaha	140	(Greece) Nikolaos Lampropoulos (1/1)	$871,600	(United States) Dan Shak
6	$3,000 No-Limit Hold'em 6-Handed	755	(Bulgaria) Boris Kolev (1/2)	$424,550	(Australia) Daniel Neilson
7	$50,000 Super High Roller No-Limit Hold'em	137	(United States) Erik Seidel (1/10)	$1,704,400	(United States) Seth Gottlieb
8	$2,000 Mystery Bounty Pot-Limit Omaha Online	668	(Canada) Benjamin Wilinofsky (2/2)	$113,079	(Bangladesh) Asheque Elahi
9	$100,000 Ultra High Roller No-Limit Hold'em	111	(Japan) Masashi Oya (1/1)	$2,940,000	(United States) Jason Koon (0/1)
10	$5,000 Main Event Championship	3,010	(Germany) Stanislav Zegal (1/1)	$2,000,000	(Czech Republic) Michael Sklenicka
11	$740 Flip & Go	767	(Russia) Artur Martirosian (2/2)	$110,591	(South Korea) Dongwuk Moon
12	$1,000 No-Limit Hold'em Freezeout Online	1,336	(Belgium) Anton Bardziyan (1/1)	$178,261	(Brazil) Yuri Rodrigues
13	$10,000 Pot-Limit Omaha Championship	104	(Brazil) Dante Goya (1/1)	$277,700	(United States) Jim Collopy (1/3)
14	$2,000 The Closer Turbo Bounty	406	(Portugal) Bernardo Neves (1/1)	$166,000	(United Kingdom) Archibald Seaton
15	$10,000 High Roller No-Limit Hold'em 6-Handed	169	(China) Dong Chen (1/1)	$411,659	(France) Thomas Santerne

== Main Event ==
The $5,000 Main Event began on December 9 with the first of four starting flights. There was also an online flight held on GGPoker. The event featured a $15 million guaranteed prize pool.

The Main Event drew 3,010 total entries, generating a prize pool of $15,050,000. The top 447 players made the money, with the champion earning $2,000,000.

Stanislav Zegal, a German online qualifier, won the inaugural bracelet after defeating Michael Sklenicka heads-up. The final table also included Matt Glantz and WSOP bracelet winner Gabriel Schroeder.

=== Final Table ===
Name	Number of chips (percentage of total)	WSOP Bracelets	WSOP Cashes*	WSOP Earnings*
(Australia) Daniel Neilson	37,400,000 (24.9%)	0	42	$1,004,597
(Brazil) Gabriel Schroeder	28,000,000 (18.6%)	1	40	$389,125
(Germany) Stanislav Zegal	28,000,000 (18.6%)	0	7	$9,759
(Portugal) Rui Sousa	20,700,000 (13.8%)	0	12	$55,626
(Czech Republic) Michael Sklenicka	16,000,000 (10.6%)	0	9	$334,593
(United States) Matt Glantz	15,500,000 (10.3%)	0	75	$3,612,513
(United Kingdom) Montgomery McQuade	4,900,000 (3.3%)	0	0	0

*Career statistics prior to the start of the 2023 WSOP Paradise Main Event

=== Final Table results ===
Place	Name	Prize
1st	(Germany) Stanislav Zegal	$2,000,000
2nd	(Czech Republic) Michael Sklenicka	$1,200,000
3rd	(Australia) Daniel Neilson	$900,000
4th	(United States) Matt Glantz	$685,000
5th	(Portugal) Rui Sousa	$510,000
6th	(Brazil) Gabriel Schroeder	$400,000
7th	(United Kingdom) Montgomery McQuade	$300,000
8th	(United States) Luke Graham	$250,000

=== Other notable high finishes ===
NB: This list is restricted to top 100 finishers with an existing Wikipedia entry.

Place	Name	Prize
10th	(Belarus) Mikita Badziakouski	$150,000
20th	(Canada) Timothy Adams	$90,000
35th	(United States) David Peters	$58,300
39th	(Canada) Sam Greenwood	$58,300
46th	(Italy) Mustapha Kanit	$47,500
71st	(Spain) Adrián Mateos	$26,800
87th	(United States) Daniel Weinman	$19,000
91st	(Belgium) Davidi Kitai	$19,000
98th	(Canada) Daniel Negreanu	$19,000
