= Alex Livingston =

Canadian poker player

- Born: 1987 (age 38–39); Halifax, Nova Scotia, Canada
- Education: Tufts University
- Occupations: Poker player
- Poker career
- Allegiance: Canada
- Stake: High-stakes
- Years active: 2011-
- Professionality: Crusher
- Known for: 3rd in the $10,000 No Limit Hold'em - WSOP Main Event (2019)
- Bracelets: $1,500 Seven Card Stud (Event #9) (2022) $3,000 Pot Limit Omaha - 6-Handed (Bracelet Event #97) (2024)

Alex Livingston (born 1987) is a Canadian poker player. In 2019, he placed third in the World Series of Poker Main Event, earning $4 million. He finished 13th at the Main Event in 2013. Livingston was raised in Halifax, Nova Scotia. He is also a chess player and studied economics at Tufts University. Livingston won his maiden bracelet in a $1,500 Seven Card Stud tournament at the 2022 WSOP and then won his second bracelet at the 2024 WSOP in the $3,000 Pot-Limit Omaha 6-Handed event. He is a coach at the poker training sites PokerCoaching.com and Mixed Minds.

As of 2026, his total live tournament winnings exceed $10,300,000.
