= 2016 World Series of Poker results =

Below are the results of the 2016 World Series of Poker, held from May 31-July 18 at the Rio All Suite Hotel and Casino in Paradise, Nevada.

== Key ==
*	Elected to the Poker Hall of Fame
(#/#)	This denotes a bracelet winner. The first number is the number of bracelets won in the 2016 WSOP. The second number is the total number of bracelets won. Both numbers represent totals as of that point during the tournament.
Place	What place each player at the final table finished
Name	The player who made it to the final table
Prize (US$)	The amount of money awarded for each finish at the event's final table

== Results ==
=== Event #1: $565 Casino Employees No Limit Hold'em ===
- 2-Day Event: June 1–2
- Number of Entries: 731
- Total Prize Pool: $365,500
- Number of Payouts: 110
- Winning Hand: K♠ K♥

Final Table
Place	Name	Prize
1st	Christopher Sand (1/1)	$75,157
2nd	Kerryjane Craigie	$46,420
3rd	Michael Coombs	$32,249
4th	Spencer Bennett	$22,753
5th	Brian Mikesh	$16,308
6th	Tom Ratanakul	$11,877
7th	Nicholas Sliwinski	$8,792
8th	Tiankang Xing	$6,616
9th	Robert Ostler	$5,063

=== Event #2: $565 Colossus II No Limit Hold'em ===
- 6-Day Event: June 2–7
- Number of Entries: 21,613
- Total Prize Pool: $10,806,500
- Number of Payouts: 2,922
- Winning Hand: J♠ J♣

Final Table
Place	Name	Prize
1st	Ben Keeline (1/1)	$1,000,000
2nd	Jiri Horak	$618,000
3rd	Farhad Davoudzadeh	$462,749
4th	Richard Carr	$348,462
5th	Marek Ohnisko	$263,962
6th	Christopher Renaudette	$201,151
7th	Alex Benjamen	$154,208
8th	Jonathan Borenstein	$118,937
9th	Xiu Deng	$92,291

=== Event #3: $10,000 Seven Card Stud Championship ===
- 3-Day Event: June 4–6
- Number of Entries: 87
- Total Prize Pool: $817,800
- Number of Payouts: 14
- Winning Hand: A♦ A♣ 9♥ 6♣ A♠ 8♠ Q♦

Final Table
Place	Name	Prize
1st	Robert Mizrachi (1/4)	$242,662
2nd	Matt Grapenthien (0/1)	$149,976
3rd	George Danzer (0/3)	$103,230
4th	Ted Forrest (0/6)	$72,971
5th	Steve Weiss	$53,012
6th	David Benyamine (0/1)	$39,611
7th	Bill Chen (0/2)	$30,466
8th	Calvin Anderson (0/1)	$24,142

=== Event #4: $1,000 Top Up Turbo No Limit Hold'em ===
- 2-Day Event: June 5–6
- Number of Entries: 667
- Total Prize Pool: $681,300
- Number of Payouts: 101
- Winning Hand: 4♥ 4♠

Final Table
Place	Name	Prize
1st	Kyle Julius (1/1)	$142,972
2nd	Bart Lybaert	$88,328
3rd	Ben Yu (0/1)	$61,137
4th	Karl Held	$43,001
5th	Hugo Perez	$30,742
6th	Christian Blech	$22,345
7th	Nitis Udornpim	$16,518
8th	George Dolofan	$12,422
9th	Vinny Pahuja	$9,506

=== Event #5: $1,500 Dealers Choice Six-Handed ===
- 3-Day Event: June 5–7
- Number of Entries: 389
- Total Prize Pool: $525,150
- Number of Payouts: 59
- Winning Hand: 9♥ 7♦ 4♣ 2♣ (Omaha Hi-Lo)

Final Table
Place	Name	Prize
1st	Lawrence Berg (1/1)	$125,466
2nd	Yueqi Zhu	$77,526
3rd	Andrew Brown (0/1)	$50,250
4th	Paul Volpe (0/1)	$33,393
5th	Joseph Couden	$22,765
6th	John Templeton	$15,932

=== Event #6: $1,500 No Limit Hold'em ===
- 4-Day Event: June 6–9
- Number of Entries: 2,016
- Total Prize Pool: $2,721,600
- Number of Payouts: 303
- Winning Hand: K♥ J♥

Final Table
Place	Name	Prize
1st	Peter Eichhardt (1/1)	$438,417
2nd	Davis Aalvik	$270,842
3rd	Michael Addamo	$196,202
4th	John Racener	$143,563
5th	Tim Farrelly	$106,115
6th	Bruno Borges	$79,241
7th	Raymond Phu	$59,787
8th	Anthony Zinno (0/1)	$45,582
9th	Richard Dubini	$35,121

=== Event #7: $1,500 2-7 No Limit Draw Lowball ===
- 3-Day Event: June 6–8
- Number of Entries: 279
- Total Prize Pool: $376,650
- Number of Payouts: 42
- Winning Hand: 10♦ 7♠ 6♦ 4♣ 3♣

Final Table
Place	Name	Prize
1st	Ryan D'Angelo (1/1)	$92,338
2nd	John Monnette (0/2)	$57,061
3rd	Tom Franklin (0/1)	$38,582
4th	Dan Kelly (0/2)	$26,632
5th	Konstantin Maslak (0/1)	$18,775
6th	Todd Barlow	$13,524
7th	Alex Dovzhenko	$9,959

=== Event #8: $1,500 H.O.R.S.E. ===
- 3-Day Event: June 7–9
- Number of Entries: 778
- Total Prize Pool: $1,050,300
- Number of Payouts: 117
- Winning Hand: 7♣ 3♣ 3♠ A♥ 9♦ K♣ A♦ (Seven Card Stud)

Final Table
Place	Name	Prize
1st	Ian Johns (1/2)	$212,604
2nd	Justin Bonomo (0/1)	$131,412
3rd	Christopher Vitch	$92,374
4th	Noah Bronstein	$65,866
5th	Georgios Sotiropoulos (0/1)	$47,651
6th	Andre Akkari (0/1)	$34,984
7th	Svetlana Gromenkova (0/1)	$26,070
8th	Scotty Nguyen* (0/5)	$19,724

=== Event #9: $10,000 Heads Up No Limit Hold'em Championship ===
- 3-Day Event: June 7–9
- Number of Entries: 153
- Total Prize Pool: $1,188,200
- Number of Payouts: 16
- Winning Hand: 8♥ 7♦

Final Table
Place	Name	Prize
1st	Alan Percal (1/1)	$320,574
2nd	John Smith	$198,192
SF	Alex Luneau	$123,929
SF	Olivier Busquet	$123,929
QF	Matthew Diehl	$56,202
QF	Nick Yunis	$56,202
QF	Benjamin Geisman	$56,202
QF	Orlando Romero	$56,202

=== Event #10: $1,500 Six-Handed No Limit Hold'em ===
- 3-Day Event: June 8–10
- Number of Entries: 1,477
- Total Prize Pool: $1,993,950
- Number of Payouts: 222
- Winning Hand: K♦ Q♣

Final Table
Place	Name	Prize
1st	Mike Cordell (1/1)	$346,088
2nd	Pierre Neuville	$213,837
3rd	Robert Hankins	$148,885
4th	Lutz Klinkhammer	$105,063
5th	Javier Garcirreynaldos	$75,154
6th	Thomas Cha	$54,507

=== Event #11: $10,000 Dealers Choice Six-Handed Championship ===
- 3-Day Event: June 8–10
- Number of Entries: 118
- Total Prize Pool: $1,109,200
- Number of Payouts: 18
- Winning Hand: 4♠ 2♣ (No Limit Hold'em)

Final Table
Place	Name	Prize
1st	Jean Gaspard (1/1)	$306,621
2nd	William O'Neil	$189,505
3rd	John Monnette (0/2)	$135,061
4th	Randy Ohel (0/1)	$96,876
5th	Mikhail Semin	$69,937
6th	Viacheslav Zhukov (0/2)	$50,818

=== Event #12: $565 Pot Limit Omaha ===
- 3-Day Event: June 9–11
- Number of Entries: 2,483
- Total Prize Pool: $1,241,500
- Number of Payouts: 373
- Winning Hand: A♥ Q♠ 7♥ 6♠

Final Table
Place	Name	Prize
1st	Ryan Laplante (1/1)	$190,328
2nd	Sean Shah	$117,531
3rd	Tesfaldet Tekle	$85,870
4th	Richard St. Peter	$63,304
5th	Charles Coultas	$47,092
6th	Adil Khan	$35,353
7th	Matthew Livingston	$26,786
8th	Darryll Fish	$20,484
9th	Grant Ellis	$15,813

=== Event #13: $1,500 Seven Card Razz ===
- 3-Day Event: June 9–11
- Number of Entries: 461
- Total Prize Pool: $622,350
- Number of Payouts: 70
- Winning Hand: A♦ 9♣ 10♦ 4♦ 8♣ Q J

Final Table
Place	Name	Prize
1st	Rep Porter (1/3)	$142,624
2nd	Michael Gathy (0/2)	$88,146
3rd	Alexey Makarov	$60,309
4th	Daniel Negreanu* (0/6)	$42,030
5th	Brendan Taylor (0/1)	$29,846
6th	Valentin Vornicu	$21,604
7th	Daniel Weinman	$15,945
8th	Shaun Deeb (0/1)	$12,006

=== Event #14: $1,500 Millionaire Maker No Limit Hold'em ===
- 5-Day Event: June 10–14
- Number of Entries: 7,190
- Total Prize Pool: $9,706,500
- Number of Payouts: 1,079
- Winning Hand: K♣ 8♣

Final Table
Place	Name	Prize
1st	Jason DeWitt (1/2)	$1,065,403
2nd	Garrett Greer	$1,000,000
3rd	Lisa Meredith	$500,000
4th	Frank Rusnak	$366,787
5th	Luke Brereton	$276,632
6th	Arkadiy Tsinis (0/1)	$210,112
7th	Mikhail Semin	$160,725
8th	Alessio DiCesare	$123,828
9th	Stanley Lee	$96,091

=== Event #15: $1,500 Eight Game Mix ===
- 3-Day Event: June 10–12
- Number of Entries: 491
- Total Prize Pool: $662,850
- Number of Payouts: 74
- Winning Hand: A♣ K♠ Q♦ 4♠ (Pot Limit Omaha)

Final Table
Place	Name	Prize
1st	Paul Volpe (1/2)	$149,943
2nd	Jason Stockfish	$92,638
3rd	Ron Ware	$60,882
4th	Benjamin Ludlow	$40,911
5th	Tony Lazar	$28,123
6th	Gavin Smith (0/1)	$19,787

=== Event #16: $10,000 2-7 No Limit Draw Lowball Championship ===
- 3-Day Event: June 11–13
- Number of Entries: 100
- Total Prize Pool: $940,000
- Number of Payouts: 15
- Winning Hand: 8♠ 6♦ 5♦ 3♣ 2♣

Final Table
Place	Name	Prize
1st	Jason Mercier (1/4)	$273,335
2nd	Mike Watson	$168,936
3rd	Lamar Wilkinson	$120,025
4th	David Grey (0/2)	$86,302
5th	Benny Glaser (0/1)	$62,810
6th	Stephen Chidwick	$46,277
7th	Alex Luneau	$34,522

=== Event #17: $1,000 No Limit Hold'em ===
- 3-Day Event: June 12–14
- Number of Entries: 2,242
- Total Prize Pool: $2,017,800
- Number of Payouts: 337
- Winning Hand: 8♦ 8♥

Final Table
Place	Name	Prize
1st	Chase Bianchi (1/1)	$316,920
2nd	Erik Silberman	$195,738
3rd	Roberto Romanello	$142,926
4th	Charles Carragher	$105,308
5th	Paul Nunez	$78,301
6th	James Alexander	$58,758
7th	Felix Morin-Dutil	$44,503
8th	Cameron Rezaie	$34,024
9th	Christopher Leong	$26,259

=== Event #18: $3,000 H.O.R.S.E. ===
- 3-Day Event: June 12–14
- Number of Entries: 400
- Total Prize Pool: $1,092,000
- Number of Payouts: 60
- Winning Hand: A♥ Q♥ J♠ 10♣ 8♦ 7♠ K♠ (Seven Card Stud)

Final Table
Place	Name	Prize
1st	Marco Johnson (1/2)	$259,730
2nd	Jared Talarico	$160,522
3rd	Gerald Ringe (0/1)	$108,924
4th	Todd Ickow	$75,397
5th	Glenn Engelbert	$53,259
6th	John Crisp	$38,409
7th	Toma Kalaj	$28,291
8th	David Rheem	$21,294

=== Event #19: $1,000 Pot Limit Omaha ===
- 3-Day Event: June 13–15
- Number of Entries: 1,106
- Total Prize Pool: $995,400
- Number of Payouts: 166
- Winning Hand: A♣ K♠ 3♣ 2♣

Final Table
Place	Name	Prize
1st	Sam Soverel (1/1)	$185,317
2nd	Kirby Lowery	$114,486
3rd	Garrett Garvin	$81,080
4th	Zachary Hench	$58,164
5th	Bruno Borges	$42,270
6th	Jeffrey Landherr	$31,126
7th	Jared Koppel	$23,228
8th	Henri Ojala	$17,570
9th	Juuso Leppanen	$13,474

=== Event #20: $10,000 Seven Card Razz Championship ===
- 3-Day Event: June 13–15
- Number of Entries: 100
- Total Prize Pool: $940,000
- Number of Payouts: 15
- Winning Hand: 10♣ 9♣ 9♠ 8♦ 7♥ 7♦ 6♠

Final Table
Place	Name	Prize
1st	Ray Dehkharghani (1/1)	$273,338
2nd	Jason Mercier (1/4)	$168,936
3rd	Yueqi Zhu	$116,128
4th	Brian Hastings (0/3)	$82,078
5th	Robert Campbell	$59,694
6th	John Racener	$44,712
7th	Bart Hanson	$34,521
8th	Jyri Merivirta	$27,499

=== Event #21: $3,000 Six-Handed No Limit Hold'em ===
- 4-Day Event: June 14–17
- Number of Entries: 1,029
- Total Prize Pool: $2,809,170
- Number of Payouts: 155
- Winning Hand: Q♠ 7♦

Final Table
Place	Name	Prize
1st	Calvin Lee (1/1)	$531,577
2nd	Steven Thompson	$328,487
3rd	Mark Herm	$224,805
4th	Will Givens (0/1)	$156,281
5th	Martin Kozlov	$110,389
6th	Alex Queen	$79,246

=== Event #22: $1,500 Limit Hold'em ===
- 3-Day Event: June 14–16
- Number of Entries: 665
- Total Prize Pool: $897,750
- Number of Payouts: 100
- Winning Hand: 7♥ 2♦

Final Table
Place	Name	Prize
1st	Danny Le (1/1)	$188,815
2nd	Scott Farnsworth	$116,663
3rd	Tyler Bonkowski (0/1)	$80,706
4th	Dave Tobin	$56,740
5th	Dale Eberle	$40,550
6th	Dustin Bush	$29,466
7th	Andrew Beversdorf	$21,778
8th	Daniel Huseman	$16,376
9th	Esmeralda Villafuerte	$12,532

=== Event #23: $2,000 No Limit Hold'em ===
- 4-Day Event: June 15–18
- Number of Entries: 1,419
- Total Prize Pool: $2,554,200
- Number of Payouts: 213
- Winning Hand: A♣ 6♦

Final Table
Place	Name	Prize
1st	Cesar Garcia (1/1)	$447,739
2nd	Viliyan Petleshkov	$276,660
3rd	Yuriy Boyko	$198,185
4th	Adrian Buckley (0/1)	$143,598
5th	Kamel Mokhammad	$105,253
6th	Craig McCorkell (0/1)	$78,053
7th	Craig Varnell	$58,569
8th	Thiago Nishijima (0/1)	$44,478
9th	Anthony Spinella (0/1)	$34,188

=== Event #24: $10,000 H.O.R.S.E. Championship ===
- 3-Day Event: June 15–17
- Number of Entries: 171
- Total Prize Pool: $1,607,400
- Number of Payouts: 26
- Winning Hand: 5♣ 3♥ (Limit Hold'em)

Final Table
Place	Name	Prize
1st	Jason Mercier (2/5)	$422,874
2nd	James Obst	$261,354
3rd	Nick Schulman (0/2)	$183,779
4th	Adam Friedman (0/1)	$131,519
5th	Mikhail Semin	$95,817
6th	Jesse Martin (0/1)	$71,089
7th	Yuval Bronshtein	$53,729
8th	Bryn Kenney (0/1)	$41,383

=== Event #25: $2,500 No Limit Hold'em ===
- 3-Day Event: June 16–18
- Number of Entries: 1,045
- Total Prize Pool: $2,377,375
- Number of Payouts: 157
- Winning Hand: A♥ 9♠

Final Table
Place	Name	Prize
1st	Michael Gagliano (1/1)	$448,463
2nd	Daniel Cooke	$277,128
3rd	Shankar Pillai (0/1)	$196,119
4th	Remi Castaignon	$140,596
5th	Zu Zhou	$102,120
6th	Niall Farrell	$75,164
7th	Michael Laake	$56,073
8th	Darryll Fish	$42,405
9th	Gavin O'Rourke	$32,514

=== Event #26: $1,500 Omaha Hi-Low Split-8 or Better ===
- 3-Day Event: June 16–18
- Number of Entries: 934
- Total Prize Pool: $1,260,900
- Number of Payouts: 141
- Winning Hand: Q♦ J♦ 9♣ 7♦

Final Table
Place	Name	Prize
1st	Benny Glaser (1/2)	$244,103
2nd	Benjamin Gold	$150,828
3rd	Motohiro Kondo	$106,070
4th	Phil Hui (0/1)	$75,627
5th	Brandon Shack-Harris (0/1)	$54,680
6th	Zachary Milchman	$40,098
7th	Ilya Krupin	$29,830
8th	Max Pescatori (0/4)	$22,517
9th	Scott Packer	$17,250

=== Event #27: $1,000 Seniors No Limit Hold'em Championship ===
- 4-Day Event: June 17–20
- Number of Entries: 4,499
- Total Prize Pool: $4,049,100
- Number of Payouts: 675
- Winning Hand: 4♦ 4♣

Final Table
Place	Name	Prize
1st	Johnnie Craig (1/1)	$538,204
2nd	Jamshid Lotfi	$332,413
3rd	Roger Sippl	$245,389
4th	Joseph Somerville	$182,536
5th	Wesley Chong	$136,829
6th	Paul Runge	$103,366
7th	Eugene Solomon	$78,699
8th	Mike Lisanti	$60,392
9th	Alan Cutler	$46,713

=== Event #28: $10,000 Limit Hold'em Championship ===
- 3-Day Event: June 17–19
- Number of Entries: 110
- Total Prize Pool: $1,034,000
- Number of Payouts: 17
- Winning Hand: K♦ 8♦

Final Table
Place	Name	Prize
1st	Ian Johns (2/3)	$290,635
2nd	Sean Berrios	$179,625
3rd	Alexander Balynskiy	$125,571
4th	David Chiu (0/5)	$89,810
5th	Jeff Thompson	$65,752
6th	Bill Chen (0/2)	$49,304
7th	Brock Parker (0/3)	$37,888
8th	Brian Rast (0/2)	$29,855
9th	Anh Van Nguyen	$24,140

=== Event #29: $1,500 No Limit Hold'em ===
- 4-Day Event: June 18–21
- Number of Entries: 1,796
- Total Prize Pool: $2,424,600
- Number of Payouts: 270
- Winning Hand: K♠ 8♣

Final Table
Place	Name	Prize
1st	Alexander Ziskin (1/1)	$401,494
2nd	Jens Grieme	$248,067
3rd	Kam Low	$179,187
4th	Patrick Powers	$130,780
5th	Severin Schleser	$96,452
6th	Craig Mason	$71,891
7th	Marino Mura	$54,160
8th	David Juenemann	$41,244
9th	Aaron Kweskin	$31,754

=== Event #30: $3,000 Six-Handed Pot Limit Omaha ===
- 3-Day Event: June 18–20
- Number of Entries: 580
- Total Prize Pool: $1,583,400
- Number of Payouts: 87
- Winning Hand: 10♠ 9♦ 8♠ 4♣

Final Table
Place	Name	Prize
1st	Viatcheslav Ortynskiy (1/1)	$344,327
2nd	Rafael Lebron	$212,779
3rd	Randy Ohel (0/1)	$141,187
4th	Matthew Humphrey	$95,623
5th	George Wolff	$66,134
6th	Joshua Gibson	$46,727

=== Event #31: $1,000 Super Seniors No Limit Hold'em ===
- 3-Day Event: June 19–21
- Number of Entries: 1,476
- Total Prize Pool: $1,328,400
- Number of Payouts: 222
- Winning Hand: Q♥ J♦

Final Table
Place	Name	Prize
1st	James Moore (1/1)	$230,626
2nd	Charles Barker	$142,461
3rd	Steven Krupnick	$102,052
4th	Charles Rinn	$73,943
5th	Eugene Spinner	$54,197
6th	Fred Berger (0/1)	$40,191
7th	Arthur Loring	$30,159
8th	James Parrott	$22,902
9th	Vern Soeldner	$17,604

=== Event #32: $10,000 Omaha Hi-Low Split-8 or Better Championship ===
- 4-Day Event: June 19–22
- Number of Entries: 163
- Total Prize Pool: $1,532,200
- Number of Payouts: 25
- Winning Hand: J♦ 6♣ 3♣ 3♦

Final Table
Place	Name	Prize
1st	Benny Glaser (2/3)	$407,194
2nd	Doug Lorgeree	$251,665
3rd	Matt Glantz	$175,754
4th	Grzegorz Trelski	$125,125
5th	Robert Campbell	$90,846
6th	Per Hildebrand	$67,291
7th	Todd Brunson (0/1)	$50.872
8th	Jason Mercier (2/5)	$39,269
9th	Felipe Ramos	$30,965

=== Event #33: $1,500 Summer Solstice No Limit Hold'em ===
- 5-Day Event: June 20–24
- Number of Entries: 1,840
- Total Prize Pool: $2,484,000
- Number of Payouts: 276
- Winning Hand: 4♣ 4♥

Final Table
Place	Name	Prize
1st	Adrian Mateos (1/2)	$409,171
2nd	Koray Aldemir	$252,805
3rd	Alessandro Borsa	$182,835
4th	Ralph Wong	$133,588
5th	Jon Turner	$98,617
6th	Jackson White	$73,563
7th	Ronald McGinnity	$55,455
8th	Stephen Ladowsky	$42,252
9th	David Tovar	$32,540

=== Event #34: $1,500 2-7 Limit Triple Draw Lowball ===
- 3-Day Event: June 20–22
- Number of Entries: 358
- Total Prize Pool: $483,300
- Number of Payouts: 54
- Winning Hand: 9♥ 8♦ 7♠ 6♦ 4♠

Final Table
Place	Name	Prize
1st	Andrey Zaichenko (1/1)	$117,947
2nd	Jameson Painter	$72,878
3rd	Guy Hareuveni	$46,992
4th	Alexsandr Vinskii	$31,099
5th	Adam Spiegelberg	$21,139
6th	Andrii Nadieliaiev	$14,769

=== Event #35: $5,000 Six-Handed No Limit Hold'em ===
- 3-Day Event: June 21–23
- Number of Entries: 541
- Total Prize Pool: $2,542,700
- Number of Payouts: 82
- Winning Hand: K♥ J♦

Final Table
Place	Name	Prize
1st	Michael Gathy (1/3)	$560,843
2nd	Adrien Allain	$346,632
3rd	Manuel Saavedra	$229,990
4th	Blake Eastman	$155,762
5th	Scott Margereson	$107,723
6th	Thi Nguyen	$76,112

=== Event #36: $2,500 Mixed Omaha/Seven Card Stud Hi-Lo 8 or Better ===
- 3-Day Event: June 21–23
- Number of Entries: 394
- Total Prize Pool: $896,350
- Number of Payouts: 60
- Winning Hand: 3♠ 9♦ 3♣ 9♣ 5♣ A♥ 10♥

Final Table
Place	Name	Prize
1st	Hani Awad (1/1)	$213,186
2nd	Fabrice Soulier (0/1)	$131,762
3rd	Aditya Prasetyo	$89,409
4th	Denny Axel	$61,888
5th	Michael Chow (0/1)	$43,717
6th	Gleb Kovtunov	$31,527
7th	Per Hildebrand	$23,222
8th	Timothy Burt	$17,479

=== Event #37: $1,500 Pot Limit Omaha ===
- 3-Day Event: June 22–24
- Number of Entries: 776
- Total Prize Pool: $1,047,600
- Number of Payouts: 117
- Winning Hand: A♠ Q♠ Q♣ 10♦

Final Table
Place	Name	Prize
1st	Jiaqi Xu (1/1)	$212,128
2nd	Jeffrey Duvall	$131,073
3rd	Pallas Aidinian	$91,369
4th	Joshua Pham	$64,654
5th	Tommy Le	$46,452
6th	Richard Austin (0/1)	$33,895
7th	Jon Ho Christensen	$25,123
8th	Thibaut Klinghammer	$18,922
9th	Bryce Eckhart	$14,484

=== Event #38: $3,000 Six-Handed Limit Hold'em ===
- 3-Day Event: June 22–24
- Number of Entries: 245
- Total Prize Pool: $668,850
- Number of Payouts: 37
- Winning Hand: 6♦ 5♥

Final Table
Place	Name	Prize
1st	Rafael Lebron (1/1)	$169,337
2nd	Georgios Zisimopoulos	$104,646
3rd	Brad Libson	$68,896
4th	Joe McKeehen (0/1)	$46,489
5th	Matt Matros (0/3)	$32,172
6th	Alex Queen	$22,848

=== Event #39: $10,000 Six-Handed No Limit Hold'em Championship ===
- 3-Day Event: June 23–25
- Number of Entries: 294
- Total Prize Pool: $2,763,600
- Number of Payouts: 45
- Winning Hand: Q♣ Q♦

Final Table
Place	Name	Prize
1st	Martin Kozlov (1/1)	$665,709
2nd	Davidi Kitai (0/3)	$411,441
3rd	Justin Bonomo (0/1)	$271,856
4th	Chris Ferguson (0/5)	$183,989
5th	Nick Petrangelo (0/1)	$127,622
6th	Jack Salter	$90,783

=== Event #40: $2,500 Mixed Limit Triple Draw Lowball ===
- 3-Day Event: June 23–25
- Number of Entries: 236
- Total Prize Pool: $536,900
- Number of Payouts: 36
- Winning Hand: A-7-5-3-2

Final Table
Place	Name	Prize
1st	Christopher Vitch (1/1)	$136,854
2nd	Sigi Stockinger	$84,572
3rd	David Gee	$55,511
4th	Damjan Radanov	$37,375
5th	Michael Schiffman	$25,830
6th	Gary Benson (0/1)	$18,336

=== Event #41: $1,500 Monster Stack No Limit Hold'em ===
- 5-Day Event: June 24–28
- Number of Entries: 6,927
- Total Prize Pool: $9,351,450
- Number of Payouts: 1,040
- Winning Hand: A♦ 7♣

Final Table
Place	Name	Prize
1st	Mitchell Towner (1/1)	$1,120,196
2nd	Dorian Rios	$692,029
3rd	Stephen Nussrallah	$513,902
4th	Daniel DiPasquale	$384,338
5th	David Pham (0/2)	$289,497
6th	Andrew Moreno	$219,632
7th	David Valcourt	$167,838
8th	Marshall White	$129,197
9th	Cody Pack	$100,185

=== Event #42: $3,000 Shootout No Limit Hold'em ===
- 3-Day Event: June 24–26
- Number of Entries: 400
- Total Prize Pool: $1,092,600
- Number of Payouts: 40
- Winning Hand: Q♠ Q♥

Final Table
Place	Name	Prize
1st	Phillip McAllister (1/1)	$267,720
2nd	Kyle Montgomery	$165,450
3rd	Christopher Kruk	$119,686
4th	Maria Ho	$87,487
5th	Andreas Freund	$64,628
6th	Marcos Antunes	$48,252
7th	Jesse Yaginuma	$36,416
8th	Rhys Jones	$27,783
9th	Faraz Jaka	$21,431
10th	Stephen Chidwick	$16,717

=== Event #43: $10,000 Seven Card Stud Hi-Lo Split-8 or Better Championship ===
- 3-Day Event: June 25–27
- Number of Entries: 136
- Total Prize Pool: $1,278,400
- Number of Payouts: 21
- Winning Hand: J♣ 4♠ 4♣ 2♠ 10♦ 2♦ 8♦

Final Table
Place	Name	Prize
1st	George Danzer (1/4)	$338,646
2nd	Randy Ohel (0/1)	$209,302
3rd	Justin Bonomo (0/1)	$148,601
4th	Esther Taylor-Brady	$107,551
5th	Todd Brunson (0/1)	$79,381
6th	Eli Elezra (0/3)	$59,773
7th	Scott Clements (0/2)	$45,935
8th	David Grey (0/2)	$36,044

=== Event #44: $1,000 No Limit Hold'em ===
- 4-Day Event: June 26–29
- Number of Entries: 2,076
- Total Prize Pool: $1,868,400
- Number of Payouts: 312
- Winning Hand: 8♣ 8♥

Final Table
Place	Name	Prize
1st	Steven Wolansky (1/2)	$298,849
2nd	Wenlong Jin	$184,631
3rd	Bradley Myers	$133,955
4th	Young Sik Eum	$98,150
5th	Justin Zaki	$72,634
6th	Dejan Boskovic	$54,294
7th	Walter Rodriguez	$40,999
8th	Zaher Sayegh	$31,278
9th	Danny Illingworth	$24,111

=== Event #45: $1,500 Mixed No Limit Hold'em/Pot Limit Omaha ===
- 3-Day Event: June 26–28
- Number of Entries: 919
- Total Prize Pool: $1,240,650
- Number of Payouts: 138
- Winning Hand: A♦ 9♦

Final Table
Place	Name	Prize
1st	Loren Klein (1/1)	$241,427
2nd	Dmitry Savelyev	$149,177
3rd	Rick Alvarado	$104,784
4th	Michael Noori	$74,634
5th	Matthew Humphrey	$53,915
6th	Eric Penner	$39,510
7th	Alexandr Orlov	$29,378
8th	David Callaghan	$22,168
9th	Steven Gagliano	$16,980

=== Event #46: $1,500 Bounty No Limit Hold'em ===
- 4-Day Event: June 27–30
- Number of Entries: 2,158
- Total Prize Pool: $1,834,300
- Number of Payouts: 324
- Winning Hand: A♣ 4♣

Final Table
Place	Name	Prize
1st	Kristen Bicknell (1/2)	$290,768
2nd	Norbert Szecsi (0/1)	$179,625
3rd	John Myung	$130,588
4th	Ryan Leng	$95,857
5th	Will Failla	$71,049
6th	Sebastien Comel	$53,181
7th	Steve Gee (0/1)	$40,203
8th	Fadi Hamad	$30,697
9th	Jason Singleton	$23,678

=== Event #47: $10,000 2-7 Limit Triple Draw Lowball Championship ===
- 3-Day Event: June 27–29
- Number of Entries: 125
- Total Prize Pool: $1,175,000
- Number of Payouts: 19
- Winning Hand: J♣ 6♥ 5♦ 4♦ 2♥

Final Table
Place	Name	Prize
1st	John Hennigan (1/4)	$320,103
2nd	Michael Gathy (1/3)	$197,838
3rd	J.C. Tran (0/2)	$142,547
4th	Chris Klodnicki	$102,910
5th	Viacheslav Zhukov (0/2)	$74,439
6th	Abe Mosseri (0/1)	$53,951

=== Event #48: $5,000 No Limit Hold'em ===
- 2-Day Event: June 28–29
- Number of Entries: 524
- Total Prize Pool: $2,462,000
- Number of Payouts: 79
- Winning Hand: J♦ J♥

Final Table
Place	Name	Prize
1st	Ankush Mandavia (1/1)	$548,139
2nd	Daniel Strelitz	$338,774
3rd	Christian Nilles	$232,934
4th	Thiago Macedo	$162,924
5th	Pedro Oliveira	$115,957
6th	Sean Getzwiller (0/1)	$84,004
7th	Sergey Lebedev	$61,964
8th	Phil Hellmuth* (0/14)	$46,553
9th	Kyle Julius (1/1)	$35,636

=== Event #49: $1,500 Seven Card Stud ===
- 3-Day Event: June 28–30
- Number of Entries: 331
- Total Prize Pool: $446,850
- Number of Payouts: 50
- Winning Hand: 10♣ 10♥ 8♦ 7♦ J♥ 5♦ 5♥

Final Table
Place	Name	Prize
1st	Shaun Deeb (1/2)	$111,101
2nd	Adam Friedman (0/1)	$68,666
3rd	Max Pescatori (0/4)	$46,312
4th	Katherine Fleck	$31,899
5th	Eugene Katchalov (0/1)	$22,448
6th	Yaniv Birman	$16,147
7th	John Monnette (0/2)	$11,878
8th	Cory Zeidman (0/1)	$8,941

=== Event #50: $1,500 Shootout No Limit Hold'em ===
- 3-Day Event: June 29-July 1
- Number of Entries: 1,050
- Total Prize Pool: $1,417,500
- Number of Payouts: 120
- Winning Hand: A♥ 6♥

Final Table
Place	Name	Prize
1st	Safiya Umerova (1/1)	$264,046
2nd	Niall Farrell	$163,158
3rd	Michael Mixer	$118,109
4th	Yuliyan Kolev	$86,513
5th	Damian Salas	$64,129
6th	Raymond Ho	$48,115
7th	Daniel McAulay	$36,543
8th	Daniel Tang	$28,101
9th	Alexander Lakhov	$21,881

=== Event #51: $10,000 Eight-Handed Pot Limit Omaha Championship ===
- 4-Day Event: June 29-July 2
- Number of Entries: 400
- Total Prize Pool: $3,760,000
- Number of Payouts: 60
- Winning Hand: A♦ 10♦ 6♦ 4♦

Final Table
Place	Name	Prize
1st	Brandon Shack-Harris (1/2)	$894,300
2nd	Loren Klein (1/1)	$552,713
3rd	Tommy Le	$376,667
4th	Melad Marji	$261,652
5th	Matthew Parry	$185,337
6th	Harley Stoffmaker	$133,918
7th	Junayed Khan	$98,748
8th	Dominique Mosley	$74,339

=== Event #52: $3,000 No Limit Hold'em ===
- 4-Day Event: June 30-July 3
- Number of Entries: 1,125
- Total Prize Pool: $3,071,250
- Number of Payouts: 169
- Winning Hand: 6♣ 5♦

Final Table
Place	Name	Prize
1st	Andrew Lichtenberger (1/1)	$568,158
2nd	Craig Blight	$351,721
3rd	Chris Johnson	$249,336
4th	Mac Sohrabi	$179,015
5th	Linglin Zeng	$130,191
6th	Erhan Iscan	$95,925
7th	Thomas Miller	$71,617
8th	Roger Teska	$54,190
9th	Daniel Wagner	$41,563

=== Event #53: $1,500 Mixed Pot Limit Omaha 8 or Better/Big O ===
- 4-Day Event: June 30-July 3
- Number of Entries: 668
- Total Prize Pool: $901,800
- Number of Payouts: 101
- Winning Hand: A♣ 3♣ 2♣ 2♦

Final Table
Place	Name	Prize
1st	Allan Le (1/1)	$189,223
2nd	Philipp Eirisch	$116,915
3rd	Cody Crouch	$79,403
4th	Gavin Smith (0/1)	$54,889
5th	Keith Ferrera	$38,634
6th	Yuval Bronshtein	$27,696
7th	David Bach (0/1)	$20,229
8th	Gary Bolden	$15,059

=== Event #54: $888 Crazy Eights Eight-Handed No Limit Hold'em ===
- 4-Day Event: July 1–4
- Number of Entries: 6,761
- Total Prize Pool: $5,403,391
- Number of Payouts: 956
- Winning Hand: 2♣ 2♠

Final Table
Place	Name	Prize
1st	Hung Le (1/1)	$888,888
2nd	Michael Lech	$401,888
3rd	Dimitar Danchev	$297,888
4th	Rafael Yaraliyev	$222,888
5th	Henry Grunzweig	$167,888
6th	Loni Harwood (0/2)	$126,888
7th	Aurelien Guiglini	$96,888
8th	Yang Zhang	$74,888

=== Event #55: $50,000 Poker Players Championship ===
- 5-Day Event: July 2–6
- Number of Entries: 91
- Total Prize Pool: $4,176,000
- Number of Payouts: 14
- Winning Hand: A♦ 10♠ (No Limit Hold'em)

Final Table
Place	Name	Prize
1st	Brian Rast (1/3)	$1,296,097
2nd	Justin Bonomo (0/1)	$801,048
3rd	Eric Wasserson	$545,772
4th	Michael Mizrachi (0/3)	$380,942
5th	Lamar Wilkinson	$272,558
6th	Ray Dehkharghani (1/1)	$200,027

=== Event #56: $1,500 No Limit Hold'em ===
- 3-Day Event: July 3–5
- Number of Entries: 1,860
- Total Prize Pool: $2,511,000
- Number of Payouts: 279
- Winning Hand: 10♥ 10♣

Final Table
Place	Name	Prize
1st	David Peters (1/1)	$412,557
2nd	Cathal Shine	$254,890
3rd	Matt Affleck	$184,456
4th	Muhammad Abdel Rahim	$134,845
5th	Zachary Okin	$99,592
6th	Brendan Sheehan	$74,321
7th	Takuya Suzuki	$56,044
8th	Kilian Kramer	$42,711
9th	David Patterson	$32,900

=== Event #57: $1,500 Pot Limit Omaha Hi-Lo Split-8 or Better ===
- 3-Day Event: July 3–5
- Number of Entries: 732
- Total Prize Pool: $988,100
- Number of Payouts: 110
- Winning Hand: A♥ 5♥ 6♣ 2♠

Final Table
Place	Name	Prize
1st	David Nowakowski (1/1)	$203,113
2nd	Timothy Vukson	$125,507
3rd	Marco Johnson (1/2)	$87,192
4th	James Alexander	$61,519
5th	Kenneth Po	$44,094
6th	Colin Gelker	$32,114
7th	Stephen Johnson	$23,772
8th	Martin Staszko	$17,890
9th	Matt Lefkowitz	$13,691

=== Event #58: $1,000 No Limit Hold'em ===
- 2-Day Event: July 4–5
- Number of Entries: 1,397
- Total Prize Pool: $1,257,300
- Number of Payouts: 210
- Winning Hand: Q♥ J♦

Final Table
Place	Name	Prize
1st	Corey Thompson (1/1)	$221,163
2nd	Enrico Rudelitz	$136,651
3rd	William Liang	$97,811
4th	Darren Terazawa	$70,821
5th	Ankit Ahuja	$51,878
6th	Terry Fan	$38,452
7th	Matthew Chang	$28,842
8th	Ryan Pochedly	$21,897
9th	Benjamin Reinhart	$16,827

=== Event #59: $5,000 No Limit Hold'em ===
- 4-Day Event: July 5–8
- Number of Entries: 863
- Total Prize Pool: $4,056,100
- Number of Payouts: 130
- Winning Hand: A♠ 7♦

Final Table
Place	Name	Prize
1st	Yue Du (1/1)	$800,586
2nd	Michael Gentili	$494,797
3rd	Natasha Barbour	$348,374
4th	Dominik Nitsche (0/3)	$248,640
5th	Ismael Bojang	$179,923
6th	Marius Gierse	$132,030
7th	Matt O'Donnell (0/1)	$98,269
8th	Sertac Turker	$74,201
9th	Arne Coulier	$56,851

=== Event #60: $1,500 Seven Card Stud Hi-Lo 8 or Better ===
- 3-Day Event: July 5–7
- Number of Entries: 521
- Total Prize Pool: $703,350
- Number of Payouts: 79
- Winning Hand: A♦ 5♠ 7♠ J♦ 3♦ A♣ 5♣

Final Table
Place	Name	Prize
1st	David Prociak (1/1)	$156,546
2nd	Brandon Shack-Harris (1/2)	$96,750
3rd	John Monnette (0/2)	$66,601
4th	Alex Livingston	$46,652
5th	Louis Russo	$33,263
6th	Gaurav Kalro	$24,148
7th	Jameson Painter	$17,855
8th	Calvin Anderson (0/1)	$13,452

=== Event #61: $1,000 Tag Team No Limit Hold'em ===
- 3-Day Event: July 6–8
- Number of Entries: 863
- Total Prize Pool: $776,700
- Number of Payouts: 130
- Winning Hand: K♠ 3♠

Final Table
Place	Name	Prize
1st	Ryan Fee (1/1); Doug Polk (1/2)	$153,358
2nd	Adam Greenberg; Niel Mittelman; Gabriel Paul	$94,748
3rd	Mohsin Charania; Marvin Rettenmaier	$66,458
4th	James Dempsey (0/1); Chris Godfrey	$47,278
5th	John Gale (0/2); T.J. Shulman	$34,118
6th	Owais Ahmed (0/1); Benny Glaser (2/3); Bart Lybaert; Adam Owen	$24,982
7th	Robert Altman; Reuben Peters	$18,564
8th	Marco Caruso; Michael Padula; Daniel Urban	$14,003
9th	Jonathan Little; Larry Little; Rita Little	$10,724

=== Event #62: $25,000 High Roller Pot Limit Omaha ===
- 4-Day Event: July 6–9
- Number of Entries: 184
- Total Prize Pool: $4,370,000
- Number of Payouts: 28
- Winning Hand: Q♠ 10♠ 5♦ 3♦

Final Table
Place	Name	Prize
1st	Jens Kyllönen (1/1)	$1,127,035
2nd	Tommy Le	$696,558
3rd	Dan Smith	$487,361
4th	Ryan D'Angelo (1/1)	$347,641
5th	Veselin Karakitukov	$252,909
6th	Dmitry Savelyev	$187,724
7th	Ludovic Geilich	$142,227
8th	Sean Winter	$110,035

=== Event #63: $1,000 No Limit Hold'em ===
- 3-Day Event: July 7–9
- Number of Entries: 2,452
- Total Prize Pool: $2,206,800
- Number of Payouts: 368
- Winning Hand: Q♠ 8♦

Final Table
Place	Name	Prize
1st	Tony Dunst (1/1)	$339,254
2nd	Jason Rivkin	$209,596
3rd	Joshua Field	$153,015
4th	Francisco Araujo	$112,724
5th	Matas Cimbolas	$83,804
6th	Sergio Cabrera	$62,880
7th	Levon Torosyan	$47,622
8th	Raffaele Castro	$36,406
9th	David Sciacqua	$28,097

=== Event #64: $3,000 Pot Limit Omaha Hi-Lo Split 8 or Better ===
- 3-Day Event: July 7–9
- Number of Entries: 473
- Total Prize Pool: $1,291,290
- Number of Payouts: 71
- Winning Hand: K♦ Q♥ J♠ 2♣

Final Table
Place	Name	Prize
1st	Kyle Bowker (1/1)	$294,960
2nd	Kate Hoang	$182,281
3rd	Jarred Graham	$124,360
4th	Richard Ashby (0/1)	$86,422
5th	Chris Ruby	$61,196
6th	Noah Bronstein	$44,171
7th	Daniel Lowe	$32,510
8th	Scott Clements (0/2)	$24,409
9th	Paul Taylor	$18,702

=== Event #65: $10,000/$1,000 Ladies No Limit Hold'em Championship ===
- 3-Day Event: July 8–10
- Number of Entries: 819
- Total Prize Pool: $745,200
- Number of Payouts: 123
- Winning Hand: A♣ K♥

Final Table
Place	Name	Prize
1st	Courtney Kennedy (1/1)	$149,108
2nd	Amanda Baker	$92,121
3rd	Xiu Deng	$64,401
4th	Natalia Breviglieri	$45,683
5th	Amanda Musumeci	$32,889
6th	Shelly Johnson-Ochoa	$24,037
7th	Wendy Freedman	$17,837
8th	Nicole Schwartz	$13,443
9th	Yaxi Zhu	$10,292

=== Event #66: $1,000 WSOP.com Online No Limit Hold'em ===
- 1-Day Event: July 8
- Final Table: July 11
- Number of Entries: 1,247
- Total Prize Pool: $1,184,650
- Number of Payouts: 153
- Winning Hand: A♥ 3♦

Final Table
Place	Name	Prize
1st	Clayton Maguire (1/1)	$210,279
2nd	Simeon Naydenov (0/1)	$150,569
3rd	Marc-Olivier Carpentier-Perrault	$110,172
4th	Spencer Taylor	$82,926
5th	Richard Tuhrim	$59,233
6th	Park Yu Cheung	$46,201

=== Event #67: $111,111 High Roller for One Drop No Limit Hold'em ===
- 3-Day Event: July 8–10
- Number of Entries: 183
- Total Prize Pool: $19,316,565
- Number of Payouts: 28
- Winning Hand: 8♣ 7♣

Final Table
Place	Name	Prize
1st	Fedor Holz (1/1)	$4,981,775
2nd	Dan Smith	$3,078,974
3rd	Koray Aldemir	$2,154,265
4th	Jack Salter	$1,536,666
5th	Brian Green	$1,117,923
6th	Joe McKeehen (0/1)	$829,792
7th	Nick Petrangelo (0/1)	$628,679
8th	Niall Farrell	$486,383

=== Event #68: $10,000 Main Event No Limit Hold'em Championship ===
The finalists for this event, known as the November Nine, competed in the fall to determine the champion; The event location was the Penn & Teller Theater.

- 10-Day Event: July 9–18
- Final Table: October 30-November 1
- Number of Entries: 6,737
- Total Prize Pool: $63,327,800
- Number of Payouts: 1,011
- Winning Hand: K♣ 10♣

Final Table
Place	Name	Prize
1st	Qui Nguyen (1/1)	$8,005,310
2nd	Gordon Vayo	$4,661,228
3rd	Cliff Josephy (0/2)	$3,453,035
4th	Michael Ruane	$2,576,003
5th	Vojtech Ruzicka	$1,935,288
6th	Kenny Hallaert	$1,464,258
7th	Griffin Benger	$1,250,190
8th	Jerry Wong	$1,100,076
9th	Fernando Pons	$1,000,000

=== Event #69: $1,000 + 111 Little One for One Drop No Limit Hold'em ===
- 6-Day Event: July 12–17
- Number of Entries: 4,360
- Total Prize Pool: $3,924,000
- Number of Payouts: 654
- Winning Hand: Q♠ J♠

Final Table
Place	Name	Prize
1st	Michael Tureniec (1/1)	$525,520
2nd	Calvin Anderson (0/1)	$324,597
3rd	Ryan D'Angelo (1/1)	$239,232
4th	Sam Ho	$177,695
5th	Thai Tran	$133,028
6th	Lucas Blanco	$100,380
7th	Samer Al-Shurieki	$76,351
8th	Shai Zurr	$58,543
9th	Guillaume Diaz	$45,254
