= 2026 World Series of Poker =

Series of poker tournaments

- Location: Horseshoe Las Vegas and Paris Las Vegas, Las Vegas, Nevada
- Dates: May 26 – July 15

Champion
- (United States) Lucas Jumalon

The 2026 World Series of Poker (WSOP) was the 57th annual edition of the World Series of Poker, a festival of poker tournaments. It was held from May 26 – July 15, 2026, at Paris Las Vegas and Horseshoe Las Vegas in Las Vegas, Nevada.

There were 100 in-person bracelet events, plus 30 online bracelet events.

Television and streaming coverage of the Main Event returned to ESPN as part of a multi-year rights deal with at least 6 hours per day of live coverage on the ESPN app. As part of the new television agreement, the final table of the Main Event was delayed until August in order to allow ESPN to air edited coverage and build interest. The final table was shown live in its entirety on the ESPN app and online, with portions airing on ESPN2. Other bracelet events were streamed for free on the WSOP's YouTube page.

New events included $550 Mini Mystery Millions, $10,000 GGMillion$, $1,500 Pick your PLO, $500 Summer Saver, $1,500 PLO 5 Card and $1,700 Circuit Championship.

== Schedule ==
Key: (bracelets won in 2026/bracelets won in career)

High stakes event ($10,000+ buy-in).
No points awarded towards Player of the Year.
Online event.
Online event, with in-person final table.

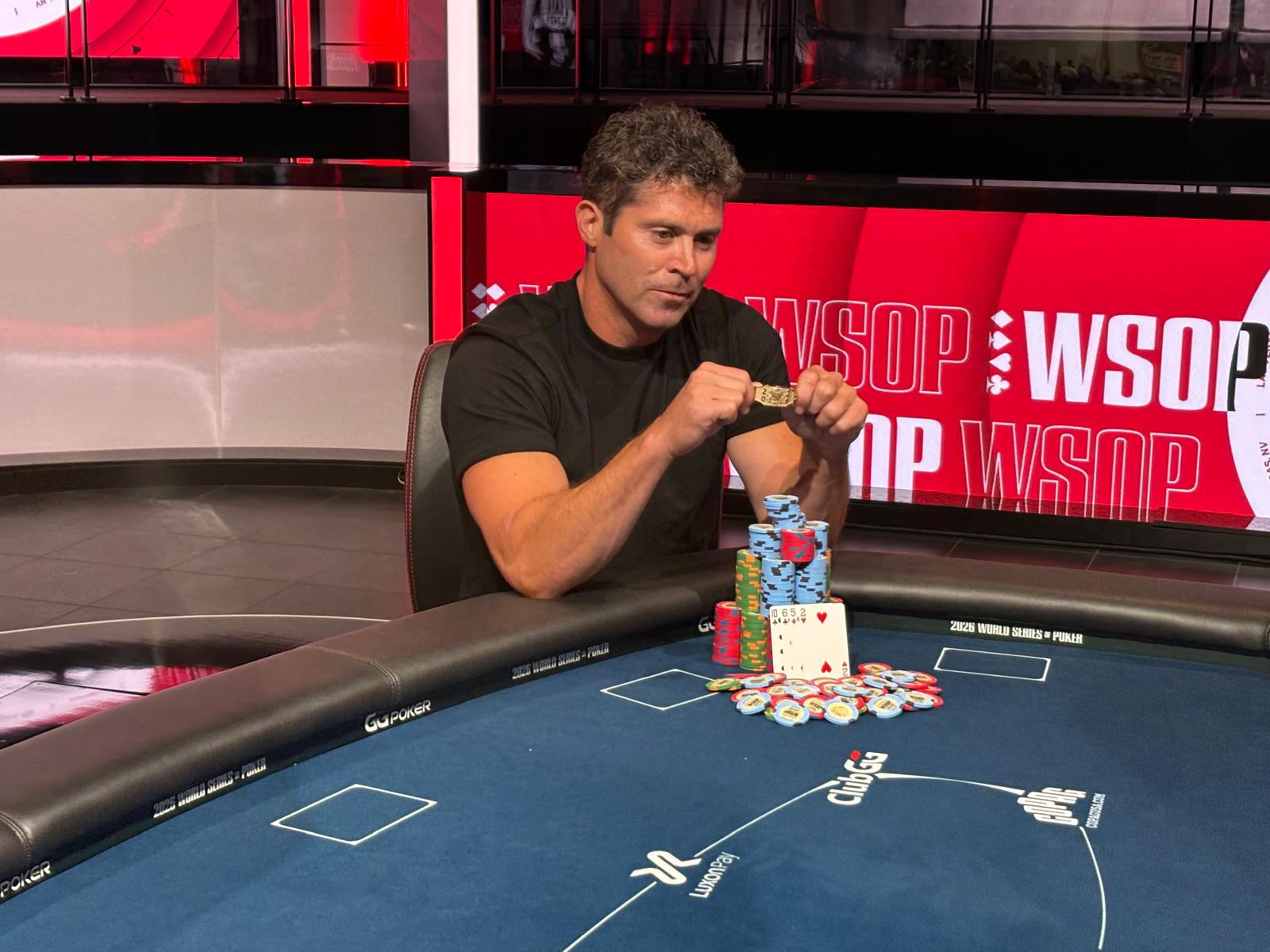
Scott Clements after winning Event #9 at the 2026 WSOP

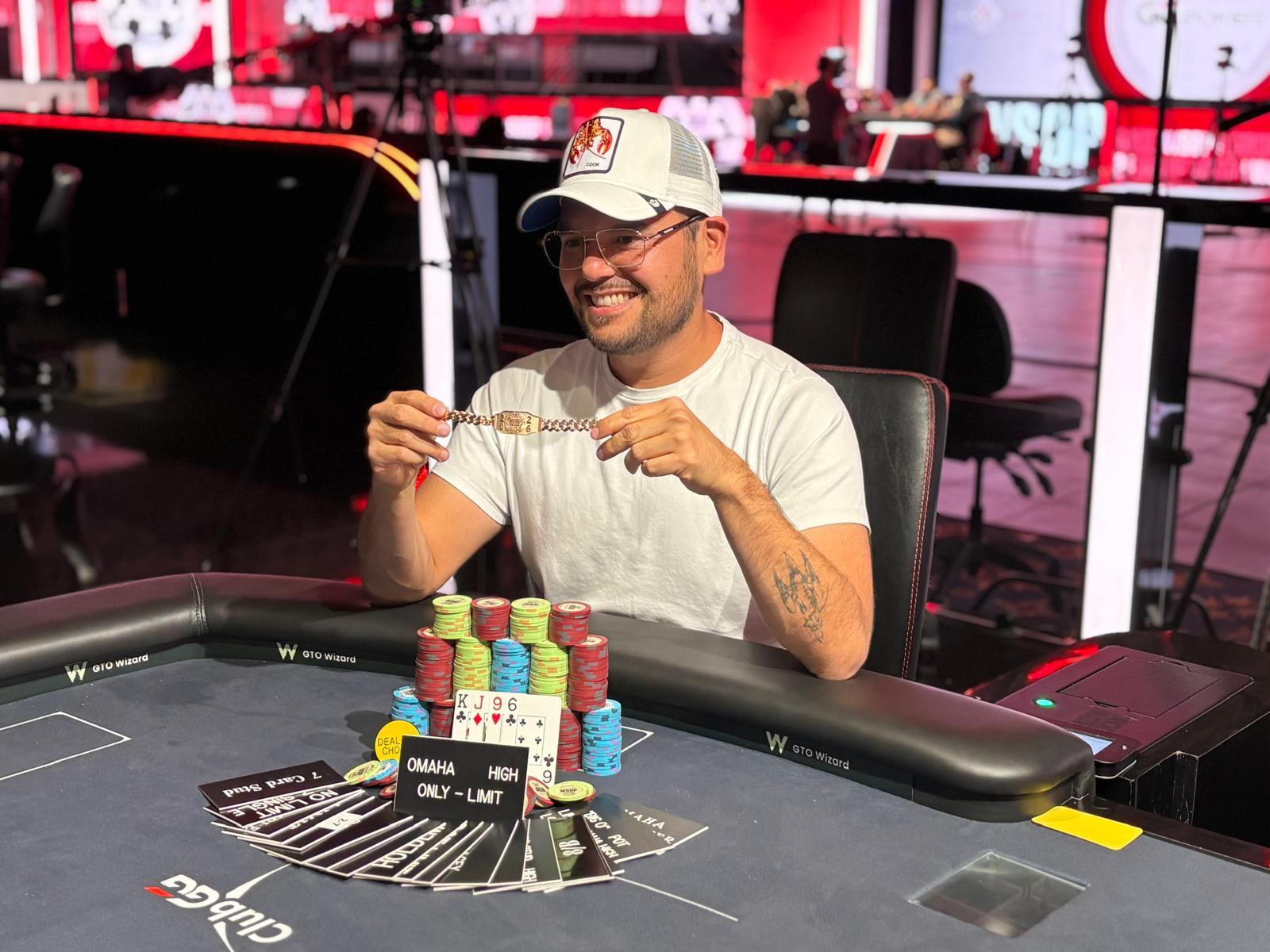
Bryce Yockey after winning Event #27 at the 2026 WSOP

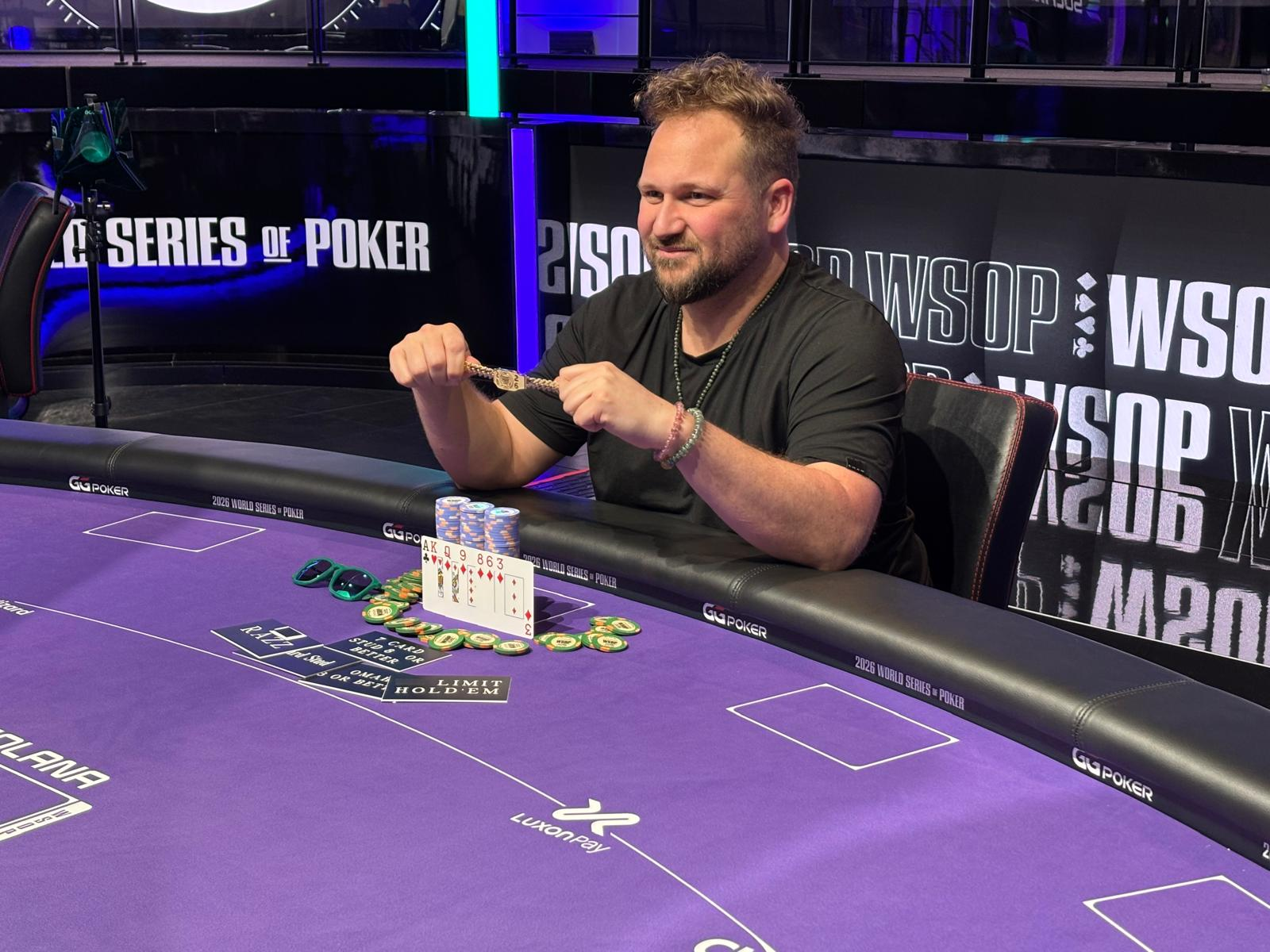
Calvin Anderson after winning Event #54 at the 2026 WSOP

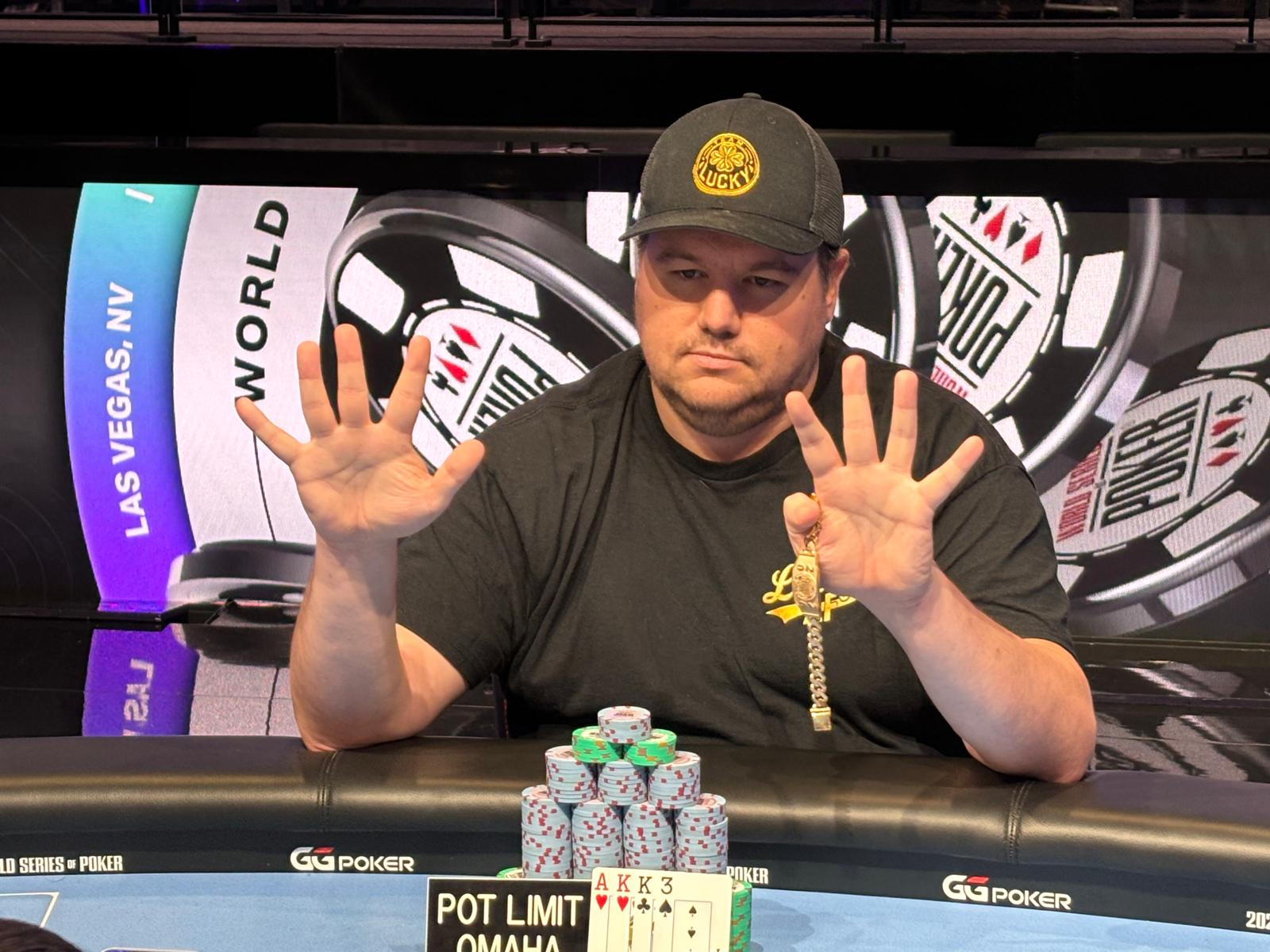
Shaun Deeb after winning Event #74 at the 2026 WSOP

#	Event	Entrants	Winner	Prize	Runner-up	Results
1	$550 No-Limit Hold'em Mini Mystery Millions	20,488	(United States) Philip Chun (1/1)	$400,000	(Palestine) Jalil Houssain	Results
2	$5,000 No-Limit Hold'em 8-Handed	570	(United States) Daniyal Gheba (1/1)	$502,985	(China) Chenxiang Miao	Results
3	$500 Industry Employees No-Limit Hold'em	906	(United States) Jerome Neppl (1/1)	$64,083	(United States) Sean Hamrick	Results
4	$1,500 Omaha Hi-Lo 8 or Better	828	(United States) Jason Daly (1/3)	$191,362	(Venezuela) Dorian Rios	Results
5	$5,000 Pot-Limit Omaha	716	(China) Yang Wang (1/1)	$595,388	(United States) Jesse Lonis (0/2)	Results
6	$1,500 Seven Card Stud	359	(United Kingdom) James Cheung (1/1)	$103,185	(United States) Brian Yoon (0/5)	Results
7	$25,000 No-Limit Hold'em Heads Up Championship	128	(Bulgaria) Dimitar Danchev (1/2)	$800,000	(Russia) Nikita Kuznetsov	Results
8	$1,500 Badugi	554	(United States) Michael Casella (1/1)	$141,963	(United States) Nick Schulman (0/7)	Results
9	$10,000 Omaha Hi-Lo 8 or Better Championship	204	(United States) Scott Clements (1/4)	$450,176	(United States) Dylan Weisman (0/2)	Results
o1	$400 No Limit Hold'em Kick Off		(United States) Sasha Mahabir (1/1)	$102,564		
10	$600 No-Limit Hold'em Deepstack	4,622	(United States) Karapet Galstyan (1/1)	$259,829	(United States) Joshua Lusby-Angvick	Results
11	$10,000 GGMillion$ No-Limit Hold'em High Roller	627	(United States) Naseem Salem (1/1)	$1,089,964	(United States) Alex Cruz	Results
12	$1,500 No-Limit 2-7 Lowball Draw	626	(United States) Stephen Hubbard (1/1)	$155,819	(United States) Gabriel Paul	Results
o2	$555 No-Limit Hold'em Mystery Bounty		(United States) Thomas Esch (1/1)	$73,683		
o3	$888 No-Limit Hold'em Crazy 8s		(United States) Michael Sydnes (1/1)	$119,380		
13	$1,500 No-Limit Hold'em 6-Handed	1,840	(United States) Honghao Zhang (1/1)	$346,108	(United States) Harlan Karnofsky	Results
14	$1,500 Mixed: PLO Hi-Lo 8 or Better, Omaha Hi-Lo 8 or Better, Big O	1,287	(United States) Justin Liberto (1/2)	$265,297	(United States) Chris Lee	Results
15	$600 Pot-Limit Omaha Deepstack	2,636	(United States) Philip Ardire (1/1)	$171,589	(United States) Randy Jacks	Results
16	$1,700 No-Limit Hold'em U.S. WSOP Circuit Championship	2,148	(United States) Antonio Vargas (1/1)	$439,605	(United States) Kai Cohen	Results
17	$10,000 No-Limit 2-7 Lowball Draw Championship	198	(Japan) Naoya Kihara (1/2)	$428,923	(United States) David Lin	Results
o4	$1,000 No-Limit Hold'em Summer Warm-Up		(Bulgaria) Simeon Spasov (1/3)	$104,177		
18	$1,500 No-Limit Hold'em Monster Stack	11,933	(United States) Richard Alsup (1/2)	$1,302,125	(United States) Salvatore Dicarlo (0/1)	Results
19	$25,000 No-Limit Hold'em High Roller	345	(Canada) Kristen Foxen (1/6)	$1,773,083	(United States) Galen Hall (0/1)	Results
20	$1,500 Dealers Choice	656	(United States) Jeff Madsen (1/5)	$161,057	(United States) Philip Wess	Results
21	$1,500 Pot-Limit Omaha Hi-Lo 8 or Better	1,093	(Canada) Frederic Normand (1/1)	$235,377	(Portugal) Michael Rodrigues (0/1)	Results
22	$1,500 Big O	2,150	(Canada) Christopher Alcindor (1/1)	$387,110	(United States) James Roullier	Results
23	$10,000 Seven Card Stud Championship	130	(Japan) Naoya Kihara (2/3)	$301,970	(United Kingdom) James Cheung (1/1)	Results
24	$25,000 No-Limit Hold'em High Roller 6-Handed	242	(Russia) Artur Martirosian (1/4)	$1,286,285	(Moldova) Pavel Plesuv (0/1)	Results
o5	$500 No-Limit Hold'em PKO 6-Max		(United States) Edward Leonard (1/1)	$65,892		
25	$500 No-Limit Hold'em Freezeout	4,100	(United States) Brayden Lou (1/1)	$190,066	(United States) Jason Hoffman	Results
26	$2,000 No-Limit Hold'em	968	(United States) Braxton Dunaway (1/2)	$288,064	(France) Erwann Pecheux	Results
27	$10,000 Dealers Choice Championship	163	(United States) Bryce Yockey (1/3)	$371,664	(United States) Ryan Miller (0/2)	Results
o6	$600 No-Limit Hold'em Deepstack		(United States) Quintin Trammell (1/1)	$135,400		
28	$600 No-Limit Hold'em/Pot-Limit Omaha Mixed Deepstack	3,332	(United States) Brent Gregory (1/1)	$204,140	(United States) Maurice Hawkins	Results
29	$50,000 No-Limit Hold'em High Roller	167	(India) Santhosh Suvarna (1/3)	$1,922,870	(South Korea) Chang Lee (0/1)	Results
30	$1,500 Limit Hold'em	510	(Germany) Dennis Weiss (1/3)	$133,704	(United States) Omar Mehmood	Results
o7	$250 No-Limit Hold'em Mystery Bounty		(United States) Nicholas Funaro (1/1)	$77,541		
31	$1,500 No-Limit Hold'em Super Turbo Bounty	2,103	(United States) Mike Holtz (1/2)	$238,097	(Malaysia) Mei Seow	Results
32	$3,000 No-Limit Hold'em	1,300	(United States) Omar Zazay (1/1)	$538,158	(United States) Jean-Robert Bellande (0/1)	Results
33	$10,000 Pot-Limit Omaha Hi-Lo 8 or Better Championship	390	(United States) Nathan Gamble (1/3)	$767,395	(United States) Justin Liberto (1/2)	Results
o8	$1,000 No-Limit Hold'em Turbo		(Australia) Joshua McCully (1/1)	$113,097		
34	$500 No-Limit Hold'em Colossus	16,269	(United States) Justin Smith (1/1)	$550,000	(United States) Myles German	Results
35	$1,500 Pot-Limit Omaha	2,581	(United States) Jason Zipfel (1/1)	$441,560	(Hong Kong) Hokyiu Lee (0/1)	Results
36	$100,000 No-Limit Hold'em High Roller	115	(Brazil) Yuri Dzivielevski (1/6)	$2,841,432	(Netherlands) Teun Mulder	Results
37	$1,500 HORSE	780	(United States) Nick Schulman (1/8)	$183,366	(Canada) Clayton Mozdzen	Results
38	$10,000 Limit Hold'em Championship	121	(China) Dong Chen (1/2)	$285,200	(United Kingdom) Benny Glaser (0/8)	Results
39	$5,000 No-Limit Hold'em Seniors High Roller	844	(Peru) Juan Rodriguez (1/1)	$673.011	(Iran) Nariman Yaghmai	Results
40	$1,500 Razz	519	(Germany) Sebastian Pauli (1/1)	$135,564	(Germany) Dennis Weiss (1/3)	Results
41	$250,000 No-Limit Hold'em Super High Roller	56	(Spain) Adrián Mateos (1/6)	$4,334,411	(United States) Bryn Kenney (0/2)	Results
42	$10,000 Big O Championship	456	(United States) Daniel Aharoni (1/1)	$861,287	(United States) Aaron Kupin (0/1)	Results
o9	$400 PLOssus PKO 6-Max		(United States) Travis Pearson (1/1)	$62,937		
43	$800 No-Limit Hold'em Deepstack 8-Handed	3,903	(United Kingdom) Matthew Moss (1/1)	$318,556	(United States) Darryl Ronconi	Results
44	$10,000 No-Limit Hold'em Super Turbo Bounty	466	(United States) Alex Foxen (1/4)	$594,246	(China) Yixi Tang	Results
45	$2,500 Mixed Omaha Hi-Lo 8 or Better, Seven Card Stud hi-Lo 8 or Better	587	(United States) Eddie Blumenthal (1/1)	$248,545	(Russia) Nikolai Fal	Results
o10	$1,000 No-Limit Hold'em Deepstack		(United States) John McDonald (1/1)	$142,024		
o11	$600 No-Limit Hold'em Mystery Bounty		(United States) Krista Gifford (1/1)	$94,437		
46	$1,000 No-Limit Hold'em Seniors Championship	7,538	(Canada) Homan Mohammadi (1/1)	$660,000	(United States) Larry Quang	Results
47	$25,000 Pot-Limit Omaha High Roller	451	(Finland) Eelis Parssinen (1/2)	$2,161,056	(United States) Levon Khachatryan	Results
48	$10,000 Razz Championship	155	(United States) Calvin Anderson (1/6)	$357,026	(United States) Eric Rodawig (0/1)	Results
49	$2,500 No-Limit Hold'em Freezeout	1,561	(United States) Marco Johnson (1/3)	$513,885	(United States) Chino Rheem	Results
o12	$3,200 No-Limit Hold'em High Roller		(Taiwan) Tao Chu (1/1)	$199,237		
50	$1,500 No-Limit Hold'em Millionaire Maker	11,769	(United States) Joseph Liberta (1/1)	$1,250,000	(United States) Michael Monroig	Results
51	$10,000 No-Limit Hold'em Mystery Bounty	558	(United States) Alex Anton (1/1)	$678,300	(France) Julien Sitbon (0/1)	Results
52	$3,000 Nine Game Mix	472	(United States) Joey Couden (1/3)	$254,470	(United States) Shaun Deeb (0/8)	Results
53	$1,500 Five Card Pot-Limit Omaha	1,319	(United States) Zachary Gruneberg (1/3)	$271,552	(Hong Kong) Hokyiu Lee (0/1)	Results
54	$10,000 HORSE Championship	189	(United States) Calvin Anderson (2/7)	$413,580	(United States) Josh Arieh (0/7)	Results
55	$50,000 Pot-Limit Omaha High Roller	110	(Brazil) João Simão (1/4)	$1,368,700	(India) Santosh Suvarna (1/3)	Results
56	$3,000 No-Limit Hold'em 6-Handed	1,150	(Canada) Abhishek Mhatre (1/1)	$492,050	(Sweden) Martin Jacobson (0/1)	Results
57	$1,000 Pot-Limit Omaha	3,763	(United States) Harry Rubin (1/1)	$390,300	(Romania) Narcis-Gabriel Nedelcu (0/1)	Results
58	$1,500 Limit 2-7 Lowball Triple Draw	657	(United States) Michelle Chin (1/1)	$161,313	(United States) Daniel Strelitz (0/2)	Results
o13	$500 No-Limit Hold'em Monsterstack		(United States) Guy Dunlap (1/5)	$129,071		
59	$500 No-Limit Hold'em Salute To Warriors	4,478	(United States) Prashanth Nataraj (1/1)	$208,800	(United States) Laurance Essak	Results
60	$50,000 Poker Players Championship	108	(United Kingdom) Benny Glaser (1/9)	$1,343,764	(United States) Josh Arieh (0/7)	Results
o14	$1,000 No-Limit Hold'em 6-Max		(United States) Anthony Runza (1/1)	$160,728		
61	$1,000 No-Limit Hold'em Super Seniors	3,323	(France) Lionel Barracano (1/1)	$355,263	(South Korea) Kevin Song (0/1)	Results
62	$2,500 No-Limit Hold'em	1,736	(United States) Josh Reichard (1/1)	$555,198	(United States) Caleb Harris	Results
63	$1,000 No-Limit Hold'em Mystery Millions	22,811	(United States) Matthew Higgins (1/1)	$1,000,000	(Poland) Dominik Panka (0/1)	Results
64	$25,000 PLO/NLH Mixed High Roller	214	(Finland) Eelis Parssinen (2/3)	$1,172,296	(Finland) Juha Helppi (0/2)	Results
65	$1,500 No-Limit Hold'em Freezeout	2,617	(Mexico) Ciro Gonzalez (1/1)	$449,067	(United States) Kyle Lin	Results
o15	$400 No-Limit Hold'em Ultra Deepstack		(United States) Brian Frasca (1/1)	$89,964		
66	$1,000 No-Limit Hold'em Tag Team	1,375	(Brazil) Breno Drumond (1/1) (Brazil) Henrique Lessa (1/1)	$184,769	(Japan) Shotaro Murase (Japan) Ruka Yamauchi	Results
67	$10,000 Limit 2-7 Lowball Triple Draw Championship	176	(Japan) Koji Fujimoto (1/1)	$392,478	(United States) Nick Schulman (0/8)	Results
68	$10,000/$1,000 No-Limit Hold'em Ladies Championship	1,475	(United States) Skye Chen (1/1)	$194,630	(United States) Aubrey Williams	Results
69	$1,500 Seven Card Stud Hi-Lo 8 or Better	647	(United States) Taylor Atchison (1/1)	$159,276	(United States) Daniil Fedunov	Results
70	$10,000 Pot-Limit Omaha Championship	836	(United States) Michael Mizrachi (1/9)	$1,350,203	(India) Zarvan Tumboli	Results
71	$2,500 Mixed Big Bet 7-Handed	386	(United States) Dylan Smith (1/1)	$182,591	(United States) Matt Vengrin (0/1)	Results
o16	$5,300 No-Limit Hold'em High Roller 6-Max Championship		(United States) Ethan Yau (1/2)	$228,825	(Spain) Adrián Mateos (1/6)	
72	$1,000 No-Limit Hold'em Mini Main Event	12,560	(Japan) Daisuke Ogita (1/1)	$1,000,000	(Canada) Jaehwa Son	Results
73	$5,000 No-Limit Hold'em 6-Handed	1,402	(United States) Markus Gonsalves (1/1)	$979,655	(United States) Xiaoyao Ma	Results
74	$1,500 8-Game Mixed	766	(United States) Shaun Deeb (1/9)	$181,625	(United States) Dean Joe	Results
o17	$500 No-Limit Hold'em			$		
o18	$888 No-Limit Hold'em Crazy 8s			$		
75	$10,000 Seven Card Stud Hi-Lo 8 or Better Championship	190	(United States) Matt Grapenthien (1/2)	$415,648	(United Kingdom) Jack Germaine	Results
o19	$400 No-Limit Hold'em Mystery Bounty			$		
76	$100,000 Pot-Limit Omaha High Roller	83	(Canada) Daniel Negreanu (1/8)	$2,257,718	(Russia) Artur Martirosian (1/4)	Results
77	$2,500 Mixed Triple Draw Lowball	508	(Canada) Patrick Stacey (1/1)	$223,177.	(Hong Kong) Danny Tang (0/1)	Results
o20	$3,200 No-Limit Hold'em High Roller		(Czech Republic) Martin Kabrhel (1/6)	$195,195	(United States) Krista Gifford (1/1)	
78	$600 No-Limit Hold'em Deepstack Championship	5,177	(South Africa) Adriaan Jacobs (1/1)	$282,817	(United States) Paul Merlette	Results
79	$3,000 No-Limit Hold'em Freezeout	1,792	(Israel) Asi Moshe (1/5)	$683,830	(China) Qiao Du	Results
80	$10,000 8-Game Mixed Championship	199	(Poland) Dzmitry Urbanovich (1/1)	$431,260	(United States) Richard Bai	Results
81	$800 No-Limit Hold'em Summer Celebration	6,803	(United States) Toby Price (1/1)	$500,000	(Germany) Deniz Oney	Results
82	$10,000 WSOP No-Limit Hold'em Main Event	9,208	(United States) Lucas Jumalon (1/1)	$10,000,000	(Finland) Lauri Sääskilahti	Results
83	$1,500 Pot-Limit Omaha Double Board Bomb Pot	1,673	(United States) Justin Fawcett (1/2)	$322,564	(United States) Abdul Amer	Results
o21	$555 PLO Mystery Bounty 6-Max			$		
84	$5,000 No-Limit Hold'em Super Turbo Bounty	1,213	(United States) Myles Mullaly (1/1)	$593,601	(Taiwan) Pete Chen (0/2)	Results
85	$1,000 No-Limit Hold'em	1,732	(China) Zixuan Liu (1/1)	$219,391	(United States) Justin Shiao	Results
o22	$1,000 No-Limit Hold'em 6-Max Online Championship			$		
86	$600 No-Limit Hold'em Ultra Stack	8,007	(United States) Eric Weber (1/1)	$400,000	(France) Henry Benamram	Results
o23	$1,000 No-Limit Hold'em Mystery Bounty Championship			$		
o24	$500 No-Limit Hold'em Colossus			$		
o25	$1,000 No-Limit Hold'em Online Deepstack Championship			$		
87	$1,000 Pot-Limit Omaha Mystery Bounty	4,764	(United States) Matthew Shepsky (1/1)	$305,000	(Chile) Alex Manzano (0/1)	Results
o26	$800 No-Limit Hold'em Championship			$		
88	$300 No-Limit Hold'em Gladiators of Poker	11,185	(United States) Johnny Oshana (1/1)	$250,000	(United States) Kenneth Baime	Results
89	$3,000 No-Limit Hold'em Mid-Stakes Championship	3,668	(United States) Yanting Jiang (1/1)	$1,159,182	(United States) Chahn Jung	Results
90	$50,000 No-Limit Hold'em High Roller	202	(United Kingdom) Jamie Dwan (1/1)	$2,276,691	(Austria) Daniel Rezaei (0/1)	Results
91	$1,500 Pick Your PLO	857	(Italy) Sergio Benso (1/1)	$196,431	(United States) Farhad Jamasi	Results
92	$3,000 TORSE	457	(United States) Sterling Lopez (1/1)	$247,842	(United States) Jesse Lonis (0/2)	Results
o27	$800 PLO 6-Max Championship			$		
93	$1,500 No-Limit Hold'em The Closer	3,724	(Israel) Ori Hasson (1/2)	$582,800	(South Korea) Kevin Song (0/1)	Results
94	$10,000 No-Limit Hold'em 6-Handed Championship	558	(United States) David Peters (1/5)	$1,001,391	(Bulgaria) Fahredin Mustafov (0/2)	Results
95	$500 No-Limit Hold'em Summer Saver	4,622	(United States) Garrett Dwire (1/1)	$210,000	(Germany) Amadeus Janotta	Results
96	$3,000 Pot-Limit Omaha 6-Handed	892	(China) Joshua Wang (1/1)	$407,137	(United States) Erik Seidel (0/10)	Results
o28	$400 No-Limit Hold'em Mystery Bounty 6-Max			$		
o29	$777 No-Limit Hold'em Lucky 7s			$		
97	$25,000 HORSE High Roller	148	(Russia) Alexander Kostritsyn (1/1)	$872,052	(United States) Ali Eslami (0/1)	Results
98	$800 No-Limit Hold'em Deepstack	2,036	(India) Nishant Sharma (1/1)	$196,659	(Taiwan) Chung-Tang Lin	Results
99	$5,000 No-Limit Hold'em 8-Handed	884	(United States) Darren Rabinowitz (1/2)	$695,256	(United States) Phil Hellmuth (0/17)	Results
o30	$500 No-Limit Hold'em Summer Saver			$		
100	$1,000 No-Limit Hold'em Super Turbo	1,699	(United States) She Wong (1/1)	$216,286	(Japan) Ryuta Nakai	Results

== Daily Deepstacks side events ==
Separate from the bracelet schedule, the 2026 WSOP included a Daily Deepstacks side-event schedule. The Daily deepstack series spanned 166 events from May 16 to July 14, with 93,034 total entries, $20,116,895 in prize pools and 14,070 paid places.

Scope	Events	Dates	Entries	Prize pools	Paid places
Daily Deepstacks	166	May 16-July 14	93,034	$20,116,895	14,070

== Player of the Year ==
Current standings as of June 10

- The total points that any player is able to accumulate is limited to their 10 best events across the series, including a maximum of one online event.
- Includes events from 2026 WSOP Europe series and 2026 WSOP Paradise series.
- Does not include events from the 2026 WSOP Online series.

Standings
Rank	Name	Points	Bracelets
1	(United States) Shaun Deeb	3,410	1
2	(Japan) Naoya Kihara	3,388	2
3	(United States) Alex Foxen	3,381	1
4	(United States) Justin Liberto	2,827	1
5	(United States) Josh Arieh	2,750	0
6	(Canada) Daniel Negreanu	2,698	1
7	(United States) Jesse Lonis	2,674	0
8	(Finland) Eelis Parssinen	2,638	2
9	(United States) Michael Moncek	2,592	0
10	(United States) Joshua Reichard	2,575	1

== The Poker Players Championship ==
The $50,000 Poker Players Championship began on June 21. The 7-handed final table was reached on June 24, and the final 6-handed was played on June 25.

The event attracted 108 entries, generating a prize pool of $5,130,000. The top 17 players finished in the money, with the champion earning $1,343,764.

=== Performance of past champions ===
Name	Championship Year(s)	Day of Elimination
Michael Mizrachi	2010, 2012, 2018, 2025	1
Brian Rast	2011, 2016, 2023	3
Elior Sion	2017	1
Phil Hui	2019	2
Daniel Cates	2021, 2022	1
Daniel Negreanu	2024	2

*- Denotes player who finished in the money

=== Other notable high finishes ===
NB: This list is restricted to in the money finishers with an existing Wikipedia entry.

Place	Name	Prize
9th	Alex Livingston	$144,054
12th	Chris Brewer	$109,459
14th	Phil Hellmuth	$109,459
16th	Matthew Glantz	$102,474

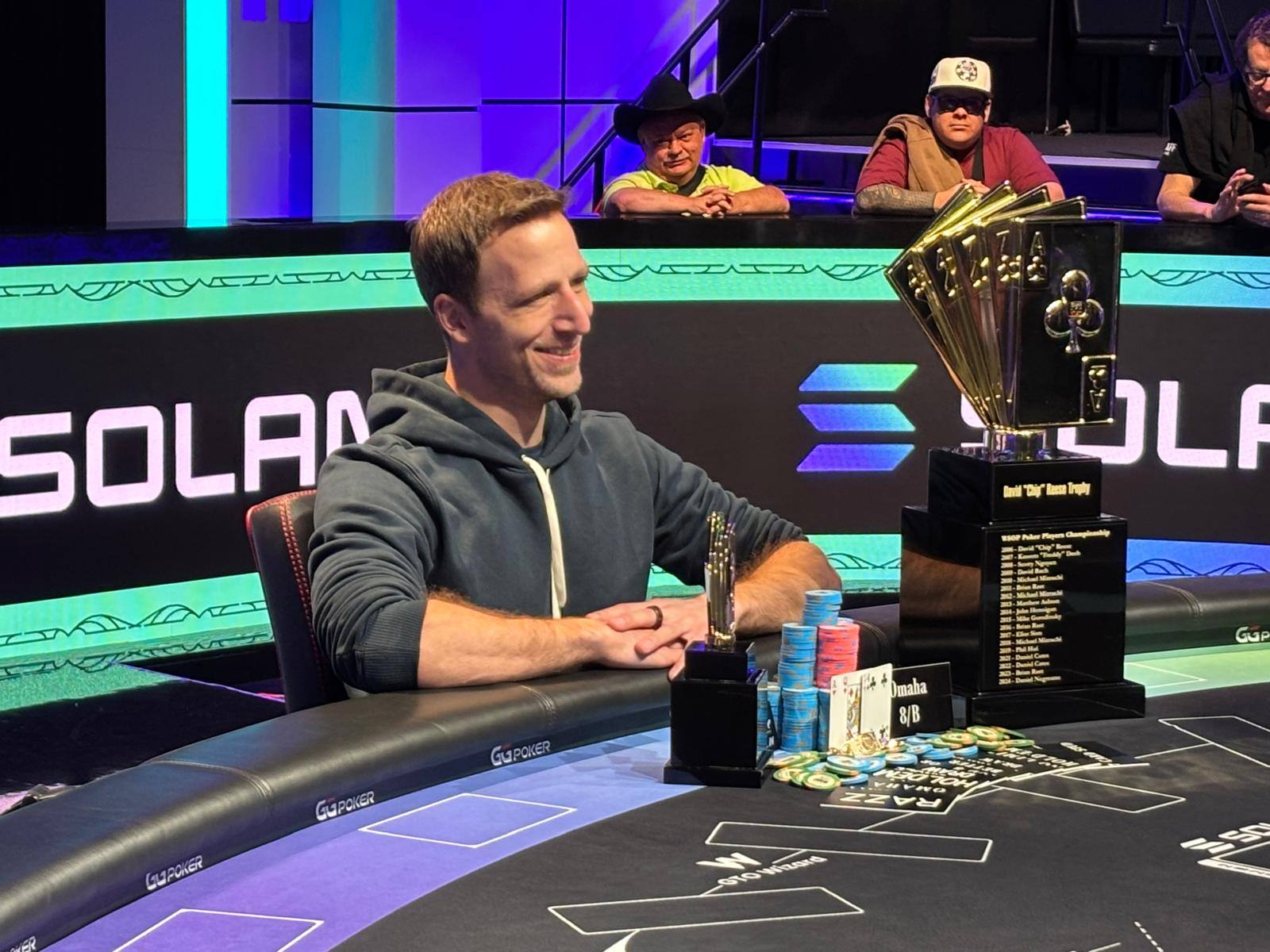
Benny Glaser after winning the PPC at the 2026 WSOP

=== Final Table results ===
Place	Name	Prize
1st	(United Kingdom) Benny Glaser	$1,343,764
2nd	(United States) Josh Arieh	$895,837
3rd	(United States) Phil Ivey	$600,698
4th	(United States) Maxx Coleman	$417,607
5th	(United States) Paul Volpe	$301,405
6th	(United States) Kristopher Tong	$226,172
7th	(United States) Jason Mercier	$176,732

== Main Event ==
The $10,000 No-Limit Hold'em Main Event began on July 2 with the first of four starting flights. The final table was reached on July 13 and was played from August 3–5.

=== Performance of past champions ===
Name	Championship Year(s)	Day of Elimination
Phil Hellmuth	1989	3
Jim Bechtel	1993	2ABC
Huck Seed	1996	3
Scotty Nguyen	1998	1D
Robert Varkonyi	2002	2D
Chris Moneymaker	2003	4 (1382nd)*
Greg Raymer	2004	5 (279th)*
Joe Hachem	2005	4 (803rd)*
Jamie Gold	2006	1C
Joe Cada	2009	2ABC
Greg Merson	2012	3
Ryan Riess	2013	5 (282nd)*
Martin Jacobson	2014	1C
Joe McKeehen	2015	3
Qui Nguyen	2016	1C
Scott Blumstein	2017	4 (666th)*
John Cynn	2018	4 (617th)*
Hossein Ensan	2019	8 (13th)*
Damian Salas	2020	2ABC
Daniel Weinman	2023	2ABC
Jonathan Tamayo	2024	2D
Michael Mizrachi	2025	5 (241st)*

*- Denotes player who finished in the money

=== Other notable high finishes ===
NB: This list is restricted to top 100 finishers with an existing Wikipedia entry.

Place	Name	Prize
13th	Hossein Ensan	$510,000
15th	Shaun Deeb	$410,475
20th	Todd Brunson	$325,000
44th	Ralph Perry	$215,000
66th	Dutch Boyd	$125,000
72nd	Loren Klein	$105,000
99th	Sean Winter	$65,000

=== Final Table ===
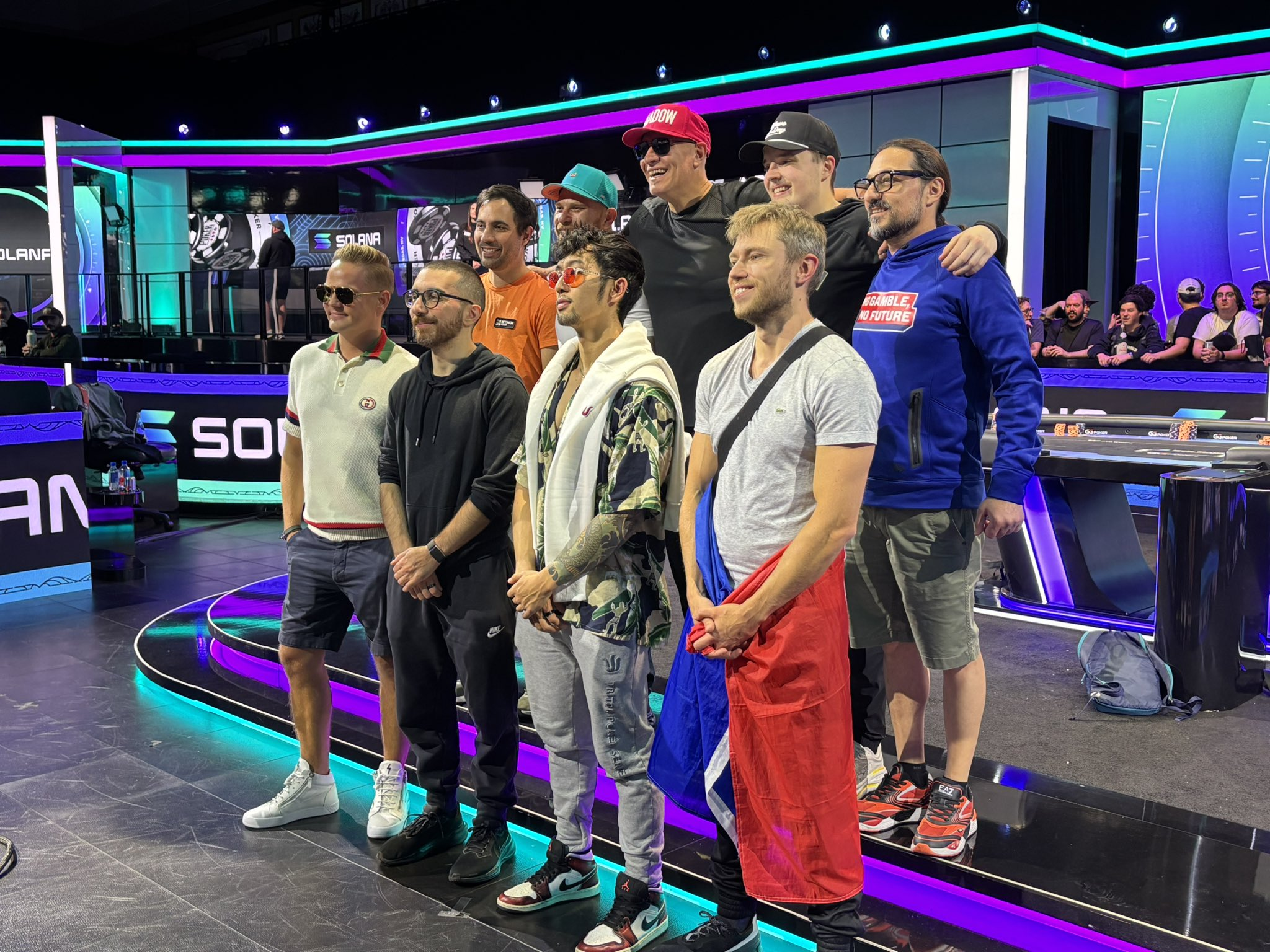
The 2026 World Series of Poker Main Event final table

Name	Number of chips (percentage of total)	WSOP Bracelets	WSOP Cashes*	WSOP Earnings*
(United States) Lucas Jumalon	194,000,000 (35.1%)	0	7	$13,223
(Canada) Rami Hammoud	79,000,000 (14.3%)	0	28	$148,166
(United States) Jamie Shaevel	56,000,000 (10.1%)	0	9	$240,398
(Canada) Greg Mueller	48,500,000 (8.8%)	3	60	$2,993,577
(United States) Michael Gagliano	46,500,000 (8.4%)	3	65	$1,312,718
(France) Mario Boos	44,000,000 (8.0%)	0	6	$16,427
(Finland) Lauri Sääskilahti	37,500,000 (6.8%)	0	0	$0
(United States) Han Feng	25,000,000 (4.5%)	0	27	$175,451
(Cyprus) Evagoras Evagorou	22,500,000 (4.1%)	0	1	$13,848

*- career statistics before the 2026 Main Event

=== Final Table results ===
Place	Name	Prize
1st	(United States) Lucas Jumalon	$10,000,000
2nd	(Finland) Lauri Sääskilahti	$6,000,000
3rd	(Canada) Greg Mueller	$3,750,000
4th	(United States) Michael Gagliano	$2,750,000
5th	(United States) Han Feng	$2,250,000
6th	(Canada) Rami Hammoud	$1,750,000
7th	(United States) Jamie Shaevel	$1,500,000
8th	(France) Mario Boos	$1,250,000
9th	(Cyprus) Evagoras Evagorou	$1,000,000
