= Steve Blay =

American author, inventor, and poker executive (born 1973)

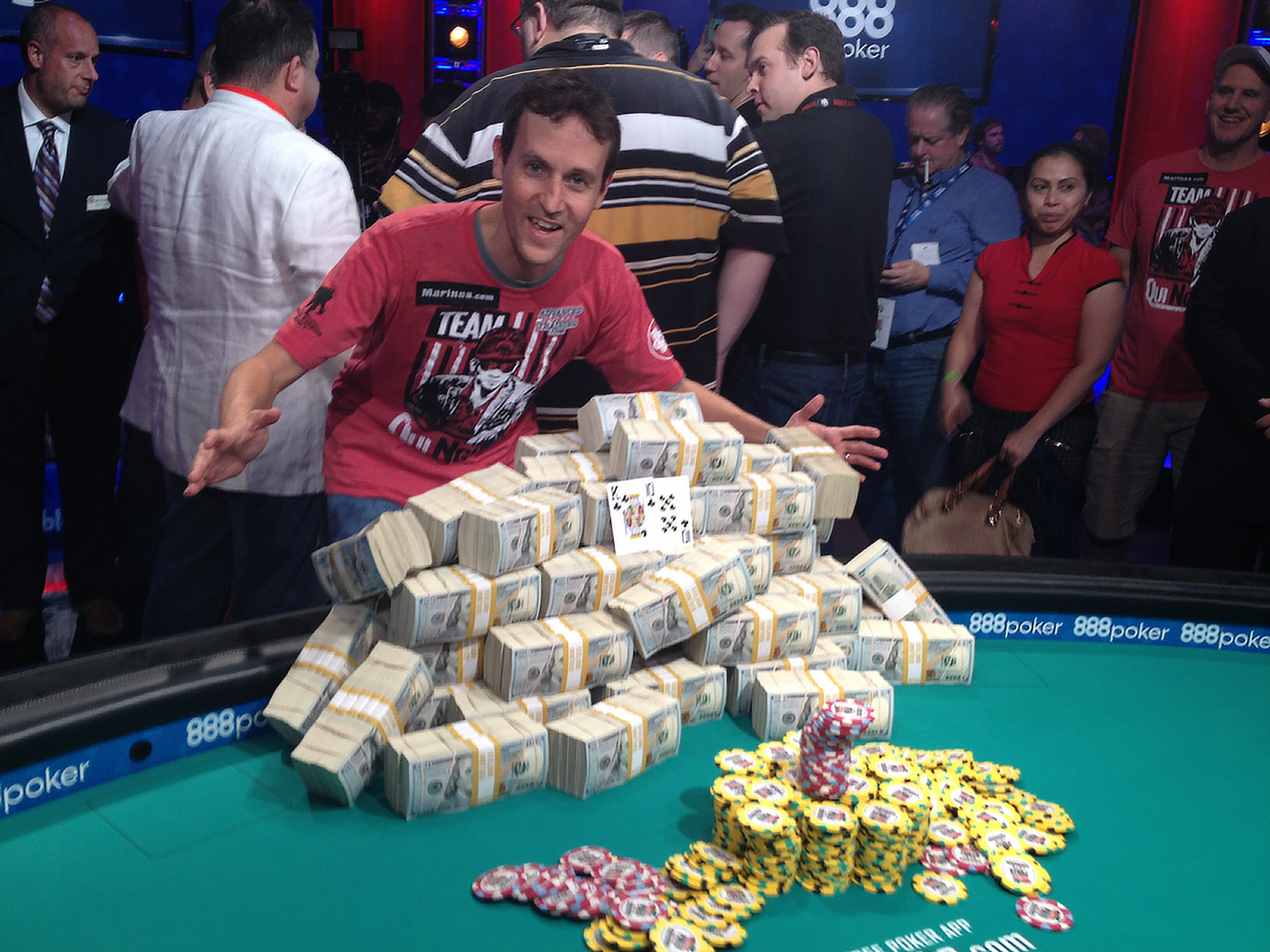
Steve Blay with the Main Event Money

Steve Blay (born January 12, 1973, in Jacksonville, Florida) is a poker author, inventor, and poker executive. He is the founder of AdvancedPokerTraining.com, and holds a patent in the creation of computer poker players and poker training software. He served as poker advisor to 2016 World Series of Poker champion Qui Nguyen.

Blay attended the University of Florida and holds a degree in computer engineering. In 2017, he co-authored From Vietnam to Vegas: How I Won the World Series of Poker Main Event with Qui Nguyen.

== Advanced Poker Training ==
In 2012, Blay was awarded a patent for his technique of “Dynamic Analysis” to improve the play of computerized poker opponents. His website Advanced Poker Training is a reduction to practice of this concept.

Using Blay's software, professional poker players such as Scotty Nguyen, Jonathan Little, David Williams, Ed Miller, and Scott Clements have released training material. In 2014, pioneer poker theorist Mike Caro became the Chief Strategist for Advanced Poker Training.

== 2016 World Series of Poker ==
In 2016, Blay's software was used by PokerNews to run AI simulations of the remaining nine players competing for the World Series of Poker Championship (known as the November Nine). These predicted a victory by Qui Nguyen. When Nguyen heard of these results, he flew Blay out to Las Vegas to help him prepare for the final table. After Nguyen's WSOP victory, D&B publishing reached out to Nguyen and Blay to share their story. The book analyses 170 hands from the final table, with Blay contributing the mathematical analysis.

== Recent Work ==
In 2017, Blay directed the Secrets of the World Champions seminar at the Rio Hotel in Las Vegas. He also produced a series of hand review videos with 2017 World Series of Poker Champion Scott Blumstein. In 2018, Blay took part in a panel discussion at US Special Operations Command (US-SOCOM), regarding the usage of artificial intelligence and machine learning for the benefit of US Elite Special Forces.

In 2019, Blay released OmahaPokerTraining.com, demonstrating pot-limit omaha virtual opponents, also based on his research.

In 2020, Blay appeared in the movie Poker Queens, a movie about gender disparities in poker. He served as advisor to one of the women poker players featured in the film.

In 2026, Blay launched the Champion Maker seminar series at BestBet Jacksonville and was featured in a Toronto Sun article discussing parallels between poker strategy and dating.

Blay is a certified chess coach, poker tournament director, and does personal poker coaching. He also writes monthly articles for Ante Up Magazine and D&B Poker Magazine.

== Bibliography ==
- Blay, Steve; Nguyen, Qui (2017). From Vietnam to Vegas: How I Won the World Series of Poker Main Event with Qui Nguyen. D&B Poker Publishing. ISBN 1-909457-80-9.
