= Alex Keating =

American poker player (born 1987)

- Born: October 12, 1987 (age 39); Brooklyn, Michigan, U.S.

World Series of Poker
- Bracelet: 1
- Money finishes: 3
- Highest WSOP Main Event finish: 35th, 2016

European Poker Tour
- Title: 1
- Final tables: 2
- Money finishes: 3

Alex Keating (Born October 12, 1987 in Brooklyn, Michigan) an American professional poker player from Saratoga, California.

== Online poker ==
Playing under the screen names of "mistakooll" on PokerStars and "kadabra" on Full Tilt Poker, Keating's multitable tournament online winnings exceeded $1,500,000, including a win in the Annual PokerStars 2010 Spring Championship of Online Poker tournament in May for $245,000.

=== Full Tilt Online Poker Series (FTOPS) ===
Under the screen name "Kadabra," Keating won the first event of FTOPS V on August 9, 2007, earning $147,099.

=== The Poker Stars Spring Championship of Online Poker ===
On May 10, 2010. playing under the name "mistakooll", Keating won the Spring Championship of Online Poker event #23 High a $1,000 buy in with $1,000 re-buys tournament for $245,000

=== Sit N Goes ===
Although Keating has blocked his SharkScope stats on Poker Stars Keating is ranked 13th in Holdem Heads Up over $1000 Average Profit Leaderboard, Ranked 14th in Any Game Over $1000 Average Profit Leaderboard and Ranked 16th in Holdem Heads Up Any Stakes Average Profit Leaderboard on Full Tilt Poker.

== Live poker ==
=== The World Series of Poker ===
Keating made his WSOP debut at the 2009 World Series of Poker with three in the money finishes totaling $48,983 and Keating's best finish being a final table taking 5th place in Event 38 for $39,977.

=== World Series of Poker bracelets ===
Year	Tournament	Prize (US$)
2023	$5,000 8-Handed No-Limit Hold'em	$701,688

=== European Poker Tour ===
Keating made his first European Poker Tour in the money appearance at the EPT London in the fall of 2009. Keating has had a total of three in-the-money finishes for a total of $17,214.
