= Benny Glaser =

English poker player (born 1989)

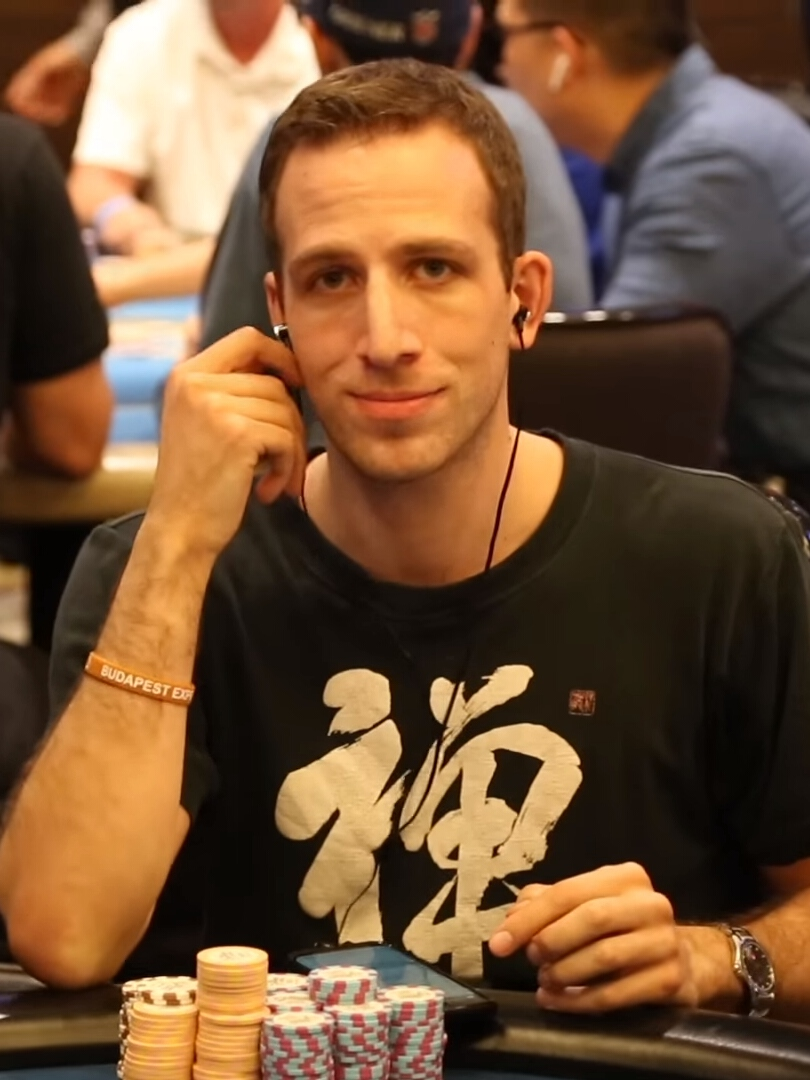
- Glaser in 2018

World Series of Poker
- Bracelets: 9
- Final tables: 32
- Money finishes: 74
- Highest WSOP Main Event finish: 960th, 2022
- Championship of Online Poker (COOP)
- WCOOP titles: 16
- SCOOP titles: 12 (including 3 PKO)

Benny Glaser (/ˈɡlɑːzə/; born 7 June 1989) is a professional poker player from Southampton, UK. He has won nine bracelets at the World Series of Poker (WSOP). He has also won nine European Poker Tour (EPT) events. Overall his total live poker tournament winnings exceed $10,000,000, with a best live cash of $2,830,000 for runner-up in the WPT World Championship at Wynn Las Vegas. His online poker winnings exceed $1,800,000.

== World Series of Poker ==
Glaser has won nine events and made 37 final tables at the WSOP. He won his first bracelet for $136,215 in 2015, playing limit Triple Draw Lowball.

In 2016, Glaser won two bracelets in Omaha High-Low Split in the same week. First, he won the $1,500 event, then four days later won the $10,000 Championship. Glaser joined Jason Mercier and Ian Johns as two-time winners at the 2016 World Series of Poker. In 2021, Glaser won the $10,000 Razz Championship, and in 2023 he added the $10,000 Limit 2-7 Triple Draw Championship. In the 2025 WSOP, he won a $1,500 Dealer's Choice event for his sixth career bracelet. He won his seventh career bracelet in the same World Series in a $1,500 Mixed Omaha event. Glaser then went on to secure his eighth career and third bracelet of the Series in the $2,500 Mixed Triple Draw Lowball, becoming one of only seven players to win three bracelets in a summer. With his third bracelet win in 2025, Glaser became the first player in WSOP history to win three mixed poker bracelets in one WSOP.

In 2026, Glaser won the $50,000 Poker Players Championship, a mixed game event considered one of the most prestigious titles in professional poker. With that win, he became the seventh player in WSOP history—and the first since Erik Seidel in 2021—to claim nine bracelets.

Glaser's nine bracelets are the most by any player from Europe.

=== World Series of Poker bracelets ===
Year	Tournament	Prize (US$)
2015	$1,500 Triple Draw Lowball (Limit)	$136,215
2016	$1,500 Omaha Hi-Low Split-8 or Better	$244,103
2016	$10,000 Omaha Hi-Low Split-8 or Better Championship	$407,194
2021	$10,000 Razz Championship	$274,693
2023	$10,000 Limit 2-7 Triple Draw Championship	$311,428
2025	$1,500 Dealer's Choice	$150,246
2025	$1,500 Mixed Omaha	$258,193
2025	$2,500 Mixed Triple Draw Lowball	$208,552
2026	$50,000 Poker Players Championship	$1,343,764

== World Championship of Online Poker ==
Glaser's poker success isn't just limited to live poker. He's also won several titles in some of the most prestigious online tournaments series in the world. In the World Championship of Online Poker (WCOOP), Glaser has sixteen titles. His first WCOOP title came in 2018 when he won WCOOP-27-L: $55 PLO [6-Max], $100K Gtd for $23,807. On PokerStars, Glaser plays under the alias "RunGodlike." Through 2021, Glaser's largest WCOOP win came in WCOOP-55-H: $2,100 HORSE, $150K Gtd at the 2020 WCOOP when he won $43,055. In 2022 he added a further four titles to his haul. In 2023 Glaser won 7 WCOOP titles, a record for the most titles won in a single series.

=== World Championship of Online Poker titles ===
Year	Tournament	Prize (US$)
2018	WCOOP-27-L: $55 PLO [6-Max], $100K Gtd	$23,807
2019	WCOOP-23-M: $109 Razz, $40K Gtd	$10,924
2020	WCOOP-55-H: $2,100 HORSE, $150K Gtd	$43,055
2021	WCOOP 50-M: $55 NLO8 [6-Max], $50K Gtd	$9,293
2022	WCOOP 09-H: $2,100 HORSE, $75K Gtd	$33,300
2022	WCOOP 18-H: $1,050 PLO [6-Max], $200K Gtd	$39,638
2022	WCOOP 4-L: $11 NLO8 [6-Max], $15K Gtd	$2,334
2022	WCOOP 14-H: $1,050 HORSE, $50K Gtd	$19,107
2023	WCOOP 16-M: $109 Badugi 6-Max, $15K Gtd	$3,550
2023	WCOOP $1,050 World Championship of 2-7 Triple Draw, $50K Gtd	$22,650
2023	WCOOP 50-H: $1,050 NL 2-7 Single Draw, $40K Gtd	$19,490
2023	WCOOP 53-H: $2,100 PLO8 6-Max, $125K Gtd	$44,201
2023	WCOOP 61-H: $1,050 NL 5-Card Draw, $30K Gtd	$14,207
2023	WCOOP 68-M: $320 NLHE 6-Max, $250K Gtd	$55,706
2023	WCOOP 94-H: $1,050 NLHE 6-Max Turbo, $185K Gtd	$38,894
2025	WCOOP 81-M: $55 NLHE 6-Max PKO Turbo	$14,516

== Spring Championship of Online Poker ==
In addition to his WCOOP titles, Glaser has twelve Spring Championship of Online Poker (SCOOP) titles. His first SCOOP title was won in 2016 when he won SCOOP-33-H: $2,100 Stud Hi/Lo, $75K Guaranteed for $54,390. Glaser also won SCOOP titles every year between 2018 and 2023. In 2019 Glaser was the winner of two SCOOP titles, and in 2023 he won three.

=== Spring Championship of Online Poker titles ===
Year	Tournament	Prize (US$)
2016	SCOOP-33-H: $2,100 Stud Hi/Lo, $75K Guaranteed	$54,390
2018	SCOOP-17-L: $22 FLHE, $25K Gtd	$6,202
2019	SCOOP 13-M: $215 FL Triple Draw 2-7, $75K Gtd	$14,667
2019	SCOOP 41-H: $1,050 8-Game, $150K Gtd	$45,840
2020	SCOOP 06-H: $2,100 8-Game, $150K Gtd	$54,854
2021	SCOOP 73-M: $215 PLO [6-Max, Progressive KO], $115K Gtd	$14,819
2022	SCOOP 09-H: $2,100 HORSE [8-Max], $75K Gtd	$31,080
2023	SCOOP 22 H: $1,050 NLO8 [6-Max, Progressive KO], $125K Gtd	$12,711
2023	SCOOP 87 M: $215 PLO8 [6-Max], $65K Gtd	$12,573
2023	SCOOP 100 M: $109 NLHE [7-Max, Progressive KO], $225K Gtd	$33,560
2024	SCOOP 75 L: $55 NLHE [Turbo]	$19,591
2026	SCOOP 12 H: $320 Fenomeno HR [Turbo]	$16,626
