= Michael Gathy =

Belgian poker player

World Series of Poker
- Bracelets: 4
- Final tables: 9
- Money finishes: 32
- Highest WSOP Main Event finish: 107th, 2016

Michael Gathy is a professional poker player from Belgium with many successes in live and online poker, including World Series of Poker bracelets at the 2012, 2013, 2016 and the 2020 World Series of Poker. He is one of two players that have won 4 NLHE bracelets in the decade 2011–2020, alongside Dominik Nitsche. He was also the first person to win a WSOP turbo event. Online he has won multiple SCOOP events and WCOOP events on PokerStars.

== Background ==
Gathy had been a medical student prior to becoming a professional poker player. He learned to play poker online from a website that gave him $50 to begin with and started reading poker articles while learning to play. He eventually quit medical school when he started making a lot of money in mixed cash games online, so he could fully focus on his poker career.

== Career highlights ==
In 2011, Gathy won the €175,000 first place prize in the PokerStars Belgian Poker Series €1,500 + €200 buy-in Grand Final in Namur.

The year after, Gathy defeated a final table that included former bracelet winners John Esposito and Eric Baldwin to win Event 21 $1,000 NLHE at the WSOP. With 2,799 entrants, it was one of the largest events of the 2012 World Series. This victory made Gathy the second ever Belgian bracelet-winner (following Davidi Kitai). It was just the second WSOP event he had ever competed in.

When Gathy won the 1,629-entrant Event 34 $1,000 Turbo NLHE against a final table that included Jake Cody and Jason Duval, it marked the first WSOP bracelet ever awarded for a turbo event. That day he was wearing the same green T-shirt he won his first bracelet with. Gathy joined Kitai, who won the $5,000 Pot Limit Hold'em 2013 World Series of Poker Event 19, as the only Belgian multiple bracelet winners. In 2016, he completed his WSOP hattrick by winning the 541-entrant $5,000 NLHE 6-max Event 35 for $560,843. His fellow countryman (and high stakes regular) Thomas Boivin bubbled the final table, he busted in 7th place. Gathy's 4th bracelet win came in the last event of the 2020 WSOP, which was held online because of COVID-19. He also has two second-place finishes at the WSOP, both in 2016.

== World Series of Poker ==
World Series of Poker results
Year	Cashes	Final Tables	Bracelets
2012	2	2	1
2013	6	1	1
2014	2		
2015	2		
2016	5	3	1
2017	3	1	
2018	6	1	
2019	5		
2020 O	1	1	1

World Series of Poker bracelets
Year	Tournament	Entries	Prize (US$)
2012	$1,000 No Limit Hold'em	2,799	$440,829
2013	$1,000 Turbo No Limit Hold'em	1,629	$278,613
2016	$5,000 Six-Handed No Limit Hold'em	541	$560,843
2020 O	$500 The Closer No Limit Hold'em	4,012	$272,504

An "O" following a year denotes bracelet(s) won during the World Series of Poker Online
