= Lucas Jumalon =

American poker player (born 2004)

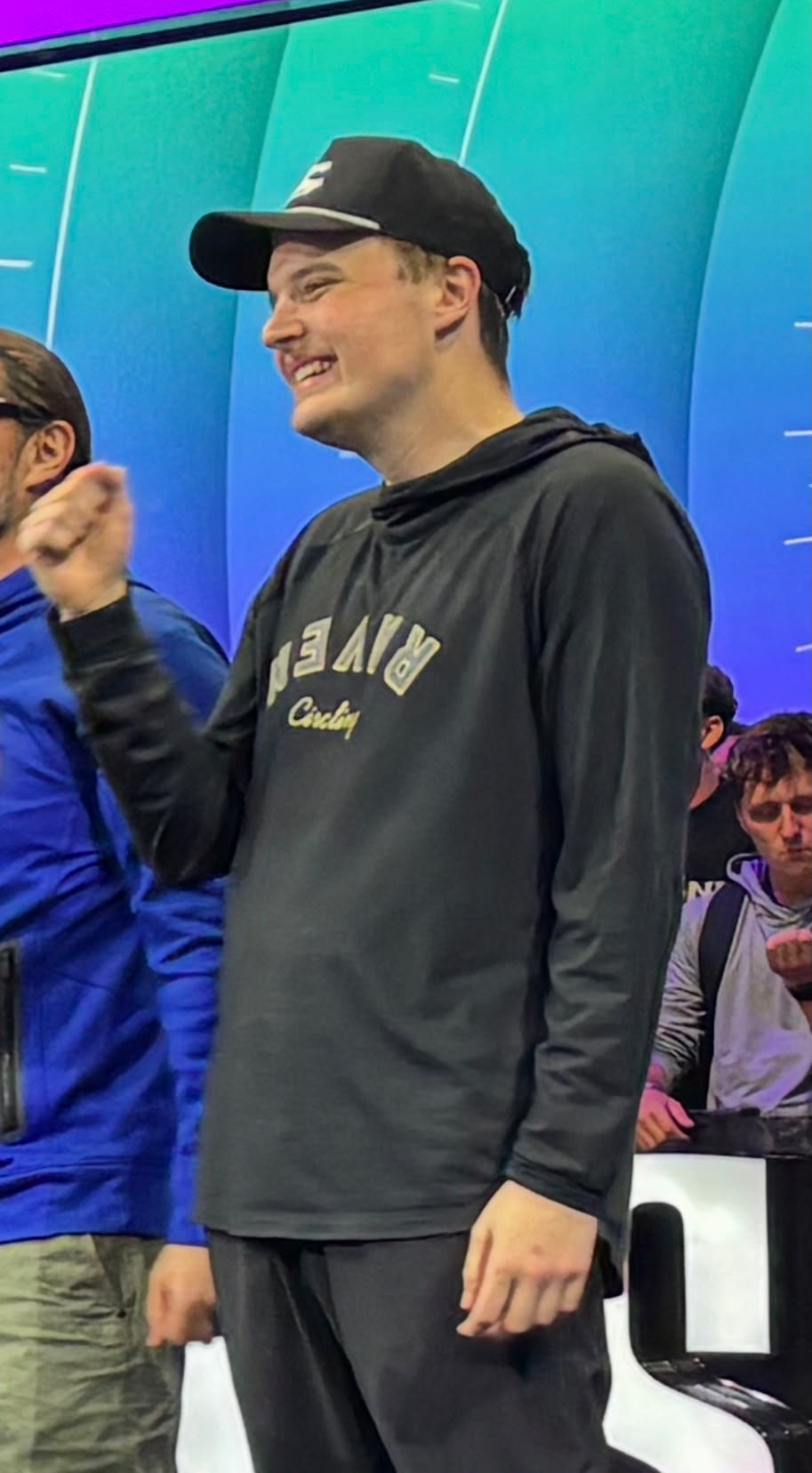
- Jumalon at the 2026 WSOP Main Event
- Born: March 9, 2004 (age 22); Spokane, Washington

World Series of Poker
- Bracelet: 1
- Final table: 1
- Money finishes: 8
- Highest WSOP Main Event finish: Winner, 2026

Lucas Jumalon (born March 9, 2004) is an American poker player from Spokane, Washington. In 2026, he won the World Series of Poker Main Event for $10 million.

Jumalon graduated with a degree in business administration from Grand Canyon University in 2026. He began playing poker while still a kid with his father. He started playing tournaments as a teenager, recording cashes in events in Oregon, Florida, and Texas. In 2025, he won a WSOP Daily Deepstacks event for $22,000, his biggest career score before the Main Event. He also made the final table of a WSOP Circuit Main Event at Choctaw Casino in Oklahoma in November 2025.

Jumalon first cashed in a WSOP event in 2025 and had seven cashes prior to the 2026 Main Event. He outlasted a field of 9,208 players and began the final table as chip leader with 194,000,000. He never lost the lead during the final table and ended up defeating Finland's Lauri Sääskilahti heads-up when his K♠ 6♦ made trip sixes against Sääskilahti's A♠ 7♦. At the age of 22 years, four months, and 27 days, Jumalon was the second-youngest Main Event champion in WSOP history, behind only Joe Cada – whose win at the 2009 event, eight days before his 22nd birthday, stands as the closest to the minimum possible mark of 21 years plus a few days. (Note: The youngest that a player is allowed to play poker in a Las Vegas casino is on their 21st birthday, and the size of the entry list for the Main Event necessitates a number of days of play before the field is reduced to the champion. In the 2009 event, Cada lowered the record to 21 years, 11 months and 23 days.)
