= Rep Porter =

American poker player (born 1971)

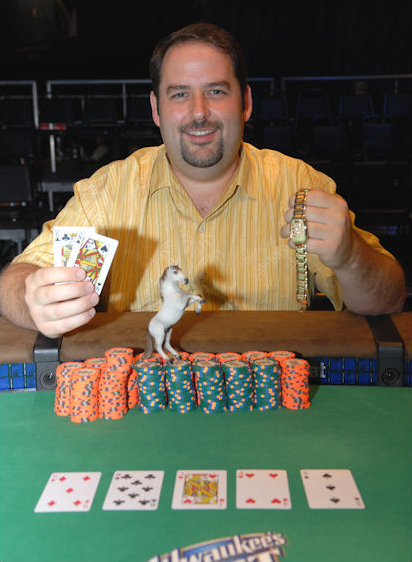
- Porter after winning the $1,500 No-Limit Hold'em Six-Handed event at the 2008 World Series of Poker
- Born: 1971 (age 54–55)

World Series of Poker
- Bracelets: 3
- Money finishes: 53
- Highest WSOP Main Event finish: 12th, 2013

World Poker Tour
- Title: None
- Final table: 1
- Money finishes: 6

Ralph "Rep" Porter (born 1971) is an American professional poker player who won the 2008 World Series of Poker $1,500 No-Limit Hold'em Six-Handed event, the 2011 World Series of Poker $2,500 Seven Card Razz event, and the 2016 World Series of Poker $1,500 Seven Card Razz event.

Porter graduated from the University of Washington and worked as an equity options trader prior to becoming a professional poker player.

== World Series of Poker ==
Porter has 55 cashes at the World Series of Poker (WSOP) among them was making the Final Table in the $1,500 Limit Hold'em Shootout event at the 2006 World Series of Poker, coming in 4th earning $39,339, and a 39th place in the Main Event at the 2007 World Series of Poker, earning $237,865.

On June 5, 2008. Porter won his first World Series of Poker bracelet in the $1,500 Buy-in No-Limit Hold'em Six-Handed event at the 2008 World Series of Poker, earning $372,843.

Porter finished 12th in the 2013 WSOP Main Event, earning $573,204. He cashed in two additional events in the 2013 WSOP, including a 4th-place finish in the $1,500 H.O.R.S.E. event.

In 2018, Porter came in 2nd in the $10k Pot Limit Omaha - Eight Handed Championship, earning his largest prize to date of $629,378.

=== World Series of Poker bracelets ===
Year	Event	Prize Money
2008	$1,500 No-Limit Hold'em (Six-Handed)	$372,843
2011	$2,500 Seven Card Razz	$210,615
2016	$1,500 Seven Card Razz	$142,624

== Other poker events ==
Porter has five cashes in World Poker Tour championship events and came in second in the $2,500 Limit Hold'em event at the 2007 L.A. Poker Classic, earning $48,380 and finishing second at the $9,700 Championship at the 2006 World Series of Poker Circuit event in Caesars - Atlantic City, earning $192,060. In September 2009, Porter placed 4th in the WPT Merit Cyprus Classic, earning $121,115.

As of 2019, his total live tournament winnings exceed $3,980,000. His 55 cashes at the WSOP account for $3,280,000 of those winnings.
