= Ian Johns =

American poker player

World Series of Poker
- Bracelets: 4
- Final tables: 6
- Money finishes: 46
- Highest WSOP Main Event finish: 73rd, 2017

World Poker Tour
- Title: None
- Final table: None
- Money finishes: 2

Ian Johns is an American professional poker player born in Seattle, Washington and now living in Austin, Texas. He has won four bracelets at the World Series of Poker. He won his first bracelet in 2006, his second and third bracelets in 2016, and his fourth bracelet in 2025.

Johns first cashed in the World Series of Poker in 2006 and won his first WSOP bracelet that year in the $3,000 Limit Hold'em event. He defeated a final table that included professional poker players Theo Tran and Mark Newhouse, earning $291,755 for his victory.

Ten years later, Johns won his second and third bracelets during the 2016 World Series of Poker. First he won the $1,500 HORSE tournament, earning his second bracelet and the cash prize of $212,604. He defeated well-known professional poker player and WSOP bracelet winner Justin Bonomo heads-up to win the event. Also at that final table were 1998 World Champion of Poker and five-time WSOP bracelet winner Scotty Nguyen, as well as Svetlana Gromenkova and Andre Akkari who are also bracelet winners. Less than two weeks later, Johns won his third bracelet in the $10,000 Limit Texas hold'em Championship tournament, earning an additional $290,635. At that final table were WSOP bracelet winners Brian Rast, Brock Parker, Bill Chen, and David Chiu. Johns won his fourth career bracelet at the 2025 WSOP in a $10,000 Limit Hold'em Championship Event for $282,455.

As of 2025, Johns' live poker tournament earnings exceed $1,900,000. His 46 cashes at the World Series of Poker make up over $1,400,000 of his total earnings.

== World Series of Poker bracelets ==
Year	Tournament	Prize (US$)
2006	$3,000 Limit Hold'em	$291,755
2016	$1,500 H.O.R.S.E.	$212,604
2016	$10,000 Limit Hold'em Championship	$290,635
2025	$10,000 Limit Hold'em Championship	$282,455
