= Jens Kyllönen =

Finnish poker player (born 1989)

- Nicknames: Jeans89; Ingenious89
- Born: 1989 (age 36–37)

World Series of Poker
- Bracelet: 1
- Money finishes: 2
- Highest WSOP Main Event finish: 113th, 2011

World Poker Tour
- Title: None
- Final table: None
- Money finish: 1

European Poker Tour
- Title: 1
- Final table: 1
- Money finishes: 3

Jens "Jeans89" Kyllönen (born 1989) is a Finnish professional poker player who won the European Poker Tour Copenhagen in February 2009. Kyllönen was the second Finnish EPT winner since Patrik Antonius's victory in 2005. He is an online cash game specialist and plays under the aliases Jeans89 on PokerStars and Ingenious89 on Full Tilt Poker.

In 2009, Jens won the EPT Copenhagen Title for $1,120,815.

In January 2012, he was awarded Finland's best poker player. Kyllönen was rewarded again as Finland's best poker player in January 2013. In October 2014, Kyllönen became a poker coach for Phil Galfond's training website, Run It Once.

As of 2016, his live poker tournament earnings exceed $2,750,000.

== World Series of Poker ==
World Series of Poker bracelets
Year	Event	Prize money
2016	$25,000 High Roller Pot Limit Omaha	$1,127,035
