= Svetlana Gromenkova =

Russian poker player

World Series of Poker
- Bracelet: 1
- Money finishes: 7
- Highest WSOP Main Event finish: None

World Poker Tour
- Title: None
- Final table: None
- Money finishes: 2

Svetlana Gromenkova is a poker player who won the 2008 World Series of Poker $1,000 Ladies - No Limit Hold'em. As of 2008, her total WSOP tournament winnings exceed $240,830.

Gromenkova was born in and raised in Moscow, but during her education in The Maurice Thorez Moscow Institute of Foreign Languages she moved to New York City. In Russia, she played bridge professionally, but after she learned poker in the US, she started to play online poker. Winning at 2008 World Series of Poker was her first major title.

== World Series of Poker bracelets ==
Year	Tournament	Prize (US$)
2008	$1,000 Ladies - No-Limit Hold'em	$240,830
