= Qui Nguyen (poker player) =

Vietnamese-American poker player (born 1977)

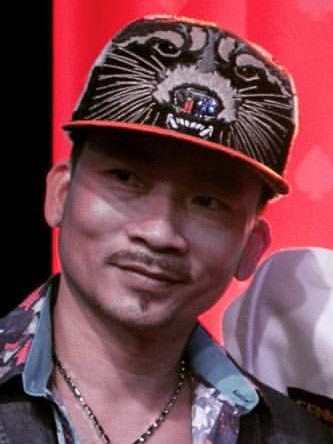
- Nguyen at the 2016 World Series of Poker
- Nickname: Tommy Gun
- Born: 1977 (age 48–49)

World Series of Poker
- Bracelet: 1
- Final table: 1
- Money finishes: 6
- Highest WSOP Main Event finish: Winner, 2016

Qui Nguyen (born 1977) is a Vietnamese-American poker player from Las Vegas, Nevada. He won the 2016 World Series of Poker Main Event, earning $8,005,310.

Nguyen was born in Vietnam before emigrating to the United States in 2001 at the age of 24. He initially settled in California and worked in a nail salon before moving to Las Vegas in 2007. Nguyen began playing poker in 2003, concentrating on small limit hold’em cash games. He turned to no limit games upon arriving to Las Vegas and recorded several cashes in small buy-in events. His only WSOP cash prior to the Main Event came in a $1,500 No Limit Hold’em event in 2009 for $9,029.

Nguyen won his seat in the 2016 Main Event through a $1,100 satellite. He played through the Main Event and reached the November Nine in second chip position. After a final table which lasted 364 hands, Nguyen defeated Gordon Vayo on the 181st hand of heads-up with his K♣ 10♣ against Vayo's J♠ 10♠ on a board of K♦ 9♣ 7♦ 2♠ 3♥.

As of 2024, Nguyen's total live tournament winnings exceed $8,150,000, most of which came from his main event victory.

Qui Nguyen's autobiography, From Vietnam to Vegas! How I won the World Series of Poker Main Event, was published in November 2017 by D&B Publishing. In the 450 page book, Nguyen dissects over 170 key hands from the final table, and tells his life story as well. Steve Blay is the co-author. Steve Blay is the founder of, and software engineer behind, AdvancedPokerTraining.com. Blay used his software to create bots simulating each of the November Nine's playing style. These simulations kept predicting a Qui Nguyen victory. When Nguyen heard of these results, he flew Blay out to Las Vegas to help him train for the final table. After his WSOP victory, D&B publishing reached out to Nguyen and Blay to share their story.

As of November 2017, Qui Nguyen lives in the Summerlin area of Las Vegas, Nevada, with his son Kyle.

== World Series of Poker bracelets ==
Year	Tournament	Prize (US$)
2016	$10,000 No Limit Hold'em Main Event	$8,005,310
