= 2016 World Series of Poker =

Series of poker tournaments

- Location: Rio All-Suite Hotel and Casino, Las Vegas, Nevada
- Dates: May 31 – July 18

Champion
- (Vietnam) Qui Nguyen

The 2016 World Series of Poker was the 47th annual World Series of Poker (WSOP). Most of the events occurred May 31 – July 18 at the Rio All-Suite Hotel & Casino in Las Vegas, Nevada. There were 69 bracelet events, including the $10,000 No Limit Hold'em Main Event which began on July 9. The Main Event final table was reached on July 18, with the November Nine returning to play from October 30 – November 1.

== New events ==
- Event #2: $565 Colossus II No Limit Hold'em - Returning to the schedule after setting a record for largest live tournament in 2015, changes to the event will include a $7 million guaranteed prize pool (an increase of $2 million), a guaranteed first prize of $1 million, and two additional starting flights. The money was reached during each starting flight and gave a player an opportunity to cash multiple times in the event.
- Event #4: $1,000 Top Up Turbo No Limit Hold'em - Players cashing in $55 single table satellites, held both at the Rio and online on WSOP.com, will be able to double their starting stack.
- Event #61: $1,000 Tag Team No Limit Hold'em - Featuring 2-4 player teams. The first team event at the WSOP since 1983.
- In addition to these new events, the structure for $10,000 buy-in events has been changed with players now receiving five times the buy-in for a starting stack.

== Event schedule ==
Online event.

#	Event	Entrants	Winner	Prize	Runner-up	Results
1	$565 Casino Employees No Limit Hold'em	731	Christopher Sand (1/1)	$75,157	Kerryjane Craigie	Results
2	$565 Colossus II No Limit Hold'em	21,613	Ben Keeline (1/1)	$1,000,000	Jiri Horak	Results
3	$10,000 Seven Card Stud Championship	87	Robert Mizrachi (1/4)	$242,662	Matt Grapenthien (0/1)	Results
4	$1,000 Top Up Turbo No Limit Hold'em	667	Kyle Julius (1/1)	$142,972	Bart Lybaert	Results
5	$1,500 Dealers Choice Six-Handed	389	Lawrence Berg (1/1)	$125,466	Yueqi Zhu	Results
6	$1,500 No Limit Hold'em	2,016	Peter Eichhardt (1/1)	$438,417	Davis Aalvik	Results
7	$1,500 2-7 No Limit Draw Lowball	279	Ryan D'Angelo (1/1)	$92,338	John Monnette (0/2)	Results
8	$1,500 H.O.R.S.E.	778	Ian Johns (1/2)	$212,604	Justin Bonomo (0/1)	Results
9	$10,000 Heads Up No Limit Hold'em Championship	153	Alan Percal (1/1)	$320,574	John Smith	Results
10	$1,500 Six-Handed No Limit Hold'em	1,477	Mike Cordell (1/1)	$346,088	Pierre Neuville	Results
11	$10,000 Dealers Choice Six-Handed Championship	118	Jean Gaspard (1/1)	$306,621	William O'Neil	Results
12	$565 Pot Limit Omaha	2,483	Ryan Laplante (1/1)	$190,328	Sean Shah	Results
13	$1,500 Seven Card Razz	461	Rep Porter (1/3)	$142,624	Michael Gathy (0/2)	Results
14	$1,500 Millionaire Maker No Limit Hold'em	7,190	Jason DeWitt (1/2)	$1,065,403	Garrett Greer	Results
15	$1,500 Eight Game Mix	491	Paul Volpe (1/2)	$149,943	Jason Stockfish	Results
16	$10,000 No Limit 2-7 Draw Lowball Championship	100	Jason Mercier (1/4)	$273,335	Mike Watson	Results
17	$1,000 No Limit Hold'em	2,242	Chase Bianchi (1/1)	$316,920	Erik Silberman	Results
18	$3,000 H.O.R.S.E.	400	Marco Johnson (1/2)	$259,730	Jared Talarico	Results
19	$1,000 Pot Limit Omaha	1,106	Sam Soverel (1/1)	$185,317	Kirby Lowery	Results
20	$10,000 Seven Card Razz Championship	100	Ray Dehkharghani (1/1)	$273,338	Jason Mercier (1/4)	Results
21	$3,000 Six-Handed No Limit Hold'em	1,029	Calvin Lee (1/1)	$531,577	Steven Thompson	Results
22	$1,500 Limit Hold'em	665	Danny Le (1/1)	$188,815	Scott Farnsworth	Results
23	$2,000 No Limit Hold'em	1,419	Cesar Garcia (1/1)	$447,739	Viliyan Petleshkov	Results
24	$10,000 H.O.R.S.E. Championship	171	Jason Mercier (2/5)	$422,874	James Obst	Results
25	$2,500 No Limit Hold'em	1,045	Michael Gagliano (1/1)	$448,463	Daniel Cooke	Results
26	$1,500 Omaha Hi-Low Split-8 or Better	934	Benny Glaser (1/2)	$244,103	Benjamin Gold	Results
27	$1,000 Seniors No Limit Hold'em Championship	4,499	Johnnie Craig (1/1)	$538,204	Jamshid Lotfi	Results
28	$10,000 Limit Hold'em Championship	110	Ian Johns (2/3)	$290,635	Sean Berrios	Results
29	$1,500 No Limit Hold'em	1,796	Alexander Ziskin (1/1)	$401,494	Jens Grieme	Results
30	$3,000 Six-Handed Pot Limit Omaha	580	Viatcheslav Ortynskiy (1/1)	$344,327	Rafael Lebron	Results
31	$1,000 Super Seniors No Limit Hold'em	1,476	James Moore (1/1)	$230,626	Charles Barker	Results
32	$10,000 Omaha Hi-Low Split-8 or Better Championship	163	Benny Glaser (2/3)	$407,194	Doug Lorgeree	Results
33	$1,500 Summer Solstice No Limit Hold'em	1,840	Adrian Mateos (1/2)	$409,171	Koray Aldemir	Results
34	$1,500 2-7 Limit Triple Draw Lowball	358	Andrey Zaichenko (1/1)	$117,947	Jameson Painter	Results
35	$5,000 Six-Handed No Limit Hold'em	541	Michael Gathy (1/3)	$560,843	Adrien Allain	Results
36	$2,500 Mixed Omaha/Seven Card Stud Hi-Lo 8 or Better	394	Hani Awad (1/1)	$213,186	Fabrice Soulier (0/1)	Results
37	$1,500 Pot Limit Omaha	776	Jiaqi Xu (1/1)	$212,128	Jeffrey Duvall	Results
38	$3,000 Six-Handed Limit Hold'em	245	Rafael Lebron (1/1)	$169,337	Georgios Zisimopoulos	Results
39	$10,000 Six-Handed No Limit Hold'em Championship	294	Martin Kozlov (1/1)	$665,709	Davidi Kitai (0/3)	Results
40	$2,500 Mixed Limit Triple Draw Lowball	236	Christopher Vitch (1/1)	$136,854	Sigi Stockinger	Results
41	$1,500 Monster Stack No Limit Hold'em	6,927	Mitchell Towner (1/1)	$1,120,196	Dorian Rios	Results
42	$3,000 Shootout No Limit Hold'em	400	Phillip McAllister (1/1)	$267,720	Kyle Montgomery	Results
43	$10,000 Seven Card Stud Hi-Lo Split-8 or Better Championship	136	George Danzer (1/4)	$338,646	Randy Ohel	Results
44	$1,000 No Limit Hold'em	2,076	Steven Wolansky (1/2)	$298,849	Wenlong Jin	Results
45	$1,500 Mixed No Limit Hold'em/Pot Limit Omaha	919	Loren Klein (1/1)	$241,427	Dmitry Savelyev	Results
46	$1,500 Bounty No Limit Hold'em	2,158	Kristen Bicknell (1/2)	$290,768	Norbert Szecsi (0/1)	Results
47	$10,000 2-7 Limit Triple Draw Lowball Championship	125	John Hennigan (1/4)	$320,103	Michael Gathy (1/3)	Results
48	$5,000 No Limit Hold'em	524	Ankush Mandavia (1/1)	$548,139	Daniel Strelitz	Results
49	$1,500 Seven Card Stud	331	Shaun Deeb (1/2)	$111,101	Adam Friedman (0/1)	Results
50	$1,500 Shootout No Limit Hold'em	1,050	Safiya Umerova (1/1)	$264,046	Niall Farrell	Results
51	$10,000 Eight-Handed Pot Limit Omaha Championship	400	Brandon Shack-Harris (1/2)	$894,300	Loren Klein (1/1)	Results
52	$3,000 No Limit Hold'em	1,125	Andrew Lichtenberger (1/1)	$569,158	Craig Blight	Results
53	$1,500 Mixed Pot Limit Omaha 8 or Better & Big O	668	Allan Le (1/1)	$189,223	Philipp Eirisch	Results
54	$888 Crazy Eights Eight-Handed No Limit Hold'em	6,761	Hung Le (1/1)	$888,888	Michael Lech	Results
55	$50,000 Poker Players Championship	91	Brian Rast (1/3)	$1,296,097	Justin Bonomo (0/1)	Results
56	$1,500 No Limit Hold'em	1,860	David Peters (1/1)	$412,557	Cathal Shine	Results
57	$1,500 Pot Limit Omaha Hi-Lo Split-8 or Better	732	David Nowakowski (1/1)	$203,113	Timothy Vukson	Results
58	$1,000 No Limit Hold'em	1,397	Corey Thompson (1/1)	$221,163	Enrico Rudelitz	Results
59	$5,000 No Limit Hold'em	863	Yue Du (1/1)	$800,586	Michael Gentili	Results
60	$1,500 Seven Card Stud Hi-Lo 8 or Better	521	David Prociak (1/1)	$156,546	Brandon Shack-Harris (1/2)	Results
61	$1,000 Tag Team No Limit Hold'em	863	Ryan Fee (1/1); Doug Polk (1/2)	$153,358	Adam Greenberg; Niel Mittelman; Gabriel Paul	Results
62	$25,000 High Roller Pot Limit Omaha	184	Jens Kyllönen (1/1)	$1,127,035	Tommy Le	Results
63	$1,000 No Limit Hold'em	2,452	Tony Dunst (1/1)	$339,254	Jason Rivkin	Results
64	$3,000 Pot Limit Omaha Hi-Lo Split 8 or Better	473	Kyle Bowker (1/1)	$294,960	Kate Hoang	Results
65	$10,000/$1,000 Ladies No Limit Hold'em Championship	819	Courtney Kennedy (1/1)	$149,108	Amanda Baker	Results
66	$1,000 WSOP.com Online No Limit Hold'em	1,247	Clayton Maguire (1/1)	$210,279	Simeon Naydenov (0/1)	Results
67	$111,111 High Roller for One Drop No Limit Hold'em	183	Fedor Holz (1/1)	$4,981,775	Dan Smith	Results
68	$10,000 Main Event No Limit Hold'em Championship	6,737	Qui Nguyen (1/1)	$8,005,310	Gordon Vayo	Results
69	$1,000 + 111 Little One for One Drop No Limit Hold'em	4,360	Michael Tureniec (1/1)	$525,520	Calvin Anderson (0/1)	Results

== Player of the Year ==
Final standings as of July 18 (end of WSOP):

Standings
Rank	Name	Points	Bracelets
1	(United States) Jason Mercier	2,195.57	2
2	(United States) Paul Volpe	1,923.66	1
3	(United Kingdom) Max Silver	1,687.67	0
4	(United States) John Monnette	1,591.35	0
5	(United States) Justin Bonomo	1,515.94	0
6	(Belgium) Michael Gathy	1,505.31	1
7	(Australia) Martin Kozlov	1,501.39	1
8	(United Kingdom) David Vamplew	1,496.22	0
9	(United States) Chris Ferguson	1,469.57	0
10	(United Kingdom) Benny Glaser	1,422.54	2

== Main Event ==
The $10,000 Main Event No Limit Hold'em Championship began on July 9 with the first of three starting flights. The November Nine was reached on July 18, with the final table being contested over three days from October 30 – November 1.

The Main Event attracted 6,737 players, generating a prize pool of $63,327,800. The top 1,011 players finished in the money, with the winner earning $8,005,310.

=== Performance of past champions ===
Name	Championship Year(s)	Day of Elimination
Tom McEvoy	1983	4 (644th)*
Johnny Chan	1987, 1988	5 (180th)*
Phil Hellmuth	1989	3
Huck Seed	1996	1C
Scotty Nguyen	1998	2C
Chris Ferguson	2000	2AB
Robert Varkonyi	2002	1B
Chris Moneymaker	2003	2C
Greg Raymer	2004	5 (122nd)*
Joe Hachem	2005	2C
Jamie Gold	2006	1C
Joe Cada	2009	2C
Jonathan Duhamel	2010	1C
Greg Merson	2012	2C
Ryan Riess	2013	4 (271st)*
Martin Jacobson	2014	2C
Joe McKeehen	2015	3

* Indicates the place of a player who finished in the money

=== Other notable high finishes ===
NB: This list is restricted to top 100 finishers with an existing Wikipedia entry.

Place	Name	Prize
11th	John Cynn	$650,000
13th	James Obst	$427,930
14th	Tom Marchese	$427,930
17th	William Kassouf	$338,288
25th	Antoine Saout	$269,430
29th	Paul Volpe	$216,211
31st	Dan Colman	$216,211
35th	Alex Keating	$216,211
50th	Anthony Gregg	$142,447
60th	Brian Yoon	$116,963
87th	Mike Gorodinsky	$67,855
88th	Daniel Zack	$67,855

=== November Nine ===
Name	Number of chips (percentage of total)	WSOP Bracelets	WSOP Cashes*	WSOP Earnings*
(United States) Cliff Josephy	74,600,000 (22.2%)	2	17	$810,358
(Vietnam) Qui Nguyen	67,925,000 (20.2%)	0	1	$9,029
(United States) Gordon Vayo	49,375,000 (14.7%)	0	26	$608,136
(Belgium) Kenny Hallaert	43,325,000 (12.9%)	0	22	$367,855
(United States) Michael Ruane	41,600,000 (9.4%)	0	3	$24,438
(Czech Republic) Vojtech Ruzicka	27,300,000 (8.1%)	0	17	$138,585
(Canada) Griffin Benger	26,175,000 (7.8%)	0	13	$231,201
(United States) Jerry Wong	10,175,000 (3.0%)	0	19	$118,156
(Spain) Fernando Pons	6,150,000 (1.8%)	0	0	0

*Career statistics prior to the beginning of the 2016 Main Event.

=== Final Table ===
Place	Name	Prize
1st	Qui Nguyen	$8,005,310
2nd	Gordon Vayo	$4,661,228
3rd	Cliff Josephy	$3,453,035
4th	Michael Ruane	$2,576,003
5th	Vojtech Ruzicka	$1,935,288
6th	Kenny Hallaert	$1,464,258
7th	Griffin Benger	$1,250,190
8th	Jerry Wong	$1,100,076
9th	Fernando Pons	$1,000,000
