= 2019 World Series of Poker results =

Below are the results of the 2019 World Series of Poker, held from May 29-July 16 at the Rio All-Suite Hotel and Casino in Las Vegas, Nevada.

== Key ==
*	Elected to the Poker Hall of Fame
(#/#)	This denotes a bracelet winner. The first number is the number of bracelets won in the 2019 WSOP. The second number is the total number of bracelets won. Both numbers represent totals as of that point during the tournament.
Place	What place each player at the final table finished
Name	The player who made it to the final table
Prize (US$)	The amount of money awarded for each finish at the event's final table

== Results ==
=== 2019 WSOP Event #1: $500 Casino Employees No Limit Hold'em ===
- 3-Day Event: May 29-31
- Number of Entries: 686
- Total Prize Pool: $298,410
- Number of Payouts: 103
- Winning Hand: K♠ 8♦

Final Table
Place	Name	Prize
1st	Nicholas Haynes (1/1)	$62,345
2nd	Isaac Hanson	$38,503
3rd	Jorge Ruiz	$26,681
4th	Jesse Kertland	$18,785
5th	Adam Lamers	$13,441
6th	Jeffrey Fast	$9,776
7th	Christopher Bowen	$7,229
8th	Joseph Appler	$5,438
9th	Travis Williams	$4,161

=== Event #2: $10,000 Super Turbo Bounty ===
- 2-Day Event: May 29-30
- Number of Entries: 204
- Total Prize Pool: $1,917,600
- Number of Payouts: 31
- Winning Hand: A♦ 9♥

Final Table
Place	Name	Prize
1st	Brian Green (1/1)	$345,669
2nd	Ali Imsirovic	$213,644
3rd	Asher Conniff	$145,097
4th	Loren Klein (0/3)	$100,775
5th	Ping Liu	$71,614
6th	Daniel Negreanu* (0/6)	$52,099
7th	Martijn Gerrits	$38,823
8th	Zachary Clark	$29,650
9th	Cary Katz	$23,224

=== Event #3: $500 Big 50 No Limit Hold'em ===
- 9-Day Event: May 30-June 7
- Number of Entries: 28,371
- Total Prize Pool: $13,509,435
- Number of Payouts: 4,258
- Winning Hand: A♥ A♦
- Note: Set a new record for largest live poker tournament

Final Table
Place	Name	Prize
1st	Femi Fashakin (1/1)	$1,147,449
2nd	Paul Cullen	$709,183
3rd	Rafi Elharar	$534,574
4th	Nick Chow	$405,132
5th	Walter Atwood	$308,701
6th	Danny Ghobrial	$236,508
7th	Adrian Curry	$182,192
8th	Morten Christensen	$141,126
9th	David Rasmussen	$109,922

=== Event #4: $1,500 Omaha Hi/Lo 8 or Better ===
- 4-Day Event: May 30-June 2
- Number of Entries: 853
- Total Prize Pool: $1,151,550
- Number of Payouts: 128
- Winning Hand: A♠ A♣ Q♦ 7♥

Final Table
Place	Name	Prize
1st	Derek McMaster (1/1)	$228,228
2nd	Jason Berilgen	$141,007
3rd	John Esposito (0/1)	$98,807
4th	David Halpern (0/1)	$70,231
5th	Joseph Aronesty	$50,646
6th	Tom McCormick	$37,063
7th	Ben Yu (0/3)	$27,530
8th	Shannon Shorr	$20,760
9th	Patrick Leonard	$15,897

=== Event #5: $50,000 No Limit Hold'em High Roller ===
- 4-Day Event: May 31-June 3
- Number of Entries: 110
- Total Prize Pool: $5,280,000
- Number of Payouts: 17
- Winning Hand: A♣ J♠

Final Table
Place	Name	Prize
1st	Ben Heath (1/1)	$1,484,085
2nd	Andrew Lichtenberger (0/1)	$917,232
3rd	Sam Soverel (0/1)	$640,924
4th	Dmitry Yurasov (0/1)	$458,138
5th	Nick Petrangelo (0/2)	$335,181
6th	Chance Kornuth (0/2)	$251,128
7th	Elio Fox (0/2)	$192,794
8th	Cary Katz	$151,755

=== Event #6: $2,500 Limit Mixed Triple Draw ===
- 3-Day Event: June 1-3
- Number of Entries: 296
- Total Prize Pool: $666,000
- Number of Payouts: 45
- Winning Hand: 7♠ 5♥ 4♦ 3♠ 2♣

Final Table
Place	Name	Prize
1st	Daniel Zack (1/1)	$160,447
2nd	Sumir Mathur	$99,153
3rd	Brayden Gazlay	$65,217
4th	Jon Turner	$43,984
5th	Jesse Hampton	$30,437
6th	Jake Schwartz	$21,625

=== Event #7: $400 WSOP.com Online No Limit Hold'em ===
- 1-Day Event: June 2
- Number of Entries: 2,825
- Total Prize Pool: $1,017,002
- Number of Payouts: 333
- Winning Hand: 7♥ 6♦

Final Table
Place	Name	Prize
1st	Yong Kwon (1/1)	$165,263
2nd	Gabor Szabo	$99,361
3rd	Scott Eskenazi	$73,021
4th	Frederic Roetker	$53,494
5th	Phil Hellmuth* (0/15)	$39,460
6th	Phillip Raetz	$29,493
7th	Dan O'Brien	$22,374
8th	Steve Cicak	$17,086
9th	Samuel Uhlmann	$13,119

=== Event #8: $10,000 Short Deck No Limit Hold'em ===
- 3-Day Event: June 2-4
- Number of Entries: 114
- Total Prize Pool: $1,071,600
- Number of Payouts: 18
- Winning Hand: J♠ 10♠

Final Table
Place	Name	Prize
1st	Alex Epstein (1/1)	$296,227
2nd	Thai Ha	$183,081
3rd	Anson Tsang (0/1)	$130,482
4th	Chance Kornuth (0/2)	$93,593
5th	Rene van Krevelen	$67,566
6th	Yong Wang	$49,095

=== Event #9: $600 No Limit Hold'em Deepstack ===
- 2-Day Event: June 3-4
- Number of Entries: 6,151
- Total Prize Pool: $3,229,275
- Number of Payouts: 923
- Winning Hand: A♥ K♠

Final Table
Place	Name	Prize
1st	Jeremy Pekarek (1/1)	$398,281
2nd	Dan Kuntzman	$245,881
3rd	Juan Magana	$182,173
4th	Benjamin Underwood	$135,959
5th	Noomis Jones	$102,216
6th	Tan Nguyen	$77,418
7th	Paul Jain	$59,075
8th	John Skrovan	$45,418
9th	David Elet	$35,183

=== Event #10: $1,500 Dealers Choice ===
- 3-Day Event: June 3-5
- Number of Entries: 470
- Total Prize Pool: $634,500
- Number of Payouts: 71
- Winning Hand: K♣ 10♥ (No Limit Hold'em)

Final Table
Place	Name	Prize
1st	Scott Clements (1/3)	$144,957
2nd	Tim McDermott	$89,567
3rd	Michael Ross	$58,718
4th	Naoya Kihara (0/1)	$39,377
5th	Wes Self	$27,027
6th	Benny Glaser (0/3)	$18,996

=== Event #11: $5,000 No Limit Hold'em ===
- 4-Day Event: June 3-6
- Number of Entries: 400
- Total Prize Pool: $1,860,000
- Number of Payouts: 60
- Winning Hand: 10♥ 10♦

Final Table
Place	Name	Prize
1st	Daniel Strelitz (1/1)	$442,385
2nd	Shannon Shorr	$273,416
3rd	Ognjen Sekularac	$186,050
4th	Ali Imsirovic	$129,018
5th	Maria Ho	$91,211
6th	Arsenii Karmatckii	$65,764
7th	Maria McAlpin	$48,377
8th	Pauli Ayras	$36,323
9th	Michael O'Grady	$27,878

=== Event #12: $1,000 No Limit Hold'em Super Turbo Bounty ===
- 1-Day Event: June 4
- Number of Entries: 2,452
- Total Prize Pool: $22,068,000
- Number of Payouts: 368
- Winning Hand: 8♣ 5♣

Final Table
Place	Name	Prize
1st	Daniel Park (1/1)	$226,243
2nd	Erik Cajelais (0/1)	$139,731
3rd	Jennifer Dennis	$102,010
4th	Emil Tiller	$75,149
5th	Marcelo Giordano Mendes	$55,869
6th	John Yelaney	$41,920
7th	Travis Sargent	$31,748
8th	Lian Liu	$24,271
9th	Ferit Bulut	$18,731

=== Event #13: $1,500 No Limit 2-7 Lowball Draw ===
- 3-Day Event: June 4-6
- Number of Entries: 296
- Total Prize Pool: $399,600
- Number of Payouts: 44
- Winning Hand: 9♣ 7♠ 6♥ 3♣ 2♠

Final Table
Place	Name	Prize
1st	Yuval Bronshtein (1/1)	$96,278
2nd	Ajay Chabra	$59,491
3rd	Jerry Wong	$39,986
4th	Steven Tabb	$27,477
5th	Michael Sortino	$19,313
6th	Bjorn Geissert	$13,892
7th	Craig Chait	$10,232

=== Event #14: $1,500 H.O.R.S.E. ===
- 4-Day Event: June 5-8
- Number of Entries: 751
- Total Prize Pool: $1,013,850
- Number of Payouts: 113
- Winning Hand: K♠ 7♥ 4♥ 4♠ (Omaha Hi-Lo)

Final Table
Place	Name	Prize
1st	Murilo Souza (1/1)	$207,003
2nd	Jason Stockfish	$127,932
3rd	Gary Kosakowski	$89,730
4th	Phil Hui (0/1)	$63,860
5th	Chris Klodnicki (0/1)	$46,127
6th	Alex Dovzhenko	$33,822
7th	Joseph Aronesty	$25,181
8th	Danny Woolard	$19,040

=== Event #15: $10,000 Heads Up No Limit Hold'em ===
- 4-Day Event: June 5-8
- Number of Entries: 112
- Total Prize Pool: $1,052,800
- Number of Payouts: 8
- Winning Hand: 8♥ 6♥

Final Table
Place	Name	Prize
1st	Sean Swingruber (1/1)	$186,356
2nd	Ben Yu (0/3)	$115,174
SF	Cord Garcia (0/1)	$73,333
SF	Keith Lehr (0/2)	$73,333
QF	Jimmy D'Ambrosio	$31,151
QF	Jake Schindler	$31,151
QF	Kristen Bicknell (0/2)	$31,151
QF	Matthias Eibinger	$31,151

=== Event #16: $1,500 No Limit Hold'em 6-Handed ===
- 4-Day Event: June 5-8
- Number of Entries: 1,832
- Total Prize Pool: $2,473,200
- Number of Payouts: 275
- Winning Hand: A♣ A♥

Final Table
Place	Name	Prize
1st	Isaac Baron (1/1)	$407,739
2nd	Ong Dingxiang	$251,937
3rd	Stephen Graner	$177,085
4th	James Hughes	$126,011
5th	Richard Hasnip	$90,791
6th	Cameron Marshall	$66,243

=== Event #17: $1,500 No Limit Hold'em Shootout ===
- 3-Day Event: June 6-8
- Number of Entries: 917
- Total Prize Pool: $1,237,950
- Number of Payouts: 100
- Winning Hand: A♠ A♦

Final Table
Place	Name	Prize
1st	Brett Apter (1/1)	$238,824
2nd	Anatolii Zyrin	$147,594
3rd	Tommy Nguyen (0/1)	$106,351
4th	Adrian Scarpa	$77,591
5th	Manuel Ruivo	$57,326
6th	Cary Katz	$42,897
7th	Shintaro Baba	$32,517
8th	Michael O'Grady	$24,973
9th	Kenna James	$19,436
10th	Marko Maher	$15,331

=== Event #18: $10,000 Omaha Hi-Lo 8 or Better ===
- 4-Day Event: June 6-9
- Number of Entries: 183
- Total Prize Pool: $1,720,200
- Number of Payouts: 28
- Winning Hand: A♥ 9♠ 8♦ 2♠

Final Table
Place	Name	Prize
1st	Frankie O'Dell (1/3)	$443,641
2nd	Owais Ahmed (0/1)	$274,192
3rd	Robert Mizrachi (0/4)	$194,850
4th	Nick Guagenti	$140,522
5th	Robert Campbell	$102,868
6th	Jake Schwartz	$76,456
7th	David Benyamine (0/1)	$57,709
8th	Ed Vartughian	$44,245
9th	Shaun Deeb (0/4)	$34,467

=== Event #19: $1,500 Millionaire Maker No Limit Hold'em ===
- 5-Day Event: June 7-12
- Number of Entries: 8,809
- Total Prize Pool: $11,892,150
- Number of Payouts: 1,322
- Winning Hand: Q♣ 7♥

Final Table
Place	Name	Prize
1st	John Gorsuch (1/1)	$1,344,930
2nd	Kazuki Ikeuchi	$830,783
3rd	Lokesh Garg	$619,017
4th	Vincas Tamasauskas	$464,375
5th	Joshua Thibodaux	$350,758
6th	Cory Albertson	$266,771
7th	Bob Shao	$204,306
8th	Fabian Gumz	$157,565
9th	Josh Reichard	$122,375

=== Event #20: $1,500 Seven Card Stud ===
- 4-Day Event: June 7-10
- Number of Entries: 285
- Total Prize Pool: $384,750
- Number of Payouts: 43
- Winning Hand: 6♣ 5♣ 4♥ 3♠ 2♦ 4♦ A♣

Final Table
Place	Name	Prize
1st	Eli Elezra (1/4)	$93,766
2nd	Anthony Zinno (0/1)	$57,951
3rd	Valentin Vornicu	$39,830
4th	Tab Thiptinnakon	$27,933
5th	Rep Porter (0/3)	$19,996
6th	David Singer (0/2)	$14,619
7th	Joshua Mountain	$10,920
8th	Scott Seiver (0/2)	$8,337

=== Event #21: $10,000 No Limit 2-7 Lowball Draw ===
- 4-Day Event: June 8-11
- Number of Entries: 91
- Total Prize Pool: $855,400
- Number of Payouts: 14
- Winning Hand: 9♥ 8♠ 6♥ 4♦ 2♠
- Note: Bechtel's first bracelet in 26 years, the longest span between wins in WSOP history

Final Table
Place	Name	Prize
1st	Jim Bechtel (1/2)	$253,817
2nd	Vince Musso	$156,872
3rd	Darren Elias	$109,738
4th	Prahlad Friedman (0/1)	$78,157
5th	Jean-Robert Bellande (0/1)	$56,693
6th	Pedro Bromfman	$41,897
7th	Paul Volpe (0/3)	$31,556

=== Event #22: $1,000 Double Stack No Limit Hold'em ===
- 2-Day Event: June 9-10
- Number of Entries: 3,253
- Total Prize Pool: $2,927,700
- Number of Payouts: 488
- Winning Hand: A♦ 4♣

Final Table
Place	Name	Prize
1st	Jorden Fox (1/1)	$420,693
2nd	Jayachandra Gangaiah	$259,834
3rd	Jeffrey Smith (0/1)	$191,789
4th	Simon Legat	$142,648
5th	Marco Garcia	$106,917
6th	Ryan Teves	$80,760
7th	Scott Vener	$61,480
8th	Andrew Glauberg	$47,173
9th	Christopher Andler	$36,484

=== Event #23: $1,500 Eight Game Mix ===
- 4-Day Event: June 9-12
- Number of Entries: 612
- Total Prize Pool: $826,200
- Number of Payouts: 92
- Winning Hand: Q♥ 5♠ (Limit Hold'em)

Final Table
Place	Name	Prize
1st	Rami Boukai (1/2)	$177,294
2nd	John Evans	$109,553
3rd	Chris Klodnicki (0/1)	$72,933
4th	Philip Long (0/1)	$49,531
5th	Allen Kessler	$34,329
6th	Donny Rubinstein	$24,292

=== Event #24: $600 WSOP.com Online Pot Limit Omaha 6-Handed ===
- 1-Day Event: June 9
- Number of Entries: 1,216
- Total Prize Pool: $656,640
- Number of Payouts: 99
- Winning Hand: A♥ K♣ 8♥ 5♠

Final Table
Place	Name	Prize
1st	Josh Pollock (1/2)	$139,470
2nd	Jason Gooch	$85,560
3rd	Jared Bleznick	$59,163
4th	Martin Zamani	$41,565
5th	Phil Galfond (0/3)	$29,680
6th	Chris Back	$21,538

=== Event #25: $600 Pot Limit Omaha Deepstack ===
- 3-Day Event: June 10-12
- Number of Entries: 2,577
- Total Prize Pool: $1,352,925
- Number of Payouts: 387
- Winning Hand: K♥ Q♦ J♥ 9♦

Final Table
Place	Name	Prize
1st	Andrew Donabedian (1/1)	$205,605
2nd	Todd Dreyer	$126,948
3rd	Robert Valden	$92,672
4th	Corey Wright	$68,258
5th	Mihai Niste	$50,732
6th	Alexandru Ivan	$38,051
7th	Tom Franklin (0/1)	$28,803
8th	Florian Fuchs	$22,006
9th	Alexander Condon	$16,971

=== Event #26: $2,620 No Limit Hold'em Marathon ===
- 6-Day Event: June 10-15
- Number of Entries: 1,083
- Total Prize Pool: $2,553,714
- Number of Payouts: 163
- Winning Hand: A♥ K♥

Final Table
Place	Name	Prize
1st	Roman Korenev (1/1)	$477,401
2nd	Jared Koppel	$295,008
3rd	Dong Sheng Peng	$208,726
4th	Francis Anderson	$149,605
5th	Joe Curcio	$108,646
6th	Joseph Liberta	$79,957
7th	Matt Russell	$59,642
8th	Gustavo Da Rosa Muniz	$45,100
9th	Peter Hong	$34,580

=== Event #27: $1,500 Seven Card Stud Hi/Lo 8 or Better ===
- 4-Day Event: June 10-13
- Number of Entries: 460
- Total Prize Pool: $621,000
- Number of Payouts: 69
- Winning Hand: 3♦ 9♦ 8♦ 9♥ 2♥ 3♠ 10♠

Final Table
Place	Name	Prize
1st	Michael Mizrachi (1/5)	$142,801
2nd	Robert Gray	$88,254
3rd	Michael Sopko	$60,330
4th	Elias Hourani	$42,014
5th	Jan Stein	$29,818
6th	Jose Paz-Gutierrez	$21,575
7th	Martin Sawtell	$15,921
8th	Matthew Schultz	$11,986

=== Event #28: $1,000 No Limit Hold'em ===
- 3-Day Event: June 11-13
- Number of Entries: 2,477
- Total Prize Pool: $2,229,300
- Number of Payouts: 372
- Winning Hand: 9♥ 9♦

Final Table
Place	Name	Prize
1st	Stephen Song (1/1)	$341,854
2nd	Scot Masters	$211,177
3rd	Ryan Laplante (0/1)	$154,268
4th	Renato Kaneoya	$113,712
5th	Sevak Mikaiel	$84,581
6th	Dominic Coombe	$63,491
7th	Pedro Ingles	$48,101
8th	Vegard Ropstad	$36,783
9th	Yosef Lider	$28,394

=== Event #29: $10,000 H.O.R.S.E. ===
- 4-Day Event: June 11-14
- Number of Entries: 172
- Total Prize Pool: $1,616,800
- Number of Payouts: 26
- Winning Hand: K♥ Q♠ Q♥ 8♥ 2♥ 3♣ A♥ (Stud Hi-Lo)

Final Table
Place	Name	Prize
1st	Greg Mueller (1/3)	$425,347
2nd	Daniel Ospina (0/1)	$262,882
3rd	Dario Sammartino	$184,854
4th	Scott Clements (1/3)	$132,288
5th	Craig Chait	$96,378
6th	Mikhail Semin	$71,505
7th	Matthew Gonzales	$54,043
8th	Phil Galfond (0/3)	$41,625

=== Event #30: $1,000 Pot Limit Omaha ===
- 4-Day Event: June 12-15
- Number of Entries: 1,526
- Total Prize Pool: $1,374,300
- Number of Payouts: 229
- Winning Hand: 8♥ 7♣ 5♦ 2♣

Final Table
Place	Name	Prize
1st	Luis Zedan (1/1)	$236,673
2nd	Thida Lin	$146,196
3rd	Sam Razavi	$104,888
4th	Ryan Robinson	$76,101
5th	Ryan Goindoo	$55,845
6th	Gregory Donatelli	$41,453
7th	Christopher Conrad	$31,130
8th	Stanislav Parkhomenko	$23,654
9th	Erik Wilcke	$18,188

=== Event #31: $3,000 No Limit Hold'em 6-Handed ===
- 3-Day Event: June 12-14
- Number of Entries: 754
- Total Prize Pool: $2,035,800
- Number of Payouts: 114
- Winning Hand: J♦ 2♦

Final Table
Place	Name	Prize
1st	Thomas Cazayous (1/1)	$414,766
2nd	Nicholas Howard	$256,314
3rd	Upeshka De Silva (0/2)	$172,658
4th	Wojtek Barzantny	$118,421
5th	Angel Guillen (0/1)	$82,726
6th	Raul Martinez	$58,881

=== Event #32: $1,000 Seniors No Limit Hold'em ===
- 4-Day Event: June 13-16
- Number of Entries: 5,917
- Total Prize Pool: $5,325,300
- Number of Payouts: 888
- Winning Hand: Q♣ Q♠

Final Table
Place	Name	Prize
1st	Howard Mash (1/1)	$662,594
2nd	Jean-Rene Fontaine	$409,249
3rd	James McNurlan	$303,705
4th	Adam Richardson	$226,996
5th	Donald Matusow	$170,887
6th	Farhad Jamasi	$129,582
7th	Samir Husaynue	$98,981
8th	Mike Lisanti	$76,165
9th	Mansour Alipourfard	$59,044

=== Event #33: $1,500 Limit 2-7 Lowball Triple Draw ===
- 3-Day Event: June 13-15
- Number of Entries: 467
- Total Prize Pool: $630,450
- Number of Payouts: 71
- Winning Hand: 9♣ 8♣ 5♦ 4♦ 3♦

Final Table
Place	Name	Prize
1st	Robert Campbell (1/1)	$144,027
2nd	David Bach (0/3)	$88,995
3rd	Jared Bleznick	$58,343
4th	Kyle Miaso	$39,126
5th	Jesse Hampton	$26,855
6th	Aron Dermer	$18,875

=== Event #34: $1,000 Double Stack No Limit Hold'em ===
- 6-Day Event: June 14-19
- Number of Entries: 6,214
- Total Prize Pool: $5,592,600
- Number of Payouts: 933
- Winning Hand: K♣ J♠

Final Table
Place	Name	Prize
1st	Joseph Cheong (1/1)	$687,782
2nd	David Ivers	$424,791
3rd	Zinan Wu	$314,876
4th	Andrea Buonocore	$235,099
5th	Arianna Son	$176,820
6th	Ido Ashkenazi	$133,970
7th	David Guay	$102,258
8th	Ivan Deyra	$78,638
9th	Brock Wilson	$60,930

=== Event #35: $10,000 Dealers Choice 6-Handed ===
- 4-Day Event: June 14-17
- Number of Entries: 122
- Total Prize Pool: $1,146,800
- Number of Payouts: 19
- Winning Hand: 8♦ 7♣ (No Limit Hold'em)
- Note: Friedman won the event for the second straight year

Final Table
Place	Name	Prize
1st	Adam Friedman (1/3)	$312,417
2nd	Shaun Deeb (0/4)	$193,090
3rd	Matt Glantz	$139,126
4th	David Moskowitz	$100,440
5th	Michael McKenna	$72,653
6th	Nick Schulman (0/2)	$52,656

=== Event #36: $3,000 No Limit Hold'em Shootout ===
- 3-Day Event: June 15-17
- Number of Entries: 313
- Total Prize Pool: $845,100
- Number of Payouts: 40
- Winning Hand: 4♠ 4♣

Final Table
Place	Name	Prize
1st	David Lambard (1/1)	$207,193
2nd	Johan Guilbert	$128,042
3rd	Weiyi Zhang	$92,625
4th	Andrew Lichtenberger (0/1)	$67,706
5th	Jan Lakota	$50,016
6th	Ben Farrell	$37,342
7th	Alexandru Papazian (0/1)	$28,182
8th	Adrien Delmas	$21,501
9th	Martin Zamani	$16,586
10th	Justin Bonomo (0/3)	$12,937

=== Event #37: $800 No Limit Hold'em Deepstack ===
- 3-Day Event: June 16-18
- Number of Entries: 2,808
- Total Prize Pool: $1,999,296
- Number of Payouts: 422
- Winning Hand: A♥ A♠

Final Table
Place	Name	Prize
1st	Robert Mitchell (1/1)	$297,537
2nd	Marco Bognanni	$183,742
3rd	Axel Hallay	$134,817
4th	Francois Evard	$99,752
5th	Benjamin Underwood	$74,435
6th	Kamel Mokhammad	$56,019
7th	Benjamin Moon (0/1)	$42,524
8th	Zachary Mullennix	$32,561
9th	Nick Jivkov (0/1)	$25,152

=== Event #38: $600 WSOP.com Online No Limit Hold'em Knockout Bounty ===
- 1-Day Event: June 16
- Number of Entries: 1,224
- Total Prize Pool: $673,200
- Number of Payouts: 207
- Winning Hand: 10-10

Final Table
Place	Name	Prize
1st	Upeshka De Silva (1/3)	$98,263
2nd	David Nodes	$60,092
3rd	David Fhima	$42,962
4th	Gerard Carbo	$31,065
5th	Renato Ribeiro	$22,748
6th	Yotam Shmuelov	$16,854
7th	Chris Johnson	$12,668
8th	Joseph Liberta	$9,584
9th	Steven Bordonaro	$7,381

=== Event #39: $1,000 Super Seniors No Limit Hold'em ===
- 4-Day Event: June 17-20
- Number of Entries: 2,650
- Total Prize Pool: $2,385,000
- Number of Payouts: 398
- Winning Hand: Q♠ 6♦

Final Table
Place	Name	Prize
1st	Michael Blake (1/1)	$359,863
2nd	Barry Shulman (0/2)	$222,295
3rd	Cary Marshall	$162,536
4th	Timothy Joseph	$119,888
5th	Rick Austin	$89,217
6th	Kanajett Hathaitham	$66,987
7th	Jeffrey Miller	$50,751
8th	Bruce Treitman	$38,802
9th	Miles Harris	$29,939

=== Event #40: $1,500 Pot Limit Omaha ===
- 3-Day Event: June 17-19
- Number of Entries: 1,216
- Total Prize Pool: $1,641,600
- Number of Payouts: 183
- Winning Hand: K♠ 6♠ 5♦ 3♣

Final Table
Place	Name	Prize
1st	Ismael Bojang (1/1)	$298,507
2nd	James Little	$184,424
3rd	Benjamin Zamani (0/2)	$131,335
4th	Johannes Toebbe	$94,669
5th	Denis Bagdasarov	$69,082
6th	Mihai Niste	$51,041
7th	Richard Tuhrim	$38,189
8th	Glen Cressman	$28,940
9th	Matthew Mueller	$22,215

=== Event #41: $10,000 Seven Card Stud ===
- 4-Day Event: June 17-20
- Number of Entries: 88
- Total Prize Pool: $827,200
- Number of Payouts: 14
- Winning Hand: A♦ 7♦ 9♠ J♥ 7♣ A♠ 2♦

Final Table
Place	Name	Prize
1st	John Hennigan* (1/6)	$245,451
2nd	Daniel Negreanu* (0/6)	$151,700
3rd	David "ODB" Baker (0/1)	$104,416
4th	Mikhail Semin	$73,810
5th	David Singer (0/2)	$53,621
6th	Chris Tryba (0/1)	$40,066
7th	Frank Kassela (0/3)	$30,817
8th	Frankie O'Dell (0/3)	$24,419

=== Event #42: $600 Mixed No Limit Hold'em/Pot Limit Omaha Deepstack 8-Handed ===
- 2-Day Event: June 18-19
- Number of Entries: 2,403
- Total Prize Pool: $1,261,575
- Number of Payouts: 361
- Winning Hand: A♠ 9♦ 4♣ 4♦

Final Table
Place	Name	Prize
1st	Aristeidis Moschonas (1/1)	$194,759
2nd	Dan Matsuzuki (0/1)	$120,374
3rd	Raghav Bansal	$88,410
4th	Rainer Kempe	$65,482
5th	Ashish Ahuja	$48,914
6th	Stephen Ma	$36,852
7th	Adam Lamphere	$28,006
8th	Daniel Moravec	$21,469

=== Event #43: $2,500 Mixed Big Bet ===
- 3-Day Event: June 18-20
- Number of Entries: 218
- Total Prize Pool: $490,500
- Number of Payouts: 33
- Winning Hand: K♣ J♣ 9♣ 6♥
- Note: Klein became the third player, and first since 1979, to win bracelets in four straight years

Final Table
Place	Name	Prize
1st	Loren Klein (1/4)	$127,808
2nd	Ryan Hughes (0/2)	$78,985
3rd	Phil Hui (0/1)	$51,346
4th	Arthur Morris	$34,328
5th	Joseph Couden (0/1)	$23,622
6th	Jonathan Depa	$16,746

=== Event #44: $1,500 No Limit Hold'em Bounty ===
- 3-Day Event: June 19-21
- Number of Entries: 1,807
- Total Prize Pool: $2,439,450
- Number of Payouts: 272
- Winning Hand: 4♠ 3♠

Final Table
Place	Name	Prize
1st	Asi Moshe (1/3)	$253,933
2nd	Damjan Radanov	$156,875
3rd	Tonio Roder	$113,360
4th	Patrick Truong	$82,764
5th	Vitalijs Zavorotnijs	$61,058
6th	Andrew Hills	$45,521
7th	Timothy Stephens	$34,300
8th	Harrison Gimbel (0/1)	$26,125
9th	Bastian Fischer	$20,115

=== Event #45: $25,000 Pot Limit Omaha High Roller ===
- 4-Day Event: June 19-22
- Number of Entries: 278
- Total Prize Pool: $6,602,500
- Number of Payouts: 42
- Winning Hand: K♣ Q♦ 7♦ 6♠

Final Table
Place	Name	Prize
1st	Stephen Chidwick (1/1)	$1,618,417
2nd	James Chen	$1,000,253
3rd	Matthew Gonzales	$699,364
4th	Robert Mizrachi (0/4)	$497,112
5th	Alex Epstein (1/1)	$359,320
6th	Erik Seidel* (0/8)	$264,186
7th	Wasim Korkis	$197,637
8th	Ka Kwan Lau	$150,483

=== Event #46: $500 WSOP.com Online No Limit Hold'em Turbo Deepstack ===
- 1-Day Event: June 19
- Number of Entries: 1,767
- Total Prize Pool: $795,180
- Number of Payouts: 180
- Winning Hand: A♣ 3♣

Final Table
Place	Name	Prize
1st	Dan Lupo (1/1)	$145,274
2nd	David Clarke	$89,693
3rd	Chris Johnson	$63,771
4th	Jared Strauss	$45,960
5th	Fred Li	$33,475
6th	Kutay Kalkan	$24,729
7th	Jimmy Perez	$18,527
8th	Stephen Graner	$13,995
9th	Aleksandr Shevelev	$10,735

=== Event #47: $1,000/$10,000 Ladies No Limit Hold'em ===
- 4-Day Event: June 20-23
- Number of Entries: 968
- Total Prize Pool: $871,200
- Number of Payouts: 146
- Winning Hand: A♠ 9♥

Final Table
Place	Name	Prize
1st	Jiyoung Kim (1/1)	$167,308
2nd	Nancy Matson	$103,350
3rd	Sandrine Phan	$72,821
4th	Stephanie Dao	$52,007
5th	Lyly Vo	$37,654
6th	Lexy Gavin	$27,643
7th	Raylene Celaya	$20,582
8th	Stephanie Hubbard	$15,544
9th	Barbara Blechinger	$11,911

=== Event #48: $2,500 No Limit Hold'em ===
- 3-Day Event: June 20-22
- Number of Entries: 996
- Total Prize Pool: $2,241,000
- Number of Payouts: 150
- Winning Hand: 7♦ 6♣

Final Table
Place	Name	Prize
1st	Ari Engel (1/1)	$427,399
2nd	Pablo Melogno	$264,104
3rd	Wilbern Hoffman	$186,392
4th	Ben Keeline (0/1)	$133,306
5th	David "Bakes" Baker (0/2)	$96,632
6th	James Hughes	$71,010
7th	Truyen Nguyen	$52,909
8th	Ryan Olisar	$39,980
9th	Josh Arieh (0/2)	$30,643

=== Event #49: $10,000 Limit 2-7 Lowball Triple Draw ===
- 3-Day Event: June 20-22
- Number of Entries: 100
- Total Prize Pool: $940,000
- Number of Payouts: 15
- Winning Hand: 8♣ 7♦ 6♦ 4♠ 2♦

Final Table
Place	Name	Prize
1st	Luke Schwartz (1/1)	$273,336
2nd	George Wolff	$168,936
3rd	Johannes Becker (0/1)	$116,236
4th	Mark Gregorich	$81,635
5th	Yueqi Zhu (0/1)	$58,547
6th	Calvin Anderson (0/2)	$42,898

=== Event #50: $1,500 Monster Stack No Limit Hold'em ===
- 6-Day Event: June 21-26
- Number of Entries: 6,035
- Total Prize Pool: $8,147,250
- Number of Payouts: 906
- Winning Hand: K♣ 6♣

Final Table
Place	Name	Prize
1st	Kainalu McCue-Unciano (1/1)	$1,008,850
2nd	Vincent Chauve	$623,211
3rd	Gregory Katayama	$461,369
4th	Bart Hanson	$344,079
5th	Benjamin Ector	$258,516
6th	Igor Yaroshevskyy	$195,687
7th	Bryan Kim	$149,247
8th	Andre Haneberg	$114,694
9th	Javier Zarco	$88,817

=== Event #51: $2,500 Mixed Omaha/Seven Card Stud Hi/Lo 8 or Better ===
- 3-Day Event: June 21-23
- Number of Entries: 401
- Total Prize Pool: $902,250
- Number of Payouts: 61
- Winning Hand: K♠ Q♠ J♠ 10♦

Final Table
Place	Name	Prize
1st	Yuri Dzivielevski (1/1)	$213,750
2nd	Michael Thompson	$132,113
3rd	Denis Strebkov	$89,744
4th	Andrey Zaichenko (0/1)	$62,176
5th	Daniel Zack (1/1)	$43,950
6th	Philip Long (0/1)	$31,710
7th	Alex Livingston	$23,362
8th	Daniel Ratigan	$17,584

=== Event #52: $10,000 Pot Limit Omaha 8-Handed ===
- 4-Day Event: June 22-25
- Number of Entries: 518
- Total Prize Pool: $4,869,200
- Number of Payouts: 78
- Winning Hand: K♥ Q♥ Q♣ 10♠

Final Table
Place	Name	Prize
1st	Dash Dudley (1/1)	$1,086,967
2nd	James Park	$671,802
3rd	Joel Feldman	$463,814
4th	Jeremy Ausmus (0/1)	$325,693
5th	Kyle Montgomery	$232,680
6th	Eoghan O'Dea	$169,173
7th	Andrey Razov	$125,215
8th	Will Jaffe (0/1)	$94,380

=== Event #53: $800 No Limit Hold'em Deepstack 8-Handed ===
- 3-Day Event: June 23-25
- Number of Entries: 3,759
- Total Prize Pool: $2,676,408
- Number of Payouts: 564
- Winning Hand: J♣ 10♥

Final Table
Place	Name	Prize
1st	Santiago Soriano (1/1)	$371,203
2nd	Amir Lehavot (0/1)	$229,410
3rd	Benjamin Underwood	$168,960
4th	Nick Blackburn	$125,432
5th	Joao Valli	$93,866
6th	Samuel Gagnon	$70,813
7th	Daniele D’Angelo	$53,858
8th	Ori Hasson	$41,300

=== Event #54: $1,500 Razz ===
- 4-Day Event: June 23-26
- Number of Entries: 363
- Total Prize Pool: $490,050
- Number of Payouts: 55
- Winning Hand: 6♦ 5♣ 3♦ 2♥ A♥

Final Table
Place	Name	Prize
1st	Kevin Gerhart (1/1)	$119,054
2nd	Sergio Braga	$73,577
3rd	Joseph Hoffman	$49,762
4th	Andres Korn (0/1)	$34,352
5th	Jean Said	$24,216
6th	Scott Clements (1/3)	$17,440
7th	Robert Campbell (1/1)	$12,837
8th	Grzegorz Wyraz	$9,663

=== Event #55: $1,000 WSOP.com Online No Limit Hold'em Double Stack ===
- 1-Day Event: June 23
- Number of Entries: 1,333
- Total Prize Pool: $1,266,350
- Number of Payouts: 153
- Winning Hand: 9♥ 4♥

Final Table
Place	Name	Prize
1st	Jason Gooch (1/1)	$241,493
2nd	Brian Wood	$148,543
3rd	Anthony Augustino	$104,980
4th	Dario Sammartino	$75,095
5th	Timothy Wong	$54,453
6th	Ran Koller	$40,143
7th	Gianluca Speranza	$29,886
8th	Justin Liberto (0/1)	$22,541
9th	Max Pescatori (0/4)	$17,349

=== Event #56: $1,500 No Limit Hold'em Super Turbo Bounty ===
- 1-Day Event: June 24
- Number of Entries: 1,867
- Total Prize Pool: $2,520,450
- Number of Payouts: 281
- Winning Hand: 10♣ 6♣

Final Table
Place	Name	Prize
1st	Jonas Lauck (1/1)	$260,335
2nd	Robert Bickley	$160,820
3rd	Fernando Viana	$116,426
4th	Markus Gonsalves	$85,141
5th	Anil Jivani	$62,901
6th	Aaron Pinson	$46,951
7th	Arron Woodcock	$35,412
8th	Aaron Johnson	$26,992
9th	Edward Courage	$20,793

=== Event #57: $1,000 Tag Team No Limit Hold'em ===
- 4-Day Event: June 24-27
- Number of Entries: 976
- Total Prize Pool: $878,400
- Number of Payouts: 147
- Winning Hand: J♣ 10♣

Final Table
Place	Name	Prize
1st	Daniel Dayan (1/1); Ohad Geiger (1/1); Barak Wisbrod (1/1)	$168,395
2nd	Lawrence Chan; Matthew Moreno; Jerod Smith	$104,025
3rd	John Hinds; Anthony Zinno (0/1)	$73,329
4th	Zachary Gruneberg; Timothy Jurkiewicz	$52,390
5th	Fabio Coppola; Richard Washinsky	$37,944
6th	Chahn Jung; Aaron Motoyama; Steve Sung (0/2); Danny Wong	$27,864
7th	Daniel Marder; Michael Marder; Paul Steinberg	$20,750
8th	Kenny Hallaert; Steven van Zadelhoff	$15,674
9th	Shaotong Chang; Jie Xu	$12,011

=== Event #58: $50,000 Poker Players Championship ===
- 5-Day Event: June 24-28
- Number of Entries: 74
- Total Prize Pool: $3,552,000
- Number of Payouts: 12
- Winning Hand: 9♥ 5♣ 4♠ 3♠ 2♠ (2-7 Triple Draw)

Final Table
Place	Name	Prize
1st	Phil Hui (1/2)	$1,099,311
2nd	Josh Arieh (0/2)	$679,426
3rd	John Esposito (0/1)	$466,407
4th	Bryce Yockey (0/1)	$325,989
5th	Shaun Deeb (0/4)	$232,058
6th	Dan Cates	$168,305

=== Event #59: $600 No Limit Hold'em Deepstack Championship ===
- 4-Day Event: June 25-28
- Number of Entries: 6,140
- Total Prize Pool: $3,223,500
- Number of Payouts: 921
- Winning Hand: 4♠ 4♣

Final Table
Place	Name	Prize
1st	Joe Foresman (1/1)	$397,903
2nd	Will Givens (0/1)	$245,606
3rd	Steffen Logen	$181,953
4th	Jeff Hakim	$135,783
5th	Gleb Kovtunov	$102,077
6th	Mrityunjay Jha	$77,308
7th	David Goodman	$58,988
8th	Jean-Francois Alexandre	$45,348
9th	Linda Huard	$35,128

=== Event #60: $1,500 Pot Limit Omaha Hi/Lo 8 or Better ===
- 4-Day Event: June 25-28
- Number of Entries: 1,117
- Total Prize Pool: $1,507,950
- Number of Payouts: 168
- Winning Hand: 10♥ 7♦ 6♣ 4♥

Final Table
Place	Name	Prize
1st	Anthony Zinno (1/2)	$279,920
2nd	Rodney Burt	$172,932
3rd	Thomas Schropfer	$122,555
4th	Jon Turner	$87,967
5th	Scott Abrams	$63,961
6th	Jordan Spurlin	$47,118
7th	Connor Drinan	$35,173
8th	Kyle Miaso	$26,611
9th	Erik Seidel* (0/8)	$20,410

=== Event #61: $400 Colossus No Limit Hold'em ===
- 4-Day Event: June 26-29
- Number of Entries: 13,109
- Total Prize Pool: $4,382,515
- Number of Payouts: 1,952
- Winning Hand: K♦ 2♣

Final Table
Place	Name	Prize
1st	Sejin Park (1/1)	$451,272
2nd	Georgios Kapalas	$278,881
3rd	Ryan DePaulo	$208,643
4th	Juan Lopez	$157,106
5th	Andrew Barber (0/1)	$119,072
6th	Norson Saho	$90,838
7th	Patrick Miller	$69,757
8th	Maksim Kalman	$53,925
9th	Diego Lima	$41,965

=== Event #62: $10,000 Razz ===
- 4-Day Event: June 26-29
- Number of Entries: 116
- Total Prize Pool: $1,090,400
- Number of Payouts: 18
- Winning Hand: A♥ 2♠ 5♦ 8♥ 10♥ K♥ 2♦

Final Table
Place	Name	Prize
1st	Scott Seiver (1/3)	$301,421
2nd	Andrey Zhigalov (0/1)	$186,293
3rd	Chris Ferguson (0/6)	$131,194
4th	Daniel Zack (1/1)	$94,305
5th	Daniel Negreanu* (0/6)	$69,223
6th	André Akkari (0/1)	$51,911
7th	David Bach (0/3)	$39,788
8th	George Alexander	$31,185

=== Event #63: $1,500 Omaha Mix ===
- 4-Day Event: June 27-30
- Number of Entries: 717
- Total Prize Pool: $967,950
- Number of Payouts: 108
- Winning Hand: Q♣ 9♠ 4♦ 3♠

Final Table
Place	Name	Prize
1st	Anatolii Zyrin (1/1)	$199,838
2nd	Yueqi Zhu (0/1)	$123,466
3rd	James Van Alstyne (0/1)	$84,106
4th	Mesbah Guerfi	$58,289
5th	Aron Dermer	$41,112
6th	Iori Yogo	$29,518
7th	Alan Sternberg	$21,582
8th	Ivo Donev (0/1)	$16,075

=== Event #64: $888 Crazy Eights No Limit Hold'em ===
- 6-Day Event: June 28-July 3
- Number of Entries: 10,185
- Total Prize Pool: $7,720,210
- Number of Payouts: 1,496
- Winning Hand: A♦ 4♦

Final Table
Place	Name	Prize
1st	Rick Alvarado (1/1)	$888,888
2nd	Mark Radoja (0/2)	$548,888
3rd	Thomas Drivas	$409,888
4th	Vivian Saliba	$308,888
5th	Aleksandras Rusinovas	$233,888
6th	Patrick Clarke	$177,888
7th	Vlad Darie	$136,888
8th	Mario Hofler	$105,888

=== Event #65: $10,000 Pot Limit Omaha Hi-Lo 8 or Better ===
- 4-Day Event: June 28-July 1
- Number of Entries: 193
- Total Prize Pool: $1,814,200
- Number of Payouts: 29
- Winning Hand: A♣ 10♣ 5♣ 4♥

Final Table
Place	Name	Prize
1st	Nick Schulman (1/3)	$463,670
2nd	Brian Hastings (0/4)	$286,570
3rd	Joe Hachem (0/1)	$201,041
4th	Denis Strebkov	$143,700
5th	Christopher Vitch (0/2)	$104,688
6th	Corey Hochman	$77,763
7th	Michael McKenna	$58,918
8th	Bryce Yockey (0/1)	$45,551

=== Event #66: $1,500 Limit Hold'em ===
- 3-Day Event: June 29-July 1
- Number of Entries: 541
- Total Prize Pool: $730,350
- Number of Payouts: 82
- Winning Hand: J♥ J♦

Final Table
Place	Name	Prize
1st	David "ODB" Baker (1/2)	$161,139
2nd	Brian Kim	$99,564
3rd	Dominzo Love	$68,353
4th	Ruiko Mamiya	$47,747
5th	Chris Ferguson (0/6)	$33,948
6th	Chicong Nguyen	$24,574
7th	Kenneth Donoghue	$18,118
8th	Danny Woolard	$13,609
9th	Greg Mueller (1/3)	$10,418

=== Event #67: $10,000 Seven Card Stud Hi-Lo 8 or Better ===
- 3-Day Event: June 30-July 2
- Number of Entries: 151
- Total Prize Pool: $1,419,400
- Number of Payouts: 23
- Winning Hand: A♥ 10♣ A♣ Q♦ J♥ 8♠ 9♥

Final Table
Place	Name	Prize
1st	Robert Campbell (2/2)	$385,763
2nd	Yueqi Zhu (0/1)	$238,420
3rd	Mike Wattel (0/2)	$164,647
4th	Mike Matusow (0/4)	$116,255
5th	Ryan Hughes (0/2)	$83,971
6th	Qinghai Pan	$62,079
7th	Andrey Zhigalov (0/1)	$46,999
8th	Steven Wolansky (0/2)	$36,460

=== Event #68: $1,000 WSOP.com Online No Limit Hold'em Championship ===
- 1-Day Event: June 30
- Number of Entries: 1,750
- Total Prize Pool: $1,662,500
- Number of Payouts: 180
- Winning Hand: Q♣ Q♥

Final Table
Place	Name	Prize
1st	Nicholas Baris (1/1)	$303,739
2nd	Tara Cain	$187,530
3rd	William Lamb Harding	$133,333
4th	David "Bakes" Baker (0/2)	$96,093
5th	Jason Lawhun	$69,991
6th	Jack Maskill	$51,704
7th	Chris Ferguson (0/6)	$38,736
8th	Ryan Jones	$29,260
9th	Antonio Guerrero	$22,444

=== Event #69: $1,000 Mini Main Event No Limit Hold'em ===
- 3-Day Event: July 1-3
- Number of Entries: 5,521
- Total Prize Pool: $4,968,900
- Number of Payouts: 829
- Winning Hand: A♣ A♦

Final Table
Place	Name	Prize
1st	Jeremy Saderne (1/1)	$628,654
2nd	Lula Taylor	$388,284
3rd	Andres Korn (0/1)	$287,219
4th	Yi Ma	$214,047
5th	Koji Takagi	$160,715
6th	Stefan Widmer	$121,586
7th	Philip Gildea	$92,686
8th	Ben Alloggio	$71,199
9th	James Stewart	$55,118

=== Event #70: $5,000 No Limit Hold'em 6-Handed ===
- 4-Day Event: July 1-4
- Number of Entries: 815
- Total Prize Pool: $3,789,750
- Number of Payouts: 123
- Winning Hand: A♣ K♦

Final Table
Place	Name	Prize
1st	Joao Vieira (1/1)	$758,011
2nd	Joe Cada (0/4)	$468,488
3rd	Jamie O'Connor	$317,956
4th	Pierre Calamusa	$219,468
5th	Olivier Busquet	$154,112
6th	Barry Hutter (0/1)	$110,127

=== Event #71: $500 Salute to Warriors No Limit Hold'em ===
- 3-Day Event: July 2-5
- Number of Entries: 1,723
- Total Prize Pool: $723,660
- Number of Payouts: 259
- Winning Hand: 5♥ 5♣

Final Table
Place	Name	Prize
1st	Susan Faber (1/1)	$121,161
2nd	Rob Stark	$74,785
3rd	Dean Yoon	$53,887
4th	Chris Canan	$39,248
5th	Taylor Carroll	$28,897
6th	Jordan Knackstedt	$21,510
7th	Jose Annaloro	$16,190
8th	Kulwant Singh	$12,323
9th	Taehyung Kim	$9,486

=== Event #72: $10,000 Limit Hold'em Championship ===
- 3-Day Event: July 2-4
- Number of Entries: 118
- Total Prize Pool: $1,109,200
- Number of Payouts: 18
- Winning Hand: K♦ 6♥

Final Table
Place	Name	Prize
1st	Juha Helppi (1/1)	$306,622
2nd	Mike Lancaster	$189,505
3rd	Tommy Hang (0/1)	$133,718
4th	Anthony Marsico	$96,272
5th	Kevin Song (0/1)	$70,750
6th	Josh Arieh (0/2)	$53,095
7th	Kyle Ray	$40,709
8th	Qinghai Pan	$31,902
9th	Robert Como	$25,566

=== Event #73: $10,000 No Limit Hold'em Main Event ===
- 13-Day Event: July 3-16
- Number of Entries: 8,569
- Total Prize Pool: $80,548,600
- Number of Payouts: 1,286
- Winning Hand: K♥ K♣

Final Table
Place	Name	Prize
1st	Hossein Ensan (1/1)	$10,000,000
2nd	Dario Sammartino	$6,000,000
3rd	Alex Livingston	$4,000,000
4th	Garry Gates	$3,000,000
5th	Kevin Maahs	$2,200,000
6th	Zhen Cai	$1,850,000
7th	Nick Marchington	$1,525,000
8th	Timothy Su	$1,250,000
9th	Milos Skrbic	$1,000,000

=== Event #74: $3,200 WSOP.com Online No Limit Hold'em High Roller ===
- 1-Day Event: July 3
- Number of Entries: 593
- Total Prize Pool: $1,802,720
- Number of Payouts: 72
- Winning Hand: Q♣ Q♠

Final Table
Place	Name	Prize
1st	Brandon Adams (1/1)	$411,561
2nd	Nabil Cardoso	$253,643
3rd	Vladimir Alexandrov	$173,241
4th	Calvin Anderson (0/2)	$120,422
5th	Michael Vanier	$85,449
6th	Norbert Szecsi (0/2)	$61,653
7th	Lior Orel	$45,429
8th	Harsukhpaul Sangha	$34,071

=== Event #75: $1,000 + $111 Little One for One Drop No Limit Hold'em ===
- 7-Day Event: July 6-12
- Number of Entries: 6,248
- Total Prize Pool: $5,623,200
- Number of Payouts: 937
- Winning Hand: K♣ 5♣

Final Table
Place	Name	Prize
1st	James Anderson (1/1)	$690,686
2nd	Fernando Karam	$426,543
3rd	Marco Guibert	$316,233
4th	Liran Betito	$236,151
5th	Shalom Elharar	$177,639
6th	Nils Tolpingrud	$134,608
7th	Mark Strodl	$102,757
8th	Ying Fu	$79,029
9th	Robert Mather	$61,238

=== Event #76: $800 WSOP.com Online No Limit Hold'em 6-Handed ===
- 1-Day Event: July 7
- Number of Entries: 1,560
- Total Prize Pool: $1,170,000
- Number of Payouts: 153
- Winning Hand: J♥ J♦

Final Table
Place	Name	Prize
1st	Shawn Buchanan (1/1)	$223,119
2nd	David "Bakes" Baker (0/2)	$137,241
3rd	Hunter Gebron	$96,993
4th	Alexandre Moreira	$69,381
5th	Luigi Shehadeh	$50,310
6th	Jeremy Brown	$37,089

=== Event #77: $3,000 Limit Hold'em 6-Handed ===
- 4-Day Event: July 8-11
- Number of Entries: 193
- Total Prize Pool: $521,100
- Number of Payouts: 29
- Winning Hand: K♣ 9♥

Final Table
Place	Name	Prize
1st	Stephanie Dao (1/1)	$133,189
2nd	Alain Alinat	$82,312
3rd	Ian O'Hara	$55,749
4th	Chad Eveslage	$38,561
5th	Jan Suchanek	$27,251
6th	Oleg Chebotarev	$19,687

=== Event #90: $50,000 Final Fifty High Roller No Limit Hold'em ===
- 3-Day Event: July 8-10
- Number of Entries: 123
- Total Prize Pool: $5,904,000
- Number of Payouts: 19
- Winning Hand: A♥ J♥
- Note: This was a late addition to the WSOP schedule

Final Table
Place	Name	Prize
1st	Danny Tang (1/1)	$1,608,406
2nd	Sam Soverel (0/1)	$994,072
3rd	Michael Addamo (0/2)	$697,375
4th	Brandon Adams (1/1)	$500,282
5th	Adrian Mateos (0/3)	$367,186
6th	Keith Tilston	$275,874
7th	Ali Imsirovic	$212,292
8th	Seth Davies	$167,420

=== Event #78: $1,500 Pot Limit Omaha Bounty ===
- 4-Day Event: July 9-12
- Number of Entries: 1,130
- Total Prize Pool: $1,525,500
- Number of Payouts: 170
- Winning Hand: A♠ J♣ 10♦ 4♣

Final Table
Place	Name	Prize
1st	Maximilian Klostermeier (1/1)	$177,823
2nd	David Callaghan	$109,844
3rd	Bryce Yockey (0/1)	$77,893
4th	Ryan Lenaghan	$55,939
5th	Jason Stockfish	$40,691
6th	Tim Seidensticker	$29,987
7th	Scott Sharpe	$22,391
8th	Heng Zhang	$16,944
9th	Joseph Liberta	$12,996

=== Event #79: $3,000 No Limit Hold'em ===
- 4-Day Event: July 9-12
- Number of Entries: 671
- Total Prize Pool: $1,811,700
- Number of Payouts: 101
- Winning Hand: K♥ K♦

Final Table
Place	Name	Prize
1st	Ivan Deyra (1/1)	$380,090
2nd	David Gonzalez	$234,882
3rd	Guillaume Nolet	$162,575
4th	Patrick Leonard	$114,347
5th	David DiBernardi	$81,749
6th	David Weinstein	$59,421
7th	Andras Nemeth	$43,925
8th	Dennis Brand	$33,032
9th	Diego Zeiter	$25,278

=== Event #80: $1,500 Mixed No Limit Hold'em/Pot Limit Omaha ===
- 4-Day Event: July 10-13
- Number of Entries: 1,250
- Total Prize Pool: $1,687,500
- Number of Payouts: 188
- Winning Hand: J♥ J♦

Final Table
Place	Name	Prize
1st	Jerry Odeen (1/1)	$304,793
2nd	Peter Linton	$188,368
3rd	Adam Demersseman	$135,093
4th	Lucas Greenwood	$98,027
5th	Ayaz Mahmood (0/1)	$71,979
6th	Eddie Blumenthal	$53,490
7th	Jeremy Kottler	$40,236
8th	Gary Bolden	$30,640

=== Event #81: $1,500 50th Annual Bracelet Winners Only No Limit Hold'em ===
- 3-Day Event: July 10-12
- Number of Entries: 185
- Total Prize Pool: $277,500
- Number of Payouts: 28
- Winning Hand: 3♠ 2♠

Final Table
Place	Name	Prize
1st	Shankar Pillai (1/2)	$71,580
2nd	Michael Gagliano (0/1)	$44,232
3rd	Tommy Nguyen (0/1)	$31,176
4th	Brett Apter (1/1)	$22,349
5th	Kevin Gerhart (1/1)	$16,299
6th	Andreas Klatt (0/1)	$12,097
7th	Thom Werthmann (0/1)	$9,140
8th	Scott Bohlman (0/1)	$7,032
9th	Haixia Zhang (0/1)	$5,512

=== Event #82: $1,500 No Limit Hold'em Double Stack ===
- 3-Day Event: July 11-14
- Number of Entries: 2,589
- Total Prize Pool: $3,495,150
- Number of Payouts: 389
- Winning Hand: A♠ A♣

Final Table
Place	Name	Prize
1st	Tom Koral (1/2)	$530,164
2nd	Freek Scholten	$327,563
3rd	Barry Shulman (0/2)	$239,187
4th	Philip Scaletta	$176,219
5th	Adam Hendrix	$131,001
6th	Darren Rabinowitz	$98,274
7th	Kunal Punjwani	$74,401
8th	Kalyan Cheekuri	$56,850
9th	Pablo Fernandez	$43,847

=== Event #83: $100,000 No Limit Hold'em High Roller ===
- 3-Day Event: July 11-13
- Number of Entries: 99
- Total Prize Pool: $9,603,000
- Number of Payouts: 15
- Winning Hand: Q♣ J♦

Final Table
Place	Name	Prize
1st	Keith Tilston (1/1)	$2,792,406
2nd	Daniel Negreanu* (0/6)	$1,725,838
3rd	Nick Schulman (1/3)	$1,187,802
4th	Igor Kurganov (0/1)	$840,183
5th	Brandon Adams (1/1)	$611,258
6th	Dominik Nitsche (0/4)	$457,772
7th	Sergi Reixach	$353,202
8th	Christoph Vogelsang	$281,025

=== Event #84: $1,500 The Closer No Limit Hold'em ===
- 4-Day Event: July 12-15
- Number of Entries: 2,800
- Total Prize Pool: $3,780,000
- Number of Payouts: 393
- Winning Hand: Q♠ 10♠

Final Table
Place	Name	Prize
1st	Abhinav Iyer (1/1)	$565,346
2nd	Sammy Lafleur	$349,417
3rd	Sergio Aguilar	$256,298
4th	Carlos Chang	$189,584
5th	Patrick Eskandar	$141,432
6th	Adam Johnson	$106,418
7th	Shaun Deeb (0/4)	$80,766
8th	Steve Yea	$61,834
9th	Jason Reels	$47,758

=== Event #85: $3,000 Pot Limit Omaha 6-Handed ===
- 4-Day Event: July 12-15
- Number of Entries: 835
- Total Prize Pool: $2,254,500
- Number of Payouts: 126
- Winning Hand: K♦ Q♠ 3♠ 2♥

Final Table
Place	Name	Prize
1st	Alan Sternberg (1/1)	$448,392
2nd	Evangelos Kokkalis	$277,087
3rd	John Richards	$187,670
4th	Millard Hale	$129,313
5th	Ka Kwan Lau	$90,674
6th	Joseph Cheong (1/1)	$64,722

=== Event #86: $10,000 No Limit Hold'em 6-Handed ===
- 4-Day Event: July 13-16
- Number of Entries: 272
- Total Prize Pool: $2,556,800
- Number of Payouts: 41
- Winning Hand: A♦ K♦

Final Table
Place	Name	Prize
1st	Anuj Agarwal (1/1)	$630,747
2nd	Kahle Burns	$389,832
3rd	Gal Yifrach (0/1)	$257,533
4th	Leonard Maue	$174,252
5th	Dong Chen	$120,828
6th	Ben Heath (1/1)	$85,915

=== Event #87: $3,000 H.O.R.S.E. ===
- 3-Day Event: July 14-16
- Number of Entries: 301
- Total Prize Pool: $812,700
- Number of Payouts: 46
- Winning Hand: 5♥ 4♥ (Hold'em)

Final Table
Place	Name	Prize
1st	Denis Strebkov (1/1)	$206,173
2nd	Paul Tedeschi	$127,419
3rd	Nick Guagenti	$85,265
4th	Brian Hastings (0/4)	$58,359
5th	Andrey Zaichenko (0/1)	$40,876
6th	Konstantin Puchkov (0/1)	$29,316
7th	Jim Collopy (0/1)	$21,540
8th	Paul Volpe (0/3)	$16,224

=== Event #88: $500 WSOP.com Online No Limit Hold'em Summer Saver ===
- 1-Day Event: July 14
- Number of Entries: 1,859
- Total Prize Pool: $836,550
- Number of Payouts: 207
- Winning Hand: 2♦ 2♠

Final Table
Place	Name	Prize
1st	Taylor Paur (1/2)	$149,241
2nd	Francois Evard	$91,268
3rd	Satish Surapaneni	$65,251
4th	Brock Parker (0/3)	$47,181
5th	Jason James	$34,550
6th	David Liebman	$25,598
7th	Joseph Hanrahan	$19,241
8th	Timothy Rutherford	$14,556
9th	Brian Mancilla	$11,210

=== Event #89: $5,000 No Limit Hold'em ===
- 2-Day Event: July 15-16
- Number of Entries: 608
- Total Prize Pool: $2,827,200
- Number of Payouts: 92
- Winning Hand: Q♠ 7♠

Final Table
Place	Name	Prize
1st	Carl Shaw (1/1)	$606,562
2nd	Tony Dunst (0/1)	$374,886
3rd	Luke Graham	$259,533
4th	Jordan Cristos	$182,575
5th	Lars Kamphues	$130,544
6th	Phil Hellmuth* (0/15)	$94,899
7th	Rami Mornel	$70,156
8th	Caufman Talley	$52,760
9th	Kevin Eyster (0/1)	$40,374
