= 2019 World Series of Poker Europe results =

Below are the results of the 2019 World Series of Poker Europe, held from October 13-November 4 at King's Casino in Rozvadov, Czech Republic. There are 15 scheduled bracelet events.

== Key ==
*	Elected to the Poker Hall of Fame
(#/#)	This denotes a bracelet winner. The first number is the number of bracelets won in the 2019 WSOP. The second number is the total number of bracelets won. Both numbers represent totals as of that point during the tournament.
Place	What place each player at the final table finished
Name	The player who made it to the final table
Prize (US$)	The amount of money awarded for each finish at the event's final table

== Results ==
=== Event #1: €350 Opener No Limit Hold'em ===
- 3-Day Event: October 13-15
- Number of Entries: 1,011
- Total Prize Pool: €302,541
- Number of Payouts: 152
- Winning Hand: A♦ 9♠

Final Table
Place	Name	Prize
1st	Renat Bohdanov (1/1)	€53,654
2nd	Norbert Mosonyi	€33,112
3rd	Eyal Bensimhon	€23,386
4th	Mykhailo Hryhoriev	€16,736
5th	Samuel Mika	€12,138
6th	Michal Kral	€8,923
7th	Rafi Elharar	€6,651
8th	Jeff Lisandro (0/6)	€5,026
9th	Ricardas Vymeris	€3,853

=== Event #2: €550 Pot Limit Omaha ===
- 3-Day Event: October 14-16
- Number of Entries: 476
- Total Prize Pool: €226,100
- Number of Payouts: 71
- Winning Hand: Q♠ J♥ 9♥ 8♣

Final Table
Place	Name	Prize
1st	Dash Dudley (2/2)	€51,600
2nd	Christopher Back	€31,825
3rd	Denis Drobina	€21,825
4th	Paul Teoh	€15,225
5th	Ivo Donev (0/1)	€10,900
6th	Oshri Lahmani	€7,850
7th	Anson Tsang (0/1)	€5,800
8th	Naor Slobodskoy	€4,365

=== Event #3: €1,350 Mini Main Event No Limit Hold'em ===
- 3-Day Event: October 16-18
- Number of Entries: 766
- Total Prize Pool: €873,240
- Number of Payouts: 115
- Winning Hand: K♠ Q♦

Final Table
Place	Name	Prize
1st	Vangelis Kaimakamis (1/1)	€167,056
2nd	Shahar Levi	€103,216
3rd	Jose Rivas	€72,474
4th	Markus Jordan	€51,628
5th	Didier Rabl	€37,321
6th	Andrew Bak	€27,382
7th	Luigi Macaluso	€20,396
8th	Leonid Yanovski	€15,426
9th	Gerardo Giammugnani	€11,850

=== Event #4: €250,000 Super High Roller No Limit Hold'em ===
- 3-Day Event: October 16-18
- Number of Entries: 30
- Total Prize Pool: €7,125,000
- Number of Payouts: 5
- Winning Hand: A♦ 4♦

Final Table
Place	Name	Prize
1st	James Chen (1/1)	€2,844,215
2nd	Chin Wei Lim	€1,757,857
3rd	Christoph Vogelsang	€1,185,161
4th	Tony G	€799,045
5th	Cary Katz	€538,722

=== Event #5: €2,500 8-Game Mix ===
- 2-Day Event: October 17-18
- Number of Entries: 71
- Total Prize Pool: €237,500
- Number of Payouts: 11
- Winning Hand: Q-J-10-5-4 (2-7 Triple Draw)

Final Table
Place	Name	Prize
1st	Espen Sandvik (1/1)	€75,426
2nd	Ville Haavisto	€46,613
3rd	Phil Hellmuth* (0/15)	€31,058
4th	Jeff Madsen (0/4)	€21,386
5th	Thomer Pidun	€15,235
6th	Jochen Kaiser	€11,242

=== Event #6: €25,500 Short Deck High Roller No Limit Hold'em ===
- 2-Day Event: October 18-19
- Number of Entries: 111
- Total Prize Pool: €2,636,250
- Number of Payouts: 17
- Winning Hand: A♥ K♣

Final Table
Place	Name	Prize
1st	Siamak Tooran (1/1)	€740,996
2nd	Thai Ha	€457,964
3rd	Orpen Kisacikoglu	€323,553
4th	Netanel Amedi	€230,807
5th	Besim Hot	€166,258
6th	Rob Yong	€118,653

=== Event #7: €1,100 Turbo Bounty Hunter No Limit Hold'em ===
- 1-Day Event: October 19
- Number of Entries: 377
- Total Prize Pool: €348,631
- Number of Payouts: 57
- Winning Hand: K♥ Q♠

Final Table
Place	Name	Prize
1st	Tomas Fara (1/1)	€59,904
2nd	Nisad Muratovic	€37,004
3rd	Manig Löser	€24,949
4th	David Elyashar	€17,172
5th	Anson Tsang (0/1)	€12,071
6th	Arturs Scerbaks	€8,670
7th	Phil Hui (0/2)	€6,366
8th	Julian Selinger	€4,781
9th	Giorgiy Skhulukhiya	€3,674

=== Event #8: €25,500 Platinum High Roller No Limit Hold'em ===
- 3-Day Event: October 20-22
- Number of Entries: 83
- Total Prize Pool: €1,971,250
- Number of Payouts: 13
- Winning Hand: K♠ 4♦

Final Table
Place	Name	Prize
1st	Kahle Burns (1/1)	€596,883
2nd	Sam Trickett	€368,889
3rd	Hossein Ensan (1/1)	€251,837
4th	Abdelhakim Zoufri	€177,062
5th	Timothy Adams (0/1)	€128,326
6th	Alex Foxen	€95,962
7th	Anton Morgenstern	€74,117
8th	Robert Campbell (2/2)	€59,189

=== Event #9: €1,650 Pot Limit Omaha/No Limit Hold'em Mix ===
- 2-Day Event: October 20-21
- Number of Entries: 279
- Total Prize Pool: €397,575
- Number of Payouts: 42
- Winning Hand: J♣ 10♦

Final Table
Place	Name	Prize
1st	Asi Moshe (2/4)	€97,465
2nd	Kristoffer Rasmussen	€60,230
3rd	Harout Ghazarian	€41,754
4th	William Chattaway	€29,480
5th	Jakob Madsen	€21,206
6th	Erik Cajelais (0/1)	€15,548
7th	Dragos Trofimov	€11,622
8th	Quan Zhou	€8,861

=== Event #10: €25,500 Mixed Games Championship ===
- 3-Day Event: October 21-23
- Number of Entries: 45
- Total Prize Pool: €1,068,750
- Number of Payouts: 7
- Winning Hand: Q♣ J♠ 9♠ 7♥ (Pot Limit Omaha)

Final Table
Place	Name	Prize
1st	Besim Hot (1/1)	€385,911
2nd	Phil Hellmuth* (0/15)	€238,509
3rd	Dzmitry Urbanovich	€162,463
4th	Benny Glaser (0/3)	€111,689
5th	Julien Martini (0/1)	€77,502
6th	Daniel Negreanu* (0/6)	€54,287

=== Event #11: €2,200 Pot Limit Omaha ===
- 3-Day Event: October 22-24
- Number of Entries: 271
- Total Prize Pool: €520,049
- Number of Payouts: 41
- Winning Hand: K♣ Q♠ Q♦ 10♠

Final Table
Place	Name	Prize
1st	Tomas Ribeiro (1/1)	€128,314
2nd	Omar Eljach	€79,291
3rd	Marc Palatzky	€54,787
4th	Tobias Peters	€38,581
5th	Ilyaz Dosikov	€27,701
6th	Anson Tsang (0/1)	€20,285
7th	Leonid Yanovski	€15,157
8th	Christopher Frank (0/1)	€11,561

=== Event #12: €100,000 Diamond High Roller No Limit Hold'em ===
- 3-Day Event: October 23-25
- Number of Entries: 72
- Total Prize Pool: €6,840,000
- Number of Payouts: 11
- Winning Hand: 8♠ 4♣

Final Table
Place	Name	Prize
1st	Chin Wei Lim (1/1)	€2,172,104
2nd	Jean-Noël Thorel	€1,342,459
3rd	Anatoly Filatov	€907,301
4th	Christoph Vogelsang	€633,336
5th	Matthias Eibinger	€457,107
6th	Ole Schemion	€341,510
7th	Danny Tang (1/1)	€264,440
8th	Phil Ivey* (0/10)	€212,504

=== Event #13: €2,500 Short Deck No Limit Hold'em ===
- 2-Day Event: October 24-25
- Number of Entries: 179
- Total Prize Pool: €391,115
- Number of Payouts: 27
- Winning Hand: A♥ J♥

Final Table
Place	Name	Prize
1st	Kahle Burns (2/2)	€101,834
2nd	Manig Löser	€62,929
3rd	Felix Schulze	€42,233
4th	Federico Anselmi	€29,027
5th	Vladimir Peck	€20,444
6th	Oshri Lahmani	€14,764

=== Event #14: €10,350 No Limit Hold'em Main Event ===
- 7-Day Event: October 25-31
- Number of Entries: 541
- Total Prize Pool: €5,139,500
- Number of Payouts: 82
- Winning Hand: A♠ K♠

Final Table
Place	Name	Prize
1st	Alexandros Kolonias (1/1)	€1,133,678
2nd	Claas Segebrecht	€700,639
3rd	Anthony Zinno (1/2)	€485,291
4th	Dario Sammartino	€341,702
5th	Anh Do	€244,653
6th	Rifat Palevic (0/1)	€178,171
7th	Julien Martini (0/1)	€132,017
8th	Jakob Madsen	€99,555

=== Event #15: €550 Colossus No Limit Hold'em ===
- 8-Day Event: October 28-November 4
- Number of Entries: 2,738
- Total Prize Pool: €1,300,550
- Number of Payouts: 396
- Winning Hand: 10♠ 10♥

Final Table
Place	Name	Prize
1st	Bertrand Grospellier (1/2)	€191,172
2nd	Avraham Dayan	€117,630
3rd	Marian Kubis	€86,172
4th	Mick Heder	€63,670
5th	Dieter Becker	€47,452
6th	Christoph Peper	€35,674
7th	Sergii Karpov	€27,057
8th	Alessandro Pezzoli	€20,703
9th	Francesco Candelari	€15,984
