= 2019 World Series of Poker Europe =

Series of poker tournaments

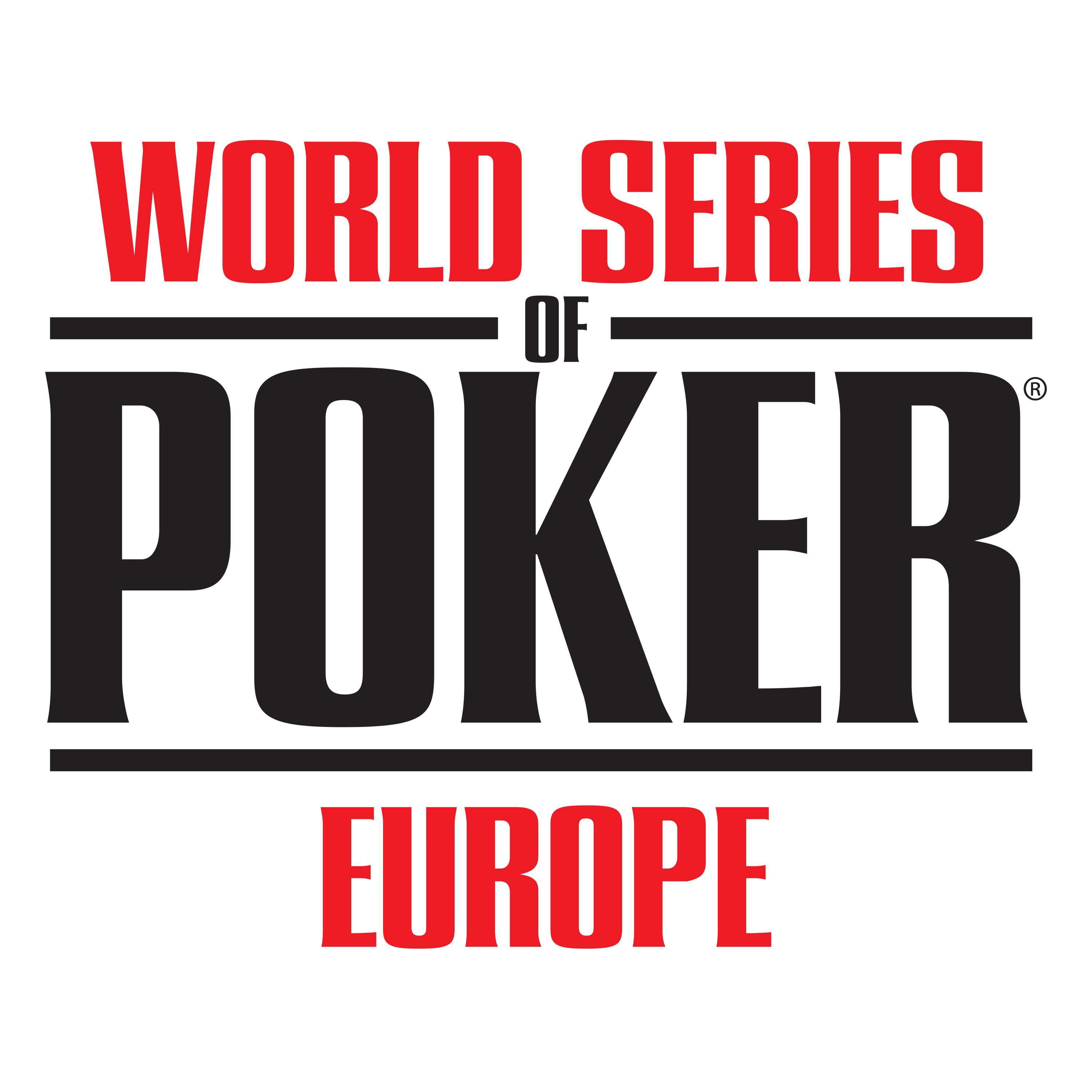
- Location: King's Casino, Rozvadov, Czech Republic
- Dates: 13 October – 4 November 2019

Champion
- (Greece) Alexandros Kolonias

The 2019 World Series of Poker Europe took place from 13 October – 4 November at King's Casino in Rozvadov, Czech Republic. There were 15 bracelet events, including, for the first time at the WSOPE, a short deck event and a €100,000 Diamond High Roller No Limit Hold'em event. The €10,350 No Limit Hold'em Main Event began on 25 October.

== Event schedule ==
High stakes event (€10,000+ buy-in).
No points awarded towards Player of the Year.

#	Event	Entrants	Winner	Prize	Runner-up	Results
1	€350 Opener No Limit Hold'em	1,011	(Ukraine) Renat Bohdanov (1/1)	€53,654	(Hungary) Norbert Mosonyi	Results
2	€550 Pot Limit Omaha 8-Handed	476	(United States) Dash Dudley (2/2)	€51,600	(Canada) Christopher Back	Results
3	€1,350 Mini Main Event No Limit Hold'em	766	(Greece) Vangelis Kaimakamis (1/1)	€167,056	(Israel) Shahar Levi	Results
4	€250,000 Super High Roller No Limit Hold'em	30	(Taiwan) James Chen (1/1)	€2,844,215	(Malaysia) Chin Wei Lim	Results
5	€2,500 8-Game Mix	71	(Norway) Espen Sandvik (1/1)	€75,246	(Finland) Ville Haavisto	Results
6	€25,500 Short Deck High Roller No Limit Hold'em	111	(Germany) Siamak Tooran (1/1)	€740,992	(Vietnam) Thai Ha	Results
7	€1,100 Turbo Bounty Hunter No Limit Hold'em	377	(Czech Republic) Tomas Fara (1/1)	€59,904	(Bosnia and Herzegovina) Nisad Muratovic	Results
8	€25,500 Platinum High Roller No Limit Hold'em	83	(Australia) Kahle Burns (1/1)	€596,883	(United Kingdom) Sam Trickett	Results
9	€1,650 Pot Limit Omaha/No Limit Hold'em Mix	279	(Israel) Asi Moshe (2/4)	€97,465	(Denmark) Kristoffer Rasmussen	Results
10	€25,500 Mixed Games Championship	45	(Switzerland) Besim Hot (1/1)	€385,911	(United States) Phil Hellmuth (0/15)	Results
11	€2,200 Pot Limit Omaha	271	(Portugal) Tomas Ribeiro (1/1)	€128,314	(Sweden) Omar Eljach	Results
12	€100,000 Diamond High Roller No Limit Hold'em	72	(Malaysia) Chin Wei Lim (1/1)	€2,172,104	(France) Jean-Noël Thorel	Results
13	€2,500 Short Deck No Limit Hold'em	179	(Australia) Kahle Burns (2/2)	€101,834	(Germany) Manig Löser	Results
14	€10,350 No Limit Hold'em Main Event	541	(Greece) Alexandros Kolonias (1/1)	€1,133,678	(Germany) Claas Segebrecht	Results
15	€550 Colossus No Limit Hold'em	2,738	(France) Bertrand Grospellier (1/2)	€190,375	(Israel) Avraham Dayan	Results

== Player of the Year ==
Final standings as of 4 November (end of WSOPE):

Standings
Rank	Name	Points	Bracelets
1	(Australia) Robert Campbell	3,961.31	2
2	(United States) Shaun Deeb	3,917.32	0
3	(Canada) Daniel Negreanu	3,861.78	0
4	(United States) Anthony Zinno	3,322.00	1
5	(United States) Phil Hui	3,186.17	1
6	(United States) Daniel Zack	3,126.13	1
7	(Italy) Dario Sammartino	3,091.03	0
8	(United States) Chris Ferguson	2,997.10	0
9	(Australia) Kahle Burns	2,983.37	2
10	(United States) Dash Dudley	2,860.79	2

== Main Event ==
The 2019 World Series of Poker Europe Main Event began on 25 October with the first of two starting flights. Registration remained open until Level 12 on Day 2, with players allowed one re-entry. The final table was reached on 30 October, with the winner being determined on 31 October.

The Main Event attracted 541 entries, the most since 2011 and the biggest field in the three years the tournament was held at King's Casino. The top 82 players finished in the money, with the winner earning €1,133,678.

=== Final Table ===
Name	Number of chips (percentage of total)	WSOP Bracelets	WSOP Cashes*	WSOP Earnings*
(United States) Anthony Zinno	16,845,000 (31.1%)	2	49	$3,134,213
(Greece) Alexandros Kolonias	12,150,000 (22.4%)	0	5	$199,893
(Czech Republic) Anh Do	8,725,000 (16.1%)	0	0	0
(Italy) Dario Sammartino	7,100,000 (13.1%)	0	40	$9,545,240
(Germany) Claas Segebrecht	6,400,000 (11.8%)	0	14	$916,343
(Sweden) Rifat Palevic	2,915,000 (5.4%)	1	10	$617,085

*-Career statistics prior to the beginning of the 2019 WSOPE Main Event

=== Final Table results ===
Place	Name	Prize
1st	Alexandros Kolonias (1/2)	€1,133,678
2nd	Claas Segebrecht	€700,639
3rd	Anthony Zinno (1/2)	€485,291
4th	Dario Sammartino	€341,702
5th	Anh Do	€244,653
6th	Rifat Palevic (0/1)	€178,171
7th	Julien Martini (0/1)	€132,017
8th	Jakob Madsen	€99,555
