= 2019 World Series of Poker =

Series of poker tournaments

- Location: Rio All-Suite Hotel and Casino, Las Vegas, Nevada
- Dates: May 28 – July 16

Champion
- (Germany) Hossein Ensan

The 2019 World Series of Poker was the 50th annual tournament, and took place from May 28 – July 16, 2019, at the Rio All-Suite Hotel & Casino in Las Vegas, Nevada.

There were 90 bracelet events. To celebrate the 50th WSOP there was a $50,000 No Limit Hold'em event as well as the Big 50, a $500 buy-in No Limit Hold'em event with a guaranteed $5 million prize pool and $1 million for the winner. There was also a tournament open only to past WSOP bracelet winners. A short deck tournament was also held for the first time. All No Limit Hold'em events employed the Big Blind Ante format.

The $10,000 No Limit Hold'em Main Event began on July 3 and concluded on July 16. The structure of the Main Event was changed, with players now receiving 60,000 chips at the start of the tournament, up from 50,000 in 2018.

Robert Campbell won two bracelets to earn Player of the Year honors. Daniel Negreanu was originally believed to have won the award for the third time, but it was later found that he was erroneously credited with a cash in an event where he didn't finish in the money. When points for that event were taken away, Negreanu finished third behind Campbell and the 2018 winner, Shaun Deeb.

== Event schedule ==
High stakes event ($10,000+ buy-in).
No points awarded towards Player of the Year.
Online event.

#	Event	Entrants	Winner	Prize	Runner-up	Results
1	$500 Casino Employees No Limit Hold'em	686	(United States) Nicholas Haynes (1/1)	$62,345	(United States) Isaac Hanson	Results
2	$10,000 Super Turbo Bounty No Limit Hold'em	204	(United States) Brian Green (1/1)	$345,669	(Bosnia and Herzegovina) Ali Imsirovic	Results
3	$500 The Big 50 No Limit Hold'em	28,371	(Nigeria) Femi Fashakin (1/1)	$1,147,449	(Canada) Paul Cullen	Results
4	$1,500 Omaha Hi-Lo 8 or Better	853	(United States) Derek McMaster (1/1)	$228,228	(United States) Jason Berilgen	Results
5	$50,000 50th Annual High Roller No Limit Hold'em	110	(United Kingdom) Ben Heath (1/1)	$1,484,085	(United States) Andrew Lichtenberger (0/1)	Results
6	$2,500 Mixed Triple Draw Lowball	296	(United States) Daniel Zack (1/1)	$160,447	(United States) Sumir Mathur	Results
7	$400 WSOP.com Online No Limit Hold'em	2,825	(United States) Yong Kwon (1/1)	$165,263	(Hungary) Gabor Szabo	Results
8	$10,000 Short Deck No Limit Hold'em	114	(United States) Alex Epstein (1/1)	$296,227	(Vietnam) Thai Ha	Results
9	$600 No Limit Hold'em Deepstack	6,151	(United States) Jeremy Pekarek (1/1)	$398,281	(United States) Dan Kuntzman	Results
10	$1,500 Dealers Choice 6-Handed	470	(United States) Scott Clements (1/3)	$144,957	(United States) Tim McDermott	Results
11	$5,000 No Limit Hold'em	400	(United States) Daniel Strelitz (1/1)	$442,385	(United States) Shannon Shorr	Results
12	$1,000 Super Turbo Bounty No Limit Hold'em	2,452	(United States) Daniel Park (1/1)	$226,243	(Canada) Erik Cajelais (0/1)	Results
13	$1,500 No Limit 2-7 Lowball Draw	296	(Israel) Yuval Bronshtein (1/1)	$96,278	(United States) Ajay Chabra	Results
14	$1,500 H.O.R.S.E.	751	(Brazil) Murilo Souza (1/1)	$207,003	(United States) Jason Stockfish	Results
15	$10,000 Heads Up No Limit Hold'em Championship	112	(United States) Sean Swingruber (1/1)	$186,356	(United States) Ben Yu (0/3)	Results
16	$1,500 No Limit Hold'em 6-Handed	1,832	(United States) Isaac Baron (1/1)	$407,739	(Singapore) Ong Dingxiang	Results
17	$1,500 No Limit Hold'em Shootout	917	(United States) Brett Apter (1/1)	$238,824	(Russia) Anatolii Zyrin	Results
18	$10,000 Omaha Hi-Lo 8 or Better Championship	183	(United States) Frankie O'Dell (1/3)	$443,641	(Pakistan) Owais Ahmed (0/2)	Results
19	$1,500 Millionaire Maker No Limit Hold'em	8,809	(United States) John Gorsuch (1/1)	$1,344,930	(Japan) Kazuki Ikeuchi	Results
20	$1,500 Seven Card Stud	285	(Israel) Eli Elezra (1/4)	$93,766	(United States) Anthony Zinno (0/1)	Results
21	$10,000 No Limit 2-7 Lowball Draw Championship	91	(United States) Jim Bechtel (1/2)	$253,817	(United States) Vince Musso	Results
22	$1,000 Double Stack No Limit Hold'em	3,253	(United States) Jorden Fox (1/1)	$420,693	(United States) Jayachandra Gangaiah	Results
23	$1,500 Eight Game Mix 6-Handed	612	(United States) Rami Boukai (1/2)	$177,294	(United States) John Evans	Results
24	$600 WSOP.com Online Pot Limit Omaha 6-Handed	1,216	(United States) Josh Pollock (1/2)	$139,470	(United States) Jason Gooch	Results
25	$600 Pot Limit Omaha Deepstack	2,577	(United States) Andrew Donabedian (1/1)	$205,605	(United States) Todd Dreyer	Results
26	$2,620 Marathon No Limit Hold'em	1,083	(Russia) Roman Korenev (1/1)	$477,401	(United States) Jared Koppel	Results
27	$1,500 Seven Card Stud Hi-Lo 8 or Better	460	(United States) Michael Mizrachi (1/5)	$142,801	(United States) Robert Gray	Results
28	$1,000 No Limit Hold'em	2,477	(United States) Stephen Song (1/1)	$341,854	(United States) Scot Masters	Results
29	$10,000 H.O.R.S.E. Championship	172	(Canada) Greg Mueller (1/3)	$425,347	(Colombia) Daniel Ospina	Results
30	$1,000 Pot Limit Omaha	1,526	(El Salvador) Luis Zedan (1/1)	$236,673	(United States) Thida Lin	Results
31	$3,000 No Limit Hold'em 6-Handed	754	(France) Thomas Cazayous (1/1)	$414,766	(United States) Nicholas Howard	Results
32	$1,000 Seniors No Limit Hold'em Championship	5,917	(United States) Howard Mash (1/1)	$662,594	(France) Jean-René Fontaine	Results
33	$1,500 Limit 2-7 Lowball Triple Draw	467	(Australia) Robert Campbell (1/1)	$144,027	(United States) David Bach (0/3)	Results
34	$1,000 Double Stack No Limit Hold'em	6,214	(South Korea) Joseph Cheong (1/1)	$687,782	(United States) David Ivers	Results
35	$10,000 Dealers Choice 6-Handed Championship	122	(United States) Adam Friedman (1/3)	$312,417	(United States) Shaun Deeb (0/4)	Results
36	$3,000 No Limit Hold'em Shootout	313	(United States) David Lambard (1/1)	$207,193	(France) Johan Guilbert	Results
37	$800 No Limit Hold'em Deepstack	2,808	(United States) Robert Mitchell (1/1)	$297,537	(Italy) Marco Bognanni	Results
38	$600 WSOP.com Online Knockout Bounty No Limit Hold'em	1,224	(Sri Lanka) Upeshka De Silva (1/3)	$98,263	(United States) David Nodes	Results
39	$1,000 Super Seniors No Limit Hold'em	2,650	(United States) Michael Blake (1/1)	$359,863	(United States) Barry Shulman (0/2)	Results
40	$1,500 Pot Limit Omaha	1,216	(Germany) Ismael Bojang (1/1)	$298,507	(United States) James Little	Results
41	$10,000 Seven Card Stud Championship	88	(United States) John Hennigan (1/6)	$245,451	(Canada) Daniel Negreanu (0/6)	Results
42	$600 8-Handed No Limit Hold'em/Pot Limit Omaha Deepstack	2,403	(Greece) Aristeidis Moschonas (1/1)	$194,759	(United States) Dan Matsuzuki	Results
43	$2,500 Mixed Big Bet Event	218	(United States) Loren Klein (1/4)	$127,808	(United States) Ryan Hughes (0/2)	Results
44	$1,500 Bounty No Limit Hold'em	1,807	(Israel) Asi Moshe (1/3)	$253,933	(United States) Damjan Radanov	Results
45	$25,000 High Roller Pot Limit Omaha	278	(United Kingdom) Stephen Chidwick (1/1)	$1,618,417	(Taiwan) James Chen	Results
46	$500 WSOP.com Online Turbo No Limit Hold'em Deepstack	1,181	(United States) Dan Lupo (1/1)	$145,274	(United States) David Clarke	Results
47	$10,000/$1,000 Ladies No-Limit Hold'em Championship	968	(South Korea) Jiyoung Kim (1/1)	$167,308	(United States) Nancy Matson	Results
48	$2,500 No Limit Hold'em	996	(Canada) Ari Engel (1/1)	$427,399	(Uruguay) Pablo Melogno	Results
49	$10,000 Limit 2-7 Lowball Triple Draw Championship	100	(United Kingdom) Luke Schwartz (1/1)	$273,336	(United States) George Wolff	Results
50	$1,500 Monster Stack No Limit Hold'em	6,035	(United States) Kainalu McCue-Unciano (1/1)	$1,008,850	(France) Vincent Chauve	Results
51	$2,500 Omaha/Seven Card Stud Hi-Lo 8 or Better	401	(Brazil) Yuri Dzivielevski (1/1)	$213,750	(United States) Michael Thompson	Results
52	$10,000 Pot Limit Omaha 8-Handed	518	(United States) Dash Dudley (1/1)	$1,086,967	(United Kingdom) James Park	Results
53	$800 8-Handed No Limit Hold'em Deepstack	3,759	(Spain) Santiago Soriano (1/1)	$371,203	(Israel) Amir Lehavot	Results
54	$1,500 Razz	363	(United States) Kevin Gerhart (1/1)	$119,054	(Brazil) Sergio Braga	Results
55	$1,000 WSOP.com Online Double Stack No Limit Hold'em	1,333	(United States) Jason Gooch (1/1)	$241,493	(United States) Brian Wood	Results
56	$1,500 Super Turbo Bounty No Limit Hold'em	1,867	(Germany) Jonas Lauck (1/1)	$260,335	(United Kingdom) Robert Bickley	Results
57	$1,000 Tag Team No Limit Hold'em	976	(Israel) Daniel Dayan (1/1) (Israel) Ohad Geiger (1/1) (Israel) Barak Wisbrod (1/1)	$168,395	(United States) Lawrence Chan (United States) Matthew Moreno (United States) Jerod Smith	Results
58	$50,000 Poker Players Championship	74	(United States) Phil Hui (1/2)	$1,099,311	(United States) Josh Arieh (0/2)	Results
59	$600 Deepstack Championship No Limit Hold'em	6,140	(United States) Joe Foresman (1/1)	$397,903	(United States) Will Givens (0/1)	Results
60	$1,500 Pot Limit Omaha Hi-Lo 8 or Better	1,117	(United States) Anthony Zinno (1/2)	$279,920	(United States) Rodney Burt	Results
61	$400 The Colossus No Limit Hold'em	13,109	(South Korea) Sejin Park (1/1)	$451,272	(Greece) Georgios Kapalas	Results
62	$10,000 Razz Championship	116	(United States) Scott Seiver (1/3)	$301,421	(Russia) Andrey Zhigalov (0/1)	Results
63	$1,500 Mixed Pot Limit Omaha Hi-Lo/Big O	717	(Russia) Anatolii Zyrin (1/1)	$199,838	(China) Yueqi Zhu (0/1)	Results
64	$888 Crazy Eights No Limit Hold'em	10,185	(United States) Rick Alvarado (1/1)	$888,888	(Canada) Mark Radoja (0/2)	Results
65	$10,000 Pot Limit Omaha Hi-Lo 8 or Better Championship	193	(United States) Nick Schulman (1/3)	$463,670	(United States) Brian Hastings (0/4)	Results
66	$1,500 Limit Hold'em	541	(United States) David "ODB" Baker (1/2)	$161,139	(United States) Brian Kim	Results
67	$10,000 Seven Card Stud Hi-Lo 8 or Better Championship	151	(Australia) Robert Campbell (2/2)	$385,763	(China) Yueqi Zhu (0/1)	Results
68	$1,000 WSOP.com Online No Limit Hold'em Championship	1,750	(United States) Nicholas Baris (1/1)	$303,739	(United States) Tara Cain	Results
69	$1,000 The Mini Main Event No Limit Hold'em	5,521	(France) Jeremy Saderne (1/1)	$628,654	(United States) Lula Taylor	Results
70	$5,000 No Limit Hold'em 6-Handed	815	(Portugal) João Vieira (1/1)	$758,011	(United States) Joe Cada (0/4)	Results
71	$500 Salute to Warriors No Limit Hold'em	1,723	(United States) Susan Faber (1/1)	$121,161	(United States) Rob Stark	Results
72	$10,000 Limit Hold'em Championship	118	(Finland) Juha Helppi (1/1)	$306,622	(United States) Mike Lancaster	Results
73	$10,000 No Limit Hold'em Main Event	8,569	(Germany) Hossein Ensan (1/1)	$10,000,000	(Italy) Dario Sammartino	Results
74	$3,200 WSOP.com Online No Limit Hold'em High Roller	593	(United States) Brandon Adams (1/1)	$411,561	(Spain) Nabil Cardoso	Results
75	$1,111 Little One for One Drop No Limit Hold'em	6,248	(United States) James Anderson (1/1)	$690,686	(Brazil) Fernando Karam	Results
76	$800 WSOP.com Online No Limit Hold'em 6-Handed	1,560	(Canada) Shawn Buchanan (1/1)	$223,119	(United States) David "Bakes" Baker (0/2)	Results
77	$3,000 Limit Hold'em 6-Handed	193	(Canada) Stephanie Dao (1/1)	$133,189	(United States) Alain Alinat	Results
90 (Note: Late addition to the schedule)	$50,000 Final Fifty High Roller No Limit Hold'em	123	(Hong Kong) Danny Tang (1/1)	$1,608,406	(United States) Sam Soverel (0/1)	Results
78	$1,500 Bounty Pot Limit Omaha	1,130	(Germany) Maximilian Klostermeier (1/1)	$177,823	(Republic of Ireland) David Callaghan	Results
79	$3,000 No Limit Hold'em	671	(France) Ivan Deyra (1/1)	$380,090	(United States) David Gonzalez	Results
80	$1,500 Mixed No Limit Hold'em/Pot Limit Omaha	1,250	(Sweden) Jerry Odeen (1/1)	$304,793	(United Kingdom) Peter Linton	Results
81	$1,500 50th Annual Bracelet Winners Only No Limit Hold'em	185	(United States) Shankar Pillai (1/2)	$71,580	(United States) Michael Gagliano (0/1)	Results
82	$1,500 Double Stack No Limit Hold'em	2,589	(United States) Tom Koral (1/2)	$530,164	(Netherlands) Freek Scholten	Results
83	$100,000 High Roller No Limit Hold'em	99	(United States) Keith Tilston (1/1)	$2,792,406	(Canada) Daniel Negreanu (0/6)	Results
84	$1,500 The Closer No Limit Hold'em	2,800	(India) Abhinav Iyer (1/1)	$565,346	(Canada) Sammy Lafleur	Results
85	$3,000 Pot Limit Omaha 6-Handed	835	(United States) Alan Sternberg (1/1)	$448,392	(Greece) Evangelos Kokkalis	Results
86	$10,000 No Limit Hold'em 6-Handed Championship	272	(United States) Anuj Agarwal (1/1)	$630,747	(Australia) Kahle Burns	Results
87	$3,000 H.O.R.S.E.	301	(Russia) Denis Strebkov (1/1)	$206,173	(France) Paul Tedeschi	Results
88	$500 WSOP.com Online Summer Saver No Limit Hold'em	1,859	(United States) Taylor Paur (1/2)	$149,241	(Switzerland) Francois Evard	Results
89	$5,000 No Limit Hold'em	608	(United Kingdom) Carl Shaw (1/1)	$606,562	(United States) Tony Dunst (0/1)	Results

== Player of the Year ==
Final standings as of November 4 (end of WSOPE):

Standings
Rank	Name	Points	Bracelets
1	(Australia) Robert Campbell	3,961.31	2
2	(United States) Shaun Deeb	3,917.32	0
3	(Canada) Daniel Negreanu	3,861.78	0
4	(United States) Anthony Zinno	3,322.00	1
5	(United States) Phil Hui	3,186.17	1
6	(United States) Daniel Zack	3,126.13	1
7	(Italy) Dario Sammartino	3,091.03	0
8	(United States) Chris Ferguson	2,997.10	0
9	(Australia) Kahle Burns	2,983.37	2
10	(United States) Dash Dudley	2,860.79	2

== Leaders ==
Note: these statistics not including the 15 WSOPE events.

Cashes
Rank	Name	Cashes
1	(United States) Chris Ferguson	19
T2	(Brazil) Marcelo Giordano Mendes	18
T2	(United States) Jake Schwartz	18
T2	(United States) Steven Wolansky	18
T5	(United States) Shaun Deeb	17
T5	(Canada) Daniel Negreanu	17
T7	(United States) Jon Turner	16
T7	(China) Yueqi Zhu	16
T9	(United States) Scott Bohlman	15
T9	(Germany) Ismael Bojang	15
T9	(United States) Noah Bronstein	15

Final Tables
Rank	Name	Final Tables
T1	(Australia) Robert Campbell	4
T1	(United States) Shaun Deeb	4
T1	(Canada) Daniel Negreanu	4
T4	(United States) Brandon Adams	3
T4	(United States) Josh Arieh	3
T4	(United States) David "Bakes" Baker	3
T4	(United States) Scott Clements	3
T4	(United States) Chris Ferguson	3
T4	(United States) Phil Hui	3
T4	(Bosnia and Herzegovina) Ali Imsirovic	3
T4	(United States) Cary Katz	3
T4	(United States) Joseph Liberta	3
T4	(Italy) Dario Sammartino	3
T4	(United States) Nick Schulman	3
T4	(Russia) Denis Strebkov	3
T4	(Canada) Benjamin Underwood	3
T4	(United States) Bryce Yockey	3
T4	(United States) Daniel Zack	3
T4	(China) Yueqi Zhu	3
T4	(United States) Anthony Zinno	3

== Main Event ==
The $10,000 No Limit Hold'em Main Event began on July 3 with the first of three starting flights. The final table of 9 was reached on July 12, with the finalists returning on July 14 before a winner was determined on July 16.

The Main Event attracted 8,569 players, the second-largest field in history after 2006. The winner earned $10,000,000, with 1,286 players finishing in the money. There was a mixup at the money bubble, with Ryan Pochedly originally being credited with bursting the bubble. Several days later, however, it was determined that one elimination had not been taken into account, and Pochedly had actually finished in 1,286th place, therefore making the money.

Three past champions made the money, including Chris Moneymaker who cashed in the Main Event for the first time since winning in 2003. Moneymaker, along with David Oppenheim, was announced as the newest inductees into the Poker Hall of Fame during the final table.

=== Performance of past champions ===
Name	Championship Year(s)	Day of Elimination
Johnny Chan	1987, 1988	4 (560th)*
Phil Hellmuth	1989	2C
Jim Bechtel	1993	3
Scotty Nguyen	1998	3
Chris Ferguson	2000	2AB
Robert Varkonyi	2002	2C
Chris Moneymaker	2003	4 (687th)*
Greg Raymer	2004	2AB
Joe Hachem	2005	3
Jamie Gold	2006	1C
Jerry Yang	2007	2C
Joe Cada	2009	1C
Greg Merson	2012	2AB
Ryan Riess	2013	2AB
Martin Jacobson	2014	1C
Joe McKeehen	2015	2C
Qui Nguyen	2016	4 (455th)*
Scott Blumstein	2017	2C
John Cynn	2018	3

*-Indicates player who finished in the money

=== Other notable high finishes ===
NB: This list is restricted to top 100 finishers with an existing Wikipedia entry.

Place	Name	Prize
28th	Yuri Dzivielevski	$261,430
40th	Alex Foxen	$211,945
67th	Jake Schindler	$117,710
82nd	Antonio Esfandiari	$82,365

=== Final Table ===
Name	Number of chips (percentage of total)	WSOP Bracelets	WSOP Cashes*	WSOP Earnings*
(Germany) Hossein Ensan	177,000,000 (34.4%)	0	1	$3,276
(United States) Garry Gates	99,300,000 (19.3%)	0	11	$156,728
(United States) Zhen Cai	60,600,000 (11.8%)	0	15	$101,151
(United States) Kevin Maahs	43,000,000 (8.4%)	0	0	0
(Canada) Alex Livingston	37,800,000 (7.3%)	0	16	$629,241
(Italy) Dario Sammartino	33,400,000 (6.5%)	0	38	$3,446,537
(Serbia) Milos Skrbic	23,400,000 (4.5%)	0	5	$313,598
(United States) Timothy Su	20,200,000 (3.9%)	0	1	$927
(United Kingdom) Nick Marchington	20,100,000 (3.9%)	0	1	$12,415

*Career statistics prior to the 2019 Main Event

=== Final Table results ===
Place	Name	Prize
1st	Hossein Ensan	$10,000,000
2nd	Dario Sammartino	$6,000,000
3rd	Alex Livingston	$4,000,000
4th	Garry Gates	$3,000,000
5th	Kevin Maahs	$2,200,000
6th	Zhen Cai	$1,850,000
7th	Nick Marchington	$1,525,000
8th	Timothy Su	$1,250,000
9th	Milos Skrbic	$1,000,000

== Records ==
- The Main Event field was the largest since 2006, and the top prize of $10 million was the largest since 2014.
- Event #3: $500 Big 50 No Limit Hold'em became the largest live poker tournament in history with 28,371 entrants, surpassing the previous record of 22,374 held by the Colossus in 2015.
- Jim Bechtel, the 1993 Main Event champion, won Event #21: $10,000 No Limit 2-7 Lowball Draw for his first bracelet since his Main Event win. The 26 years between bracelet wins is the longest in WSOP history.
- Loren Klein won Event #43: $2,500 Mixed Big Bet, becoming the first player since Doyle Brunson from 1976–79 and just the third overall to win bracelets in four straight years.
