= Adam Friedman =

Adam Friedman may refer to:

- Adam Friedman (singer)
- Adam Friedman (poker player)
