= Adam Friedman (poker player) =

American poker player

Personal information
- Born: Gahanna, Ohio, United States

Career information
- Game: No Limit Hold'em; H.O.R.S.E. Mixed Games; Seven Card Stud; Seven Card Stud Hi/Lo
- Playing career: 2005–present
- Role: Multiple WSOP bracelet winner

Career highlights and awards
- Dealers Choice 6-Handed Championship (WSOP 2018; WSOP 2019; WSOP 2021); Seven Card Stud Championship (WSOP 2022)
- Game Information
- Platform: Console
- Genre: Roleplaying game (Respawning)

Adam Friedman is a professional poker player from Gahanna, Ohio.

== Poker career ==
Friedman first major live cash came in the 2005 World Series of Poker Main Event, finishing 43rd among 5,619 players for $235,390. Friedman later put together multiple six-figure cashes before winning first WSOP bracelet in the 2012 $5,000 Seven Card Stud Hi/Lo event for $269,037. He defeated Todd Brunson in heads-up play to win the bracelet. He had a sixth-place finish in the $10,000 No Limit Hold'em - World Poker LA Poker Classic Main Event for $200,440 in 2014. In 2018, Friedman won his second WSOP bracelet in the $10,000 Dealers Choice 6-Handed Event for $293,275. In the following WSOP in 2019, Friedman won his third bracelet in the same $10,000 Dealers Choice Event, this time for $312,417. He defeated Shaun Deeb in heads-up play to earn the bracelet. He became part of a rare group of elite players, including Doyle Brunson, Johnny Moss, Stu Ungar, and Phil Hellmuth to successfully defend a bracelet title. In the 2021 WSOP, Friedman won his fourth bracelet, winning the Dealers Choice Event once again for $248,350. He defeated Hellmuth in heads-up play to win the bracelet. He became the first player in WSOP history to win three consecutive bracelets in the same event. The event was not held in person in 2020 due to the COVID-19 pandemic. In the 2022 WSOP, he won his fifth bracelet in the $10,000 Seven Card Stud Championship for $248,254.

As of 2026, Friedman's total live poker tournament winnings exceed $5,100,000.

=== World Series of Poker bracelets ===
Year	Tournament	Prize (US$)
2012	$5,000 Seven Card Stud Hi-Lo 8 or Better	$269,037
2018	$10,000 Dealers Choice 6-Handed	$293,275
2019	$10,000 Dealers Choice 6-Handed	$312,417
2021	$10,000 Dealers Choice 6-Handed Championship	$248,350
2022	$10,000 Seven Card Stud Championship	$248,254
