= Isaac Baron =

American poker player (born 1987)

- Nickname: westmenloAA
- Born: July 10, 1987 (age 39)

World Series of Poker
- Bracelet: 1
- Money finishes: 26
- Highest WSOP Main Event finish: 52nd, 2014

World Poker Tour
- Title: None
- Final table: 1
- Money finishes: 15

European Poker Tour
- Title: None
- Final table: 1
- Money finishes: 2

Isaac Baron (born July 10, 1987) an American professional poker player from Menlo Park, California. He was the winner of the first Card Player Magazine Online Poker Player of the Year Award in 2007.

== Poker ==
=== Online poker ===
Playing under the screen names of "westmenloAA" on PokerStars and "Isaac Baron" on Full Tilt Poker, Baron's online winnings exceeded $1,000,000 in 2007, including a win in the PokerStars weekly Sunday Million tournament in January for $254,000. He has also been able to translate his online success to live games. At a time when he was unable to play tournaments in the United States because of his age, he cashed four times in World Poker Tour and two European Poker Tour events held outside of the U.S.

==== Full Tilt Online Poker Series (FTOPS) ====
Baron under the screen name "the guru 11," won the first event of FTOPS VIII on May 8, 2008, earning $158,852.

=== European Poker Tour ===
At the 2008 European Poker Tour (EPT) San Remo, Baron cashed in his first EPT after being eliminated in 11th place by Dario Minieri.

At the 2008 PokerStars.com EPT Grand Final in Monte Carlo, Baron made the final table finishing in 4th place. He exited the tournament holding AQ against eventual winner Glen Chorney's pocket aces, he picked himself up €589,000 ($932,692) for his efforts.

In April 2010, at the EPT Monte Carlo Grand Final, Baron won $408,036 for winning the tournament.

=== Other tournaments ===
In January 2014, Baron finished 3rd in the PokerStars Caribbean Adventure Main Event for $1,207,599, his largest cash to date.

In March 2015, Baron finished runner-up in the WPT Bay 101 Shooting Star in San Jose for $704,200. He won his first bracelet at the 2019 WSOP in the $ 1,500 No Limit Hold'em - 6-Handed Event for $407,739.

As of 2023, Baron's total live tournament winnings exceed $6,600,000.

== World Series of Poker Bracelets ==
Year	Tournament	Prize (US$)
2019	$1,500 No Limit Hold'em 6-Handed	$407,739
