= Scott Clements =

American poker player (born 1981)

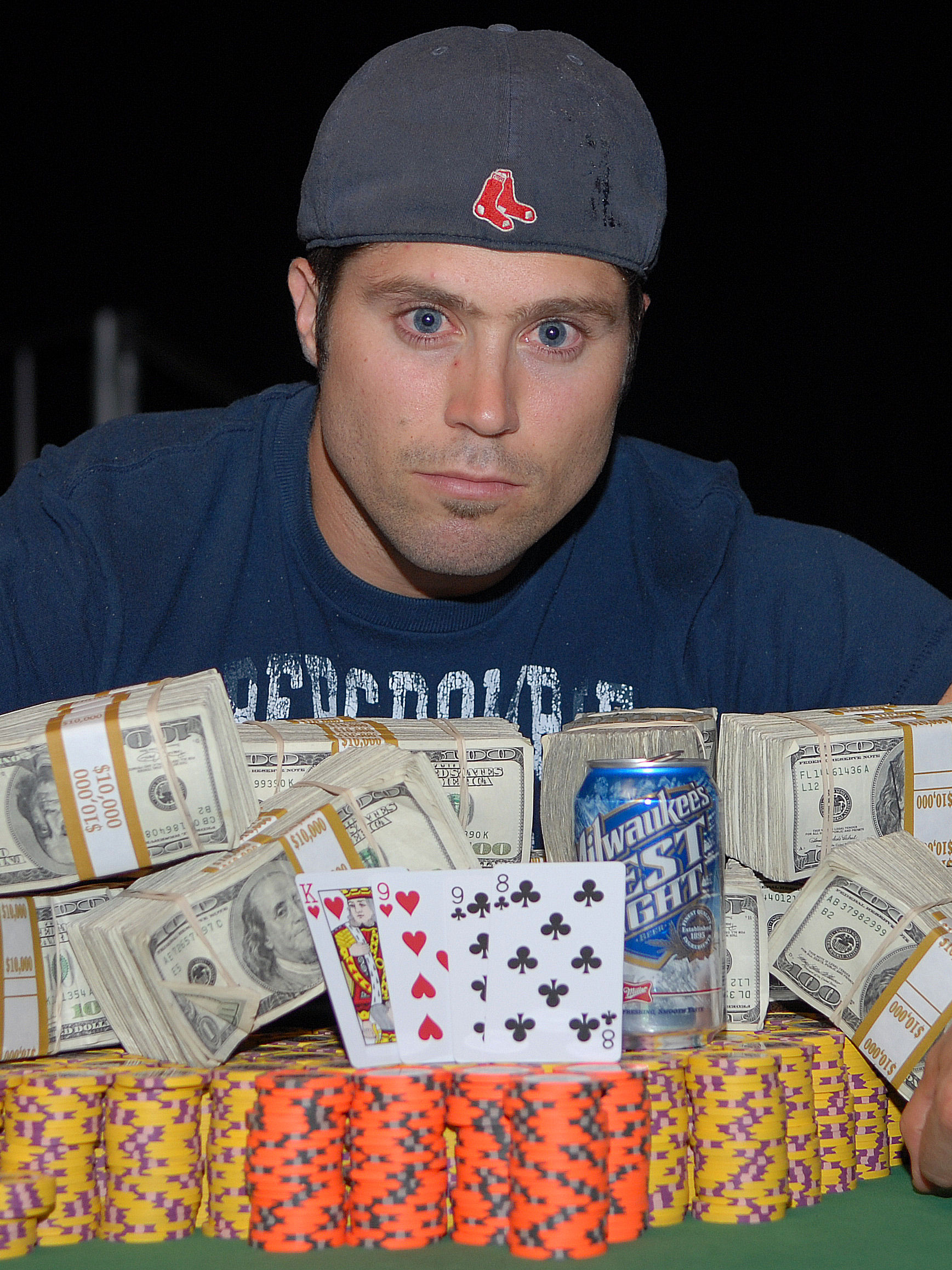
- Clements at the 2007 World Series of Poker
- Nickname: BigRiskky
- Born: July 19, 1981 (age 45)

World Series of Poker
- Bracelets: 4
- Money finishes: 63
- Highest WSOP Main Event finish: 18th, 2010

World Poker Tour
- Titles: 2
- Final tables: 3
- Money finishes: 10

Scott Clements (born July 19, 1981) is a professional poker player from Mount Vernon, Washington, United States, who has won titles in both World Poker Tour (WPT) and World Series of Poker (WSOP) events.

Clements has won four championship bracelets at the WSOP.

In addition to his success in Omaha games at the WSOP, Clements has also claimed victory on the WPT, winning the 2006 Canadian Open Championship and taking home $222,254. In November 2007, he won the second annual WPT North American Poker Classic at Fallsview Casino and winning over $1,137,593.

As of 2018, Clements' total live tournament winnings exceed $7,650,000. His 56 cashes at the WSOP account for over $2,800,000 of those winnings.

In 2015 Clements was one of the 18 coaches featured in Jonathan Little’s bestselling book “Excelling at No Limit Hold’em”

== World Series of Poker Bracelets ==
Year	Tournament	Prize (US$)
2006	$3,000 Omaha Hi-Lo Split 8-or-better	$301,175
2007	$1,500 Pot-Limit Omaha	$194,206
2019	$1,500 Dealers Choice	$144,957
2026	$10,000 Limit Omaha Hi-Lo 8 or Better Championship (8-Handed)	$450,176
