= Juha Helppi =

Finnish poker player (born 1977)

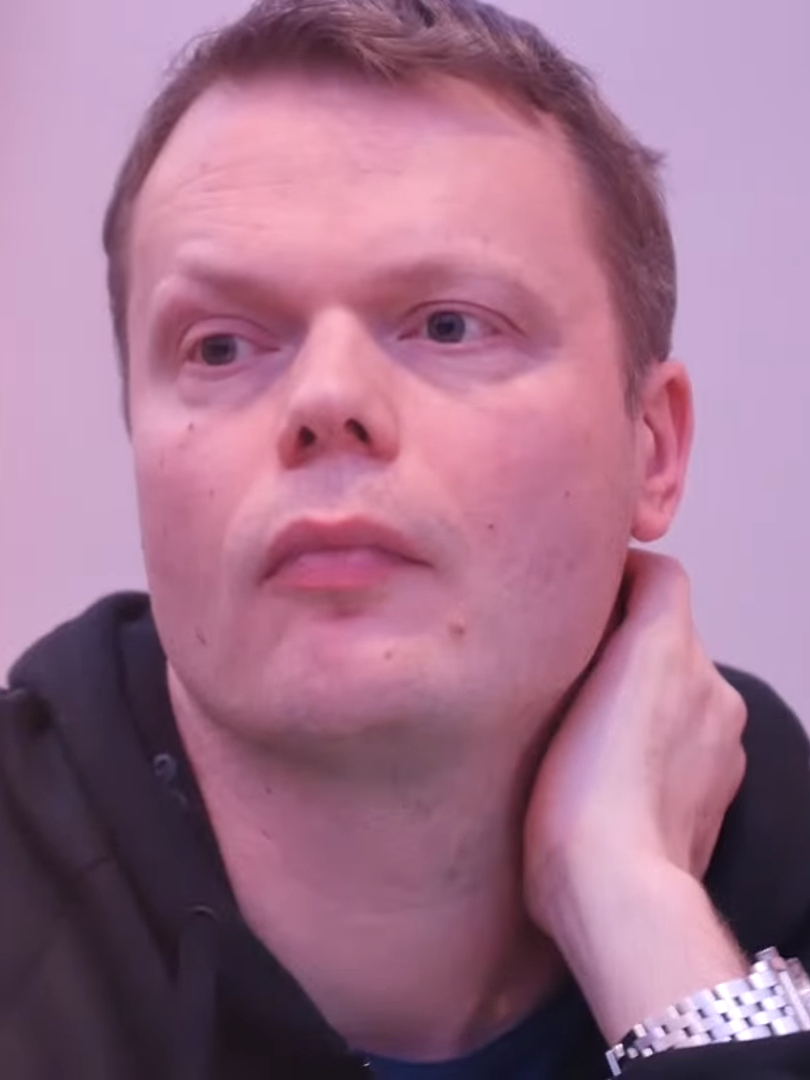
- Helppi in 2017
- Nickname: Peasant
- Born: 4 March 1977 (age 49); Finland

World Series of Poker
- Bracelets: 2
- Money finishes: 30
- Highest WSOP Main Event finish: 86th, 2010

World Poker Tour
- Title: 1
- Final tables: 2(+1)
- Money finishes: 10(+1)

European Poker Tour
- Final table: 1
- Money finishes: 5

Juha Helppi (born 4 March 1977) is a Finnish professional poker player from Helsinki.

== Career ==
Helppi was originally a croupier. He worked as a dealer for RAY in Finland but never dealt poker. He made a name for himself in the first World Poker Tour (WPT) event in Aruba, where he eliminated Kathy Liebert on the way to defeating professional player Phil Gordon in a heads-up challenge match. He has since made two other WPT final tables, with a 4th-place finish in the Season 1 Battle of Champions and a 2nd-place finish to England's Roland De Wolfe in the Grand Prix de Paris 2005 event.

At the 2019 World Series of Poker, Helppi won his first World Series of Poker bracelet in Event #72, the $10,000 Limit Hold'em Championship, defeating Mike Lancaster heads-up after about four hours of play to take the $306,622 first prize in a field of 118 entries. Before the win he had finished runner-up at the WSOP three times, and also had one third-place, one fourth-place and one fifth-place finish. He won his second WSOP bracelet in the 2020 WSOP Online. In total, he has finished in the money in 29 WSOP events.

In November 2005, Helppi faced Phil Laak and Kenna James in the first ever underwater poker tournament and was awarded the Caribbean Poker Classic Extreme Poker bracelet.

In March 2007, Helppi won the inaugural Premier League Poker title, defeating some of the all-time greats along the way, such as Phil Hellmuth and Dave "Devilfish" Ulliott. Helppi defeated German pro and two-time WSOP Bracelet winner Eddy Scharf In heads-up play to win the title.

As the winner of InterPoker's first extreme poker tournament, he earned the right to choose the next year's location. He chose to play it in Kemi on the frozen Gulf of Bothnia. He finished second, losing to former WSOP champion Robert Varkonyi.

As of 2019, his total live tournament winnings exceed $7,700,000. His WSOP cashes account for over $1,350,000 of those winnings.

Helppi is a high level paintball player and the captain of the Finnish national paintball champions 1997, 2003, 2007, 2008 and 2014. When younger, he played Magic: The Gathering successfully for several years.

== World Series of Poker bracelets ==
Year	Tournament	Prize (US$)
2019	$10,000 Limit Hold'em Championship	$306,622
2020 O	$5,000 Pot Limit Omaha Championship	$290,286

An "O" following a year denotes bracelet(s) won during the World Series of Poker Online

=== 2026 World Series of Poker ===
At the 2026 World Series of Poker, Helppi finished as runner-up in Event #64, the $25,000 High Roller PLO/NLH Mixed, which drew 214 entries and a $5,029,000 prize pool. He finished Day 1 as chip leader among the 60 remaining players. Both Helppi and his heads-up opponent, fellow Finn Eelis Parssinen, were playing for a third WSOP bracelet, which would have made the winner the most decorated bracelet winner from Finland. Parssinen won and took the top prize of $1,172,296. Helppi received $781,500 for second place.
