= Loren Klein =

American poker player

- Nickname: The Variance Authority

World Series of Poker
- Bracelets: 4
- Final tables: 10
- Money finishes: 39
- Highest WSOP Main Event finish: 72nd, 2026

Loren Klein (sometimes L.J. Klein) is a professional poker player who has won four World Series of Poker bracelets. He began playing online in about 2007 and began live play in 2011 following Black Friday in 2011. He won World Series of Poker bracelets at the 2016, 2017, 2018, and 2019 World Series of Poker. Klein was the third player to win bracelets in three consecutive years (following Allen Cunningham 2005–07 and Matt Matros 2010–12) since the poker boom.

Klein was raised in Michigan. After moving west to play live, Klein made Reno, Nevada his home. Among the players that Klein considers to be his poker colleagues are Chance Kornuth, Ben Lamb and Johnny Beauprez.

He was known as L.J. Klein when he finished as runner up to Miguel Proulx in Event #28: $2,500 Pot-Limit Omaha at the 2010 World Series of Poker. By the time he final tabled Event #50: $2,500 10-Game Mix (Six Handed) at the 2013 World Series of Poker, he was known as Loren Klein. His first bracelet came in the 919-player 2016 Event #45: $1,500 Mixed No-Limit Hold'em/Pot-Limit Omaha for $241,427. That year he also finished as runner-up to Brandon Shack-Harris in the 400-player Event #51 – $10,000 Eight-Handed Pot Limit Omaha World Championship. His second bracelet occurred in the 870-player 2017 Event #41: $1,500 Pot Limit Omaha for $231,483. His third bracelet came in the 476-player 2018 Event #49: $10,000 Pot-Limit Omaha 8-Handed Championship for $1,018,336 at a final table that included Shack-Harris (who finished third).

At the 2019 WSOP, Klein won the $2,500 Mixed Big Bet event, becoming the first player since Doyle Brunson from 1976 to 1979 and just the third overall in WSOP history to win bracelets in four straight years.

As of 2023, Klein's live tournament winnings exceed $3 million.

== World Series of Poker ==
As of July 8, 2018

World Series of Poker results
Year	Cashes	Final Tables	Bracelets
2008	3	0	0
2009	3	0	0
2010	2	1	0
2012	3	0	0
2013	2	1	0
2014	6	2	0
2016	7	2	1
2017	5	1	1
2018	3	1	1

World Series of Poker bracelets
Year	Tournament	Prize (US$)
2016	$1,500 Mixed No-Limit Hold'em/Pot-Limit Omaha	$241,427
2017	$1,500 Pot-Limit Omaha	$231,483
2018	$10,000 Pot-Limit Omaha 8-Handed Championship	$1,018,336
2019	$2,500 Mixed Big Bet	$127,808

Source: WSOP.com
