= Robert Campbell (poker player) =

Australian poker player

- Nickname: SonicJaxx

World Series of Poker
- Bracelets: 2
- Money finishes: 27
- Highest WSOP Main Event finish: 435th, 2016

Robert Campbell is an Australian poker player from Melbourne. In 2019, he won two bracelets at the World Series of Poker on his way to earning the WSOP Player of the Year Award.

Campbell was formerly a professional esports player and was the top-ranked Pokémon player in the world. He also worked as a standup comedian. He's currently CEO of the Dota 2 gaming team Neon Esports. His first WSOP cash came from a final table appearance in a Mixed Event at the 2013 WSOP Asia Pacific in his hometown. In 2015, he finished second in a $1,500 H.O.R.S.E. event at the WSOP. He had four prior final tables at the WSOP before 2019.

At the 2019 WSOP, Campbell won his first bracelet in the $1,500 Limit 2-7 Lowball Triple Draw event, defeating three-time bracelet winner David Bach heads-up and earning $144,000. He added his second bracelet in the $10,000 Seven Card Stud Hi-Lo event, becoming the first player with multiple bracelets in 2019.

With 3,418.78 points, Campbell took the lead in the POY race into the WSOP Europe. He added another four cashes in Rozvadov, including a final table appearance in the €25,500 Platinum High Roller event. Daniel Negreanu, however, passed him in the standings to win the award for the third time. Afterward, it was discovered that Negreanu was given credit for a cash in an event where he did not finish in the money, and when points for that event were taken away Campbell was 44 points ahead of runner-up Shaun Deeb.

Campbell finished the 2019 WSOP with two bracelets, five final tables, 13 cashes and more than $750,000 in earnings. His total live winnings exceed $1,360,000, with his 27 WSOP cashes accounting for $1,232,000 of those earnings.

== World Series of Poker bracelets ==
Year	Tournament	Prize (US$)
2019	$1,500 Limit 2-7 Lowball Triple Draw	$144,027
2019	$10,000 Seven Card Stud Hi-Lo 8 or Better	$385,763
