= Hossein Ensan =

Iranian-German poker player (born 1964)

- Born: 22 May 1964 (age 62); Ahwaz, Iran

World Series of Poker
- Bracelet: 1
- Final table: 1
- Money finishes: 2
- Highest WSOP Main Event finish: Winner, 2019

European Poker Tour
- Title: 1
- Final tables: 3
- Money finishes: 6

Hossein Ensan (born 22 May 1964) is an Iranian-German professional poker player from Greven, Germany. In 2019, he won the Main Event at the World Series of Poker for $10,000,000.

Ensan was born in Iran and moved to Germany in 1989 at the age of 25. There, he studied civil engineering at the University of Münster. He was unable to pay his bills, especially at the time when he was beginning a family. He has a daughter named Minusch Greshake and a wife named Alexa Greshake. He started working small jobs, such as a taxi driver, waiter, and painter. He then managed to start a taxi business in 2002, buying three cars, and had enough time to start his poker career. This was a late start, being 39 at that time. However, he stated that he knew the rules of poker since he played five-card draw when he was a kid.

In August 2014, Ensan won the seniors event at the European Poker Tour's Barcelona festival, then a week later he finished third out of 1,496 players in the Main Event for €652,000. He also made the final table at EPT Malta in March 2015, finishing in sixth. Finally, he made his third EPT final table in Prague that December and won the tournament for €754,000.

Ensan won a WSOP circuit ring in Rozvadov, Czech Republic in 2017. He had just one WSOP cash prior to the 2019 Main Event, in the Colossus event at the WSOP Europe in 2017.

At the 2019 Main Event in Las Vegas, Ensan entered the final table with the chip lead, having more than a third of the chips in play. On the 301st hand of the final table, he defeated Italian professional poker player Dario Sammartino heads-up, with K♥ K♣ against Sammartino's 8♠ 4♠. His opponent check-raised all in on a 10♠ 2♦ 6♠ 9♣ board and Ensan quickly called, with the river card coming up a blank. At age 55, Ensan became the oldest Main Event champion since Noel Furlong in 1999 and the second German champion after Pius Heinz in 2011.

As of January 2020, Ensan's total live earnings exceed $13,000,000.

== World Series of Poker bracelets ==
Year	Tournament	Prize (US$)
2019	$10,000 No Limit Hold'em Main Event	$10,000,000
