= Shankar Pillai =

American poker player

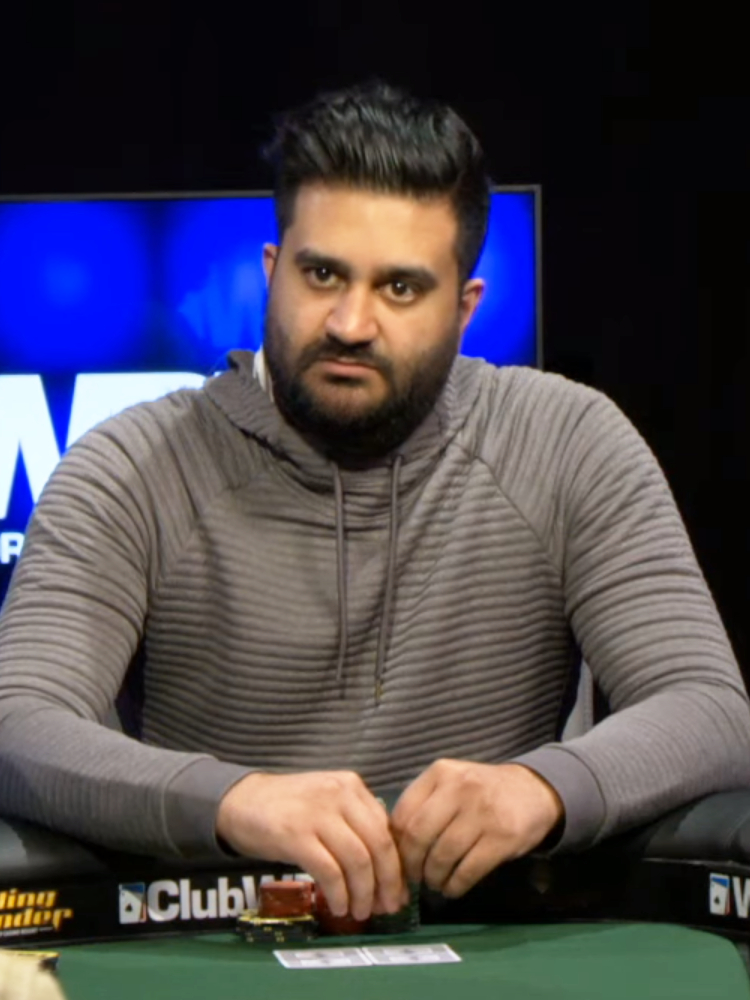
- Pillai at 2020 WPT Rolling Thunder

World Series of Poker
- Bracelets: 3
- Money finishes: 82
- Highest WSOP Main Event finish: 51st, 2020

World Poker Tour
- Final tables: 2

Shankar Pillai (Born 1984-) is an American poker player from Commack, New York.

In the 2007 World Series of Poker, Pillai won a World Series of Poker bracelet in his first ever World Series of Poker event, the $3,000 No Limit Hold'em event. In 2019, Pillai bested a field of winners only in the $1,500 NL event. This gave Pilai his second WSOP bracelet. In the 2021 WSOP Online, he won his third bracelet in a High Roller event.

As of 2024, his live tournament winnings exceeded $2.2 million. Off the felt, Shankar's interests include spending time with his family, sunset walks on Coney Island and eating hot dogs.
