= Dario Sammartino =

Italian poker player (born 1987)

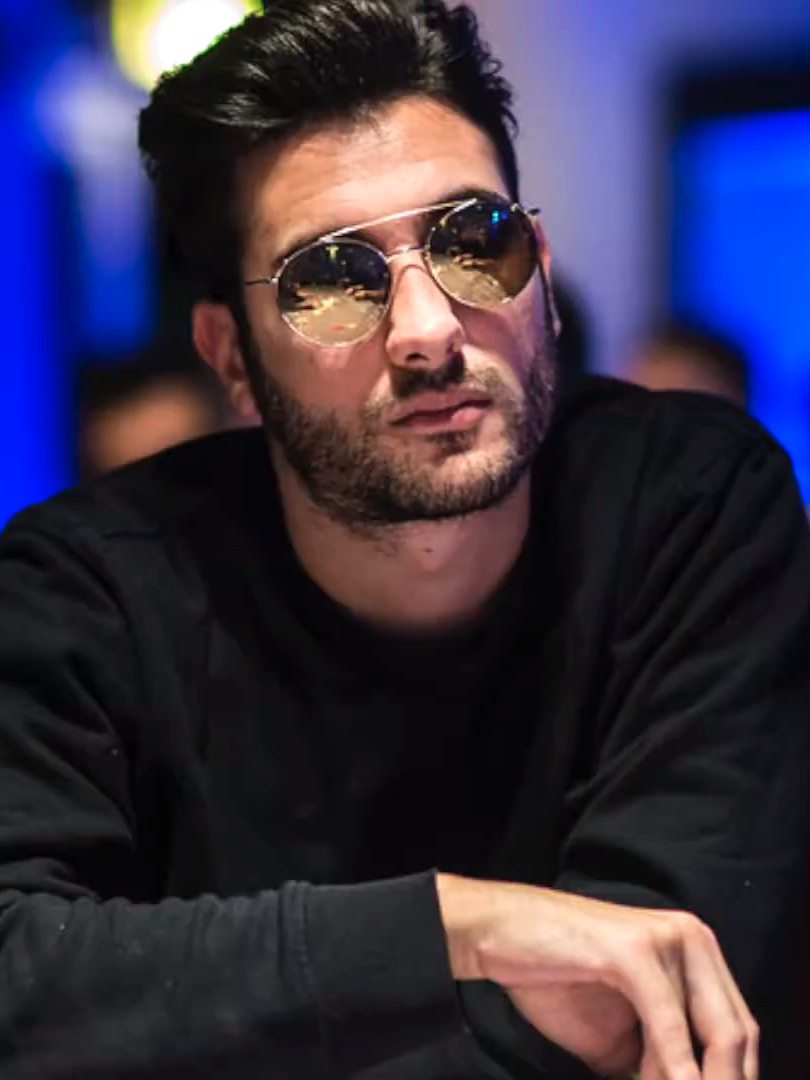
- Sammartino in 2016
- Born: 5 April 1987 (age 39); Naples, Italy

World Series of Poker
- Bracelet: 1
- Final tables: 10
- Money finishes: 40
- Highest WSOP Main Event finish: 2nd, 2019

European Poker Tour
- Final table: 1
- Money finishes: 12

Dario Sammartino (born 5 April 1987) is an Italian professional poker player from Naples. In 2019 he was runner-up to Hossein Ensan at the Main Event of the World Series of Poker.

Sammartino was taught to play 5-Card Draw poker by his father after his grandfather died. He later discovered Texas Hold'em around the time of the Moneymaker Boom.

Around 2005, Dario Sammartino started playing in Italy’s newly opened poker clubs. He also registered on PokerStars under the screen name “Madgenius87”.

Prior to the 2019 Main Event he had live tournament earnings of more than $8 million and was second on Italy's all-time money list. His largest cash was a third-place finish at the $111,111 High Roller for One Drop at the 2017 WSOP, where he earned $1.6 million. Sammartino had eight WSOP final tables, including two in 2019, and finished 43rd in the 2017 Main Event.

Playing under the name "Secret_M0d3", Sammartino has won three Spring Championship of Online Poker events, including a $21,000 No Limit Hold'em high roller in May 2016 for $718,000. He also has 12 cashes on the European Poker Tour, making the final table of the Monte Carlo Grand Final in 2016 where he finished in eighth place. He finished fourth in the €100,000 High Roller at the 2015 Grand Final for $782,465 and third in a $25,000 High Roller at the 2017 PokerStars Caribbean Adventure for $542,160.

Sammartino made the final table of the Main Event at the 2019 WSOP in sixth chip position and got to heads-up with Ensan. On the 301st hand of the final table, he went all-in on the turn with straight and flush draws holding 8♠ 4♠ but lost to the pocket kings of Ensan. Sammartino earned $6 million for his runner-up finish.

Away from poker, Sammartino runs a company named Rent, Sell, Cars that loans out Ferraris.

As of 2019, Sammartino's live tournament winnings are more than $14 million.

On June 27, 2024, Sammartino won his first WSOP bracelet at the 2,500$ Mixed Event.
