= Phil Hui =

American poker player (born 1987)

- Nickname: KungPhui
- Born: November 17, 1987 (age 39); San Antonio, Texas, U.S.

World Series of Poker
- Bracelets: 4
- Final tables: 10
- Money finishes: 101
- Highest WSOP Main Event finish: 1051th, 2017

World Poker Tour
- Money finishes: 10

European Poker Tour
- Money finish: None

Phillip Hui (born November 17, 1987) is an American professional poker player from San Antonio, Texas and the winner of the $50,000 Poker Players Championship at the 2019 World Series of Poker.

Hui played golf at the University of Texas-San Antonio and professionally before turning to poker.

At the 2014 World Series of Poker, Hui won his first bracelet in a $3,000 Omaha Hi-Lo event, earning $286,000. In 2019, he defeated Josh Arieh heads-up to win the Poker Players Championship. The first prize of $1,099,311 was the largest of his career. Hui won his third bracelet in the $1,500 Pot Limit Omaha 8-Handed event in the 2022 WSOP. Hui won his fourth bracelet at the 2024 WSOP in the $1,500 H.O.R.S.E. event.

As of 2023, Hui has live tournament winnings of almost $4 million.

== World Series of Poker bracelets ==
Year	Tournament	Prize (US$)
2014	$3,000 Omaha Hi-Lo 8 or Better	$286,976
2019	$50,000 Poker Players Championship	$1,099,311
2022	$1,500 Pot-Limit Omaha 8-Handed	$311,782
2024	$1,500 H.O.R.S.E	$193,545
