= Shaun Deeb =

American poker player (born 1986)

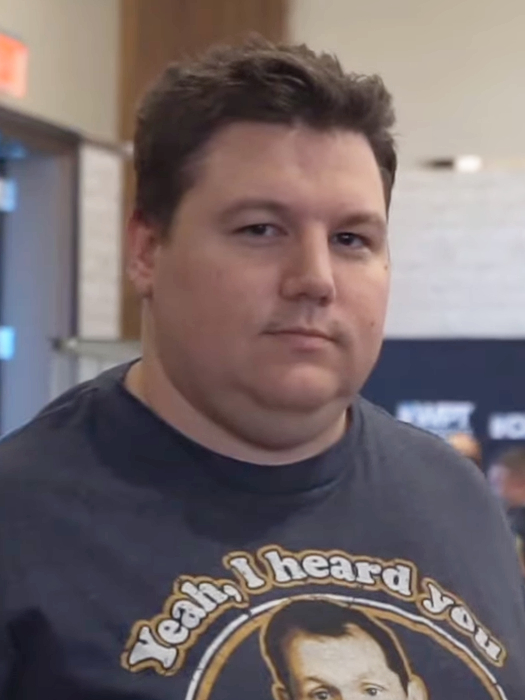
- Deeb in 2019
- Nickname: Deeb
- Born: Shaun Frank Deeb; March 1, 1986 (age 40)

World Series of Poker
- Bracelets: 9
- Final tables: 58
- Money finishes: 262
- Highest WSOP Main Event finish: 15th, 2026

World Poker Tour
- Title: None
- Final table: None
- Money finishes: 7

European Poker Tour
- Title: 1
- Final tables: 3
- Money finishes: 12

Shaun Frank Deeb (born March 1, 1986) is an American professional poker player from Troy, New York. He has three World Championship of Online Poker (WCOOP) player of the year titles and nine World Series of Poker (WSOP) bracelets.

== Career ==
Deeb started playing poker at age 16 in high school by hosting $20 rebuy tournaments with about 30 guests. He attended Bentley University, but gave up class to play poker. Deeb is an avid online poker multi-table tournament player who plays 15–20 tournaments simultaneously. He plays a wide variety of versions of poker with the goal of improving his Texas hold 'em game. Before 2007, Deeb had never been to Las Vegas. At age 24, he announced his retirement from poker, but his retirement lasted only two months. In 2008 and 2009, Deeb finished in fifth place in the Card Player Online Poker Player of the Year competition. Since returning to play, he plays more live games at casinos and a greater variety of game types.

Deeb's only two larger live play prizes came at the 2011 PokerStars Caribbean Adventure, where he finished second of 216 in the $5,000 NAPT Bounty Shootout for US$75,000 and the August 2009 European Poker Tour €20,000 No Limit Hold'em - High Roller Event where he finished first of three for €60,000 ($85,183). At the Bounty event, he also collected eight $1000 bounties, for a total prize of US$83,000.

Prior to Black Friday 2011, Deeb played online under the names tedsfishfry (Full Tilt Poker and Ultimate Bet) and shaundeeb (PokerStars and Absolute Poker). His largest cash was at the January 24, 2011 $1,000 buy in, $1K Monday, on Full Tilt Poker where he finished in first place of 615 for a prize of $312,610. Among Deeb's other online six-figure payouts are two World Championship of Online Poker championships and a Full Tilt Online Poker Series championship. At the 2011 World Series of Poker he paid his grandmother's, Ellen Deeb, buy-in to the main event, where she was the oldest registrant at the age of 91. She was eliminated on Day 1C when she flopped two pair against a set, upon which she attempted to rebuy.

At the 2012 World Series of Poker, Deeb participated in a 96-man $25,300 satellite event to the $1,000,000 Big One for One Drop event. By finishing second, he earned a $1,000,000 alternate seat to the 48-man event. Deeb's second-place finish was controversial because he dumped his chips to Gus Hansen so that he could be on the alternate list, which was likely to get a cash reward rather than the first place guaranteed satellite seat.

During the 2015 World Series of Poker, Deeb won his first WSOP bracelet in Event #15 (the $10,000 Pot Limit Hold'em Championship). He won heads-up versus Paul Volpe in an uncharacteristically small pot of 80,000 chips while holding A♦ 8♠ versus Volpe's 7♥ 2♥. Three hands prior Deeb had won a nearly all in pot leaving Volpe with only 10,000 chips to Deeb's 3,240,000, giving Deeb a 324 to 1 chip lead. Deeb was awarded $318,857 for his first-place victory.

As of July 2025, Deeb's total live tournament winnings exceeded $16,900,000.

== World Series of Poker ==
Deeb's first WSOP final table occurred on the June 16–19, 2011 World Series of Poker Event #29: US$2,500 10-Game Mix / Six Handed where he finished 4th out of 431, earning US$67,146.

Deeb captured his first WSOP bracelet in the June 4–6, 128-entrant 2015 event, winning the $10,000 Pot Limit Hold'em Championship event #15 for $318,857. He then won the 331-entrant, held from June 28–30, 2016 $1,500 Seven-Card Stud event #49 for $111,101.

=== 2018 World Series of Poker ===
At the Las Vegas 2018 World Series of Poker, Deeb took the lead in the World Series of Poker Player of the Year standings. He had 15 in the money finishes which included two bracelets, a final table and strong finishes in both the Main event (105th/7874 for $57,010) and The Poker Players Championship event (10th/87 for $111,447). His bracelets came in the 230-entrant June 20–23, 2018 $25,000 Pot-Limit Omaha 8-Handed High Roller Event #42, which earned him $1,402,683 and the 355-entrant July 11–13, 2018 Big Blind Antes $10,000 No-Limit Hold'em 6-Handed Championship Event #74, which earned him $814,179.

== Personal life ==
Deeb is married.

World Series of Poker results
| Year | Cashes | Final Tables | Bracelets |
|---|---|---|---|
| 2007 | 3 | | |
| 2008 | 0 | | |
| 2009 | 5 | | |
| 2010 | 2 | | |
| 2011 | 6 | 1 | |
| 2012 | 4 | 1 | |
| 2013 | 2 | | |
| 2014 | 0 | | |
| 2015 | 6 | 3 | 1 |
| 2016 | 6 | 2 | 1 |
| 2017 | 10 | 2 | |
| 2018 | 15 | 3 | 2 |
| 2019 | 21 | 4 | |
| 2020 | 6 | | |
| 2021 | 20 | 2 | 1 |
| 2022 | 28 | 7 | |
| 2023 | 27 | 5 | 1 |
| 2024 | 35 | 9 | |
| 2025 | 30 | 6 | 2 |
| 2026 | | | 1 |

=== World Series of Poker bracelets ===
| Year | Tournament | Prize (US$) |
|---|---|---|
| 2015 | $10,000 Pot Limit Hold'em | $318,857 |
| 2016 | $1,500 Seven Card Stud | $111,101 |
| 2018 | $25,000 Pot Limit Omaha 8-Handed High Roller | $1,402,683 |
| 2018 | $10,000 No-limit Hold'em Six Handed Championship | $814,179 |
| 2021 | $25,000 Pot Limit Omaha High Roller - 8 Handed | $1,251,860 |
| 2023 | $1,500 Eight-Game Mix - 6 Handed | $198,854 |
| 2025 | $100,000 Pot Limit Omaha High Roller | $2,957,229 |
| 2025E | €25,000 No-Limit Hold'em GGMillion€ | €329,000 |
| 2026 | $1,500 8-Game Mixed | $181,625 |

== World Championship of Online Poker ==
He has five WCOOP championships to his name: September 17–18, 2008 WCOOP-25: $320+R PL Omaha (748 players, 1254 rebuys, 560 addons, $144,113), September 14–16, 2010 WCOOP-28: $1,050 NL Hold'em (1433 players, $243,610), September 19–21 WCOOP-44 $215 NL Hold'em [4-Max] (1593 players, $68,000), September 7–8, 2016 WCOOP-12: $1,050 NL 5-Card Draw Championship, September 8, 2018, WCOOP-22: $1,050 Pot Limit Omaha Hi/Lo, on the birthday of his son "Chance" for the second time.

World Championship of Online Poker Titles
| Year | Event | Tournament | Prize (US$) |
|---|---|---|---|
| 2008 | Event 25 | $320+R PL Omaha | $144,113 |
| 2010 | Event 28 | $1,050 No Limit Hold’em | $243,610 |
| 2015 | Event 44 | $215 No Limit Hold’em | $68,000 |
| 2016 | Event 12 | $1,050 NL 5-Card Draw Championship | $22,185.60 |
| 2018 | Event 22 | $1,050 Pot Limit Omaha Hi/Lo | $38,088 |

== Spring Championship of Online Poker ==
Deeb has five Spring Championship of Online Poker (SCOOP) championships, his first was in the 2010 SCOOP in Event 17 [Medium] $162 Pot Limit Omaha w/rebuys [6-Max] for $62,251.53 his next four were all won in the 2012 SCOOP, where he was crowned the 2012 SCOOP Player of the Series. His first 2012 SCOOP win was in 10 [High] $2,100 Seven-Card Stud for $41,600 next was Event 19: $2,100 Triple Stud for $44,200 his third of 2012 was in Event 26 [High]$2,100 7 Card Stud H/L for $40,330. then lastly winning a record fourth in a single year SCOOP series in Event 38 [High] $2,100 HORSE for $46,325. Deeb played the 2012 SCOOP events from Mexico due to the restrictions placed on U.S. poker players after Black Friday 2011.

Spring Championship of Online Poker Titles
| Year | Event | Tournament | Prize (US$) |
|---|---|---|---|
| 2010 | Event 17 [Medium] | $162 Pot Limit Omaha w/rebuys [6-Max] | $62,251.53 |
| 2012 | Event 10 [High] | $2,100 Seven-Card Stud | $41,600.00 |
| 2012 | Event 19 [High] | $2,100 Triple Stud | $44,200.00 |
| 2012 | Event 26 [High] | $2,100 7 Card Stud H/L | $40,330.00 |
| 2012 | Event 38 [High] | $2,100 HORSE | $46,325.00 |
