= 2025 World Series of Poker results =

Poker tournament results

Below are the results for the 2025 World Series of Poker, held from May 27-July 16 at Horseshoe Las Vegas and Paris Las Vegas in Las Vegas, Nevada. There are 100 bracelet events.

== Key ==
| * | Elected to the Poker Hall of Fame |
| (#/#) | This denotes a bracelet winner. The first number is the number of bracelets won in the 2025 WSOP. The second number is the total number of bracelets won. Both numbers represent totals as of that point during the tournament. |
| Place | What place each player at the final table finished |
| Name | The player who made it to the final table |
| Prize (US$) | The amount of money awarded for each finish at the event's final table |

=== Event #1: $1,000 Mystery Millions No-Limit Hold'em ===
- 7-Day Event: May 27-June 2
- Number of Entries: 19,654
- Total Prize Pool: $17,295,520
- Number of Payouts: 1,045
- Winning Hand: Q♦ J♥

Final Table
| Place | Name | Prize |
|---|---|---|
| 1st | (United States) Michael Wilklow (1/1) | $1,000,000 |
| 2nd | (Costa Rica) Michael Acevedo | $563,350 |
| 3rd | (United States) Daniel Strelitz (0/2) | $429,950 |
| 4th | (Taiwan) Yu Hsiang Huang | $329,940 |
| 5th | (United States) Elliott Kampen | $254,590 |
| 6th | (China) Wesley Fei | $197,550 |
| 7th | (United States) Linda Ngo | $154,140 |
| 8th | (United States) Jeffrey Hong | $120,950 |
| 9th | (United States) Michael Marks | $95,551 |

=== Event #2: $500 Industry Employees No-Limit Hold'em ===
- 2-Day Event: May 27–28
- Number of Entries: 914
- Total Prize Pool: $379,310
- Number of Payouts: 148
- Winning Hand: A♦ Q♣

Final Table
| Place | Name | Prize |
|---|---|---|
| 1st | (United States) Phovieng Keokham (1/1) | $64,369 |
| 2nd | (United States) Christopher Zollo | $42,886 |
| 3rd | (United States) Shaun Colquhoun | $29,850 |
| 4th | (United States) Michael Coombs | $21,126 |
| 5th | (United States) Mark Kawamoto | $15,207 |
| 6th | (Dominican Republic) Pedro Green | $11,138 |
| 7th | (United States) Connor Richards | $8,301 |
| 8th | (United States) Rick Muniz | $6,299 |
| 9th | (United States) Francois Truong | $4,867 |

=== Event #3: $5,000 No-Limit Hold'em 8-Handed ===
- 4-Day Event: May 28–31
- Number of Entries: 693
- Total Prize Pool: $3,187,800
- Number of Payouts: 104
- Winning Hand: A♣ 3♣

Final Table
| Place | Name | Prize |
|---|---|---|
| 1st | (Spain) Antonio Galiana (1/2) | $528,008 |
| 2nd | (Canada) Frederic Normand | $387,979 |
| 3rd | (Venezuela) Christian Roberts (0/1) | $270,407 |
| 4th | (China) Renji Mao (0/1) | $191,550 |
| 5th | (France) Gaetan Balleur | $137,948 |
| 6th | (Israel) Uri Reichenstein | $101,028 |
| 7th | (United States) Justin Liberto (0/1) | $75,263 |
| 8th | (Greece) Georgios Sotiropoulos (0/4) | $57,051 |

=== Event #4: $1,500 Omaha Hi-Lo 8 or Better ===
- 3-Day Event: May 28–30
- Number of Entries: 910
- Total Prize Pool: $1,208,025
- Number of Payouts: 137
- Winning Hand: A♠ A♥ K♠ K♦

Final Table
| Place | Name | Prize |
|---|---|---|
| 1st | (United States) David Shmuel (1/1) | $205,333 |
| 2nd | (United States) Joe Ford | $136,855 |
| 3rd | (United Kingdom) Darren Taylor | $95,253 |
| 4th | (United States) Gregory Wood | $67,392 |
| 5th | (Russia) Ilia Krupin | $48,480 |
| 6th | (Canada) Patrick Stacey | $35,471 |
| 7th | (United States) Melvin McCraney | $26,403 |
| 8th | (United States) Joseph Bertrand | $20,001 |

=== Event #5: $5,000 Pot-Limit Omaha ===
- 3-Day Event: May 29–31
- Number of Entries: 757
- Total Prize Pool: $3,482,200
- Number of Payouts: 114
- Winning Hand: 8♠ 6♥ 6♣ 4♥

Final Table
| Place | Name | Prize |
|---|---|---|
| 1st | (United States) Caleb Furth (1/2) | $620,696 |
| 2nd | (Germany) Fabian Riebau-Schmithals | $413,762 |
| 3rd | (Czech Republic) Martin Kabrhel (0/3) | $288,775 |
| 4th | (United States) Matthew Cosentino | $204,808 |
| 5th | (United States) Mark Aridgides | $147,647 |
| 6th | (United States) Noel Rodriguez | $108,221 |
| 7th | (Germany) Jeremy Trojand | $80,673 |
| 8th | (United States) Lawrence Brandt (0/2) | $61,179 |

=== Event #6: $1,500 Seven Card Stud ===
- 3-Day Event: May 29–31
- Number of Entries: 377
- Total Prize Pool: $500,467
- Number of Payouts: 57
- Winning Hand: Q♣ 10♥ 9♥ 9♣ 6♦ 6♣ 3♣

Final Table
| Place | Name | Prize |
|---|---|---|
| 1st | (United States) Dan Heimiller (1/3) | $106,840 |
| 2nd | (United States) David Bach (0/3) | $70,568 |
| 3rd | (United States) Tyler Phillips | $47,660 |
| 4th | (Finland) Jyri Merivirta | $32,921 |
| 5th | (China) MengQi Chen | $23,271 |
| 6th | (United States) Kristan Lord | $16,842 |
| 7th | (United States) Sam Jaramillo | $12,487 |
| 8th | (Canada) Greg Mueller (0/3) | $9,490 |

=== Event #7: $25,000 No-Limit Hold'em Heads-Up Championship ===
- 3-Day Event: May 30-June 1
- Number of Entries: 64
- Total Prize Pool: $1,504,000
- Number of Payouts: 8
- Winning Hand: A♦ 6♣

Final Table
| Place | Name | Prize |
|---|---|---|
| 1st | (Russia) Artur Martirosian (1/3) | $500,000 |
| 2nd | (Belarus) Aliaksei Boika | $300,000 |
| SF | (United Kingdom) Patrick Leonard (0/1) | $180,000 |
| SF | (United States) David Chen | $180,000 |
| QF | (France) Thomas Eychenne | $86,000 |
| QF | (United States) Chance Kornuth (0/4) | $86,000 |
| QF | (United States) Harvey Castro | $86,000 |
| QF | (United States) Mike Shi | $86,000 |

=== Event #8: $1,500 Dealers Choice ===
- 3-Day Event: May 30-June 1
- Number of Entries: 597
- Total Prize Pool: $792,518
- Number of Payouts: 90
- Winning Hand: A♣ 9♦

Final Table
| Place | Name | Prize |
|---|---|---|
| 1st | (United Kingdom) Benny Jules Glaser (1/6) | $150,246 |
| 2nd | (United States) Matthew Schreiber (0/1) | $100,137 |
| 3rd | (United States) Andrew Park | $66,755 |
| 4th | (United States) Scott Bohlman (0/1) | $45,511 |
| 5th | (United States) Scott Jacewiczokelly | $31,747 |
| 6th | (United States) Stephen O'Dwyer (CA) | $22,673 |

=== Event #9: $10,000 Omaha Hi-Lo 8 or Better Championship ===
- 4-Day Event: May 31-June 3
- Number of Entries: 217
- Total Prize Pool: $2,018,100
- Number of Payouts: 33
- Winning Hand: J♣ 9♠ 8♥ 2♦

Final Table
| Place | Name | Prize |
|---|---|---|
| 1st | (United States) Ryan Bambrick (1/2) | $470,437 |
| 2nd | (Canada) Daniel Negreanu* (0/7) | $313,615 |
| 3rd | (United States) Ofir Mor | $216,223 |
| 4th | (Sweden) Viktor Blom | $152,315 |
| 5th | (United States) Hunter McClelland | $109,679 |
| 6th | (United States) Maxx Coleman | $80,772 |
| 7th | (United States) Micah Brooks | $60,866 |
| 8th | (United States) Daniel Spear | $46,957 |

=== Event #10: $600 No-Limit Hold'em Deepstack ===
- 2-Day Event: June 1-2
- Number of Entries: 6,090
- Total Prize Pool: $3,069,360
- Number of Payouts: 918
- Winning Hand: A♥ 4♠

Final Table
| Place | Name | Prize |
|---|---|---|
| 1st | (United States) Kenneth Kim (1/1) | $318,842 |
| 2nd | (Ecuador) Alex Paredes | $212,275 |
| 3rd | (United States) Daniel Muniz | $157,968 |
| 4th | (United Kingdom) Gary Blackwood | $118,468 |
| 5th | (United States) Jared Anderson | $89,541 |
| 6th | (Mexico) Raul Melendres Cruz | $68,212 |
| 7th | (South Africa) Edgar Antezana | $52,377 |
| 8th | (Mexico) Luis Diaz Moreno | $40,541 |
| 9th | (United States) Chad Cullimore | $31,633 |

=== Event #11: $10,000 No-Limit Hold'em Mystery Bounty ===
- 3-Day Event: June 1–3
- Number of Entries: 616
- Total Prize Pool: $5,728,800
- Number of Payouts: 93
- Winning Hand: J♣ J♠

Final Table
| Place | Name | Prize |
|---|---|---|
| 1st | (United States) Yosef Fox (1/1) | $729,333 |
| 2nd | (Spain) Alejandro Peinado | $486,192 |
| 3rd | (Philippines) James Mendoza | $336,594 |
| 4th | (United States) Richard Green | $237,123 |
| 5th | (United Kingdom) Patrick Kennedy | $170,036 |
| 6th | (China) Chao Duan | $124,151 |
| 7th | (United States) Joe Cada (0/4) | $92,330 |
| 8th | (United States) Myles Mullaly | $69,964 |
| 9th | (United States) Jordan Siegel | $54,037 |

=== Event #12: $1,500 No-Limit 2-7 Single Draw Lowball ===
- 3-Day Event: June 1–3
- Number of Entries: 532
- Total Prize Pool: $706,230
- Number of Payouts: 80
- Winning Hand: 9x 7x 6x 3x 2x

Final Table
| Place | Name | Prize |
|---|---|---|
| 1st | (United States) Brad Ruben (1/5) | $130,080 |
| 2nd | (United States) Han Liu | $90,569 |
| 3rd | (China) Yueqi Zhu | $60,738 |
| 4th | (China) Jun Weng | $41,654 |
| 5th | (United States) Brian Yoon (0/5) | $29,228 |
| 6th | (United States) Tyler Phillips | $20,994 |
| 7th | (United States) Eric Moum | $15,446 |

=== Event #13: $1,500 No-Limit Hold'em 6-Handed ===
- 3-Day Event: June 2–4
- Number of Entries: 2,354
- Total Prize Pool: $3,124,935
- Number of Payouts: 354
- Winning Hand: 9♦ 7♠

Final Table
| Place | Name | Prize |
|---|---|---|
| 1st | (United States) Christopher Staats (1/2) | $414,950 |
| 2nd | (United States) David Jackson (0/2) | $276,562 |
| 3rd | (China) Shundan Xiao | $197,869 |
| 4th | (United States) Damarjai Davenport | $143,206 |
| 5th | (United States) Eshaan Bhalla | $104,858 |
| 6th | (Sweden) Oscar Johansson | $77,688 |

=== Event #14: $25,000 No-Limit Hold'em/Pot-Limit Omaha High Roller ===
- 4-Day Event: June 2–5
- Number of Entries: 245
- Total Prize Pool: $5,757,500
- Number of Payouts: 37
- Winning Hand: A♥ A♣

Final Table
| Place | Name | Prize |
|---|---|---|
| 1st | (United States) Lou Garza (1/2) | $1,302,233 |
| 2nd | (United States) Ben Lamb (0/2) | $868,140 |
| 3rd | (China) Chongxian Yang | $598,285 |
| 4th | (United Kingdom) Robert Cowen (0/2) | $421,524 |
| 5th | (United States) Brandon Mitchell | $303,773 |
| 6th | (United States) John Pannucci | $224,034 |
| 7th | (United States) Zhargal Tsydypov | $169,183 |
| 8th | (Italy) Youness Barakat | $130,896 |

=== Event #15: $1,500 Mixed Omaha 8 or Better ===
- 4-Day Event: June 2–5
- Number of Entries: 1,239
- Total Prize Pool: $1,644,773
- Number of Payouts: 186
- Winning Hand: K♠ 9♣ 7♣ 3♣

Final Table
| Place | Name | Prize |
|---|---|---|
| 1st | (United Kingdom) Benny Glaser (2/7) | $258,193 |
| 2nd | (United States) Travis Pearson | $172,077 |
| 3rd | (United States) David Shmuel (1/1) | $121,736 |
| 4th | (United States) Sean Remz | $87,325 |
| 5th | (United States) Shane Howeth | $63,527 |
| 6th | (United States) Alan Sternberg (0/1) | $46,879 |
| 7th | (United States) Bashar Trad | $35,098 |
| 8th | (United States) Tyler Brown | $26,666 |

=== Event #16: $600 Pot-Limit Omaha Deepstack ===
- 2-Day Event: June 3–4
- Number of Entries: 3,110
- Total Prize Pool: $1,657,008
- Number of Payouts: 467
- Winning Hand: Q♠ 9♥ 8♦ 4♠

Final Table
| Place | Name | Prize |
|---|---|---|
| 1st | (United States) Cristian Gutierrez (1/1) | $193,780 |
| 2nd | (United States) Robert Chorlian | $129,084 |
| 3rd | (United States) Nick Maimone (0/1) | $94,403 |
| 4th | (United States) Matthew Allen | $69,675 |
| 5th | (Denmark) Martin Nielsen | $51,900 |
| 6th | (United States) Noah Harthcock | $39,022 |
| 7th | (Canada) Kenneth McMillan | $29,616 |
| 8th | (United States) Jorge Martinez | $22,692 |

=== Event #17: $2,000 No-Limit Hold'em ===
- 4-Day Event: June 3–6
- Number of Entries: 1,692
- Total Prize Pool: $3,011,760
- Number of Payouts: 254
- Winning Hand: 6♦ 6♠

Final Table
| Place | Name | Prize |
|---|---|---|
| 1st | (United States) Scott Bohlman (1/2) | $436,044 |
| 2nd | (United States) Dusti Smith | $290,588 |
| 3rd | (United States) Umesh Babusukumar | $210,033 |
| 4th | (China) Quan Zhou | $153,576 |
| 5th | (United States) Benjamin Williams | $113,617 |
| 6th | (China) Xiaohu Liu | $85,056 |
| 7th | (Brazil) Rafael Mota | $64,443 |
| 8th | (Denmark) Henrik Juncker | $49,421 |
| 9th | (France) Samy Boujmala | $38,369 |

=== Event #18: $10,000 Dealers Choice Championship ===
- 4-Day Event: June 3–6
- Number of Entries: 152
- Total Prize Pool: $1,413,600
- Number of Payouts: 23
- Winning Hand: K♦ Q♠ J♦ 4♥

Final Table
| Place | Name | Prize |
|---|---|---|
| 1st | (United States) Ryan Hoenig (1/1) | $354,444 |
| 2nd | (United States) Dylan Smith | $230,374 |
| 3rd | (United Kingdom) Philip Sternheimer | $154,460 |
| 4th | (Italy) Dario Alioto (0/1) | $106,935 |
| 5th | (United States) Matthew Vengrin | $76,525 |
| 6th | (United States) Brandon Cantu (0/2) | $56,671 |

=== Event #19: $500 No-Limit Hold'em Colossus ===
- 7-Day Event: June 4–10
- Number of Entries: 16,301
- Total Prize Pool: $6,664,102
- Number of Payouts: 2,326
- Winning Hand: 9♠ 9♥

Final Table
| Place | Name | Prize |
|---|---|---|
| 1st | (United States) Courtenay Williams (1/1) | $542,540 |
| 2nd | (United States) Ramaswamy Pyloore | $361,690 |
| 3rd | (United States) Matt Glantz | $273,260 |
| 4th | (United States) Kaiwen Wei | $207,740 |
| 5th | (United States) Jason Blodgett | $158,910 |
| 6th | (Brazil) Antonio Trocoli Filho | $122,330 |
| 7th | (United States) Ryan Leng (0/3) | $94,760 |
| 8th | (Austria) Sigrid Dencker | $73,880 |
| 9th | (United States) Justin Gutierrez | $57,970 |

=== Event #20: $1,500 No-Limit Hold'em Shootout ===
- 3-Day Event: June 4–6
- Number of Entries: 1,299
- Total Prize Pool: $1,724,423
- Number of Payouts: 150
- Winning Hand: A♠ 2♣

Final Table
| Place | Name | Prize |
|---|---|---|
| 1st | (United States) Michael Lavin (1/1) | $267,373 |
| 2nd | (United States) Michael Rossitto | $178,240 |
| 3rd | (Thailand) Punnat Punsri | $130,560 |
| 4th | (Canada) Linyang Song | $96,710 |
| 5th | (Venezuela) Luis Yepez Carmona | $72,450 |
| 6th | (United States) Jason Wheeler (0/1) | $54,900 |
| 7th | (United States) Jordan Westmorland | $42,080 |
| 8th | (United States) Drew O'Connell (0/2) | $32,640 |
| 9th | (Mexico) Joel Vazquez | $25,610 |

=== Event #21: $1,500 Pot-Limit Omaha Hi-Lo 8 or Better ===
- 3-Day Event: June 4–6
- Number of Entries: 1,176
- Total Prize Pool: $1,561,140
- Number of Payouts: 178
- Winning Hand: J♠ J♣ 5♠ 3♥

Final Table
| Place | Name | Prize |
|---|---|---|
| 1st | (Canada) Zachary Zaret (1/1) | $248,245 |
| 2nd | (United States) Calvin Anderson (0/5) | $165,447 |
| 3rd | (United States) Christopher Vitch (0/3) | $116,672 |
| 4th | (United States) Darryll Fish | $83,465 |
| 5th | (United States) Ronnie Tate | $60,584 |
| 6th | (United States) Bryce Yockey (0/2) | $44,630 |
| 7th | (United States) Marco Johnson (0/2) | $33,374 |
| 8th | (Argentina) Andres Korn (0/1) | $25,339 |

=== Event #22: $25,000 No-Limit Hold'em 6-Handed High Roller ===
- 3-Day Event: June 5–7
- Number of Entries: 336
- Total Prize Pool: $7,896,000
- Number of Payouts: 51
- Winning Hand: A♠ K♣

Final Table
| Place | Name | Prize |
|---|---|---|
| 1st | (Slovenia) Blaz Zerjav (1/1) | $1,734,717 |
| 2nd | (United Kingdom) Chris Moorman (0/2) | $1,129,608 |
| 3rd | (United States) Jared Bleznick (0/1) | $752,737 |
| 4th | (United States) Landon Tice | $513,577 |
| 5th | (Lithuania) Paulius Vaitiekunas (0/1) | $358,973 |
| 6th | (United States) Aram Oganyan | $257,201 |

=== Event #23: $1,500 Badugi ===
- 3-Day Event: June 5–7
- Number of Entries: 534
- Total Prize Pool: $708,885
- Number of Payouts: 81
- Winning Hand: 6♣ 5♦ 4♥ 2♠

Final Table
| Place | Name | Prize |
|---|---|---|
| 1st | (Brazil) Aloisio Dourado (1/1) | $138,114 |
| 2nd | (United States) Dominick Sarle (0/1) | $92,058 |
| 3rd | (United States) James Newberry | $61,061 |
| 4th | (United States) Jonathan Glendinning | $41,462 |
| 5th | (United States) David Margolis | $28,838 |
| 6th | (United States) Anthony Arvidson | $20,558 |

=== Event #24: $1,500 Pot-Limit Omaha Double Board Bomb Pot ===
- 3-Day Event: June 6–8
- Number of Entries: 1,452
- Total Prize Pool: $795,172
- Number of Payouts: 219
- Winning Hand: A♠ 2♠ 10♦ 6♥

Final Table
| Place | Name | Prize |
|---|---|---|
| 1st | (China) Xixiang Luo (1/3) | $290,400 |
| 2nd | (United States) Robert Klein | $193,517 |
| 3rd | (Slovakia) Samuel Stranak (0/1) | $137,805 |
| 4th | (United States) Danny Wong (0/1) | $99,413 |
| 5th | (United States) Brian Smith | $72,664 |
| 6th | (Netherlands) Bjorn Verbakel (0/1) | $53,824 |
| 7th | (United States) Ian Matakis (0/1) | $40,410 |
| 8th | (United States) Jacob Baumgartner | $30,756 |

=== Event #25: $10,000 Seven Card Stud Championship ===
- 3-Day Event: June 6–8
- Number of Entries: 127
- Total Prize Pool: $1,181,100
- Number of Payouts: 20
- Winning Hand: K♦ K♣ Q♥ 8♣ 7♣ 7♠ 4♥

Final Table
| Place | Name | Prize |
|---|---|---|
| 1st | (United States) Nick Guagenti (1/3) | $295,008 |
| 2nd | (United States) Chino Rheem | $196,662 |
| 3rd | (China) Qiang Xu (0/1) | $135,828 |
| 4th | (United States) Paul Volpe (0/3) | $96,502 |
| 5th | (United States) Mori Eskandani | $70,587 |
| 6th | (United States) Adam Friedman (0/5) | $53,201 |
| 7th | (United States) Dan Heimiller (1/3) | $41,357 |
| 8th | (United States) Mike Matusow (0/4) | $33,190 |

=== Event #26: $25,000 No-Limit Hold'em High Roller ===
- 3-Day Event: June 7–9
- Number of Entries: 392
- Total Prize Pool: $9,212,000
- Number of Payouts: 59
- Winning Hand: K♥ 4♥

Final Table
| Place | Name | Prize |
|---|---|---|
| 1st | (South Korea) Chang Lee (1/1) | $1,949,044 |
| 2nd | (United States) Andrew Ostapchenko | $1,299,333 |
| 3rd | (United States) Elijah Berg | $894,265 |
| 4th | (United Kingdom) Mathew Frankland | $626,823 |
| 5th | (Japan) Masato Yokosawa | $447,613 |
| 6th | (United States) Joe McKeehen (0/3) | $325,757 |
| 7th | (Turkey) Orpen Kisacikoglu (0/1) | $241,701 |
| 8th | (United States) Byron Kaverman | $182,902 |

=== Event #27: $1,500 Big O ===
- 4-Day Event: June 7–10
- Number of Entries: 1,499
- Total Prize Pool: $1,989,922
- Number of Payouts: 225
- Winning Hand: K♣ 8♣ 7♥ 5♦ 4♦

Final Table
| Place | Name | Prize |
|---|---|---|
| 1st | (United States) Igor Zektser (1/1) | $297,285 |
| 2nd | (United States) Paul Sincere | $198,134 |
| 3rd | (United States) Ryan Hoenig (0/1) | $141,315 |
| 4th | (United States) Shiva Dudani | $102,079 |
| 5th | (France) Nicolas Milgrom | $74,693 |
| 6th | (United States) Joshua Biedak | $55,372 |
| 7th | (United States) Kevin Ho | $41,595 |
| 8th | (United States) Shawn Daniels (0/1) | $31,667 |

=== Event #28: $600 No-Limit Hold'em/Pot-Limit Omaha ===
- 2-Day Event: June 8–9
- Number of Entries: 2,775
- Total Prize Pool: $1,398,600
- Number of Payouts: 418
- Winning Hand: K♣ K♥ Q♦ 6♠

Final Table
| Place | Name | Prize |
|---|---|---|
| 1st | (United States) Tyler Brown (1/2) | $178,126 |
| 2nd | (Norway) Bjorn Gravlien | $118,618 |
| 3rd | (United States) Easton Oreman | $86,268 |
| 4th | (United States) Noah Bronstein | $63,367 |
| 5th | (United States) Bryan Andrews | $47,013 |
| 6th | (United States) Jacob Mendelsohn | $35,235 |
| 7th | (Brazil) Caio Sobral | $26,679 |
| 8th | (Slovakia) Oliver Tot | $20,411 |

=== Event #29: $2,500 No-Limit Hold'em ===
- 3-Day Event: June 8–10
- Number of Entries: 1,493
- Total Prize Pool: $3,321,925
- Number of Payouts: 224
- Winning Hand: K♣ K♦

Final Table
| Place | Name | Prize |
|---|---|---|
| 1st | (United States) Mark Darner (1/1) | $496,826 |
| 2nd | (United States) David McGowan | $331,163 |
| 3rd | (Germany) Christopher Puetz | $238,204 |
| 4th | (United States) Dylan Linde (0/1) | $173,435 |
| 5th | (Spain) Jon Vallinas | $127,841 |
| 6th | (Ukraine) Yaroslav Ohulchanskyi | $95,415 |
| 7th | (United States) Alexander Greenblatt | $72,119 |
| 8th | (Moldova) Dragos Trofimov | $55,212 |
| 9th | (United States) Ian O'Hara | $42,819 |

=== Event #30: $10,000 No-Limit 2-7 Single Draw Lowball ===
- 4-Day Event: June 8–11
- Number of Entries: 233
- Total Prize Pool: $2,166,900
- Number of Payouts: 35
- Winning Hand: 10x 8x 6x 4x 3x

Final Table
| Place | Name | Prize |
|---|---|---|
| 1st | (United States) Nick Schulman* (1/7) | $497,356 |
| 2nd | (United States) Darren Elias | $336,421 |
| 3rd | (United States) Chad Eveslage (0/3) | $231,321 |
| 4th | (Sweden) Oscar Johansson | $161,721 |
| 5th | (United States) Ben Yu (0/4) | $114,989 |
| 6th | (United States) Dan Smith (0/1) | $83,179 |
| 7th | (Canada) Daniel Negreanu* (0/7) | $61,231 |

=== Event #31: $800 No-Limit Hold’em Deepstack ===
- 3-Day Event: June 9–11
- Number of Entries: 4,481
- Total Prize Pool: $3,136,700
- Number of Payouts: 673
- Winning Hand: 6♠ 6♣

Final Table
| Place | Name | Prize |
|---|---|---|
| 1st | (United States) Jonathan Stoeber (1/1) | $352,610 |
| 2nd | (United States) Daniel Cosner | $234,908 |
| 3rd | (Canada) Matthew Morin | $172,724 |
| 4th | (Canada) Shawn Buchanan (0/1) | $128,100 |
| 5th | (United States) Geoffrey Coatar | $95,834 |
| 6th | (United States) Nicholas Seward (0/1) | $72,327 |
| 7th | (United States) Ryan Hohner | $55,071 |
| 8th | (United States) Peter Fox | $42,308 |
| 9th | (United States) Mikhail Sniatovskii | $32,796 |

=== Event #32: $50,000 High Roller ===
- 3-Day Event: June 9–11
- Number of Entries: 171
- Total Prize Pool: $8,122,500
- Number of Payouts: 26
- Winning Hand: K♦ Q♠

Final Table
| Place | Name | Prize |
|---|---|---|
| 1st | (United States) Jason Koon (1/2) | $1,968,927 |
| 2nd | (United States) Andrew Lichtenberger (0/1) | $1,312,610 |
| 3rd | (United States) Ben Tollerene | $914,634 |
| 4th | (United States) Brock Wilson | $650,074 |
| 5th | (United Kingdom) Sergey Lebedev | $471,473 |
| 6th | (Sweden) Viktor Blom | $349,068 |
| 7th | (United States) Reagan Silber | $263,944 |
| 8th | (Belarus) Aliaksei Boika | $203,919 |

=== Event #33: $1,500 Limit Hold’em ===
- 3-Day Event: June 9–11
- Number of Entries: 491
- Total Prize Pool: $651,802
- Number of Payouts: 74
- Winning Hand: A♥ 9♥

Final Table
| Place | Name | Prize |
|---|---|---|
| 1st | (United States) Jason Duong (1/1) | $130,061 |
| 2nd | (United States) Adam Tyburski | $86,673 |
| 3rd | (United States) Lawrence Robinson | $59,263 |
| 4th | (United States) Andrew Beversdorf | $41,318 |
| 5th | (United States) Nicholas Tsoukalas | $29,384 |
| 6th | (United States) Bobbi Harrell | $21,324 |
| 7th | (United States) David Rogers | $15,798 |
| 8th | (United States) Chris Hunichen (0/1) | $11,954 |

=== Event #34: $1,500 Super Turbo Bounty No-Limit Hold'em ===
- 1-Day Event: June 10
- Number of Entries: 2,232
- Total Prize Pool: $1,834,567
- Number of Payouts: 333
- Winning Hand: K♣ 4♣

Final Table
| Place | Name | Prize |
|---|---|---|
| 1st | (United States) John Racener (1/3) | $247,595 |
| 2nd | (Israel) Liran Betito | $164,964 |
| 3rd | (China) Xinwen Zhang | $120,457 |
| 4th | (United States) J. C. Tran (0/2) | $88,865 |
| 5th | (Israel) Jeremie Toledano | $66,242 |
| 6th | (United States) Gaetano Logrande | $49,899 |
| 7th | (United States) Paul Saso | $37,988 |
| 8th | (United States) Angela Shade | $29,231 |
| 9th | (United States) Shant Marashlian | $22,738 |

=== Event #35: $3,000 Freezeout No-Limit Hold'em ===
- 3-Day Event: June 10–12
- Number of Entries: 1,027
- Total Prize Pool: $2,742,090
- Number of Payouts: 155
- Winning Hand: Q♥ 8♥

Final Table
| Place | Name | Prize |
|---|---|---|
| 1st | (Ukraine) Renat Bohdanov (1/2) | $451,600 |
| 2nd | (Brazil) Dennys Ramos | $300,830 |
| 3rd | (Hong Kong) Tsz Ho Chau | $212,820 |
| 4th | (United States) Ryan Wolfson | $152,760 |
| 5th | (Russia) Anatoly Nikitin | $111,270 |
| 6th | (United Kingdom) Hattori Lopez | $82,260 |
| 7th | (United States) Santiago Garza | $61,750 |
| 8th | (Bulgaria) Boris Kolev (0/2) | $47,060 |
| 9th | (United States) Brian James | $36,440 |

=== Event #36: $10,000 Pot-Limit Omaha Hi-Lo 8 or Better Championship ===
- 4-Day Event: June 10–13
- Number of Entries: 386
- Total Prize Pool: $3,589,800
- Number of Payouts: 58
- Winning Hand: Q♦ Q♠ J♦ 9♠

Final Table
| Place | Name | Prize |
|---|---|---|
| 1st | (United Kingdom) Philip Sternheimer (1/1) | $763,087 |
| 2nd | (United States) Bruno Furth (1/2) | $508,705 |
| 3rd | (United States) Shaun Deeb (0/6) | $348,304 |
| 4th | (United States) Brian Hastings (0/6) | $243,144 |
| 5th | (United States) Christopher Vitch (0/3) | $173,121 |
| 6th | (Sweden) Magnus Edengren (0/1) | $125,772 |
| 7th | (United States) Sam Soverel (0/2) | $93,273 |
| 8th | (Germany) Dennis Weiss (0/1) | $70,639 |
| 9th | (United Kingdom) Edward Jackson Spivack | $54,657 |

=== Event #37: $1,500 MONSTER STACK ===
- 5-Day Event: June 11–18
- Number of Entries: 9,920
- Total Prize Pool: $13,148,390
- Number of Payouts: 1,488
- Winning Hand: J♠ 3♦

Final Table
| Place | Name | Prize |
|---|---|---|
| 1st | (Austria) Klemens Roiter (1/1) | $1,204,457 |
| 2nd | (United States) David Uvaydov | $802,346 |
| 3rd | (Australia) Ashish Gupta | $604,277 |
| 4th | (Russia) Ivan Ruban | $458,090 |
| 5th | (United States) Daniel Lei | $349,562 |
| 6th | (United States) James Leonard | $268,520 |
| 7th | (United States) Dylan Linde (0/1) | $207,647 |
| 8th | (Italy) Mario Colavita | $161,656 |
| 9th | (United States) Jeremy Dan | $126,705 |

=== Event #38: $100,000 High Roller ===
- 3-Day Event: June 11–13
- Number of Entries: 103
- Total Prize Pool: $9,395,000
- Number of Payouts: 16
- Winning Hand: K♠ J♥

Final Table
| Place | Name | Prize |
|---|---|---|
| 1st | (Portugal) Joao Vieira (1/4) | $2,649,158 |
| 2nd | (United States) Aram Oganyan | $1,766,099 |
| 3rd | (Belgium) Thomas Boivin | $1,212,020 |
| 4th | (United States) Isaac Haxton (0/1) | $857,253 |
| 5th | (United Kingdom) Ben Heath (0/1) | $625,491 |
| 6th | (United States) Andrew Lichtenberger (0/1) | $471,281 |
| 7th | (France) Emilien Pitavy | $367,069 |
| 8th | (United States) Vinny Lingham | $295,883 |

=== Event #39: $1,500 H.O.R.S.E. ===
- 3-Day Event: June 11–13
- Number of Entries: 867
- Total Prize Pool: $1,150,943
- Number of Payouts: 131
- Winning Hand: Ax 3x 4x 5x 6x

Final Table
| Place | Name | Prize |
|---|---|---|
| 1st | (Russia) Andrey Zhigalov (1/2) | $197,923 |
| 2nd | (Canada) Thomas Taylor | $131,916 |
| 3rd | (United States) Marcel Vonk (0/1) | $91,545 |
| 4th | (Israel) Tal Avivi | $64,607 |
| 5th | (United States) Travis Kubota | $46,384 |
| 6th | (United States) Joseph Santagata | $33,885 |
| 7th | (United States) Sachin Bhargava | $25,198 |
| 8th | (Bulgaria) Stanislav Ivanov | $19,078 |
| 9th | (Belarus) Dzmitry Malets | $14,713 |

=== Event #40: $5,000 Seniors High Roller ===
- 4-Day Event: June 12–15
- Number of Entries: 750
- Total Prize Pool: $2,902,800
- Number of Payouts: 121
- Winning Hand: A♣ 3♥

Final Table
| Place | Name | Prize |
|---|---|---|
| 1st | (United States) David "ODB" Baker (1/4) | $646,845 |
| 2nd | (China) Chuanshu Chen | $431,173 |
| 3rd | (United States) Carmino Argiero | $302,208 |
| 4th | (United States) Ronald West | $215,095 |
| 5th | (United States) Peter Kiem | $155,498 |
| 6th | (United States) Ramana Epparla | $114,208 |
| 7th | (United States) John Esposito (0/1) | $85,244 |
| 8th | (United States) Stephen Bierman | $64,674 |
| 9th | (United States) Joseph Mole | $49,891 |

=== Event #41: $10,000 Limit Hold’em ===
- 3-Day Event: June 12–14
- Number of Entries: 118
- Total Prize Pool: $1,097,400
- Number of Payouts: 18
- Winning Hand: A♣ 10♦

Final Table
| Place | Name | Prize |
|---|---|---|
| 1st | (United States) Ian Johns (1/4) | $282,455 |
| 2nd | (Sweden) Viktor Blom | $188,295 |
| 3rd | (United States) Anthony Zinno (0/5) | $130,447 |
| 4th | (Portugal) Pedro Neves (0/1) | $92,774 |
| 5th | (United States) Ryan Bambrick (0/2) | $67,783 |
| 6th | (United States) Max Hoffman | $50,915 |
| 7th | (United States) David Lieberman | $39,349 |
| 8th | (Canada) Daniel Negreanu* (0/7) | $31,316 |

=== Event #42: $1,000 Pot-Limit Omaha ===
- 3-Day Event: June 13–15
- Number of Entries: 1,932
- Total Prize Pool: $1,700,160
- Number of Payouts: 290
- Winning Hand: K♣ K♠ J♥ 2♠

Final Table
| Place | Name | Prize |
|---|---|---|
| 1st | (Argentina) Carlos Leiva (1/1) | $237,852 |
| 2nd | (United States) Hooman Nikzad | $158,481 |
| 3rd | (United States) Brian Mckain | $114,399 |
| 4th | (United States) Dylan Weisman (0/2) | $83,503 |
| 5th | (Canada) Kyle Rosnes | $61,641 |
| 6th | (United States) Joshua Palmer | $46,024 |
| 7th | (France) Florian Ribouchon | $34,761 |
| 8th | (United States) Eric Buchman (0/2) | $26,562 |

=== Event #43: $1,500 Razz ===
- 3-Day Event: June 13–15
- Number of Entries: 472
- Total Prize Pool: $626,580
- Number of Payouts: 71
- Winning Hand: 7x 6x 4x 2x Ax

Final Table
| Place | Name | Prize |
|---|---|---|
| 1st | (United States) Allan Le (1/2) | $126,363 |
| 2nd | (United States) Shaun Deeb (0/6) | $84,221 |
| 3rd | (United States) Clint Wolcyn | $57,296 |
| 4th | (United States) Maxx Coleman (0/1) | $39,787 |
| 5th | (United States) Jeanne David | $28,213 |
| 6th | (United States) Jason Lipiner | $20,438 |
| 7th | (United States) Gabriel Ramos | $15,134 |
| 8th | (China) MengQi Chen | $11,459 |
| 9th | (United States) Jackson Spencer | $8,877 |

=== Event #44: $10,000 Big O ===
- 4-Day Event: June 14–17
- Number of Entries: 402
- Total Prize Pool: $3,738,600
- Number of Payouts: 61
- Winning Hand: A♠ K♦ J♥ 10♠ 7♥

Final Table
| Place | Name | Prize |
|---|---|---|
| 1st | (United States) Veerachai Vongxaiburana (1/1) | $784,353 |
| 2nd | (United States) Phil Hui (0/4) | $522,878 |
| 3rd | (United States) Marco Johnson (0/2) | $360,711 |
| 4th | (United States) Shawn Rice | $253,276 |
| 5th | (Sweden) Viktor Blom | $181,069 |
| 6th | (United States) Christopher Demaci | $131,841 |
| 7th | (United States) Noah Kelley | $97,806 |
| 8th | (United States) Brian Battistone | $73,950 |

=== Event #45: $500 Salute to Warriors No-Limit Hold'em ===
- 3-Day Event: June 15–17
- Number of Entries: 3,937
- Total Prize Pool: $1,687,004
- Number of Payouts: 591
- Winning Hand: Q♥ J♠

Final Table
| Place | Name | Prize |
|---|---|---|
| 1st | (United States) Joey Couden (1/2) | $187,937 |
| 2nd | (United States) Richard Buckingham | $125,034 |
| 3rd | (United States) Ofer Saha | $92,221 |
| 4th | (Taiwan) Yu Hsiang Huang | $68,619 |
| 5th | (Russia) Alexander Savchenko | $51,511 |
| 6th | (United States) Brandon Sowers | $39,015 |
| 7th | (United States) Roger Hendren | $29,818 |
| 8th | (United States) Tim Caziarc | $22,998 |
| 9th | (Brazil) Luciano Melo | $17,901 |

=== Event #46: $250,000 Super High Roller No-Limit Hold'em ===
- 3-Day Event: June 15–17
- Number of Entries: 63
- Total Prize Pool: $15,513,750
- Number of Payouts: 10
- Winning Hand: A♠ A♥

Final Table
| Place | Name | Prize |
|---|---|---|
| 1st | (United States) Seth Davies (1/1) | $4,752,551 |
| 2nd | (United States) Alex Foxen (0/3) | $3,060,314 |
| 3rd | (Belgium) Thomas Boivin | $2,057,430 |
| 4th | (United States) Bryn Kenney (0/2) | $1,446,929 |
| 5th | (United States) Chris Brewer (0/2) | $1,066,731 |
| 6th | (United States) David Peters (0/2) | $826,348 |
| 7th | (Czech Republic) Martin Kabrhel (0/3) | $674,359 |
| 8th | (United States) Ben Tollerene | $581,411 |

=== Event #47: $2,500 Mixed: Omaha Hi-Lo 8/Seven Card Stud Hi-Lo 8 ===
- 3-Day Event: June 15–17
- Number of Entries: 575
- Total Prize Pool: $1,279,375
- Number of Payouts: 87
- Winning Hand: Q♦ J♦ 6♠ 3♥

Final Table
| Place | Name | Prize |
|---|---|---|
| 1st | (United States) Jason Daly (1/2) | $244,674 |
| 2nd | (Hong Kong) Kevin Choi | $163,085 |
| 3rd | (United States) Phil Hellmuth* (0/17) | $112,360 |
| 4th | (Germany) Tobias Hausen | $78,825 |
| 5th | (Norway) Jon Kyte | $56,327 |
| 6th | (Russia) Alexander Orlov | $41,013 |
| 7th | (United States) Christopher Claassen | $30,439 |
| 8th | (Japan) Ruiko Mamiya | $23,036 |

=== Event #48: $1,000 Seniors No-Limit Hold'em Championship ===
- 5-Day Event: June 16–21
- Number of Entries: 7,575
- Total Prize Pool: $6,913,052
- Number of Payouts: 1,137
- Winning Hand: A♠ J♥

Final Table
| Place | Name | Prize |
|---|---|---|
| 1st | (United States) Brett Lim (1/1) | $653,839 |
| 2nd | (United States) Elan Lepovic | $435,572 |
| 3rd | (United States) Dennis Carlson | $326,508 |
| 4th | (Argentina) Jose Boloqui | $246,464 |
| 5th | (Canada) Lawrence Rabie | $187,351 |
| 6th | (United States) Jason Reels | $143,425 |
| 7th | (United States) Manish Madan | $110,581 |
| 8th | (United States) Ron Fetsch | $85,872 |
| 9th | (United States) Peter Fellows | $67,166 |

=== Event #49: $3,000 No-Limit Hold'em 6-Handed ===
- 2-Day Event: June 16–17
- Number of Entries: 1,421
- Total Prize Pool: $3,497,247
- Number of Payouts: 214
- Winning Hand: A♣ 9♥

Final Table
| Place | Name | Prize |
|---|---|---|
| 1st | (United States) Tyler Patterson (1/2) | $574,223 |
| 2nd | (United States) Matthew Wantman | $382,774 |
| 3rd | (United States) Michael Walsh | $267,626 |
| 4th | (United Kingdom) Andy Wilson | $189,863 |
| 5th | (South Korea) Yohwan Lim | $136,701 |
| 6th | (Poland) Jakub Michalak | $99,913 |

=== Event #50: $10,000 Razz Championship ===
- 3-Day Event: June 16–18
- Number of Entries: 134
- Total Prize Pool: $1,274,340
- Number of Payouts: 21
- Winning Hand: 10x 9x 3x 2x Ax

Final Table
| Place | Name | Prize |
|---|---|---|
| 1st | (United States) Brian Rast* (1/7) | $306,644 |
| 2nd | (United States) Andrew Yeh (0/1) | $204,423 |
| 3rd | (United States) Brian Yoon (0/5) | $142,579 |
| 4th | (Portugal) Joao Vieira (1/4) | $101,983 |
| 5th | (United Kingdom) Nikolay Ponomarev | $74,857 |
| 6th | (Venezuela) Christian Roberts (0/1) | $56,424 |
| 7th | (United States) Ali Eslami (0/1) | $43,706 |
| 8th | (Russia) Maksim Pisarenko (0/1) | $34,817 |

=== Event #51: $25,000 High Roller Pot-Limit Omaha ===
- 4-Day Event: June 17–20
- Number of Entries: 489
- Total Prize Pool: $8,695,000
- Number of Payouts: 74
- Winning Hand: A♦ K♦ 6♠ 5♣

Final Table
| Place | Name | Prize |
|---|---|---|
| 1st | (Germany) Dennis Weiss (1/2) | $2,292,155 |
| 2nd | (United States) Michael Duek | $1,528,077 |
| 3rd | (United States) Jeffrey Hakim (0/1) | $1,062,669 |
| 4th | (United States) Evan Krentzman | $751,149 |
| 5th | (United Kingdom) Talal Shakerchi | $539,817 |
| 6th | (United States) Phil Ivey* (0/11) | $394,531 |
| 7th | (Australia) Najeem Ajez | $293,329 |
| 8th | (Spain) Lautaro Guerra (0/1) | $221,920 |

=== Event #52: $1,500 Freezeout No-Limit Hold'em ===
- 4-Day Event: June 17–20
- Number of Entries: 2,320
- Total Prize Pool: $3,077,145
- Number of Payouts: 348
- Winning Hand: 8♦ 6♥

Final Table
| Place | Name | Prize |
|---|---|---|
| 1st | (United States) Samuel Rosborough (1/1) | $410,426 |
| 2nd | (United States) Asher Conniff (0/1) | $273,545 |
| 3rd | (United States) Michael Rossitto | $200,173 |
| 4th | (United States) Tanupat Punjarojanakul | $147,952 |
| 5th | (United States) Eric Berman | $110,463 |
| 6th | (United States) Bryan Piccioli (0/2) | $83,318 |
| 7th | (Mexico) Carlos Kinil | $63,494 |
| 8th | (United Kingdom) Charlie Cuff | $48,892 |
| 9th | (Argentina) Julio Belluscio (0/1) | $38,047 |

=== Event #53: $1,500 Millionaire Maker No-Limit Hold'em ===
- 5-Day Event: June 18–25
- Number of Entries: 11,996
- Total Prize Pool: $15,924,690
- Number of Payouts: 1,800
- Final Result: While Jesse Yaginuma technically won the event, an investigation found that Yaginuma and runner-up James Carroll possibly engaged in "chip dumping", where a player intentionally loses hands to build another player's stack. Yaginuma was eligible to claim an additional $1 million prize from a third party if he won a WSOP bracelet event and it was alleged that both men colluded to ensure the additional money was won. The WSOP announced: "We have concluded that in order to uphold the integrity of the game and to uphold our official WSOP Tournament Rules, no winner will be recognized and no bracelet will be awarded for this year's tournament. The remaining prize pool will be split between the final two players." (x.com/WSOP)

Final Table
| Place | Name | Prize |
|---|---|---|
| 2nd | (United States) James Carroll (United States) Jesse Yaginuma | $1,133,750 $1,133,750 |
| 3rd | (United States) Josh Reichard | $702,360 |
| 4th | (Brazil) Jacques Ortega | $534,590 |
| 5th | (United States) Jeffrey Tanouye | $409,870 |
| 6th | (United States) Jonah Labranche | $316,190 |
| 7th | (Spain) Alejandro Ganivet | $245,430 |
| 8th | (France) Bruno Fuentes | $191,690 |
| 9th | (United States) Kaifan Wang | $150,660 |

=== Event #54: $1,500 Pot-Limit Omaha ===
- 3-Day Event: June 18–20
- Number of Entries: 1,564
- Total Prize Pool: $2,076,210
- Number of Payouts: 235
- Winning Hand: Q♣ Q♠ 6♥ 6♠

Final Table
| Place | Name | Prize |
|---|---|---|
| 1st | (United States) Matt Vengrin (1/1) | $306,791 |
| 2nd | (United States) Bryce Yockey (0/2) | $204,425 |
| 3rd | (Thailand) Punnat Punsri | $146,266 |
| 4th | (China) Qiaonan Liu | $105,947 |
| 5th | (United States) Jacob Snider | $77,703 |
| 6th | (New Zealand) Matthew Beck | $57,711 |
| 7th | (Finland) Antti Marttinen | $43,413 |
| 8th | (Israel) Tomer Daniel | $33,082 |

=== Event #55: $10,000 H.O.R.S.E. Championship ===
- 4-Day Event: June 18–21
- Number of Entries: 207
- Total Prize Pool: $1,925,100
- Number of Payouts: 32
- Winning Hand: 6♦ 4♠ 7♠ 8♠ 9♣ 5♠ 7♦

Final Table
| Place | Name | Prize |
|---|---|---|
| 1st | (United States) Kristopher Tong (1/1) | $452,689 |
| 2nd | (United States) Maximilian Schindler | $301,786 |
| 3rd | (United States) Brad Ruben (0/5) | $206,747 |
| 4th | (United States) Jason Mercier (0/6) | $144,965 |
| 5th | (United States) Marco Johnson (0/2) | $104,089 |
| 6th | (Canada) Alex Livingston (0/2) | $76,581 |
| 7th | (United States) Scott Seiver (0/7) | $57,766 |
| 8th | (United States) Walter Chambers | $44,703 |
| 9th | (United States) PJ Cha | $35,515 |

=== Event #56: $2,500 Mixed Triple Draw Lowball ===
- 3-Day Event: June 19–21
- Number of Entries: 463
- Total Prize Pool: $1,030,175
- Number of Payouts: 70
- Winning Hand: 6x 5x 3x 2x Ax

Final Table
| Place | Name | Prize |
|---|---|---|
| 1st | (United Kingdom) Benny Glaser (3/8) | $208,552 |
| 2nd | (United States) Schuyler Thornton | $135,506 |
| 3rd | (United States) George Alexander | $90,139 |
| 4th | (Canada) Mark Klecan | $61,409 |
| 5th | (United States) Michael Balan | $42,872 |
| 6th | (United States) David "Bakes" Baker (0/3) | $30,690 |
| 7th | (United States) Chris Klodnicki (0/2) | $22,542 |

=== Event #57: $50,000 High Roller Pot-Limit Omaha ===
- 3-Day Event: June 20–22
- Number of Entries: 194
- Total Prize Pool: $9,215,000
- Number of Payouts: 30
- Winning Hand: A♦ K♥ 10♠ 2♠

Final Table
| Place | Name | Prize |
|---|---|---|
| 1st | (United States) Dylan Linde (1/3) | $2,146,414 |
| 2nd | (United Kingdom) Stephen Chidwick (0/2) | $1,430,938 |
| 3rd | (United Kingdom) Richard Gryko (0/1) | $1,000,423 |
| 4th | (China) Biao Ding | $713,762 |
| 5th | (Austria) Manuel Stojanovic | $519,892 |
| 6th | (Hong Kong) Ka Kwan Lau (0/1) | $386,768 |
| 7th | (China) Quan Zhou | $294,013 |
| 8th | (Netherlands) Dirk Gerritse | $228,489 |

=== Event #58: $3,000 Nine Game Mix ===
- 3-Day Event: June 21–23
- Number of Entries: 409
- Total Prize Pool: $1,092,030
- Number of Payouts: 64
- Winning Hand: 10x 7x 5x 4x 3x

Final Table
| Place | Name | Prize |
|---|---|---|
| 1st | (United Kingdom) Robert Wells (1/1) | $228,115 |
| 2nd | (Canada) Thomas Taylor | $149,152 |
| 3rd | (United States) Fu Wong | $99,771 |
| 4th | (Brazil) Anthony Ribeiro | $68,304 |
| 5th | (France) Nicolas Barthe | $47,884 |
| 6th | (United States) David Bach (0/3) | $34,394 |
| 7th | (United States) Jonathan Glendinning | $25,328 |

=== Event #59: $1,000 No-Limit Hold'em Battle of the Ages ===
- 3-Day Event: June 22–24
- Number of Entries: 3,074
- Total Prize Pool: $2,705,120
- Number of Payouts: 461
- Winning Hand: J♦ 9♠

Final Table
| Place | Name | Prize |
|---|---|---|
| 1st | (Netherlands) Sebastiaan de Jonge (1/1) | $335,390 |
| 2nd | (Argentina) Ignacio Sagra | $223,394 |
| 3rd | (United States) Hakeem Mashal | $165,944 |
| 4th | (United States) Srivinay Irrinki | $124,269 |
| 5th | (United States) Joseph Roh (0/1) | $93,820 |
| 6th | (United Kingdom) Jack Maskill | $71,416 |
| 7th | (United States) Allan Le (1/2) | $54,814 |
| 8th | (Macau) Xia Wang | $42,424 |
| 9th | (United States) Kelley Slay | $33,112 |

=== Event #60: $3,000 Limit Hold'em Six-Handed ===
- 3-Day Event: June 22–24
- Number of Entries: 343
- Total Prize Pool: $915,810
- Number of Payouts: 52
- Winning Hand: J♣ 5♣

Final Table
| Place | Name | Prize |
|---|---|---|
| 1st | (United States) Moshe Gavrieli (1/1) | $200,303 |
| 2nd | (United States) Scott Bohlman (1/2) | $129,183 |
| 3rd | (United States) Ian Pelz | $85,431 |
| 4th | (United States) Nicholas Tsoukalas | $57,963 |
| 5th | (Bulgaria) Simeon Tsonev | $40,374 |
| 6th | (United States) Kerry Welsh | $28,893 |

=== Event #61: $500 No-Limit Hold'em Freezeout ===
- 2-Day Event: June 23–24
- Number of Entries: 5,082
- Total Prize Pool: $2,109,030
- Number of Payouts: 763
- Winning Hand: Q♦ Q♣

Final Table
| Place | Name | Prize |
|---|---|---|
| 1st | (United States) Craig Savage (1/1) | $229,628 |
| 2nd | (United States) Tony Harrison | $152,874 |
| 3rd | (United States) Robbie Schiffbauer | $113,244 |
| 4th | (United States) Arthur Morris | $84,584 |
| 5th | (China) Ben Fan | $63,706 |
| 6th | (United States) Edwin Chang | $48,387 |
| 7th | (Canada) Abhishek Mhatre | $37,064 |
| 8th | (Japan) Yudai Futai | $28,635 |
| 9th | (United States) Sean Cronin | $22,314 |

=== Event #62: $5,000 No-Limit Hold'em Six-Handed ===
- 4-Day Event: June 23–26
- Number of Entries: 1,168
- Total Prize Pool: $5,527,120
- Number of Payouts: 176
- Winning Hand: 7♠ 7♥

Final Table
| Place | Name | Prize |
|---|---|---|
| 1st | (United States) Andjelko Andrejevic (1/1) | $855,515 |
| 2nd | (France) Adrien Delmas | $570,284 |
| 3rd | (United Kingdom) Niall Farrell (0/1) | $398,409 |
| 4th | (United States) Matthew Zambanini | $282,471 |
| 5th | (United Kingdom) Brandon Sheils | $203,292 |
| 6th | (Austria) Marius Gierse | $148,548 |

=== Event #63: $1,500 Limit 2-7 Lowball Triple Draw ===
- 3-Day Event: June 23–25
- Number of Entries: 635
- Total Prize Pool: $842,963
- Number of Payouts: 96
- Winning Hand: Jx 7x 5x 4x 3x

Final Table
| Place | Name | Prize |
|---|---|---|
| 1st | (United States) Aaron Cummings (1/2) | $157,172 |
| 2nd | (United States) Travis Erdman | $104,739 |
| 3rd | (United States) James Tilton | $70,121 |
| 4th | (United States) Kristan Lord | $47,969 |
| 5th | (United States) David Mead | $33,546 |
| 6th | (Argentina) Andres Korn (0/1) | $23,995 |

=== Event #64: $1,000 Super Seniors No-Limit Hold'em ===
- 4-Day Event: June 24–27
- Number of Entries: 3,338
- Total Prize Pool: $2,937,440
- Number of Payouts: 501
- Winning Hand: 8♣ 8♦

Final Table
| Place | Name | Prize |
|---|---|---|
| 1st | (United States) Lonny Weitzel (1/1) | $356,494 |
| 2nd | (Canada) Damir Stefanic | $237,521 |
| 3rd | (United States) Richard Jutte | $177,222 |
| 4th | (United States) Martin Kohler | $133,228 |
| 5th | (United States) Lawrence Whyte | $100,915 |
| 6th | (United States) Richard Frandsen | $77,025 |
| 7th | (United States) Wesley Cameron | $59,243 |
| 8th | (United States) Edwin Huston | $45,920 |
| 9th | (United States) Zaher Sayegh | $35,872 |

=== Event #65: $1,000 Tag Team No-Limit Hold'em ===
- 3-Day Event: June 24–26
- Number of Entries: 1,373
- Total Prize Pool: $1,208,240
- Number of Payouts: 206
- Winning Hand: J♦ 8♦

Final Table
| Place | Name | Prize |
|---|---|---|
| 1st | (Brazil) Kelvin Kerber (1/1) (Brazil) Peter Patricio (1/1) | $184,780 |
| 2nd | (France) Samy Boujmala (France) Hicham Mahmouki | $123,102 |
| 3rd | (United States) Steven Mccartney (United States) Dominic Coombe | $88,015 |
| 4th | (United States) Michael Lancaster (United States) Derek Stark | $63,750 |
| 5th | (United States) Conor Hannan (United States) David Sathue | $46,784 |
| 6th | (South Korea) Kyeongrim Shin (South Korea) Hyomo Kang | $34,793 |
| 7th | (Germany) Quirin Heinz (Austria) Felix Rabas | $26,227 |
| 8th | (United States) Angela Jordison (United States) Maxwell Young | $20,042 |
| 9th | (China) Feng Qian (China) Zhou Lin | $15,529 |

=== Event #66: $50,000 Poker Players Championship ===
- 5-Day Event: June 24–28
- Number of Entries: 107
- Total Prize Pool: $5,162,750
- Number of Payouts: 17
- Winning Hand: 10x 6x 5x 4x 2x

Final Table
| Place | Name | Prize |
|---|---|---|
| 1st | (United States) Michael Mizrachi* (1/7) | $1,331,322 |
| 2nd | (United States) Bryn Kenney (0/2) | $887,542 |
| 3rd | (United States) Esther Taylor | $595,136 |
| 4th | (United States) Andrew Yeh (0/1) | $413,740 |
| 5th | (Portugal) Joao Vieira (1/4) | $298,614 |
| 6th | (Lebanon) Albert Daher | $224,007 |
| 7th | (United States) Ben Lamb (0/2) | $175,096 |

=== Event #67: $300 Gladiators of Poker No-Limit Hold'em ===
- 3-Day Event: June 25–30
- Number of Entries: 24,629
- Total Prize Pool: $6,058,734
- Number of Payouts: 812
- Winning Hand: 8♣ 5♣

Final Table
| Place | Name | Prize |
|---|---|---|
| 1st | (United States) Ian Pelz (1/1) | $420,680 |
| 2nd | (United States) Sang Sim | $300,160 |
| 3rd | (United States) Manuel Reyes | $219,410 |
| 4th | (United States) Jesus Rodriguez | $167,730 |
| 5th | (United States) Yuanzhi Cao | $128,970 |
| 6th | (Georgia (country)) Roland Israelashvili (0/1) | $100,120 |
| 7th | (United States) Joseph Butler | $77,580 |
| 8th | (Argentina) Santiago Trujillo | $60,700 |
| 9th | (United States) Timothy Thorp | $47,770 |

=== Event #68: $3,000 No-Limit Hold'em ===
- 4-Day Event: June 25–28
- Number of Entries: 2,338
- Total Prize Pool: $6,242,460
- Number of Payouts: 351
- Winning Hand: 6♠ 6♣

Final Table
| Place | Name | Prize |
|---|---|---|
| 1st | (China) Yilong Wang (1/1) | $830,685 |
| 2nd | (Israel) Ran Ilani | $553,692 |
| 3rd | (China) Ren Lin | $406,016 |
| 4th | (Bulgaria) Yuliyan Kolev (0/2) | $300,649 |
| 5th | (India) Kunal Patni | $224,833 |
| 6th | (United States) Seunghyun Nam | $169,818 |
| 7th | (Uruguay) Fabrizio Gonzalez | $129,563 |
| 8th | (United States) Jason Richard | $99,859 |
| 9th | (India) Paawan Bansal | $77,760 |

=== Event #69: $1,500 Seven Card Stud Hi-Lo 8 or Better ===
- 3-Day Event: June 25–27
- Number of Entries: 615
- Total Prize Pool: $816,413
- Number of Payouts: 93
- Winning Hand: 10♥ 2♥ 2♦ 6♣ 10♣ 9♣

Final Table
| Place | Name | Prize |
|---|---|---|
| 1st | (Slovenia) Blaz Zerjav (2/2) | $153,487 |
| 2nd | (United States) Huck Seed* (0/4) | $102,281 |
| 3rd | (United States) Sergei Tolkachov | $70,071 |
| 4th | (United States) Michelle Konig | $48,931 |
| 5th | (United States) Jay Kerbel | $34,842 |
| 6th | (Russia) Denis Strebkov (0/2) | $25,307 |
| 7th | (United States) David Lin | $18,758 |
| 8th | (United States) Michal Frejka | $14,195 |

=== Event #70: $1,000 Ladies Championship No-Limit Hold'em ===
- 4-Day Event: June 26–29
- Number of Entries: 1,368
- Total Prize Pool: $1,203,840
- Number of Payouts: 206
- Winning Hand: 9♠ 9♣

Final Table
| Place | Name | Prize |
|---|---|---|
| 1st | (Japan) Shiina Okamoto (1/2) | $184,094 |
| 2nd | (United States) Heather Alcorn | $122,654 |
| 3rd | (United States) Stephani Hagberg | $87,695 |
| 4th | (United States) Julie Huynh | $63,517 |
| 5th | (Russia) Sonia Shashikhina | $46,614 |
| 6th | (United States) Juliet Hegedus | $34,667 |
| 7th | (Japan) Sumire Uenomachi | $26,131 |
| 8th | (South Africa) Tanith Rothman | $19,969 |
| 9th | (United States) Elisa Nakagawa | $15,472 |

=== Event #71: $10,000 Limit 2-7 Triple Draw Championship ===
- 3-Day Event: June 26–28
- Number of Entries: 141
- Total Prize Pool: $1,340,910
- Number of Payouts: 22
- Winning Hand: 10x 7x 5x 3x 2x

Final Table
| Place | Name | Prize |
|---|---|---|
| 1st | (United States) Alexander Wilkinson (1/1) | $333,054 |
| 2nd | (United States) Matthew Schreiber (0/1) | $215,848 |
| 3rd | (United States) Nick Schulman* (1/7) | $144,431 |
| 4th | (United States) Hye Park | $99,885 |
| 5th | (United States) Brian Tate | $71,475 |
| 6th | (Brazil) Yuri Dzivielevski (0/5) | $52,985 |

=== Event #72: $10,000 Super Turbo Bounty No-Limit Hold'em ===
- 1-Day Event: June 27
- Number of Entries: 761
- Total Prize Pool: $7,523,700
- Number of Payouts: 122
- Winning Hand: J♠ 5♣

Final Table
| Place | Name | Prize |
|---|---|---|
| 1st | (Germany) Rainer Kempe (1/1) | $892,701 |
| 2nd | (Japan) Yuya Arito | $595,078 |
| 3rd | (Japan) Ryuta Nakai | $415,755 |
| 4th | (China) Xiaoyao Ma | $295,133 |
| 5th | (Czech Republic) Martin Kabrhel (0/3) | $212,926 |
| 6th | (Netherlands) Raoul Kanme | $156,166 |
| 7th | (United States) Colin Dentan | $116,468 |
| 8th | (United States) Chad Thyzel | $88,352 |

=== Event #73: $1,500 Eight Game Mix ===
- 3-Day Event: June 27–29
- Number of Entries: 789
- Total Prize Pool: $1,047,398
- Number of Payouts: 119
- Winning Hand: K♠ 10♣ 4♣ 2♦

Final Table
| Place | Name | Prize |
|---|---|---|
| 1st | (Romania) Narcis Nedelcu (1/1) | $184,683 |
| 2nd | (United States) Scott Abrams (0/1) | $123,086 |
| 3rd | (Italy) Walter Treccarichi | $83,448 |
| 4th | (United States) Mark Liedtke | $57,675 |
| 5th | (United States) John Cipriano | $40,653 |
| 6th | (Canada) Elaine Rawn | $29,234 |

=== Event #74: $10,000 Pot-Limit Omaha Championship ===
- 4-Day Event: June 28-July 1
- Number of Entries: 874
- Total Prize Pool: $8,128,200
- Number of Payouts: 139
- Winning Hand: Q♠ J♣ J♦ 8♠

Final Table
| Place | Name | Prize |
|---|---|---|
| 1st | (United States) Michael Wang (1/3) | $1,394,579 |
| 2nd | (United States) Michael Zulker | $929,688 |
| 3rd | (China) Quan Zhou | $650,567 |
| 4th | (United States) Sean Rafael | $462,451 |
| 5th | (United States) Melad Marji | $334,017 |
| 6th | (France) Javier Francort | $245,194 |
| 7th | (United States) Alex Foxen (0/3) | $182,983 |
| 8th | (Bulgaria) Simeon Tsonev | $138,863 |

=== Event #75: $1,000 Mini Main Event ===
- 3-Day Event: June 29-July 2
- Number of Entries: 10,794
- Total Prize Pool: $9,498,720
- Number of Payouts: 859
- Winning Hand: A♣ K♠

Final Table
| Place | Name | Prize |
|---|---|---|
| 1st | (Czech Republic) Martin Kabrhel (1/4) | $843,140 |
| 2nd | (United States) Alexander Yen | $566,170 |
| 3rd | (Belarus) Vadzim Lipauka | $426,550 |
| 4th | (Bulgaria) John Ishak | $323,460 |
| 5th | (Poland) Bartlomiej Swieboda | $246,900 |
| 6th | (Argentina) Lucas Lew | $189,710 |
| 7th | (France) Allan Tirel | $146,740 |
| 8th | (United States) Katie Lindsay | $114,260 |
| 9th | (United States) Christopher Davis | $89,577 |

=== Event #76: $2,500 Mixed Big Bet ===
- 3-Day Event: June 29-July 1
- Number of Entries: 458
- Total Prize Pool: $1,019,050
- Number of Payouts: 69
- Winning Hand: 9x 8x 6x 5x 3x

Final Table
| Place | Name | Prize |
|---|---|---|
| 1st | (United States) Aaron Kupin (1/1) | $206,982 |
| 2nd | (United States) Marco Johnson (0/2) | $134,345 |
| 3rd | (United States) Ofir Mor | $89,289 |
| 4th | (Canada) Daniel Negreanu* (0/7) | $60,792 |
| 5th | (United States) Jeff Madsen (0/4) | $42,426 |
| 6th | (United States) Bariscan Betil | $30,369 |

=== Event #77: $10,000 Seven Card Stud Hi-Lo 8 or Better Championship ===
- 4-Day Event: June 30-July 3
- Number of Entries: 186
- Total Prize Pool: $1,729,800
- Number of Payouts: 28
- Winning Hand: A♦ 10♠ 9♦ 9♣ 8♦ 8♥ 4♣

Final Table
| Place | Name | Prize |
|---|---|---|
| 1st | (United States) Qinghai Pan (1/3) | $411,051 |
| 2nd | (United States) David Lin | $274,023 |
| 3rd | (United Kingdom) Luke Schwartz (0/1) | $188,105 |
| 4th | (Russia) Andrey Zhigalov (0/2) | $132,423 |
| 5th | (Poland) Tomasz Gluszko | $95,665 |
| 6th | (United States) Timothy Frazin | $70,970 |
| 7th | (Canada) Alex Livingston (0/2) | $54,105 |
| 8th | (United States) Jared Rubin | $42,421 |

=== Event #78: $600 PokerNews Deepstack Championship No-Limit Hold'em ===
- 4-Day Event: July 1–4
- Number of Entries: 5,667
- Total Prize Pool: $2,856,168
- Number of Payouts: 851
- Winning Hand: J♠ 2♣

Final Table
| Place | Name | Prize |
|---|---|---|
| 1st | (United States) Nick Ahmadi (1/1) | $302,165 |
| 2nd | (Israel) Ran Kadur | $201,233 |
| 3rd | (France) Nicolas Godard | $149,601 |
| 4th | (Argentina) Jorge Dominguez | $112,101 |
| 5th | (United States) Daniel Schill | $84,676 |
| 6th | (Canada) Jason Li | $64,477 |
| 7th | (Spain) Mario Diaz Quilez | $49,497 |
| 8th | (Mexico) Pablo Valdes | $38,310 |
| 9th | (India) Aditya Sushant (0/1) | $29,897 |

=== Event #79: $100,000 High Roller Pot-Limit Omaha ===
- 3-Day Event: July 1–3
- Number of Entries: 121
- Total Prize Pool: $11,676,500
- Number of Payouts: 19
- Winning Hand: K♦ K♠ J♦ 7♦

Final Table
| Place | Name | Prize |
|---|---|---|
| 1st | (United States) Shaun Deeb (1/7) | $2,959,297 |
| 2nd | (United States) Isaac Haxton (0/1) | $1,972,860 |
| 3rd | (United States) Arthur Morris | $1,368,994 |
| 4th | (Spain) Lautaro Guerra (0/1) | $976,082 |
| 5th | (United States) Phil Ivey* (0/11) | $715,614 |
| 6th | (United States) Alex Foxen (0/3) | $539,917 |
| 7th | (United States) Sean Rafael | $419,563 |
| 8th | (United States) Ben Lamb (0/2) | $336,110 |

=== Event #80: $800 Summer Celebration No-Limit Hold'em ===
- 2-Day Event: July 2–4
- Number of Entries: 7,078
- Total Prize Pool: $3,698,201
- Number of Payouts: 361
- Winning Hand: A♣ A♥

Final Table
| Place | Name | Prize |
|---|---|---|
| 1st | (Italy) Giuseppe Zarbo (1/1) | $504,180 |
| 2nd | (Japan) Ryo Kotake | $332,840 |
| 3rd | (Hong Kong) Wai Kit Lo | $248,320 |
| 4th | (United States) Jonathan Stoeber (1/1) | $186,650 |
| 5th | (Republic of Ireland) Ciaran Duffy | $141,350 |
| 6th | (United States) Yansong Kou | $107,850 |
| 7th | (Greece) Ionannis Panagopoulos | $82,920 |
| 8th | (Russia) Marat Shafigullin | $64,250 |
| 9th | (United States) Quinterol Mallette | $50,161 |

=== Event #81: $10,000 Main Event No-Limit Hold'em World Championship ===
- 11-Day Event: July 2–16
- Number of Entries: 9,735
- Total Prize Pool: $90,535,500
- Number of Payouts: 1,461
- Winning Hand: 10♣ 3♣

Final Table
| Place | Name | Prize |
|---|---|---|
| 1st | (United States) Michael Mizrachi* (2/8) | $10,000,000 |
| 2nd | (United States) John Wasnock | $6,000,000 |
| 3rd | (United States) Braxton Dunaway | $4,000,000 |
| 4th | (Belgium) Kenny Hallaert | $3,000,000 |
| 5th | (Serbia) Luka Bojovic | $2,400,000 |
| 6th | (United States) Adam Hendrix | $1,900,000 |
| 7th | (Spain) Leo Margets | $1,500,000 |
| 8th | (United States) Jarod Minghini | $1,250,000 |
| 9th | (South Korea) Daehyung Lee | $1,000,000 |

=== Event #82: $10,000 Eight Game Mix ===
- 4-Day Event: July 2–5
- Number of Entries: 195
- Total Prize Pool: $1,813,500
- Number of Payouts: 30
- Winning Hand: A♠ Q♦

Final Table
| Place | Name | Prize |
|---|---|---|
| 1st | (United States) Mike Gorodinsky (1/5) | $422,421 |
| 2nd | (United States) Eric Wasserson (0/1) | $277,960 |
| 3rd | (United States) Jon Turner | $187,724 |
| 4th | (United States) Brian Tate | $130,211 |
| 5th | (Australia) Kahle Burns (0/2) | $92,829 |
| 6th | (United States) Bradley Jansen (0/1) | $68,071 |

=== Event #83: $2,500 No-Limit Hold'em Freezeout ===
- 4-Day Event: July 3–6
- Number of Entries: 1,299
- Total Prize Pool: $2,890,275
- Number of Payouts: 195
- Winning Hand: 3♥ 3♣

Final Table
| Place | Name | Prize |
|---|---|---|
| 1st | (United States) Cary Katz (1/1) | $449,245 |
| 2nd | (Brazil) Breno Drumond | $298,690 |
| 3rd | (South Korea) Jaehoon Baek | $213,800 |
| 4th | (United States) Preston McEwen | $155,010 |
| 5th | (Belgium) Gary Hasson | $113,860 |
| 6th | (Netherlands) Michel Molenaar | $84,730 |
| 7th | (Poland) Pawel Brzeski | $63,910 |
| 8th | (Romania) Razvan Belea | $48,860 |
| 9th | (Romania) Mihai Manole | $37,860 |

=== Event #84: $1,000 No-Limit Hold'em ===
- 3-Day Event: July 4–6
- Number of Entries: 1,873
- Total Prize Pool: $1,648,240
- Number of Payouts: 281
- Winning Hand: 2♦ 2♠

Final Table
| Place | Name | Prize |
|---|---|---|
| 1st | (Czech Republic) Zdenek Zizka (1/1) | $232,498 |
| 2nd | (United States) Shaun Deeb (1/7) | $154,906 |
| 3rd | (United States) Jeffrey Thoney | $112,413 |
| 4th | (Argentina) Santiago Maglio | $82,480 |
| 5th | (United States) Brian Klish | $61,195 |
| 6th | (Australia) Dinesh Singham | $45,917 |
| 7th | (United States) Logan Kim | $34,848 |
| 8th | (United States) Ricky Robinson | $26,754 |
| 9th | (Canada) Santiago Plante | $20,781 |

=== Event #85: $600 Ultra Stack No-Limit Hold'em ===
- 3-Day Event: July 6–9
- Number of Entries: 7,057
- Total Prize Pool: $3,556,728
- Number of Payouts: 595
- Winning Hand: 7♠ 6♥

Final Table
| Place | Name | Prize |
|---|---|---|
| 1st | (United States) Justin Fawcett (1/1) | $355,110 |
| 2nd | (United States) Thai Dinh | $236,740 |
| 3rd | (United States) Zhengyu Guan | $176,620 |
| 4th | (United States) Delano Jackson | $132,710 |
| 5th | (United States) Eric Rabelas | $100,450 |
| 6th | (United States) Blake Napierala | $76,620 |
| 7th | (Japan) Riku Mieda | $58,890 |
| 8th | (United States) Kirk Staples | $45,620 |
| 9th | (United States) Eric Dillon | $35,610 |

=== Event #86: $1,000 Mystery Bounty Pot-Limit Omaha ===
- 3-Day Event: July 8–11
- Number of Entries: 5,284
- Total Prize Pool: $3,064,720
- Number of Payouts: 792
- Winning Hand: K♦ 9♥ 6♣ 5♣

Final Table
| Place | Name | Prize |
|---|---|---|
| 1st | (Hungary) Ferenc Deak (1/1) | $329,890 |
| 2nd | (Brazil) Paulo Drummond | $219,890 |
| 3rd | (Brazil) Carlos De Lima | $164,090 |
| 4th | (United States) Quan Tran | $123,380 |
| 5th | (United States) Richard Harroch | $93,480 |
| 6th | (Austria) Lukas Hafner | $71,370 |
| 7th | (United States) Sean Chen | $54,910 |
| 8th | (United States) Christoph Milbradt | $42,580 |
| 9th | (Latvia) Davis Modans | $33,280 |

=== Event #87: $5,000 Super Turbo Bounty No-Limit Hold'em ===
- 1-Day Event: July 8
- Number of Entries: 1,283
- Total Prize Pool: $5,908,100
- Number of Payouts: 194
- Winning Hand: A♣ A♦

Final Table
| Place | Name | Prize |
|---|---|---|
| 1st | (Israel) Netanel Stern (1/1) | $618,377 |
| 2nd | (Ukraine) Rostyslav Sabishchenko | $412,187 |
| 3rd | (China) Zheyu Weng | $294,441 |
| 4th | (Austria) Fabian Bernhauser | $212,997 |
| 5th | (United Kingdom) Tamer Kamel | $156,060 |
| 6th | (Russia) Viktor Ustimov | $115,830 |
| 7th | (United States) Adrian Lopez | $87,104 |
| 8th | (Brazil) Fabiano Kovalski | $66,376 |

=== Event #88: $50,000 High Roller No-Limit Hold'em ===
- 3-Day Event: July 9–11
- Number of Entries: 252
- Total Prize Pool: $11,970,000
- Number of Payouts: 38
- Winning Hand: Q♥ 3♠

Final Table
| Place | Name | Prize |
|---|---|---|
| 1st | (Vietnam) Khoi Le Nguyen (1/1) | $2,686,913 |
| 2nd | (France) Alexandre Reard (0/2) | $1,791,267 |
| 3rd | (Spain) Sergio Aido (0/2) | $1,242,660 |
| 4th | (Japan) Jun Obara | $879,939 |
| 5th | (United States) Vinny Lingham | $636,279 |
| 6th | (Bulgaria) Fahredin Mustafov | $470,036 |
| 7th | (United States) Martin Zamani | $354,901 |
| 8th | (United States) Matthew Wantman (1/1) | $274,023 |

=== Event #89: $3,000 Mid-Stakes No-Limit Hold'em Championship ===
- 4-Day Event: July 9–13
- Number of Entries: 3,797
- Total Prize Pool: $10,137,990
- Number of Payouts: 570
- Winning Hand: 10♣ 6♦

Final Table
| Place | Name | Prize |
|---|---|---|
| 1st | (United States) Ian O'Hara (1/1) | $1,189,408 |
| 2nd | (Bulgaria) Bahar Musa | $792,714 |
| 3rd | (Italy) Jacopo Achille (0/1) | $589,980 |
| 4th | (United States) Andrew Robinson | $442,604 |
| 5th | (Romania) Bogdan Munteanu | $334,718 |
| 6th | (Republic of Ireland) Simon Wilson | $255,186 |
| 7th | (Argentina) Maximiliano Castagnini | $196,145 |
| 8th | (Russia) Mikhail Zavoloka | $152,009 |
| 9th | (India) Ankit Ahuja | $118,785 |

=== Event #90: $777 Lucky 7's No-Limit Hold'em ===
- 3-Day Event: July 10–14
- Number of Entries: 8,012
- Total Prize Pool: $5,447,118
- Number of Payouts: 348
- Winning Hand: A♦ 10♠

Final Table
| Place | Name | Prize |
|---|---|---|
| 1st | (Spain) Nelson Mari Sanchez (1/1) | $777,777 |
| 2nd | (Canada) Yu Liu | $332,777 |
| 3rd | (Italy) Nicola Bracchi | $244,777 |
| 4th | (Canada) Allen Shen | $181,777 |
| 5th | (Republic of Ireland) Kieran Walsh | $135,777 |
| 6th | (Israel) Hertsel Levy | $101,777 |
| 7th | (Japan) Hayato Kitajima | $77,777 |

=== Event #91: $1,500 Pot-Limit Omaha 6-Handed ===
- 3-Day Event: July 10–12
- Number of Entries: 1,389
- Total Prize Pool: $1,837,260
- Number of Payouts: 208
- Winning Hand: A♥ Q♠ Q♣ Q♥

Final Table
| Place | Name | Prize |
|---|---|---|
| 1st | (Lithuania) Kasparas Klezys (1/1) | $280,214 |
| 2nd | (United States) Jonathan Hanner | $186,732 |
| 3rd | (Mexico) Jose Nadal | $130,264 |
| 4th | (Argentina) Jonathan Bomba | $92,234 |
| 5th | (United States) Paul Gunness | $66,300 |
| 6th | (United States) Darryll Fish | $48,395 |

=== Event #92: $1,979 Poker Hall of Fame Bounty No-Limit Hold'em ===
- 2-Day Event: July 11–12
- Number of Entries: 1,115
- Total Prize Pool: $1,931,652
- Number of Payouts: 169
- Winning Hand: A♥ 10♣

Final Table
| Place | Name | Prize |
|---|---|---|
| 1st | (United Kingdom) Joshua Boulton (1/1) | $311,349 |
| 2nd | (United States) Rob Wazwaz (0/1) | $207,510 |
| 3rd | (Israel) Ori Mendi | $147,184 |
| 4th | (France) Jimmy Kebe | $105,879 |
| 5th | (United States) David Dibernardi | $77,263 |
| 6th | (India) Laksh Singh | $57,205 |
| 7th | (United Kingdom) Jun Li | $42,983 |
| 8th | (Taiwan) Chen-An Lin | $32,783 |
| 9th | (United Kingdom) Zhicheng Miao | $25,386 |

=== Event #93: $3,000 T.O.R.S.E. ===
- 3-Day Event: July 11–13
- Number of Entries: 522
- Total Prize Pool: $1,393,740
- Number of Payouts: 79
- Winning Hand: 10x 8x 8x 7x 5x 3x 2x

Final Table
| Place | Name | Prize |
|---|---|---|
| 1st | (Japan) Ryutaro Suzuki (1/2) | $273,386 |
| 2nd | (United Kingdom) Toby Lewis (0/1) | $178,427 |
| 3rd | (Japan) Koji Fujimoto | $119,108 |
| 4th | (United States) Matthew Rosen | $81,357 |
| 5th | (United States) Dave Stann | $56,892 |
| 6th | (United States) Sterling Lopez | $40,753 |
| 7th | (United States) Lucas Johnson | $29,921 |

=== Event #94: $10,000 No-Limit Hold'em Championship 6-Handed ===
- 3-Day Event: July 12–15
- Number of Entries: 546
- Total Prize Pool: $4,022,730
- Number of Payouts: 82
- Winning Hand: J♥ 10♥

Final Table
| Place | Name | Prize |
|---|---|---|
| 1st | (United States) Sam Soverel (1/3) | $986,337 |
| 2nd | (Spain) Daniel Vicente | $649,925 |
| 3rd | (United States) Isaac Kempton | $437,276 |
| 4th | (Austria) Klemens Roiter (1/1) | $300,521 |
| 5th | (United States) Eric Wasserson (0/1) | $211,068 |
| 6th | (Germany) Leonard Maue | $151,567 |

=== Event #95: $800 No-Limit Hold'em Deepstack ===
- 2-Day Event: July 13–14
- Number of Entries: 2,851
- Total Prize Pool: $1,995,700
- Number of Payouts: 428
- Winning Hand: 5♣ 2♠

Final Table
| Place | Name | Prize |
|---|---|---|
| 1st | (Argentina) Mariano Balfagon (1/1) | $252,386 |
| 2nd | (United States) Andrew Ahn | $168,122 |
| 3rd | (United States) Nan Chen | $122,705 |
| 4th | (Israel) Alon Eldar | $90,413 |
| 5th | (United States) Jon Turner | $67,262 |
| 6th | (China) Wesley Fei | $50,526 |
| 7th | (Hong Kong) Kevin Choi | $38,328 |
| 8th | (China) Lei Yu (0/1) | $29,364 |
| 9th | (Brazil) Gustavo Andolhe | $17,761 |

=== Event #96: $3,000 Pot-Limit Omaha 6-Handed ===
- 4-Day Event: July 13–16
- Number of Entries: 1,088
- Total Prize Pool: $2,904,960
- Number of Payouts: 164
- Winning Hand: K♣ Q♣ J♦ 6♦

Final Table
| Place | Name | Prize |
|---|---|---|
| 1st | (United States) Daniel Zack (1/4) | $471,170 |
| 2nd | (United States) Zachary Schwartz | $314,056 |
| 3rd | (United States) Joshua Ladines | $216,539 |
| 4th | (United Kingdom) Richard Gryko (0/1) | $151,802 |
| 5th | (Bulgaria) Fahredin Mustafov | $108,231 |
| 6th | (United States) Jeremy Ausmus (0/6) | $78,504 |

=== Event #97: $1,500 No-Limit Hold'em The Closer ===
- 2-Day Event: July 14–16
- Number of Entries: 4,297
- Total Prize Pool: $4,687,273
- Number of Payouts: 317
- Winning Hand: A♦ 10♣

Final Table
| Place | Name | Prize |
|---|---|---|
| 1st | (Czech Republic) Lukas Zaskodny (1/2) | $648,130 |
| 2nd | (United States) Richard Ali | $432,090 |
| 3rd | (Hong Kong) Lok Chan | $321,830 |
| 4th | (United States) Thang Tran | $241,610 |
| 5th | (Romania) Adrian Tivadar | $182,830 |
| 6th | (United States) Dylan Lambe | $139,460 |
| 7th | (Canada) Jimmy Setna (0/1) | $107,240 |
| 8th | (Spain) Victor Caballero | $83,130 |
| 9th | (Taiwan) Tawei Tou | $64,980 |

=== Event #98: $25,000 High Roller H.O.R.S.E. ===
- 3-Day Event: July 14–16
- Number of Entries: 150
- Total Prize Pool: $3,525,000
- Number of Payouts: 23
- Winning Hand: Q♣ J♥ J♦ 6♣ 5♦ 4♣ 2♣

Final Table
| Place | Name | Prize |
|---|---|---|
| 1st | (United States) Chad Eveslage (1/4) | $883,841 |
| 2nd | (United States) Brian Rast* (1/7) | $586,539 |
| 3rd | (United Kingdom) Toby Lewis (0/1) | $399,763 |
| 4th | (Argentina) Nacho Barbero (0/1) | $280,030 |
| 5th | (United States) Ryan Miller (0/2) | $201,761 |
| 6th | (United States) Phil Ivey* (0/11) | $149,643 |
| 7th | (United States) John Hennigan* (0/7) | $114,350 |
| 8th | (United States) Chris Hunichen (0/1) | $90,110 |
| 9th | (United States) Ben Yu (0/4) | $73,299 |

=== Event #99: $5,000 No-Limit Hold'em 8-Handed ===
- 2-Day Event: July 15–16
- Number of Entries: 735
- Total Prize Pool: $3,381,000
- Number of Payouts: 111
- Winning Hand: Q♣ Q♦

Final Table
| Place | Name | Prize |
|---|---|---|
| 1st | (United States) Andrew Ostapchenko (1/1) | $606,849 |
| 2nd | (United States) Brandon Wilson | $404,532 |
| 3rd | (United States) David "ODB" Baker (1/4) | $283,554 |
| 4th | (Philippines) Vamerdino Magsakay | $201,811 |
| 5th | (Lebanon) Joseph Sabe | $145,875 |
| 6th | (United States) Sam Laskowitz | $107,115 |
| 7th | (United States) Pat Lyons (0/1) | $79,921 |
| 8th | (United States) Marcos Skerl | $60,608 |

=== Event #100: $1,000 Super Turbo No-Limit Hold'em ===
- 1-Day Event: July 16
- Number of Entries: 1,935
- Total Prize Pool: $1,702,800
- Number of Payouts: 291
- Winning Hand: K♠ 5♣

Final Table
| Place | Name | Prize |
|---|---|---|
| 1st | (United Kingdom) Mitchell Hynam (1/1) | $237,924 |
| 2nd | (Canada) Nadav Bitton | $158,578 |
| 3rd | (Japan) Kei Tanaka | $115,295 |
| 4th | (Taiwan) Nevan Chang | $84,733 |
| 5th | (Canada) Jacob Parent | $62,954 |
| 6th | (Austria) Lukas Hafner | $47,290 |
| 7th | (United States) Brett Shaffer (0/2) | $35,921 |
| 8th | (Austria) Paulina Loeliger | $27,594 |
| 9th | (United States) Alexander Duvall | $21,440 |
