= William Kassouf =

English poker player

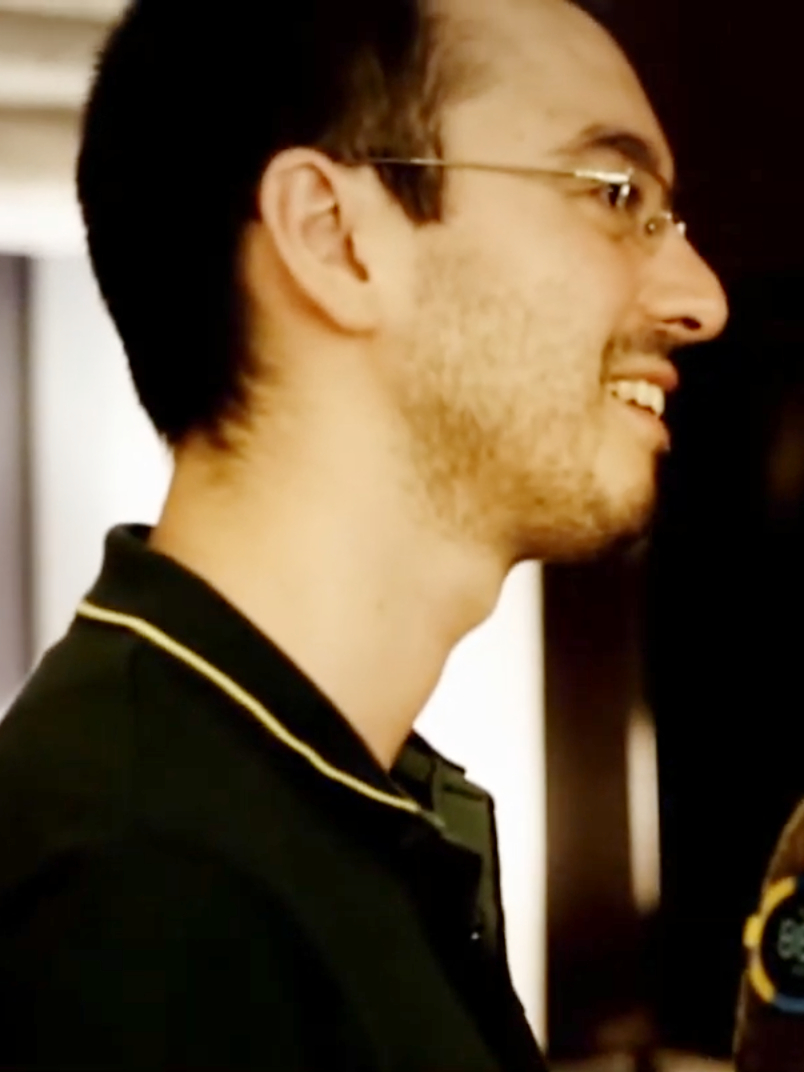
Kassouf in 2017

William Kassouf (born 19 December 1981) is an English poker player.

Kassouf has a controversial playstyle, and is known for his excessive speech play and stalling. As of 2025, he had $2,069,327 in tournament earnings.

== Life ==
Kassouf was born on 19 December 1981 in London. Initially pursuing a career as a lawyer, he later switched to poker full-time. Kassouf built his bankroll playing at Grosvenor Casino The Victoria in London, and chose to pursue a professional career in 2013. His first significant tournament cash came at the 2009 Irish Poker Tour €3200 + 300 NLH, with a 6th-place finish for €100,800.

Kassouf first gained notoriety for his playstyle in the 2016 WSOP Main Event where he finished 17th, cashing for $338,288. In 2018, on a night out at a casino, he was accused of stealing a £100 chip from one of his friends whilst playing roulette, for which he later apologised. In the 2025 WSOP Main Event Kassouf finished 33rd and cashed for $300,000. His elimination was met with applause from others at the table and jeers from spectators following an outburst in which he insulted his opponent. He continued ranting in post-elimination interviews, leading to his getting banned from the rest of the 2025 series.
