= Leo Margets =

Spanish poker player (born 1983)

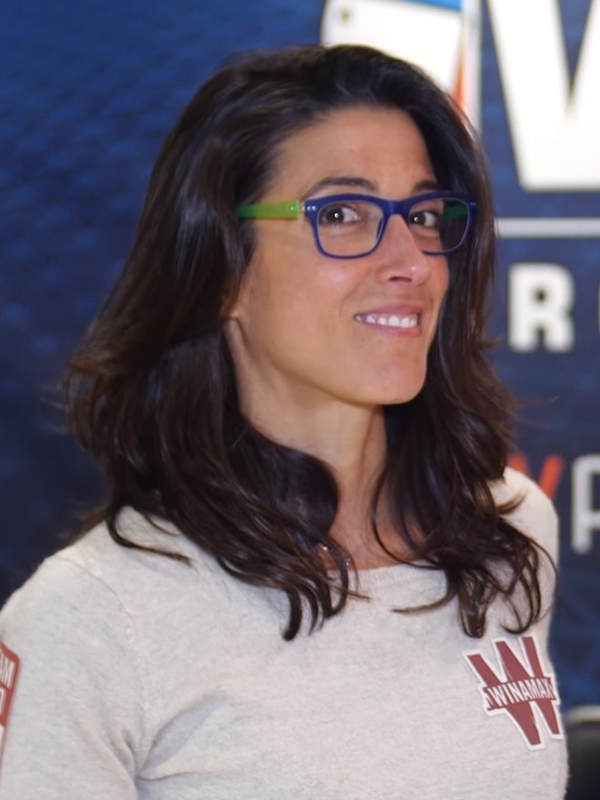
- Margets in 2019
- Born: August 10, 1983 (age 43); Barcelona, Spain

World Series of Poker
- Bracelet: 1
- Final tables: 3
- Money finishes: 33
- Highest WSOP Main Event finish: 7th, 2025

European Poker Tour
- Money finishes: 15

Leonor Margets Perez (born August 10, 1983) is a Spanish professional poker player from Barcelona, Spain. In 2025, she became the first woman in 30 years to make the final table of the World Series of Poker Main Event. She also won a WSOP bracelet in 2021.

Margets graduated from the University of Roehampton in London and has a master's degree in Communication Business Management. Before her poker career, she worked at IMG.

Margets finished in 27th place in the 2009 WSOP Main Event. At the 2018 WSOP, she finished runner-up in the $1,000 Double Stack No-Limit Hold'em event. Margets won her first WSOP bracelet in the $1,500 No-Limit Hold'em Closer in 2021, defeating a field of 1,903 to earn $376,000; as of 2025, she remains the last woman to win an open-field event at the WSOP in Las Vegas, Nevada.

In 2025, Margets made it through a field of 9,735 to make the WSOP Main Event final table. She was only the second woman in WSOP history to make the final table, and the first since Barbara Enright in 1995. Beginning in fifth place on the leaderboard, she was eventually eliminated in seventh place when her pair of aces lost to Kenny Hallaert's rivered flush. She earned $1,500,000, the largest score by a woman in the Main Event.

Outside of poker, Margets competed on the Spanish version of Survivor, Supervivientes, in 2014. She also won the Spanish version of The Traitors in 2023. Margets published a book, Play Your Cards Well, in 2017, and has completed 10 marathons.

As of 2025, Margets' total live tournament earnings exceed $3,590,000.

== World Series of Poker bracelets ==
| Year | Tournament | Prize (US$) |
|---|---|---|
| 2021 | $1,500 The Closer No-Limit Hold'em | $376,850 |
