= 2025 World Series of Poker =

Series of poker tournaments

- Location: Horseshoe Las Vegas and Paris Las Vegas, Las Vegas, Nevada
- Dates: May 27 – July 16

Champion
- (United States) Michael Mizrachi

The 2025 World Series of Poker (WSOP) was the 56th annual edition of the World Series of Poker, a festival of poker tournaments. It was held from May 27 – July 16 at Paris Las Vegas and Horseshoe Las Vegas in Las Vegas, Nevada.

There were 100 bracelet events. New tournament formats included the Battle of the Ages event, where players aged 50 and older play one starting flight and those younger play the other before combining on Day 2. There was also a T.O.R.S.E. event, with 2-7 Triple Draw replacing Limit Hold'em in the rotation. The $10,000 No-Limit Hold'em Main Event began on July 2, with the final table taking place over two days from July 15–16.

Michael Mizrachi won the $10,000 No-Limit Hold'em Main Event, earning $10,000,000 and his eighth championship bracelet; nineteen days prior he won the $50,000 Poker Players Championship. Shaun Deeb won the $100,000 Pot-Limit Omaha High Roller event for his seventh bracelet, while also finishing runner up three times; his performance earned Player of the Year honors for a second time. Benny Glaser became the seventh player to win three bracelets in a year.

The $1,500 Millionaire Maker event ended in controversy after Jesse Yaginuma overcame a 9-1 chip deficit to defeat James Carroll. The WSOP and Nevada gaming authorities conducted an investigation into allegations of "chip dumping," whereby one player may intentionally bet large amounts without intending to win the pot, in order for another player to benefit. Yaginuma was eligible to claim a $1 million promotional prize from sweepstakes poker site ClubWPT Gold if he won a WSOP bracelet; it was theorized that Yaginuma and Carroll privately agreed to play in a manner which would guarantee Yagninuma would win and then share the additional money. Yaginuma was allowed to keep the first-place cash prize and ClubWPT Gold announced that they would pay his bonus prize; however the bracelet was not awarded and both players were banned from future events.

== Schedule ==
Key: (bracelets won in 2025/bracelets won in career)

| High stakes event ($10,000+ buy-in). |
| No points awarded towards Player of the Year. |
| Online event. |
| Online event, with in-person final table. |

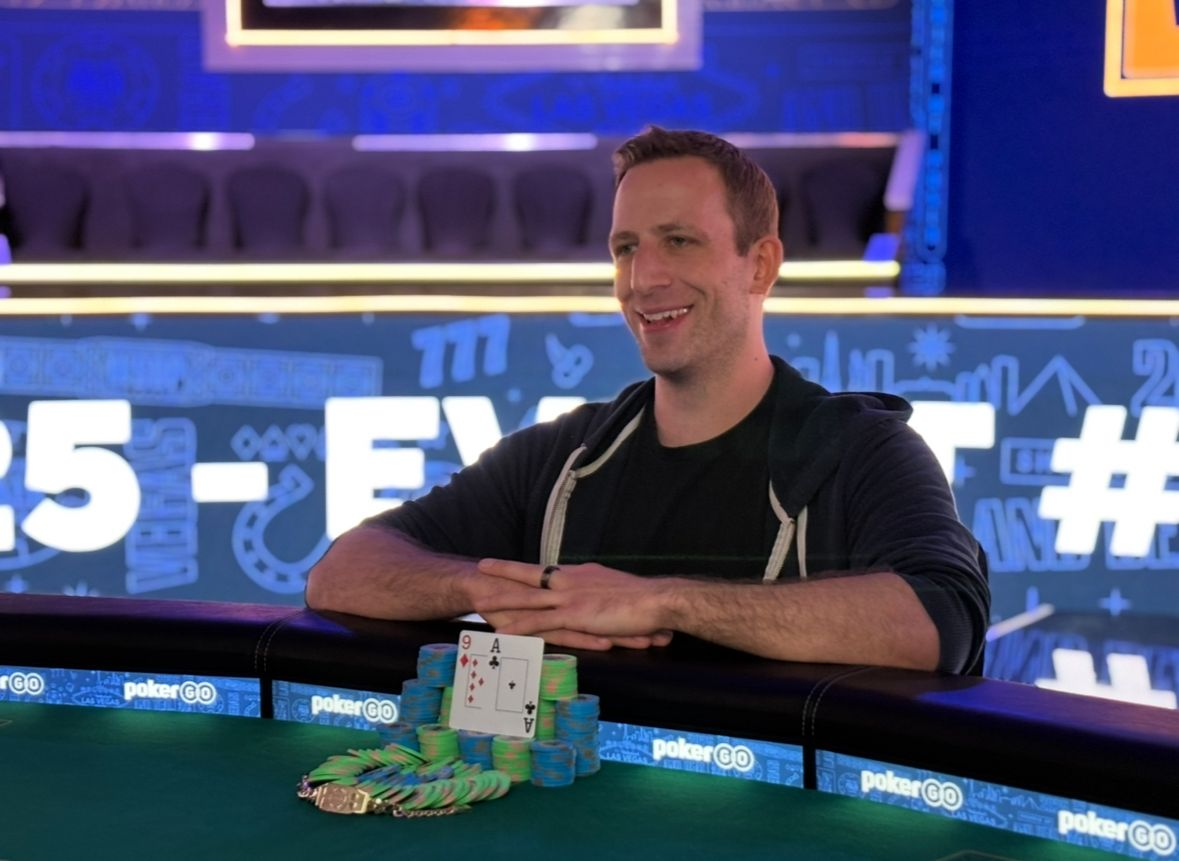
Benny Glaser after winning Event #8

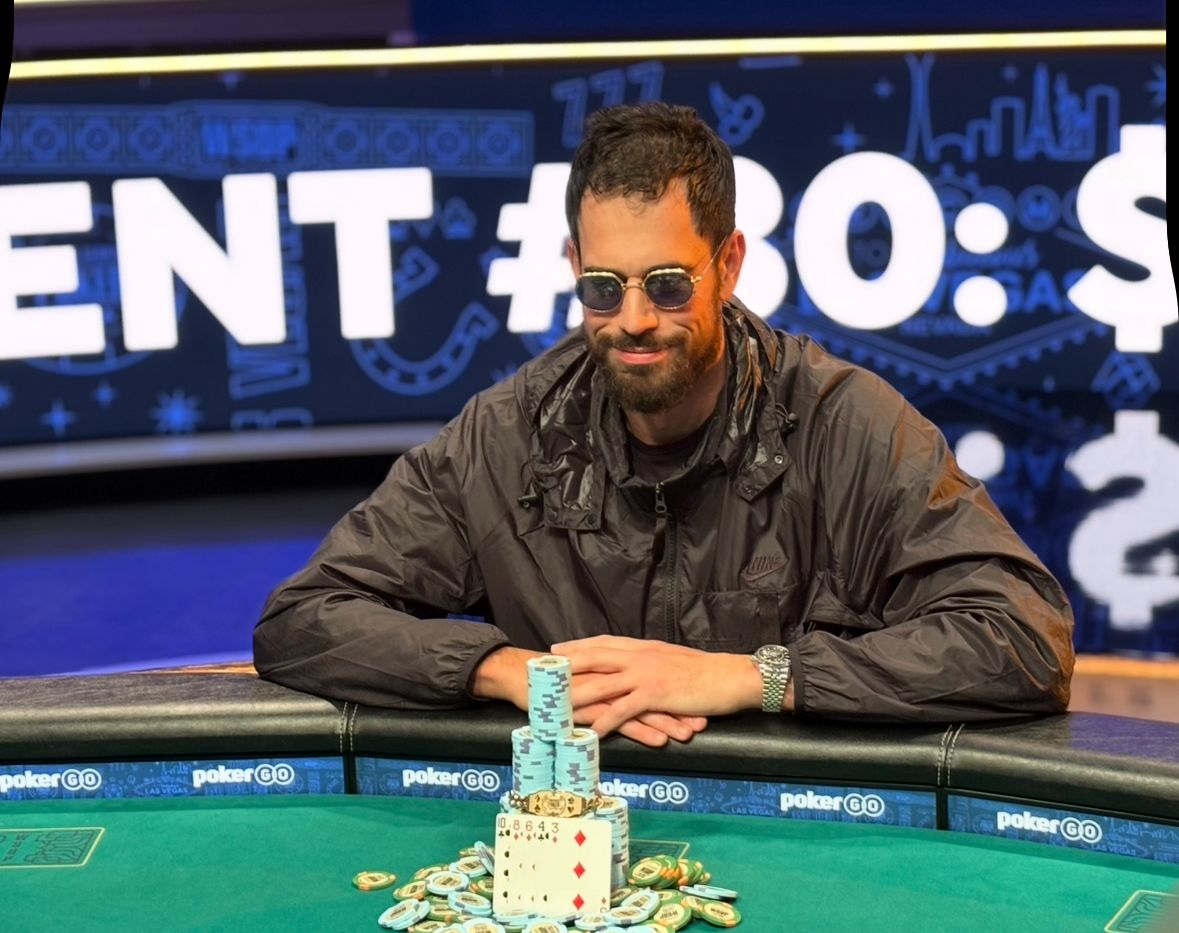
Nick Schulman after winning Event #30

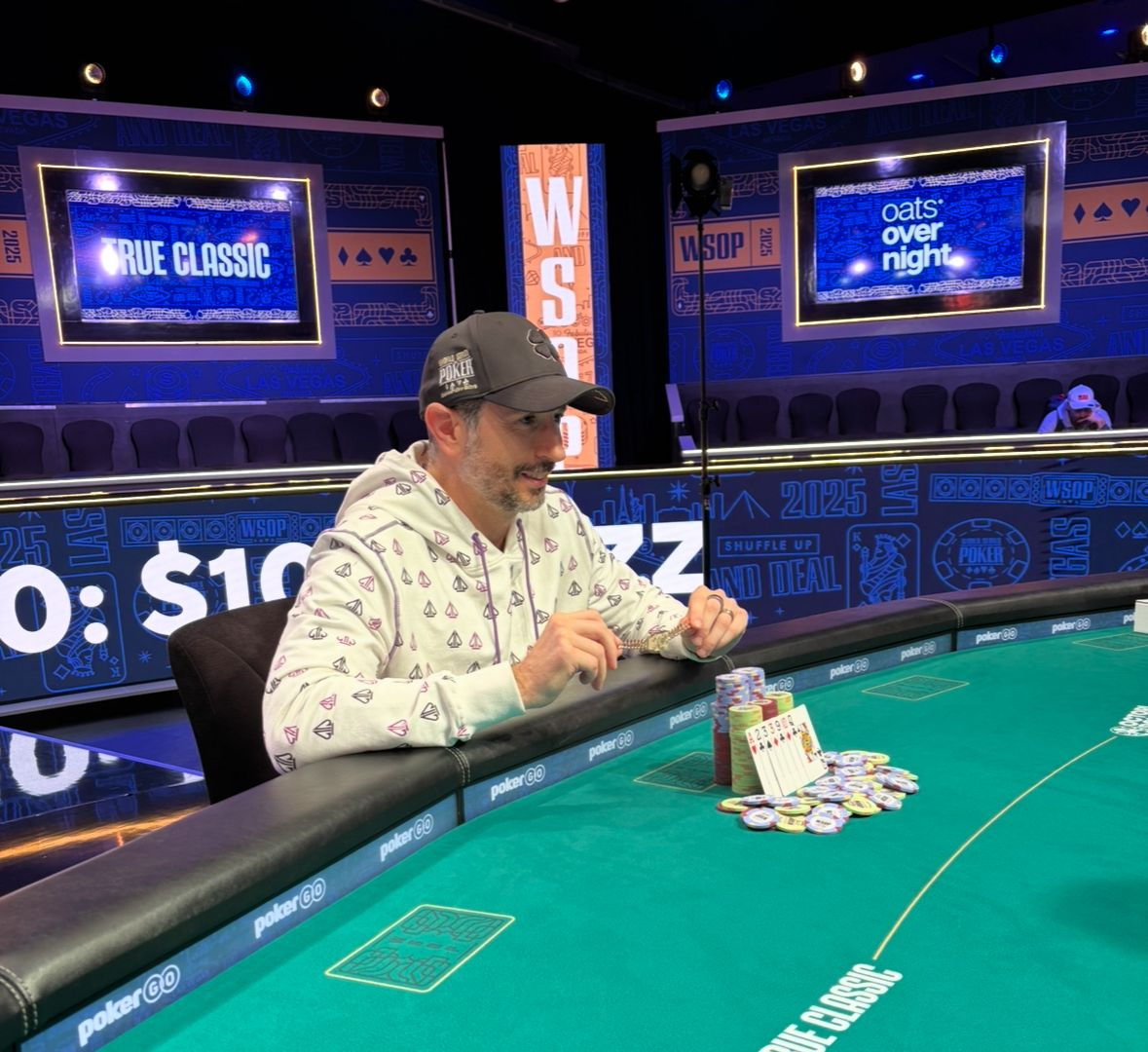
Brian Rast after winning Event #50

| # | Event | Entrants | Winner | Prize | Runner-up | Results |
|---|---|---|---|---|---|---|
| 1 | $1,000 No-Limit Hold'em Mystery Millions | 19,654 | (United States) Michael Wilklow (1/1) | $1,000,000 | (Costa Rica) Michael Acevedo | Results |
| 2 | $500 Industry Employees No-Limit Hold'em | 914 | (United States) Phovieng Keokham (1/1) | $64,369 | (United States) Christopher Zollo | Results |
| 3 | $5,000 Eight Handed No-Limit Hold'em | 693 | (Spain) Antonio Galiana (1/2) | $582,008 | (Canada) Frederic Normand | Results |
| 4 | $1,500 Omaha Hi-Lo 8 or Better | 910 | (United States) David Shmuel (1/1) | $205,333 | (United States) Joe Ford | Results |
| 5 | $5,000 Pot-Limit Omaha | 757 | (United States) Caleb "Bruno" Furth (1/2) | $620,696 | (Germany) Fabian Riebau-Schmithals | Results |
| 6 | $1,500 Seven Card Stud | 377 | (United States) Dan Heimiller (1/3) | $106,840 | (United States) David Bach (0/3) | Results |
| 7 | $25,000 Heads-Up No-Limit Hold'em Championship | 64 | (Russia) Artur Martirosian (1/3) | $500,000 | (Belarus) Aliaksei Boika | Results |
| 8 | $1,500 Dealers Choice | 597 | (United Kingdom) Benny Glaser (1/6) | $150,246 | (United States) Matthew Schreiber (0/1) | Results |
| o1 | $400 No Limit Hold'em - Kick Off | 2,206 | (Germany) Konstantin Held (1/2) | $97,762 | (United States) Corey Thompson (0/1) | |
| 9 | $10,000 Omaha Hi-Lo 8 or Better Championship | 217 | (United States) Ryan Bambrick (1/2) | $470,437 | (Canada) Daniel Negreanu (0/7) | Results |
| o2 | $555 No Limit Hold'em - Mystery Bounty | 2,551 | (United States) Joseph Casseus (1/1) | $95,464+bounties | (United States) Tim Flattery | |
| o3 | $888 No Limit Hold'em - Crazy 8s | 920 | (United States) Corey Thompson (1/2) | $136,160 | (Brazil) Yuri Dzivielevski (0/5) | |
| 10 | $600 No-Limit Hold'em Deepstack | 6,090 | (United States) Kenneth Kim (1/1) | $318,842 | (Ecuador) Alex Paredes | Results |
| 11 | $10,000 Mystery Bounty | 616 | (United States) Yosef Fox (1/1) | $729,333 | (Spain) Alejandro Peinado | Results |
| 12 | $1,500 No-Limit Hold'em 2–7 Lowball Draw | 532 | (United States) Brad Ruben (1/5) | $130,080 | (United States) Han Liu | Results |
| 13 | $1,500 No-Limit Hold'em Six-Handed | 2,354 | (United States) Christopher Staats (1/2) | $414,950 | (United States) David Jackson (0/2) | Results |
| 14 | $25,000 Mixed PLO/NLH High Roller | 245 | (United States) Lou "Ap" Garza (1/2) | $1,302,233 | (United States) Ben Lamb (0/2) | Results |
| o4 | $1,000 No Limit Hold'em - PKO | 770 | (United States) Brek Schutten (1/2) | $46,396 | (United States) Jed Hoffman | |
| 15 | $1,500 Mixed Omaha | 1,239 | (United Kingdom) Benny Glaser (2/7) | $258,193 | (United States) Travis Pearson | Results |
| 16 | $600 Pot-Limit Omaha Deepstack | 3,110 | (Colombia) Cristian Gutierrez (1/1) | $193,780 | (United States) Robert Chorlian | Results |
| 17 | $2,000 No-Limit Hold'em | 1,692 | (United States) Scott Bohlman (1/2) | $436,044 | (United States) Dusti Smith | Results |
| 18 | $10,000 Dealers Choice Championship | 152 | (United States) Ryan Hoenig (1/1) | $354,444 | (United States) Dylan Smith | Results |
| 19 | $500 No-Limit Hold'em Colossus | 16,301 | (United States) Courtenay Williams (1/1) | $542,540 | (United States) Ramaswamy Pyloore | Results |
| 20 | $1,500 No-Limit Hold'em Shootout | 1,299 | (United States) Michael Lavin (1/2) | $267,373 | (United States) Michael Rossitto | Results |
| 21 | $1,500 Pot-Limit Omaha Hi-Lo 8 or Better | 1,176 | (Canada) Zachary Zaret (1/1) | $248,245 | (United States) Calvin Anderson (0/5) | Results |
| 22 | $25,000 No-Limit Hold'em Six-Handed High Roller | 336 | (Slovenia) Blaz Zerjav (1/1) | $1,734,717 | (United Kingdom) Chris Moorman (0/2) | Results |
| 23 | $1,500 Badugi | 534 | (Brazil) Aloisio Dourado (1/1) | $138,114 | (United States) Dominick Sarle (0/1) | Results |
| 24 | $1,500 Pot-Limit Omaha Double Board Bomb Pot | 1,452 | (China) Xixiang Luo (1/3) | $290,400 | (United States) Robert Klein | Results |
| o5 | $600 No Limit Hold'em - Deepstack | 1,465 | (United States) Joshua Palmer (1/1) | $109,251 | (Taiwan) Sin Lan Chen | |
| 25 | $10,000 Seven Card Stud Championship | 127 | (United States) Nick Guagenti (1/3) | $295,008 | (United States) Chino Rheem | Results |
| 26 | $25,000 No-Limit Hold'em High Roller | 392 | (South Korea) Chang Lee (1/1) | $1,949,044 | (United States) Andrew Ostapchenko | Results |
| 27 | $1,500 Big O | 1,499 | (United States) Igor Zektser (1/1) | $297,285 | (United States) Paul Sincere | Results |
| o6 | $333 No Limit Hold'em - Triple Treys | 2,119 | (United States) Sean Rosenthal (1/1) | $78,218 | (United States) Josh Arieh (0/6) | |
| 28 | $600 Mixed No-Limit Hold'em/Pot-Limit Omaha Deepstack | 2,775 | (United States) Tyler Brown (1/2) | $178,126 | (Norway) Bjorn Gravlien | Results |
| 29 | $2,500 No-Limit Hold'em | 1,493 | (United States) Mark Darner (1/1) | $496,826 | (United States) David McGowan | Results |
| 30 | $10,000 No-Limit 2–7 Lowball Draw Championship | 233 | (United States) Nick Schulman (1/7) | $497,356 | (United States) Darren Elias | Results |
| o7 | $250 No Limit Hold'em - Mystery Bounty | | cancelled due to technical reasons | | | |
| 31 | $800 No-Limit Hold'em Deepstack | 4,481 | (United States) Jonathan Stoeber (1/1) | $352,610 | (United States) Daniel Cosner | Results |
| 32 | $50,000 No-Limit Hold'em High Roller | 171 | (United States) Jason Koon (1/2) | $1,968,927 | (United States) Andrew Lichtenberger (0/1) | Results |
| 33 | $1,500 Limit Hold'em | 491 | (United States) Jason Duong (1/1) | $130,061 | (United States) Adam Tyburski | Results |
| 34 | $1,500 No-Limit Hold'em Super Turbo Bounty | 2,232 | (United States) John Racener (1/3) | $247,595 | (Israel) Liran Betito | Results |
| o8 | $1,000 No Limit Hold'em - Freezeout | 533 | (United States) Jonathan Little (1/1) | $90,663 | (United States) KC Vaughan (0/1) | |
| 35 | $3,000 No-Limit Hold'em Freezeout | 1,027 | (Ukraine) Renat Bohdanov (1/2) | $451,600 | (Brazil) Dennys Ramos | Results |
| 36 | $10,000 Pot-Limit Omaha Hi-Lo 8 or Better Championship | 386 | (United Kingdom) Philip Sternheimer (1/1) | $763,087 | (United States) Caleb "Bruno" Furth (1/2) | Results |
| 37 | $1,500 No-Limit Hold'em Monster Stack | 9,920 | (Austria) Klemens Roiter (1/1) | $1,204,457 | (United States) David Uvaydov | Results |
| 38 | $100,000 No-Limit Hold'em High Roller | 103 | (Portugal) João Vieira (1/4) | $2,649,158 | (Armenia) Aram Oganyan | Results |
| 39 | $1,500 H.O.R.S.E. | 867 | (Russia) Andrey Zhigalov (1/2) | $197,923 | (Canada) Thomas Taylor | Results |
| 40 | $5,000 Seniors High Roller No-Limit Hold'em | 750 | (United States) David "ODB" Baker (1/4) | $646,845 | (China) Chuanshu Chen | Results |
| 41 | $10,000 Limit Hold'em Championship | 118 | (United States) Ian Johns (1/4) | $282,455 | (Sweden) Viktor Blom | Results |
| 42 | $1,000 Pot-Limit Omaha | 1,932 | (Argentina) Carlos Leiva (1/1) | $237,852 | (United States) Hooman Nikzad | Results |
| 43 | $1,500 Razz | 472 | (United States) Allan Le (1/2) | $126,363 | (United States) Shaun Deeb (0/6) | Results |
| o9 | $400 Pot Limit Omaha - PLOSSUS PKO 6-Max | 1,916 | (United States) Orson Young (1/1) | $38,800 | (United States) Allen Feldman | |
| 44 | $10,000 Big O Championship | 402 | (Thailand) Veerachai Vongxaiburana (1/1) | $784,353 | (United States) Phil Hui (0/4) | Results |
| o10 | $1,000 No Limit Hold'em - 6-Max | 1,107 | (United States) Nick Maimone (1/2) | $181,625 | (United States) Matthew Iles | |
| 45 | $500 Salute to Warriors No-Limit Hold'em | 3,937 | (United States) Joey Couden (1/2) | $187,937 | (United States) Richard Buckingham | Results |
| 46 | $250,000 Super High Roller No-Limit Hold'em | 63 | (United States) Seth Davies (1/1) | $4,752,551 | (United States) Alex Foxen (0/3) | Results |
| 47 | $2,500 Mixed Omaha/Seven Card Stud Hi-Lo | 575 | (United States) Jason Daly (1/2) | $244,674 | (Hong Kong) Kevin Choi | Results |
| 48 | $1,000 Seniors No-Limit Hold'em Championship | 7,575 | (United States) Brett Lim (1/1) | $653,839 | (United States) Elan Lepovic | Results |
| 49 | $3,000 No-Limit Hold'em Six-Handed | 1,421 | (United States) Tyler Patterson (1/2) | $574,223 | (United States) Matthew Wantman | Results |
| 50 | $10,000 Razz Championship | 134 | (United States) Brian Rast (1/7) | $306,644 | (United States) Andrew Yeh (0/1) | Results |
| o11 | $3,200 No Limit Hold'em - High Roller | 444 | (Spain) Adrián Mateos (1/5) | $253,080 | (Bulgaria) Alex Kulev (0/1) | |
| 51 | $25,000 High Roller Pot-Limit Omaha | 489 | (Germany) Dennis Weiss (1/2) | $2,292,155 | (United States) Michael Duek | Results |
| 52 | $1,500 No-Limit Hold'em Freezeout | 2,320 | (United States) Samuel Rosborough (1/1) | $410,426 | (United States) Asher Conniff (0/1) | Results |
| 53 | $1,500 Millionaire Maker No-Limit Hold'em | 11,996 | (United States) Jesse Yaginuma (0/3) (WSOP decision not to award bracelet) | $1,255,180 | (United States) James Carroll | Results |
| 54 | $1,500 Pot-Limit Omaha | 1,564 | (United States) Matt Vengrin (1/1) | $306,791 | (United States) Bryce Yockey (0/2) | Results |
| 55 | $10,000 H.O.R.S.E. Championship | 207 | (United States) Kristopher Tong (1/1) | $452,689 | (United States) Maximilian Schindler | Results |
| 56 | $2,500 Mixed Triple Draw Lowball | 463 | (United Kingdom) Benny Glaser (3/8) | $208,552 | (United States) Schuyler Thornton | Results |
| 57 | $50,000 High Roller Pot-Limit Omaha | 194 | (United States) Dylan Linde (1/3) | $2,146,414 | (United Kingdom) Stephen Chidwick (0/2) | Results |
| o12 | $600 No Limit Hold'em - Monsterstack | 1,777 | (United States) Matthew Wantman (1/1) | $125,131 | (United States) Shaun Deeb (0/6) | |
| 58 | $3,000 Nine Game Mix | 409 | (United Kingdom) Robert Wells (1/1) | $228,115 | (Canada) Thomas Taylor | Results |
| o13 | $500 No Limit Hold'em - Mystery Bounty | 3,213 | (United States) Matthew Baker (1/1) | $109,720 | (Canada) Benjamin Underwood | |
| o14 | $888 No Limit Hold'em - Crazy 8s | 1,182 | (United States) Darren Elias (1/1) | $170,208 | (Bulgaria) Lachezar Petkov | |
| 59 | $1,000 No-Limit Hold'em Battle of the Ages | 3,074 | (Netherlands) Sebastiaan de Jonge (1/1) | $335,390 | (Argentina) Ignacio Sagra | Results |
| 60 | $3,000 Limit Hold'em Six-Handed | 343 | (United States) Moshe Gavrieli (1/1) | $200,303 | (United States) Scott Bohlman (1/2) | Results |
| 61 | $500 No-Limit Hold'em Freezeout | 5,082 | (United States) Craig Savage (1/1) | $229,628 | (United States) Tony Harrison | Results |
| 62 | $5,000 No-Limit Hold'em Six-Handed | 1,168 | (United States) Andjelko Andrejevic (1/1) | $855,515 | (France) Adrien Delmas | Results |
| 63 | $1,500 Lowball Triple Draw | 635 | (United States) Aaron Cummings (1/2) | $157,172 | (United States) Travis Erdman | Results |
| o15 | $400 No Limit Hold'em - Ultra Deepstack | 1,989 | (United States) Frank Marasco (1/1) | $93,373 | (United Kingdom) Thomas Hall | |
| 64 | $1,000 Super Seniors No-Limit Hold'em | 3,338 | (United States) Lonny Weitzel (1/1) | $356,494 | (Canada) Damir Stefanic | Results |
| 65 | $1,000 Tag Team No-Limit Hold'em | 1,373 | (Brazil) Kelvin Kerber (1/1) (Brazil) Peter Patricio (1/1) | $184,780 | (France) Samy Boujmala (France) Hicham Mahmouki | Results |
| 66 | $50,000 Poker Players Championship | 107 | (United States) Michael Mizrachi (1/7) | $1,331,322 | (United States) Bryn Kenney (0/2) | Results |
| 67 | $300 Gladiators of Poker No-Limit Hold'em | 24,629 | (United States) Ian Pelz (1/1) | $420,680 | (United States) Sang Sim | Results |
| 68 | $3,000 No-Limit Hold'em | 2,338 | (China) Yilong Wang (1/1) | $830,685 | (Israel) Ran Ilani | Results |
| 69 | $1,500 Seven Card Stud Hi-Lo 8 or Better | 615 | (Slovenia) Blaz Zerjav (2/2) | $153,487 | (United States) Huck Seed (0/4) | Results |
| 70 | $10,000/$1,000 Ladies No-Limit Hold'em Championship | 1,368 | (Japan) Shiina Okamoto (1/2) | $184,094 | (United States) Heather Alcorn | Results |
| 71 | $10,000 Limit 2–7 Lowball Triple Draw Championship | 141 | (United States) Alexander Wilkinson (1/1) | $333,054 | (United States) Matthew Schreiber (0/1) | Results |
| 72 | $10,000 Super Turbo Bounty No-Limit Hold'em | 122 | (Germany) Rainer Kempe (1/1) | $892,701 | (Japan) Yuya Arito | Results |
| 73 | $1,500 Eight Game Mix | 789 | (Romania) Narcis Nedelcu (1/1) | $184,683 | (United States) Scott Abrams (0/1) | Results |
| o16 | $5,300 No Limit Hold'em - High Roller 6-Max | | (United States) Justin Vaysman (1/1) | $257,400 | (Germany) Jakob Miegel | |
| 74 | $10,000 Pot-Limit Omaha Championship | 874 | (United States) Michael Wang (1/3) | $1,394,579 | (United States) Michael Zulker | Results |
| o17 | $500 No Limit Hold'em - Deepstacks | 2,501 | (United Kingdom) Harry Lodge (1/2) | $138,544 | (United States) Lawrence Brandt (0/2) | |
| o18 | $2,500 No Limit Hold'em | 547 | (United States) Joshua Remitio (1/3) | $243,881 | (United States) Nick Guagenti (1/3) | |
| 75 | $1,000 Mini Main Event No-Limit Hold'em | 10,794 | (Czech Republic) Martin Kabrhel (1/4) | $843,140 | (United States) Alexander Yen | Results |
| 76 | $2,500 Mixed Big Bet | 458 | (United States) Aaron Kupin (1/1) | $206,982 | (United States) Marco Johnson (0/2) | Results |
| 77 | $10,000 Seven Card Stud Hi-Lo 8 or Better Championship | 186 | (United States) Qinghai Pan (1/3) | $411,051 | (United States) David Lin | Results |
| o19 | $777 No Limit Hold'em - Lucky 7s | 1,386 | (United States) Manas Gandhi (1/1) | $174,636 | (United States) Michael Moncek (0/2) | |
| 78 | $600 PokerNews Deepstack Championship | 5,667 | (United States) Nick Ahmadi (1/1) | $302,165 | (Israel) Ran Kadur | Results |
| 79 | $100,000 High Roller Pot-Limit Omaha | 121 | (United States) Shaun Deeb (1/7) | $2,959,297 | (United States) Isaac Haxton (0/1) | Results |
| 80 | $800 Summer Celebration No-Limit Hold'em | 7,078 | (Italy) Giuseppe Zarbo (1/1) | $504,180 | (Japan) Ryo Kotake | Results |
| 81 | $10,000 No-Limit Hold'em Main Event | 9,735 | (United States) Michael Mizrachi (2/8) | $10,000,000 | (United States) John Wasnock | Results |
| 82 | $10,000 Eight Game Mix | 195 | (Russia) Mike Gorodinsky (1/5) | $422,421 | (United States) Eric Wasserson (0/1) | Results |
| o20 | $555 Pot Limit Omaha - PLO Bounty 6-Max | 1,691 | (United States) Michael Banducci (1/2) | $77,653 | (United States) Michael Lavin (1/2) | |
| 83 | $2,500 No-Limit Hold'em Freezeout | 1,299 | (United States) Cary Katz (1/1) | $449,245 | (Brazil) Breno Drumond | Results |
| 84 | $1,000 No-Limit Hold'em | 1,873 | (Czech Republic) Zdenek Zizka (1/1) | $232,498 | (United States) Shaun Deeb (1/7) | Results |
| o21 | $600 No Limit Hold'em - Online Deepstack Championship | 1,307 | (United States) Jordan Westmorland (1/1) | $97,469 | (United States) Philip Beck (0/1) | |
| 85 | $600 No-Limit Hold'em Ultra Stack | 7,057 | (United States) Justin Fawcett (1/1) | $355,110 | (United States) Thai Dinh | Results |
| o22 | $1,000 No Limit Hold'em - Mystery Bounty Championship | | (United States) Salvatore Dicarlo (1/1) | $120,020 | (United States) Mark Lewandowski | |
| o23 | $400 No Limit Hold'em - Colossus | 3,141 | (United States) Travis Stover (1/1) | $147,452 | (United States) Richard Basile | |
| o24 | $1,000 No Limit Hold'em - 6-Max Online Championship | 825 | (Bulgaria) Stoyan Madanzhiev (1/2) | $152,514 | (United States) Julian Bonorris | |
| o25 | $1,000 No Limit Hold'em - Championship | 1,013 | (India) Aditya Agarwal (1/2) | $168,026 | (United States) Jonathan Little (1/1) | |
| 86 | $1,000 Mystery Bounty Pot-Limit Omaha | 5,284 | (Hungary) Ferenc Deak (1/1) | $329,890 | (Brazil) Paulo Drummond | Results |
| 87 | $5,000 Super Turbo Bounty No-Limit Hold'em | 1,283 | (Israel) Netanel Stern (1/1) | $618,377 | (Ukraine) Rostyslav Sabishchenko | Results |
| o26 | $5,300 No Limit Hold'em - High Roller Championship | 244 | (United States) Michael Weiss (1/1) | $237,938 | (United States) Jonathan Little (1/1) | |
| 88 | $50,000 High Roller No-Limit Hold'em | 252 | (Vietnam) Khoi Le Nguyen (1/1) | $2,686,913 | (France) Alexandre Reard (0/2) | Results |
| 89 | $3,000 Mid-Stakes Championship No-Limit Hold'em | 3,797 | (United States) Ian O'Hara (1/1) | $1,189,408 | (Bulgaria) Bahar Musa | Results |
| 90 | $777 Lucky 7's No-Limit Hold'em | 8,012 | (Spain) Nelson Mari Sanchez (1/1) | $777,777 | (Canada) Yu Liu | Results |
| 91 | $1,500 Pot-Limit Omaha Six-Handed | 1,389 | (Lithuania) Kasparas Klezys (1/1) | $280,214 | (United States) Jonathan Hanner | Results |
| o27 | $1,000 Pot Limit Omaha - 6-Max Championship | 882 | (United States) Aaron Pacheco (1/1) | $146,853 | (United States) Michael Boss | |
| 92 | $1,979 Poker Hall of Fame Bounty No-Limit Hold'em | 1,115 | (United Kingdom) Joshua Boulton (1/1) | $311,349 | (United States) Rob Wazwaz (0/1) | Results |
| 93 | $3,000 T.O.R.S.E. | 522 | (Japan) Ryutaro Suzuki (1/2) | $273,386 | (United Kingdom) Toby Lewis (0/1) | Results |
| 94 | $10,000 No-Limit Hold'em Championship Six-Handed | 546 | (United States) Sam Soverel (1/3) | $986,337 | (Spain) Daniel Vicente | Results |
| o28 | $400 No Limit Hold'em - Mystery Bounty 6-Max | 2,761 | (United States) Aaron Overton (1/1) | $91,583 | (Romania) Florian Duta | |
| o29 | $3,200 No Limit Hold'em - High Roller 6-Max | 370 | (United States) Joshua Remitio (2/4) | $217,140 | (United Kingdom) Jon Shoreman | |
| 95 | $800 No-Limit Hold'em Deepstack | 2,851 | (Argentina) Mariano Balfagon (1/1) | $252,386 | (United States) Andrew Ahn | Results |
| 96 | $3,000 Pot-Limit Omaha Six-Handed | 1,088 | (United States) Daniel Zack (1/4) | $471,170 | (United States) Zachary Schwartz | Results |
| 97 | $1,500 No-Limit Hold'em The Closer | 4,297 | (Czech Republic) Lukas Zaskodny (1/2) | $648,130 | (United States) Richard Ali | Results |
| 98 | $25,000 High Roller H.O.R.S.E. | 150 | (United States) Chad Eveslage (1/4) | $883,841 | (United States) Brian Rast (1/7) | Results |
| o30 | $500 No Limit Hold'em - Summer Saver | 1,763 | (United States) Andrew Rosen (1/1) | $103,454 | (Canada) Santiago Plante | |
| 99 | $5,000 No-Limit Hold'em | 735 | (United States) Andrew Ostapchenko (1/1) | $606,849 | (United States) Brandon Wilson | Results |
| 100 | $1,000 Super Turbo No-Limit Hold'em | 1,935 | (United Kingdom) Mitchell Hynam (1/1) | $237,924 | (Canada) Nadav Bitton | Results |

== Player of the Year ==
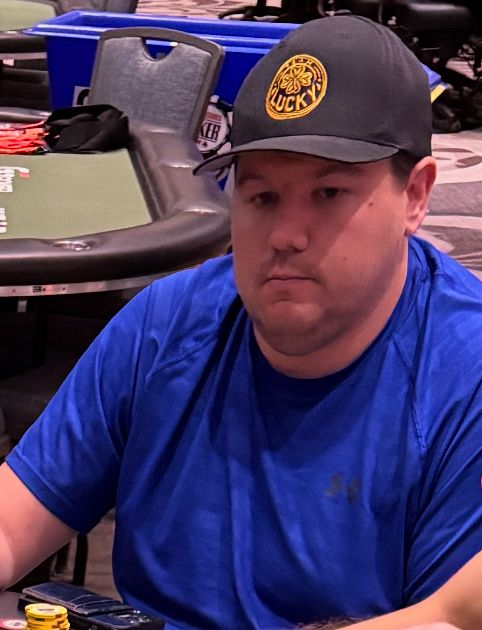
Shaun Deeb won Player of the Year for the second time

Final standings as of July 16

- The total points that any player is able to accumulate is limited to their 10 best events across the series, including a maximum of one online event.
- Does not include events from the 2025 WSOP Online series, the 2025 WSOP Europe series, or the 2025 WSOP Paradise series.

Standings
| Rank | Name | Points | Bracelets |
|---|---|---|---|
| 1 | (United States) Shaun Deeb | 4,194.10 | 1 |
| 2 | (United Kingdom) Benny Glaser | 4,153.66 | 3 |
| 3 | (United States) Michael Mizrachi | 3,804.96 | 2 |
| 4 | (Czech Republic) Martin Kabrhel | 3,639.41 | 1 |
| 5 | (United States) Scott Bohlman | 3,328.86 | 1 |
| 6 | (Portugal) João Vieira | 3,025.20 | 1 |
| 7 | (United States) Brian Rast | 3,006.66 | 1 |
| 8 | (Canada) Daniel Negreanu | 2,972.05 | 0 |
| 9 | (Austria) Klemens Roiter | 2,813.51 | 1 |
| 10 | (Czech Republic) Zdenek Zizka | 2,807.76 | 1 |

In his 2025 WSOP campaign Deeb entered 59 bracelet-events with total buy-ins (including re-entries) totalling $761,828. He cashed in 18 events (in-the-money 16.2%), winning $3,909,763 in total for a net result of +$3,147,935 - and a 413% ROI.

== Main Event ==
The $10,000 No-Limit Hold'em Main Event began on July 2 with the first of four starting flights. The final table was reached on July 13 and played over two days from July 15–16.

The Main Event attracted 9,735 entries, the third-largest field in WSOP history, generating a prize pool of $90,535,500. The top 1,461 players finished in the money, with the champion earning $10,000,000.

=== Performance of past champions ===
| Name | Championship Year(s) | Day of Elimination |
|---|---|---|
| Johnny Chan | 1987, 1988 | 3 |
| Phil Hellmuth | 1989 | 3 |
| Huck Seed | 1996 | 2D |
| Robert Varkonyi | 2002 | 2ABC |
| Chris Moneymaker | 2003 | 1A |
| Greg Raymer | 2004 | 3 |
| Jamie Gold | 2006 | 1D |
| Joe Cada | 2009 | 1A |
| Greg Merson | 2012 | 7 (52nd)* |
| Ryan Riess | 2013 | 2D |
| Martin Jacobson | 2014 | 1D |
| Joe McKeehen | 2015 | 2D |
| Qui Nguyen | 2016 | 2ABC |
| Scott Blumstein | 2017 | 2ABC |
| Hossein Ensan | 2019 | 2D |
| Damian Salas | 2020 | 5 (469th)* |
| Jonathan Tamayo | 2024 | 3 |

*- Denotes player who finished in the money

=== Other notable high finishes ===
NB: This list is restricted to top 100 finishers with an existing Wikipedia entry.

| Place | Name | Prize |
|---|---|---|
| 11th | Anthony Gregg | $750,000 |
| 33rd | William Kassouf | $300,000 |
| 52nd | Greg Merson | $200,000 |
| 99th | Isaac Haxton | $70,000 |

=== Final Table ===
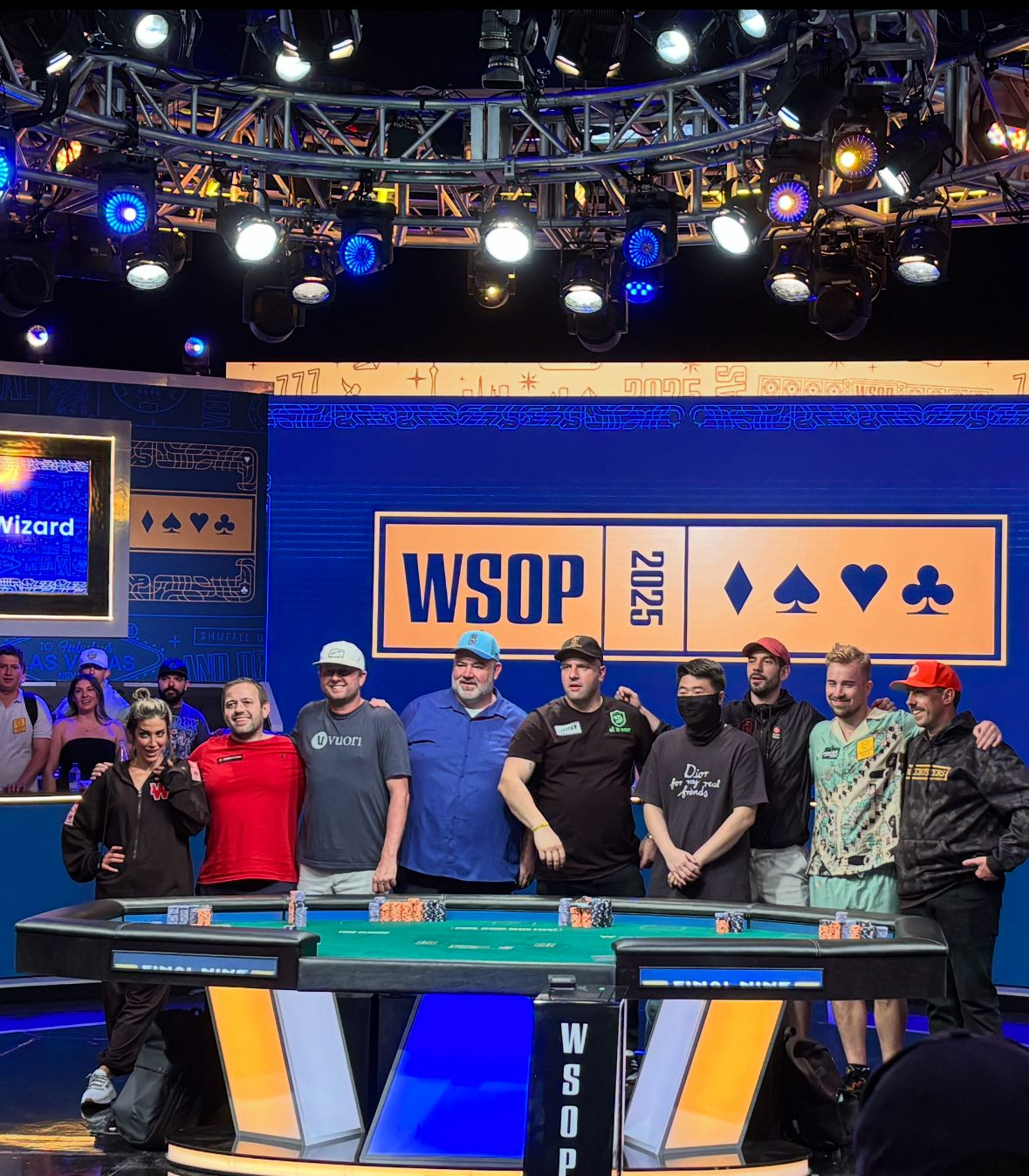
2025 WSOP Main Event final table

Leo Margets became the first woman to appear at the Main Event final table since Barbara Enright in 1995. Michael Mizrachi and Kenny Hallaert were making their second appearance at the final table; Mizrachi finished in fifth place in 2010, while Hallaert was sixth in 2016.

| Name | Number of chips (percentage of total) | WSOP Bracelets | WSOP Cashes* | WSOP Earnings* |
|---|---|---|---|---|
| (United States) John Wasnock | 108,100,000 (21.8%) | 0 | 4 | $18,400 |
| (United States) Michael Mizrachi | 93,000,000 (18.7%) | 7 | 90 | $10,680,340 |
| (United States) Braxton Dunaway | 91,900,000 (18.5%) | 1 | 7 | $1,237,910 |
| (Belgium) Kenny Hallaert | 80,500,000 (16.2%) | 0 | 124 | $3,142,136 |
| (Spain) Leo Margets | 54,300,000 (10.9%) | 1 | 33 | $1,080,695 |
| (Serbia) Luka Bojovic | 51,000,000 (10.3%) | 0 | 8 | $206,569 |
| (United States) Adam Hendrix | 48,000,000 (9.7%) | 0 | 100 | $2,052,852 |
| (South Korea) Daehyung Lee | 34,900,000 (7.0%) | 0 | 3 | $14,014 |
| (United States) Jarod Minghini | 23,600,000 (4.8%) | 0 | 22 | $131,131 |

*Career statistics prior to the Main Event

=== Final Table results ===
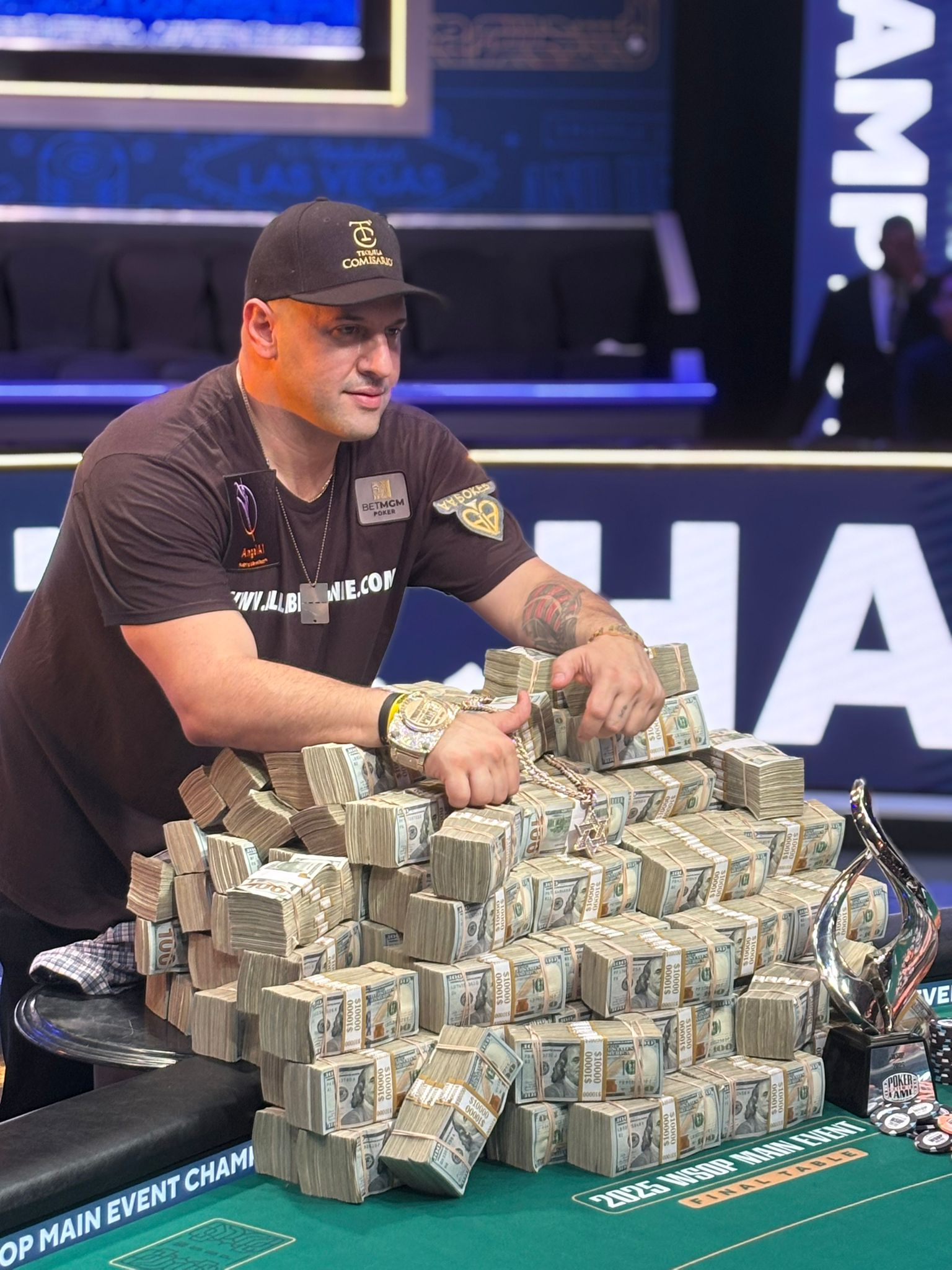
Michael Mizrachi at the 2025 WSOP Main Event

Michael Mizrachi became the first player ever to win both the Main Event and the Poker Players Championship in the same year, as well as the first previous multiple bracelet winner to win the Main Event since Stu Ungar in 1997.

| Place | Name | Prize |
|---|---|---|
| 1st | (United States) Michael Mizrachi | $10,000,000 |
| 2nd | (United States) John Wasnock | $6,000,000 |
| 3rd | (United States) Braxton Dunaway | $4,000,000 |
| 4th | (Belgium) Kenny Hallaert | $3,000,000 |
| 5th | (Serbia) Luka Bojovic | $2,400,000 |
| 6th | (United States) Adam Hendrix | $1,900,000 |
| 7th | (Spain) Leo Margets | $1,500,000 |
| 8th | (United States) Jarod Minghini | $1,250,000 |
| 9th | (South Korea) Daehyung Lee | $1,000,000 |

== The Poker Players Championship ==
The $50,000 Poker Players Championship began on June 24. The 7-handed final table was played on June 28.

The event attracted 107 entries, generating a prize pool of $5,162,750. The top 17 players finished in the money, with the champion earning $1,331,322.

=== Performance of past champions ===
| Name | Championship Year(s) | Day of Elimination |
|---|---|---|
| Freddy Deeb | 2007 | 2 |
| Michael Mizrachi | 2010, 2012, 2018 | Winner* |
| Brian Rast | 2011, 2016, 2023 | 1 |
| Matthew Ashton | 2013 | 4 (17th)* |
| John Hennigan | 2014 | 2 |
| Mike Gorodinsky | 2015 | 3 |
| Phil Hui | 2019 | 3 |
| Daniel Cates | 2021, 2022 | 1 |
| Daniel Negreanu | 2024 | 3 |

*- Denotes player who finished in the money

=== Other notable high finishes ===
NB: This list is restricted to in the money finishers with an existing Wikipedia entry.

| Place | Name | Prize |
|---|---|---|
| 8th | Ben Yu | $142,720 |
| 9th | Marco Johnson | $142,720 |
| 11th | Erick Lindgren | $121,573 |
| 12th | Mike Matusow | $108,445 |
| 15th | Ali Eslami | $101,526 |
| 17th | Matthew Ashton | $100,000 |

=== Final Table results ===
Michael Mizrachi won the tournament for a record 4th time, surpassing the 3-title record he shared with Brian Rast

| Place | Name | Prize |
|---|---|---|
| 1st | (United States) Michael Mizrachi | $1,331,322 |
| 2nd | (United States) Bryn Kenney | $887,542 |
| 3rd | (United States) Esther Taylor | $595,136 |
| 4th | (United States) Andrew Yeh | $413,740 |
| 5th | (Portugal) João Vieira | $298,614 |
| 6th | (Lebanon) Albert Daher | $224,077 |
| 7th | (United States) Ben Lamb | $175,096 |
