= Michael Banducci =

American poker player

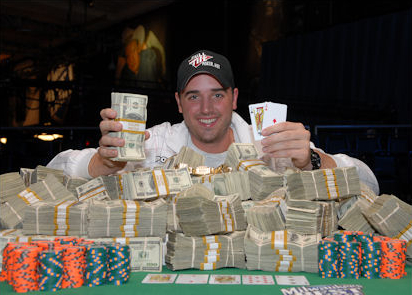
- Banducci after winning the $1,000 No Limit Hold'em at the 2008 World Series of Poker
- Nickname: luckylady519

World Series of Poker
- Bracelets: 2
- Final tables: 6
- Money finishes: 38
- Highest WSOP Main Event finish: 69th, 2016

World Poker Tour
- Title: None
- Final table: None
- Money finishes: 3

Michael Banducci is an American professional poker player who has won two World Series of Poker bracelet events.

As of 2025, his total live tournament winnings exceed $1,650,000. His 38 cashes at the WSOP account for at least $1,400,000 of those winnings.

== World Series of Poker ==
Banducci has 38 career cashes at the World Series of Poker (WSOP). He made the final table in the $2,000 No Limit Hold'em event at the 2007 World Series of Poker won by Will Durkee. A year later on June 6, 2008 Banducci won his first World Series of Poker bracelet after defeating European Poker Tour Grand Champion Jeff Williams during heads-up play at the $1,000 No Limit Holdem event at the 2008 World Series of Poker, earning $636,736. He won his second bracelet in an online event at the 2025 World Series of Poker, earning $77,653.

=== World Series of Poker bracelets ===
Year	Event	Prize Money
2008	$1,000 No-Limit Hold'em With Rebuys	$636,736
2025 O	$555 Pot Limit Omaha - PLO Bounty 6-Max	$77,653

An "O" following a year denotes bracelet(s) won during the World Series of Poker Online.
