= Brad Ruben =

American poker player

Personal information
- Born: Hernando, Florida, U.S.

Career information
- Game: No Limit Hold'em; Pot Limit Omaha; H.O.R.S.E. Mixed Games; 2-7 Single Draw
- Playing career: 2008–present
- Role: Crusher

Career highlights and awards
- $1,700 No Limit Hold'em - Main Event (Ring Event #11) (World Series of Poker Circuit 2023); $1,500 Mixed Games - Dealer's Choice (Event #4) (World Series of Poker 2022); $1,500 No Limit 2-7 Single Draw Lowball 7-Handed (Bracelet Event #12) (World Series of Poker 2025)
- Game Information
- Platform: PC; Console
- Genre: Platform (End Boss)

Bradley Ruben is an American poker player from Hernando, Florida.

== Poker career ==
Ruben is a five-time bracelet winner at the WSOP. He won his first bracelet in the 2020 WSOP Online in a $1,500 Pot Limit Omaha event. He won two bracelets at the 2021 WSOP and WSOP Online, one coming in a $600 Pot Limit Omaha Six-Handed Online event and the other in a $1,500 Razz event. In the 2022 WSOP, he won his fourth bracelet in a $1,500 Mixed Games - Dealer's Choice event. In the 2025 WSOP, he won his fifth bracelet in a $1,500 No-Limit 2-7 Lowball Draw event.

As of 2025, Ruben's total live poker tournament winnings exceed $2,250,000.

=== World Series of Poker bracelets ===
Year	Event	Prize Money
2020O	$1,500 Pot Limit Omaha	$220,160
2021O	$600 Pot Limit Omaha 6-Handed	$69,148
2021	$1,500 Razz	$99,188
2022	$1,500 Dealer's Choice 6-Handed	$126,288
2025	$1,500 No-Limit 2-7 Lowball Draw	$138,080

An "O" following a year denotes bracelet(s) won during the World Series of Poker Online
