= Brian Yoon =

American poker player

Brian Yoon is a professional poker player from Los Angeles, California.

== Poker career ==
Yoon's first major live cash came in the 2011 World Series of Poker Main Event, finishing 58th among 6,865 players for $130,997. Yoon won his first WSOP bracelet in the 2013 $1,111 No Limit Hold'em - Little One Drop for $663,727. In the next WSOP, Yoon won his second bracelet in the $5,000 No Limit Hold'em - Eight Handed Event for $633,341. In the 2017 WSOP, Yoon earned his third bracelet and largest live cash to date in the $1,500 No Limit Hold'em - Monster Stack Event. He bested 6,716 entries for $1,094,349. In the 2021 WSOP, he won the $10,000 Limit 2-7 Lowball Triple Draw Championship for $240,341 and his fourth bracelet. In the 2023 WSOP, he won his fifth bracelet in the $10,000 Seven Card Stud Championship Event for $311,433.

As of 2024, Yoon's total live poker tournament winnings exceed $6,500,000.

=== World Series of Poker bracelets ===
Year	Tournament	Prize (US$)
2013	$1,111 No-Limit Hold'em - The Little One for One Drop	$663,727
2014	$5,000 No-Limit Hold'em 8-Handed	$633,341
2017	$1,500 No-Limit Hold'em MONSTER STACK	$1,094,349
2021	$10,000 Limit 2-7 Lowball Triple Draw Championship	$240,341
2023	$10,000 Seven Card Stud Championship	$311,433
