= 2013 World Series of Poker results =

Below are the results for the 2013 World Series of Poker.

== Key ==
*	Elected to the Poker Hall of Fame
(#/#)	This denotes a bracelet winner. The first number is the number of bracelets won in the 2013 WSOP. The second number is the total number of bracelets won. Both numbers represent totals as of that point during the tournament.
Place	What place each player at the final table finished
Name	The player who made it to the final table
Prize (US$)	The amount of money awarded for each finish at the event's final table

== Results ==
=== Event #1: $500 Casino Employees No Limit Hold'em ===
- 2-Day Event: May 29-30
- Number of Entries: 898
- Total Prize Pool: $404,100
- Number of Payouts: 90
- Winning Hand: Q♥ 9♠

Final Table
Place	Name	Prize
1st	Chad Holloway (1/1)	$84,915
2nd	Allan Kwong	$52,318
3rd	Robert Rooney	$33,903
4th	Brian Pingel	$24,811
5th	Daniel Ellery	$18,426
6th	Sean Small	$13,868
7th	Tyrone Smith	$10,567
8th	Michael Trivett	$8,146
9th	Hieu Le	$6,348

=== Event #2: $5,000 No Limit Hold'em Eight Handed ===
- 4-Day Event: May 29-June 1
- Number of Entries: 481
- Total Prize Pool: $2,260,700
- Number of Payouts: 56
- Winning Hand: 5♠ 5♦

Final Table
Place	Name	Prize
1st	Trevor Pope (1/1)	$553,906
2nd	David Vamplew	$342,450
3rd	Darryll Fish	$215,286
4th	Jared Hamby	$154,518
5th	Jamie Armstrong	$112,695
6th	Dan Kelly (0/1)	$83,532
7th	Brandon Meyers	$62,915
8th	David Peters	$48,130

=== Event #3: $1,000 No Limit Hold'em Re-entry ===
- 3-Day Event: May 30-June 1
- Number of Entries: 3,164
- Total Prize Pool: $2,847,600
- Number of Payouts: 324
- Winning Hand: A♠ J♥

Final Table
Place	Name	Prize
1st	Charles Sylvestre (1/1)	$491,360
2nd	Seth Berger	$303,952
3rd	William Guerrero	$215,107
4th	Michael Cooper	$155,706
5th	Binh Ta	$114,017
6th	Ryan Olisar	$84,459
7th	Darren Rabinowitz	$63,273
8th	Ruben Ybarra	$47,925
9th	Ping Liu	$36,705

=== Event #4: $1,500 No Limit Hold'em Six Handed ===
- 3-Day Event: May 31-June 2
- Number of Entries: 1,069
- Total Prize Pool: $1,443,150
- Number of Payouts: 108
- Winning Hand: A♥ 8♥

Final Table
Place	Name	Prize
1st	John Beauprez (1/1)	$324,764
2nd	Manig Löser	$200,698
3rd	Eric Blair	$127,300
4th	Joe Cada (0/1)	$83,558
5th	Mike Mustafa	$56,499
6th	Keven Stammen (0/1)	$39,325

=== Event #5: $2,500 Omaha/Seven Card Stud Hi-Low 8-or Better ===
- 3-Day Event: May 31-June 2
- Number of Entries: 374
- Total Prize Pool: $850,850
- Number of Payouts: 40
- Winning Hand: J♦ 8♥ Q♥ K♥ 9♣ 10♠ X

Final Table
Place	Name	Prize
1st	Mike Gorodinsky (1/1)	$216,988
2nd	Kristopher Tong	$134,017
3rd	Matthew Ashton	$86,437
4th	Owais Ahmed (0/1)	$62,631
5th	George Fotiadis	$46,048
6th	George Danzer	$34,348
7th	Mack Lee	$25,993
8th	Julie Schneider	$19,952

=== Event #6: $1,500 Millionaire Maker No Limit Hold'em ===
- 4-Day Event: June 1-4
- Number of Entries: 6,343
- Total Prize Pool: $8,563,050
- Number of Payouts: 648
- Winning Hand: 9♥ 9♠

Final Table
Place	Name	Prize
1st	Benny Chen (1/1)	$1,199,104
2nd	Michael Bennington	$741,902
3rd	Jonathan Gray	$534,505
4th	Justin Liberto	$400,408
5th	Dan Kelly (0/1)	$302,104
6th	Chris Hunichen	$229,575
7th	Upeshka DeSilva	$175,714
8th	Robert McVeigh	$135,467
9th	Theron Eichenberger	$105,154

=== Event #7: $1,000 No Limit Hold'em ===
- 3-Day Event: June 2-4
- Number of Entries: 1,837
- Total Prize Pool: $1,653,300
- Number of Payouts: 198
- Winning Hand: A♥ 5♠

Final Table
Place	Name	Prize
1st	Matt Waxman (1/1)	$305,952
2nd	Eric Baldwin (0/1)	$189,220
3rd	Jess Dioquino	$130,825
4th	Amit Makhija	$94,353
5th	Brent Hanks (0/1)	$68,975
6th	Jacob Jung	$51,086
7th	Robert Dreyfuss	$38,340
8th	Tuu Ho	$29,147
9th	Jason Koon	$22,435

=== Event #8: $2,500 Eight Game Mix ===
- 3-Day Event: June 2-4
- Number of Entries: 388
- Total Prize Pool: $882,700
- Number of Payouts: 40
- Winning Hand: A♦ 10♦ 10♣ 9♥ (Pot Limit Omaha)

Final Table
Place	Name	Prize
1st	Michael Malm (1/1)	$225,104
2nd	Steven Wolansky	$139,034
3rd	Greg Mueller (0/2)	$89,673
4th	Eric Crain	$64,975
5th	Michael Hurey	$47,771
6th	Dario Alioto (0/1)	$35,634
7th	Mike Wattel (0/1)	$26,966
8th	Marco Johnson	$20,669

=== Event #9: $3,000 No Limit Hold'em Shootout ===
- 3-Day Event: June 3-5
- Number of Entries: 477
- Total Prize Pool: $1,302,210
- Number of Payouts: 60
- Winning Hand: A♠ 2♦

Final Table
Place	Name	Prize
1st	Cliff Josephy (1/2)	$299,486
2nd	Evan Silverstein	$185,487
3rd	Steven Silverman	$123,202
4th	Tim West	$91,428
5th	Alessandro Longobardi	$68,613
6th	David Baker (0/2)	$51,997
7th	Max Steinberg (0/1)	$39,756
8th	Chris Klodnicki	$30,641
9th	Ryan Hughes (0/2)	$23,791
10th	Simeon Naydenov	$18,609

=== Event #10: $1,500 Limit Hold'em ===
- 3-Day Event: June 3-5
- Number of Entries: 645
- Total Prize Pool: $870,750
- Number of Payouts: 72
- Winning Hand: A♣ 3♠

Final Table
Place	Name	Prize
1st	Brent Wheeler (1/1)	$191,605
2nd	Mark Meirkalns	$118,300
3rd	Malissia Zapata	$76,904
4th	Chiduziem Obi	$56,485
5th	Grayson Scoggin	$42,074
6th	William James	$31,747
7th	Brian Nichols	$24,232
8th	Alexander Queen	$18,703
9th	Eric Froehlich (0/2)	$14,585

=== Event #11: $2,500 No Limit Hold'em Six Handed ===
- 3-Day Event: June 4-6
- Number of Entries: 924
- Total Prize Pool: $2,102,100
- Number of Payouts: 108
- Winning Hand: K♣ K♠

Final Table
Place	Name	Prize
1st	Levi Berger (1/1)	$473,019
2nd	Scott Clements (0/2)	$292,339
3rd	Ben Palmer	$185,426
4th	Eddy Sabat	$121,711
5th	Jacob Bazeley	$82,297
6th	David Gonia	$57,282

=== Event #12: $1,500 Pot Limit Hold'em ===
- 3-Day Event: June 5-7
- Number of Entries: 535
- Total Prize Pool: $722,250
- Number of Payouts: 54
- Winning Hand: K♦ Q♠

Final Table
Place	Name	Prize
1st	Lev Rofman (1/1)	$166,136
2nd	Allen Cunningham (0/5)	$102,819
3rd	Jaspal Brar	$68,332
4th	Kenneth Shelton	$50,709
5th	Anthony Harb (0/1)	$38,055
6th	Eric Crain	$28,839
7th	Nicolas Halvorson	$22,050
8th	Timothy Reilly	$16,994
9th	Jean-Nicolas Fortin	$13,195

=== Event #13: $5,000 Seven Card Stud Hi-Low Split-8 or Better ===
- 3-Day Event: June 5-7
- Number of Entries: 210
- Total Prize Pool: $987,000
- Number of Payouts: 24
- Winning Hand: 9♥ 4♥ 9♣ 3♠ K♥ 5♦ K♦

Final Table
Place	Name	Prize
1st	Mike Matusow (1/4)	$266,503
2nd	Matthew Ashton	$164,700
3rd	Mike Leah	$108,412
4th	David Baker (0/2)	$79,078
5th	Yuval Bronshtein	$58,835
6th	Tony Cousineau	$44,543
7th	Gavin Smith (0/1)	$34,268
8th	Vladimir Shchemelev	$26,757

=== Event #14: $1,500 No Limit Hold'em ===
- 3-Day Event: June 6-8
- Number of Entries: 1,819
- Total Prize Pool: $2,455,650
- Number of Payouts: 198
- Winning Hand: K♠ 9♠

Final Table
Place	Name	Prize
1st	Jonathan Taylor (1/1)	$454,424
2nd	Blake Bohn	$281,049
3rd	Hunter Frey	$194,315
4th	Hiren Patel	$140,143
5th	Tuan Vu	$102,449
6th	Patrick Kubat	$75,879
7th	Jed Hoffman	$56,946
8th	Dan Gannon	$43,293
9th	Joseph Pergola	$33,323

=== Event #15: $1,500 H.O.R.S.E. ===
- 3-Day Event: June 7-9
- Number of Entries: 862
- Total Prize Pool: $1,163,700
- Number of Payouts: 96
- Winning Hand: 4♦ 9♥ 2♣ 5♠ 7 A 7 (Razz)

Final Table
Place	Name	Prize
1st	Tom Schneider (1/3)	$258,960
2nd	Owais Ahmed (0/1)	$159,950
3rd	Viatcheslav Ortynskiy	$108,701
4th	Rep Porter (0/2)	$75,652
5th	Frankie O'Dell (0/2)	$53,739
6th	Scott Bohlman	$38,949
7th	Eddie Blumenthal	$28,778
8th	Mark Klecan	$21,679

=== Event #16: $10,000 Heads Up No Limit Hold'em ===
- 3-Day Event: June 7-9
- Number of Entries: 162
- Total Prize Pool: $1,522,800
- Number of Payouts: 16
- Winning Hand: K♠ 9♠

Final Table
Place	Name	Prize
1st	Mark Radoja (1/2)	$331,190
2nd	Don Nguyen	$204,648
SF	Justin Bonomo	$110,485
SF	Ben Sulsky	$110,485
QF	Phil Hellmuth* (0/13)	$54,024
QF	Randy Lew	$54,024
QF	Sean Winter	$54,024
QF	Russell Rosenblum	$54,024

=== Event #17: $1,500 No Limit Hold'em ===
- 3-Day Event: June 8-10
- Number of Entries: 2,105
- Total Prize Pool: $2,841,750
- Number of Payouts: 216
- Winning Hand: Q♦ J♥

Final Table
Place	Name	Prize
1st	Athanasios Polychronopoulos (1/2)	$518,755
2nd	Manuel Mutke	$322,908
3rd	Everett Carlton	$224,455
4th	Joe Cada (0/1)	$161,652
5th	Samuel Taylor	$118,145
6th	Michael Kurth	$87,398
7th	Joseph Ward	$65,502
8th	David Baker (0/2)	$49,716
9th	Thomas Nicotera	$38,178

=== Event #18: $1,000 No Limit Hold'em ===
- 3-Day Event: June 9-11
- Number of Entries: 2,071
- Total Prize Pool: $1,863,900
- Number of Payouts: 216
- Winning Hand: A♦ 5♦

Final Table
Place	Name	Prize
1st	Taylor Paur (1/1)	$340,260
2nd	Roy Weiss	$211,794
3rd	Tai Nguyen	$147,220
4th	Alexander Barlow	$106,027
5th	D.J. MacKinnon	$77,491
6th	Phil Hui	$57,324
7th	Daniel Idema (0/1)	$42,962
8th	Ryan Austin	$32,608
9th	Kyle Cartwright	$25,041

=== Event #19: $5,000 Pot Limit Hold'em ===
- 3-Day Event: June 9-11
- Number of Entries: 195
- Total Prize Pool: $916,500
- Number of Payouts: 27
- Winning Hand: J♣ J♦

Final Table
Place	Name	Prize
1st	Davidi Kitai (1/2)	$224,560
2nd	Cary Katz	$138,794
3rd	Vincent Bartello	$103,628
4th	Dimitar Danchev	$77,893
5th	Eugene Katchalov (0/1)	$58,912
6th	Kristina Holst	$44,844
7th	Bertrand Grospellier (0/1)	$34,341
8th	Dario Minieri (0/1)	$26,468
9th	Chris Johnson	$20,520

=== Event #20: $1,500 Omaha Hi-Low Split-8 or Better ===
- 4-Day Event: June 10-13
- Number of Entries: 1,014
- Total Prize Pool: $1,368,900
- Number of Payouts: 117
- Winning Hand: K♣ K♠ A♥ 3♣

Final Table
Place	Name	Prize
1st	Calen McNeil (1/1)	$277,274
2nd	Can Kim Hua	$171,577
3rd	Todd Brunson (0/1)	$107,349
4th	Joe Ford	$77,917
5th	Tony Ma (0/2)	$57,521
6th	Stephen Chidwick	$43,120
7th	John Monnette (0/2)	$32,798
8th	Won Goag	$25,283
9th	Dao Bac (0/1)	$19,753

=== Event #21: $3,000 No Limit Hold'em Six Handed ===
- 3-Day Event: June 11-13
- Number of Entries: 807
- Total Prize Pool: $2,205,840
- Number of Payouts: 90
- Winning Hand: Q♠ Q♣

Final Table
Place	Name	Prize
1st	Martin Finger (1/1)	$506,764
2nd	Matt Stout	$313,370
3rd	Matt Berkey	$199,733
4th	David Pham (0/2)	$131,679
5th	Nikolai Sears	$89,402
6th	Andrew Dean	$62,458

=== Event #22: $1,500 Pot Limit Omaha ===
- 3-Day Event: June 12-14
- Number of Entries: 1,022
- Total Prize Pool: $1,378,350
- Number of Payouts: 117
- Winning Hand: 9♥ 7♣ 5♣ 6♦

Final Table
Place	Name	Prize
1st	Josh Pollock (1/1)	$279,431
2nd	Noah Schwartz	$172,931
3rd	James Park	$108,196
4th	K.T. Park	$78,532
5th	Shawn Silber	$57,974
6th	Eric Shanks	$43,460
7th	Eddie Blumenthal	$33,057
8th	David Greene	$25,483
9th	Brandon Crawford	$19,909

=== Event #23: $2,500 Seven Card Stud ===
- 3-Day Event: June 12-14
- Number of Entries: 246
- Total Prize Pool: $559,650
- Number of Payouts: 32
- Winning Hand: J♦ 10♣ 8♠ J♣ 3♠ 7♦ 10♥

Final Table
Place	Name	Prize
1st	David Chiu (1/5)	$145,520
2nd	Scott Seiver (0/1)	$89,980
3rd	Freddie Ellis (0/1)	$59,127
4th	Michael Mizrachi (0/3)	$43,188
5th	Frank Kassela (0/2)	$31,978
6th	Gary Benson (0/1)	$24,003
7th	Matthew Ashton	$18,266
8th	Adam Friedman (0/1)	$14,086

=== Event #24: $1,500 No Limit Hold'em ===
- 3-Day Event: June 13-15
- Number of Entries: 1,731
- Total Prize Pool: $2,336,850
- Number of Payouts: 198
- Winning Hand: A♠ 7♠

Final Table
Place	Name	Prize
1st	Corey Harrison (1/1)	$432,411
2nd	Daniel Cascado	$267,452
3rd	Salvatore DiCarlo	$184,914
4th	Paul Spitzberg	$133,364
5th	Gregory Josifovski	$97,493
6th	Mohsin Charania	$72,208
7th	Zimnan Ziyard	$54,191
8th	Gareth Teatum	$41,198
9th	Robert Brewer	$31,711

=== Event #25: $5,000 Omaha Hi-Low Split-8 or Better ===
- 3-Day Event: June 13-15
- Number of Entries: 241
- Total Prize Pool: $1,132,700
- Number of Payouts: 27
- Winning Hand: 7♣ 6♠ 3♥ 2♥

Final Table
Place	Name	Prize
1st	Danny Fuhs (1/1)	$277,519
2nd	Christopher George	$171,536
3rd	Robert Mizrachi (0/1)	$128,074
4th	Brian Hastings (0/1)	$96,268
5th	Viacheslav Zhukov (0/2)	$72,809
6th	Arthur Kargen	$55,423
7th	Jeff Lisandro (0/5)	$42,442
8th	Ryan Lenaghan	$32,712
9th	Bart Hanson	$25,361

=== Event #26: $1,000 Seniors No Limit Hold'em Championship ===
- 3-Day Event: June 14-16
- Number of Entries: 4,407
- Total Prize Pool: $3,966,300
- Number of Payouts: 441
- Winning Hand: J♠ 9♥

Final Table
Place	Name	Prize
1st	Kenneth Lind (1/1)	$634,809
2nd	Dana Ott	$390,601
3rd	John Holley	$283,312
4th	Barry Bashist	$209,856
5th	Randolph Spain	$156,629
6th	Michel Bouskila	$117,799
7th	James Miller	$89,281
8th	Jack Ernest Ward	$68,180
9th	Fernando Halac	$52,474

=== Event #27: $3,000 Mixed Max No Limit Hold'em ===
- 4-Day Event: June 14-17
- Number of Entries: 593
- Total Prize Pool: $1,618,890
- Number of Payouts: 68
- Winning Hand: A♣ 8♣

Final Table
Place	Name	Prize
1st	Isaac Hagerling (1/1)	$372,387
2nd	Max Steinberg (0/1)	$231,501
SF	Jeremy Ausmus	$132,748
SF	Jason Koon	$132,748
QF	Yevgeniy Timoshenko	$51,561
QF	Dan Healey	$51,561
QF	Chris Johnson	$51,561
QF	Brandon Cantu (0/2)	$51,561

=== Event #28: $1,500 No Limit Hold'em ===
- 3-Day Event: June 15-17
- Number of Entries: 2,115
- Total Prize Pool: $2,855,250
- Number of Payouts: 216
- Winning Hand: Q♦ 8♦

Final Table
Place	Name	Prize
1st	Jason Duval (1/1)	$521,202
2nd	Majid Yahyaei	$324,442
3rd	Masayuki Nagata	$225,521
4th	James Lee	$162,420
5th	Tommy Townsend	$118,707
6th	Dan Martin	$87,813
7th	Stephen Bartlett	$65,813
8th	Daniel Bishop	$49,952
9th	Joseph Cappuccio	$38,360

=== Event #29: $5,000 H.O.R.S.E. ===
- 4-Day Event: June 15-18
- Number of Entries: 261
- Total Prize Pool: $1,226,700
- Number of Payouts: 32
- Winning Hand: A♦ 10♥ (Hold'em)

Final Table
Place	Name	Prize
1st	Tom Schneider (2/4)	$318,955
2nd	Benjamin Scholl (0/1)	$197,228
3rd	Greg Mueller (0/2)	$129,600
4th	Viatcheslav Ortynskiy	$94,664
5th	Chris Klodnicki	$70,093
6th	Adam Friedman (0/1)	$52,613
7th	David Benyamine (0/1)	$40,039
8th	Konstantin Puchkov (0/1)	$30,876

=== Event #30: $1,000 No Limit Hold'em ===
- 3-Day Event: June 16-18
- Number of Entries: 2,108
- Total Prize Pool: $1,897,200
- Number of Payouts: 216
- Winning Hand: A♥ 7♠

Final Table
Place	Name	Prize
1st	Chris Dombrowski (1/1)	$346,332
2nd	Mathew Moore	$215,578
3rd	Jesse McEuen	$149,850
4th	Dimitar Yosifov	$107,922
5th	Carter Myers	$78,876
6th	Chris Bolek	$58,348
7th	Matt Seer	$43,730
8th	Mike Pickett	$33,191
9th	Jonathan Thompson	$25,488

=== Event #31: $1,500 Pot Limit Omaha Hi-Low Split-8 or Better ===
- 3-Day Event: June 17-19
- Number of Entries: 936
- Total Prize Pool: $1,263,600
- Number of Payouts: 117
- Winning Hand: 4♥ 7♦ 3♠ A♣

Final Table
Place	Name	Prize
1st	Jarred Graham (1/1)	$255,942
2nd	Marco Johnson	$158,379
3rd	Barry Greenstein* (0/3)	$99,091
4th	Noomis Jones	$71,924
5th	Gabriel Blumenthal	$53,096
6th	Loni Harwood	$39,803
7th	Eric Rodawig (0/1)	$30,275
8th	Joao Simao	$23,338
9th	Perry Green (0/3)	$18,233

=== Event #32: $5,000 No Limit Hold'em Six Handed ===
- 3-Day Event: June 18-20
- Number of Entries: 516
- Total Prize Pool: $2,425,200
- Number of Payouts: 54
- Winning Hand: A♦ A♣

Final Table
Place	Name	Prize
1st	Erick Lindgren (1/2)	$606,317
2nd	Lee Markholt	$374,960
3rd	Jonathan Little	$238,833
4th	Connor Drinan	$157,274
5th	Vasile Buboi	$106,830
6th	Ryan D'Angelo	$74,768

=== Event #33: $2,500 Seven Card Razz ===
- 3-Day Event: June 18-20
- Number of Entries: 301
- Total Prize Pool: $684,775
- Number of Payouts: 32
- Winning Hand: A-3-4-4-6-10-8

Final Table
Place	Name	Prize
1st	Bryan Campanello (1/1)	$178,052
2nd	David Bach (0/1)	$110,098
3rd	Jim Wheatley	$72,346
4th	Sebastian Pauli	$52,844
5th	Ivan Schertzer	$39,128
6th	Brent Keller	$29,369
7th	Rick Fuller	$22,351
8th	Ismael Bojang	$17,235

=== Event #34: $1,000 Turbo No Limit Hold'em ===
- 2-Day Event: June 19-20
- Number of Entries: 1,629
- Total Prize Pool: $1,466,100
- Number of Payouts: 171
- Winning Hand: A♥ 9♦

Final Table
Place	Name	Prize
1st	Michael Gathy (1/2)	$278,613
2nd	Benjamin Reason	$172,252
3rd	Yueqi Zhu	$113,358
4th	Sergey Rybachenko	$81,720
5th	Daniel Bishop	$59,816
6th	Jason Duval (1/1)	$44,422
7th	Jake Cody (0/1)	$33,456
8th	Noah Vaillancourt	$25,539
9th	Russell Crane	$19,748

=== Event #35: $3,000 Pot Limit Omaha ===
- 3-Day Event: June 19-21
- Number of Entries: 640
- Total Prize Pool: $1,747,200
- Number of Payouts: 72
- Winning Hand: A♦ K♣ J♠ 9♠

Final Table
Place	Name	Prize
1st	Jeff Madsen (1/3)	$384,420
2nd	Douglas Corning	$237,374
3rd	Michal Maryska	$154,312
4th	Danny Hannawa	$113,340
5th	Scott Clements (0/2)	$84,424
6th	Ryan Chapman	$63,702
7th	William Black	$48,624
8th	Joni Jouhkimainen	$37,529
9th	Jason DeWitt (0/1)	$29,265

=== Event #36: $1,500 No Limit Hold'em Shootout ===
- 3-Day Event: June 20-22
- Number of Entries: 1,194
- Total Prize Pool: $1,611,900
- Number of Payouts: 120
- Winning Hand: K♠ 8♠

Final Table
Place	Name	Prize
1st	Simeon Naydenov (1/1)	$326,440
2nd	Jake Schwartz	$202,035
3rd	Andrew Kloc	$126,250
4th	Tobias Wenker	$91,749
5th	Nacho Barbero	$67,732
6th	Mike Watson	$50,774
7th	Jan Kropacek	$38,621
8th	Salman Behbehani	$29,771
9th	Noah Bronstein	$23,259

=== Event #37: $5,000 Limit Hold'em ===
- 3-Day Event: June 20-22
- Number of Entries: 170
- Total Prize Pool: $799,000
- Number of Payouts: 18
- Winning Hand: 10♠ 4♣

Final Table
Place	Name	Prize
1st	Michael Moore (1/1)	$211,743
2nd	Gabriel Nassif	$130,852
3rd	Ronnie Bardah (0/1)	$94,793
4th	Brian Aleksa	$69,968
5th	Todd Witteles (0/1)	$52,582
6th	Dom Denotaristefani	$40,205
7th	Ben Yu	$31,264
8th	Greg Mueller (0/2)	$24,721
9th	Justin Bonomo	$19,863

=== Event #38: $2,500 No Limit Hold'em Four Handed ===
- 3-Day Event: June 21-23
- Number of Entries: 566
- Total Prize Pool: $1,287,650
- Number of Payouts: 64
- Winning Hand: K♠ 4♦

Final Table
Place	Name	Prize
1st	Justin Oliver (1/1)	$309,071
2nd	Nick Schwarmann	$191,434
3rd	Jared Jaffee	$129,447
4th	David Pham (0/2)	$89,736

=== Event #39: $1,500 Seven Card Stud Hi-Low-8 or Better ===
- 3-Day Event: June 21-23
- Number of Entries: 558
- Total Prize Pool: $753,300
- Number of Payouts: 56
- Winning Hand: K♣ K♥ 2♥ 9♥ 5♣ 3♣ J♠

Final Table
Place	Name	Prize
1st	Daniel Idema (1/2)	$184,590
2nd	Joseph Hertzog	$114,109
3rd	Raul Paez	$71,736
4th	Matt Vengrin	$51,488
5th	Mike Leah	$37,552
6th	Tony Gill	$27,834
7th	Fei Chu	$20,964
8th	Artie Cobb (0/4)	$16,037

=== Event #40: $1,500 No Limit Hold'em ===
- 3-Day Event: June 22-24
- Number of Entries: 2,161
- Total Prize Pool: $2,917,350
- Number of Payouts: 243
- Winning Hand: K♠ 10♦

Final Table
Place	Name	Prize
1st	Jared Hamby (1/1)	$525,272
2nd	Peter Hengsakul	$325,780
3rd	Allan Vrooman	$230,178
4th	Nicolas Fierro	$165,501
5th	Joao Dorneles Neto	$120,574
6th	Matt Berkey	$89,008
7th	Richard Dubini	$66,544
8th	Fred Berger (0/1)	$50,382
9th	David Nicholson	$38,625

=== Event #41: $5,000 Pot Limit Omaha Six Handed ===
- 3-Day Event: June 22-24
- Number of Entries: 400
- Total Prize Pool: $1,880,000
- Number of Payouts: 42
- Winning Hand: 10♥ 8♠ 7♦ 4♠

Final Table
Place	Name	Prize
1st	Steve Gross (1/1)	$488,817
2nd	Salman Behbehani	$301,965
3rd	Timo Pfutzenreuter	$194,147
4th	Joseph Leung	$128,742
5th	Lee Goldman	$87,890
6th	Nader Arfai	$61,739

=== Event #42: $1,000 No Limit Hold'em ===
- 3-Day Event: June 23-25
- Number of Entries: 2,100
- Total Prize Pool: $1,890,000
- Number of Payouts: 216
- Winning Hand: A♣ 10♦

Final Table
Place	Name	Prize
1st	Norbert Szecsi (1/1)	$345,037
2nd	Denis Gnidash	$214,760
3rd	Chris DeMaci	$149,281
4th	Kirby Martin	$107,512
5th	Rory Mathews	$78,576
6th	Bryce Landier	$58,126
7th	Ariel Celestino	$43,564
8th	Dana Buck	$33,065
9th	Jonathan Bennett	$25,392

=== Event #43: $10,000 2-7 Draw Lowball (No Limit) ===
- 3-Day Event: June 23-25
- Number of Entries: 87
- Total Prize Pool: $817,800
- Number of Payouts: 14
- Winning Hand: 10-8-7-3-2

Final Table
Place	Name	Prize
1st	Jesse Martin (1/1)	$253,524
2nd	David Baker (0/2)	$156,674
3rd	Konstantin Puchkov (0/1)	$99,313
4th	Jeff Lisandro (0/5)	$67,264
5th	Jon Turner	$47,792
6th	Layne Flack (0/6)	$35,549
7th	John Hennigan (0/2)	$27,633

=== Event #44: $3,000 No Limit Hold'em ===
- 3-Day Event: June 24-26
- Number of Entries: 1,072
- Total Prize Pool: $2,926,560
- Number of Payouts: 117
- Winning Hand: A♣ 3♥

Final Table
Place	Name	Prize
1st	Sandeep Pulusani (1/1)	$592,684
2nd	Niall Farrell	$366,815
3rd	Michael Rocco	$229,500
4th	Martin Hanowski	$166,579
5th	Zo Karim	$122,974
6th	Mark Teltscher	$92,186
7th	Nam Le	$70,120
8th	Pedro Rios	$54,053
9th	Philippe Vert	$42,230

=== Event #45: $1,500 Ante Only No Limit Hold'em ===
- 3-Day Event: June 25-27
- Number of Entries: 678
- Total Prize Pool: $915,300
- Number of Payouts: 72
- Winning Hand: 6♣ 3♣

Final Table
Place	Name	Prize
1st	Ben Volpe (1/1)	$201,399
2nd	Paul Lieu	$124,352
3rd	Louis Bonnecaze (0/2)	$80,839
4th	Blair Hinkle (0/1)	$59,375
5th	Chris Moorman	$44,227
6th	Horacio Chaves	$33,371
7th	Adam Stone	$25,472
8th	Daniel Johnson	$19,660
9th	Samuel Panzica	$15,331

=== Event #46: $3,000 Pot Limit Omaha Hi-Low Split-8 or Better ===
- 3-Day Event: June 25-27
- Number of Entries: 435
- Total Prize Pool: $1,187,550
- Number of Payouts: 45
- Winning Hand: A♦ 7♣ 2♠ 2♥

Final Table
Place	Name	Prize
1st	Vladimir Shchemelev (1/1)	$279,094
2nd	Mel Judah (0/2)	$172,361
3rd	Ashly Butler	$124,645
4th	Brian Hacker	$91,085
5th	John Cernuto (0/3)	$67,262
6th	Tyler Nelson	$50,197
7th	Andrey Zaichenko	$37,847
8th	Allyn Jaffrey Shulman (0/1)	$28,821
9th	Alexey Makarov	$22,171

=== Event #47: $111,111 One Drop High Rollers No Limit Hold'em ===
- 4-Day Event: June 26-29
- Number of Entries: 166
- Total Prize Pool: $17,891,148
- Number of Payouts: 24
- Winning Hand: 9♦ 2♥

Final Table
Place	Name	Prize
1st	Anthony Gregg (1/1)	$4,830,619
2nd	Chris Klodnicki	$2,985,495
3rd	Bill Perkins	$1,965,163
4th	Antonio Esfandiari (0/3)	$1,433,438
5th	Richard Fullerton	$1,066,491
6th	Martin Jacobson	$807,427
7th	Brandon Steven	$621,180
8th	Nick Schulman (0/2)	$485,029

=== Event #48: $2,500 Limit Hold'em Six Handed ===
- 3-Day Event: June 26-28
- Number of Entries: 343
- Total Prize Pool: $780,325
- Number of Payouts: 36
- Winning Hand: A♦ 5♠

Final Table
Place	Name	Prize
1st	Marco Johnson (1/1)	$206,796
2nd	Jeff Thompson	$127,801
3rd	Juha Helppi	$82,956
4th	Danny Warchol	$55,457
5th	Michael Schiffman	$38,095
6th	Maria Ho	$26,858

=== Event #49: $1,500 No Limit Hold'em ===
- 3-Day Event: June 27-29
- Number of Entries: 2,247
- Total Prize Pool: $3,033,450
- Number of Payouts: 243
- Winning Hand: 10♣ 10♠

Final Table
Place	Name	Prize
1st	Barny Boatman (1/1)	$546,080
2nd	Brian O'Donoghue	$338,745
3rd	Van Tran	$239,339
4th	Taras Kripps	$172,087
5th	Aditya Prasetyo	$125,372
6th	Robin Ylitalo	$92,550
7th	Paul DaSilva	$69,192
8th	Noah Sandler	$52,387
9th	Roger Lussier	$40,162

=== Event #50: $2,500 10-Game Mix Six Handed ===
- 3-Day Event: June 27-29
- Number of Entries: 372
- Total Prize Pool: $846,300
- Number of Payouts: 42
- Winning Hand: A♥ A♦

Final Table
Place	Name	Prize
1st	Brandon Wong (1/1)	$220,061
2nd	Sebastian Saffari	$135,932
3rd	Philip Sternheimer	$87,397
4th	Christopher George	$57,954
5th	Scott Abrams	$39,564
6th	Loren Klein	$27,792

=== Event #51: $1,000 Ladies No Limit Hold'em Championship ===
- 3-Day Event: June 28-30
- Number of Entries: 954
- Total Prize Pool: $858,600
- Number of Payouts: 117
- Winning Hand: A♣ K♣

Final Table
Place	Name	Prize
1st	Kristen Bicknell (1/1)	$173,922
2nd	Leanne Haas	$107,616
3rd	Julie Monsacre	$67,331
4th	Shana Matthews	$48,871
5th	Connie Bruce	$36,078
6th	Eleanor Gudger	$27,045
7th	Amanda Baker	$20,572
8th	Chris Priday	$15,858
9th	Cindy Kerslake	$12,389

=== Event #52: $25,000 No Limit Hold'em Six Handed ===
- 3-Day Event: June 28-30
- Number of Entries: 175
- Total Prize Pool: $4,156,250
- Number of Payouts: 18
- Winning Hand: J♣ 10♦

Final Table
Place	Name	Prize
1st	Steve Sung (1/2)	$1,205,324
2nd	Phil Galfond (0/1)	$744,841
3rd	Dani Stern	$509,473
4th	Stephen Chidwick	$353,780
5th	Max Lehmanski	$249,291
6th	Richard Lyndaker	$178,261

=== Event #53: $1,500 No Limit Hold'em ===
- 4-Day Event: June 29-July 2
- Number of Entries: 2,816
- Total Prize Pool: $3,801,600
- Number of Payouts: 297
- Winning Hand: A♠ 9♥

Final Table
Place	Name	Prize
1st	Brett Shaffer (1/1)	$665,397
2nd	David Vamplew	$413,157
3rd	Arttu Raekorpi	$291,392
4th	Loni Harwood	$210,456
5th	Mike Watson	$153,850
6th	Diego Zeiter	$113,819
7th	Jonathan Cohen	$85,193
8th	Darren Rabinowitz	$64,513
9th	Matias Ruzzi	$49,420

=== Event #54: $1,000 No Limit Hold'em ===
- 3-Day Event: June 30-July 2
- Number of Entries: 2,883
- Total Prize Pool: $2,594,700
- Number of Payouts: 297
- Winning Hand: 9♦ 5♥

Final Table
Place	Name	Prize
1st	Dana Castaneda (1/1)	$454,207
2nd	Jason Bigelow	$281,991
3rd	Matthias Bednarek	$198,883
4th	Michael Zucchet	$143,642
5th	Philippe Clerc	$105,007
6th	Barry Hutter	$77,685
7th	Jacob Bazeley	$58,147
8th	Joseph Wertz	$44,032
9th	Kenneth Gregersen	$33,731

=== Event #55: $50,000 The Poker Players Championship ===
- 5-Day Event: June 30-July 4
- Number of Entries: 132
- Total Prize Pool: $6,336,000
- Number of Payouts: 16
- Winning Hand: K♣ 10♦ (Limit Hold'em)

Final Table
Place	Name	Prize
1st	Matthew Ashton (1/1)	$1,774,089
2nd	Don Nguyen	$1,096,254
3rd	John Hennigan (0/2)	$686,568
4th	David Benyamine (0/1)	$497,122
5th	George Danzer	$388,523
6th	Minh Ly	$309,830
7th	Mike Wattel (0/1)	$251,602
8th	Jonathan Duhamel (0/1)	$207,630

=== Event #56: $2,500 No Limit Hold'em ===
- 4-Day Event: July 1-4
- Number of Entries: 1,736
- Total Prize Pool: $3,949,400
- Number of Payouts: 198
- Winning Hand: A♥ 2♥

Final Table
Place	Name	Prize
1st	Nikolaus Teichert (1/1)	$730,756
2nd	Vincent Maglio	$452,008
3rd	Dan Owen	$312,516
4th	Sergey Lebedev	$225,392
5th	Josh Arieh (0/2)	$164,768
6th	Kirill Rabtsov	$122,036
7th	Nicolas Faure	$91,586
8th	Sebastien Comel	$69,627
9th	Nicolas Levi	$53,593

=== Event #57: $5,000 No Limit Hold'em ===
- 4-Day Event: July 2-5
- Number of Entries: 784
- Total Prize Pool: $3,684,800
- Number of Payouts: 81
- Winning Hand: K♣ Q♦

Final Table
Place	Name	Prize
1st	Matt Perrins (1/2)	$792,275
2nd	Arthur Pro	$489,451
3rd	Seth Berger	$315,529
4th	Antonio Buonanno	$231,147
5th	Matt Berkey	$171,822
6th	Thomas Muehloecker	$129,447
7th	Randal Flowers	$98,715
8th	Joe Serock	$76,164
9th	Kent Roed	$59,398

=== Event #58: $1,111 The Little One for One Drop No Limit Hold'em ===
- 5-Day Event: July 3-7
- Number of Entries: 4,756
- Total Prize Pool: $4,280,400
- Number of Payouts: 495
- Winning Hand: K♣ Q♣

Final Table
Place	Name	Prize
1st	Brian Yoon (1/1)	$663,727
2nd	Cuong Van Nguyen	$408,264
3rd	Roland Israelashvili	$295,433
4th	Justin Zaki	$218,771
5th	Henry Tran	$163,340
6th	Joseph Morneau	$122,933
7th	Kevin O'Donnell	$93,269
8th	Alexander Case	$71,311
9th	Adriano Santa Ana	$54,960

=== Event #59: $2,500 2-7 Triple Draw Lowball (Limit) ===
- 3-Day Event: July 3-5
- Number of Entries: 282
- Total Prize Pool: $641,550
- Number of Payouts: 30
- Winning Hand: 9-8-6-5-2

Final Table
Place	Name	Prize
1st	Eli Elezra (1/2)	$173,236
2nd	Daniel Negreanu (1/5)	$107,055
3rd	Brian Brubaker	$70,743
4th	David Chiu (1/5)	$48,077
5th	David Baker (0/1)	$33,399
6th	Scott Seiver (0/1)	$23,698

=== Event #60: $1,500 No Limit Hold'em ===
- 3-Day Event: July 5-7
- Number of Entries: 2,541
- Total Prize Pool: $3,430,350
- Number of Payouts: 270
- Winning Hand: J♦ 10♦

Final Table
Place	Name	Prize
1st	Loni Harwood (1/1)	$609,017
2nd	Yongshuo Zheng	$378,607
3rd	Mika Paasonen	$267,978
4th	Yngve Steen	$193,265
5th	Asi Moshe	$141,124
6th	Daniel Cascado	$104,282
7th	Cy Williams	$78,006
8th	Bijon Notash	$59,036
9th	Hiren Patel	$45,212

=== Event #61: $10,000 Pot Limit Omaha ===
- 3-Day Event: July 5-7
- Number of Entries: 386
- Total Prize Pool: $3,628,400
- Number of Payouts: 45
- Winning Hand: 10♦ 10♣ 4♣ 3♥

Final Table
Place	Name	Prize
1st	Daniel Alaei (1/4)	$852,692
2nd	Jared Bleznick	$526,625
3rd	James Wiese	$380,836
4th	Tom Marchese	$278,298
5th	Numit Agrawal	$205,512
6th	Gjergj Sinishtaj	$153,372
7th	Sean Dempsey	$115,637
8th	Rory Rees Brennan	$88,061
9th	Alex Kravchenko (0/1)	$67,742

=== Event #62: $10,000 No Limit Hold'em Main Event ===
- 10-Day Event: July 6-15
- Final Table: November 4-5
- Number of Entries: 6,352
- Total Prize Pool: $59,708,800
- Number of Payouts: 648
- Winning Hand: A♥ K♥

Final Table
Place	Name	Prize
1st	Ryan Riess (1/1)	$8,361,570
2nd	Jay Farber	$5,174,357
3rd	Amir Lehavot (0/1)	$3,727,823
4th	Sylvain Loosli	$2,792,533
5th	J.C. Tran (0/2)	$2,106,893
6th	Marc Etienne McLaughlin	$1,601,024
7th	Michiel Brummelhuis	$1,225,356
8th	David Benefield	$944,650
9th	Mark Newhouse	$733,224
