= RankingHero =

RankingHero is a ranking and social networking site for the poker community. It hosts an extensive live poker database and an interactive social platform linking all actors in the poker industry - from online operators and live poker venues, through professional players and industry leaders, to recreational players and fans.

== History ==
In 2011, professional poker player Pedro Canali decided to partner with Adrien Bacchi and his IT team to develop a platform providing a large poker tournament database combined with an upmarket social network.

In 2012, the successful businessman Bruno Vanryb (founder of Avanquest Software) joined the team, followed in early 2013 by French poker pro Nicolas Levi, presently RankingHero CCO.

Bruno Vanryb: “It all comes from poker pro Pedro Canali, whom I met at the poker table during tournaments. I am a recreational player and one of my good friends, Jacques Zaicik (note: friend and mentor of ElkY) advised me to take some poker coaching to enhance my level of play, and Pedro was the right guy; he coached me quite successfully. We became good friends and I loved his project at once.”

In 2013, things picked up speed when more big names came into play: Bruno Fitoussi, Lucille Cailly, Guillaume de La Gorce, and Renaud Desferet joined the roster of ambassadors for RankingHero.

The public beta release came in October 2013. In the summer of 2014 RankingHero marked its official U.S. launch in partnership with WPT500 and Aria Resort and Casino. In 2015 the website teamed with Unibet Open and the Bluff Europe British Poker Awards for its UK launch.

== The Database ==
Results and rankings are updated on a daily basis. Information is gathered through three main channels - directly from casinos and circuits; crowdsourcing (members can suggest and add results); and in partnership with data software such as The Tournament Director, CardRoomMagic, BravoLivePoker. As of July 2015, the database lists 421,232 players, 1,657,984 results, and 1545 venues.

== HeroScore ==
In 2015 RankingHero launched a unique three-dimensional ranking that assesses the results, popularity, and contribution of poker players. Using aggregated public data, it employs sophisticated algorithms to calculate the overall influence & prestige that a particular player has within the community. As the first composite ranking in poker which is based on objective data and community input, HeroScore allows members to endorse and upvote the achievements of their peers.

== Content provider ==
In addition to the daily updated results database, RankingHero.com provides a wide range of content - live poker news, rankings and schedules, player biographies, strategy articles by renowned pros, and an exclusive interview series featuring big names in the world of poker such as Antonio Esfandiari, Greg Raymer, Mike Sexton, Maria Ho, and others.

== Gamification ==
Nicolas Levi, RankingHero CCO, states: “RankingHero is leading the fight to transform poker marketing. Gamification, communities and big data are the 3 keys to the future of our industry.”

‘Missions’ (community contests) are a distinctive feature of this approach to ‘bringing back the fun in poker’ and have become a fixture on the site. Members interact and compete with each other not only in poker freerolls and tournaments but in a variety of competitions, ranging from hand analysis to guessing games.

== Partnerships ==
Current and past partnerships include joint projects with major poker tours, media, data software, and live venues: Bluff Europe, The Tournament Director, CardRoomMagic, LivingItLovingIt, Barriere Poker Tour, Aria, Bellagio, and others.

Since October 2014, as part of a partnership with Bluff Europe Magazine, the Bluff European Rankings have been powered by RankingHero.com.

The latest collaborations involve the authoritative twoplustwo and club poker forums and allow the integration of forum activity in players HeroScore.
