= Brian Rast =

American poker player (born 1981)

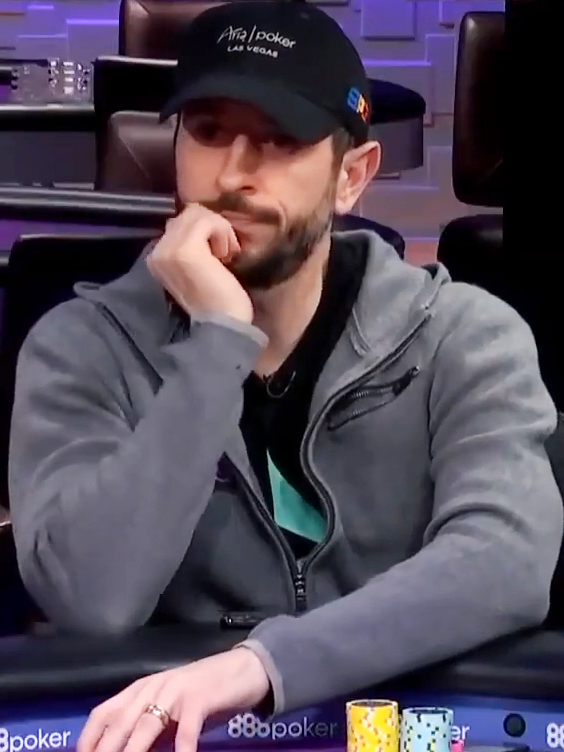
- Rast in 2018
- Nickname: tsarRast
- Born: November 8, 1981 (age 45); Denver, Colorado, U.S.

World Series of Poker
- Bracelets: 7
- Final tables: 23
- Money finishes: 89
- Highest WSOP Main Event finish: 24th, 2024

World Poker Tour
- Title: None
- Final table: 1
- Money finishes: 8

Brian Rast (born November 8, 1981) is a professional poker player living in Las Vegas, Nevada.

== Early personal life ==
Rast was born in Denver, Colorado but raised in Poway, California, where he graduated as valedictorian from Poway High School in 2000. He attended Stanford University before dropping out in order to pursue a career as a full-time poker professional in 2004.

In 2011, Rast married his wife, Juliana Karla Carlos da Silva.

== Online poker ==
In the online poker world, Rast is known as tsarrast on both Full Tilt Poker and PokerStars. Rast was primarily a cash game player online and played very few poker tournaments. He has very limited tournament results, playing a small volume in 2007 and again in 2016, and barely any in between. Despite the small volume, Rast has some impressive online tournament results, which include finishing third in Full Tilt Poker's FTOPS III Main Event in 2007 for $114,203.50., finishing third in PokerStars Sunday Million in 2008 for $73,490 and finishing third in a $2,100 NLHE SCOOP in 2016 for $155,600. Rast also produced some training videos online. He was one of the pros from the online poker training site Poker VT as well as RunItOnce.

== World Series of Poker ==
Rast made his first WSOP cash in 2005. Rast has seven World Series of Poker bracelets, two of which he won at the 2011 World Series of Poker. His first was in the $1,500 Pot-Limit Hold'em event, where he earned $227,232 after he defeated poker professional Allen Kessler heads-up,

Rast's second was in the $50,000 Players Championship, the second highest buy-in event, that awards third highest prize money of $1,720,328; also awarded is the David "Chip" Reese memorial trophy and what was described by Andrew Feldman of ESPN as "the most prestigious bracelet of the Series". The Players Championship started out with a field of 128 players and after four days of play in a mixed game format known as 8-Game, the format was switch to No-Limit Texas Hold'em on the fifth day, when the final table of eight was set with following noted poker professionals and where they finished: Ben Lamb (eighth), Scott Seiver (seventh), PokerStars Pro and SuperNova Elite George Lind (sixth), Matt Glantz (fifth), Owais Ahmed (fourth) and Minh Ly (third).

When heads-up play began, Rast was up against 11-time bracelet winner Phil Hellmuth, who was trying to capture his 12th bracelet in his third heads-up match of the 2011 series. As the match progressed, Hellmuth established a 5–1 chip lead on Rast; however, Rast gained the lead after a series of draws that failed to improve Hellmuth's hands. Rast captured the bracelet when Hellmuth's flush draw failed to improve against Rast's King high straight.

Rast's other results at the WSOP include a ninth-place finish in the 2008 World Series of Poker $5,000 Pot-Limit Omaha with Rebuys event for $84,863, 14th at the 2009 World Series of Poker in the $40,000 No-Limit Hold'em event for $128,665, and at the 2010 World Series of Poker he finished in the money, coming in 537th place out of 7,319 players for $24,079.

At the 2012 World Series of Poker, Rast made two final tables: sixth place in the $1,500 No Limit Hold'em Re-entry for $137,632 and sixth place in the $1,000,000 Big One for One Drop for $1,621,333.

Brian won his second Poker Players Championship bracelet at the 2016 World Series of Poker, beating Justin Bonomo heads up and winning $1,296,097.

At the 2018 World Series of Poker, Rast won his fourth bracelet, and $259,670, in the $10,000 No-Limit 2–7 Lowball Draw Championship event. Ten-time bracelet winner Doyle Brunson, four-time bracelet winner John Hennigan, and two-time bracelet winner Mike Wattel, whom Rast defeated in heads-up play, were among the players at the final table. In the 2021 WSOP, he won the $3,000 No Limit Hold'em 6-Handed event for $474,102 for his fifth bracelet. In the 2023 WSOP, he won the $50,000 Poker Player's Championship for $1,324,747.

=== World Series of Poker bracelets ===
Year	Event	Prize Money
2011	$1,500 Pot Limit Hold'em	$227,232
2011	$50,000 Poker Player's Championship	$1,720,328
2016	$50,000 Poker Player's Championship	$1,296,097
2018	$10,000 No-Limit 2–7 Lowball Draw Championship	$259,670
2021	$3,000 No Limit Hold'em 6-Handed	$474,102
2023	$50,000 Poker Player's Championship	$1,324,747
2025	$10,000 Razz Championship	$306,644

He was inducted to the Poker Hall of Fame as part of the Class of 2023.

== Other career results ==
From 2010–2014, Rast made regular trips to Macau to play cash games.

In December 2013, Brian won the World Poker Tour Doyle Brunson Five Diamond World Poker Classic $100,000 High Roller at the Bellagio by defeating Erik Seidel heads up for the title, taking home a prize of $1,083,500.

During the 2015 WSOP, Brian Rast won the 1st inaugural Super High Roller Bowl played at the Aria casino in Las Vegas, taking home over $7,500,000, besting Scott Seiver heads-up, and a 43 player field in total. It stands as his largest single tournament win.

As of 2025, his total live tournament earnings exceed $29,000,000. He has cashed for over $1 million in tournaments for seven years in a row (2011–2017).
