= Rettenmaier =

Rettenmaier is a German surname. Notable people with the surname include:

- Marvin Rettenmaier (born 1986), German professional poker player
- Travis Rettenmaier (born 1983), American professional tennis player
