= Matthew Ashton =

English poker player (born 1988)

- Nickname: MUSTAFABET
- Born: 8 June 1988 (age 38)

World Series of Poker
- Bracelet: 1
- Final tables: 6
- Money finishes: 13

European Poker Tour
- Money finish: 1

Matthew Ashton (born 8 June 1988) is a professional poker player from Liverpool, England, best known for winning the $50,000 Poker Player's Championship at the 2013 World Series of Poker.

== Highlights ==
Ashton began playing poker in 2003. Playing under the name "MUSTAFABET", he won a World Championship of Online Poker (WCOOP) event in 2009 in Pot-Limit Omaha for $86,000. His first World Series of Poker cash came in 2011, when he finished in 6th place in the $10,000 H.O.R.S.E. Championship. In 2013, he made 4 WSOP final tables, finishing in 2nd ($5,000 Seven Card Stud Hi-Low Split-8 or Better event #13), 3rd ($2,500 Omaha/Seven Card Stud Hi-Low 8-or Better event #5) and 7th ($2,500 Seven Card Stud event #23) before winning the $50,000 The Poker Players Championship (event #55). By winning this late event, he took over the lead in the WSOP Player of the Year race lead. He is the youngest champion in that event's 8-year history and the first non-American champion. His first three final tables in 2013 were in stud poker variants. His second-place finish in $5,000 Seven Card Stud Hi-Low came to Mike Matusow. His Poker Player's Championship came at a final table that included bracelet winners John Hennigan, David Benyamine, Mike Wattel, and Jonathan Duhamel as well as Minh Ly. The Championship was contested using an eight-game mix that included No Limit Hold’em, Limit Hold’em, Pot Limit Omaha, Omaha Hi-Lo, Seven card Stud, Seven card Stud Hi-Lo, Razz, and Deuce-to-Seven Triple Draw.

As of 2013, his total career live tournament winnings exceed $2,300,000. His 8 WSOP cashes account for $2,185,000 of those winnings. After winning the World Series of Poker bracelet for the $50,000 Poker Players Championship, he became the leader in the 2013 World Series of Poker Player of the Year race, but Daniel Negreanu reclaimed the lead at the end of the 2013 World Series of Poker Europe.

== World Series of Poker ==
World Series of Poker results
Year	Cashes	Final Tables	Bracelets
2011	2	1	0
2012	2	0	0
2013	4	4	1
2013 E	2	0	0
2014	2	1	0
2015	1	0	0

World Series of Poker bracelets
Year	Tournament	Prize (US$)
2013	$50,000 The Poker Player's Championship	$1,774,089
