= Marvin Rettenmaier =

German poker player (born 1986)

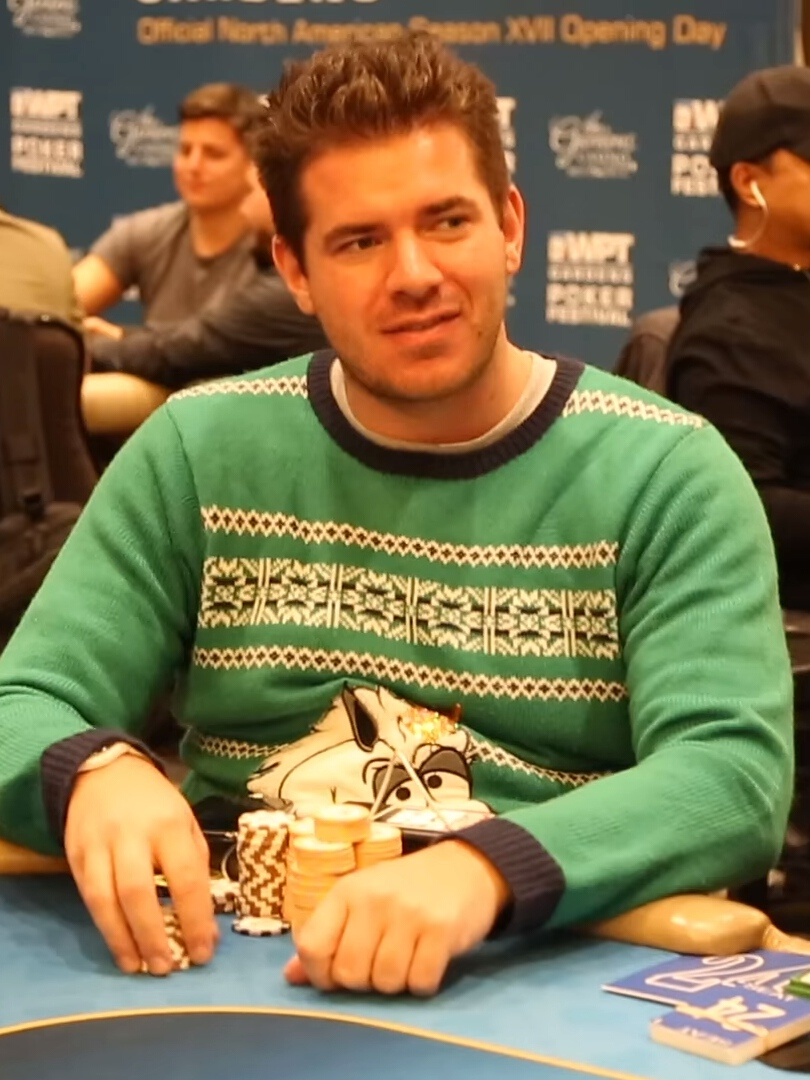

World Series of Poker
- Bracelet: None
- Money finishes: 24
- Highest WSOP Main Event finish: 99th, 2013

World Poker Tour
- Titles: 2
- Final tables: 5
- Money finishes: 18

European Poker Tour
- Title: None
- Final table: None
- Money finishes: 3

Marvin Rettenmaier (born 1986), is a professional poker player, originally from Leonberg, Germany.

== Poker career ==
Rettenmaier first appeared on the poker radar in December 2009, when he finished runner-up to Payman Mahourvand in the Main Event of the Christmas Poker Festival in Wisbaden, Germany. Over the next year, Rettenmaier made it through 10 major live tournaments. By the end of 2011, Marvin had already cashed a further 25 times and had a deal with Titan Poker. At that time he managed to do one of his bests scores - winning the French Poker Series Finale, February 2011. Marvin became widely known after winning the WPT Merit Cyprus Classic Main Event for more than $1,196,858. In an interview afterwards he said: "I feel amazing! I wanted this so bad and to actually do it is just...amazing!"

=== WSOP ===
Marvin Rettenmaier made 19 WSOP cashes. His first cash comes from June 2010 it was $1,500 No Limit Hold'em tournament, he got out at 7th position and cashed for 78,681 and by any chance this turned out to be his biggest cash also. Afterwards he made notable games and a lot of ITM. In an interview talking about his success in the WSOP fields he said: "I think Germans in general have a lot of discipline and they work hard. And now I think everybody’s scared of the Germans, so that helps a lot."

=== EPT ===
Marvin Rettenmaier is considered as one of the most successful EPT tournament players. Media often wrote about him: "One of the main reasons why? No matter the circumstances at the tables, you can almost always find him with a smile on his face." He has more than 10 EPT cashes and 3 Main Event cashes. His first EPT participation was in early 2010, he finished 6th for $7,117. His biggest EPT cash is from 2012, when he won the €10,300 No Limit Hold'em - High Roller 8 Handed Event for €365,300.

=== WPT ===
Rettenmaier won the WPT Season X World Championship. The final day he was playing against Philippe Ktorza and Michael Mizrachi. The game was long and tough, lasting more than eight hours and nearly 200 hands before the champion was crowned. For this victory, he got nearly $1,2 million in prize money and a gorgeous WPT trophy. This was his largest victory. Besides that he has 8 more notable WPT cashes.

=== Other participations ===
Marvin is often traveling to different parts of Europe and United States for playing poker. He has participated in more than 150 tournaments and cashed in more than 90.

=== Achievements ===
By 2012 he won the BLUFF - Player of The Year award. According to RankingHero he is 7th in Germany HeroScore popularity ranking system.
