= Mark Newhouse =

American poker player (born 1985)

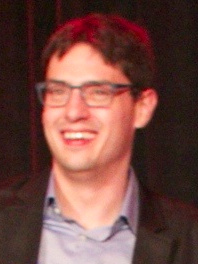
- Nickname: newhizzle
- Born: March 11, 1985 (age 41)

World Series of Poker
- Bracelet: None
- Final tables: 3
- Money finishes: 8
- Highest WSOP Main Event finish: 9th, 2013, 2014

World Poker Tour
- Title: 1
- Final table: 1
- Money finishes: 5

European Poker Tour
- Title: None
- Final table: None
- Money finish: 1

Mark Newhouse (born March 11, 1985) is an American professional poker player who made back-to-back final tables at the World Series of Poker Main Event in the 2013 and 2014 finishing ninth both times, making him the only player to make the November Nine twice before the format was abandoned. He beat a field of 6,352 and 6,683 respectively, outlasting 13,017 people in the process and was the first player to make back-to-back final tables in the Main Event since Dan Harrington in 2003 and 2004. The probability of Newhouse achieving back-to-back final tables is 1 in 524,079 (assuming all players have an equal chance).

== Early life ==
Newhouse was born in Chapel Hill, North Carolina and was a rebellious teenager. He dropped out of Appalachian State University his second year to pursue poker.

== Poker career ==
After making a $50 deposit on PartyPoker, Newhouse turned it into over $100,000 in one month and won an additional $100,000 the next month. He dropped out of school and began playing poker full-time. He won the 2006 Borgata WPT No Limit Hold'em Championship Event earning $1,519,020 and made over $2,000,000 his first year playing poker. He lost his winnings within a year and claims to have had poor bankroll management going broke several more times.

In 2013, Newhouse made the WSOP Main Event final table moving all in pre-flop holding 9♠ 9♣ against Ryan Riess's A♠ K♥. The board came K♦ 10♣ 7♠ 7♣ 6♦ eliminating Newhouse in 9th earning him $733,224. In 2014, he was again eliminated in 9th holding 10♣ 10♥ against Will Tonking's Q♣ Q♦ after moving all-in on the river with the board showing 2♦ 4♣ J♥ 4♥ J♣. He earned $730,725 for his finish.

As of 2014, his total live tournament winnings exceed $3,500,000, over $1,600,000 of his total winnings coming from cashes at the WSOP.
