= Bluff (magazine) =

Defunct American magazine

- Frequency: Monthly
- Founder: Eric Morris and Eddy Kleid
- Founded: June 2004
- First issue: October 2004
- Final issue: February 2015
- Company: Churchill Downs
- Country: United States
- Based in: Atlanta, Georgia
- Language: English
- Website: www.bluff.com
- ISSN: 1945-5550

Bluff was an American magazine specializing in the game of poker. Separate editions were also published for Europe, Latin America, South Africa and Australasia. The American edition began as a bimonthly in October 2004 and went monthly in August 2005. Production of the magazine was ceased in February 2015.

In December 2006, Bluff Magazine purchased thepokerdb.com, an online tournament database. Churchill Downs purchased Bluff Media in February 2012.

The magazine annually named the "Poker Power 20," the 20 most important people in the poker industry.

== Bluff Europe magazine ==
Bluff Europe magazine is a monthly European sister title to Bluff Magazine first published in March 2006. Printed in the United Kingdom and focusing more on the European poker circuit, regular contributors include professional players including Neil Channing, Liv Boeree, Tom Sambrook, Phil Laak, Antonio Esfandiari, and Mike Caro.

== Bluff Magazine South Africa ==
Bluff Magazine South Africa is an alternate monthly Southern African sister title to Bluff Magazine America. Published by Maverick Publishing Corp., Bluff Magazine SA focuses mainly on the poker industry in Southern Africa. Ryan Dreyer, top South African poker player and winner of the 2008 Sun City Millions poker tournament, is the editor.
