= The Poker Players Championship =

American poker tournament

Poker Players Championship
- Sport: Poker, 9-game mix
- Founded: Las Vegas, Nevada, U.S. (2006)
- Owner: Caesars Entertainment Corporation (2006–present)
- Most recent champion: (United Kingdom) Benny Glaser
- Most titles: (United States) Michael Mizrachi (4)
- Website: Official website

The Poker Players Championship is a $50,000 buy-in event at the World Series of Poker (WSOP). Added in 2010, it replaced the former $50,000 H.O.R.S.E. World Championship as the highest-stakes mixed-games event. It is considered among the most prestigious events on offer at the WSOP.

== History ==
In 2006, the inaugural event was called the $50,000 H.O.R.S.E. World Championship and was the largest buy-in tournament at the World Series of Poker until the introduction of the $1,000,000 Big One for One Drop in 2012. Chip Reese defeated Andy Bloch heads-up the 2006 H.O.R.S.E. World Championship to win $1,784,640 and the event's first title.

In 2007, professional poker player Freddy Deeb defeated Bruno Fitoussi after 17 hours of final table play to win $2,276,832 and his second bracelet. Chip Reese died in December 2007; efforts were made in 2008 to honor Reese by the WSOP which created the Chip Reese memorial trophy that each champion can hold for one year. Scotty Nguyen won the 2008 tournament and received the trophy. Controversy ensued when Nguyen, intoxicated during the final table of the tournament, began berating other players, notably Michael DeMichele, without receiving any penalty.

In 2010, $50,000 H.O.R.S.E. World Championship changed to the Poker Player's Championship and became the first 8-game mix version of the event. In 2015, the Poker Players Championship changed to a 10-game mix format. Unlike the previous five-game rotation of H.O.R.S.E. and the eight-game rotation that followed, the 10-game mix consisted of limit 2–7 triple draw lowball, limit Texas hold'em, limit Omaha/8B, limit razz, limit seven-card stud, limit seven card stud/8B, no-limit Texas hold'em with antes, pot-limit Omaha, badugi, and 2–7 no-limit draw lowball. The final table was played out exclusively in no-limit Texas hold'em in 2010 and 2011 to appeal to television viewers. The event has not been televised since and has been played out in a mixed-game format for its entire duration. After declining turnout for the 10-game version in 2015, the tournament reverted to the previous 8-game format and remained that way until 2021. In 2021, no-limit 2-7 lowball draw was added back to make the tournament a 9-game mix.

Michael Mizrachi became the first two-time champion after winning the event in 2010 and 2012, earning him $1,559,046 and $1,451,527 respectively. Brian Rast became the second two-time champion after winning the event in 2011 and 2016, earning him $1,720,328 and $1,296,097 respectively. Daniel Cates became the third two-time champion, and first person to win the event in consecutive years after winning the event in 2021 and 2022, earning him $954,020 and $1,449,103 respectively.

At the 2018 WSOP, Mizrachi won the event for a record third time, defeating 2014 champion John Hennigan heads up and winning $1,239,126.

At the 2023 World Series of Poker, Rast became the second three-time winner of the event and earned $1,324,747 for his efforts.

At the 2025 World Series of Poker, Mizrachi won his fourth Poker Players Championship title, setting the record for most wins for the third time and winning $1,331,322 in the process.

== Summary of events ==
Year	Event name	Mix	Entrants	Winner	Prize	Second	Third
2006	$50,000 H.O.R.S.E.	5-game	143	(United States) David "Chip" Reese	$1,716,000	(United States) Andy Bloch	(United States) Phil Ivey
2007	$50,000 World Championship H.O.R.S.E.	5-game	148	(Lebanon) Freddy Deeb	$2,276,832	(France) Bruno Fitoussi	(United States) John Hanson
2008	$50,000 World Championship H.O.R.S.E.	5-game	148	(Vietnam) Scotty Nguyen	$1,989,120	(United States) Michael DeMichele	(United States) Erick Lindgren
2009	$50,000 World Championship H.O.R.S.E.	5-game	95	(United States) David Bach	$1,276,802	(United States) John Hanson	(Sweden) Erik Sagström
2010	$50,000 The Poker Players Championship	8-game	116	(United States) Michael Mizrachi	$1,559,046	(Russia) Vladimir Shchemelev	(United States) David Oppenheim
2011	$50,000 The Poker Players Championship	8-game	128	(United States) Brian Rast	$1,720,328	(United States) Phil Hellmuth	(Vietnam) Minh Ly
2012	$50,000 The Poker Players Championship	8-game	108	(United States) Michael Mizrachi (2)	$1,451,527	(United States) Chris Klodnicki	(United States) Andy Bloch
2013	$50,000 The Poker Players Championship	8-game	132	(United Kingdom) Matthew Ashton	$1,774,089	(United States) Don Nguyen	(United States) John Hennigan
2014	$50,000 The Poker Players Championship	8-game	102	(United States) John Hennigan	$1,517,767	(United States) Brandon Shack-Harris	(United States) Jesse Martin
2015	$50,000 The Poker Players Championship	10-game	84	(Russia) Mike Gorodinsky	$1,270,086	(United States) Jean-Robert Bellande	(United States) David "ODB" Baker
2016	$50,000 The Poker Players Championship	8-game	91	(United States) Brian Rast (2)	$1,296,097	(United States) Justin Bonomo	(United States) Eric Wasserson
2017	$50,000 The Poker Players Championship	8-game	100	(United Kingdom) Elior Sion	$1,395,767	(Germany) Johannes Becker	(United States) Isaac Haxton
2018	$50,000 The Poker Players Championship	8-game	87	(United States) Michael Mizrachi (3)	$1,239,126	(United States) John Hennigan	(United States) Dan Smith
2019	$50,000 The Poker Players Championship	8-game	74	(United States) Phil Hui	$1,099,311	(United States) Josh Arieh	(United States) John Esposito
2020	not held						
2021	$50,000 The Poker Players Championship	9-game	63	(United States) Daniel Cates	$954,020	(United States) Ryan Leng	(United States) Paul Volpe
2022	$50,000 The Poker Players Championship	9-game	112	(United States) Daniel Cates (2)	$1,449,103	(Brazil) Yuri Dzivielevski	(Japan) Naoya Kihara
2023	$50,000 The Poker Players Championship	9-game	99	(United States) Brian Rast (3)	$1,324,747	(United Kingdom) Talal Shakerchi	(United Kingdom) Matthew Ashton
2024	$50,000 The Poker Players Championship	9-game	89	(Canada) Daniel Negreanu	$1,178,703	(United States) Bryce Yockey	(United States) Chris Brewer
2025	$50,000 The Poker Players Championship	9-game	107	(United States) Michael Mizrachi (4)	$1,331,322	(United States) Bryn Kenney	(United States) Esther Taylor
2026	$50,000 The Poker Players Championship	9-game	108	(United Kingdom) Benny Glaser	$1,343,764	(United States) Josh Arieh	(United States) Phil Ivey
