= Marco Johnson =

American poker player (born 1985)

- Nicknames: CrazyMarco, NoraFlum, & LayItDownSr
- Born: October 25, 1985 (age 41)

World Series of Poker
- Bracelets: 2
- Final tables: 14
- Money finishes: 43
- Highest WSOP Main Event finish: 35th, 2022

World Poker Tour
- Money finishes: 8

Marco Caldwell Johnson (born October 25, 1985) is a professional poker player who has won two World Series of Poker bracelets. Johnson also has excelled online in Limit H.O.R.S.E. earning both a World Championship of Online Poker championship among large prizes.

== Career highlights ==
Johnson won the 343-entrant $2,500 Limit Hold'em Six Handed 2013 World Series of Poker Event 48 at a shorthanded final table that included Juha Helppi and Maria Ho, earning a prize of $206,796. Although that was his only bracelet up to that point, it was not Johnson's largest prize. He had finished second to Alexandre Gomes at the 2,317-entrant $2,000 No-Limit Hold'em 2008 World Series of Poker Event 48 for a prize of $491,273. In fact, prior to his first bracelet, he had finished as runner up three times in World Series of Poker events — $2,500 Limit Hold'em Six Handed 2012 World Series of Poker Event 40 and $1,500 Pot Limit Omaha Hi-Low Split-8 or Better 2013 World Series of Poker Event 31. The 2013 bracelet was in the same $2,500 Limit Hold’em Six-Max event that he earned his 2012 runner-up finish in.

On September 15, 2012, Johnson won the $320 buy-in PokerStars 2012 World Championship of Online Poker Limit H.O.R.S.E. Event No. 41 against a field of 598 for a prize of $33,727.20. Johnson's biggest online win came on February 15, 2009, in the $150 + $13 buy-in Full Tilt Poker 200K Guarantee No-limit Hold'em with Rebuys when he defeated a field of 637 who had purchased 1142 rebuys and 547 addons for a prize of $85,481. His biggest online prize came from a 3rd-place finish in the $10,000 + $300 buy-in September 20, 2009, PokerStars World Championship of Online Poker Limit H.O.R.S.E. Event No. 44 that earned him $133,900.

Johnson's residence is in Mexico, where he plays high-stakes online poker. Johnson was inspired to play poker by poker professional and legend Chip Reese, who was a neighbor of his growing up.

== World Series of Poker ==
World Series of Poker results
| Year | Cashes | Final Tables | Bracelets |
|---|---|---|---|
| 2007 | 5 | 1 | 0 |
| 2008 | 3 | 1 | 0 |
| 2009 | 2 | 0 | 0 |
| 2010 | 3 | 1 | 0 |
| 2011 | 2 | 0 | 0 |
| 2012 | 2 | 1 | 0 |
| 2013 | 7 | 3 | 1 |
| 2014 | 3 | | |
| 2015 | 4 | 1 | 0 |
| 2016 | 5 | 2 | 1 |
| 2017 | 5 | 1 | 0 |
| 2018 | 2 | 2 | 0 |

World Series of Poker bracelets
| Year | Tournament | Prize (US$) |
|---|---|---|
| 2013 | $2,500 Six-handed Limit Texas hold 'em | $206,796 |
| 2016 | $3,000 H.O.R.S.E. | $259,730 |

World Championship of Online Poker bracelets
| Year | Tournament | Prize (US$) |
|---|---|---|
| 2012 | $320 Limit H.O.R.S.E. | $33,727.20 |
