= Tom Schneider =

American poker player (born 1959)

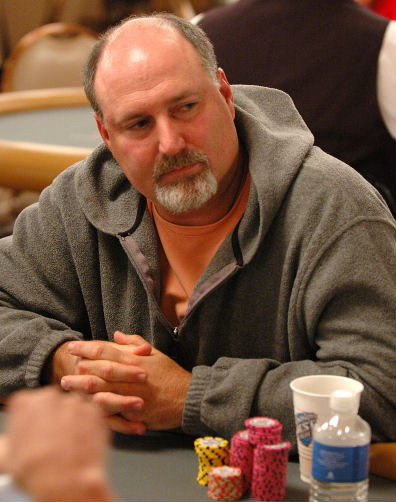
- Schneider at the 2006 World Series of Poker $1,500 Limit Hold'em Shootout
- Nickname: Donkey Bomber
- Born: December 24, 1959 (age 66); Indianapolis, Indiana, U.S.

World Series of Poker
- Bracelets: 4
- Final tables: 10
- Money finishes: 34
- Highest WSOP Main Event finish: 36th, 2002

World Poker Tour
- Title: None
- Final tables: 2
- Money finishes: 4

Tom Schneider (born December 24, 1959, in Indianapolis, Indiana) is a professional poker player from Phoenix, Arizona. Schneider is a certified public accountant and former president of a public golf company and chief financial officer for three Arizona companies before beginning his poker career in 2002.

== Poker career ==
At the 2007 World Series of Poker Schneider won his first two WSOP bracelets, one in Omaha Hi/Lo 8 or Better/Seven-Card Stud Hi/Lo and the second in Seven-Card Stud Hi/Lo. He made the final table of the $2,500 H.O.R.S.E. event, finishing in fourth place. These finishes earned him the 2007 WSOP Player of the Year award.

On September 16, 2008, Schneider won the event #24 of the World Championship of Online Poker, a $530 buy-in No-Limit 2-7 Single Draw tournament. Schneider, who uses the name 'luvgamble' on PokerStars, bested a field of 308 to win the $42,000 first prize.

Schneider won his third WSOP bracelet in the $1,500 H.O.R.S.E. event at the 2013 World Series of Poker, defeating Owais Ahmed heads-up to win $259,960. He won his fourth bracelet in the $5,000 H.O.R.S.E. event defeating Benjamin Scholl.

As of 2017, his total live tournament winnings exceed $2,400,000. His 46 cashes at the WSOP account for $1.6 million of those winnings.

Tom was the co-host of the popular poker podcast, Beyond The Table, along with Karridy Askenasy and Dan Michalski, creator and head blogger at Pokerati, where Tom was a contributing columnist.

=== Other appearances ===
On a side note, Schneider plays an uncredited role as a poker dealer on CSI episode 16 of season 13 "Last Lady Standing". He is shown briefly in a video as a dealer of the "1998 Palermo Poker Open" Final Table.

== Business and other interests ==
As of 2017, he is chief financial officer of Loudmouth Golf. He wears their sport coats on Poker Night in America TV shows. He was also the Controller for Ping Golf. He is the author of the book Oops! I Won Too Much Money: Winning Wisdom from the Boardroom to the Poker Table which provides lessons for both poker and business.

== Personal life ==
He is the father of two children and is married to Kathy, who has three children from a previous marriage. Schneider is a singer-songwriter of country songs.

== World Series of Poker Bracelets ==
| Year | Tournament | Prize (US$) |
|---|---|---|
| 2007 | $2,500 Omaha/Seven Card Stud Hi/Lo 8 or Better | $214,347 |
| 2007 | $1,000 Seven Card Stud Hi/Lo 8 or Better | $147,713 |
| 2013 | $1,500 H.O.R.S.E. | $258,960 |
| 2013 | $5,000 H.O.R.S.E. | $318,955 |
