= Bluff Europe =

Bluff Europe is a consumer poker magazine in the UK and Ireland, and a sister title to Bluff magazine. The print version of the magazine is distributed through card rooms, poker clubs and newsstands, while Bluff Europe is also the first ever magazine available by SMS subscription and the first poker magazine available in tablet form.

== Origins ==
"Bluff Europe" was founded by Michael Caselli, editor of online gambling trade publication iGaming Business and co-founder of Bluff Magazine USA. Caselli launched Bluff Europe in 2006, and continues to serve as editor-in-chief.

The magazine is published monthly, and includes interviews, features and poker strategy from a range of regular and one-off columnists from the poker world. Its 100th issue, published in May 2014, featured interviews with World Series of Poker champions Phil Hellmuth, Doyle Brunson and Jamie Gold.

== Columnists ==
A wide variety of poker players have contributed regular columns to Bluff Europe since its launch. Its longest-serving columnist is English poker player Neil Channing, while other regular contributors include Oscar-nominated actress and poker player Jennifer Tilly and World Series of Poker bracelet winner Phil Laak.

In an effort to continue its support of live poker in the UK, Bluff Europe has a partner cardroom at the Mint Casino in London.

== The British and Irish Poker Awards ==
Bluff Europe also organises the British Poker Awards and the Irish Poker Awards, two separate annual events created in order to honour the best poker players, leagues, clubs and tournaments in the UK and Ireland.

The British Poker Awards have been held at venues including the Hippodrome Casino in Leicester Square and the HMS President River Bar on the River Thames, while the Irish Poker Awards have taken place at the Regency Hotel Dublin. Previous award winners at the British Poker Awards include journalist and poker player Victoria Coren Mitchell and British all-time poker money list leader Sam Trickett. Bluff Europe has also founded Poker in the Park, the world's largest consumer poker event, which has been held in Leicester Square and Hanover Square in London.
