= Loni Hui =

American poker player

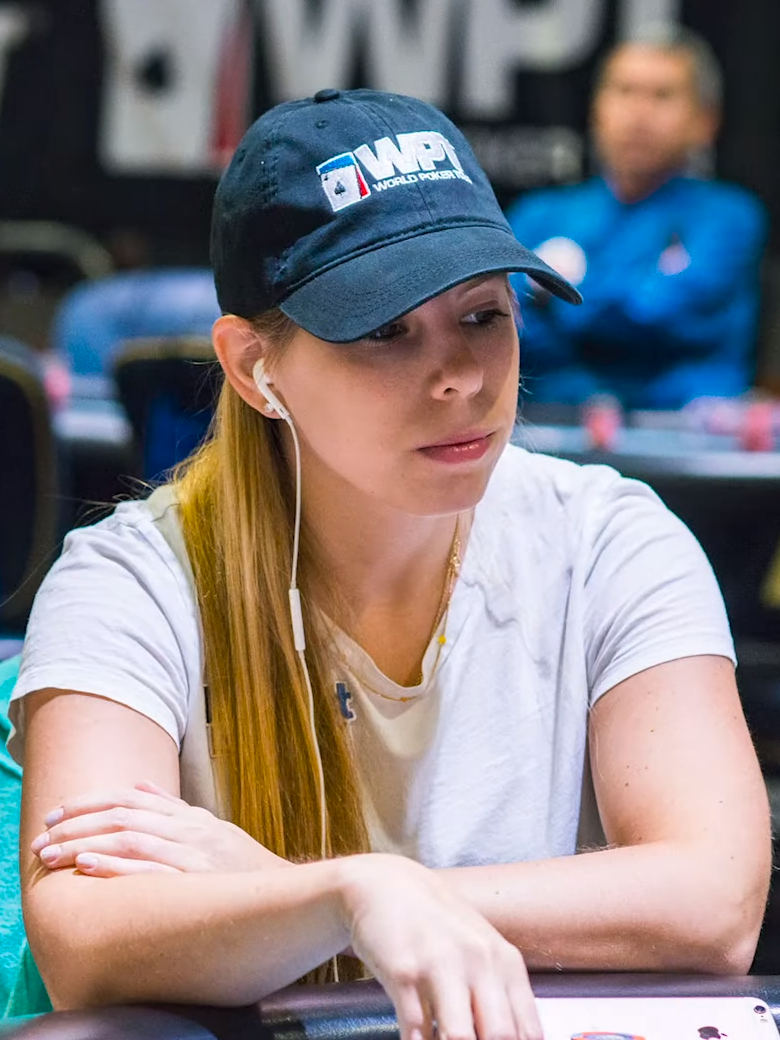
- Harwood in 2019

World Series of Poker
- Bracelets: 2
- Final tables: 5
- Money finishes: 35
- Highest WSOP Main Event finish: 721st, 2018

World Poker Tour
- Final table: 1
- Money finishes: 8

European Poker Tour
- Money finish: 1

Loni Hui (née Harwood; born c. 1989) is a professional poker player who won a World Series of Poker bracelet at the 2013 World Series of Poker. She won two World Series of Poker Circuit events in 2012, then her second WSOP bracelet in 2015.

== Background ==
Harwood earned a finance degree in 2012 from the University at Albany, State University of New York. Upon graduation, she moved to Florida and began playing poker, quickly discovering the World Series of Poker Circuit. Her initial poker training came from watching her father, Joel Harwood, play online.

== Career highlights ==
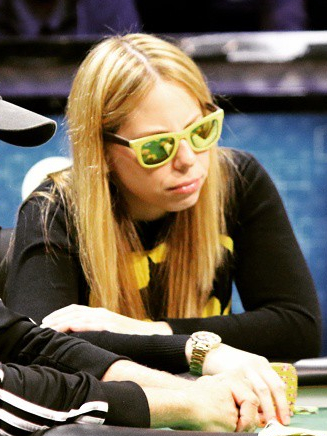
Harwood in 2015

Harwood won two World Series of Poker circuit rings in 2012: 2012 WSOP Circuit - Palm Beach Kennel Club 500-entrant $300 + $45 buy-in No-Limit Hold'em Event 2 for $30,994, and 2012 WSOP Circuit - Harrah's New Orleans 345-entrant $355 buy-in No-Limit Hold'em Event 4 for $23,090. The former was her first ever WSOP Circuit event. She earned her first bracelet by winning the 2,541-entrant $1,500 No Limit Hold'em 2013 World Series of Poker Event 60 and its $609,017 prize. Her victory at the 2013 World Series of Poker was historic: it made her the second woman (Cyndy Violette, 2005) to make three final tables in a single World Series and the first to win a bracelet in the same year she did so; it moved her into third place in the 2013 World Series of Poker Player of the Year race; and it moved her into eighth place on the all-time female World Series earnings list. Additionally, her $609,017 is the highest payout to a woman in any Las Vegas event in World Series of Poker history (second in overall World Series of Poker Europe history to Annette Obrestad's £1,000,000 from the 2007 World Series of Poker Europe main event) and her $874,698 total at the 2013 World Series of Poker is the highest female total in a single World Series.

On July 31, 2015, Harwood won the 2015 WSOP U.S. National Championship for $341,599 and her second career bracelet.

== World Series of Poker ==
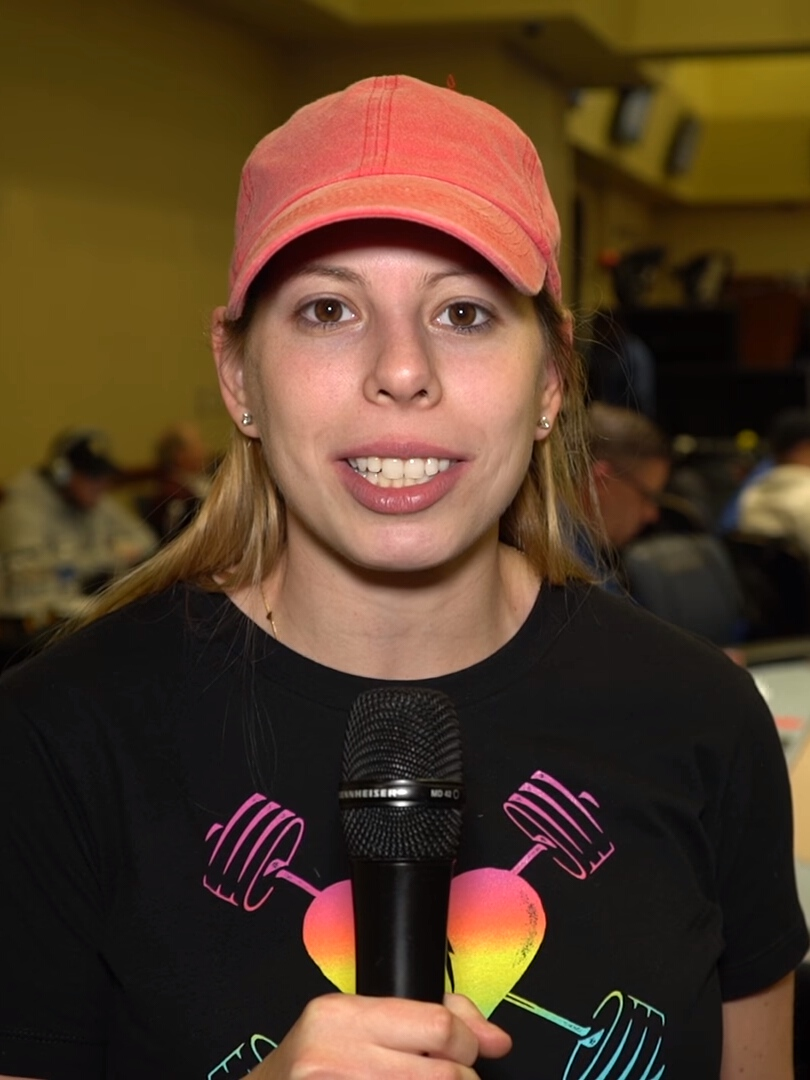
Harwood in 2018

World Series of Poker results
Year	Cashes	Final Tables	Bracelets
2013	6	3	1
2014	4		
2015	3	1	
2016	5	1	
2017	6		
2018	11	1	

World Series of Poker bracelets
Year	Tournament	Prize (US$)
2013	$1,500 No Limit Texas hold 'em	$609,017
2015	WSOP National Championship*	$341,599
