= 2013 World Series of Poker =

Series of poker tournaments

- Location: Rio All-Suite Hotel and Casino, Las Vegas, Nevada
- Dates: May 29 – July 15

Champion
- (United States) Ryan Riess

The 2013 World Series of Poker was the 44th annual World Series of Poker (WSOP). It was held at the Rio All Suite Hotel and Casino in Paradise, Nevada between May 29 – July 15, 2013. There was 62 bracelet events, culminating in the $10,000 No Limit Hold'em Main Event beginning on July 6. The November Nine concept returned for a sixth year, with the Main Event finalists returning on November 4.

The One Drop Foundation, a charity founded by Cirque du Soleil founder Guy Laliberté devoted to providing safe water supplies in developing countries, continued a relationship with the WSOP that began with the 2012 edition. While last year's $1 million Big One for One Drop was not held this year, the WSOP held two events that raised money for the charity. The first event was the One Drop High Roller, with a buy-in of $111,111; the Rio donated its 3% rake of the entry fees to One Drop. The other was the "Little One for One Drop", with a $1,111 buy-in plus unlimited rebuys, with One Drop receiving $111 from each buy-in and rebuy.

In April 2013, the WSOP expanded and held bracelet events in Australia at the 2013 World Series of Poker Asia-Pacific.

== Event schedule ==
#	Event	Entrants	Winner	Prize	Runner-up	Results	Reference
1	$500 Casino Employees No Limit Hold'em	898	Chad Holloway (1/1)	$84,915	Allan Kwong	Results	
2	$5,000 No Limit Hold'em Eight Handed	481	Trevor Pope (1/1)	$553,906	David Vamplew	Results	
3	$1,000 No Limit Hold'em Re-entry	3,164	Charles Sylvestre (1/1)	$491,360	Seth Berger	Results	
4	$1,500 No Limit Hold'em Six Handed	1,069	John Beauprez (1/1)	$324,764	Manig Löser	Results	
5	$2,500 Omaha/Seven Card Stud Hi-Low 8-or Better	374	Mike Gorodinsky (1/1)	$216,988	Kristopher Tong	Results	
6	$1,500 Millionaire Maker No Limit Hold'em	6,343	Benny Chen (1/1)	$1,199,104	Michael Bennington	Results	
7	$1,000 No Limit Hold'em	1,837	Matt Waxman (1/1)	$305,952	Eric Baldwin (0/1)	Results	
8	$2,500 Eight-Game Mix	388	Michael Malm (1/1)	$225,104	Steven Wolansky	Results	
9	$3,000 No Limit Hold'em Shootout	477	Cliff Josephy (1/2)	$299,486	Evan Silverstein	Results	
10	$1,500 Limit Hold'em	645	Brent Wheeler (1/1)	$191,605	Mark Mierkalns	Results	
11	$2,500 No Limit Hold'em Six Handed	924	Levi Berger (1/1)	$473,019	Scott Clements (0/2)	Results	
12	$1,500 Pot Limit Hold'em	535	Lev Rofman (1/1)	$166,136	Allen Cunningham (0/5)	Results	
13	$5,000 Seven Card Stud Hi-Low Split-8 or Better	210	Mike Matusow (1/4)	$266,503	Matthew Ashton	Results	
14	$1,500 No Limit Hold'em	1,819	Jonathan Taylor (1/1)	$454,424	Blake Bohn	Results	
15	$1,500 H.O.R.S.E.	862	Tom Schneider (1/3)	$258,960	Owais Ahmed (0/1)	Results	
16	$10,000 Heads Up No Limit Hold'em	162	Mark Radoja (1/2)	$331,190	Don Nguyen	Results	
17	$1,500 No Limit Hold'em	2,105	Athanasios Polychronopoulos (1/2)	$518,755	Manuel Mutke	Results	
18	$1,000 No Limit Hold'em	2,071	Taylor Paur (1/1)	$340,260	Roy Weiss	Results	
19	$5,000 Pot Limit Hold'em	195	Davidi Kitai (1/2)	$224,560	Cary Katz	Results	
20	$1,500 Omaha Hi-Low Split-8 or Better	1,014	Calen McNeil (1/1)	$277,274	Can Kim Hua	Results	
21	$3,000 No Limit Hold'em Six Handed	807	Martin Finger (1/1)	$506,764	Matt Stout	Results	
22	$1,500 Pot Limit Omaha	1,022	Josh Pollock (1/1)	$279,431	Noah Schwartz	Results	
23	$2,500 Seven Card Stud	246	David Chiu (1/5)	$145,520	Scott Seiver (0/1)	Results	
24	$1,500 No Limit Hold'em	1,731	Corey Harrison (1/1)	$432,411	Daniel Cascado	Results	
25	$5,000 Omaha Hi-Low Split-8 or Better	241	Danny Fuhs (1/1)	$277,519	Christopher George	Results	
26	$1,000 Seniors No Limit Hold'em Championship	4,407	Kenneth Lind (1/1)	$634,809	Dana Ott	Results	
27	$3,000 Mixed Max No Limit Hold'em	593	Isaac Hagerling (1/1)	$372,387	Max Steinberg (0/1)	Results	
28	$1,500 No Limit Hold'em	2,115	Jason Duval (1/1)	$521,202	Majid Yahyaei	Results	
29	$5,000 H.O.R.S.E.	261	Tom Schneider (2/4)	$318,955	Benjamin Scholl (0/1)	Results	
30	$1,000 No Limit Hold'em	2,108	Chris Dombrowski (1/1)	$346,332	Mathew Moore	Results	
31	$1,500 Pot Limit Omaha Hi-Low Split-8 or Better	936	Jarred Graham (1/1)	$255,942	Marco Johnson	Results	
32	$5,000 No Limit Hold'em Six Handed	516	Erick Lindgren (1/2)	$606,317	Lee Markholt	Results	
33	$2,500 Seven Card Razz	301	Bryan Campanello (1/1)	$178,052	David Bach (0/1)	Results	
34	$1,000 Turbo No Limit Hold'em	1,629	Michael Gathy (1/2)	$278,613	Benjamin Reason	Results	
35	$3,000 Pot Limit Omaha	640	Jeff Madsen (1/3)	$384,420	Douglas Corning	Results	
36	$1,500 No Limit Hold'em Shootout	1,194	Simeon Naydenov (1/1)	$326,440	Jake Schwartz	Results	
37	$5,000 Limit Hold'em	170	Michael Moore (1/1)	$211,743	Gabriel Nassif	Results	
38	$2,500 No Limit Hold'em Four Handed	566	Justin Oliver (1/1)	$309,071	Nick Schwarmann	Results	
39	$1,500 Seven Card Stud Hi-Low Split-8 or Better	558	Daniel Idema (1/2)	$184,590	Joseph Hertzog	Results	
40	$1,500 No Limit Hold'em	2,161	Jared Hamby (1/1)	$525,272	Peter Hengsakul	Results	
41	$5,000 Pot Limit Omaha Six Handed	400	Steve Gross (1/1)	$488,817	Salman Behbehani	Results	
42	$1,000 No Limit Hold'em	2,100	Norbert Szecsi (1/1)	$345,037	Denis Gnidash	Results	
43	$10,000 2-7 Draw Lowball	87	Jesse Martin (1/1)	$253,524	David Baker (0/2)	Results	
44	$3,000 No Limit Hold'em	1,072	Sandeep Pulusani (1/1)	$592,684	Niall Farrell	Results	
45	$1,500 Ante Only No Limit Hold'em	678	Ben Volpe (1/1)	$201,399	Paul Lieu	Results	
46	$3,000 Pot Limit Omaha Hi-Low Split-8 or Better	435	Vladimir Shchemelev (1/1)	$279,094	Mel Judah (0/2)	Results	
47	$111,111 One Drop High Rollers No Limit Hold'em	166	Anthony Gregg (1/1)	$4,830,619	Chris Klodnicki	Results	
48	$2,500 Limit Hold'em Six Handed	343	Marco Johnson (1/1)	$206,796	Jeff Thompson	Results	
49	$1,500 No Limit Hold'em	2,247	Barny Boatman (1/1)	$546,080	Brian O'Donoghue	Results	
50	$2,500 10-Game Mix Six Handed	372	Brandon Wong (1/1)	$220,061	Sebastian Saffari	Results	
51	$10,000 Ladies No Limit Hold'em Championship	954	Kristen Bicknell (1/1)	$173,922	Leanne Haas	Results	
52	$25,000 No Limit Hold'em Six Handed	175	Steve Sung (1/2)	$1,205,324	Phil Galfond (0/1)	Results	
53	$1,500 No Limit Hold'em	2,816	Brett Shaffer (1/1)	$665,397	David Vamplew	Results	
54	$1,000 No Limit Hold'em	2,883	Dana Castaneda (1/1)	$454,207	Jason Bigelow	Results	
55	$50,000 Poker Players Championship	132	Matthew Ashton (1/1)	$1,774,089	Don Nguyen	Results	
56	$2,500 No Limit Hold'em	1,736	Nikolaus Teichert (1/1)	$730,756	Vincent Maglio	Results	
57	$5,000 No Limit Hold'em	784	Matt Perrins (1/2)	$792,275	Arthur Pro	Results	
58	$1,111 The Little One for One Drop No Limit Hold'em	4,756	Brian Yoon (1/1)	$663,727	Cuong Van Nguyen	Results	
59	$2,500 2-7 Triple Draw Lowball	282	Eli Elezra (1/2)	$173,236	Daniel Negreanu (1/5)	Results	
60	$1,500 No Limit Hold'em	2,541	Loni Harwood (1/1)	$609,017	Yongshuo Zheng	Results	
61	$10,000 Pot Limit Omaha	386	Daniel Alaei (1/4)	$852,692	Jared Bleznick	Results	
62	$10,000 No Limit Hold'em Main Event	6,352	Ryan Riess (1/1)	$8,361,570	Jay Farber	Results	

== Main Event ==
The $10,000 No Limit Hold'em Main Event began on July 6 with the first of three starting days. Remaining players from days 1A and 1B returned on Day 2AB, while the players from Day 1C returned on Day 2C with the entire field combining on Day 3. The final table of nine players was reached on July 15, with the November Nine returning on November 4.

The Main Event attracted 6,352 entrants, creating a prize pool of $59,708,800. The top 648 finishers placed in the money, with the top nine players receiving at least $733,224. The winner of the Main Event earned $8,359,531.

=== Performance of past champions ===
Name	Championship Year(s)	Day of Elimination
Doyle Brunson	1976, 1977	4 (409th)*
Tom McEvoy	1983	3
Berry Johnston	1986	2C
Johnny Chan	1987, 1988	3
Phil Hellmuth	1989	3
Dan Harrington	1995	3
Huck Seed	1996	1C
Scotty Nguyen	1998	1B
Carlos Mortensen	2001	7 (10th)*
Robert Varkonyi	2002	1C
Chris Moneymaker	2003	2B
Greg Raymer	2004	1B
Joe Hachem	2005	2C
Jamie Gold	2006	2C
Jerry Yang	2007	2C
Joe Cada	2009	2A
Jonathan Duhamel	2010	1C
Pius Heinz	2011	1A
Greg Merson	2012	5 (167th)*

* Indicates the place of a player who finished in the money

=== Other notable high finishes ===
NB: This list is restricted to top 100 finishers with an existing Wikipedia entry.

Place	Name	Prize
10th	Carlos Mortensen	$573,204
12th	Rep Porter	$573,204
22nd	Yevgeniy Timoshenko	$285,408
52nd	Noah Schwartz	$151,063
89th	Annette Obrestad	$71,053
99th	Marvin Rettenmaier	$59,708

=== November Nine ===
Name	Number of chips (percentage of total)	WSOP Bracelets	WSOP Cashes*	WSOP Earnings*
(United States) J. C. Tran	38,000,000 (19.9%)	2	40	$1,843,946
(Israel) Amir Lehavot	29,700,000 (15.6%)	1	12	$818,414
(Canada) Marc-Etienne McLaughlin	26,525,000 (13.9%)	0	6	$639,168
(United States) Jay Farber	25,975,000 (13.6%)	0	0	0
(United States) Ryan Riess	25,875,000 (13.6%)	0	3	$30,569
(France) Sylvain Loosli	19,600,000 (10.3%)	0	0	0
(Netherlands) Michiel Brummelhuis	11,275,000 (5.9%)	0	7	$174,170
(United States) Mark Newhouse	7,350,000 (3.9%)	0	6	$152,725
(United States) David Benefield	6,375,000 (3.3%)	0	12	$455,713

*Career statistics prior to the beginning of the 2013 Main Event.

=== Final Table ===
Place	Name	Prize
1st	Ryan Riess	$8,361,570
2nd	Jay Farber	$5,174,357
3rd	Amir Lehavot	$3,727,823
4th	Sylvain Loosli	$2,792,533
5th	J. C. Tran	$2,106,893
6th	Marc-Etienne McLaughlin	$1,601,024
7th	Michiel Brummelhuis	$1,225,356
8th	David Benefield	$944,650
9th	Mark Newhouse	$733,224
