= IGaming Business =

UK magazine

iGaming Business
- Editor-in-Chief: Michael Caselli
- Categories: B2B Magazine
- Frequency: Bimonthly
- Total circulation: 10,000 (2013)
- Founded: 2003
- Company: Clarion Events
- Country: United Kingdom
- Based in: London
- Language: English
- Website: igamingbusiness.com

iGaming Business, sometimes stylized as iGB, is a business-to-business (B2B) magazine focusing on the online gambling industry. It launched in 2003, and has two sister magazines - iGaming Business North America and iGB Affiliate.

The magazine is a bi-monthly publication covering industry news, regulatory developments, and interviews with senior figures from the online poker, casino, bingo and sports betting space. It has featured interviews with CEOs of FTSE 100 and FTSE 250 companies.

A website, igamingbusiness.com, publishes daily news from public and private companies in the sector. Michael Caselli has served as editor-in-chief of the three magazines for their duration, and is the co-founder of each of the magazines as they exist in their current format. Caselli leads the direction of each magazine and their accompanying conferences.

In 2023, the magazine partnered with German gambling news site Glücksspielwesen.de, owned by Behörden Spiegel, to "spark discussions about Germany’s gambling regulations," and to expand their shared reach in the online gambling industry.

== iGaming Business North America ==
iGaming Business North America was launched in May 2012 and covers regulatory progress in the United States. It has featured interviews with executives and politicians in states such as Nevada, Delaware and New Jersey as the three states have become the first to regulate intrastate online gambling in the USA.

Its first issue featured an interview with Gavin Isaacs, then CEO of Shuffle Master. Other interviewees have included United States Congressman Joe Barton and New Jersey State Senator Raymond Lesniak.

== iGB Affiliate ==
iGB Affiliate launched in 2006 and focuses specifically on the iGaming affiliate market. It is a bi-monthly publication, in print and online format, and is distributed among the online gambling affiliate community along with an annual affiliate directory - a comprehensive database of iGaming suppliers.

The magazine also produces annual conferences for the affiliate community in London, Amsterdam, Canada and Barcelona, with the first London Affiliate Conference held in 2007. These are free-to-attend for gambling affiliates and are frequently held alongside trade shows such as the International Casino Exhibition (ICE) and the iGaming Super Show.
