= Bruno Vanryb =

French entrepreneur (1957–2019)

Bruno Vanryb was the CEO of BVRP, a Paris-based company he co-founded with Roger Politis in 1984. He was a French entrepreneur (1957 - 12 January 2019). Additionally, he was the founder and former CEO of Avanquest, a worldwide software company. He headed Be Brave, a consultancy firm.

== Biography ==
Vanryb was a former sound engineer and tech journalist (SVM, Micro Systèmes and Soft & Micro particular), and author of twelve books on micro-computers.

In 1984, he cofounded BVRP with Roger Politis, which became Avanquest, a leading software publisher in France and around the world. In January 2014, the company had 530 employees across seven countries. One of the flagship products of the company was a fax software named WinFax. Vanryb served as CEO and then Executive Chairman of Avanquest until June 2015.

He was also very active in the French digital and innovation ecosystem. Vanryb, along with Denis Payre, participated in the foundation of an association called Croissance Plus, which supports and raises awareness of growing companies in France. He chaired the association between 1998 and 2000. From 2002 to 2005, Vanryb served as President of Middlenext, an association whose members are medium-sized companies listed on Euronext, Paris stock exchange. In July 2007, Bruno Vanryb was appointed to the Board of Directors of Euronext Paris until 2014. From 2010 to 2015, he also served as vice-president of Syntec Numérique, which represents 1,100 member companies and groups, with 50% being software companies. Between April 2011 and July 2012, he was a member and vice-president of the Conseil national du numérique, a consultative group created by French president Nicolas Sarkozy to advise him on digital issues.

From 2016, Vanryb was a Senior Partner at the M&A boutique Avolta Partners.

Bruno Vanryb died in a motorcycle accident on 12 January 2019.
