= BVRP =

Paris-based software company

BVRP Software SA is a Paris-based software company that has purchased American software companies.

A 2007 acquisition placed it, according to one report, as then being the sixth largest publisher of consumer software in the United States.

== History ==
BVRP was started in 1984 by "Bruno Vanryb and Roger Politis, sound engineers." The company's first offering was a modem-based business phone number service, "a database program called Directory."

When their Paris-based company partnered with Hayes Microcomputer Products they increased their range beyond Paris and France "to 62 other countries."

Vanryb claimed that French venture capital companies "prefer to invest in bigger companies, they don't like startups" so he turned to U.S. sources, leading to AvanQuest and VCOM.

== Avanquest ==
Avanquest is a marketing name for PC software such as Avanquest Fix-It Utilities 11 Professional, a collection of optimization tools. In mid 2003 parent company BVRP expanded the Avanquest identity to be Avanquest Global Software Publishing, which it then used to market in Japan and Spain. With Avanquest's 2007 acquisition of Nova Development Corp., "a publisher focusing on the consumer market," BVRP's portfolio reportedly became the fifth or sixth largest publisher of consumer software in the United States.

In 2019, Avanquest had 83 million euro in revenue[footnote] from three main segments:

- IT security: antivirus, ad blocker, cleaning and optimization tools sold under the Adaware brand
- PDF: PDF management products grouped under the SodaPDF brand
- Photo: photo editing software and apps developed under the InPixio brand

== VCOM (V Communications) ==
Memory Commander is an early DOS memory manager made by V Communications similar to the likes of QEMM, Helix Netroom or 386MAX, though much more capable. It allowed up to 904KB of conventional memory by utilizing the memory virtualization features of i386 to remap the Upper memory area into the High memory area in addition to automatically managing drivers and TSRs.

System Commander was introduced in 1993 by V Communications, sometimes referred to as VCOM.

System Commander included Partition Commander. With the 2005 purchase by BVRP of this company, they were able to compete with PowerQuest (PQ) and its PartitionMagic. PQ's bundle of software included PQboot, competing with System Commander.

Although PowerQuest was acquired by Symantec, which retired this software in 2009, rather than update it to run under Windows Vista, System Commander and Partition Commander have a market: competitor Paragon Software Group released a major new upgrade in 2015.
