= Vladimir Shchemelev =

Russian banker and poker player

- Nickname: GVOZDIKA55

World Series of Poker
- Bracelets: 2
- Final tables: 10
- Money finishes: 31
- Highest WSOP Main Event finish: 114th, 2014

European Poker Tour
- Money finishes: 2

Vladimir Shchemelev (born 1972 or 1973) is a Russian banker and professional poker player from St. Petersburg, Russia. He is an online cash game player earning over $1,600,000 playing under the alias GVOZDIKA55 on PokerStars and NEKOTYAN on Full Tilt Poker. He specializes in mixed games.

== Poker career ==
Shchemelev made two cashes in the 2007 WSOP. In 2010, he was a relatively unknown player who had success in The Poker Player's Championship finishing runner-up to Michael Mizrachi for $963,375. He went on to cash an additional three times that year.

In 2013, he won his first bracelet in the $3,000 Pot Limit Omaha Hi/Lo event for $279,094.

As of 2019, Shchemelev's total live tournament winnings exceed $2,200,000.

=== World Series of Poker ===
World Series of Poker bracelets
Year	Event	Prize money
2013	$3,000 Pot Limit Omaha Hi/Lo event	$279,094
2017	$1,500 Omaha Hi-Lo 8 or Better Mix	$193,484
