= J. C. Tran =

Vietnamese-American poker player (born 1977)

J.C. Tran
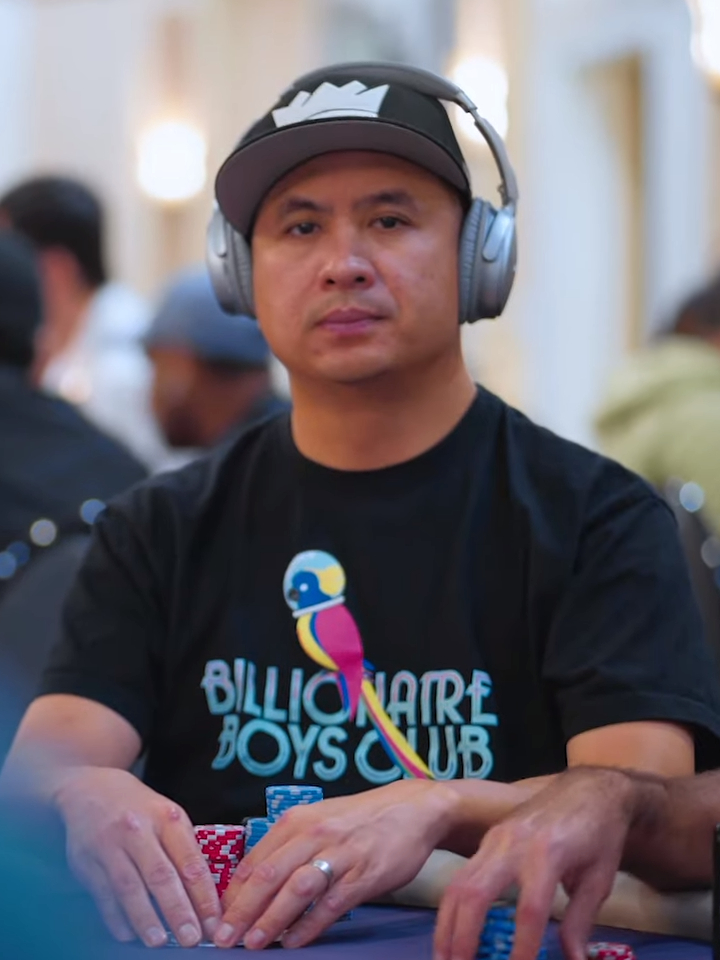
- Tran at the 2019 World Poker Tour Legends of Poker
- Nickname: "J.C."
- Born: Justin Cuong Van Tran; January 20, 1977 (age 49); Socialist Republic of Vietnam

World Series of Poker
- Bracelets: 2
- Final tables: 11
- Money finishes: 46
- Highest WSOP Main Event finish: 5th, 2013

World Poker Tour
- Titles: 2
- Final tables: 8
- Money finishes: 20

J. C. Tran (born Justin Cuong Van Tran January 20, 1977) is a Vietnamese-American professional poker player, based in Sacramento, California.

Tran is a two-time World Series of Poker bracelet winner, a World Championship of Online Poker (WCOOP) Main Event champion, has made eight World Poker Tour (WPT) final tables, winner of a WPT title, won at the World Poker Challenge and is the WPT Player of the Year of their fifth season. Tran was the chip leader coming into the final table of the 2013 WSOP Main Event November Nine. He ended up finishing in 5th place for $2,106,893 for the biggest cash of his career.

== Early life ==
Tran was born in Vietnam, and is the youngest of eight children of Vietnamese parents. When he was two years old, his family moved to the United States, where he later received a degree in Business Management Information Systems from California State University at Sacramento.

Tran built his bankroll playing the $9/$18 game at Capitol Casino in Sacramento, California. Tran has since noted that it had become too much of an action game to eke out a positive gain.

== Poker career ==
Tran has finished in the money at numerous poker tournaments, finishing 5th at the 2004 World Poker Finals in Mashantucket and on the television bubble of the 2004 L.A. Poker Classic and 2005 Borgata Poker Open. He finished 5th in the 2006 L.A. Poker Classic. All of these events were televised on the World Poker Tour (WPT).

Tran has cashed in the $10,000 no limit hold'em WSOP main event in both 2004 and 2005, finishing 117th both years. Tran also finished 2nd in a World Series of Poker circuit event, winning $251,920.

On October 2, 2006, Tran won the main event at PokerStars' WCOOP, winning $670,000.

In February 2007, Tran finished 2nd in the 2007 L.A. Poker Classic, winning $1,177,010. On March 25 he won his first WPT title, the World Poker Challenge, earning $683,473. He was also the World Poker Tour's Player of the Year.

Notable victories include:

- 2003 Heavenly Hold'em, $300 limit hold'em: $74,150
- 2005 Rio Las Vegas Poker Festival, $1,500 no limit hold'em: $97,470
- 2007 Doyle Brunson Five Diamond World Poker Classic: $523,075

On June 28, 2008, Tran won his first bracelet at the 2008 World Series of Poker in Event 49, $1,500 No Limit event besting a field of 2,718. Tran took home $631,170 in winnings. In all, Tran cashed in 7 events at the 2008 WSOP, good for $896,392 in total winnings and a 6th-place finish in the 2008 WSOP Player of the Year.

In November 2008, Tran won The PartyPoker.com Premier League III by beating Tony G in heads-up play. Tran took home $300,000 for winning first place at the final table.

In June 2009, during the 40th Annual World Series of Poker, Tran won his second bracelet for winning the $2,500 Pot-limit Omaha event.

He has made the November 9 final table of the 2013 WSOP main event, where he started as chip leader but finished in 5th place, earning $2,106,893.

Tran used all his poker knowledge and experience to overcome a short stack and with the support of his friends and family, he won the latest WPT event held at the Thunder Valley Casino Resort on Mar 15–19, 2014.

As a result of his second WPT title, he became only the 20th player in history to won multiple WPT events.

As of June 2026, he has over $13.6 million in live tournament winnings.

World Series of Poker results
Year	Cashes	Final Tables	Bracelets
2004	3	2	
2005	4	1	
2006	6	1	
2007	4		
2008	7	3	1
2009	4	1	1
2010	2		
2011	3		
2012	2		
2013	5	1	
2014	3	2	

== Awards ==
ALL IN Magazine 2007 Poker Player of the Year

=== World Series of Poker Bracelets ===
Year	Tournament	Prize (US$)
2008	$1,500 No Limit Hold'em	$631,170
2009	$2,500 Pot Limit Omaha	$235,685
