= David Benefield =

American poker player (born 1986)

- Nickname: Raptor
- Born: May 17, 1986 (age 40)

World Series of Poker
- Bracelet: None
- Final tables: 3
- Money finishes: 14
- Highest WSOP Main Event finish: 8th, 2013

World Poker Tour
- Money finish: 1

European Poker Tour
- Title: None
- Final tables: 3
- Money finishes: 4

David Benefield (born May 17, 1986) is an American professional poker player considered a high-stakes online cash game specialist who has earnings of over $900,000 from online winnings playing under his name on Full Tilt Poker. He made the World Series of Poker Main Event final table in 2013 finishing 8th.

== Poker career ==
Benefield picked up the name “Raptor” when he first ran $450 into $20,000. By the age of 20, he shared a half-million-dollar house in Fort Worth with fellow online high-stakes cash game specialist Tom Dwan.

As of 2014, Benefield's total live tournament winnings exceed $2,200,000 of which $1,430,630 of his total winnings have come from cashes at the WSOP.
