= David Chiu (poker player) =

Chinese-American poker player (born 1960)

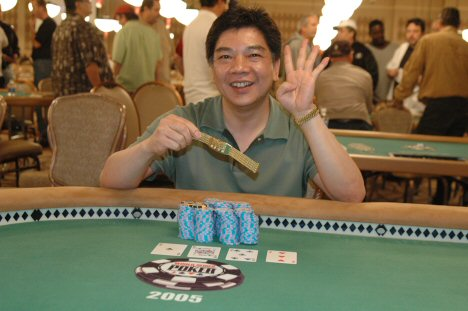
- Chiu winning an event at the 2005 World Series of Poker
- Born: Qiū Fāngquán; August 23, 1960 (age 66); Nanning, China

World Series of Poker
- Bracelets: 5
- Money finishes: 60
- Highest WSOP Main Event finish: 10th, 1996

World Poker Tour
- Title: 1
- Final tables: 2
- Money finishes: 9

David Chiu (Chinese: 邱芳全; pinyin: Qiū Fāngquán; born August 23, 1960, in Davenport, Iowa) is a Chinese American professional poker player, based in Las Vegas, Nevada, who has won five World Series of Poker bracelets. He is also the winner of the 2008 World Poker Tour's WPT World Championship, and the first winner of the Tournament of Champions of Poker.

Chiu was a restaurant owner in Colorado. He took a second job as a poker dealer and later became a poker tournament specialist who earned a reputation for himself by winning the $2,000 limit hold'em event at the 1996 World Series of Poker (WSOP).

Chiu also cashed in the WSOP $10,000 No Limit Texas Hold 'em main event in 1996 (10th), 2003 (55th), and 2006 (147th.)

== Personal life ==
Due to a swimming accident, Chiu is partially deaf in both ears. However, Chiu says that this has allowed him to concentrate more on reading his opponents at the table.

== Poker career ==
Chiu regularly plays World Poker Tour (WPT) events and has made two WPT final tables. At the Season 1 WPT Invitational event in 2003, he finished 3rd behind Layne Flack and Jerry Buss. In April 2008, Chiu won the Season 6 WPT Championship, overcoming Gus Hansen's more than 6:1 chip lead at the beginning of heads-up play to claim the title and the $3,389,140 prize.

Chiu has won five World Series of Poker bracelets.

As of 2016, his total live tournament winnings exceed $8,030,000. His 60 cashes as the WSOP account for $3,371,037 of those winnings.

== World Series of Poker Bracelets ==
Year	Tournament	Prize (US$)
1996	$2,000 Limit Hold'em	$396,000
1998	$3,000 Limit Hold'em	$205,200
2000	$5,000 Seven Card Stud	$202,000
2005	$5,000 Omaha Hi/Lo	$347,410
2013	$2,500 Seven Card Stud	$145,520
