= Owais Ahmed =

Pakistani poker player (born 1983)

- Born: August 18, 1983 (age 43); Miami, Florida, U.S.

World Series of Poker
- Bracelet: 1
- Final tables: 7
- Money finishes: 29

World Poker Tour
- Final table: 1
- Money finish: 1

Owais Ahmed (Urdu: اویس احمد ) (born August 18, 1983) was born in Miami, Florida and is a Pakistani professional poker player from Anaheim, California. He won his first World Series of Poker bracelet at the 2011 World Series of Poker where he finished in the money in five mixed game events. He also has won over $1,800,000 million in live poker tournament earnings. He has since pursued his interests into filmmaking and arts, along with starting to make short films. He is an Executive Producer on the movie "Joyland", which played at the Cannes Film Festival in 2022.

== World Series of Poker ==
World Series of Poker results
Year	Cashes	Final Tables	Bracelets
2010	2	1	
2011	5	2	1
2012	2		
2013	3	2	
2014	3		
2015	2	1	
2016	2		
2017	6		
2018	4	1	

World Series of Poker bracelets
Year	Tournament	Prize (US$)
2011	$2,500 Omaha hold 'em/Seven Card Stud Hi/Lo	$255,959

Ahmed made the final table of his first WSOP in the money finish with a 5th-place finish in the 2010 408-player $1,500 Seven Card Stud Event 21 for a prize of $29,809. Prior to winning his first bracelet the following year, this was his highest prize. In 2011, he notched a 1st-place finish to earn his first bracelet at a final table that included five-time bracelet winner Scotty Nguyen and a heads up match against Michael Mizrachi at the 450-player $2,500 Omaha/Seven Card Stud Hi-Low-8 or Better Event 47 for a prize of $255,959. He overcame a three-to-one chip deficit against Mizrachi at the start of heads up play.

== Personal life ==
Ahmed was born in Miami, Florida and lives in Long Beach, California and is currently pursuing his interests in filmmaking and arts.
