= Ryan Riess =

American poker player (born 1990)

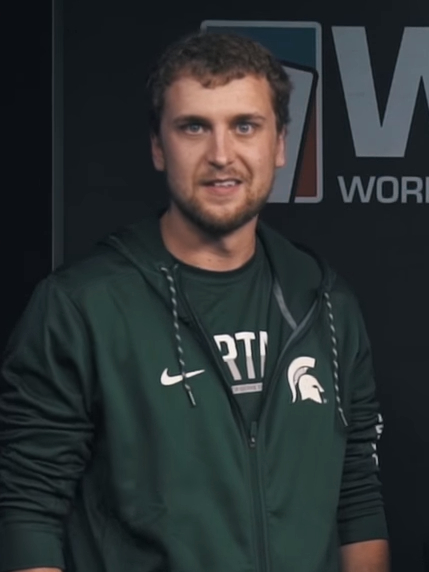
- Riess in 2017
- Nickname: Riess the Beast
- Born: June 21, 1990 (age 36)

World Series of Poker
- Bracelet: 1
- Final tables: 6
- Money finishes: 63
- Highest WSOP Main Event finish: Winner, 2013

World Poker Tour
- Title: 1
- Final table: 1
- Money finishes: 10

Ryan Riess (born June 21, 1990) is an American professional poker player best known for winning the 2013 World Series of Poker Main Event.

== Education ==
Riess attended Waterford Our Lady of the Lakes High School and graduated from Michigan State University with a Hospitality Business degree.

== Personal life ==
Ryan Riess lives in Las Vegas. He has a girlfriend and declared in an interview that he is expecting to have a child around March 2019.

== Poker career ==
His first career tournament cash came in October 2012, when he took 2nd place at the World Series of Poker Circuit main event in Hammond, Indiana, for $239,063. In the following few months, he had several cashes in smaller events throughout the United States. Riess first played the WSOP in 2013, cashing in 3 preliminary events with a best finish of 11th in a $1,000 No Limit Hold'em event. Playing in his first WSOP Main Event, he made the November Nine in 5th chip position with 25,875,000. After eliminating 4 players at the final table, Riess entered heads-up against Jay Farber with a nearly 20 million chip deficit. After 90 hands of heads-up play, Riess's A♥ K♥ defeated Farber's Q♠ 5♠ to win the championship bracelet and $8,361,570.

In April 2017 Riess won his first World Poker Tour title at the Seminole Hard Rock Poker Finale, earning $716,000. After a lengthy heads-up battle, Riess's A♥ K♥ defeated Alan Sternberg's 7♠ 7♦ to win the title, marking the second time Riess has won a major tournament with A♥ K♥.

As of May 2020, Riess's total live tournament winnings exceed $14,990,000 of which $9,970,113 have come from cashes at the WSOP.

World Series of Poker bracelets
Year	Tournament	Prize (US$)
2013	$10,000 No Limit Hold'em Main Event	$8,361,570
