= Michael Mizrachi =

American poker player (born 1981)

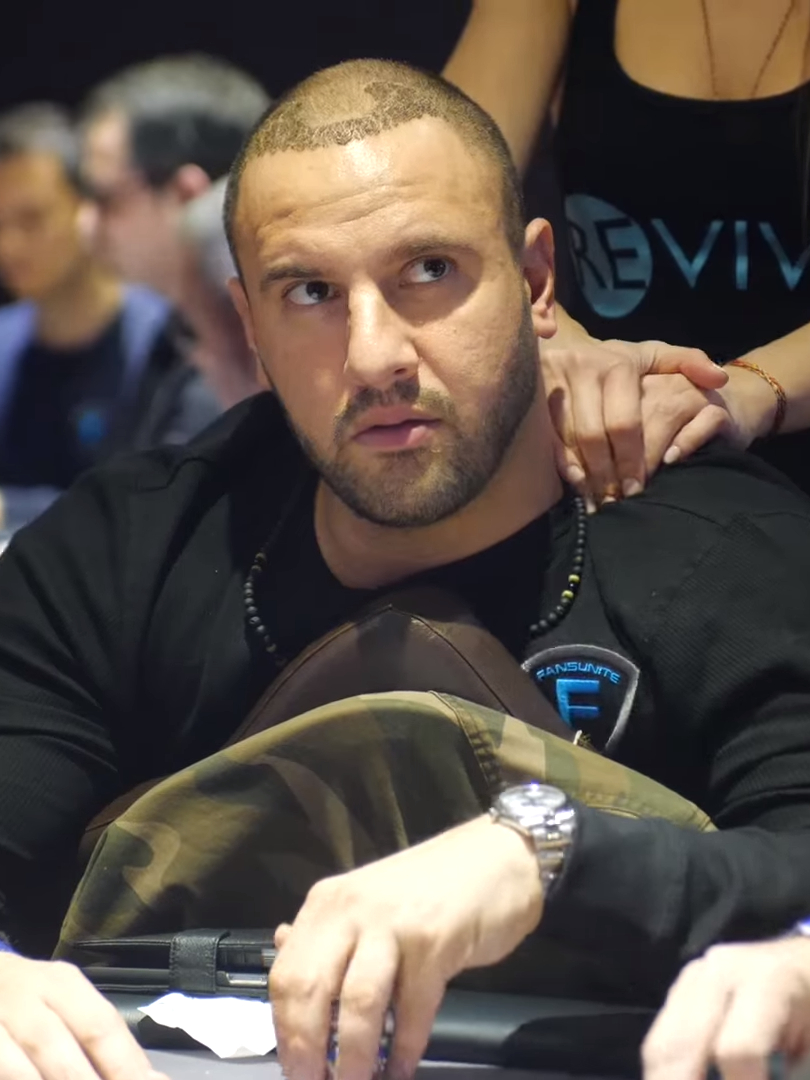
- Mizrachi in 2019
- Nickname: The Grinder
- Born: January 5, 1981 (age 45)

World Series of Poker
- Bracelets: 9
- Final tables: 21
- Money finishes: 93
- Highest WSOP Main Event finish: Winner, 2025

World Poker Tour
- Titles: 3
- Final tables: 7
- Money finishes: 19

European Poker Tour
- Title: None
- Final table: None
- Money finish: 1

Michael David Mizrachi (born January 5, 1981) is an American professional poker player who has won nine bracelets at the World Series of Poker. He holds a record four wins in the $50,000 Poker Players Championship (2010, 2012, 2018, and 2025) and won the Main Event of the 2025 World Series of Poker. Mizrachi also has two World Poker Tour titles, and previously made the final table of another WSOP Main Event, finishing 5th at the 2010 World Series of Poker.

Mizrachi was inducted into the Poker Hall of Fame under extraordinary circumstances following the 2025 Main Event, circumventing the regular election process.

== Personal life ==
Mizrachi was born in Miami, Florida. He is the younger brother of Robert Mizrachi who has numerous World Series of Poker and World Poker Tour finishes to his own name. He has a twin brother Eric Mizrachi (a semi-amateur poker player) and a younger brother, Daniel Jay Mizrachi, who is a professional DJ, also known as DJ Mizrachi; and a casual poker player with three cashes in the Main Event. Mizrachi is fluent in Hebrew, and his father, Ezra Mizrachi, is of Iraqi Jewish origin. Growing up, Mizrachi wanted to become a doctor but dropped out of college to play poker full-time.

Mizrachi has three children: Paul William (named after his grandfather), Julie and Joseph Mizrachi. He lives in Hollywood, Florida. He purchased a motor home out of his poker winnings which he used to keep his family near him when he was on the road, but eventually sold it as it was depreciating in value. In early 2010, a federal tax lien in the amount of $339,711 was filed against Mizrachi for unpaid taxes related to his earnings from 2005 to 2007. Mizrachi also had two residential properties in Florida foreclosed on including a condominium he owned with his brother, Robert. In 2016, Aidiliy Mizrachi, his wife, divorced Michael for irreconcilable differences.

== Poker ==
=== Live poker ===
==== Tournaments ====
As of 2025, Mizrachi's live tournament winnings exceed $28,331,332. His 89 cashes at the WSOP account for over $20,831,322 of those winnings.

===== World Series of Poker =====
In the 2005 World Series of Poker (WSOP), Mizrachi tied the record of seven money finishes in a single year. In the 2008 World Series of Poker, he finished third in the $10,000 Pot-Limit Omaha World Championship. In 2010, Mizrachi won his first bracelet in The Poker Players Championship, defeating Vladimir Shchemelev heads-up and winning $1,559,046. His brother Robert Mizrachi finished 5th in the same event. Later that year, Mizrachi also made the November Nine in the Main Event. He would go on to finish 5th, earning $2,332,992, and was eliminated by eventual winner Jonathan Duhamel. Despite his strong performance at the 2010 WSOP, Frank Kassela was awarded the Player of the Year award based on the pre-existing scoring system. This was controversial because some felt that Mizrachi's year was better, which resulted in a refinement of the scoring system. Mizrachi's success in 2010 led to ESPN poker announcer Norman Chad labelling it "The Year of The Grinder".

In 2011, Mizrachi just missed winning another WSOP title when he took 2nd in the $2,500 Omaha/Stud Eight or Better event for $158,148.

At the 2011 WSOPE, Mizrachi won his second bracelet in the €10,400 No Limit Hold'em (Split Format) by defeating Shawn Buchanan in heads up play, earning €336,008.

Mizrachi made three final tables at the 2012 World Series of Poker and won his second $50,000 Poker Players Championship title, earning $1,451,527, and becoming the event's first two-time champion in the process.

The 2013 WSOP Africa saw Mizrachi win the $3,300 Main Event in a field of 116 players for his first circuit ring earning $101,267 in the process.

In 2018, Mizrachi won the Poker Players Championship for a record-setting 3rd time, earning his 4th bracelet and $1,239,126.

In 2019, Mizrachi won his fifth bracelet in Event #27: Seven Card Stud Hi-Lo 8 or Better, besting a field of 460 players for $142,801. He won a sixth bracelet in the 2024 WSOP Online in the $888 No Limit Hold'em - Crazy 8's Encore event for $108,815.

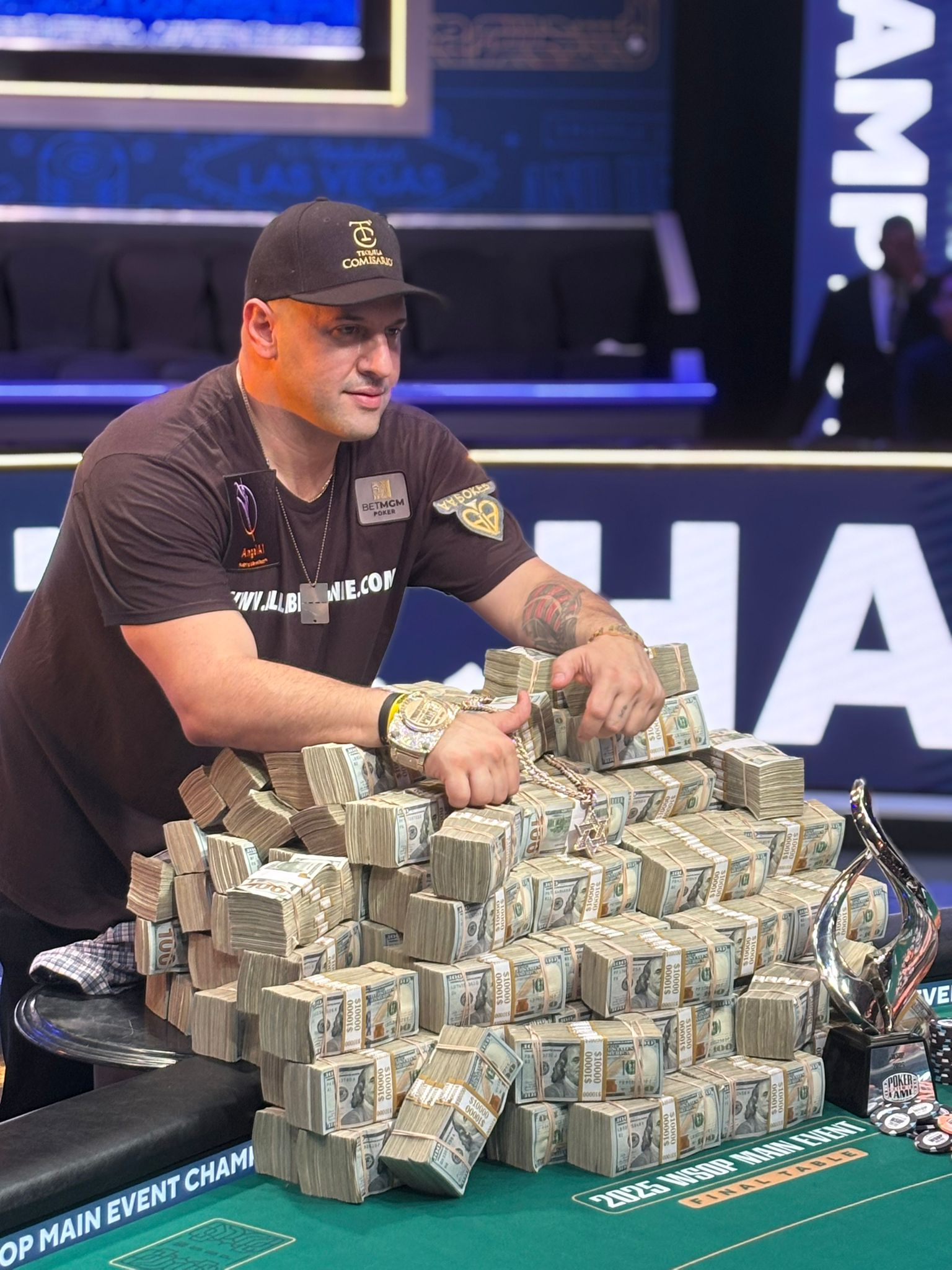
Mizrachi at the 2025 WSOP

During the 2025 series Mizrachi won the Poker Players Championship for a record fourth time, securing his seventh bracelet along with $1,331,322, and breaking a tie with fellow professional and three-time event winner Brian Rast. Mizrachi won the Main Event 19 days later, earning $10,000,000 and his eighth bracelet, as well as being inducted into the Poker Hall of Fame during his bracelet presentation.

At the 2026 World Series of Poker, Mizrachi won his ninth bracelet in the $10,000 Pot-Limit Omaha Championship (Event #70), defeating Zarvan Tumboli heads-up for $1,350,203. It was his first bracelet in a standalone Pot-Limit Omaha event and made him one of eight players to have won at least nine WSOP bracelets.

===== World Poker Tour =====
In January 2005, Mizrachi finished fifth in the World Poker Tour (WPT) World Poker Open at a table also featuring Daniel Negreanu and Scotty Nguyen. The next month, he won a first prize of $1,859,909 at the L.A. Poker Classic, defeating a final table including Ted Forrest and Erick Lindgren. He also finished 11th place (out of 452 entrants) in the $25,000 WPT Championship.

==== Cash games ====
Mizrachi played during the second season of High Stakes Poker.

=== Online poker ===
==== Tournaments ====
In 2024, Mizrachi won the $888 No Limit Hold'em - Crazy 8's Encore (Online Bracelet Event #30) marking his first online bracelet and sixth bracelet overall.

==== Cash games ====
Inspired by his brother Rob’s online poker success Michael started online with Paradise Poker's $5/$10 Limit Hold’em and quickly moved on to PokerStars’ $30/$60 and then $100/$200 games.

=== World Series of Poker bracelets ===
Year	Tournament	Prize (US$)
2010	$50,000 The Poker Player's Championship	$1,559,046
2011E	€10,400 No Limit Hold'em (Split Format)	€336,008
2012	$50,000 The Poker Player's Championship	$1,451,527
2018	$50,000 The Poker Player's Championship	$1,239,126
2019	$1,500 Seven Card Stud Hi-Lo 8 or Better	$142,801
2024O	$888 No Limit Hold'em - Crazy 8's Encore	$108,815
2025	$50,000 The Poker Player's Championship	$1,331,322
2025	$10,000 No-Limit Hold'em Main Event	$10,000,000
2026	$10,000 Pot-Limit Omaha Championship	$1,350,203

An "E" following a year denotes bracelet(s) won at the World Series of Poker Europe
An "O" following a year denotes bracelet(s) won during the World Series of Poker Online

== Awards ==
In 2006, Mizrachi won CardPlayer Magazine's Player of the Year Award.

Mizrachi was named 2010 Poker Player of the Year in ALL IN Magazine.
