= John Hennigan (poker player) =

American poker player (born 1970)

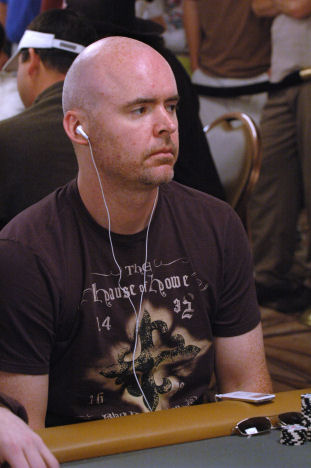
- Hennigan at the 2006 World Series of Poker
- Nickname: Johnny World
- Born: August 10, 1969 (age 57); Philadelphia, Pennsylvania, U.S.

World Series of Poker
- Bracelets: 7
- Final tables: 22
- Money finishes: 63
- Highest WSOP Main Event finish: 19th, 1999

World Poker Tour
- Title: 1
- Final tables: 2
- Money finishes: 12

John L. Hennigan (born August 10, 1969) is an American professional poker player from Philadelphia, Pennsylvania, who, in his career, has won seven World Series of Poker bracelets and a World Poker Tour (WPT) title.

Hennigan is nicknamed "Johnny World" because he is willing to bet on anything in the world.

== World Series of Poker ==
Hennigan finished 19th of 393 entries in the 1999 World Series of Poker (WSOP) $10,000 no limit Texas hold 'em main event.

In April 2002 he made the final table of the WSOP $1,500 seven-card stud event and won his first bracelet just four days later in the $2,000 H.O.R.S.E. event, taking home the $117,320 first prize after defeating a final table including Men Nguyen and Phil Ivey.

In 2004, he won his second WSOP bracelet in the $5,000 limit Texas hold 'em event, defeating a final table that included James McManus, David Chiu and T. J. Cloutier.

Hennigan made another two WSOP final tables in 2005, including a second-place finish in the $5,000 2 to 7 draw lowball no limit event, finishing just behind David Grey.

In 2014, he won the $50,000 Players Championship for over $1.5 million, and collecting his third WSOP bracelet. The Championship is regarded as one of the most prestigious events one can win during a poker career. In the 2016 WSOP, he won his fourth bracelet in the $10,000 2–7 Triple Draw Lowball Limit Championship. At the 2018 WSOP, he won a $10,000 H.O.R.S.E. event for his fifth bracelet and came in second in Poker Players Championship, earning $765,837. At the 2019 WSOP, he won his sixth bracelet in a $10,000 Seven Card Stud Championship event. At the 2024 WSOP, Hennigan won his seventh bracelet in the $1,500 Dealers Choice event.

=== World Series of Poker bracelets ===
Year	Tournament	Prize (US$)
2002	$2,000 Stud Hi/Lo Eight or Better	$117,320
2004	$5,000 Limit Hold 'em	$325,360
2014	$50,000 The Poker Players Championship	$1,517,767
2016	$10,000 Limit 2-7 Lowball Triple Draw Championship	$320,103
2018	$10,000 H.O.R.S.E. Championship	$414,692
2019	$10,000 Seven Card Stud Championship	$245,451
2024	$1,500 Dealer's Choice	$138,296

== World Poker Tour ==
Hennigan has made two World Poker Tour (WPT) final tables, finishing 4th in the Five Diamond World Poker Classic in 2002 won by Gus Hansen then winning the 2007 Borgata Winter Open, earning a little over $1.6 million.

== Other poker events ==
Hennigan won The 2002 United States Poker Championship's $7,500 no limit hold'em main event, defeating Erik Seidel in heads-up play, earning $216,000 prize. He also cashed in the same event in 2003, finishing 5th.

Hennigan was inducted in the Poker Hall of Fame in 2018.

As of 2025, his total live tournament winnings exceed $9,975,000. His cashes as the WSOP account for over $6,300,000 of those winnings.
