= 2022 World Series of Poker results =

Below are the results of the 2022 World Series of Poker, to be held from May 31-July 20 at Bally's and Paris Las Vegas in Las Vegas, Nevada.

== Key ==
*	Elected to the Poker Hall of Fame
(#/#)	This denotes a bracelet winner. The first number is the number of bracelets won in the 2022 WSOP. The second number is the total number of bracelets won. Both numbers represent totals as of that point during the tournament.
Place	What place each player at the final table finished
Name	The player who made it to the final table
Prize (US$)	The amount of money awarded for each finish at the event's final table

== Results ==
=== Event #1: $500 Casino Employees No-Limit Hold'em ===
- 2-Day Event: May 31-June 1
- Number of Entries: 832
- Total Prize Pool: $349,440
- Number of Payouts: 125
- Winning Hand: A♦ Q♠

Final Table
Place	Name	Prize
1st	(United States) Kate Kopp (1/1)	$65,168
2nd	(United States) Wyatt Frost	$40,273
3rd	(United States) Brandon West	$28,356
4th	(United States) Shaun Colquhoun	$20,275
5th	(United States) Joe Chang	$14,725
6th	(United States) Vikram Vijay	$10,865
7th	(United States) Gonzalo Gonzalez	$8,147
8th	(United States) Arturo Jimenez	$6,210
9th	(United States) Kyle Dempsey	$4,813

=== Event #2: $100,000 High Roller Bounty No-Limit Hold'em ===
- 3-Day Event: May 31-June 2
- Number of Entries: 46
- Total Prize Pool: $3,300,500
- Number of Payouts: 7
- Winning Hand: K♥ K♠

Final Table
Place	Name	Prize
1st	(United States) David Peters (1/4)	$1,166,810
2nd	(United States) Chance Kornuth (0/3)	$721,144
3rd	(Italy) Dario Sammartino	$498,696
4th	(Bosnia and Herzegovina) Ali Imsirovic	$350,158
5th	(Germany) Koray Aldemir (0/1)	$249,693
6th	(United States) Mathew Steinberg	$180,872
7th	(United States) Phil Ivey (0/10)	$133,127

=== Event #3: $2,500 Freezeout No-Limit Hold'em ===
- 3-Day Event: June 1–3
- Number of Entries: 752
- Total Prize Pool: $1,673,200
- Number of Payouts: 113
- Winning Hand: Q♥ Q♠

Final Table
Place	Name	Prize
1st	(United States) Scott Seiver (1/4)	$320,059
2nd	(United States) Alexander Farahi	$197,806
3rd	(United States) David Goodman	$139,193
4th	(United States) Steve Zolotow (0/2)	$99,483
5th	(United Kingdom) Sergio Aido	$72,233
6th	(United States) Nick Schulman (0/3)	$53,296
7th	(United Kingdom) Lewis Spencer	$39,970
8th	(United States) Chris Hunichen	$30,478
9th	(India) Aditya Agarwal	$23,634

=== Event #4: $1,500 Dealers Choice 6-Handed ===
- 3-Day Event: June 1–3
- Number of Entries: 430
- Total Prize Pool: $574,050
- Number of Payouts: 65
- Winning Hand: A♣ 9♥ 5♥ 3♣

Final Table
Place	Name	Prize
1st	(United States) Brad Ruben (1/4)	$126,288
2nd	(Canada) Jaswinder Lally (0/1)	$78,048
3rd	(Japan) Naoya Kihara (0/1)	$52,282
4th	(United States) Ben Yu (0/4)	$35,793
5th	(United States) Jorge Walker	$25,056
6th	(United States) Charles Bransford	$17,944

=== Event #5: $500 The Housewarming No-Limit Hold'em ===
- 6-Day Event: June 2–7
- Number of Entries: 20,080
- Total Prize Pool: $8,435,280
- Number of Payouts: 2,778
- Winning Hand: A♣ 3♠

Final Table
Place	Name	Prize
1st	(United States) Henrieto Acain (1/1)	$701,215
2nd	(United States) Jared Kingery	$433,255
3rd	(United States) Christian Taylor	$326,965
4th	(United States) Orez Mokedi	$248,340
5th	(United States) Jen-Yue Chiang	$189,850
6th	(United States) Darnell White	$146,080
7th	(United States) Jordan Hufty (0/1)	$113,145
8th	(United States) Erik Carvalho	$88,214
9th	(United States) Isidro Martinez	$69,235

=== Event #6: $25,000 Heads Up No-Limit Hold'em Championship ===
- 3-Day Event: June 2–4
- Number of Entries: 64
- Total Prize Pool: $1,512,000
- Number of Payouts: 8
- Winning Hand: A♥ 4♦

Final Table
Place	Name	Prize
1st	(United States) Dan Smith (1/1)	$509,717
2nd	(Germany) Christoph Vogelsang	$315,029
SF	(Italy) Dario Sammartino	$193,537
SF	(United States) Kevin Rabichow	$193,537
QF	(United States) Sean Winter	$75,045
QF	(United States) Jonathan Jaffe	$75,045
QF	(United States) Chance Kornuth (0/3)	$75,045
QF	(United States) Dylan DeStefano	$75,045

=== Event #7: $1,500 Omaha Hi-Lo 8 or Better ===
- 3-Day Event: June 3–5
- Number of Entries: 1,086
- Total Prize Pool: $1,449,810
- Number of Payouts: 164
- Winning Hand: 9♠ 8♦ 7♣ 6♠

Final Table
Place	Name	Prize
1st	(United States) Amnon Filippi (1/1)	$252,718
2nd	(United States) Matt Vengrin	$156,198
3rd	(United States) Paul Zappulla	$111,501
4th	(Brazil) Murilo Figueredo	$80,671
5th	(United States) Matthew Glantz	$59,166
6th	(United States) David Funkhouser	$43,997
7th	(United States) Rami Boukai	$33,178
8th	(Australia) Mel Judah (0/2)	$25,377
9th	(Republic of Ireland) Ronan Nally	$19,692

=== Event #8: $25,000 High Roller No-Limit Hold'em 8-Handed ===
- 3-Day Event: June 4–6
- Number of Entries: 251
- Total Prize Pool: $5,929,875
- Number of Payouts: 38
- Winning Hand: K♥ 3♦

Final Table
Place	Name	Prize
1st	(United States) Chad Eveslage (1/1)	$1,415,610
2nd	(United States) Jake Schindler	$874,915
3rd	(United States) Josh Arieh (0/4)	$616,047
4th	(United States) Chris Brewer	$442,213
5th	(United States) Brek Schutten	$323,730
6th	(Germany) Koray Aldemir (0/1)	$241,791
7th	(United States) Antonio Lievano	$184,324
8th	(Bulgaria) Ognyan Dimov (0/1)	$143,480

=== Event #9: $1,500 Seven Card Stud ===
- 3-Day Event: June 4–6
- Number of Entries: 329
- Total Prize Pool: $439,215
- Number of Payouts: 50
- Winning Hand: J♠ 9♣ 9♥ 9♠ 3♦ 2♣ 2♠

Final Table
Place	Name	Prize
1st	(Canada) Alex Livingston (1/1)	$103,282
2nd	(United States) Daniel Weinman	$63,835
3rd	(Canada) Thomas Taylor	$44,112
4th	(United States) Hojeong Lee	$31,083
5th	(United States) Kenny Hsiung (0/1)	$22,344
6th	(United States) John Racener (0/1)	$16,391
7th	(United States) Brad Ruben (1/4)	$12,276
8th	(United States) John Evans	$9,391

=== Event #10: $10,000 Dealers Choice 6-Handed Championship ===
- 3-Day Event: June 5–7
- Number of Entries: 123
- Total Prize Pool: $1,146,975
- Number of Payouts: 19
- Winning Hand: 7♦ 7♣

Final Table
Place	Name	Prize
1st	(United States) Ben Diebold (1/1)	$299,488
2nd	(Russia) Mike Gorodinsky (0/2)	$185,095
3rd	(United States) Brian Rast (0/5)	$134,370
4th	(United States) Christopher Claassen	$98,738
5th	(Japan) Naoya Kihara (0/1)	$73,453
6th	(United States) Randy Ohel (0/1)	$55,329

=== Event #11: $600 No-Limit Hold'em Deepstack ===
- 2-Day Event: June 6–7
- Number of Entries: 5,715
- Total Prize Pool: $2,914,650
- Number of Payouts: 858
- Winning Hand: A♠ K♥

Final Table
Place	Name	Prize
1st	(United States) Raj Vohra (1/1)	$335,286
2nd	(United States) Qing Liu	$207,192
3rd	(United States) Hung Tran	$154,831
4th	(United States) Nicole Limo Greene	$116,568
5th	(United States) Michael Lin	$88,417
6th	(United States) Junxiu Zhang	$67,572
7th	(Canada) Ralph Marquez	$52,035
8th	(United States) Stanislav Snitsar	$40,378
9th	(France) Renaud Cellini	$31,574

=== Event #12: $50,000 High Roller No-Limit Hold'em 8-Handed ===
- 3-Day Event: June 6–8
- Number of Entries: 101
- Total Prize Pool: $4,835,375
- Number of Payouts: 16
- Winning Hand: A♣ K♥

Final Table
Place	Name	Prize
1st	(United States) Jake Schindler (1/1)	$1,328,068
2nd	(United States) Brek Schutten	$820,808
3rd	(Thailand) Punnat Punsri	$593,481
4th	(United States) Shannon Shorr	$436,412
5th	(United States) David Peters (1/4)	$326,464
6th	(United States) Andrew Lichtenberger (0/1)	$248,516
7th	(United States) Michael Rocco (0/1)	$192,570
8th	(Italy) Dario Sammartino	$151,942

=== Event #13: $1,500 Limit Hold'em ===
- 3-Day Event: June 6–8
- Number of Entries: 522
- Total Prize Pool: $696,870
- Number of Payouts: 79
- Winning Hand: 3♦ 2♦

Final Table
Place	Name	Prize
1st	(United States) Michael Moncek (1/1)	$145,856
2nd	(United States) Ben Ross	$90,150
3rd	(China) Yueqi Zhu (0/1)	$63,314
4th	(United States) Christoph Kwon	$45,178
5th	(United States) Joe McKeehen (0/3)	$32,761
6th	(United States) Steven Wolansky	$24,149
7th	(United States) Fred Lavassani	$18,100
8th	(United States) Nicholas Pupillo	$13,798
9th	(United States) Lee Markholt	$10,701

=== Event #14: $1,500 No-Limit Hold'em 6-Handed ===
- 3-Day Event: June 7–9
- Number of Entries: 2,392
- Total Prize Pool: $3,193,320
- Number of Payouts: 359
- Winning Hand:J♣ 3♥

Final Table
Place	Name	Prize
1st	(France) Leo Soma (1/1)	$456,889
2nd	(United States) Thomas Schultz	$282,358
3rd	(Argentina) Maximilian Gallardo	$203,451
4th	(United States) Daniel Wellborn	$148,171
5th	(United States) Derek Sudell	$109,083
6th	(Bulgaria) Ivan Zhechev	$81,188

=== Event #15: $10,000 Omaha Hi-Lo 8 or Better Championship ===
- 4-Day Event: June 7–10
- Number of Entries: 196
- Total Prize Pool: $1,827,700
- Number of Payouts: 30
- Winning Hand: K♦ K♣ 5♦ 2♣

Final Table
Place	Name	Prize
1st	(United States) Daniel Zack (1/2)	$440,757
2nd	(United States) Dustin Dirksen	$272,408
3rd	(Israel) Yuval Bronshtein (0/2)	$195,203
4th	(United States) Ray Dehkharghani (0/1)	$142,456
5th	(United States) Jake Liebeskind	$105,913
6th	(United States) Bart O'Connell	$80,250
7th	(Canada) Alex Livingston (1/1)	$61,991
8th	(United States) Kane Kalas	$48,839
9th	(United States) Raymond Henson	$39,258

=== Event #16: $3,000 No-Limit Hold'em ===
- 4-Day Event: June 8–11
- Number of Entries: 1,240
- Total Prize Pool: $3,310,800
- Number of Payouts: 186
- Winning Hand: A♦ 7♣

Final Table
Place	Name	Prize
1st	(Austria) Stefan Lehner (1/1)	$558,616
2nd	(United States) Toby Boas	$345,244
3rd	(United States) Nathan Russler	$248,298
4th	(United States) David Miscikowski (0/1)	$180,795
5th	(United States) Alex Foxen	$133,300
6th	(United States) Kevin Stevens	$99,535
7th	(United States) Joey Weissman (0/1)	$75,282
8th	(United States) Nicholas Dolen	$57,683
9th	(Italy) Davide Suriano (0/1)	$44,785

=== Event #17: $2,500 Mixed Triple Draw Lowball ===
- 3-Day Event: June 8–10
- Number of Entries: 309
- Total Prize Pool: $687,525
- Number of Payouts: 47
- Winning Hand: 7♥ 6♥ 5♠ 2♠ A♠ (A-5 Lowball Triple Draw)

Final Table
Place	Name	Prize
1st	(United States) Domnick Sarle (1/1)	$164,243
2nd	(United States) Jerry Wong	$101,514
3rd	(United States) Daniel Strelitz (0/1)	$67,820
4th	(United States) John Monnette (0/4)	$46,294
5th	(United States) Matthew Schreiber (0/1)	$32,033
6th	(United States) Alex Epstein (0/1)	$23,052

=== Event #18: $1,000 Freezeout No-Limit Hold'em ===
- 2-Day Event: June 9–10
- Number of Entries: 2,663
- Total Prize Pool: $2,370,070
- Number of Payouts: 400
- Winning Hand: A♣ Q♠

Final Table
Place	Name	Prize
1st	(United States) Bryan Schultz (1/1)	$330,057
2nd	(United States) Young Sik Eum	$203,949
3rd	(United States) Angela Jordison	$151,544
4th	(United States) Harry Rubin	$113,532
5th	(United States) Nick Palma	$85,761
6th	(United States) Robert Hofer	$65,326
7th	(United States) Tony Dam	$50,180
8th	(United States) Michael Holtz	$38,874
9th	(United States) Kevin Legerski	$30,375

=== Event #19: $25,000 High Roller Pot-Limit Omaha ===
- 4-Day Event: June 9–12
- Number of Entries: 264
- Total Prize Pool: $6,237,000
- Number of Payouts: 40
- Winning Hand: A♥ K♠ 10♦ 3♣

Final Table
Place	Name	Prize
1st	(China) Tong Li (1/1)	$1,467,739
2nd	(Germany) Fabian Brandes	$907,132
3rd	(United States) Josh Arieh (0/4)	$644,365
4th	(United States) Sam Stein	$465,717
5th	(United States) Scott Ball (0/2)	$342,590
6th	(United States) Jonathan Depa	$256,582
7th	(United States) Emmanuel Sebag	$195,713
8th	(United States) Gregory Shuda	$152,091

=== Event #20: $1,500 Limit 2-7 Lowball Triple Draw ===
- 3-Day Event: June 9–11
- Number of Entries: 350
- Total Prize Pool: $467,250
- Number of Payouts: 53
- Winning Hand: 7♦ 6♦ 4♦ 3♣ 2♥

Final Table
Place	Name	Prize
1st	(Russia) Denis Nesterenko (1/1)	$108,250
2nd	(United States) Von Altizer	$66,910
3rd	(United States) Evan Sayer	$44,347
4th	(United States) Hieu Luu	$30,107
5th	(China) Yufei Zhong	$20,948
6th	(United Kingdom) Benny Glaser (0/4)	$14,947

=== Event #21: $1,500 Monster Stack No-Limit Hold'em ===
- 5-Day Event: June 10–14
- Number of Entries: 6,051
- Total Prize Pool: $3,934,245
- Number of Payouts: 976
- Winning Hand: A♥ 8♣

Final Table
Place	Name	Prize
1st	(United States) Mike Jukich (1/1)	$966,577
2nd	(Germany) Mateusz Moolhuizen	$597,362
3rd	(United States) Francis Anderson	$449,912
4th	(Brazil) João Simão (0/1)	$341,095
5th	(United States) Anthony Spinella (0/1)	$260,315
6th	(United States) David Zarrin	$199,995
7th	(Japan) Yoshiya Agata	$154,688
8th	(Austria) Jessica Teusl	$120,455
9th	(Portugal) Ricardo Caridade	$94,439

=== Event #22: $10,000 Seven Card Stud Championship ===
- 3-Day Event: June 10–12
- Number of Entries: 95
- Total Prize Pool: $885,875
- Number of Payouts: 15
- Winning Hand: K♣ K♠ Q♦ 7♦ 6♦ 5♥ 4♠

Final Table
Place	Name	Prize
1st	(United States) Adam Friedman (1/5)	$248,254
2nd	(United States) Jean Gaspard (0/1)	$153,433
3rd	(United States) Phil Ivey (0/10)	$108,233
4th	(Israel) Yuval Bronshtein (0/2)	$78,348
5th	(United States) Ben Diebold (1/1)	$58,239
6th	(United States) Marco Johnson (0/2)	$44,487
7th	(United States) James Paluszek	$34,939
8th	(China) Yueqi Zhu (0/1)	$28,258

=== Event #23: $3,000 Limit Hold'em 6-Handed ===
- 3-Day Event: June 11–13
- Number of Entries: 213
- Total Prize Pool: $568,710
- Number of Payouts: 32
- Winning Hand: K♠ 5♦

Final Table
Place	Name	Prize
1st	(United States) Jeremy Ausmus (1/4)	$142,147
2nd	(United States) Michael Rocco (0/1)	$87,854
3rd	(United States) Gabe Ramos	$59,486
4th	(United States) Zachary Grech	$41,191
5th	(United States) Mike Lancaster	$29,185
6th	(United States) Andrew Kelsall (0/1)	$21,170

=== Event #24: $1,000 Flip & Go No-Limit Hold'em ===
- 2-Day Event: June 12–13
- Number of Entries: 1,329
- Total Prize Pool: $1,182,810
- Number of Payouts: 157
- Winning Hand: A♠ K♦

Final Table
Place	Name	Prize
1st	(United States) Christopher Chatman (1/1)	$187,770
2nd	(Israel) Rafi Elharar	$116,050
3rd	(United States) Tyler Willse	$85,420
4th	(United States) Ian Steinman (0/1)	$63,530
5th	(Taiwan) Pete Chen (0/1)	$47,760
6th	(United States) Austin Apicella	$36,290
7th	(United States) Zach Cheatum	$27,880
8th	(Greece) Georgios Sotiropoulos (0/3)	$21,660
9th	(United States) Mike Matusow (0/4)	$17,010

=== Event #25: $800 No-Limit Hold'em Deepstack ===
- 2-Day Event: June 12–13
- Number of Entries: 4,062
- Total Prize Pool: $2,859,648
- Number of Payouts: 610
- Winning Hand: 6♣ 3♣

Final Table
Place	Name	Prize
1st	(United States) Rajaee "Rob" Wazwaz (1/1)	$358,346
2nd	(United States) Robert Crow	$221,399
3rd	(United States) Terence Reid	$166,011
4th	(United States) Sean Legendre	$125,371
5th	(Canada) Dov Markowich	$95,363
6th	(Canada) Maxime Duhamel	$73,064
7th	(India) Abhinav Iyer (0/1)	$56,388
8th	(France) Sebastien Clot	$43,839
9th	(Israel) Liran Betito	$34,336

=== Event #26: $10,000 Limit Hold'em Championship ===
- 3-Day Event: June 12–14
- Number of Entries: 92
- Total Prize Pool: $857,900
- Number of Payouts: 14
- Winning Hand: K♠ 9♦

Final Table
Place	Name	Prize
1st	(Canada) Jonathan Cohen (1/1)	$245,678
2nd	(United States) Kyle Dilschneider	$151,842
3rd	(United States) Matthew Schreiber (0/1)	$107,978
4th	(United States) Matthew Gonzales	$78,435
5th	(United States) Joseph Couden (0/1)	$58,226
6th	(United States) Chad Eveslage (1/1)	$44,194
7th	(United States) Matt Woodward	$34,314
8th	(United States) Amir Shayesteh	$27,269
9th	(United States) David Litt	$22,192

=== Event #27: $1,500 Shootout No-Limit Hold'em ===
- 3-Day Event: June 13–15
- Number of Entries: 1,000
- Total Prize Pool: $1,335,000
- Number of Payouts: 100
- Winning Hand: A♥ 5♣

Final Table
Place	Name	Prize
1st	(United States) Michael Simhai (1/1)	$240,480
2nd	(United States) David Dowdy	$148,618
3rd	(United States) Anant Patel	$111,226
4th	(United States) Ravi Raghavan	$84,047
5th	(United States) Timothy McDermott	$64,129
6th	(United States) Roongsak Griffeth	$49,414
7th	(United States) Austin Peck	$38,455
8th	(United States) David Yonnotti	$30,227
9th	(United States) Kevin Song (0/1)	$24,001

=== Event #28: $50,000 High Roller Pot-Limit Omaha ===
- 3-Day Event: June 13–15
- Number of Entries: 106
- Total Prize Pool: $5,074,750
- Number of Payouts: 16
- Winning Hand: J♦ 9♣ 8♦ 5♠

Final Table
Place	Name	Prize
1st	(United Kingdom) Robert Cowen (1/2)	$1,393,816
2nd	(United States) Dash Dudley (0/2)	$861,442
3rd	(United States) Ben Lamb (0/1)	$622,861
4th	(Bulgaria) Veselin Karakitukov	$458,016
5th	(United States) Jared Bleznick	$342,626
6th	(United States) Jason Mercier (0/5)	$260,819
7th	(United States) Aaron Katz (0/1)	$202,103
8th	(United States) Scott Seiver (1/4)	$159,464
9th	(United States) Aaron Mermelstein	$128,159

=== Event #29: $1,500 No-Limit 2-7 Lowball Draw ===
- 3-Day Event: June 13–15
- Number of Entries: 437
- Total Prize Pool: $583,395
- Number of Payouts: 66
- Winning Hand: 9♦ 7♠ 6♣ 5♠ 3♦

Final Table
Place	Name	Prize
1st	(United States) Maxx Coleman (1/1)	$127,809
2nd	(United States) Thomas Newton	$78,997
3rd	(United States) Roland Israelashvili	$53,828
4th	(Brazil) Yuri Dzivielevski (0/2)	$37,379
5th	(United States) Kenneth Po	$26,464
6th	(Mexico) Tomas Szwarcberg	$19,108

=== Event #30: $1,000 Pot-Limit Omaha 8-Handed ===
- 3-Day Event: June 14–16
- Number of Entries: 1,891
- Total Prize Pool: $1,682,990
- Number of Payouts: 284
- Winning Hand: A♣ 10♦ 4♦ 2♠

Final Table
Place	Name	Prize
1st	(United States) Daniel Weinman (1/1)	$255,359
2nd	(United States) Jamey Hendrickson	$157,819
3rd	(Colombia) Eduardo Bernal Sanchez	$116,751
4th	(United States) Germandio Andoni	$87,167
5th	(United States) Chino Rheem	$65,685
6th	(Hungary) Ferenc Deak	$49,962
7th	(United States) Stephen Song (0/1)	$38,363
8th	(United States) Ruslan Dykshteyn	$29,739

=== Event #31: $10,000 Limit 2-7 Lowball Triple Draw Championship ===
- 3-Day Event: June 14–16
- Number of Entries: 118
- Total Prize Pool: $1,100,350
- Number of Payouts: 18
- Winning Hand: 8♠ 6♣ 5♠ 4♥ 2♦

Final Table
Place	Name	Prize
1st	(United States) Brian Hastings (1/6)	$292,146
2nd	(United States) Eric Wasserson	$180,559
3rd	(United States) Daniel Zack (1/2)	$129,670
4th	(United States) Shaun Deeb (0/5)	$94,606
5th	(United States) Marco Johnson (0/2)	$70,139
6th	(United States) Jordan Siegel	$52,854

=== Event #32: $1,500 H.O.R.S.E. ===
- 3-Day Event: June 15–17
- Number of Entries: 773
- Total Prize Pool: $1,031,955
- Number of Payouts: 116
- Winning Hand: J♣ 10♣ 9♣ 7♣ 7♦ 4♣ 2♣ (Seven Card Stud Hi-Lo 8 or Better)

Final Table
Place	Name	Prize
1st	(United States) Steve Albini (1/2)	$196,089
2nd	(Canada) James Morgan	$121,195
3rd	(United States) Jason Daly	$85,943
4th	(United States) Richard Bai	$61,862
5th	(United States) Kyle Loman	$45,209
6th	(United States) Peter Brownstein	$33,552
7th	(United States) Eddy Vataru	$25,294
8th	(Japan) Tamon Nakamura	$19,373

=== Event #33: $3,000 No-Limit Hold'em 6-Handed ===
- 2-Day Event: June 15–16
- Number of Entries: 1,348
- Total Prize Pool: $3,599,160
- Number of Payouts: 203
- Winning Hand: 5♦ 4♦

Final Table
Place	Name	Prize
1st	(Germany) Nino Ullmann (1/1)	$594,079
2nd	(United States) Timothy Flank	$367,181
3rd	(United States) Anthony Hu	$257,821
4th	(United States) Darren Elias	$183,616
5th	(United States) David Peters (1/4)	$132,662
6th	(Spain) Lander Lijo	$97,256

=== Event #34: $1,500 Freezeout No-Limit Hold'em ===
- 3-Day Event: June 16–18
- Number of Entries: 1,774
- Total Prize Pool: $2,368,290
- Number of Payouts: 266
- Winning Hand: 6♣ 5♥

Final Table
Place	Name	Prize
1st	(United States) Justin Pechie (1/2)	$364,899
2nd	(France) Samuel Bifarella	$225,506
3rd	(France) Maxime Parys	$164,469
4th	(United States) Kenny Robbins	$121,224
5th	(United States) Steve Zolotow (0/2)	$90,306
6th	(United States) David Dibernardi	$68,002
7th	(France) Michel Leibgorin	$51,766
8th	(United States) Jeremy Wien (0/1)	$39,843
9th	(United States) Dwayne Sullivan	31,009

=== Event #35: $2,500 Mixed Big Bet Event ===
- 3-Day Event: June 16–18
- Number of Entries: 281
- Total Prize Pool: $625,225
- Number of Payouts: 43
- Winning Hand: A♥ 10♥ (No-Limit Hold'em)

Final Table
Place	Name	Prize
1st	(Hong Kong) Lok Chan (1/1)	$144,338
2nd	(Canada) Drew Scott	$89,206
3rd	(United States) Rami Boukai (0/2)	$61,675
4th	(United States) Michael Trivett	$43,378
5th	(United States) Christopher Smith	$31,045
6th	(United States) Galen Hall (0/1)	$22,617

=== Event #36: $1,500 Seven Card Stud Hi-Lo 8 or Better ===
- 3-Day Event: June 16–18
- Number of Entries: 471
- Total Prize Pool: $628,785
- Number of Payouts: 71
- Winning Hand: A♠ Q♣ 10♦ 5♣ 4♥ 3♠ 2♥

Final Table
Place	Name	Prize
1st	(United States) Ali Eslami (1/1)	$135,260
2nd	(United States) Chris Papastratis	$83,598
3rd	(United States) Jeff Madsen (0/4)	$58,537
4th	(United States) Scott Lake	$41,693
5th	(Canada) Thomas Taylor	$30,215
6th	(United States) Kenny Hsiung (0/1)	$22,287
7th	(United States) John Holley	$16,737
8th	(United States) David Arganian	$12,801

=== Event #37: $1,500 Millionaire Maker No-Limit Hold'em ===
- 5-Day Event: June 17–21
- Number of Entries: 7,961
- Total Prize Pool: $10,627,935
- Number of Payouts: 1,195
- Winning Hand: A♣ A♥

Final Table
Place	Name	Prize
1st	(Bulgaria) Yuliyan Kolev (1/2)	$1,125,189
2nd	(Israel) Oren Rosen	$695,390
3rd	(United States) Tyler Gaston	$522,705
4th	(Australia) Yita Choong	$395,545
5th	(United States) Dominic Brazier	$301,346
6th	(United States) Stanley Weng	$231,145
7th	(Brazil) Alen Tenorio	$178,515
8th	(France) Bastien Joly	$138,821
9th	(United Kingdom) Nick Marchington	$108,704

=== Event #38: $10,000 No-Limit 2-7 Lowball Draw Championship ===
- 3-Day Event: June 17–19
- Number of Entries: 121
- Total Prize Pool: $1,128,325
- Number of Payouts: 19
- Winning Hand: 9♥ 8♠ 5♠ 3♥ 2♠

Final Table
Place	Name	Prize
1st	(Brazil) Pedro Bromfman (1/1)	$294,616
2nd	(United States) Scott Seiver (1/4)	$182,086
3rd	(United States) Cary Katz	$131,362
4th	(Canada) Alex Livingston (1/1)	$96,104
5th	(Brazil) Yuri Dzivielevski (0/2)	$71,315
6th	(Iran) Farzad Bonyadi (0/4)	$53,687

=== Event #39: $3,000 Pot-Limit Omaha 6-Handed ===
- 4-Day Event: June 18–21
- Number of Entries: 719
- Total Prize Pool: $1,919,730
- Number of Payouts: 108
- Winning Hand: K♣ Q♠ J♠ 7♦

Final Table
Place	Name	Prize
1st	(Germany) Fabian Brandes (1/1)	$371,358
2nd	(Israel) Leonid Yanovski	$229,529
3rd	(United States) Sean Winter	$156,401
4th	(United States) Thomas Morrison	$108,604
5th	(Hungary) Ferenc Deak	$76,880
6th	(Germany) Grzegorz Derkowski	$55,501

=== Event #40: $10,000 Seven Card Stud Hi-Lo 8 or Better Championship ===
- 3-Day Event: June 18–20
- Number of Entries: 137
- Total Prize Pool: $1,277,525
- Number of Payouts: 21
- Winning Hand: A♣ A♠ K♣ 7♦ 3♦ 2♣ 2♥

Final Table
Place	Name	Prize
1st	(United States) Daniel Zack (2/3)	$324,174
2nd	(United States) David Funkhouser	$200,356
3rd	(United States) Ziya Rahim	$147,800
4th	(United States) Eric Kurtzman	$110,379
5th	(United States) Shaun Deeb (0/5)	$83,465
6th	(United States) Chad Eveslage (1/1)	$63,914
7th	(United States) Brian Hastings (1/6)	$49,571
8th	(United States) Steven Loube (0/1)	$38,947

=== Event #41: $1,000 Super Turbo Bounty No-Limit Hold'em ===
- 1-Day Event: June 19
- Number of Entries: 2,227
- Total Prize Pool: $1,982,030
- Number of Payouts: 335
- Winning Hand: 7♥ 7♦

Final Table
Place	Name	Prize
1st	(United States) Ramsey Stovall (1/1)	$191,268
2nd	(United States) Timothy Heng	$118,213
3rd	(United States) Stephen Frakes	$87,047
4th	(United States) Wing Yam	$64,702
5th	(United States) Larry Carillo	$48,551
6th	(United States) Rafael Lebron (0/2)	$36,782
7th	(United States) Edwin Chang	$28,136
8th	(United States) Louise Francoeur	$21,733
9th	(United States) Wen Ni	$16,953

=== Event #42: $100,000 High Roller No-Limit Hold'em ===
- 3-Day Event: June 19–21
- Number of Entries: 62
- Total Prize Pool: $5,998,500
- Number of Payouts: 10
- Winning Hand: 8♦ 6♠

Final Table
Place	Name	Prize
1st	(Latvia) Aleksejs Ponakovs (1/2)	$1,897,363
2nd	(United States) Phil Ivey (0/10)	$1,172,659
3rd	(United Kingdom) Benjamin Heath (0/1)	$805,024
4th	(United States) Gregory Jensen	$571,896
5th	(United States) Michael Moncek (1/1)	$420,944
6th	(United Kingdom) Talal Shakerchi	$321,437
7th	(Belarus) Mikita Badziakouski (0/1)	$255,001
8th	(Japan) Masashi Oya	$210,485
9th	(United States) Nick Petrangelo (0/2)	$181,068

=== Event #43: $500 Freezeout No-Limit Hold'em ===
- 2-Day Event: June 20–21
- Number of Entries: 4,786
- Total Prize Pool: $2,010,120
- Number of Payouts: 718
- Winning Hand: J♣ 2♣

Final Table
Place	Name	Prize
1st	(United States) David Perry (1/1)	$241,729
2nd	(United Kingdom) Chris Moorman (0/2)	$149,405
3rd	(United States) Daniel Eichhorn	$111,341
4th	(United States) Josh Prager	$83,623
5th	(France) Sebastien Guidez	$63,302
6th	(United States) Phong Than Nguyen	$48,299
7th	(United States) Elven Espinar	$37,148
8th	(United States) Henry Reyes	$28,802
9th	(United States) Daniel Marcus	$22,512

=== Event #44: $10,000 H.O.R.S.E. Championship ===
- 4-Day Event: June 20–23
- Number of Entries: 192
- Total Prize Pool: $1,790,400
- Number of Payouts: 32
- Winning Hand: A♦ A♥ K♦ K♠ (Omaha Hi-Lo 8 or Better)

Final Table
Place	Name	Prize
1st	(United States) Andrew Yeh (1/1)	$487,129
2nd	(United States) Craig Chait	$301,068
3rd	(United Kingdom) Philip Long (0/1)	$209,424
4th	(United States) Bryce Yockey (0/1)	$148,896
5th	(United States) John Racener (0/1)	$108,253
6th	(United Kingdom) Paul Sokoloff	$80,523
7th	(Russia) Mike Gorodinsky (0/2)	$61,314
8th	(United States) Eric Wasserson	$47,819

=== Event #45: $1,500 Pot-Limit Omaha 8-Handed ===
- 3-Day Event: June 21–23
- Number of Entries: 1,437
- Total Prize Pool: $1,918,395
- Number of Payouts: 216
- Winning Hand: A♥ J♣ 8♣ 7♣

Final Table
Place	Name	Prize
1st	(United States) Phil Hui (1/3)	$311,782
2nd	(France) Daniel Tordjman	$192,674
3rd	(United States) Charles Coultas	$140,783
4th	(United States) Shane Nardiello	$103,979
5th	(United States) David Williams (0/1)	$77,635
6th	(United States) Paul Fehlig	$58,606
7th	(United States) Dylan Weisman (0/1)	$44,735
8th	(Canada) Dylan Smith	$34,532

=== Event #46: $5,000 No-Limit Hold'em 6-Handed ===
- 4-Day Event: June 21–24
- Number of Entries: 850
- Total Prize Pool: $3,920,625
- Number of Payouts: 138
- Winning Hand: Q♠ J♣

Final Table
Place	Name	Prize
1st	(France) Jonathan Pastore (1/1)	$771,765
2nd	(United States) Stephen Song (0/1)	$476,990
3rd	(Canada) Tamer Alkamli	$331,503
4th	(United States) Elio Fox (0/2)	$234,036
5th	(Greece) Paraskevas Tsokaridis	$167,882
6th	(United Kingdom) Patrick Sekinger	$122,395

=== Event #47: $1,000 Seniors No-Limit Hold'em Championship ===
- 5-Day Event: June 22–26
- Number of Entries: 5,121
- Total Prize Pool: $4,557,690
- Number of Payouts: 1,079
- Winning Hand: 8♥ 8♠

Final Table
Place	Name	Prize
1st	(United States) Eric Smidinger (1/1)	$694,909
2nd	(United States) Ben Sarnoff	$429,420
3rd	(United States) Charles Mitchell	$323,057
4th	(Italy) Biagio Morciano	$244,664
5th	(United States) Kathy Liebert (0/1)	$186,541
6th	(Australia) Jan Pettersson	$143,189
7th	(Argentina) Andres Korn (0/1)	$110,662
8th	(United States) Mark Pett	$86,112
9th	(United States) Alexander Hill	$67,471

=== Event #48: $1,500 Eight Game Mix ===
- 3-Day Event: June 22–24
- Number of Entries: 695
- Total Prize Pool: $927,825
- Number of Payouts: 105
- Winning Hand: 9♠ 5♣ 5♦ 4♦ (Pot Limit Omaha)

Final Table
Place	Name	Prize
1st	(Cyprus) Menikos Panagiotou (1/1)	$180,783
2nd	(United States) Nick Yunis	$111,724
3rd	(United States) Joon Park	$75,938
4th	(United States) Eric Buchman (0/2)	$52,621
5th	(United States) Jason Stockfish	$37,188
6th	(United States) Jake Liebeskind	$26,814

=== Event #49: $2,000 No-Limit Hold'em ===
- 3-Day Event: June 23–25
- Number of Entries: 1,977
- Total Prize Pool: $3,519,060
- Number of Payouts: 297
- Winning Hand: A♣ Q♦

Final Table
Place	Name	Prize
1st	(Bulgaria) Simeon Spasov (1/1)	$527,944
2nd	(Canada) Mike Watson	$326,296
3rd	(Portugal) Daniel Custodio	$239,679
4th	(Greece) Ioannis Angelou Konstas	$177,761
5th	(Brazil) Walter Ripper	$133,129
6th	(Germany) Christopher Frank (0/1)	$100,688
7th	(United States) Evan Sandberg	$76,912
8th	(United States) Jack Corrigan	$59,343
9th	(South Korea) Hyunwoo Lim	$46,253

=== Event #50: $250,000 Super High Roller No-Limit Hold'em ===
- 3-Day Event: June 23–25
- Number of Entries: 56
- Total Prize Pool: $13,944,000
- Number of Payouts: 9
- Winning Hand: Q♠ 10♥

Final Table
Place	Name	Prize
1st	(United States) Alex Foxen (1/1)	$4,563,700
2nd	(United States) Brandon Steven	$2,820,581
3rd	(United States) Chris Hunichen	$1,931,718
4th	(Spain) Adrian Mateos (0/4)	$1,367,206
5th	(United States) Sam Soverel (0/1)	$1,001,142
6th	(Czech Republic) Martin Kabrhel (0/2)	$759,362
7th	(United States) Phil Ivey (0/10)	$597,381
8th	(United States) Daniel Zack (2/3)	$488,095
9th	(Denmark) Henrik Hecklen	$414,815

=== Event #51: $400 Colossus No-Limit Hold'em ===
- 4-Day Event: June 24–27
- Number of Entries: 13,565
- Total Prize Pool: $4,476,450
- Number of Payouts: 2,011
- Winning Hand: A♣ 3♣

Final Table
Place	Name	Prize
1st	(United Kingdom) Paul Hizer (1/1)	$414,490
2nd	(United States) Sam Laskowitz	$256,170
3rd	(United States) Jordan Pelon	$193,240
4th	(United Kingdom) James Scott	$146,680
5th	(United States) Luong Quach	$112,060
6th	(United States) Jeffrey Loiacano	$86,160
7th	(United States) Anthony Ruttler	$66,670
8th	(United States) William Gian	$51,930
9th	(United States) Syed Shah	$40,710

=== Event #52: $2,500 Nine Game Mix ===
- 3-Day Event: June 24–26
- Number of Entries: 456
- Total Prize Pool: $1,014,600
- Number of Payouts: 69
- Winning Hand: K♥ 3♥ (Limit Hold'em)

Final Table
Place	Name	Prize
1st	(United States) Kijoon Park (1/1)	$219,799
2nd	(Brazil) Andre Akkari (0/1)	$135,848
3rd	(United Kingdom) Philip Long (0/1)	$90,411
4th	(United States) David Bach (0/3)	$61,588
5th	(United States) Taylor Paur (0/2)	$42,965
6th	(United States) Michael Chow (0/1)	$30,713

=== Event #53: $5,000 Mixed No-Limit Hold'em/Pot-Limit Omaha ===
- 2-Day Event: June 25–26
- Number of Entries: 788
- Total Prize Pool: $3,634,650
- Number of Payouts: 119
- Winning Hand: A♦ Q♥ Q♠ 2♠ (Pot Limit Omaha)

Final Table
Place	Name	Prize
1st	(Brazil) João Simão (1/2)	$686,242
2nd	(Germany) Marius Gierse	$424,122
3rd	(United States) Ryan Riess (0/1)	$302,980
4th	(Brazil) Dante Goya	$219,472
5th	(United States) Aden Salazar	$161,239
6th	(Germany) Mr Mcswiney	$120,165
7th	(United States) Fred Goldberg (0/1)	$90,864
8th	(United States) Cody Rich	$69,727

=== Event #54: $500 Salute to Warriors No-Limit Hold'em ===
- 3-Day Event: June 26–28
- Number of Entries: 3,209
- Total Prize Pool: $1,444,050
- Number of Payouts: 482
- Winning Hand: A♦ 3♠

Final Table
Place	Name	Prize
1st	(United States) James Todd (1/1)	$161,256
2nd	(United States) Brett Coltman	$99,676
3rd	(United States) Patrick Pilko	$75,486
4th	(United States) Randy Levin	$57,554
5th	(United States) Rigoberto Rodriguez	$44,180
6th	(United States) Nicholas Sena-Hopkins	$34,146
7th	(United States) Todd Saffron	$26,574
8th	(Brazil) Elias Neto	$20,824
9th	(United States) Maximo Martinez	$16,433

=== Event #55: $1,000 Tag Team No-Limit Hold'em ===
- 3-Day Event: June 26–28
- Number of Entries: 913
- Total Prize Pool: $406,285
- Number of Payouts: 137
- Winning Hand: 7♦ 7♥

Final Table
Place	Name	Prize
1st	(Norway) Espen Jørstad (1/1) (United Kingdom) Patrick Leonard (1/1)	$74,042
2nd	(United States) Jamie Kerstetter (United States) Corey Paggeot	$45,756
3rd	(Japan) Taichi Ichikawa (United States) Yutaro Tsugaru	$32,529
4th	(Argentina) Martin Pochat (Argentina) Franco Spitale	$23,452
5th	(United States) Mackenzie Kraemer (United States) Jonathan Schiller	$17,150
6th	(United States) Gabriel Ramos (United States) Zachary Vankeuren	$12,723
7th	(United States) Renato Spahiu (United States) Nicholas Velentzas	$9,578
8th	(United States) Ryan O'Grady (United States) Adam Russell	$7,318
9th	(United States) Christopher Barnes (Canada) Curtis Knight	$5,676

=== Event #56: $50,000 Poker Players Championship ===
- 5-Day Event: June 26–30
- Number of Entries: 112
- Total Prize Pool: $5,362,000
- Number of Payouts: 17
- Winning Hand: J♦ 4♦ (No-Limit Hold'em)

Final Table
Place	Name	Prize
1st	(United States) Daniel Cates (1/2)	$1,449,103
2nd	(Brazil) Yuri Dzivielevski (0/2)	$895,614
3rd	(Japan) Naoya Kihara (0/1)	$639,257
4th	(United Kingdom) Benny Glaser (0/4)	$464,420
5th	(Germany) Johannes Becker (0/1)	$343,531
6th	(Germany) Koray Aldemir (0/1)	$258,812

=== Event #57: $600 Deepstack Championship No-Limit Hold'em ===
- 4-Day Event: June 27–30
- Number of Entries: 4,913
- Total Prize Pool: $2,505,630
- Number of Payouts: 737
- Winning Hand: Q♠ 10♥

Final Table
Place	Name	Prize
1st	(Hungary) Tamas Lendvai (1/1)	$299,464
2nd	(Germany) Frank Reichel	$185,027
3rd	(United States) Jonathan Vanfleet	$138,149
4th	(United States) Alex Jim	$103,934
5th	(United States) Daniel Marcus	$78,793
6th	(United States) Abdullah Alshanti	$60,196
7th	(Israel) Tsuf Saltsberg	$46,347
8th	(Israel) Tamir Saidman	$35,964
9th	(United States) John Ypma	$28,129

=== Event #58: $1,500 Pot-Limit Omaha Hi-Lo 8 or Better ===
- 3-Day Event: June 27–29
- Number of Entries: 1,303
- Total Prize Pool: $1,739,505
- Number of Payouts: 196
- Winning Hand: A♥ K♥ Q♦ 2♠

Final Table
Place	Name	Prize
1st	(United States) Lawrence Brandt (1/1)	$289,610
2nd	(United States) Corey Wade	$179,010
3rd	(United States) Robert Tanita	$129,924
4th	(United States) Richard Crooks	$95,400
5th	(United States) Jared Jaffee (0/1)	$70,877
6th	(United States) Jacob Ferro	$53,288
7th	(United States) Peter Neff	$40,550
8th	(Sweden) Jerry Ödeen (0/1)	$31,234

=== Event #59: $1,000 Super Seniors No-Limit Hold'em ===
- 4-Day Event: June 28-July 1
- Number of Entries: 2,668
- Total Prize Pool: $2,374,520
- Number of Payouts: 401
- Winning Hand: K♣ 5♦

Final Table
Place	Name	Prize
1st	(United States) Massoud Eskandari (1/1)	$330,609
2nd	(United States) Jennifer Gianera	$204,293
3rd	(United States) James Jewell	$151,822
4th	(United States) Sharri Crawford	$113,755
5th	(United States) Peter Mylenki	$85,940
6th	(United States) Bruce Olson	$65,468
7th	(United States) Bruce Vandervort	$50,293
8th	(United Kingdom) Gary Fisher	$38,964
9th	(United States) Marc Walter	$30,446

=== Event #60: $10,000 Short Deck No-Limit Hold'em ===
- 3-Day Event: June 28–30
- Number of Entries: 110
- Total Prize Pool: $1,025,750
- Number of Payouts: 17
- Winning Hand: A♦ K♣

Final Table
Place	Name	Prize
1st	(Japan) Shota Nakanishi (1/1)	$277,212
2nd	(United States) Ben Lamb (0/1)	$171,331
3rd	(United States) Brian Rast (0/5)	$121,718
4th	(United States) Sean Winter	$88,168
5th	(United Kingdom) Stephen Chidwick (0/1)	$65,143
6th	(United States) Scott Smile	$49,113

=== Event #61: $1,000 Ladies No-Limit Hold'em Championship ===
- 4-Day Event: June 29-July 2
- Number of Entries: 1,074
- Total Prize Pool: $955,860
- Number of Payouts: 162
- Winning Hand: A♠ 3♥

Final Table
Place	Name	Prize
1st	(Austria) Jessica Teusl (1/1)	$166,975
2nd	(United States) Julie Le	$103,196
3rd	(United States) Christina Gollins	$73,604
4th	(Germany) Felisa Westermann	$53,213
5th	(United States) Meikat Siu	$39,004
6th	(United States) Lynh Nguyen	$28,989
7th	(United States) Sandy Tran	$21,852
8th	(Germany) Natalie Hof	$16,710
9th	(United States) Cherish Andrews	$12,965

=== Event #62: $1,500 Super Turbo Bounty No-Limit Hold'em ===
- 1-Day Event: June 29
- Number of Entries: 2,569
- Total Prize Pool: $3,429,615
- Number of Payouts: 386
- Winning Hand: K♥ Q♥

Final Table
Place	Name	Prize
1st	(United States) Dash Dudley (1/3)	$301,396
2nd	(United States) David Sanchez	$186,258
3rd	(United States) John Bredengerd	$138,142
4th	(Czech Republic) Jan Bednar	$103,325
5th	(Canada) Harpreet Padda	$77,945
6th	(Japan) Yuhei Sanada	$59,306
7th	(United States) Kevin Davis	$45,517
8th	(United States) Dimitre Dimitrov	$35,240
9th	(United States) Kenneth Drewry	$27,526

=== Event #63: $10,000 Pot-Limit Omaha Hi-Lo 8 or Better Championship ===
- 4-Day Event: June 29-July 2
- Number of Entries: 284
- Total Prize Pool: $2,648,300
- Number of Payouts: 43
- Winning Hand: A♠ K♠ 10♣ 5♥

Final Table
Place	Name	Prize
1st	(Israel) Eli Elezra (1/5)	$611,362
2nd	(United States) Chino Rheem	$377,855
3rd	(United Kingdom) Robert Cowen (1/2)	$271,219
4th	(United States) Damjan Radanov	$197,637
5th	(United States) Ken Aldridge (0/1)	$146,242
6th	(United States) Filippos Stavrakis (0/1)	$109,910
7th	(United States) Josh Arieh (0/4)	$83,920
8th	(United States) Charles Coultas	$65,113

=== Event #64: $600 Pot-Limit Omaha Deepstack ===
- 2-Day Event: June 30-July 1
- Number of Entries: 2,858
- Total Prize Pool: $1,457,580
- Number of Payouts: 429
- Winning Hand: 5♠ 4♠ 3♣ 3♦

Final Table
Place	Name	Prize
1st	(United States) Konstantin Angelov (1/1)	$199,466
2nd	(United States) Gregg Merkow	$123,251
3rd	(United States) Igor Ioffe	$92,200
4th	(France) Guillaume Soumier	$69,501
5th	(Brazil) Vivian Truglio Saliba	$52,795
6th	(France) Philippe Pelluault	$40,417
7th	(United States) Benjamin Miner	$31,184
8th	(Brazil) Rafael Mota	$24,250

=== Event #65: $3,000 Freezeout No-Limit Hold'em ===
- 3-Day Event: June 30-July 2
- Number of Entries: 1,359
- Total Prize Pool: $3,628,530
- Number of Payouts: 204
- Winning Hand: K♣ J♣

Final Table
Place	Name	Prize
1st	(United States) David Jackson (1/2)	$598,173
2nd	(United States) Phil Hellmuth (0/16)	$369,698
3rd	(Hong Kong) Jeffrey Lo	$266,559
4th	(United States) Justin Saliba (0/1)	$194,525
5th	(United States) Timothy Sullivan	$143,699
6th	(Brazil) Renan Bruschi (0/1)	$107,472
7th	(Cyprus) Onur Unsal	$81,390
8th	(United States) Richard Scardina	$62,423
9th	(Sweden) Erik Wigg	$48,494

=== Event #66: $1,000 Mini Main Event No-Limit Hold'em ===
- 3-Day Event: July 1–3
- Number of Entries: 5,832
- Total Prize Pool: $5,190,480
- Number of Payouts: 875
- Winning Hand: K♦ 9♣

Final Table
Place	Name	Prize
1st	(United States) Young Sik Eum (1/1)	$594,189
2nd	(Romania) Cosmin Joldis	$367,233
3rd	(India) Kartik Ved	$275,593
4th	(United States) Phillip Lee	$208,275
5th	(United States) Kei Nitta	$158,515
6th	(United States) Theodore Lee	$121,504
7th	(United States) Adam Velez	$93,803
8th	(United Kingdom) Keith Littlewood	$72,941
9th	(United States) Sergio Ochoa	$57,133

=== Event #67: $10,000 Super Turbo Bounty No-Limit Hold'em ===
- 2-Day Event: July 1–2
- Number of Entries: 419
- Total Prize Pool: $3,907,175
- Number of Payouts: 63
- Winning Hand: K♣ Q♣

Final Table
Place	Name	Prize
1st	(Argentina) Nacho Barbero (1/1)	$587,520
2nd	(Brazil) Fabiano Kovalski	$363,116
3rd	(Russia) Ilya Nikiforov	$254,791
4th	(Netherlands) Rob Hollink (0/1)	$181,667
5th	(United States) Maria Ho	$131,655
6th	(United States) Andrew Lichtenberger (0/1)	$97,002
7th	(Germany) Rainer Kempe	$72,683
8th	(Azerbaijan) David Mzareulov	$55,401
9th	(United States) Paul Chauderson	$42,970

=== Event #68: $1,000 Million Dollar Bounty No-Limit Hold'em ===
- 5-Day Event: July 2–6
- Number of Entries: 14,112
- Total Prize Pool: $8,326,080
- Number of Payouts: 2,000
- Winning Hand: A♥ Q♣

Final Table
Place	Name	Prize
1st	(United States) Quincy Borland (1/1)	$750,120
2nd	(United States) Kevin Hong	$463,610
3rd	(United States) David Timmons	$351,800
4th	(Germany) Wojciech Barzantny	$268,550
5th	(Canada) Michael Smith	$206,250
6th	(United States) Nellie Park	$159,380
7th	(United States) Arash Asadabadi	$123,910
8th	(Brazil) Daniel De Almeida	$96,940
9th	(Brazil) Ramon Kropmanns	$76,316

=== Event #69: $10,000 Pot-Limit Omaha 8-Handed Championship ===
- 4-Day Event: July 2–5
- Number of Entries: 683
- Total Prize Pool: $6,368,975
- Number of Payouts: 103
- Winning Hand: A♠ Q♦ J♣ 10♦

Final Table
Place	Name	Prize
1st	(United States) Sean Troha (1/1)	$1,246,770
2nd	(United States) Shiva Dudani	$770,556
3rd	(Argentina) Michael Duek	$548,015
4th	(United States) Tom Hu	$395,465
5th	(Norway) Joachim Haraldstad	$289,630
6th	(United States) Thair Kallabat	$215,326
7th	(United States) Nitesh Rawtani	$162,542
8th	(United Kingdom) Toby Lewis	$124,611

=== Event #70: $10,000 No-Limit Hold'em Main Event ===
- 14-Day Event: July 3–16
- Number of Entries: 8,663
- Total Prize Pool: $80,782,475
- Number of Payouts: 1,300
- Winning Hand: Q♦ 2♠

Final Table
Place	Name	Prize
1st	(Norway) Espen Jørstad (2/2)	$10,000,000
2nd	(Australia) Adrian Attenborough	$6,000,000
3rd	(Argentina) Michael Duek	$4,000,000
4th	(United Kingdom) John Eames	$3,000,000
5th	(Croatia) Matija Dobric	$2,250,000
6th	(United States) Jeffrey Farnes	$1,750,000
7th	(Canada) Aaron Duczak	$1,350,000
8th	(United Kingdom) Philippe Souki	$1,075,000
9th	(United States) Matthew Su	$850,675

=== Event #71: $1,111 One More for One Drop No-Limit Hold'em ===
- 5-Day Event: July 7–11
- Number of Entries: 5,702
- Total Prize Pool: $5,707,702
- Number of Payouts: 856
- Winning Hand: 6♠ 3♥

Final Table
Place	Name	Prize
1st	(United States) Mike Allis (1/1)	$535,610
2nd	(United States) Ryan Riess (0/1)	$331,056
3rd	(United States) Basel Chaura	$250,157
4th	(United States) Mohammed Jafaar	$190,363
5th	(Brazil) Leonardo de Souza	$145,892
6th	(United States) Salah Nimer	$112,612
7th	(United States) Andrew Robinson	$87,551
8th	(United States) Rio Fujita	$68,562
9th	(United States) Niklas Warlich	$54,085

=== Event #72: $1,500 Mixed Omaha ===
- 3-Day Event: July 7–9
- Number of Entries: 771
- Total Prize Pool: $1,029,285
- Number of Payouts: 116
- Winning Hand: 7♠ 6♠ 4♦ 3♠ 2♦ (Big O)

Final Table
Place	Name	Prize
1st	(United States) Bradley Anderson (1/1)	$195,565
2nd	(United States) Scott Abrams	$120,881
3rd	(United Kingdom) Barny Boatman (0/2)	$83,050
4th	(United States) Peter Neff	$58,089
5th	(United States) Men Nguyen (0/7)	$41,377
6th	(United States) Mark Erickson	$30,026
7th	(United States) Jarod Minghini	$22,205

=== Event #73: $1,500 Razz ===
- 3-Day Event: July 8–10
- Number of Entries: 383
- Total Prize Pool: $511,305
- Number of Payouts: 58
- Winning Hand: Qx 8♦ 7♠ 4♦ 3♠ 3x 2♠

Final Table
Place	Name	Prize
1st	(United States) Daniel Strelitz (1/2)	$115,723
2nd	(United States) Lynda Tran	$71,527
3rd	(United States) Calvin Anderson (0/2)	$49,557
4th	(United States) Frank Kassela (0/3)	$34,996
5th	(Brazil) Sergio Braga	$25,198
6th	(United States) Kijoon Park (1/1)	$18,506
7th	(United States) Mark Gerencher	$13,869
8th	(Argentina) Andres Korn (0/1)	$10,611

=== Event #74: $1,500 Bounty Pot-Limit Omaha 8-Handed ===
- 3-Day Event: July 9–11
- Number of Entries: 1,390
- Total Prize Pool: $1,855,650
- Number of Payouts: 209
- Winning Hand: K♠ Q♥ 10♠ 9♦

Final Table
Place	Name	Prize
1st	(Canada) Pei Li (1/1)	$190,219
2nd	(United States) Nolan King	$117,545
3rd	(United States) Raul Esquivel	$85,739
4th	(Finland) Eemil Tuominen	$63,231
5th	(United States) William Gross	$47,153
6th	(Belgium) Eric Lescot	$35,561
7th	(United States) Ryan Scully	$27,125
8th	(Bulgaria) Kostantin Angelov (1/1)	$20,930

=== Event #75: $777 Lucky 7's No-Limit Hold'em ===
- 5-Day Event: July 10–14
- Number of Entries: 6,891
- Total Prize Pool: $4,711,790
- Number of Payouts: 989
- Winning Hand: A♥ 10♦

Final Table
Place	Name	Prize
1st	(France) Gregory Teboul (1/1)	$777,777
2nd	(United States) Rodney Turvin	$400,777
3rd	(United States) Christopher Farmer	$207,777
4th	(United States) James Hughes	$154,777
5th	(United States) Jed Stewart	$116,777
6th	(United States) Kyle Miholich	$87,777
7th	(United States) Allen Cunningham (0/5)	$66,777

=== Event #76: $1,979 Poker Hall of Fame Bounty No-Limit Hold'em ===
- 2-Day Event: July 10–11
- Number of Entries: 865
- Total Prize Pool: $1,495,363
- Number of Payouts: 130
- Winning Hand: A♠ 4♣

Final Table
Place	Name	Prize
1st	(South Korea) Hong Jin-ho (1/1)	$276,067
2nd	(Thailand) Punnat Punsri	$170,615
3rd	(Germany) Jakob Miegel	$120,756
4th	(United States) Daniel Weinman (1/1)	$86,730
5th	(Latvia) Pavel Spirins	$63,225
6th	(Brazil) Yuri Dzivielevski (0/2)	$46,791
7th	(Marshall Islands) George Rotariu	$35,164
8th	(Malta) Bas de Laat	$26,841
9th	(Canada) Dov Markowich	$20,814

=== Event #77: $1,500 Mixed No-Limit Hold'em/Pot-Limit Omaha ===
- 3-Day Event: July 11–13
- Number of Entries: 1,234
- Total Prize Pool: $1,647,390
- Number of Payouts: 186
- Winning Hand: 9♣ 9♦ (No-Limit Hold'em)

Final Table
Place	Name	Prize
1st	(United States) Sandeep Pulusani (1/2)	$277,949
2nd	(United States) Esther Taylor-Brady	$171,787
3rd	(United States) Aden Salazar	$124,865
4th	(Canada) Vincent Lam	$91,800
5th	(United Kingdom) Richard Kellett	$68,274
6th	(United States) Noah Bronstein	$51,372
7th	(Norway) Vegard Andreassen	$39,114
8th	(United States) William Leffingwell	$30,139

=== Event #78: $2,500 No-Limit Hold'em ===
- 3-Day Event: July 11–13
- Number of Entries: 1,364
- Total Prize Pool: $3,034,900
- Number of Payouts: 205
- Winning Hand: 9♠ 7♥

Final Table
Place	Name	Prize
1st	(Canada) Sebastien Aube (1/1)	$499,636
2nd	(France) Julien Loire	$308,817
3rd	(United States) Brian Etheridge	$222,762
4th	(United States) Axel Hallay	$162,627
5th	(United States) Leandro Vlastaris	$120,177
6th	(Canada) Santiago Plante	$89,905
7th	(United States) Matt Berkey	$68,102
8th	(Israel) Ran Koller (0/1)	$52,240
9th	(United States) Jonathan Zarin	$40,588

=== Event #79: $10,000 Razz Championship ===
- 3-Day Event: July 12–14
- Number of Entries: 125
- Total Prize Pool: $1,165,625
- Number of Payouts: 21
- Winning Hand: K♣ 9♥ 7♣ 7♠ 4♠ 3♣ A♦

Final Table
Place	Name	Prize
1st	(France) Julien Martini (1/4)	$328,906
2nd	(United States) Hal Rotholz	$203,281
3rd	(China) Yueqi Zhu (0/1)	$149,958
4th	(Germany) Koray Aldemir (0/1)	$111,991
5th	(Brazil) Felipe Ramos	$84,683
6th	(Italy) Max Pescatori (0/4)	$64,847
7th	(United States) Brian Hastings (1/6)	$50,295
8th	(United States) Brandon Shack-Harris (0/2)	$39,516

=== Event #80: $600 Mixed No-Limit Hold'em/Pot-Limit Omaha Deepstack ===
- 2-Day Event: July 13–14
- Number of Entries: 2,107
- Total Prize Pool: $1,074,570
- Number of Payouts: 317
- Winning Hand: Q♦ 10♣ (No-Limit Hold'em)

Final Table
Place	Name	Prize
1st	(Latvia) Romans Voitovs (1/1)	$158,609
2nd	(United States) Michael Dobbs	$98,026
3rd	(United States) Justin Barnum	$72,544
4th	(Brazil) Francisco Baruffi	$54,172
5th	(United States) Richard Bai	$40,822
6th	(United States) Jordan Russell	$31,046
7th	(United States) Jacob Staley	$23,831
8th	(United States) Andrew Peplinski	$18,464

=== Event #81: $5,000 Freezeout No-Limit Hold'em 8-Handed ===
- 3-Day Event: July 13–15
- Number of Entries: 756
- Total Prize Pool: $3,487,050
- Number of Payouts: 114
- Winning Hand: K♥ 10♠

Final Table
Place	Name	Prize
1st	(United States) Mo Arani (1/1)	$665,459
2nd	(Netherlands) Johannes Straver	$411,279
3rd	(Hungary) Peter Turmezey	$292,665
4th	(United States) Adam Hendrix	$211,295
5th	(United Kingdom) Toby Lewis	$154,806
6th	(France) Francois Pirault	$115,122
7th	(United States) Cliff Josephy (0/2)	$86,917
8th	(United States) Michael Katz	$66,638

=== Event #82: $800 No-Limit Hold'em 8-Handed Deepstack ===
- 2-Day Event: July 14–15
- Number of Entries: 2,812
- Total Prize Pool: $1,979,648
- Number of Payouts: 422
- Winning Hand: K♠ J♣

Final Table
Place	Name	Prize
1st	(United States) Richard Alsup (1/1)	$272,065
2nd	(United States) Gary Whitehead	$168,093
3rd	(Canada) Ari Engel (0/2)	$126,233
4th	(United States) Ryan Jaworski	$95,487
5th	(Republic of Ireland) Marc Macdonnell	$72,759
6th	(Ukraine) Artem Metalidi	$55,849
7th	(United States) Patrick Truong	$43,188
8th	(United States) Frederick Brown	$33,648

=== Event #83: $50,000 High Roller No-Limit Hold'em ===
- 3-Day Event: July 14–16
- Number of Entries: 97
- Total Prize Pool: $4,643,875
- Number of Payouts: 17
- Winning Hand: A♦ A♥

Final Table
Place	Name	Prize
1st	(Portugal) João Vieira (1/2)	$1,384,413
2nd	(Spain) Lander Lijo	$855,631
3rd	(United States) Galen Hall (0/1)	$625,941
4th	(United States) Dan Colpoys	$463,589
5th	(United States) Brian Rast (0/5)	$347,658
6th	(United States) Sean Perry	$264,034
7th	(Germany) Fedor Holz (0/2)	$203,107
8th	(United Kingdom) Stephen Chidwick (0/1)	$158,278
9th	(Greece) Alexandros Theologis (0/1)	$124,974

=== Event #84: $3,000 H.O.R.S.E. ===
- 3-Day Event: July 14–16
- Number of Entries: 327
- Total Prize Pool: $873,090
- Number of Payouts: 50
- Winning Hand: K♥ Q♥ J♣ 9♣ 9♦ 9♥ 9♠ (Seven Card Stud Hi-Lo 8 or Better)

Final Table
Place	Name	Prize
1st	(United States) Lawrence Brandt (2/2)	$205,319
2nd	(United States) Roberto Marin	$126,895
3rd	(Poland) Tomasz Gluszko	$87,687
4th	(United States) Richard Tatalovich	$61,789
5th	(United States) Kevin Gerhart (0/4)	$44,415
6th	(United States) Kristan Lord	$32,583
7th	(United States) Perry Friedman (0/1)	$24,403
8th	(United States) Yarron Bendor	$18,669

=== Event #85: $1,500 The Closer No-Limit Hold'em ===
- 3-Day Event: July 15–17
- Number of Entries: 2,968
- Total Prize Pool: $3,962,280
- Number of Payouts: 437
- Winning Hand: 7♣ 6♥

Final Table
Place	Name	Prize
1st	(United States) Minh Nguyen (1/1)	$536,280
2nd	(South Africa) Ahmed Karrim	$331,470
3rd	(United States) Michael Liang	$247,890
4th	(United States) Madelyn Carr	$186,770
5th	(United States) Manuel Herreragarcia	$141,770
6th	(United States) Daniel Tabello	$108,420
7th	(United States) Samuel Brown	$83,540
8th	(United States) Rudy Cervantes	$64,870
9th	(United States) Zachary Johnson	$50,759

=== Event #86: $10,000 No-Limit Hold'em 6-Handed Championship ===
- 3-Day Event: July 15–17
- Number of Entries: 394
- Total Prize Pool: $3,674,050
- Number of Payouts: 60
- Winning Hand: A♠ 9♠

Final Table
Place	Name	Prize
1st	(United States) Gregory Jensen (1/1)	$824,649
2nd	(Czech Republic) Pavel Plesuv	$509,674
3rd	(United States) Lucas Foster	$341,902
4th	(United States) Ali Eslami (1/1)	$234,396
5th	(Israel) Barak Wisbrod (0/1)	$164,304
6th	(United States) Brock Wilson	$117,819

=== Event #87: $5,000 No-Limit Hold'em 8-Handed ===
- 2-Day Event: July 16–17
- Number of Entries: 573
- Total Prize Pool: $2,642,963
- Number of Payouts: 86
- Winning Hand: 6♠ 3♦

Final Table
Place	Name	Prize
1st	(United States) Michael Wang (1/2)	$541,604
2nd	(Colombia) Farid Jattin	$334,747
3rd	(United States) Erik Seidel (0/9)	$238,321
4th	(India) Kartik Ved (0/1)	$172,103
5th	(Israel) Yuval Bronshtein (0/2)	$126,089
6th	(United States) Billy O'Neil	$83,740
7th	(United States) Fred Goldberg (0/1)	$70,734
8th	(United States) Will Nguyen	$54,185

=== Event #88: $1,000 Super Turbo No-Limit Hold'em ===
- 1-Day Event: July 17
- Number of Entries: 1,282
- Total Prize Pool: $1,140,980
- Number of Payouts: 193
- Winning Hand: Q♦ Q♥

Final Table
Place	Name	Prize
1st	(Canada) Jaspal Brar (1/1)	$190,731
2nd	(United States) Jesse Lonis	$117,872
3rd	(United States) Jesse Capps	$85,040
4th	(Bulgaria) Boris Kolev (0/1)	$62,090
5th	(United States) Christopher Garman	$45,885
6th	(United States) Ronald Sullivan	$34,327
7th	(Brazil) Vinicius Escossi	$26,000
8th	(United States) Huy Nguyen	$19,942
9th	(United States) Jonathan Hilton (0/1)	$15,491

=== Event #89: Tournament of Champions ===
- 3-Day Event: July 18–20
- Number of Entries: 470
- Total Prize Pool: $1,000,000
- Number of Payouts: 60
- Winning Hand: A♣ 6♣

Final Table
Place	Name	Prize
1st	(United States) Benjamin Kaupp (1/1)	$250,000
2nd	(United States) Raul Garza	$150,000
3rd	(United States) Ryan Messick (1/1)	$100,000
4th	(United Kingdom) Robert Cowen (1/2)	$75,000
5th	(United States) Ali Eslami (1/1)	$50,000
6th	(United States) Gregory Wish	$37,500
7th	(Bulgaria) Yuliyan Kolev (1/2)	$27,500
8th	(France) Eric Bensimhon	$20,000
9th	(Italy) Gianluca Speranza (1/1)	$15,000
