= 2022 World Series of Poker =

Series of poker tournaments

- Location: Bally's Las Vegas and Paris Las Vegas, Las Vegas, Nevada
- Dates: May 31 – July 20

Champion
- (Norway) Espen Jørstad

The 2022 World Series of Poker (WSOP) was the 53rd edition of the event and run from May 31 – July 20. After being held at the Rio All-Suite Hotel and Casino since 2005, the event moved to Bally's Las Vegas and Paris Las Vegas for the first time.

There were 88 bracelet events on the schedule, including the $10,000 No-Limit Hold'em Main Event beginning on July 3. The series culminated with the Tournament of Champions, a freeroll with a $1 million prize pool open to the year's bracelet and circuit ring winners.

== Event schedule ==
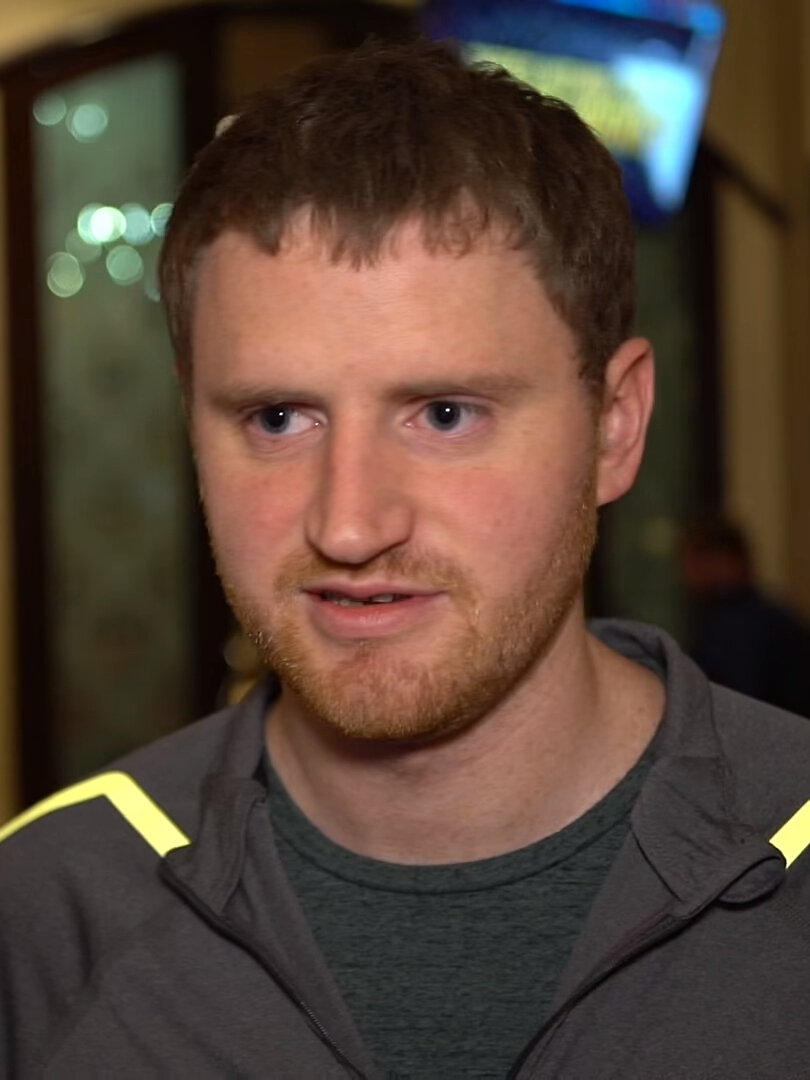
David Peters won his fourth bracelet in Event #2

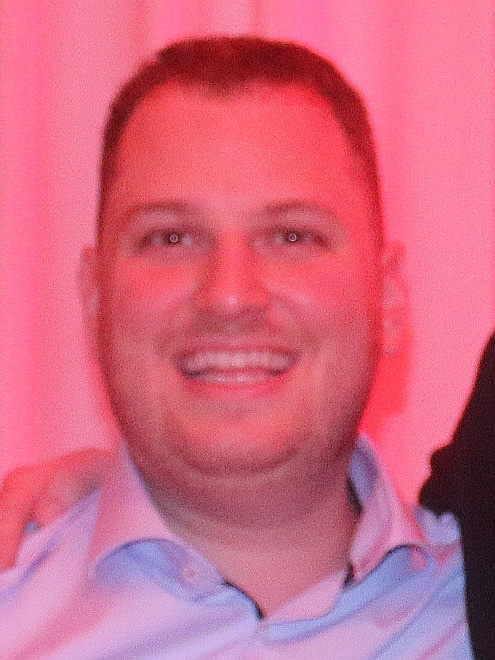
Scott Seiver won his fourth bracelet in Event #3

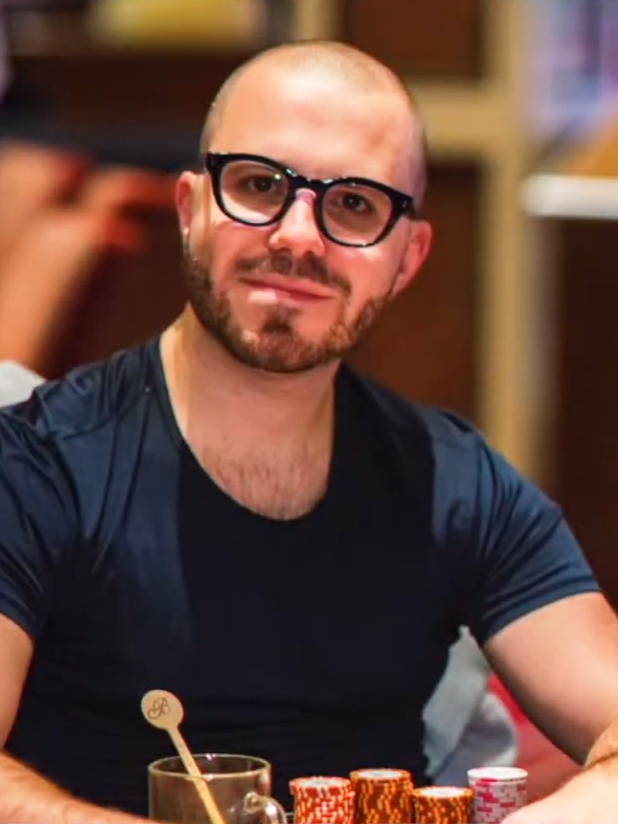
Dan Smith won his first bracelet in Event #6

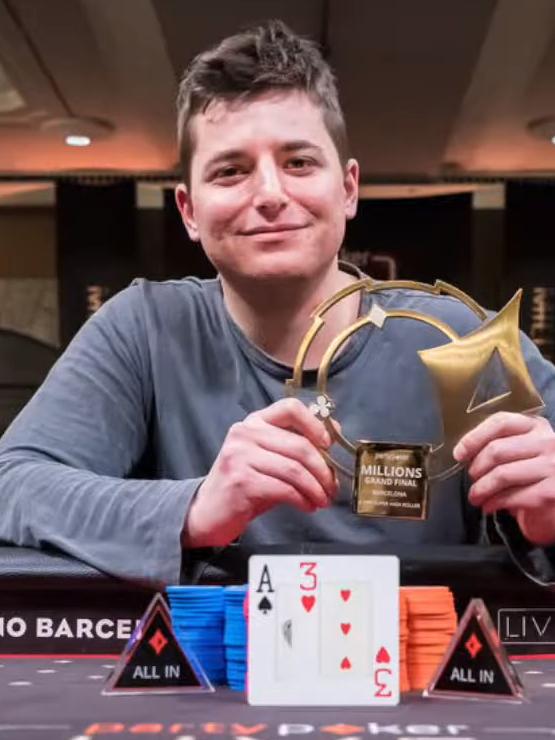
Jake Schindler won his first bracelet in Event #12

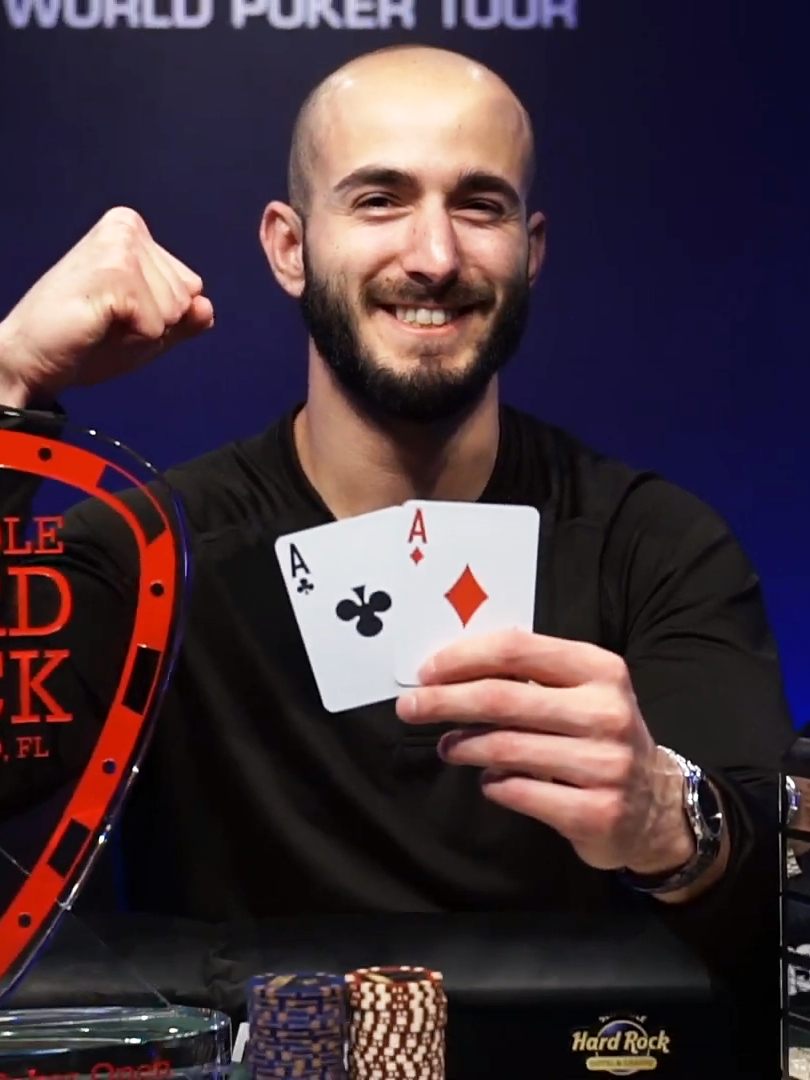
Brian Altman won his first bracelet in Online Event #3

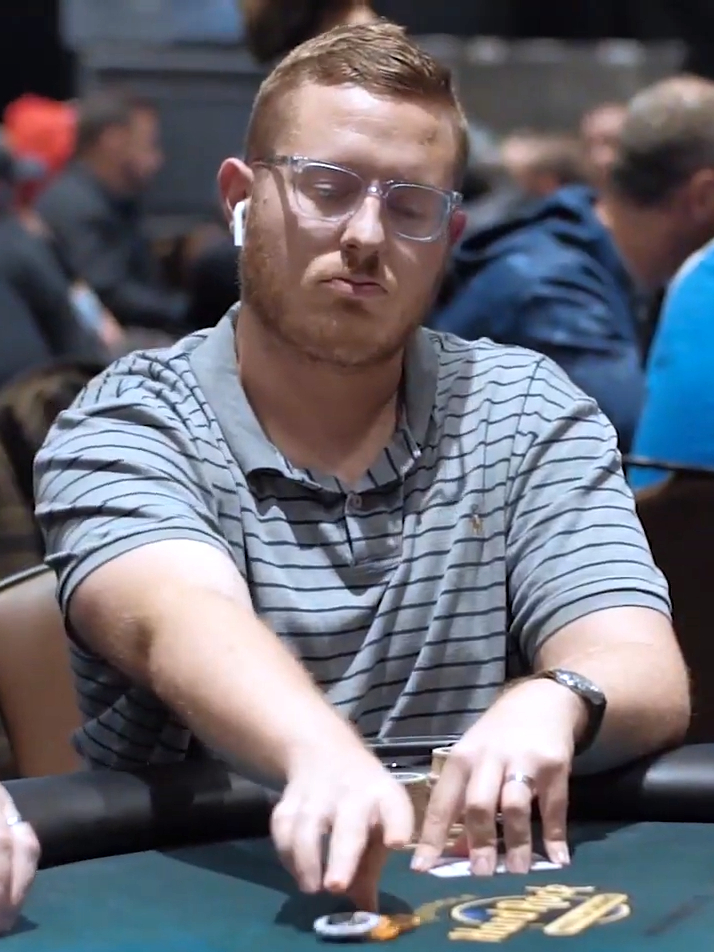
Brian Hastings won his sixth bracelet in Event #31

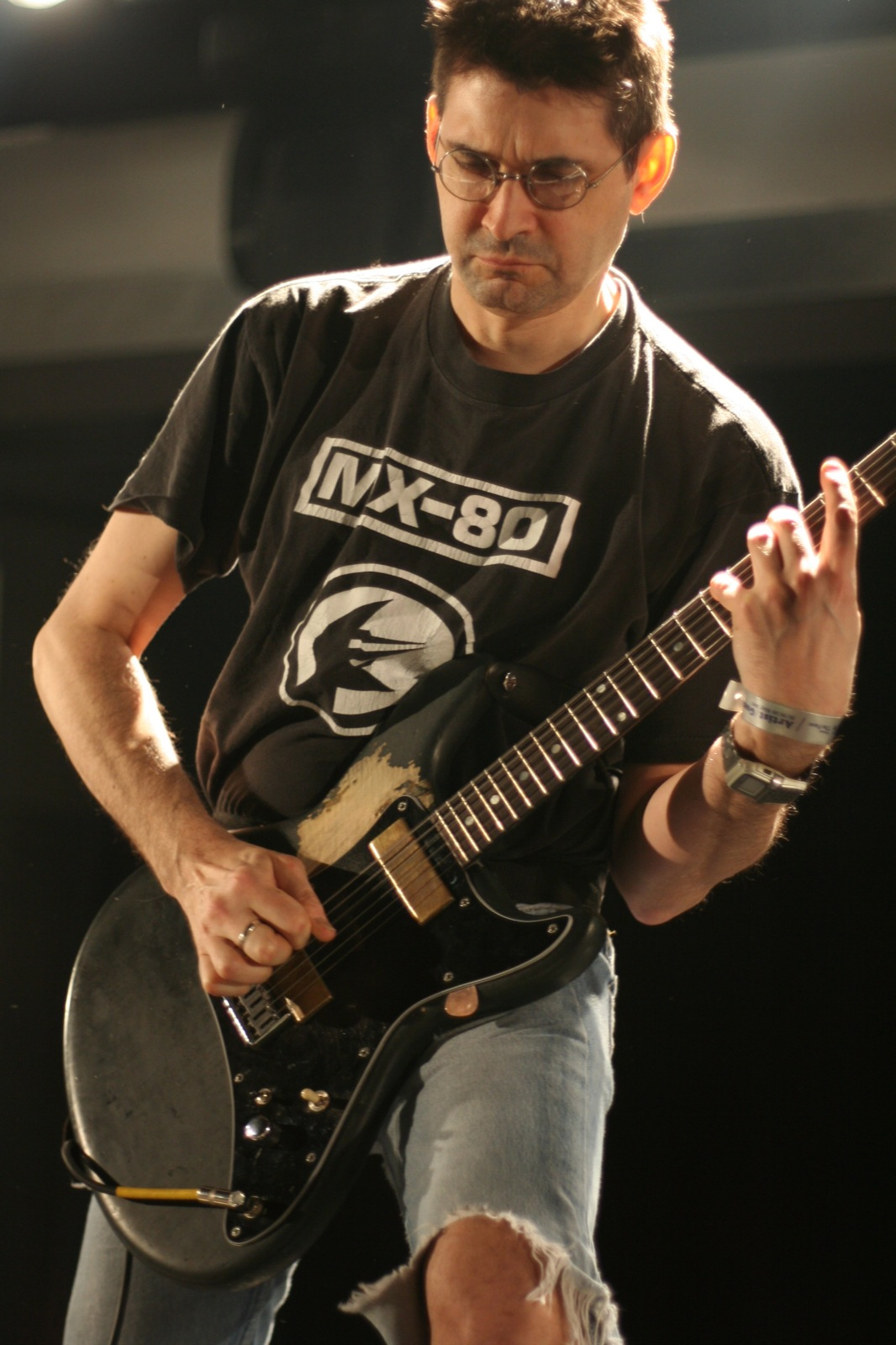
Steve Albini won his second bracelet in Event #32

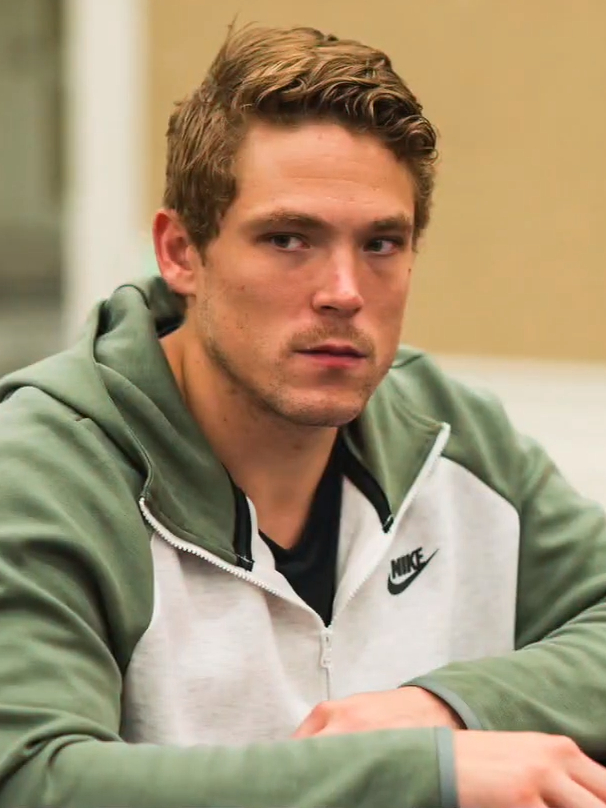
Alex Foxen won his first bracelet in Event #50

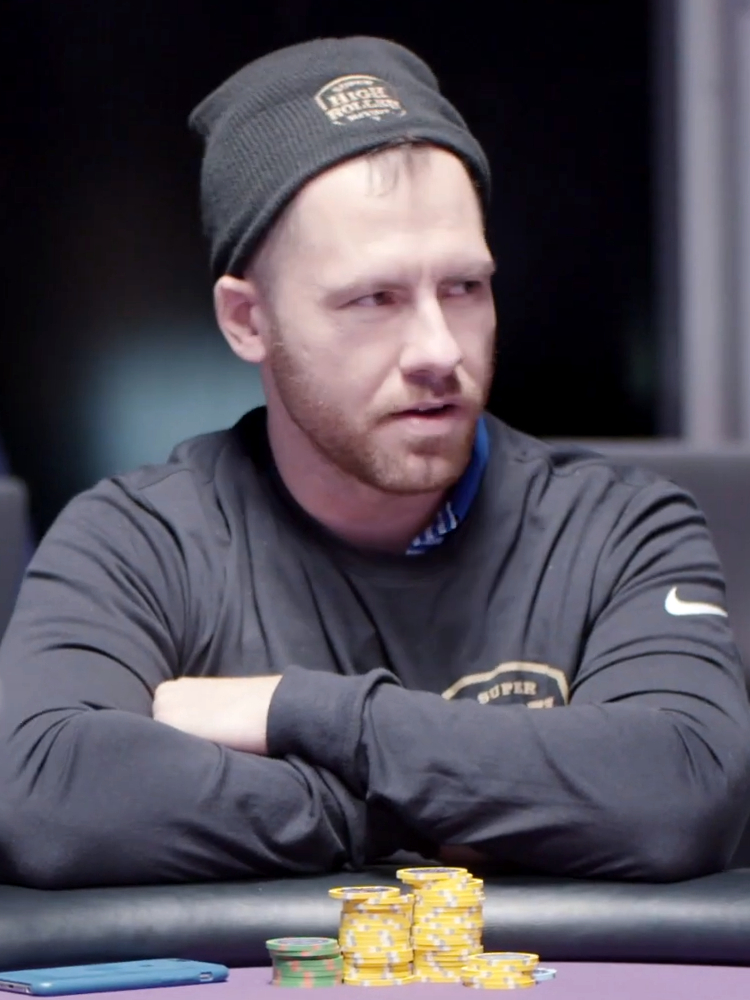
Daniel Cates won his second bracelet in Event #56

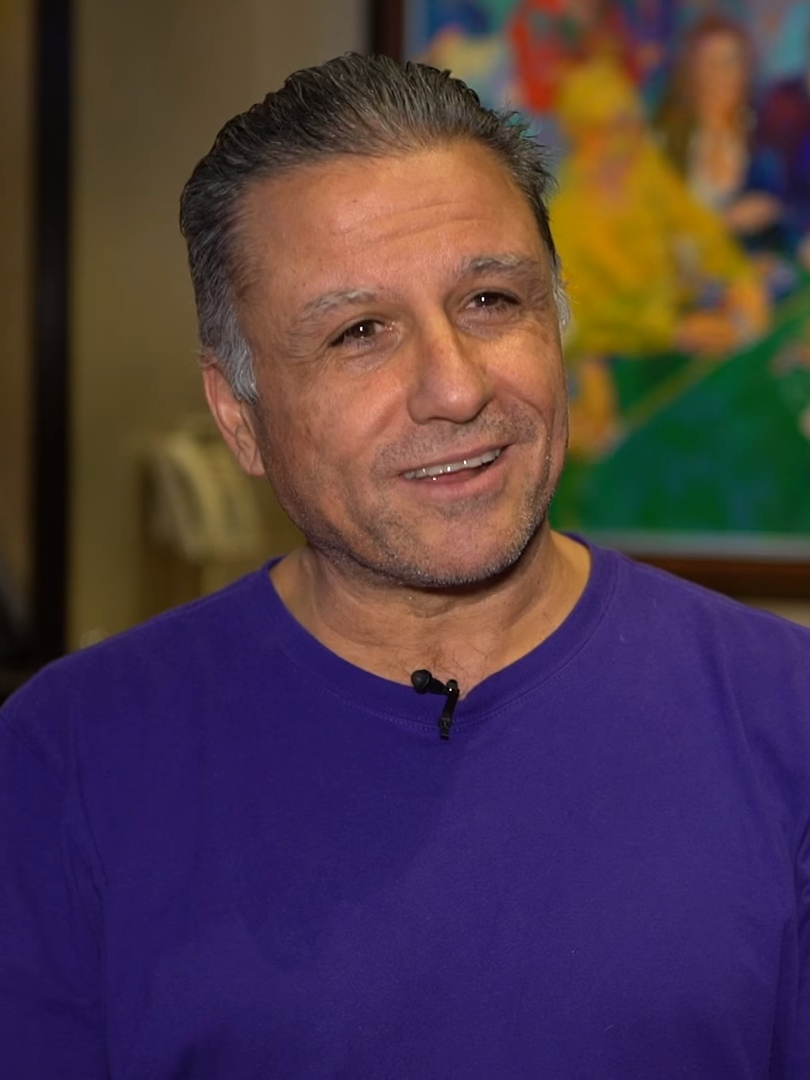
Eli Elezra won his fifth bracelet in Event #63

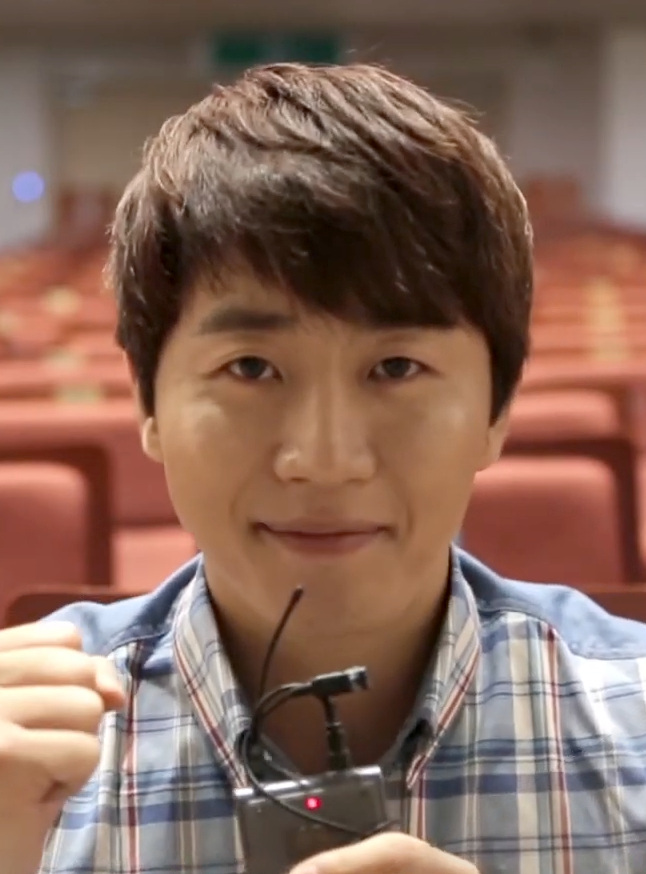
Hong Jin-ho won his first bracelet in Event #76

Key: (bracelets won in 2022/bracelets won in career)

High stakes event ($10,000+ buy-in).
No points awarded towards Player of the Year.
Online event.

#	Event	Entrants	Winner	Prize	Runner-up	Results
1	$500 Casino Employees No-Limit Hold'em	832	(United States) Kate Kopp (1/1)	$65,168	(United States) Wyatt Frost	Results
2	$100,000 High Roller Bounty No-Limit Hold'em	46	(United States) David Peters (1/4)	$1,166,810	(United States) Chance Kornuth (0/3)	Results
3	$2,500 Freezeout No-Limit Hold'em	752	(United States) Scott Seiver (1/4)	$320,059	(United States) Alexander Farahi	Results
4	$1,500 Dealers Choice 6-Handed	430	(United States) Brad Ruben (1/4)	$126,288	(Canada) Jaswinder Lally (0/1)	Results
5	$500 The Housewarming No-Limit Hold'em	20,080	(United States) Henrieto Acain (1/1)	$701,215	(United States) Jared Kingery	Results
6	$25,000 Heads Up No-Limit Hold'em Championship	64	(United States) Dan Smith (1/1)	$509,717	(Germany) Christoph Vogelsang	Results
7	$1,500 Omaha Hi-Lo 8 or Better	1,086	(United States) Amnon Filippi (1/1)	$252,718	(United States) Matt Vengrin	Results
8	$25,000 High Roller No-Limit Hold'em	251	(United States) Chad Eveslage (1/1)	$1,415,610	(United States) Jake Schindler	Results
9	$1,500 Seven Card Stud	329	(Canada) Alex Livingston (1/1)	$103,282	(United States) Daniel Weinman	Results
10	$10,000 Dealers Choice 6-Handed Championship	123	(United States) Ben Diebold (1/1)	$299,488	(Russia) Mike Gorodinsky (0/2)	Results
o1	$5,300 No-Limit Hold'em High Roller Freezeout	218	(Hungary) Norbert Szecsi (1/3)	$288,850	(United States) Tony Dunst (0/2)	
o2	$500 No-Limit Hold'em Big $500	1,213	(Germany) Manig Löser (1/2)	$127,153	(United States) Brian Battistone	
11	$600 No-Limit Hold'em Deepstack	5,715	(United States) Raj Vohra (1/1)	$335,286	(United States) Qing Liu	Results
12	$50,000 High Roller No-Limit Hold'em	101	(United States) Jake Schindler (1/1)	$1,328,068	(United States) Brek Schutten	Results
13	$1,500 Limit Hold'em	522	(United States) Michael Moncek (1/1)	$145,856	(United States) Ben Ross	Results
14	$1,500 No-Limit Hold'em 6-Handed	2,392	(France) Leo Soma (1/1)	$456,889	(United States) Thomas Schultz	Results
15	$10,000 Omaha Hi-Lo 8 or Better Championship	196	(United States) Daniel Zack (1/2)	$440,757	(United States) Dustin Dirksen	Results
16	$3,000 No-Limit Hold'em	1,240	(Austria) Stefan Lehner (1/1)	$558,616	(United States) Toby Boas	Results
17	$2,500 Mixed Triple Draw Lowball	309	(United States) Dominick Sarle (1/1)	$164,243	(United States) Jerry Wong	Results
18	$1,000 Freezeout No-Limit Hold'em	2,663	(United States) Bryan Schultz (1/1)	$330,057	(United States) Young Sik Eum	Results
19	$25,000 High Roller Pot-Limit Omaha	264	(China) Tong Li (1/1)	$1,467,739	(Germany) Fabian Brandes	Results
20	$1,500 Limit 2-7 Lowball Triple Draw	350	(Russia) Denis Nesterenko (1/1)	$108,250	(United States) Von Altizer	Results
21	$1,500 Monster Stack No-Limit Hold'em	6,501	(United States) Mike Jukich (1/1)	$966,577	(Germany) Mateusz Moolhuizen	Results
22	$10,000 Seven Card Stud Championship	95	(United States) Adam Friedman (1/5)	$248,254	(United States) Jean Gaspard (0/1)	Results
23	$3,000 Limit Hold'em 6-Handed	213	(United States) Jeremy Ausmus (1/4)	$142,147	(United States) Michael Rocco (0/1)	Results
24	$1,000 FLIP & GO No-Limit Hold'em	1,329	(United States) Christopher Chatman (1/1)	$187,770	(Israel) Rafi Elharar	Results
25	$800 No-Limit Hold'em Deepstack	4,062	(United States) Rajaee Wazwaz (1/1)	$358,346	(United States) Robert Crow	Results
26	$10,000 Limit Hold'em Championship	92	(Canada) Jonathan Cohen (1/1)	$245,678	(United States) Kyle Dilschneider	Results
o3	$400 No-Limit Hold'em Ultra Deepstack	1,641	(United States) Brian Altman (1/1)	$110,662	(United States) Eric Salazar	
27	$1,500 Shootout No-Limit Hold'em	1,000	(United States) Michael Simhai (1/1)	$240,480	(United States) David Dowdy	Results
28	$50,000 High Roller Pot-Limit Omaha	106	(United Kingdom) Robert Cowen (1/2)	$1,393,816	(United States) Dash Dudley (0/2)	Results
29	$1,500 No-Limit 2-7 Lowball Draw	437	(United States) Maxx Coleman (1/1)	$127,809	(United States) Thomas Newton	Results
30	$1,000 Pot-Limit Omaha 8-Handed	1,891	(United States) Daniel Weinman (1/1)	$255,359	(United States) Jamey Hendrikson	Results
31	$10,000 Limit 2-7 Lowball Triple Draw Championship	118	(United States) Brian Hastings (1/6)	$292,146	(United States) Eric Wasserson	Results
32	$1,500 H.O.R.S.E.	773	(United States) Steve Albini (1/2)	$196,089	(Canada) James Morgan	Results
33	$3,000 No-Limit Hold'em 6-Handed	1,348	(Germany) Nino Ullmann (1/1)	$594,079	(United States) Timothy Flank	Results
34	$1,500 Freezeout No-Limit Hold'em	1,774	(United States) Justin Pechie (1/2)	$364,899	(France) Samuel Bifarella	Results
35	$2,500 Mixed Big Bet Event	281	(Hong Kong) Lok Chan (1/1)	$144,338	(Canada) Drew Scott	Results
36	$1,500 Seven Card Stud Hi-Lo 8 or Better	471	(United States) Ali Eslami (1/1)	$135,260	(United States) Chris Papastratis	Results
37	$1,500 Millionaire Maker No-Limit Hold'em	7,961	(Bulgaria) Yuliyan Kolev (1/2)	$1,125,189	(Israel) Oren Rosen	Results
38	$10,000 No-Limit 2-7 Lowball Draw Championship	121	(Brazil) Pedro Bromfman (1/1)	$294,616	(United States) Scott Seiver (1/4)	Results
39	$3,000 Pot-Limit Omaha 6-Handed	719	(Germany) Fabian Brandes (1/1)	$371,358	(Israel) Leonid Yanovski	Results
40	$10,000 Seven Card Stud Hi-Lo 8 or Better Championship	137	(United States) Daniel Zack (2/3)	$324,174	(United States) David Funkhouser	Results
41	$1,000 Super Turbo Bounty No-Limit Hold'em	2,227	(United States) Ramsey Stovall (1/1)	$191,223	(United States) Timothy Heng	Results
42	$100,000 High Roller No-Limit Hold'em	62	(Latvia) Aleksejs Ponakovs (1/2)	$1,897,363	(United States) Phil Ivey (0/10)	Results
o4	$1,000 Pot-Limit Omaha 6-Max	470	(United States) Matt Szymaszek (1/1)	$141,705	(United States) Greg Koutelidakis	
43	$500 Freezeout No-Limit Hold'em	4,786	(United States) David Perry (1/1)	$241,729	(United Kingdom) Chris Moorman (0/2)	Results
44	$10,000 H.O.R.S.E. Championship	192	(United States) Andrew Yeh (1/1)	$487,129	(United States) Craig Chait	Results
45	$1,500 Pot-Limit Omaha	1,437	(United States) Phil Hui (1/3)	$311,782	(France) Daniel Tordjman	Results
46	$5,000 No-Limit Hold'em 6-Handed	920	(France) Jonathan Pastore (1/1)	$771,765	(United States) Stephen Song (0/1)	Results
47	$1,000 Seniors No-Limit Hold'em Championship	7,188	(United States) Eric Smidinger (1/1)	$694,909	(United States) Ben Sarnoff	Results
48	$1,500 Eight Game Mix 6-Handed	695	(Cyprus) Menikos Panagiotou (1/1)	$180,783	(United States) Nick Yunis	Results
49	$2,000 No-Limit Hold'em	1,977	(Bulgaria) Simeon Spasov (1/1)	$527,944	(Canada) Mike Watson	Results
50	$250,000 Super High Roller No-Limit Hold'em	56	(United States) Alex Foxen (1/1)	$4,563,700	(United States) Brandon Steven	Results
51	$400 Colossus No-Limit Hold'em	13,565	(United Kingdom) Paul Hizer (1/1)	$414,490	(United States) Sam Laskowitz	Results
52	$2,500 Nine Game Mix 6-Handed	456	(United States) Kijoon Park (1/1)	$219,799	(Brazil) André Akkari (0/1)	Results
53	$5,000 Mixed No-Limit Hold'em/Pot-Limit Omaha	788	(Brazil) João Simão (1/2)	$686,242	(Germany) Marius Gierse	Results
54	$500 Salute to Warriors No-Limit Hold'em	3,209	(United States) James Todd (1/1)	$161,256	(United States) Brett Coltman	Results
55	$1,000 Tag Team No-Limit Hold'em	913	(Norway) Espen Jørstad (1/1) (United Kingdom) Patrick Leonard (1/1)	$74,042	(United States) Jamie Kerstetter (United States) Corey Paggeot	Results
56	$50,000 Poker Players Championship	112	(United States) Daniel Cates (1/2)	$1,449,103	(Brazil) Yuri Dzivielevski (0/2)	Results
o5	$600 Online Deepstack Championship	1,248	(United States) William Corvino (1/1)	$149,319	(Moldova) Pavel Plesuv	
57	$600 Deepstack Championship No-Limit Hold'em	4,913	(Hungary) Tamas Lendvai (1/1)	$299,464	(Germany) Frank Reichel	Results
58	$1,500 Pot-Limit Omaha Hi-Lo 8 or Better	1,303	(United States) Lawrence Brandt (1/1)	$289,610	(United States) Corey Wade	Results
59	$1,000 Super Seniors No-Limit Hold'em	2,668	(United States) Massoud Eskandari (1/1)	$330,609	(United States) Jennifer Gianera	Results
60	$10,000 Short Deck No-Limit Hold'em	110	(Japan) Shota Nakanishi (1/1)	$277,212	(United States) Ben Lamb (0/1)	Results
o6	$500 No-Limit Hold'em Turbo Deepstack	1,746	(Bulgaria) Martin Stoyanov (1/1)	$132,783	(Ukraine) Arkadiy Tsinis (0/1)	
61	$10,000/$1,000 Ladies No-Limit Hold'em Championship	1,074	(Austria) Jessica Teusl (1/1)	$166,975	(United States) Julie Le	Results
62	$1,500 Super Turbo Bounty No-Limit Hold'em	2,569	(United States) Dash Dudley (1/3)	$301,396	(United States) David Sanchez	Results
63	$10,000 Pot-Limit Omaha Hi-Lo 8 or Better Championship	284	(Israel) Eli Elezra (1/5)	$611,362	(United States) Chino Rheem	Results
64	$600 Pot-Limit Omaha Deepstack	2,858	(Bulgaria) Konstantin Angelov (1/1)	$199,466	(United States) Gregg Merkow	Results
65	$3,000 Freezeout No-Limit Hold'em	1,359	(United States) David Jackson (1/2)	$598,173	(United States) Phil Hellmuth (0/16)	Results
66	$1,000 Mini Main Event No-Limit Hold'em	5,832	(United States) Young Sik Eum (1/1)	$594,189	(Romania) Cosmin Joldis	Results
67	$10,000 Super Turbo Bounty No-Limit Hold'em	419	(Argentina) Nacho Barbero (1/1)	$587,520	(Brazil) Fabiano Kovalski	Results
68	$1,000 Million Dollar Bounty No-Limit Hold'em	14,112	(United States) Quincy Borland (1/1)	$750,120	(United States) Kevin Hong	Results
69	$10,000 Pot-Limit Omaha 8-Handed Championship	683	(United States) Sean Troha (1/1)	$1,246,770	(United States) Shiva Dudani	Results
70	$10,000 No-Limit Hold'em Main Event	8,663	(Norway) Espen Jørstad (2/2)	$10,000,000	(Australia) Adrian Attenborough	Results
o7	$500 No-Limit Hold'em Deepstack	2,161	(United States) Sane Chung (1/1)	$149,729	(Canada) Dylan Smith	
71	$1,111 One More for One Drop No-Limit Hold'em	5,702	(United States) Mike Allis (1/1)	$535,610	(United States) Ryan Riess (0/1)	Results
72	$1,500 Mixed Omaha	771	(United States) Bradley Anderson (1/1)	$195,565	(United States) Scott Abrams	Results
73	$1,500 Razz	383	(United States) Daniel Strelitz (1/2)	$115,723	(United States) Lynda Tran	Results
74	$1,500 Bounty Pot-Limit Omaha	1,390	(Canada) Pei Li (1/1)	$190,219	(United States) Nolan King	Results
75	$777 Lucky 7's No-Limit Hold'em	6,891	(France) Gregory Teboul (1/1)	$777,777	(United States) Rodney Turvin	Results
76	$1,979 Poker Hall of Fame Bounty No-Limit Hold'em	865	(South Korea) Hong Jin-ho (1/1)	$276,067	(Thailand) Punnat Punsri	Results
o8	$7,777 Lucky 7's No-Limit Hold'em High Roller	161	(United Kingdom) Harry Lodge (1/1)	$396,366	(United States) Andrew Robl	
o9	$1,000 No-Limit Hold'em Online Championship	994	(United States) Yevgeniy Minakrin (1/1)	$238,315	(Moldova) Dragos Trofimov	
77	$1,500 Mixed No-Limit Hold'em/Pot-Limit Omaha	1,234	(United States) Sandeep Pulusani (1/2)	$277,949	(United States) Esther Taylor-Brady	Results
78	$2,500 No-Limit Hold'em	1,364	(Canada) Sebastien Aube (1/1)	$499,636	(France) Julien Loire	Results
79	$10,000 Razz Championship	125	(France) Julien Martini (1/4)	$328,906	(United States) Hal Rotholz	Results
o10	$3,200 No-Limit Hold'em High Roller 8-Max	340	(France) Julien Perouse (1/1)	$324,767	(United States) Calvin Anderson (0/2)	
80	$600 Mixed No-Limit Hold'em/Pot-Limit Omaha Deepstack	2,107	(Latvia) Romans Voitovs (1/1)	$158,609	(United States) Michael Dobbs	Results
81	$5,000 Freezeout No-Limit Hold'em 8-Handed	756	(United States) Mo Arani (1/1)	$665,459	(Netherlands) Johannes Straver	Results
82	$800 No-Limit Hold'em Deepstack 8-Handed	2,812	(United States) Richard Alsup (1/1)	$272,065	(United States) Gary Whitehead	Results
83	$50,000 High Roller No-Limit Hold'em	97	(Portugal) João Vieira (1/2)	$1,384,413	(Spain) Lander Lijo	Results
84	$3,000 H.O.R.S.E.	327	(United States) Lawrence Brandt (2/2)	$205,139	(United States) Roberto Marin	Results
85	$1,500 The Closer No-Limit Hold'em	2,968	(United States) Minh Nguyen (1/1)	$536,280	(South Africa) Ahmed Karrim	Results
86	$10,000 No-Limit Hold'em 6-Handed Championship	394	(United States) Gregory Jensen (1/1)	$824,649	(Moldova) Pavel Plesuv	Results
87	$5,000 No-Limit Hold'em 8-Handed	573	(United States) Michael Wang (1/2)	$541,604	(Colombia) Farid Jattin	Results
o11	$777 No-Limit Hold'em Lucky 7's Second Chance	781	(United States) Fred Li (1/1)	$159,060	(United States) Zach Okin	
88	$1,000 Super Turbo No-Limit Hold'em	1,282	(Canada) Jaspal Brar (1/1)	$190,731	(United States) Jesse Lonis	Results
o12	$5,300 No-Limit Hold'em High Roller Freezeout Encore	245	(Italy) Gianluca Speranza (1/1)	$324,625	(United States) Paul Scaturro	
o13	$500 No-Limit Hold'em Summer Saver	1,189	(United States) Shaun O'Donnell (1/1)	$125,330	(United States) Benjamin Chung	
89	WSOP Tournament of Champions	470	(United States) Benjamin Kaupp (1/1)	$250,000	(United States) Raul Garza	Results

=== Michigan Online ===
#	Event	Entrants	Winner	Prize	Runner-up
o1	$500 No-Limit Hold'em Big 500	242	(United States) Brett Blackwood (1/1)	$35,559	(United States) Andrew Rosen
o2	$400 No-Limit Hold'em Ultra Deepstack	275	(United States) Todd Estes (1/1)	$27,896	(United States) Corey Paggeot
o3	$500 Pot-Limit Omaha 6-Max	141	(United States) John Macleod (1/1)	$21,387	(United States) Timothy Mulroy
o4	$600 Online Deepstack Championship	176	(United States) Adam Kittle (1/1)	$30,420	(United States) Marcus Norman
o5	$500 No-Limit Hold'em Deepstack	180	(United States) Freddie Kirkland (1/1)	$26,038	(United States) Christopher Hando
o6	$500 No-Limit Hold'em Online Bracelet Championship	108	(United States) Cade Lautenbacher (1/1)	$28,829	(United States) Robert Gincott
o7	$777 No-Limit Hold'em Lucky 7's	98	(United States) Ryan Hiller (1/1)	$21,947	(United States) Joseph Cervo
o8	$500 No-Limit Hold'em Summer Saver	179	(United States) Matthew Garza (1/1)	$27,824	(United States) Germandio Andoni

=== Pennsylvania Online ===
#	Event	Entrants	Winner	Prize	Runner-up
o1	$500 No-Limit Hold'em Big 500	204	(United States) Joseph Kuczewski (1/1)	$30,970	(United States) Michael Duffy
o2	$400 No-Limit Hold'em Ultra Deepstack	218	(United States) Christopher Perkins (1/1)	$24,960	(United States) Kyle Lorenz
o3	$500 Pot-Limit Omaha 6-Max	90	(United States) Mark Dellavecchio (1/1)	$17,292	(United States) Robert Lavin
o4	$600 Online Deepstack Championship	153	(United States) Stephen Jarrett (1/1)	$26,979	(United States) Joshua Berardi
o5	$500 No-Limit Hold'em Deepstack	136	(United States) Jonas Wexler (1/1)	$19,615	(United States) Anthony Garofalo
o6	$500 No-Limit Hold'em Online Bracelet Championship	94	(United States) Alex Schwint (1/1)	$27,055	(United States) Jonas Wexler (1/1)
o7	$777 No-Limit Hold'em Lucky 7's	89	(United States) Peter Williamson (1/1)	$20,519	(United States) Ryan Messick
o8	$500 No-Limit Hold'em Summer Saver	166	(United States) Ryan Messick (1/1)	$24,300	(United States) Michael McNeil

== Player of the Year ==
Final standings as of July 20 (note: does not include events from the 2022 WSOP Online series or the 2022 WSOP Europe series)

Standings
Rank	Name	Points	Bracelets
1	(United States) Daniel Zack	4,530.64	2
2	(United States) Daniel Weinman	4,040.20	1
3	(Germany) Koray Aldemir	3,275.02	0
4	(United States) Shaun Deeb	3,197.65	0
5	(United States) David Peters	2,982.08	1
6	(China) Yueqi Zhu	2,766.27	0
7	(Portugal) João Vieira	2,752.88	1
8	(Brazil) João Simão	2,735.76	1
9	(United States) Alex Foxen	2,548.47	1
10	(United States) Brian Rast	2,520.06	0

== Main Event ==
The $10,000 No Limit Hold'em Main Event began on July 3. The event had 8,663 entries, which marked the second-largest Main Event field in WSOP history, only behind 2006.

=== Performance of past champions ===
Name	Championship Year(s)	Day of Elimination
Johnny Chan	1987, 1988	2D
Phil Hellmuth	1989	2ABC
Scotty Nguyen	1998	3
Chris Moneymaker	2003	4 (1198th)*
Greg Raymer	2004	1C
Joe Hachem	2005	2D
Joe Cada	2009	2ABC
Greg Merson	2012	4 (610th)*
Ryan Riess	2013	4 (1182nd)*
Martin Jacobson	2014	2ABC
Joe McKeehen	2015	3
Qui Nguyen	2016	2ABC
John Cynn	2018	4 (550th)*
Hossein Ensan	2019	1C
Damian Salas	2020	7 (27th)*
Koray Aldemir	2021	6 (75th)*

*- Denotes player who finished in the money

=== Other notable high finishes ===
NB: This list is restricted to top 100 finishers with an existing Wikipedia entry.

Place	Name	Prize
17th	Kenny Tran	$410,000
27th	Damian Salas	$262,300
35th	Marco Johnson	$262,300
75th	Koray Aldemir	$101,700

=== Final Table ===
Name	Number of chips (percentage of total)	WSOP Bracelets	WSOP Cashes*	WSOP Earnings*
(United States) Matthew Su	80,800,000 (15.5%)	0	0	0
(Croatia) Matija Dobric	78,950,000 (15.2%)	0	11	$235,513
(Norway) Espen Jørstad	68,400,000 (13.2%)	1	22	$810,052
(Argentina) Michael Duek	65,075,000 (12.5%)	0	4	$608,839
(United States) Jeffrey Farnes	56,150,000 (10.8%)	0	6	$27,509
(Canada) Aaron Duczak	55,400,000 (10.7%)	0	35	$144,269
(United Kingdom) John Eames	54,950,000 (10.6%)	0	18	$273,286
(Australia) Adrian Attenborough	44,200,000 (8.5%)	0	5	$27,659
(United Kingdom) Philippe Souki	15,900,000 (3.1%)	0	7	$39,067

*Career statistics prior to the Main Event

=== Final Table results ===
Place	Name	Prize
1st	Espen Jørstad	$10,000,000
2nd	Adrian Attenborough	$6,000,000
3rd	Michael Duek	$4,000,000
4th	John Eames	$3,000,000
5th	Matija Dobric	$2,250,000
6th	Jeffrey Farnes	$1,750,000
7th	Aaron Duczak	$1,350,000
8th	Philippe Souki	$1,075,000
9th	Matthew Su	$850,675

== The Poker Players Championship ==
The $50,000 Poker Players Championship began on June 26. The 7-handed final table was reached on June 29, and the final 5-handed was played on June 30.

The event attracted 112 entries, generating a prize pool of $5,362,000. It was the biggest turnout in this event since 2013. The top 17 players finished in the money, with the champion earning $1,449,103.

=== Performance of past champions ===
Name	Championship Year(s)	Day of Elimination
Freddy Deeb	2007	3
David Bach	2009	2
Michael Mizrachi	2010, 2012, 2018	3
Brian Rast	2011, 2016	2
Matthew Ashton	2013	4 (8th)*
Mike Gorodinsky	2015	2
Elior Sion	2017	2
Phil Hui	2019	2
Daniel Cates	2021	Winner*

*- Denotes player who finished in the money

=== Other notable high finishes ===
NB: This list is restricted to in the money finishers with an existing Wikipedia entry.

Place	Name	Prize
8th	Matthew Ashton	$155,421
9th	Daniel Weinman	$155,421
12th	John Racener	$100,866
15th	David "ODB" Baker	$83,738
17th	Dan Smith	$83,738

=== Final Table results ===
Daniel Cates won his second Poker Players Championship title, becoming the first ever back-to-back winner of the event.

Place	Name	Prize
1st	(United States) Daniel Cates	$1,449,103
2nd	(Brazil) Yuri Dzivielevski	$895,614
3rd	(Japan) Naoya Kihara	$639,257
4th	(United Kingdom) Benny Glaser	$464,420
5th	(Germany) Johannes Becker	$343,531
6th	(Germany) Koray Aldemir	$258,812
7th	(United States) Taylor Paur	$198,661
