= USPC =

USPC may refer to:

- The United States Poker Championship
- United States Pony Clubs
- United States Playing Card Company (USPC)
- Heckler & Koch USP Compact Variant (USPc)
- United States Parole Commission
- Peace Corps, also known as the United States Peace Corps (USPC)
- Urban Sports Performance Centre
