= James Caporuscio =

American poker player

James Caporuscio is an American poker player from Sayville, New York.

== Poker career ==
On October 4, 2005, Caporuscio won the 2005 $10,000 United States Poker Championship Main Event. He won $831,532 in a field that contained 225 players. The tournament was his first major cash. In Season 4 of the World Poker Tour, he cashed in the $10,000 buy-in 2nd Annual Doyle Brunson North American Poker Championship.

As of 2017, Caporuscio's live tournament winnings exceed $840,000.
