= Alex Jacob =

American poker player (born 1984)

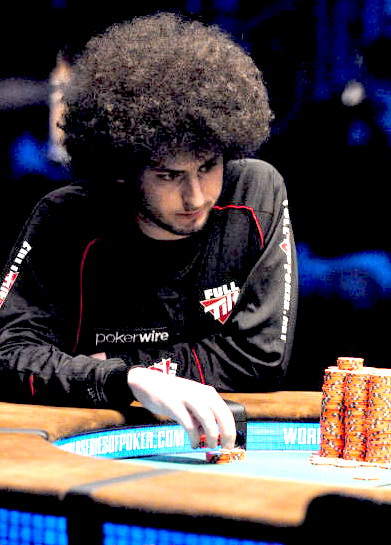
- Jacob at the 2007 World Series of Poker.
- Nickname: Fro-Poker
- Born: October 27, 1984 (age 42); Houston, Texas, U.S.

World Series of Poker
- Bracelet: None
- Money finishes: 25
- Highest WSOP Main Event finish: 390th, 2010

World Poker Tour
- Title: None
- Final table: 1
- Money finishes: 3

Alex Jacob (born October 27, 1984) is an American former professional poker player and game show contestant.

Jacob is perhaps best known in poker for winning the 2006 main event at the United States Poker Championship, a no-limit Texas hold 'em event televised by ESPN. He has also appeared at televised final tables at the World Series of Poker and the World Poker Tour. In 2015, after leaving professional poker, Jacob became a contestant on Jeopardy!, where he won six games and the show's Tournament of Champions.

== Education ==
In 2002, Jacob was the valedictorian of Deerfield Beach High School, where he was in the International Baccalaureate (IB) program.

In May 2006, Jacob graduated from Yale University with a degree in economics and mathematics.

== Poker career ==
Among Jacob's biggest poker accomplishments are winning the Peter A. Fabrizio Memorial Poker Classic in 2003 and finishing runner-up at the 2006 World Poker Tour (WPT) tournament in Foxwoods Resort Casino on April 9, 2006, winning $655,507. Jacob won his biggest prize to date by winning the 2006 U.S. Poker Championship with a first-place prize of $878,500. Jacob has 4 WSOP Final Tables, including a 3rd in Event 3 in No-Limit hold'em at the 2007 World Series of Poker.

At Yale, Jacob's poker talent was spotted by James McManus as early as 2004, when McManus sat down one night to play with Jacob. Months later, McManus mentioned Jacob in an article about the experience.

As of 2012, Jacob's total live tournament winnings exceed $2,600,000. His 25 cashes at the WSOP account for $832,559 of those winnings.

== Jeopardy! ==
Jacob appeared on the game show Jeopardy! in 2015. He won in his first appearance on the show on April 10 and went on to win five more games before losing on April 20, winning a grand total of $151,802 in seven appearances. Jacob's victories qualified him for the 2015 Tournament of Champions, which he won, collecting the grand prize of $250,000. In addition to using the "Forrest Bounce" originated by Chuck Forrest, Jacob also pioneered the strategy of aggressive Daily Double wagers that was used with even greater success by James Holzhauer in 2019.

Jacob later appeared in the All-Star Games with team captain Buzzy Cohen and 2015 Teachers' Tournament champion Jennifer Giles. His team went home with $75,000 after losing the wild card match.

== Endorsements ==
Jacob is a frequent player on the trivia app FleetWit, especially in the high-stakes races where top prizes are in the hundreds of dollars. He has won over $24,000 to date. Jacob was also noted for winning a $20,000 prize on the HQ Trivia app in June 2019, which HQ Trivia had failed to pay a month after his win. However, Jacob received his payout in August.
