= Daniel Weinman =

American poker player (born 1988)

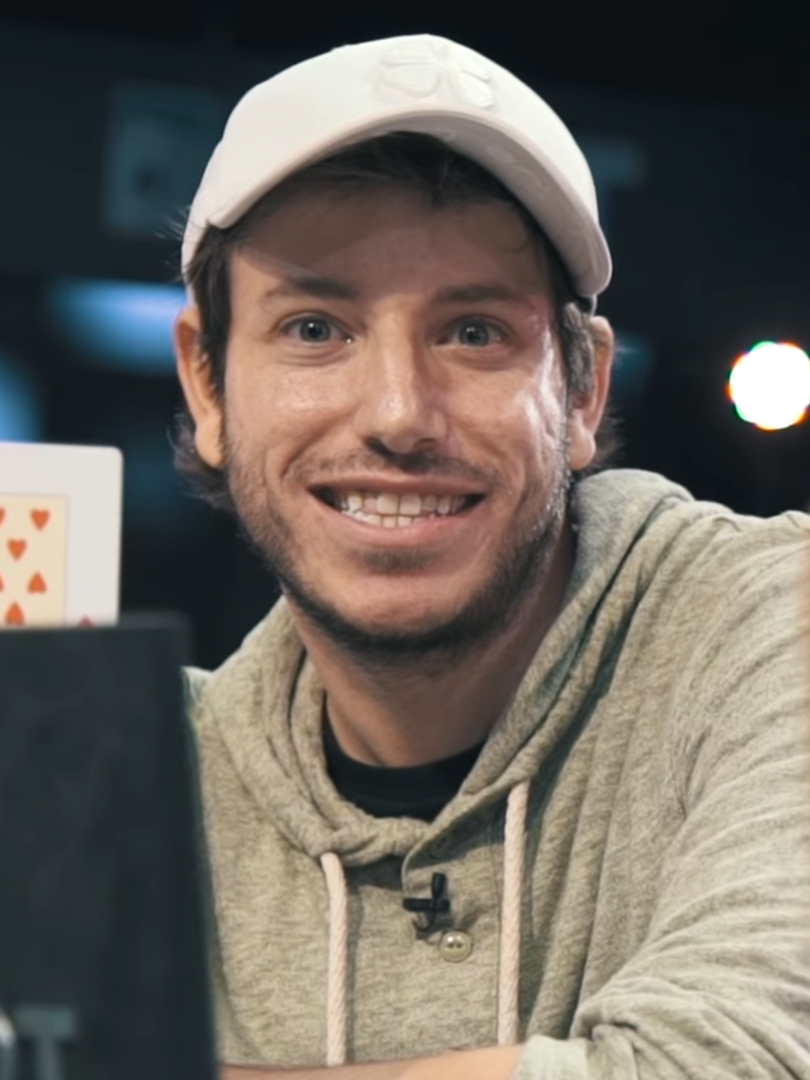
- Weinman at the 2017 WPT Tournament of Champions
- Born: February 3, 1988 (age 38)

World Series of Poker
- Bracelets: 2
- Final tables: 9
- Money finishes: 70
- Highest WSOP Main Event finish: Winner, 2023

World Poker Tour
- Titles: 2
- Final tables: 2
- Money finishes: 7

European Poker Tour
- Money finishes: 4

Daniel Weinman (born February 3, 1988) is an American professional poker player from Atlanta, Georgia. He won the World Series of Poker Main Event in 2023.

== Career ==
Weinman graduated from Georgia Institute of Technology in 2009 with a degree in mechanical engineering and worked as an engineer before beginning his poker career.

Weinman made his first WSOP final table in 2012 in a Pot Limit Hold'em event. In 2015, he won a WSOP Circuit event in Cherokee, North Carolina for $280,000.

Weinman won two World Poker Tour events in 2017. He first beat out a field of 1,312 players to win the Borgata Winter Poker Open in February, earning $892,000. He later won the season-ending WPT Tournament of Champions in April for $381,500.

At the 2022 WSOP, Weinman had 19 cashes and made three final tables. He won his first WSOP bracelet in the $1,000 Pot-Limit Omaha event, earning $255,000, and finished second to Daniel Zack for WSOP Player of the Year.

Weinman first cashed in the WSOP Main Event in 2021, finishing in 173rd place. In 2023, he won a three-way all-in pot with pocket jacks against pocket kings and pocket queens and entered the final table in third chip position with 81,700,000. He beat Steven Jones on the 164th hand of the final table and 24th of heads-up with K♣ J♦ when both players hit a pair of jacks on the flop to win the bracelet and $12,100,000 top prize in the largest Main Event field in history.

== Personal life ==
Weinman is an avid golfer and plays to a scratch handicap. He played in a qualifier for the U.S. Mid-Amateur Golf Championship in 2023.

== World Series of Poker bracelets ==
| Year | Tournament | Prize (US$) |
|---|---|---|
| 2022 | $1,000 Pot-Limit Omaha | $255,359 |
| 2023 | $10,000 No-Limit Hold'em Main Event | $12,100,000 |
