= Espen Jørstad =

Norwegian poker player (born 1988)

- Born: 1988 (age 37–38); Levanger Municipality, Norway

World Series of Poker
- Bracelets: 2
- Final tables: 4
- Money finishes: 23
- Highest WSOP Main Event finish: Winner, 2022

World Poker Tour
- Money finishes: 2

European Poker Tour
- Money finishes: 2

Espen Uhlen Jørstad (born May 1988) is a Norwegian professional poker player currently residing in London, England. In 2022, he won the World Series of Poker Main Event for $10,000,000.

== Career ==
Jørstad obtained a master's degree in brewing science from the University of Copenhagen and worked at a brewery before his poker career.

Jørstad started streaming on Twitch in 2016 under alias uhlenpoker as a sponsored Unibet poker pro, before rebranding to group channel overbetexpress.

Playing under the names "Hymn2ninkasi" on PokerStars and "COVFEFE-19" on GGPoker, Jørstad primarily focused on cash games. He reached his first World Series of Poker final table in 2020, finishing in fifth place in a $400 Fifty Stack event during the WSOP Online. In 2021, he was sixth in the WSOP Online Main Event, earning $603,058.

Jørstad won his first WSOP bracelet in 2022, partnering with Patrick Leonard in the Tag Team event. In the Main Event, he made the final table in a field of 8,663, the second-largest in WSOP history, and went heads-up against Adrian Attenborough. On the 19th hand of heads-up play, Jørstad shoved all in on a board of 4♥ 2♥ 2♣ 8♠ Q♣ and Attenborough called with J♣ 4♠. Jørstad had Q♦ 2♠ for a full house to win the championship. He became the first Main Event champion from Norway.

As of August 2026, Jørstad's total live earnings exceed $19,700,000, placing him second on Norway's all-time money list.

== World Series of Poker bracelets ==
Year	Tournament	Prize (US$)
2022	$1,000 Tag Team No-Limit Hold'em (w/ Patrick Leonard)	$74,042
2022	$10,000 No-Limit Hold'em Main Event	$10,000,000
