= Richard Tatalovich =

American poker player

Richard Tatalovich is an American poker player from Scottsdale, Arizona.

== Poker career ==
Tatalovich has been a veteran of the live poker tournament circuit for over twenty years. His biggest cash came when he won the 2000 United States Poker Championship Main Event for $318,000 by defeating a field of 106 total players. He defeated poker professional John Juanda in heads-up play. In Season 12 of the World Poker Tour, he finished in eighth place in the 2013 Borgata Poker Open Main Event for $98,514. Over the course of his poker career, he has cashed in the World Series of Poker 34 times for $249,180 and made one final table.

As of 2018, Tatalovich's lifetime poker winnings exceed $1,660,000.
