= The United States Poker Championship =

American poker tournament series

The United States Poker Championship (USPC) was a major annual stop on the poker tournament tour. This event was held at the Trump Taj Mahal in Atlantic City, New Jersey. The series started in 1996, took one year off in 1997, and ran every year from 1998–2010. This series of poker tournaments culminated with a $10,000 no-limit Texas hold 'em championship tournament televised by ESPN and commentated by Lon McEachern and Norman Chad. The last time this tournament series was run was 2010.

== Main Event Results by Year ==
Year	Winner	Prize	Runner-Up	Other Finalists
1996	Ken Flaton	$500,000	Surinder Sunar	Phil Hellmuth; Jamie Ligator; Paul McKinney; Jerry Cusack
1998	Ray Lamoureaux	$148,000	O'Neil Longson	Michael Piari; Dewey Tomko; Maureen Feduniak; Paul McKinney
1999	Daniel Negreanu	$210,000	John Bonetti	Jason Viriyayuthakorn; John Brewer; David Plastik; Don Zewin
2000	Richard Tatalovich	$318,000	John Juanda	Eric Panayiotou; Ken Goldstein; Hemish Shah; Steve Kaufman
2001	Men Nguyen	$228,000	John Juanda	Adam Schoenfeld; T. J. Cloutier; Satish Vitha; John Urpsis; Tony Ma; Chris Tsiprailidis; Scott Byron
2002	John Hennigan	$216,000	Erik Seidel	Eric Buchman; Charlie Bae; Robert Toft; Tony Popejoy; John Juanda; William Shapiro; Patrick Kelly
2003	Toto Leonidas	$388,080	Erik Seidel	Phil Hellmuth; Frank Russomanno; John Hennigan; Trong Le; Kenneth Jacoby; Ray Ho Lin; Mickey Appleman
2004	John Aglialoro	$691,096	Joe Cassidy	Hoyt Corkins; Walter Hollander; Dean Schultz; John D'Agostino; Matthew Glantz; Alan Colon; Brian Haveson
2005	James Caporuscio	$831,532	Ralph Pecorale	Steve Brecher; Men Nguyen; John Juanda; Chris Furbert; Andrew Barta; Frank Vizza; Michael Santoro
2006	Alex Jacob	$878,500	Jordan Morgan	Michael DeMichele; Daniel Shak; Stephen Feraca; Dale Pinchot; Jeffrey King; Augustin Mendez; Shane Schleger
2007	Adam Gerber	$606,095	Louis Lee	Matthew Glantz; Edward Brogdon; Victor Ramdin; Jared Okun; Svetlana Gromenkova; Tommy Wang; Gavin Smith*
2008	Robert Ford	$221,936	Duane Hunton	Mike Leah; Wooyang Lin; Frank Vizza; Steve Gross
2009	William Brindise	$261,800	Men Nguyen	Eric Ladny; Gordon Eng; Brian Lemke; Nick Binger; Anton Smolyanskiy; Eugene Katchalov; Steven Wolansky
2010	Edward Gamaitoni	$167,616	David Gillen	Patrick Carron; Mike Sica; Gerald David; David King; Trevor Savage; Eric Panayiotou; Christopher Cappell

* The final table of the 2007 tournament had only eight players, as Smith was eliminated with another player on the same hand. Smith had more chips at the time of the hand and therefore the higher finish.
