= Daniel Cates =

American poker player (born 1989)

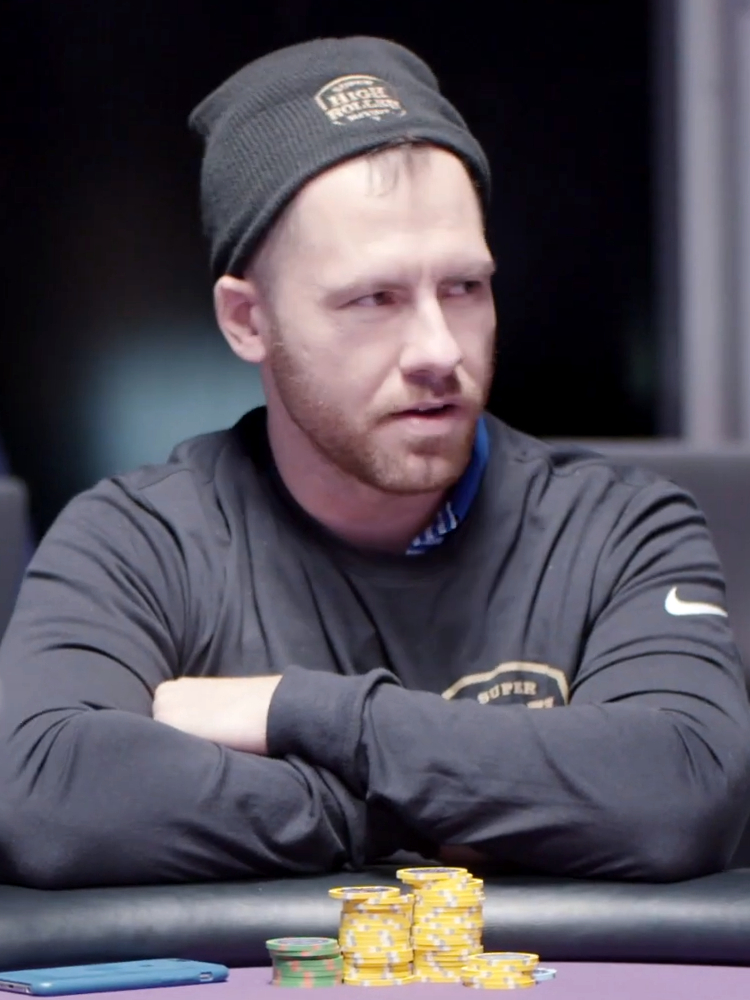
- Cates in 2018
- Nicknames: Jungleman jungleman12 w00ki3z.
- Born: November 14, 1989 (age 37); Bowie, Maryland, U.S.

World Series of Poker
- Bracelets: 2
- Money finishes: 4
- Highest WSOP Main Event finish: 775th, 2015

World Poker Tour
- Titles: 2
- Final tables: 2
- Money finishes: 2

European Poker Tour
- Title: 1
- Final tables: 3
- Money finishes: 3

Daniel Cates (born November 14, 1989) also known as Jungleman, jungleman12 or w00ki3z. is a professional poker player from the United States, once considered to be one of the best heads-up No Limit Texas Hold 'em players in the world. By 2014, his online cash game earnings at Full Tilt Poker and PokerStars was over US$11 million. In 2010, he won over $5 million, making him the biggest winner for the year.

== Early life ==
Cates was born and raised in Bowie, Maryland, and began playing poker at the age of 17. He has said that at first he was a big loser and even took a job at McDonald's in order to refuel his bankroll. He describes his childhood as "weird, a bit aloof and mostly spent alone". He spent much of his time playing Command and Conquer and had an uncontrollable obsession with video games. He studied Economics at the University of Maryland before dropping out of college to make poker a full-time career.

== Poker ==
Cates began playing online poker under the screen name "jungleman12" at the $0.25/$0.50 level as well as losing money in his local casino game before employing "reverse game selection" in order to take on and beat the best players at his stakes in heads-up matches before moving up the limits. He went from $0.25/$0.50 to $25/$50 in two years.

In 2009, Cates lost most of his bankroll to Viktor Blom at Full Tilt Poker before rebuilding. In 2010, he began to play higher and higher stakes, racking up victories against many noted pros, including heads-up specialist Tom Dwan. In August 2010, Cates agreed to take the Durrrr Challenge, playing Dwan at four tables of $200/$400 no limit for 50,000 hands. If Cates should beat Dwan by $1 or more after 50,000 hands, he will win $1.5 million from Dwan. As of April 2011, the two had played 19,335 hands, and Cates was up over a million dollars. On December 31, 2018, Cates called out Dwan publicly on Twitter for his apparent welching. However, Cates also said that Dwan paid out approximately $700,000 in 2017.

On August 13, 2015, Cates announced via Twitter that he lost HK$38 million (US$5 million) at a casino in Manila.

As of April 2025, his total live tournament winnings exceed $18,000,000.

=== World Series of Poker ===
Cates has two World Series of Poker bracelets, both in the Poker Players Championship. He claimed his first bracelet in 2021, after defeating Ryan Leng heads-up. He claimed his second bracelet in 2022, after defeating Yuri Dzivielevski heads-up. He is the first person to win the Poker Players Championship in consecutive years.

World Series of Poker bracelets
Year	Tournament	Prize (US$)
2021	$50,000 Poker Players Championship 6-Handed	$954,020
2022	$50,000 Poker Players Championship 6-Handed	$1,449,103
