= Ali Eslami =

American poker player and business strategist

- Born: March 26; Tehran, Iran
- Occupations: Business analyst, poker player

World Series of Poker
- Bracelet: 1
- Final tables: 2
- Money finishes: 38

Ali Eslami is a business strategist and renowned high-stakes poker player primarily focused on limit mix-games.

== Biography ==
Eslami is one of the first two people to win the Man-Machine Poker Competition. He represented the United States on the U.S. Poker team in the IFP's Nation's Cup inaugural event.

Since Eslami's appearance at the Legends of Poker WPT Season 2 in 2003, he has gone on to pocket over $200,000 with over 14 cash showings in tournament play. Eslami is primarily a cash game player, however, playing chiefly in high-limit poker games in Los Angeles.

In June 2007, Ali Eslami took 5th in the 2007 World Series of Poker, $2,500 H.O.R.S.E event.

Following his showing in the 2007 WSOP event, Eslami appeared alongside fellow professional poker player Phil Laak in July 2007 to participate in a competition against Polaris, the University of Alberta poker bot. The matches consisted of 500 hands with four matches total and 16 hours of cumulative play, in Texas Hold'Em poker. Eslami and Laak split the $10,000 prize for defeating the bot in two of the four matches and an additional $2,500 for drawing in a third.

In November 2011 Eslami represented the United States as part of the U.S. Poker Team in the International Federation of Poker's Poker Nation's Cup, held in London, England.

Eslami won a bracelet in the 2022 WSOP $1,500 Seven Card Stud Hi-Lo 8 or Better event.
