= Daniel Zack =

American poker player (born 1993)

- Born: Princeton, New Jersey, U.S.

World Series of Poker
- Bracelets: 4
- Final tables: 27
- Money finishes: 136
- Highest WSOP Main Event finish: 21st, 2020

World Poker Tour
- Money finishes: 3

Daniel Zack (born December 1993) is an American professional poker player from Princeton, New Jersey. He was the 2022 World Series of Poker Player of the Year, after winning two bracelets and obtaining two additional final tables. Prior to this, Zack had won a WSOP circuit ring in 2014, and a bracelet in 2019. Zack won his fourth WSOP bracelet in 2025, bringing his career earnings to over $4,800,000.

== World Series of Poker Bracelets ==
Year	Tournament	Prize (US$)
2019	$2,500 Limit Mixed Triple Draw	$160,447
2022	$10,000 Omaha Hi-Lo 8 or Better Championship	$440,757
2022	$10,000 Seven Card Hi-Lo 8 or Better Championship	$324,174
2025	$3,000 Pot-Limit Omaha 6-Handed	$471,170
