= 2018 World Series of Poker results =

Below are the results of the 2018 World Series of Poker, held from May 30-July 17 at the Rio All Suite Hotel and Casino in Las Vegas, Nevada.

== Key ==
*	Elected to the Poker Hall of Fame
(#/#)	This denotes a bracelet winner. The first number is the number of bracelets won in the 2018 WSOP. The second number is the total number of bracelets won. Both numbers represent totals as of that point during the tournament.
Place	What place each player at the final table finished
Name	The player who made it to the final table
Prize (US$)	The amount of money awarded for each finish at the event's final table

== Results ==
=== Event #1: $565 Casino Employees No Limit Hold'em ===
- 2-Day Event: May 30–31
- Number of Entries: 566
- Total Prize Pool: $283,000
- Number of Payouts: 85
- Winning Hand: K♣ Q♦

Final Table
Place	Name	Prize
1st	Jordan Hufty (1/1)	$61,909
2nd	Jodie Sanders	$38,246
3rd	Katie Kopp	$26,250
4th	Zachary Seymour	$18,332
5th	Won Kim	$13,031
6th	Tom Booker	$9,432
7th	Thomas Yenowine	$6,953
8th	Skyler Yeaton	$5,222
9th	Jason Pepper	$3,998

=== Event #2: $10,000 No Limit Hold'em Super Turbo Bounty ===
- 1-Day Event: May 30
- Number of Entries: 243
- Total Prize Pool: $2,284,200
- Number of Payouts: 37
- Winning Hand: 2♣ 2♠

Final Table
Place	Name	Prize
1st	Elio Fox (1/2)	$393,693
2nd	Adam Adler	$243,323
3rd	Paul Volpe (0/2)	$169,195
4th	Danny Wong	$119,659
5th	Charles Johanin	$86,096
6th	Alex Foxen	$63,042
7th	David Eldridge	$46,993
8th	Taylor Black	$35,671
9th	Joe Cada (0/2)	$27,582

=== Event #3: $3,000 No Limit Hold'em Shootout ===
- 3-Day Event: May 31-June 2
- Number of Entries: 363
- Total Prize Pool: $980,100
- Number of Payouts: 50
- Winning Hand: J♥ 3♣

Final Table
Place	Name	Prize
1st	Joe Cada (1/3)	$226,218
2nd	Sam Phillips	$139,804
3rd	Joe McKeehen (0/2)	$101,766
4th	Jack Maskill	$74,782
5th	Harry Lodge	$55,480
6th	Ihar Soika	$41,559
7th	Anthony Reategui (0/1)	$31,435
8th	Taylor Wilson	$24,013
9th	Joshua Turner	$18,526
10th	Jeffrey Trudeau	$14,437

=== Event #4: $1,500 Omaha Hi-Lo 8 or Better ===
- 4-Day Event: May 31-June 3
- Number of Entries: 911
- Total Prize Pool: $1,229,850
- Number of Payouts: 137
- Winning Hand: K♦ 10♠ 4♦ 4♠

Final Table
Place	Name	Prize
1st	Julien Martini (1/1)	$239,771
2nd	Kate Hoang	$148,150
3rd	Mack Lee	$104,016
4th	William Kopp	$74,058
5th	Brandon Ageloff	$53,482
6th	Chad Eveslage	$39,182
7th	Rafael Concepcion	$29,128
8th	Denny Axel	$21,977
9th	Tammer Ilcaffas	$16,832

=== Event #5: $100,000 No Limit Hold'em High Roller ===
- 4-Day Event: June 1–4
- Number of Entries: 105
- Total Prize Pool: $10,185,000
- Number of Payouts: 16
- Winning Hand: Q♣ 8♠

Final Table
Place	Name	Prize
1st	Nick Petrangelo (1/2)	$2,910,227
2nd	Elio Fox (1/2)	$1,798,658
3rd	Aymon Hata	$1,247,230
4th	Andreas Eiler	$886,793
5th	Bryn Kenney (0/1)	$646,927
6th	Stephen Chidwick	$484,551
7th	Jason Koon	$372,894
8th	Adrián Mateos (0/3)	$295,066

=== Event #6: $365 Giant No Limit Hold'em ===
- 7-Day Event: June 1, 8, 15, 22, 29-July 1
- Number of Entries: 8,920
- Total Prize Pool: $2,676,000
- Number of Payouts: 1,797
- Winning Hand: K♦ 10♦

Final Table
Place	Name	Prize
1st	Jeremy Perrin (1/1)	$250,000
2nd	Luis Vazquez	$154,512
3rd	Svetlozar Nestorov	$117,531
4th	Renato Kaneoya	$89,686
5th	Alexander Lakhov	$68,605
6th	Kevin Rines	$52,721
7th	Lawrence Chan	$40,627
8th	Matthew Smith	$31,403
9th	Daniel Fuhs (0/1)	$24,353

=== Event #7: $565 Colossus No Limit Hold'em ===
- 6-Day Event: June 2–7
- Number of Entries: 13,070
- Total Prize Pool: $6,535,000
- Number of Payouts: 1,754
- Winning Hand: A♦ J♥

Final Table
Place	Name	Prize
1st	Roberly Felicio (1/1)	$1,000,000
2nd	Sang Liu	$500,000
3rd	Joel Wurtzel	$300,000
4th	Scott Margereson	$220,040
5th	Timothy Miles	$166,091
6th	Song Choe	$126,158
7th	Gunther Dumsky	$96,431
8th	John Racener (0/1)	$74,178
9th	Steven Jones	$57,425

=== Event #8: $2,500 Mixed Triple Draw Lowball ===
- 3-Day Event: June 4–6
- Number of Entries: 321
- Total Prize Pool: $722,250
- Number of Payouts: 49
- Winning Hand: J♠ 5♣ 3♦ A♥
- Note: Includes A-5, 2-7 and Badugi

Final Table
Place	Name	Prize
1st	Johannes Becker (1/1)	$180,455
2nd	Scott Seiver (0/1)	$111,516
3rd	Jesse Hampton	$71,547
4th	Chris Vitch (0/2)	$47,166
5th	George Trigeorgis	$31,973
6th	Luis Velador (0/2)	$22,304

=== Event #9: $10,000 Omaha Hi-Lo 8 or Better Championship ===
- 4-Day Event: June 3–6
- Number of Entries: 169
- Total Prize Pool: $1,588,600
- Number of Payouts: 26
- Winning Hand: A♦ 10♠ 8♥ 3♥

Final Table
Place	Name	Prize
1st	Paul Volpe (1/3)	$417,921
2nd	Eli Elezra (0/3)	$258,297
3rd	Adam Coats	$181,374
4th	Kyle Miaso	$129,648
5th	Viacheslav Zhukov (0/2)	$94,370
6th	Dustin Dirksen	$69,971
7th	Robert Mizrachi (0/4)	$52,866
8th	Daniel Zack	$40,715
9th	Per Hildebrand	$31,977

=== Event #10: $365 WSOP.com Online No Limit Hold'em ===
- 1-Day Event: June 3
- Number of Entries: 2,972
- Total Prize Pool: $974,816
- Number of Payouts: 333
- Winning Hand: 10♦ 9♦

Final Table
Place	Name	Prize
1st	William Reymond (1/1)	$154,996
2nd	Shawn Stroke	$94,265
3rd	Stephen Buell	$69,017
4th	Ryan Belz	$50,593
5th	Elliott Kampen	$37,530
6th	Josh King	$27,977
7th	Anthony Spinella (0/1)	$21,251
8th	Michael Hauptman	$16,279
9th	Jennifer Miller	$12,478

=== Event #11: $365 Giant Pot Limit Omaha ===
- 7-Day Event: June 3, 10, 17, 24, July 1–3
- Number of Entries: 3,250
- Total Prize Pool: $975,000
- Number of Payouts: 464
- Winning Hand: A♠ A♣ K♦ 10♣

Final Table
Place	Name	Prize
1st	Tim Andrew (1/1)	$116,015
2nd	Pete Arroyos	$71,703
3rd	Robert Cicchelli	$53,709
4th	Sandeep Pulusani (0/1)	$40,379
5th	Michael Mizrachi (1/4)	$30,461
6th	James Sievers	$23,076
7th	Kevin Nomberto	$17,541
8th	Raymond Walton	$13,384
9th	Srinivas Balasubramanian	$10,250

=== Event #12: $1,500 Dealers Choice 6-Handed ===
- 3-Day Event: June 4–6
- Number of Entries: 406
- Total Prize Pool: $548,100
- Number of Payouts: 61
- Winning Hand: A♥ A♠ 8♠ 7♠ 6♦ (Big O)

Final Table
Place	Name	Prize
1st	Jeremy Harkin (1/1)	$129,882
2nd	Frankie O'Dell (0/2)	$80,256
3rd	George Trigeorgis	$52,130
4th	Anthony Arvidson	$34,700
5th	James Woods	$23,686
6th	Scott Abrams	$16,589

=== Event #13: $1,500 Big Blind Antes No Limit Hold'em ===
- 4-Day Event: June 5–8
- Number of Entries: 1,306
- Total Prize Pool: $1,763,100
- Number of Payouts: 196
- Winning Hand: A♣ J♠

Final Table
Place	Name	Prize
1st	Benjamin Moon (1/1)	$315,346
2nd	Romain Lewis	$194,837
3rd	Colin Robinson	$138,938
4th	Steven Snyder	$100,268
5th	Nhathanh Nguyen	$73,242
6th	Bohdan Slyvinskyi	$54,160
7th	Eric Polirer	$40,549
8th	Benjamin Ho	$30,742
9th	Dutch Boyd (0/3)	$23,605

=== Event #14: $1,500 No Limit 2-7 Lowball Draw ===
- 3-Day Event: June 5–7
- Number of Entries: 260
- Total Prize Pool: $351,000
- Number of Payouts: 39
- Winning Hand: 9♥ 7♠ 6♦ 4♣ 3♠

Final Table
Place	Name	Prize
1st	Daniel Ospina (1/1)	$87,678
2nd	Tim McDermott	$54,180
3rd	Shaun Deeb (0/2)	$36,330
4th	Mike Wattel (0/2)	$24,920
5th	James Alexander	$17,494
6th	Brant Hale	$12,576
7th	Michael Gathy (0/3)	$9,263
8th	Matt Szymaszek	$6,996

=== Event #15: $1,500 H.O.R.S.E. ===
- 4-Day Event: June 6–9
- Number of Entries: 731
- Total Prize Pool: $986,850
- Number of Payouts: 110
- Winning Hand: 9-2-4-Q-A-4-8 (Razz)

Final Table
Place	Name	Prize
1st	Andrey Zhigalov (1/1)	$202,787
2nd	Timothy Frazin	$125,336
3rd	Bradley Smith	$87,769
4th	Matt Woodward	$62,379
5th	Nicholas Derke	$45,006
6th	Sandeep Vasudevan	$32,971
7th	Scott Clements (0/2)	$24,531
8th	J.W. Smith	$18,541

=== Event #16: $10,000 Heads Up No Limit Hold'em Championship ===
- 3-Day Event: June 6–8
- Number of Entries: 114
- Total Prize Pool: $1,071,600
- Number of Payouts: 8
- Winning Hand: 4♥ 4♦

Final Table
Place	Name	Prize
1st	Justin Bonomo (1/2)	$185,965
2nd	Jason McConnon	$114,933
SF	Juan Pardo Dominguez	$73,179
SF	Martijn Gerrits	$73,179
QF	Jan Eric Schwippert	$31,086
QF	Mark McGovern	$31,086
QF	Nicolai Morris	$31,086
QF	Kahle Burns	$31,086

=== Event #17: $1,500 No Limit Hold'em 6-Handed ===
- 4-Day Event: June 7–10
- Number of Entries: 1,663
- Total Prize Pool: $2,245,050
- Number of Payouts: 250
- Winning Hand: K♦ 6♣

Final Table
Place	Name	Prize
1st	Ognyan Dimov (1/1)	$378,743
2nd	Antonio Barbato	$233,992
3rd	Nick Schulman (0/2)	$163,785
4th	Ryan D'Angelo (0/1)	$116,118
5th	Joey Weissman (0/1)	$83,396
6th	Yue Du (0/1)	$60,686

=== Event #18: $10,000 Dealers Choice 6-Handed ===
- 3-Day Event: June 7–9
- Number of Entries: 111
- Total Prize Pool: $1,043,400
- Number of Payouts: 17
- Winning Hand: 10♣ 3♠ 10♥ 5♠ Q♥ Q♠ A♥ (Stud Hi-Lo)

Final Table
Place	Name	Prize
1st	Adam Friedman (1/2)	$293,275
2nd	Stuart Rutter	$181,258
3rd	Alexey Makarov	$127,487
4th	Chris Klodnicki (0/1)	$90,713
5th	David "ODB" Baker (0/1)	$65,308
6th	Marco Johnson (0/2)	$47,579

=== Event #19: $565 Pot Limit Omaha ===
- 3-Day Event: June 8–10
- Number of Entries: 2,419
- Total Prize Pool: $1,209,500
- Number of Payouts: 354
- Winning Hand: K♦ J♣ 9♠ 5♠

Final Table
Place	Name	Prize
1st	Craig Varnell (1/1)	$181,790
2nd	Seth Zimmerman	$112,347
3rd	Omar Mehmood	$81,852
4th	Maxime Heroux	$60,190
5th	Christopher Trang	$44,677
6th	Jonathan Duhamel (0/3)	$33,477
7th	Shaome Yang	$25,325
8th	Jason Lipiner	$19,344
9th	Ilian Li	$14,920

=== Event #20: $5,000 Big Blind Antes No Limit Hold'em ===
- 4-Day Event: June 8–11
- Number of Entries: 518
- Total Prize Pool: $2,408,700
- Number of Payouts: 78
- Winning Hand: A♥ A♦

Final Table
Place	Name	Prize
1st	Jeremy Wien (1/1)	$537,710
2nd	David Laka	$332,328
3rd	Eric Blair	$228,307
4th	Jake Schindler	$159,575
5th	John Amato	$113,510
6th	Shawn Buchanan	$82,199
7th	David Peters (0/1)	$60,618
8th	Richard Tuhrim	$45,538
9th	Patrick Truong	$34,862

=== Event #21: $1,500 Millionaire Maker No Limit Hold'em ===
- 6-Day Event: June 9–14
- Number of Entries: 7,361
- Total Prize Pool: $9,937,350
- Number of Payouts: 1,105
- Winning Hand: 4♠ 2♠

Final Table
Place	Name	Prize
1st	Arne Kern (1/1)	$1,173,223
2nd	Sam Razavi	$724,756
3rd	Joe McKeehen (0/2)	$538,276
4th	Michael Souza	$402,614
5th	Justin Liberto (0/1)	$303,294
6th	Manuel Ruivo	$230,120
7th	Barny Boatman (0/2)	$175,865
8th	Ralph Massey	$135,383
9th	Sean Marshall	$104,987

=== Event #22: $1,500 Eight Game Mix ===
- 3-Day Event: June 9–11
- Number of Entries: 481
- Total Prize Pool: $649,350
- Number of Payouts: 73
- Winning Hand: Q-2-A-6-5-3-2 (Razz)

Final Table
Place	Name	Prize
1st	Philip Long (1/1)	$147,348
2nd	Kevin Malis	$91,042
3rd	Daniel Negreanu* (0/6)	$59,788
4th	John Racener (0/1)	$40,151
5th	Per Hildebrand	$27,587
6th	Nicholas Derke	$19,404

=== Event #23: $10,000 No Limit 2-7 Lowball Draw Championship ===
- 3-Day Event: June 10–12
- Number of Entries: 95
- Total Prize Pool: $893,000
- Number of Payouts: 15
- Winning Hand: 9-8-7-6-2

Final Table
Place	Name	Prize
1st	Brian Rast (1/4)	$259,670
2nd	Mike Wattel (0/2)	$160,489
3rd	Dario Sammartino	$114,023
4th	James Alexander	$81,986
5th	Shawn Sheikhan	$59,669
6th	Doyle Brunson* (0/10)	$43,963
7th	John Hennigan (0/4)	$32,796

=== Event #24: $2,620 The Marathon No Limit Hold'em ===
- 5-Day Event: June 11–15
- Number of Entries: 1,637
- Total Prize Pool: $3,860,046
- Number of Payouts: 246
- Winning Hand: A♣ K♥

Final Table
Place	Name	Prize
1st	Michael Addamo (1/1)	$653,581
2nd	Mark Sleet	$403,870
3rd	Bart Lybaert	$290,315
4th	Taylor Paur (0/1)	$210,995
5th	Martin Jacobson (0/1)	$155,062
6th	Ying Chan	$115,244
7th	Anton Morgenstern	$86,631
8th	Cate Hall	$65,875
9th	Ihar Soika	$50,678

=== Event #25: $1,500 Seven Card Stud Hi-Lo 8 or Better ===
- 3-Day Event: June 11–13
- Number of Entries: 596
- Total Prize Pool: $804,600
- Number of Payouts: 90
- Winning Hand: 4♣ 3♥ 6♠ 5♦ 2♥ 3♦ 5♥

Final Table
Place	Name	Prize
1st	Benjamin Dobson (1/1)	$173,528
2nd	Tim Finne	$107,243
3rd	Jesse Martin (0/2)	$74,324
4th	Richard Monroe	$52,359
5th	Tom McCormick	$37,504
6th	James Nelson	$27,321
7th	Georgios Sotiropoulos (0/1)	$20,248
8th	Peter Brownstein	$15,271

=== Event #26: $1,000 Pot Limit Omaha ===
- 3-Day Event: June 12–14
- Number of Entries: 986
- Total Prize Pool: $887,400
- Number of Payouts: 148
- Winning Hand: A♦ 7♦ 7♣ 4♠

Final Table
Place	Name	Prize
1st	Filippos Stavrakis (1/1)	$169,842
2nd	Jordan Siegel	$104,924
3rd	Felipe Ramos	$73,989
4th	Clinton Monfort	$52,879
5th	Peter Klein	$38,309
6th	Pascal Damois	$28,137
7th	Thayer Rasmussen	$20,957
8th	Georgios Karavokyris	$15,832
9th	Robert Cowen	$12,133

=== Event #27: $10,000 H.O.R.S.E. ===
- 3-Day Event: June 12–14
- Number of Entries: 166
- Total Prize Pool: $1,560,400
- Number of Payouts: 25
- Winning Hand: J♣ 3♥ (Limit Hold'em)

Final Table
Place	Name	Prize
1st	John Hennigan (1/5)	$414,692
2nd	David "Bakes" Baker (0/2)	$256,297
3rd	Lee Salem	$179,216
4th	Iraj Parvizi	$127,724
5th	Randy Ohel (0/1)	$92,808
6th	Albert Daher	$68,783
7th	Daniel Zack	$52,016
8th	Michael Noori	$40,155

=== Event #28: $3,000 No Limit Hold'em 6-Handed ===
- 4-Day Event: June 13–16
- Number of Entries: 868
- Total Prize Pool: $2,343,600
- Number of Payouts: 131
- Winning Hand: A♠ 8♥

Final Table
Place	Name	Prize
1st	Gal Yifrach (1/1)	$461,798
2nd	James Mackey (0/1)	$285,377
3rd	Gary Hasson	$193,716
4th	Aaron Mermelstein	$133,731
5th	Darren Rabinowitz	$93,917
6th	Ana Marquez	$67,116

=== Event #29: $1,500 Limit 2-7 Lowball Triple Draw ===
- 3-Day Event: June 13–15
- Number of Entries: 356
- Total Prize Pool: $480,600
- Number of Payouts: 54
- Winning Hand: 9-6-5-3-2

Final Table
Place	Name	Prize
1st	Hanh Tran (1/1)	$117,282
2nd	Oscar Johansson	$72,471
3rd	David Prociak (0/1)	$46,729
4th	Cody Wagner	$30,926
5th	Brian Hastings (0/3)	$21,021
6th	Yong Wang	$14,687

=== Event #30: $1,500 Pot Limit Omaha ===
- 3-Day Event: June 14–16
- Number of Entries: 799
- Total Prize Pool: $1,078,650
- Number of Payouts: 120
- Winning Hand: Q♥ Q♣ 8♦ 3♠

Final Table
Place	Name	Prize
1st	Ryan Bambrick (1/1)	$217,123
2nd	Sampo Ryynanen	$134,138
3rd	Tim McDermott	$93,639
4th	Phil Riley	$66,342
5th	Jared Ingles	$47,713
6th	Jody Fayant	$34,843
7th	Danny Woolard	$25,841
8th	Randy White	$19,469
9th	Pushpinder Singh	$14,904

=== Event #31: $1,500 Seven Card Stud ===
- 3-Day Event: June 14–16
- Number of Entries: 310
- Total Prize Pool: $418,500
- Number of Payouts: 47
- Winning Hand: 10♣ 9♠ A♥ 4♣ 2♦ 10♦ J♦

Final Table
Place	Name	Prize
1st	Steven Albini (1/1)	$105,629
2nd	Jeff Lisandro (0/6)	$65,282
3rd	Katherine Fleck	$43,765
4th	Chris Ferguson (0/6)	$29,999
5th	Frankie O'Dell (0/2)	$21,035
6th	Paul Sexton	$15,096
7th	Michael Moore (0/1)	$11,095
8th	Esther Rossi	$8,355

=== Event #32: $1,000 Seniors No Limit Hold'em ===
- 4-Day Event: June 15–18
- Number of Entries: 5,919
- Total Prize Pool: $5,327,100
- Number of Payouts: 888
- Winning Hand: K♦ 8♦

Final Table
Place	Name	Prize
1st	Matthew Davis (1/1)	$662,983
2nd	Bill Stabler	$409,456
3rd	Scott Hamilton-Hill	$303,859
4th	Gary Friedlander	$227,111
5th	Bill Bennett (0/1)	$170,973
6th	Rachel Delatorre	$129,648
7th	Frank Berry	$99,032
8th	Joseph Schulman	$76,204
9th	Thad Smith	$59,074

=== Event #33: $50,000 Poker Players Championship ===
- 5-Day Event: June 15–19
- Number of Entries: 87
- Total Prize Pool: $4,176,000
- Number of Payouts: 14
- Winning Hand: 9♥ 8♥ (No Limit Hold'em)

Final Table
Place	Name	Prize
1st	Michael Mizrachi (1/4)	$1,239,126
2nd	John Hennigan (1/5)	$765,837
3rd	Dan Smith	$521,782
4th	Mike Leah (0/1)	$364,197
5th	Benny Glaser (0/3)	$260,578
6th	Aaron Katz (0/1)	$191,234

=== Event #34: $1,000 Double Stack No Limit Hold'em ===
- 6-Day Event: June 16–21
- Number of Entries: 5,700
- Total Prize Pool: $5,130,000
- Number of Payouts: 855
- Winning Hand: K♥ Q♥

Final Table
Place	Name	Prize
1st	Robert Peacock (1/1)	$644,224
2nd	Nicholas Salimbene	$397,908
3rd	Joshua Turner	$294,760
4th	Jacky Wong	$219,952
5th	Ralph Wong	$165,342
6th	Daniel Eichhorn	$125,215
7th	James Ostrowski	$95,538
8th	Pfizer Jordan	$73,446
9th	Takao Shizumi	$56,891

=== Event #35: $1,500 Mixed Omaha ===
- 3-Day Event: June 16–18
- Number of Entries: 773
- Total Prize Pool: $1,043,550
- Number of Payouts: 116
- Winning Hand: K♠ K♣ J♣ 9♠

Final Table
Place	Name	Prize
1st	Yueqi Zhu (1/1)	$211,781
2nd	Gabriel Ramos	$130,850
3rd	Carol Fuchs (0/1)	$89,488
4th	Matthew Gregoire	$62,226
5th	Jon Turner	$44,007
6th	Peter Neff	$31,662
7th	Ryan Hughes (0/2)	$23,182
8th	Nathan Gamble (0/1)	$17,279

=== Event #36: $1,000 Super Seniors No Limit Hold'em ===
- 4-Day Event: June 17–20
- Number of Entries: 2,191
- Total Prize Pool: $1,971,900
- Number of Payouts: 329
- Winning Hand: 8♠ 8♦

Final Table
Place	Name	Prize
1st	Farhintaj Bonyadi (1/1)	$311,451
2nd	Robert Beach	$192,397
3rd	Paul W. Lee	$140,273
4th	Linda Iwaniak	$103,215
5th	Russell Sutton	$76,655
6th	Alan Denkenson	$57,465
7th	Charles Thompson	$43,489
8th	Neil Henley	$33,227
9th	Bill Fogel	$25,633

=== Event #37: $1,500 No Limit Hold'em ===
- 4-Day Event: June 18–21
- Number of Entries: 1,330
- Total Prize Pool: $1,795,500
- Number of Payouts: 200
- Winning Hand: A♠ J♥

Final Table
Place	Name	Prize
1st	Eric Baldwin (1/2)	$319,580
2nd	Ian Steinman	$197,461
3rd	Enrico Rudelitz	$140,957
4th	Aaron Massey	$101,819
5th	Robert Georato	$74,434
6th	Michael Finstein	$55,077
7th	Stephen Song	$41,257
8th	Gilsoo Kim	$31,290
9th	Mathew Moore	$24,032

=== Event #38: $10,000 Seven Card Stud Championship ===
- 3-Day Event: June 18–20
- Number of Entries: 83
- Total Prize Pool: $780,200
- Number of Payouts: 13
- Winning Hand: 5♣ 2♥ Q♠ 7♥ A♠ 9♥ 9♠

Final Table
Place	Name	Prize
1st	Yaniv Birman (1/1)	$236,238
2nd	Jesse Martin (0/2)	$146,006
3rd	Ben Yu (0/2)	$99,540
4th	Lee Salem	$69,928
5th	Matt Grapenthien (0/1)	$50,669
6th	James Obst (0/1)	$37,904
7th	Joseph Cappello	$29,306
8th	Lars Gronning	$23,443

=== Event #39: $1,500 No Limit Hold'em Shootout ===
- 3-Day Event: June 19–21
- Number of Entries: 908
- Total Prize Pool: $1,225,800
- Number of Payouts: 100
- Winning Hand: 9♦ 5♣

Final Table
Place	Name	Prize
1st	Preston Lee (1/1)	$236,498
2nd	Corey Dodd	$146,146
3rd	Anthony Reategui (0/1)	$105,307
4th	Dylan Linde	$76,829
5th	Jesse Kertland	$56,763
6th	Young Phan	$42,476
7th	Royce Matheson	$32,198
8th	Alexander Lakhov	$24,728
9th	Bas De Laat	$19,245
10th	Endrit Geci	$15,180

=== Event #40: $2,500 Mixed Big Bet ===
- 3-Day Event: June 19–21
- Number of Entries: 205
- Total Prize Pool: $461,250
- Number of Payouts: 31
- Winning Hand: 9♠ 9♣ 6♦ 8♥ 4♠ (Big O)

Final Table
Place	Name	Prize
1st	Scott Bohlman (1/1)	$122,138
2nd	Ryan Hughes (0/2)	$75,477
3rd	Daniel Weinman	$49,541
4th	Aaron Rogers	$33,344
5th	Marcel Vonk (0/1)	$23,028
6th	Jeremy Harkin (1/1)	$16,329

=== Event #41: $1,500 Limit Hold'em ===
- 3-Day Event: June 20–22
- Number of Entries: 596
- Total Prize Pool: $804,600
- Number of Payouts: 90
- Winning Hand: 10♠ 7♦

Final Table
Place	Name	Prize
1st	Robert Nehorayan (1/1)	$173,568
2nd	Kevin Song (0/1)	$107,242
3rd	David Gee	$73,860
4th	Terricita Gutierrez	$51,733
5th	Michael Jex	$36,860
6th	Brad Albrinck	$26,725
7th	Oleg Chebotarev	$19,723
8th	Matt Russell	$14,820
9th	Matt Woodward	$11,343

=== Event #42: $25,000 Pot Limit Omaha High Roller ===
- 4-Day Event: June 20–23
- Number of Entries: 230
- Total Prize Pool: $5,462,500
- Number of Payouts: 35
- Winning Hand: A♠ A♥ 9♠ 8♣

Final Table
Place	Name	Prize
1st	Shaun Deeb (1/3)	$1,402,683
2nd	Ben Yu (0/2)	$866,924
3rd	Scotty Nguyen* (0/5)	$592,875
4th	James Calderaro (0/1)	$414,134
5th	Jason Koon	$295,606
6th	Ryan Tosoc	$215,718
7th	David Benyamine (0/1)	$161,020
8th	Bogdan Capitan	$123,004

=== Event #43: $2,500 No Limit Hold'em ===
- 4-Day Event: June 21–24
- Number of Entries: 1,248
- Total Prize Pool: $2,808,000
- Number of Payouts: 188
- Winning Hand: K♣ Q♠

Final Table
Place	Name	Prize
1st	Timur Margolin (1/1)	$507,274
2nd	Ismael Bojang	$313,444
3rd	Michael Marder	$223,564
4th	Chris Ferguson (0/6)	$161,371
5th	Dylan Linde	$117,894
6th	Ryan Laplante (0/1)	$87,189
7th	Jeff Hakim	$65,284
8th	Andre Haneberg	$49,498
9th	Josh Bergman	$38,009

=== Event #44: $10,000 Limit 2-7 Lowball Triple Draw Championship ===
- 3-Day Event: June 21–23
- Number of Entries: 109
- Total Prize Pool: $1,024,600
- Number of Payouts: 17
- Winning Hand: 7-6-5-4-2

Final Table
Place	Name	Prize
1st	Nicholas Seiken (1/1)	$287,987
2nd	Randy Ohel (0/1)	$177,992
3rd	Kristijonas Andrulis	$125,190
4th	Farzad Bonyadi (0/3)	$89,078
5th	Matt Glantz	$64,131
6th	Jason Gray	$46,722

=== Event #45: $1,000 Big Blind Antes No Limit Hold'em ===
- 2-Day Event: June 22–23
- Number of Entries: 1,712
- Total Prize Pool: $1,540,800
- Number of Payouts: 257
- Winning Hand: Q♦ 6♦

Final Table
Place	Name	Prize
1st	Mario Prats (1/1)	$258,255
2nd	Matthew Hunt	$159,532
3rd	Sebastian Dornbracht	$114,909
4th	Michael Wang (0/1)	$83,663
5th	Mark Schluter	$61,580
6th	Gregory Worner	$45,828
7th	D.J. MacKinnon	$34,486
8th	Martin Staszko	$26,245
9th	Lander Lijo	$20,202

=== Event #46: $2,500 Mixed Omaha/Seven Card Stud Hi-Lo 8 or Better ===
- 3-Day Event: June 22–24
- Number of Entries: 402
- Total Prize Pool: $904,500
- Number of Payouts: 61
- Winning Hand: 8♦ 7♣ 6♦ 4♦

Final Table
Place	Name	Prize
1st	David Brookshire (1/1)	$214,291
2nd	Brendan Taylor (0/1)	$132,443
3rd	Daniel Ospina (1/1)	$89,968
4th	Ian Shaw	$62,331
5th	Tyler Groth (0/1)	$44,059
6th	Hani Awad (0/1)	$31,789
7th	William Shelton	$23,421
8th	Eric Rodawig (0/1)	$17,628

=== Event #47: $565 WSOP.com Online Pot Limit Omaha 6-Handed ===
- 1-Day Event: June 22
- Number of Entries: 1,223
- Total Prize Pool: $635,960
- Number of Payouts: 99
- Winning Hand: 9♥ 8♦ 5♠ 3♦

Final Table
Place	Name	Prize
1st	Matthew Mendez (1/1)	$135,078
2nd	Marton Czuczor	$82,866
3rd	Anthony Zinno (0/1)	$57,300
4th	Alex Smith	$40,256
5th	Ankush Mandavia (0/1)	$28,745
6th	Ao Chen	$20,859

=== Event #48: $1,500 Monster Stack No Limit Hold'em ===
- 5-Day Event: June 23–27
- Number of Entries: 6,260
- Total Prize Pool: $8,451,000
- Number of Payouts: 939
- Winning Hand: A♦ K♣

Final Table
Place	Name	Prize
1st	Tommy Nguyen (1/1)	$1,037,451
2nd	James Carroll	$640,916
3rd	Frank Rusnak	$475,212
4th	Chris Chong	$354,903
5th	Daniel Corbett	$266,987
6th	Michael Benko	$202,327
7th	Shyam Srinivasan	$154,463
8th	Harald Sammer	$118,802
9th	Rittie Chuaprasert	$92,061

=== Event #49: $10,000 Pot Limit Omaha 8-Handed Championship ===
- 4-Day Event: June 23–26
- Number of Entries: 476
- Total Prize Pool: $4,474,400
- Number of Payouts: 72
- Winning Hand: A♣ A♦ 3♦ 2♥

Final Table
Place	Name	Prize
1st	Loren Klein (1/3)	$1,018,336
2nd	Rep Porter (0/3)	$629,378
3rd	Brandon Shack-Harris (0/2)	$433,259
4th	Jerry Wong	$303,491
5th	Ryan Hughes (0/2)	$216,391
6th	Scott Bohlman (1/1)	$157,097
7th	Mike Leah (0/1)	$116,166
8th	Alexey Makarov	$87,522

=== Event #50: $1,500 Razz ===
- 3-Day Event: June 24–26
- Number of Entries: 389
- Total Prize Pool: $525,150
- Number of Payouts: 59
- Winning Hand: 4-3-Q-9-7-6-Q

Final Table
Place	Name	Prize
1st	Jay Kwon (1/1)	$125,431
2nd	Dzmitry Urbanovich	$77,526
3rd	Adam Owen	$52,536
4th	Michael McKenna	$36,324
5th	Kevin Iacofano	$25,637
6th	Thomas Taylor	$18,477
7th	Jeff Mitseff	$13,605
8th	Jeanne David	$10,240

=== Event #51: $1,500 No Limit Hold'em Bounty ===
- 4-Day Event: June 25–28
- Number of Entries: 1,983
- Total Prize Pool: $2,677,050
- Number of Payouts: 298
- Winning Hand: 10♣ 7♥

Final Table
Place	Name	Prize
1st	Ryan Leng (1/1)	$272,765
2nd	Ranno Sootla	$168,464
3rd	Jay Farber	$121,932
4th	Christian Nolte	$89,151
5th	Javier Gomez	$65,851
6th	Russell Rosenblum	$49,146
7th	John Gulino	$37,063
8th	Mark Mazza	$28,247
9th	Mikhail Semin	$21,759

=== Event #52: $10,000 Limit Hold'em Championship ===
- 3-Day Event: June 25–27
- Number of Entries: 114
- Total Prize Pool: $1,071,600
- Number of Payouts: 18
- Winning Hand: K♣ Q♥

Final Table
Place	Name	Prize
1st	Scott Seiver (1/2)	$296,222
2nd	Matt Szymaszek	$183,081
3rd	Anthony Zinno (0/1)	$129,186
4th	Christopher Chung	$93,009
5th	Matt Glantz	$68,352
6th	Philip Cordano	$51,296
7th	Daniel Zack	$39,329
8th	Michael Moore (0/1)	$30,821
9th	Ken Deng	$24,700

=== Event #53: $1,500 Pot Limit Omaha Hi-Lo 8 or Better ===
- 3-Day Event: June 26–28
- Number of Entries: 935
- Total Prize Pool: $1,262,250
- Number of Payouts: 141
- Winning Hand: A♦ Q♥ 5♥ 3♦

Final Table
Place	Name	Prize
1st	Joey Couden (1/1)	$244,370
2nd	Bruno Fitoussi	$150,990
3rd	Eli Elezra (0/3)	$106,183
4th	Mike Matusow (0/4)	$75,708
5th	Christopher Conrad	$54,738
6th	Kim Kallman	$40,141
7th	Dustin Pattinson	$29,862
8th	Gregory Jamison	$22,541
9th	Daniel Negreanu* (0/6)	$17,268

=== Event #54: $3,000 Big Blind Antes No Limit Hold'em ===
- 4-Day Event: June 26–29
- Number of Entries: 1,020
- Total Prize Pool: $2,754,000
- Number of Payouts: 153
- Winning Hand: K♠ 10♠

Final Table
Place	Name	Prize
1st	Diogo Veiga (1/1)	$522,715
2nd	Barry Hutter (0/1)	$323,019
3rd	Radoslav Stoyanov	$228,241
4th	Jonathan Abdellatif	$163,404
5th	Tom McCormick	$118,552
6th	David Yan	$87,179
7th	Anna Antimony	$64,991
8th	Cathal Shine	$49,126
9th	Todd Ivens	$37,660

=== Event #55: $1,000 Tag Team No Limit Hold'em ===
- 3-Day Event: June 27–29
- Number of Entries: 1,032
- Total Prize Pool: $928,800
- Number of Payouts: 155
- Winning Hand: 2♥ 2♦

Final Table
Place	Name	Prize
1st	Nikita Luther (1/1); Giuseppe Pantaleo (1/1)	$175,805
2nd	Kazuki Ikeuchi; Hiroki Iwata; Sho Mori	$108,608
3rd	Manig Löser; Joelle Parenteau; Daniel Weinand	$76,797
4th	Joanne Milburn; Megan Milburn; Alex Rocha	$55,016
5th	Carlos Caputo; Gabriel Neto	$39,936
6th	Ao Chen; Adam Lamphere; Yijie Zhang	$29,380
7th	Cord Garcia (0/1); Salah Levy; Frank Mariani	$21,910
8th	Bienvenido Caballero; Bon Koo	$16,565
9th	Loni Harwood (0/2); Kelly Minkin; Haixia Zhang (0/1)	$12,700

=== Event #56: $10,000 Razz Championship ===
- 4-Day Event: June 27–30
- Number of Entries: 119
- Total Prize Pool: $1,118,600
- Number of Payouts: 18
- Winning Hand: 3-2-2-7-4-Q-5

Final Table
Place	Name	Prize
1st	Calvin Anderson (1/2)	$309,220
2nd	Frank Kassela (0/3)	$191,111
3rd	Julien Martini (1/1)	$134,587
4th	Mike Leah (0/1)	$96,744
5th	Jerry Wong	$71,014
6th	Alex Balandin	$53,253
7th	John Hennigan (1/5)	$40,817
8th	Dzmitry Urbanovich	$31,992

=== Event #57: $1,000/$10,000 Ladies No Limit Hold'em Championship ===
- 3-Day Event: June 28–30
- Number of Entries: 696
- Total Prize Pool: $626,400
- Number of Payouts: 105
- Winning Hand: 8♥ 5♥

Final Table
Place	Name	Prize
1st	Jessica Dawley (1/1)	$130,230
2nd	Jill Pike	$80,444
3rd	Lisa Fong	$55,812
4th	Mesha James	$39,334
5th	Jacqueline Burkhart	$28,167
6th	Tara Cain	$20,499
7th	Weiyi Mo	$15,167
8th	Molly Mossey	$11,411
9th	Tara Snow	$8,732

=== Event #58: $5,000 No Limit Hold'em 6-Handed ===
- 4-Day Event: June 28-July 1
- Number of Entries: 621
- Total Prize Pool: $2,887,650
- Number of Payouts: 94
- Winning Hand: Q♠ Q♦

Final Table
Place	Name	Prize
1st	Jean-Robert Bellande (1/1)	$616,302
2nd	Dean Lyall	$380,895
3rd	Andrew Graham	$254,684
4th	Tay Nguyen	$173,598
5th	Eric Blair	$120,669
6th	Kacper Pyzara	$85,570

=== Event #59: $1,000 No Limit Hold'em Super Turbo Bounty ===
- 1-Day Event: June 29
- Number of Entries: 2,065
- Total Prize Pool: $1,858,500
- Number of Payouts: 310
- Winning Hand: K♦ J♣

Final Table
Place	Name	Prize
1st	Mike Takayama (1/1)	$198,568
2nd	Lorenc Puka	$122,627
3rd	Matthew Smith	$88,938
4th	Steve Jelinek (0/1)	$65,145
5th	Spencer Baker	$48,196
6th	Kavish Shabbir	$36,019
7th	Elizabeth Montizanti	$27,193
8th	Jack Duong (0/1)	$20,743
9th	Oliver Rusing	$15,988

=== Event #60: $10,000 Pot Limit Omaha Hi-Lo 8 or Better Championship ===
- 3-Day Event: June 29-July 1
- Number of Entries: 237
- Total Prize Pool: $2,227,800
- Number of Payouts: 36
- Winning Hand: A♦ 8♦ 7♥ 4♦

Final Table
Place	Name	Prize
1st	Phil Galfond (1/3)	$567,788
2nd	Michael McKenna	$350,922
3rd	Ali Abduljabbar	$240,497
4th	Chad Power	$168,275
5th	Chris Lee (0/1)	$120,263
6th	Marco Johnson (0/2)	$87,830
7th	David "ODB" Baker (0/1)	$65,579
8th	Chase Steely	$50,086

=== Event #61: $1,000 WSOP.com Online No Limit Hold'em Championship ===
- 1-Day Event: June 29
- Number of Entries: 1,635
- Total Prize Pool: $1,553,250
- Number of Payouts: 180
- Winning Hand: A♠ J♦

Final Table
Place	Name	Prize
1st	Ryan Tosoc (1/1)	$283,778
2nd	Anthony Maio	$175,206
3rd	Joel Feldman	$124,570
4th	James Robinson	$89,777
5th	Justin Lapka	$65,391
6th	Markus Gonsalves	$48,306
7th	Russell Powers	$36,190
8th	Aurelien Guiglini	$27,337
9th	Aditya Sushant (0/1)	$20,968

=== Event #62: $888 Crazy Eights No Limit Hold-em ===
- 5-Day Event: June 30-July 5
- Number of Entries: 8,598
- Total Prize Pool: $6,871,521
- Number of Payouts: 1,218
- Winning Hand: 9♠ 9♦

Final Table
Place	Name	Prize
1st	Galen Hall (1/1)	$888,888
2nd	Eduards Kudrjavcevs	$476,888
3rd	Niels Herregodts	$355,888
4th	Andrey Zaichenko (0/1)	$266,888
5th	Alexander Kuzmin	$201,888
6th	Jeremiah Miesen	$153,888
7th	Martin Stausholm	$117,888
8th	Philip Tom (0/1)	$90,888

=== Event #63: $3,200 WSOP.com Online No Limit Hold'em High Roller ===
- 1-Day Event: June 30
- Number of Entries: 480
- Total Prize Pool: $1,459,200
- Number of Payouts: 63
- Winning Hand: 6♣ 6♠

Final Table
Place	Name	Prize
1st	Chance Kornuth (1/2)	$341,598
2nd	David Goodman	$212,021
3rd	Tim Nuter	$144,168
4th	Noah Bronstein	$99,809
5th	Frank Crivello	$70,625
6th	Taylor Black	$50,926
7th	Justin Liberto (0/1)	$37,355
8th	Jonas Mackoff	$28,016
9th	Pete Chen	$21,596

=== Event #64: $10,000 Seven Card Stud Hi-Lo 8 or Better Championship ===
- 3-Day Event: July 1–3
- Number of Entries: 141
- Total Prize Pool: $1,325,400
- Number of Payouts: 22
- Winning Hand: 3♣ J♦ 4♦ 7♠ 7♥ 7♦ 3♦

Final Table
Place	Name	Prize
1st	Dan Matsuzuki (1/1)	$364,387
2nd	Scott Bohlman (1/1)	$225,210
3rd	Ken Aldridge (0/1)	$154,648
4th	Chris Vitch (0/2)	$108,739
5th	Daham Wang	$78,337
6th	Jerry Wong	$57,855
7th	Bryce Yockey (0/1)	$43,833
8th	Joseph Michael	$34,089

=== Event #65: $10,000 No Limit Hold'em Main Event ===
- 13-Day Event: July 2–14
- Number of Entries: 7,874
- Total Prize Pool: $74,015,600
- Number of Payouts: 1,182
- Winning Hand: K♣ J♣

Final Table
Place	Name	Prize
1st	John Cynn (1/1)	$8,800,000
2nd	Tony Miles	$5,000,000
3rd	Michael Dyer	$3,750,000
4th	Nicolas Manion	$2,825,000
5th	Joe Cada (1/3)	$2,150,000
6th	Aram Zobian	$1,800,000
7th	Alex Lynskey	$1,500,000
8th	Artem Metalidi	$1,250,000
9th	Antoine Labat	$1,000,000

=== Event #66: $1,500 No Limit Hold'em ===
- 4-Day Event: July 5–8
- Number of Entries: 1,351
- Total Prize Pool: $1,823,850
- Number of Payouts: 203
- Winning Hand: A♦ 7♥

Final Table
Place	Name	Prize
1st	Longsheng Tan (1/1)	$323,472
2nd	Lanny Levine	$199,862
3rd	Jayaram Kovoorchathoth	$142,785
4th	Trey Brabham	$103,212
5th	Adam Laskey	$75,497
6th	Stephen Bierman	$55,892
7th	John Pannucci	$41,884
8th	Georgios Tavoularis	$31,775
9th	Jason Paradis	$24,409

=== Event #67: $1,500 Pot Limit Omaha Bounty ===
- 3-Day Event: July 6–8
- Number of Entries: 833
- Total Prize Pool: $708,050
- Number of Payouts: 125
- Winning Hand: K♠ Q♣ Q♥ 9♦

Final Table
Place	Name	Prize
1st	Anderson Ireland (1/1)	$141,161
2nd	Matt O'Donnell (0/1)	$87,198
3rd	Joon Park	$61,013
4th	Michal Maryska	$43,313
5th	Hai Chu	$31,203
6th	Andrew Holland	$22,816
7th	Jonathan Thomas	$16,937
8th	Harry Pozefsky	$12,767
9th	Jameson Painter	$9,776

=== Event #68: $1,000 + 111 The Little One for One Drop No Limit Hold'em ===
- 5-Day Event: July 7–11
- Number of Entries: 4,732
- Total Prize Pool: $4,258,800
- Number of Payouts: 710
- Winning Hand: Q♠ 10♠

Final Table
Place	Name	Prize
1st	Guoliang Wei (1/1)	$559,332
2nd	Francois Tosques	$345,415
3rd	Christopher Staats	$254,580
4th	Sung Joo Hyun	$189,098
5th	Richard Douglas	$141,565
6th	Jon Hoellein	$106,822
7th	Renato Kaneoya	$81,251
8th	Erwann Pecheux	$62,299
9th	Lester Edoc	$48,157

=== Event #69: $3,000 Pot Limit Omaha 6-Handed ===
- 3-Day Event: July 8–10
- Number of Entries: 901
- Total Prize Pool: $2,432,700
- Number of Payouts: 136
- Winning Hand: K♥ 10♦ 10♥ 9♥

Final Table
Place	Name	Prize
1st	Ronald Keijzer (1/1)	$475,033
2nd	Romain Lewis	$293,553
3rd	Scott Bohlman (1/1)	$199,572
4th	Mohammad Abedi	$137,954
5th	James Chen	$96,987
6th	Ryan Lenaghan	$69,369

=== Event #70: $3,000 Limit Hold'em 6-Handed ===
- 3-Day Event: July 9–11
- Number of Entries: 221
- Total Prize Pool: $596,700
- Number of Payouts: 34
- Winning Hand: 4♥ 4♣

Final Table
Place	Name	Prize
1st	Yaser Al-Keliddar (1/1)	$154,338
2nd	Juha Helppi	$95,380
3rd	Justin Thurlow	$62,187
4th	Andrew Yip	$41,665
5th	Mike Schneider	$28,708
6th	Barry Greenstein* (0/3)	$20,358

=== Event #71: $5,000 No Limit Hold'em ===
- 2-Day Event: July 10–11
- Number of Entries: 452
- Total Prize Pool: $2,101,800
- Number of Payouts: 68
- Winning Hand: 3♠ 3♥

Final Table
Place	Name	Prize
1st	Phil Hellmuth* (1/15)	$485,082
2nd	Steven Wolansky (0/2)	$299,807
3rd	Alan Sternberg	$204,789
4th	Aliaksei Boika	$142,458
5th	Ken Fishman	$100,956
6th	Matt Glantz	$72,911
7th	Paul Hoefer (0/1)	$53,682
8th	Ralph Wong	$40,309
9th	Eric Hicks	$30,881

=== Event #72: $1,500 Mixed No Limit Hold'em/Pot Limit Omaha 8-Handed ===
- 3-Day Event: July 10–12
- Number of Entries: 707
- Total Prize Pool: $954,450
- Number of Payouts: 107
- Winning Hand: A♦ Q♥

Final Table
Place	Name	Prize
1st	Jordan Polk (1/1)	$197,461
2nd	Fernando Brito	$122,032
3rd	Jesse Vilchez	$85,320
4th	Dan Matsuzuki (1/1)	$60,556
5th	Samuel Welbourne	$43,641
6th	Ryan Leng (1/1)	$31,942
7th	Kevin Iacofano	$23,751
8th	Alexander Ziskin (0/1)	$17,945

=== Event #73: $1,000 Double Stack No Limit Hold'em ===
- 2-Day Event: July 11–12
- Number of Entries: 1,221
- Total Prize Pool: $1,098,900
- Number of Payouts: 184
- Winning Hand: 8♣ 7♣

Final Table
Place	Name	Prize
1st	Denis Timofeev (1/1)	$199,586
2nd	Leo Margets	$123,297
3rd	Evan Lipshultz	$87,831
4th	Ben Yu (0/2)	$63,327
5th	Justin Young	$46,221
6th	Juan Carlos Martin	$34,157
7th	Hien Nguyen	$25,560
8th	Thiago Nishijima (0/1)	$19,371
9th	Jason Johnson	$14,871

=== Event #74: $10,000 Big Blind Antes No Limit Hold'em 6-Handed Championship ===
- 3-Day Event: July 11–13
- Number of Entries: 355
- Total Prize Pool: $3,337,000
- Number of Payouts: 54
- Winning Hand: K♥ 4♣

Final Table
Place	Name	Prize
1st	Shaun Deeb (2/4)	$814,179
2nd	Paul Volpe (1/3)	$503,196
3rd	Romain Lewis	$325,842
4th	Bin Duan	$216,370
5th	Scott Margereson	$147,431
6th	John Andress	$103,152

=== Event #75: $1,500 The Closer No Limit Hold'em ===
- 4-Day Event: July 12–15
- Number of Entries: 3,120
- Total Prize Pool: $4,212,000
- Number of Payouts: 457
- Winning Hand: 10♥ 10♦

Final Table
Place	Name	Prize
1st	Joe Cada (2/4)	$612,886
2nd	Paawan Bansal	$378,765
3rd	Jeffrey Tanouye	$278,774
4th	Richard Ali	$206,813
5th	Eric Afriat	$154,660
6th	Richard Cox	$116,595
7th	Jimmy Poper	$88,615
8th	Brayden Gazlay	$67,904
9th	Joshua Turner	$52,465

=== Event #76: $3,000 H.O.R.S.E. ===
- 3-Day Event: July 12–14
- Number of Entries: 354
- Total Prize Pool: $955,800
- Number of Payouts: 54
- Winning Hand: A♥ 9♥ 5♣ 2♦ (Omaha Hi-Lo)

Final Table
Place	Name	Prize
1st	Brian Hastings (1/4)	$233,202
2nd	Andrew Brown (0/1)	$144,128
3rd	Tim Marsters	$97,340
4th	Jeff Madsen (0/4)	$67,121
5th	Lee Markholt	$47,275
6th	Hye Park	$34,027
7th	Dutch Boyd (0/3)	$25,040
8th	Bruno Fitoussi	$18,849

=== Event #77: $50,000 Big Blind Ante No Limit Hold'em High Roller ===
- 2-Day Event: July 13–14
- Number of Entries: 128
- Total Prize Pool: $6,144,000
- Number of Payouts: 20
- Winning Hand: K♠ Q♥

Final Table
Place	Name	Prize
1st	Ben Yu (1/3)	$1,650,773
2nd	Sean Winter	$1,020,253
3rd	Nick Petrangelo (1/2)	$720,103
4th	Isaac Haxton	$518,882
5th	Igor Kurganov (0/1)	$381,874
6th	Manig Löser	$287,174
7th	John Racener (0/1)	$220,777
8th	Jake Schindler	$173,604

=== Event #78: $1,000,000 The Big One for One Drop No Limit Hold'em ===
- 3-Day Event: July 15–17
- Number of Entries: 27
- Total Prize Pool: $24,840,000
- Number of Payouts: 5
- Winning Hand: A♠ J♦

Final Table
Place	Name	Prize
1st	Justin Bonomo (2/3)	$10,000,000
2nd	Fedor Holz (0/1)	$6,000,000
3rd	Dan Smith	$4,000,000
4th	Rick Salomon	$2,840,000
5th	Byron Kaverman (0/1)	$2,000,000
