= World Poker Tour season 15 results =

Below are the results for season 15 (XV) of the World Poker Tour (2016–17).

A notable occurrence happened at the 14th event of the season, the WPT Playground, which saw Ema Zajmović become the first woman to win an open WPT event.

== Results ==
=== Canadian Spring Championship ===
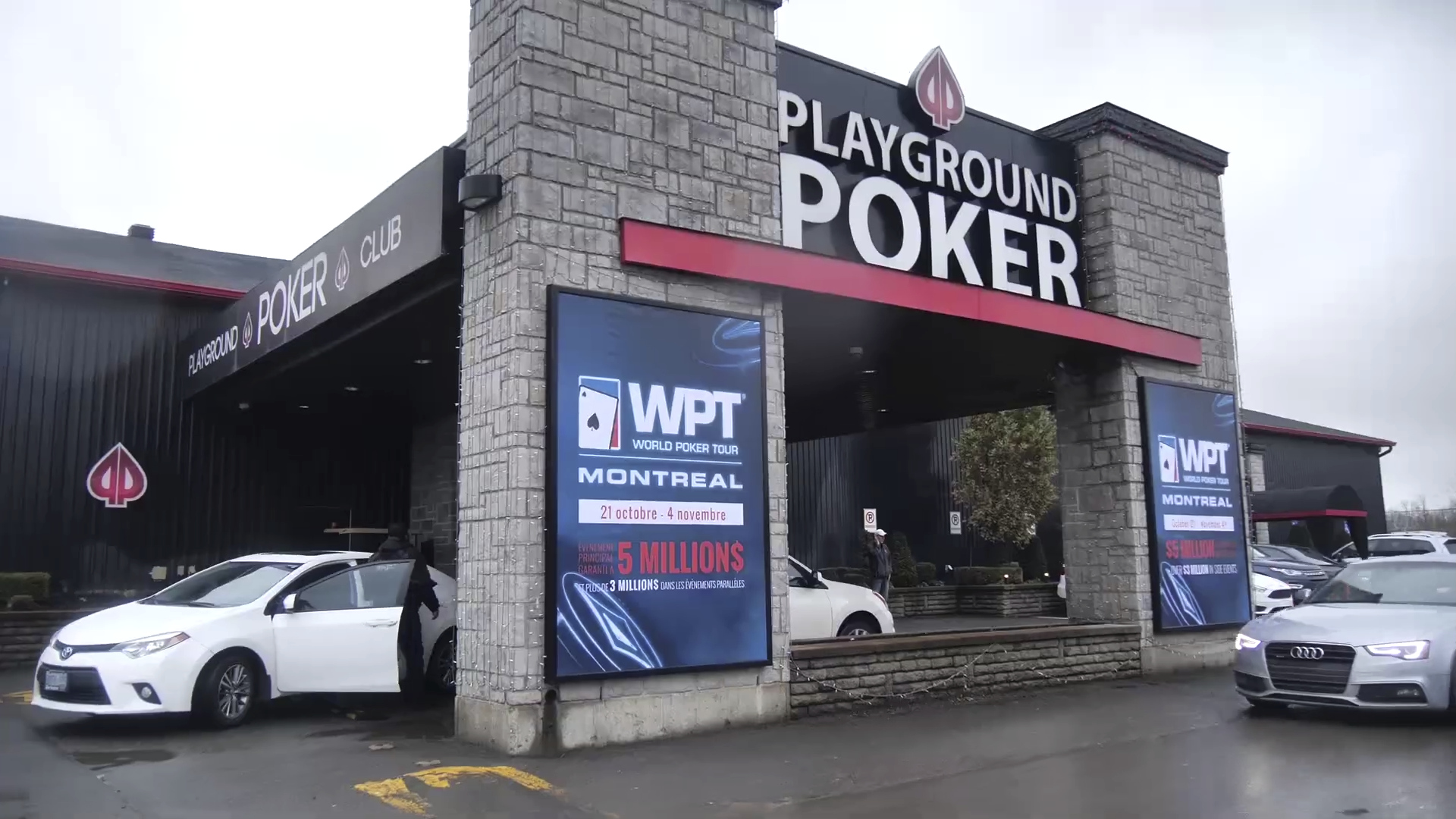
Playground Poker Club

- Casino: Playground Poker Club, Kahnawake, Quebec
- Buy-in: CAD$3,500
- 7-Day Event: April 20-May 5, 2016
- Number of Entries: 417
- Total Prize Pool: CAD$1,293,768
- Number of Payouts: 54

Final Table
Place	Name	Prize (CAD)
1st	(United States) Seth Davies	$274,540
2nd	(Canada) Ruben Perceval	$180,088
3rd	(United States) Joel Miller	$115,570
4th	(Canada) Thomas Taylor	$85,460
5th	(Canada) Guillaume Nolet	$64,160
6th	(United States) Tony Dunst	$51,400

=== WPT Amsterdam ===
- Casino: Holland Casino, Amsterdam, Netherlands
- Buy-in: €3,300
- 5-Day Event: May 10–14, 2016
- Number of Entries: 318
- Total Prize Pool: €911,880
- Number of Payouts: 36

Final Table
Place	Name	Prize
1st	(Serbia) Andjelko Andrejevic	€200,000
2nd	(Czech Republic) Tomas Fara	€143,300
3rd	(United States) Anthony Zinno	€90,460
4th	(France) Emrah Cakmak	€67,300
5th	(United Kingdom) Senh Ung	€50,518
6th	(Netherlands) Hans Bosman	€40,396

=== WPT Choctaw ===
- Casino: Choctaw Casino Resort, Durant, Oklahoma
- Buy-in: $3,700
- 5-Day Event: July 29-August 2, 2016
- Number of Entries: 1,066
- Total Prize Pool: $3,619,070
- Number of Payouts: 109

Final Table
Place	Name	Prize
1st	(United States) James Mackey	$666,758
2nd	(United States) Benjamin Zamani	$412,234
3rd	(United States) Craig Varnell	$306,346
4th	(Germany) Bastian Fischer	$230,300
5th	(United States) Jack Duong	$175,122
6th	(United States) Matthew Smith	$134,720

=== Legends of Poker ===
- Casino: The Bicycle Hotel & Casino, Bell Gardens, California
- Buy-in: $4,000
- 6-Day Event: August 27-September 1, 2016
- Number of Entries: 687
- Total Prize Pool: $2,465,643
- Number of Payouts: 72

Final Table
Place	Name	Prize
1st	(United States) Pat Lyons	$615,346
2nd	(United States) Benjamin Zamani	$341,412
3rd	(United States) Upeshka De Silva	$198,720
4th	(United States) Todd Peterson	$149,715
5th	(United States) William Vo	$113,105
6th	(Brazil) Rafael Oliveira	$85,760

=== Borgata Poker Open ===
- Casino: Borgata Hotel Casino & Spa, Atlantic City, New Jersey
- Buy-in: $3,500
- 6-Day Event: September 18–23, 2016
- Number of Entries: 1,179
- Total Prize Pool: $3,773,979
- Number of Payouts: 110

Final Table
Place	Name	Prize
1st	(United States) Jesse Sylvia	$821,811
2nd	(United States) Zach Gruneberg	$490,617
3rd	(United States) Taha Maruf	$300,031
4th	(United States) Simon Lam	$250,970
5th	(United States) Chris Limo	$207,569
6th	(Colombia) Farid Jattin	$167,942

=== WPT Maryland Live! ===
- Casino: Maryland Live! Casino, Hanover, Maryland
- Buy-in: $3,500
- 5-Day Event: October 1–5, 2016
- Number of Entries: 554
- Total Prize Pool: $1,772,800
- Number of Payouts: 63

Final Table
Place	Name	Prize
1st	(United States) Zachary Smiley	$356,536
2nd	(United States) Ryan Belz	$239,412
3rd	(United States) Mario Silvestri	$153,983
4th	(United States) Darren Elias	$113,905
5th	(United States) Benjamin Zamani	$85,429
6th	(United States) Cate Hall	$68,554

=== bestbet Bounty Scramble ===
- Casino: bestbet Jacksonville, Jacksonville, Florida
- Buy-in: $5,000
- 5-Day Event: October 14–18, 2016
- Number of Entries: 379
- Total Prize Pool: $1,762,350
- Number of Payouts: 48

Final Table
Place	Name	Prize
1st	(United States) Sam Panzica	$354,335
2nd	(United States) Richard Malone Jr.	$237,616
3rd	(United States) Ankush Mandavia	$152,766
4th	(United States) Tyler Patterson	$100,643
5th	(United States) Noah Schwartz	$77,499
6th	(United States) Paul Balzano	$64,183

=== WPT UK ===
- Casino: Dusk Till Dawn Poker & Casino, Nottingham, United Kingdom
- Buy-in: £2,200
- 7-Day Event: October 31-November 6, 2016
- Number of Entries: 522
- Total Prize Pool: £1,044,000
- Number of Payouts: 54

Final Table
Place	Name	Prize
1st	(Spain) Luis Rodriguez Cruz	£200,000
2nd	(United Kingdom) Chris Yong	£135,000
3rd	(Spain) Nabil Cardoso	£90,000
4th	(Belgium) Maxime Swennen	£67,080
5th	(Republic of Ireland) Seamus Cahill	£50,000
6th	(United Kingdom) Alex Lindop	£40,000

=== WPT Montreal ===
- Casino: Playground Poker Club, Kahnawake, Quebec
- Buy-in: CAD$3,850
- 7-Day Event: November 11–17, 2016
- Number of Entries: 648
- Total Prize Pool: CAD$2,199,960
- Number of Payouts: 81

Final Table
Place	Name	Prize (CAD)
1st	(United States) Mike Sexton	$425,980
2nd	(Canada) Benny Chen	$286,110
3rd	(Canada) Nadir Lalji	$183,320
4th	(Israel) Ilan Boujenah	$132,750
5th	(Canada) Ema Zajmović	$102,010
6th	(United States) Jake Schwartz	$81,740

=== WPT Caribbean ===
- Casino: Hard Rock Hotel & Casino, Punta Cana, Dominican Republic
- Buy-in: $5,000
- 5-Day Event: November 19–23, 2016
- Number of Entries: 323
- Total Prize Pool: $1,456,892
- Number of Payouts: 36

Final Table
Place	Name	Prize
1st	(United Kingdom) Niall Farrell	$335,000
2nd	(Costa Rica) Troy Quenneville	$220,000
3rd	(United States) Anthony Augustino	$140,000
4th	(Canada) Colin Moffatt	$105,392
5th	(Cyprus) Yiannis Liperis	$80,000
6th	(United Kingdom) Stephen Woodhead	$66,000

=== WPT Prague ===
- Casino: Hotel Grandior, Prague, Czech Republic
- Buy-in: €3,300
- 5-Day Event: December 2–6, 2016
- Number of Entries: 167
- Total Prize Pool: €551,100
- Number of Payouts: 21

Final Table
Place	Name	Prize
1st	(Ukraine) Oleg Vasylchenko	€132,200
2nd	(Russia) Anton Petrov	€82,000
3rd	(Germany) Tonio Roder	€52,500
4th	(France) Romain Lewis	€39,120
5th	(Czech Republic) Martin Kabrhel	€29,410
6th	(Norway) Preben Stokkan	€23,520

=== Five Diamond World Poker Classic ===
- Casino: Bellagio Resort & Casino, Las Vegas, Nevada
- Buy-in: $10,400
- 6-Day Event: December 5–10, 2016
- Number of Entries: 791
- Total Prize Pool: $7,672,700
- Number of Payouts: 72

Final Table
Place	Name	Prize
1st	(United States) James Romero	$1,938,118
2nd	(United States) Ryan Tosoc	$1,124,051
3rd	(United States) Jake Schindler	$736,579
4th	(United States) Alex Condon	$494,889
5th	(United States) Justin Bonomo	$345,272
6th	(Ukraine) Igor Yaroshevskyy	$268,545

=== Borgata Winter Poker Open ===
- Casino: Borgata Hotel & Casino, Atlantic City, New Jersey
- Buy-in: $3,500
- 6-Day Event: January 29-February 3, 2017
- Number of Entries: 1,312
- Total Prize Pool: $4,199,712
- Number of Payouts: 130

Final Table
Place	Name	Prize
1st	(United States) Daniel Weinman	$892,433
2nd	(United States) Nathan Bjerno	$524,964
3rd	(United States) Tyler Kenney	$327,578
4th	(United States) Jia Liu	$275,081
5th	(United States) Richard Foster	$228,884
6th	(United States) Nicholas Immekus	$184,787

=== WPT Playground ===
- Casino: Playground Poker Club, Kahnawake, Quebec
- Buy-in: $3,500
- 6-Day Event: February 10–15, 2017
- Number of Entries: 380
- Total Prize Pool: $1,179,520
- Number of Payouts: 48
- Note: Zajmović became the first woman to win an open WPT event.

Final Table
Place	Name	Prize (CAD)
1st	(Canada) Ema Zajmović	$261,000
2nd	(Canada) Jean-Francois Bouchard	$169,270
3rd	(Canada) Eric Afriat	$108,690
4th	(Canada) Tam Ho	$71,670
5th	(Canada) Mekhail Mekhail	$55,200
6th	(Canada) Jean-Pascal Savard	$45,690

=== Fallsview Poker Classic ===
- Casino: Fallsview Casino, Niagara Falls, Ontario
- Buy-in: $5,000
- 3-Day Event: February 22–24, 2017
- Number of Entries: 489
- Total Prize Pool: $2,229,954
- Number of Payouts: 63

Final Table
Place	Name	Prize (CAD)
1st	(United States) Darren Elias	$429,384
2nd	(United States) David Eldridge	$300,982
3rd	(Canada) Jean-Christophe Ferreira	$193,583
4th	(Canada) Andrew Chen	$143,199
5th	(Germany) Manig Löser	$107,399
6th	(Canada) Abdull Hassan	$86,184

=== L.A. Poker Classic ===
- Casino: Commerce Casino, Commerce, California
- Buy-in: $10,000
- 6-Day Event: February 25-March 2, 2017
- Number of Entries: 521
- Total Prize Pool: $5,001,600
- Number of Payouts: 66

Final Table
Place	Name	Prize
1st	(United States) Daniel Strelitz	$1,001,110
2nd	(Bulgaria) Simeon Naydenov	$672,190
3rd	(United States) Jared Griener	$431,340
4th	(United States) Mike Sexton	$300,690
5th	(United States) Jesse Martin	$230,380
6th	(United States) Richard Tuhrim	$191,490

=== Bay 101 Shooting Star ===
- Casino: Bay 101, San Jose, California
- Buy-in: $7,500
- 5-Day Event: March 6–10, 2017
- Number of Entries: 806
- Total Prize Pool: $5,722,600
- Number of Payouts: 81

Final Table
Place	Name	Prize
1st	(United States) Sam Panzica	$1,373,000
2nd	(United States) Anthony Spinella	$786,610
3rd	(United States) David Rheem	$521,660
4th	(United States) Paul Volpe	$349,610
5th	(United States) Dennis Stevermer	$243,090
6th	(Germany) Rainer Kempe	$188,460

=== WPT Rolling Thunder ===
- Casino: Thunder Valley Casino Resort, Lincoln, California
- Buy-in: $3,500
- 5-Day Event: March 11–15, 2017
- Number of Entries: 421
- Total Prize Pool: $1,347,200
- Number of Payouts: 53

Final Table
Place	Name	Prize
1st	(United States) Mike Del Vecchio	$284,638
2nd	(Canada) Sorel Mizzi	$190,105
3rd	(United States) Steven Tabb	$122,296
4th	(United States) John Hadley	$81,930
5th	(United States) Olivier Busquet	$63,013
6th	(United States) Connor Drinan	$52,222

=== Seminole Hard Rock Poker Showdown ===
- Casino: Seminole Hard Rock Hotel and Casino, Hollywood, Florida
- Buy-in: $3,500
- 6-Day Event: March 31-April 5, 2017
- Number of Entries: 1,207
- Total Prize Pool: $3,862,400
- Number of Payouts: 151

Final Table
Place	Name	Prize
1st	(United States) Tony Sinishtaj	$661,283
2nd	(United States) Darryll Fish	$453,185
3rd	(United States) Robert Mizrachi	$293,864
4th	(United States) Daniel Colman	$217,686
5th	(United States) Eric Beller	$164,438
6th	(Bulgaria) Simeon Naydenov	$132,889

=== Seminole Hard Rock Poker Finale ===
- Casino: Seminole Hard Rock Hotel and Casino, Hollywood, Florida
- Buy-in: $10,000
- 5-Day Event: April 2–6, 2017
- Number of Entries: 349
- Total Prize Pool: $3,315,500
- Number of Payouts: 44

Final Table
Place	Name	Prize
1st	(United States) Ryan Riess	$716,088
2nd	(United States) Alan Sternberg	$491,081
3rd	(Belgium) Terry Schumacher	$315,726
4th	(United States) Tim West	$204,466
5th	(United States) Jason Koon	$157,599
6th	(United States) Cliff Josephy	$130,370

=== WPT Tournament of Champions ===
- Casino: Seminole Hard Rock Hotel and Casino, Hollywood, Florida
- Buy-in: $15,000
- 3-Day Event: April 7–9, 2017
- Number of Entries: 66
- Total Prize Pool: $1,090,000
- Number of Payouts: 9

Final Table
Place	Name	Prize
1st	(United States) Daniel Weinman	$381,500
2nd	(United States) Michael Mizrachi	$218,000
3rd	(United States) Daniel Santoro	$133,525
4th	(Canada) David Ormsby	$95,375
5th	(United States) Erik Seidel	$73,575
6th	(United States) Dylan Wilkerson	$57,225

== Player of the Year ==
Final Standings
Rank	Name	Points
1	Benjamin Zamani	2,550
2	Sam Panzica	2,500
3	Mike Sexton	2,100
4	Simeon Naydenov	1,800
5	Darren Elias	1,650
5	James Mackey	1,650
