= Ema Zajmović =

Bosnian-Croatian poker player (born 1990)

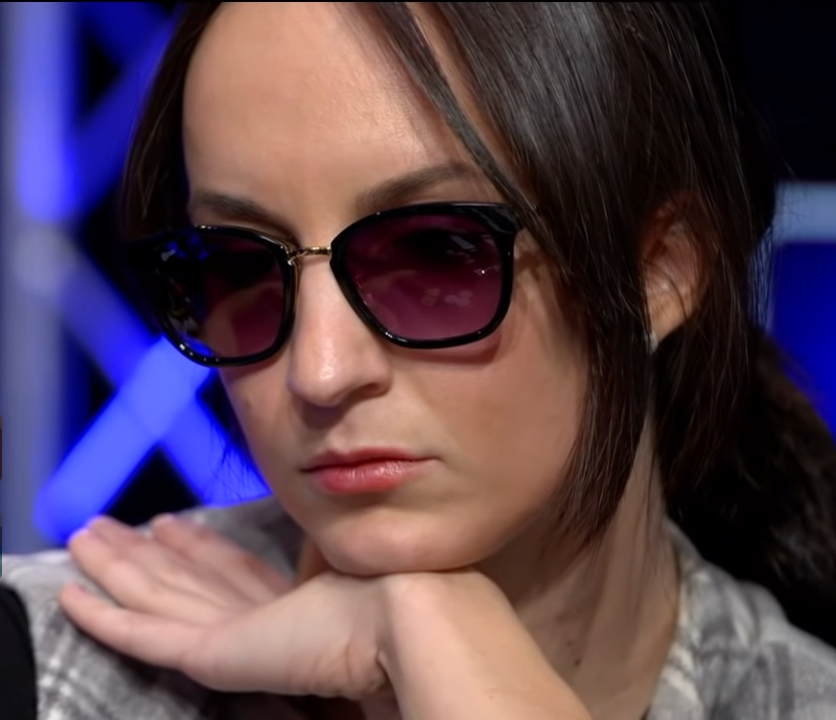
- Zajmović in 2018
- Born: 7 April 1990 (age 36); Bosnia and Herzegovina (then part of SFR Yugoslavia)

World Series of Poker
- Bracelet: None
- Final table: None
- Money finishes: 9
- Highest WSOP Main Event finish: 215th, 2018

World Poker Tour
- Title: 1
- Final tables: 4
- Money finishes: 11

European Poker Tour
- Title: None
- Final table: None
- Money finish: 1

Ema Zajmović (born 7 April 1990) became the first and only woman to win an open World Poker Tour (WPT) Main Event.

== Early life and education ==
Born to Bosnian parents in 1990, Zajmović grew up in war-torn Bosnia. Her family moved to Quebec City, Quebec, after the war in 1996. An introvert and a good student when she was young, she originally wanted to become a lawyer, but at Université Laval in Quebec she studied public relations and earned a master's degree in political communication. She worked for Justin Trudeau's first election campaign in 2015 and, after moving to Montreal, worked part-time for a public relations company as her poker career progressed.

Ema Zajmovic holds a master’s degree in public relations from Université Laval, where she also earned a PhD in public relations in 2026. Her doctoral thesis is titled La communication stratégique post-crise dans une organisation gouvernementale québécoise après la COVID-19 (Post-crisis strategic communication in a Quebec government organization after COVID-19). Since 2023, she has been a lecturer in the Département d’information et de communication at Université Laval. She is a member of the Observatoire des médias sociaux en relations publiques et intelligence artificielle (OMSRP). Her work spans teaching, public relations research, and communication consulting, a field in which she has worked for nearly eight years.

== Poker experience ==
Zajmović won her first tournament prize money in August 2011 at a European Poker Tour (EPT) side event in Barcelona. In July 2016, she made her debut at the World Series of Poker (WSOP) in Las Vegas, finishing 929th for a cash prize of US$15,000. In November 2016, at WPT Montreal (held at the Playground Poker Club in Kahnawake), she reached her first WPT Main Tour final table, but bluffed away her chip lead to finish in fifth place for just over CA$100,000.

Returning to Kahnawake for WPT Playground two months later, Zajmović made her second straight final table and this time came out on top, placing first out of 380 entrants for CA$241,500 and a wrestling-style belt. She entered the final day as the chip leader; she retook the lead multiple times as she knocked out the last four players, clinching the tournament when her K♠ Q♠ hit two pair. This victory, on 15 February 2017, marked the first time in WPT's 15-year history that a woman had won a Main Tour open buy-in event, (Note: Zajmović was the second woman to win a WPT Main Event in general, following Van Nguyen at the WPT Celebrity Invitational in 2008.) an achievement that was recognized with the Moment of the Year Award at the 2017 American Poker Awards. (Note: As of 2022, Zajmović remains the only woman to win an open WPT Main Event.)

Zajmović narrowly lost two WPT Main Tour events the next year. She made her third Main Event final table in April 2018 in Amsterdam, where she finished in second place for just over €100,000. In November 2018, she returned to WPT Montreal for her biggest payout to date: Though she got beat by a heads-up hero call, she received CA$556,000 for second place.

== See also ==
- Barbara Enright, first woman to win an open World Series of Poker event
- Victoria Coren Mitchell, first woman to win a European Poker Tour event
