= Frankie O'Dell =

American poker player

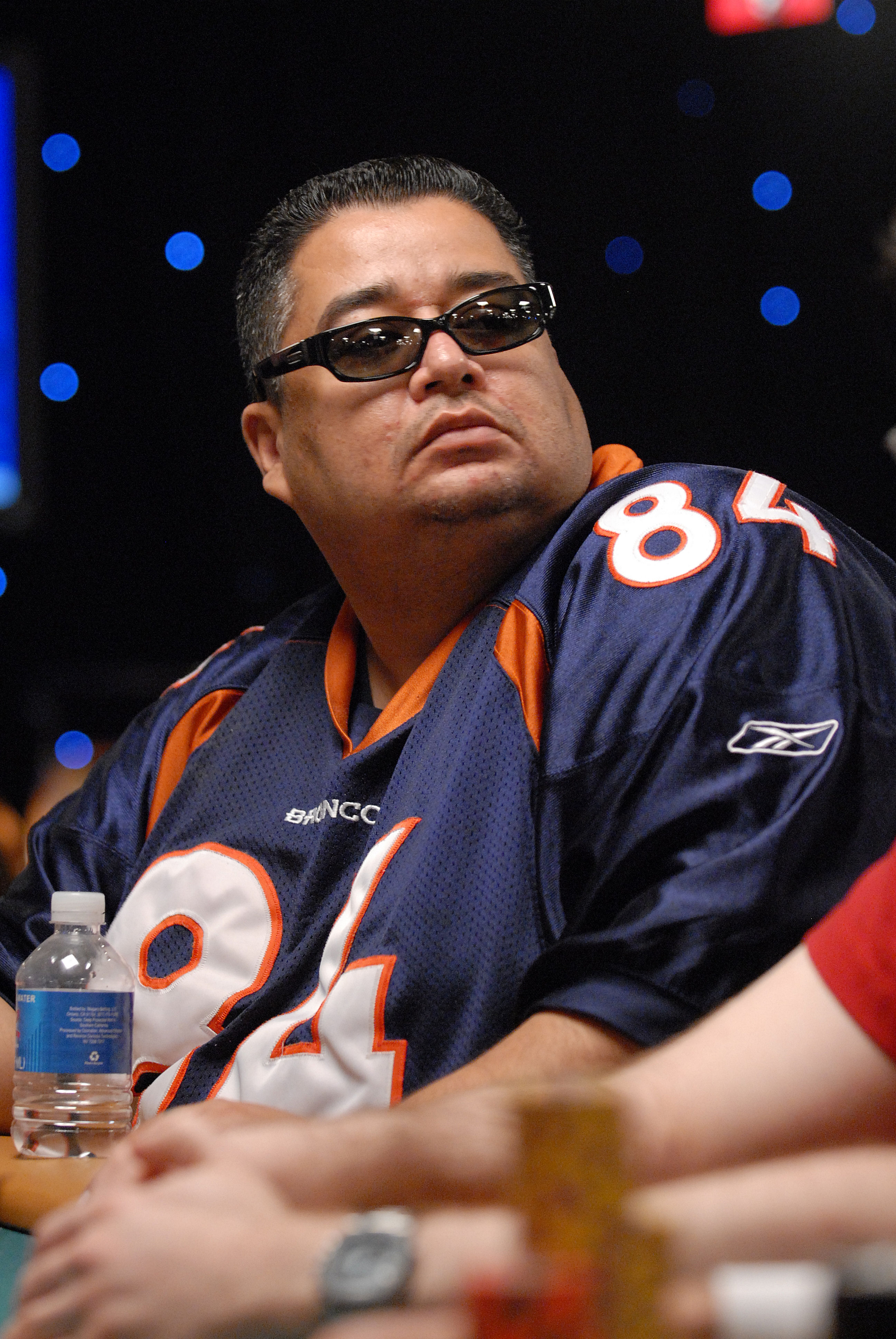
- O'Dell at the 2007 World Series of Poker

World Series of Poker
- Bracelets: 3
- Money finishes: 22
- Highest WSOP Main Event finish: 418th, 2008

World Poker Tour
- Title: None
- Final table: 1
- Money finish: 1

Frankie O'Dell is an American professional poker player residing in Long Beach, California. He has won three World Series of Poker bracelets in Omaha Hi-Lo Split. His first win came in the 2003 World Series of Poker in the $1,500 event, his second in the $2,000 event in 2007, and the third in the $10,000 Omaha Hi-Lo Championship in 2019. O'Dell is the only player to have won three WSOP Omaha Hi-Lo events.

At the $9,700 World Poker Tour Championship Event at the 2006 Legends of Poker, O'Dell finished runner-up to Joe Pelton, earning $776,385. He also finished second in the $1,500 Dealers Choice event at the 2018 WSOP.

As of 2019, O'Dell has tournament winnings that exceed $2,900,000.

== World Series of Poker bracelets ==
Year	Tournament	Prize (US$)
2003	$1,500 Omaha Hi/Lo Split	$133,760
2007	$2,000 Omaha Hi/Lo Split	$240,057
2019	$10,000 Omaha Hi/Lo Split	$443,641
