= World Poker Tour season 16 results =

Below are the results for season 16 (XVI) of the World Poker Tour (2017–18).

== Results ==
=== WPT Beijing ===
- Casino: NUO Hotel, Beijing, China
- Buy-in: Invitational
- 5-Day Event: April 15–19, 2017
- Number of Entries: 400
- Total Prize Pool: CNY 9,600,000
- Number of Payouts: 50

Final Table
Place	Name	Prize (CNY)
1st	(Taiwan) Pete Chen	2,063,454
2nd	(China) Ke Chen	1,373,026
3rd	(China) Yingqi Lu	882,619
4th	(China) Wenbin Zhang	585,468
5th	(China) Yancheng Tan	450,616
6th	(Singapore) Bryan Huang	373,218

=== WPT Amsterdam ===
- Casino: Holland Casino, Amsterdam, Netherlands
- Buy-in: €3,300
- 5-Day Event: May 9–13, 2017
- Number of Entries: 224
- Total Prize Pool: €672,000
- Number of Payouts: 28

Final Table
Place	Name	Prize
1st	(Kazakhstan) Daniel Daniyar	€152,600
2nd	(United Kingdom) Louis Salter	€106,710
3rd	(Netherlands) Jan Jansma	€65,570
4th	(Kazakhstan) Shyngis Satubayev	€39,885
5th	(Netherlands) Jorn Walthaus	€30,800
6th	(Netherlands) Jonathan Rozema	€25,525

=== WPT Choctaw ===
- Casino: Choctaw Casino Resort, Durant, Oklahoma
- Buy-in: $3,700
- 5-Day Event: August 4–8, 2017
- Number of Entries: 924
- Total Prize Pool: $3,121,980
- Number of Payouts: 99

Final Table
Place	Name	Prize
1st	(United States) Jay Lee	$593,173
2nd	(United States) Jeb Hutton	$366,895
3rd	(United States) Josh Kay	$270,801
4th	(United States) Michael Stashin	$202,617
5th	(United States) Paul Fisher	$153,508
6th	(United States) Eric Bunch	$117,761

=== Legends of Poker ===
- Casino: The Bicycle Hotel & Casino, Bell Gardens, California
- Buy-in: $4,000
- 7-Day Event: August 25–31, 2017
- Number of Entries: 763
- Total Prize Pool: $2,738,407
- Number of Payouts: 81

Final Table
Place	Name	Prize
1st	(United States) Art Papazyan	$668,692
2nd	(United States) Phil Hellmuth	$364,370
3rd	(United States) J.C. Tran	$217,040
4th	(United States) D.J. Alexander	$161,490
5th	(Germany) Marvin Rettenmaier	$120,775
6th	(United States) Adam Swan	$91,825

=== Borgata Poker Open ===
- Casino: Borgata Hotel Casino & Spa, Atlantic City, New Jersey
- Buy-in: $3,500
- 6-Day Event: September 17–22, 2017
- Number of Entries: 1,132
- Total Prize Pool: $3,623,532
- Number of Payouts: 110

Final Table
Place	Name	Prize
1st	(China) Guo Liang Chen	$789,058
2nd	(United States) Gregory Weber	$471,059
3rd	(United States) Jia Liu	$288,071
4th	(United States) Matt Parry	$240,965
5th	(United States) Cliff Josephy	$199,294
6th	(United States) Thomas Paul	$161,247

=== WPT Maryland ===
- Casino: Maryland Live! Casino, Hanover, Maryland
- Buy-in: $3,500
- 5-Day Event: September 30-October 4, 2017
- Number of Entries: 561
- Total Prize Pool: $2,000,000
- Number of Payouts: 71

Final Table
Place	Name	Prize
1st	(United States) Art Papazyan	$389,405
2nd	(United States) Zachary Donovan	$262,930
3rd	(United States) Tom Reynolds	$168,990
4th	(United States) Randal Heeb	$120,165
5th	(United States) Grigoriy Shvarts	$92,015
6th	(United States) Timothy Chang	$76,620

=== bestbet Bounty Scramble ===
- Casino: bestbet Jacksonville, Jacksonville, Florida
- Buy-in: $5,000
- 5-Day Event: October 21–25, 2017
- Number of Entries: 323
- Total Prize Pool: $1,501,950
- Number of Payouts: 41

Final Table
Place	Name	Prize
1st	(United States) Paul Petraglia	$315,732
2nd	(United States) Sam Panzica	$210,783
3rd	(United States) Darren Elias	$135,548
4th	(United States) John Esposito	$86,440
5th	(United States) Gaurav Raina	$66,674
6th	(United States) Shankar Pillai	$55,191

=== WPT Montreal ===
- Casino: Playground Poker Club, Kahnawake, Quebec
- Buy-in: $3,850
- 7-Day Event: November 10–16, 2017
- Number of Entries: 606
- Total Prize Pool: $2,057,370
- Number of Payouts: 76

Final Table
Place	Name	Prize (CAD)
1st	(Canada) Maxime Heroux	$403,570
2nd	(Republic of Ireland) Pat Quinn	$271,030
3rd	(United States) Derek Wolters	$173,220
4th	(United States) Brendan Baksh	$124,310
5th	(Canada) Eric Afriat	$95,370
6th	(United States) David Peters	$78,050

=== Five Diamond World Poker Classic ===
- Casino: Bellagio Resort & Casino, Las Vegas, Nevada
- Buy-in: $10,400
- 6-Day Event: December 5–10, 2017
- Number of Entries: 812
- Total Prize Pool: $7,876,400
- Number of Payouts: 81

Final Table
Place	Name	Prize
1st	(United States) Ryan Tosoc	$1,958,065
2nd	(United States) Alex Foxen	$1,134,202
3rd	(United States) Mike Del Vecchio	$752,196
4th	(United States) Sean Perry	$504,090
5th	(United States) Ajay Chabra	$350,500
6th	(United States) Richard Kirsch	$271,736

=== WPT Berlin ===
- Casino: Casino Spielbank, Berlin, Germany
- Buy-in: €3,300
- 4-Day Event: January 12–15, 2018
- Number of Entries: 339
- Total Prize Pool: €1,000,000
- Number of Payouts: 43

Final Table
Place	Name	Prize
1st	(Germany) Ole Schemion	€218,435
2nd	(Czech Republic) Michal Mrakes	€143,845
3rd	(Germany) Patrice Brandt	€93,105
4th	(Germany) Michael Behnert	€60,730
5th	(Germany) Hanyong Kuo	€46,705
6th	(Turkey) Amjad Nader	€39,010

=== Lucky Hearts Poker Open ===
- Casino: Seminole Hard Rock Hotel and Casino, Hollywood, Florida
- Buy-in: $3,500
- 6-Day Event: January 19–24, 2018
- Number of Entries: 911
- Total Prize Pool: $2,915,200
- Number of Payouts: 114

Final Table
Place	Name	Prize
1st	(United States) Darryll Fish	$511,604
2nd	(Russia) Aleksandr Shevelev	$331,116
3rd	(United States) Andy Frankenberger	$244,342
4th	(France) Ness Reilly	$182,249
5th	(United States) Brett Bader	$137,440
6th	(United States) Alan Krockey	$104,784

=== Borgata Winter Poker Open ===
- Casino: Borgata, Atlantic City, New Jersey
- Buy-in: $3,500
- 6-Day Event: January 28-February 2, 2018
- Number of Entries: 1,244
- Total Prize Pool: $3,967,000
- Number of Payouts: 157

Final Table
Place	Name	Prize
1st	(Canada) Eric Afriat	$651,928
2nd	(United States) Justin Zaki	$434,614
3rd	(United States) Zach Gruneberg	$321,533
4th	(United States) Joe McKeehen	$240,251
5th	(United States) Michael Marder	$181,329
6th	(United States) Stephen Song	$138,254

=== Fallsview Poker Classic ===
- Casino: Fallsview Casino, Niagara Falls, Ontario
- Buy-in: $5,000
- 3-Day Event: February 10–12, 2018
- Number of Entries: 517
- Total Prize Pool: $2,337,803
- Number of Payouts: 67

Final Table
Place	Name	Prize
1st	(Canada) Mike Leah	$451,821
2nd	(Canada) Ryan Yu	$301,217
3rd	(Canada) Tim Rutherford	$222,315
4th	(United States) Carlos Chadha	$165,847
5th	(United States) Daniel Wagner	$125,069
6th	(Canada) Joe Ferrier	$95,355

=== L.A. Poker Classic ===
- Casino: Commerce Casino, Commerce, California
- Buy-in: $10,000
- 6-Day Event: February 24-March 1, 2018
- Number of Entries: 493
- Total Prize Pool: $4,681,035
- Number of Payouts: 62

Final Table
Place	Name	Prize
1st	(United States) Dennis Blieden	$1,000,000
2nd	(United Kingdom) Toby Lewis	$600,630
3rd	(United States) Derek Wolters	$430,210
4th	(Republic of Ireland) Marc Macdonnell	$319,310
5th	(United States) Peter Hengsakul	$244,430
6th	(Spain) Manuel Martinez	$186,325

=== WPT Rolling Thunder ===
- Casino: Thunder Valley Casino Resort, Lincoln, California
- Buy-in: $3,500
- 5-Day Event: March 2–6, 2018
- Number of Entries: 440
- Total Prize Pool: $1,408,000
- Number of Payouts: 55

Final Table
Place	Name	Prize
1st	(United States) David Larson	$295,128
2nd	(United States) Ian Steinman	$201,428
3rd	(United States) Joe McKeehen	$131,081
4th	(United States) Ping Liu	$97,510
5th	(Germany) Rayo Kniep	$69,650
6th	(United States) D.J. Alexander	$56,417

=== Seminole Hard Rock Poker Showdown ===
- Casino: Seminole Hard Rock Hotel and Casino, Hollywood, Florida
- Buy-in: $3,500
- 6-Day Event: April 13–18, 2018
- Number of Entries: 1,309
- Total Prize Pool: $4,188,800
- Number of Payouts: 164

Final Table
Place	Name	Prize
1st	(United Kingdom) Scott Margereson	$696,740
2nd	(United States) Faraz Jaka	$454,496
3rd	(United States) Brian Hastings	$336,466
4th	(United States) Joey Couden	$251,523
5th	(United States) Matt Stout	$189,880
6th	(United States) Jeff Fielder	$144,775

=== WPT Amsterdam ===
- Casino: Holland Casino, Amsterdam, Netherlands
- Buy-in: €3,300
- 5-Day Event: April 16–20, 2018
- Number of Entries: 207
- Total Prize Pool: €590,170
- Number of Payouts: 26

Final Table
Place	Name	Prize
1st	(Netherlands) Rens Feenstra	€156,370
2nd	(Canada) Ema Zajmović	€100,260
3rd	(Netherlands) Firoz Mangroe	€60,140
4th	(United Kingdom) Gary Miller	€36,795
5th	(United Kingdom) Louis Salter	€28,415
6th	(Netherlands) Paul Berende	€23,550

=== Bellagio Elite Poker Championship ===
- Casino: Bellagio, Las Vegas, Nevada
- Buy-in: $10,400
- 6-Day Event: May 1–6, 2018
- Number of Entries: 126
- Total Prize Pool: $1,220,200
- Number of Payouts: 16

Final Table
Place	Name	Prize
1st	(United States) Larry Greenberg	$378,879
2nd	(United States) Danny Qutami	$223,663
3rd	(United States) Jim Collopy	$146,644
4th	(United States) Adrian Garduno	$100,832
5th	(United States) Ryan Van Sanford	$78,221
6th	(United States) Cary Katz	$60,499

=== Bobby Baldwin Classic ===
- Casino: Aria Resort and Casino, Las Vegas, Nevada
- Buy-in: $10,000
- 4-Day Event: May 20–23, 2018
- Number of Entries: 162
- Total Prize Pool: $1,555,200
- Number of Payouts: 21
- Note: Elias became the first player to win four WPT titles

Final Table
Place	Name	Prize
1st	(United States) Darren Elias	$387,580
2nd	(Taiwan) Kitty Kuo	$248,380
3rd	(United States) Joe McKeehen	$178,610
4th	(Germany) Dietrich Fast	$130,895
5th	(United States) Sam Panzica	$97,795
6th	(United States) Jonathan Little	$74,520

=== WPT Tournament of Champions ===
- Casino: Aria Resort and Casino, Las Vegas, Nevada
- Buy-in: $15,000
- 3-Day Event: May 24–26, 2018
- Number of Entries: 80
- Total Prize Pool: $1,365,000
- Number of Payouts: 10

Final Table
Place	Name	Prize
1st	(United States) Matthew Waxman	$463,375
2nd	(Lithuania) Matas Cimbolas	$265,590
3rd	(United States) Darren Elias	$177,060
4th	(France) David Benyamine	$123,045
5th	(United States) Nick Schulman	$89,290
6th	(United States) J.C. Tran	$67,800

== Player of the Year ==
Final Standings
Rank	Name	Points
1	Art Papazyan	2,450
2	Joe McKeehen	2,350
3	Darren Elias	1,850
3	Derek Wolters	1,850
5	Eric Afriat	1,750
