= 2018 World Series of Poker =

Series of poker tournaments

- Location: Rio All-Suite Hotel and Casino, Las Vegas, Nevada
- Dates: May 30 – July 17

Champion
- (United States) John Cynn

The 2018 World Series of Poker (WSOP) was the 49th annual World Series of Poker event, and took place from May 30 to July 17 at the Rio All Suite Hotel and Casino in Las Vegas, Nevada. There were a record 78 bracelet events. The $10,000 No Limit Hold'em Main Event began on July 2 and concluded on July 15.

The main event, as well as the Big One for One Drop, were again streamed in their entirety on ESPN and Poker Central.

The event saw the retirement of ten-time bracelet winner and Poker Hall of Fame member Doyle Brunson from tournament poker. He announced his retirement after registering for the $10,000 No Limit 2-7 Lowball Draw Championship (Event 23). He made the final table of the event and finished in sixth place.

== Schedule changes ==
The World Series of Poker introduced the Big Blind Ante to eight events. This format made the big blind pay the ante for the entire table. It was utilized for events 13, 20, 45, 54, 74, 77 and 78.

== Event schedule ==
Online event.

#	Event	Entrants	Winner	Prize	Runner-up	Results
1	$565 Casino Employees No Limit Hold'em	566	Jordan Hufty (1/1)	$61,909	Jodie Sanders	Results
2	$10,000 No Limit Hold'em Super Turbo Bounty	243	Elio Fox (1/2)	$393,693	Adam Adler	Results
3	$3,000 No Limit Hold'em Shootout	363	Joe Cada (1/3)	$226,218	Sam Phillips	Results
4	$1,500 Omaha Hi-Lo 8 or Better	911	Julien Martini (1/1)	$239,771	Kate Hoang	Results
5	$100,000 No Limit Hold'em High Roller	105	Nick Petrangelo (1/2)	$2,910,227	Elio Fox (1/2)	Results
6	$365 Giant No Limit Hold'em	8,920	Jeremy Perrin (1/1)	$250,000	Luis Vazquez	Results
7	$565 Colossus No Limit Hold'em	13,070	Roberly Felicio (1/1)	$1,000,000	Sang Liu	Results
8	$2,500 Mixed Triple Draw Lowball	321	Johannes Becker (1/1)	$180,455	Scott Seiver (0/1)	Results
9	$10,000 Omaha Hi-Lo 8 or Better Championship	169	Paul Volpe (1/3)	$417,921	Eli Elezra (0/3)	Results
10	$365 WSOP.com Online No Limit Hold'em	2,972	William Reymond (1/1)	$154,996	Shawn Stroke	Results
11	$365 Giant Pot Limit Omaha	3,250	Tim Andrew (1/1)	$116,015	Pete Arroyos	Results
12	$1,500 Dealers Choice 6-Handed	406	Jeremy Harkin (1/1)	$129,882	Frankie O'Dell (0/2)	Results
13	$1,500 Big Blind Antes No Limit Hold'em	1,306	Benjamin Moon (1/1)	$315,346	Romain Lewis	Results
14	$1,500 No Limit 2-7 Lowball Draw	260	Daniel Ospina (1/1)	$87,678	Tim McDermott	Results
15	$1,500 H.O.R.S.E.	731	Andrey Zhigalov (1/1)	$202,787	Timothy Frazin	Results
16	$10,000 Heads Up No Limit Hold'em Championship	114	Justin Bonomo (1/2)	$185,965	Jason McConnon	Results
17	$1,500 No Limit Hold'em 6-Handed	1,663	Ognyan Dimov (1/1)	$378,743	Antonio Barbato	Results
18	$10,000 Dealers Choice 6-Handed	111	Adam Friedman (1/2)	$293,275	Stuart Rutter	Results
19	$565 Pot Limit Omaha	2,419	Craig Varnell (1/1)	$181,790	Seth Zimmerman	Results
20	$5,000 Big Blind Antes No Limit Hold'em	518	Jeremy Wien (1/1)	$537,710	David Laka	Results
21	$1,500 No Limit Hold'em Millionaire Maker	7,361	Arne Kern (1/1)	$1,173,223	Sam Razavi	Results
22	$1,500 Eight Game Mix	481	Philip Long (1/1)	$147,348	Kevin Malis	Results
23	$10,000 No Limit 2-7 Lowball Draw Championship	95	Brian Rast (1/4)	$259,670	Mike Wattel (0/2)	Results
24	$2,620 The Marathon No Limit Hold'em	1,637	Michael Addamo (1/1)	$653,581	Mark Sleet	Results
25	$1,500 Seven Card Stud Hi-Lo 8 or Better	596	Benjamin Dobson (1/1)	$173,528	Tim Finne	Results
26	$1,000 Pot Limit Omaha	986	Filippos Stavrakis (1/1)	$169,842	Jordan Siegel	Results
27	$10,000 H.O.R.S.E.	166	John Hennigan (1/5)	$414,692	David "Bakes" Baker (0/2)	Results
28	$3,000 No Limit Hold'em 6-Handed	868	Gal Yifrach (1/1)	$461,798	James Mackey (0/1)	Results
29	$1,500 Limit 2-7 Lowball Triple Draw	356	Hanh Tran (1/1)	$117,282	Oscar Johansson	Results
30	$1,500 Pot Limit Omaha	799	Ryan Bambrick (1/1)	$217,123	Sampo Ryynanen	Results
31	$1,500 Seven Card Stud	310	Steven Albini (1/1)	$105,629	Jeff Lisandro (0/6)	Results
32	$1,000 Seniors No Limit Hold'em	5,919	Matthew Davis(1/1)	$662,983	Bill Stabler	Results
33	$50,000 Poker Players Championship	87	Michael Mizrachi (1/4)	$1,239,126	John Hennigan (1/5)	Results
34	$1,000 Double Stack No Limit Hold'em	5,700	Robert Peacock (1/1)	$644,224	Nicholas Salimbene	Results
35	$1,500 Mixed Pot Limit Omaha Hi-Lo/Big O	773	Yueqi Zhu (1/1)	$211,781	Gabe Ramos	Results
36	$1,000 Super Seniors No Limit Hold'em	2,191	Farhintaj Bonyadi (1/1)	$311,451	Robert Beach	Results
37	$1,500 No Limit Hold'em	1,330	Eric Baldwin (1/2)	$319,580	Ian Steinman	Results
38	$10,000 Seven Card Stud Championship	83	Yaniv Birman (1/1)	$236,238	Jesse Martin (0/2)	Results
39	$1,500 No Limit Hold'em Shootout	908	Preston Lee (1/1)	$236,498	Corey Dodd	Results
40	$2,500 Mixed Big Bet	205	Scott Bohlman (1/1)	$122,138	Ryan Hughes (0/2)	Results
41	$1,500 Limit Hold'em	596	Robert Nehorayan (1/1)	$173,568	Kevin Song (0/1)	Results
42	$25,000 Pot Limit Omaha 8-Handed High Roller	230	Shaun Deeb (1/3)	$1,402,683	Ben Yu (0/2)	Results
43	$2,500 No Limit Hold'em	1,248	Timur Margolin (1/1)	$507,274	Ismael Bojang	Results
44	$10,000 Limit 2-7 Lowball Triple Draw Championship	109	Nicholas Seiken (1/1)	$287,987	Randy Ohel	Results
45	$1,000 Big Blind Antes No Limit Hold'em	1,712	Mario Prats (1/1)	$258,255	Matthew Hunt	Results
46	$2,500 Mixed Omaha/Seven Card Stud Hi-Lo 8 or Better	402	David Brookshire (1/1)	$214,291	Brendan Taylor (0/1)	Results
47	$565 WSOP.com Online Pot Limit Omaha 6-Handed	1,223	Matthew Mendez (1/1)	$135,078	Marton Czuczor	Results
48	$1,500 No Limit Hold'em Monster Stack	6,260	Tommy Nguyen (1/1)	$1,037,451	James Carroll	Results
49	$10,000 Pot Limit Omaha 8-Handed Championship	476	Loren Klein (1/3)	$1,018,336	Rep Porter (0/3)	Results
50	$1,500 Razz	389	Jay Kwon (1/1)	$125,431	Dzmitry Urbanovich	Results
51	$1,500 No Limit Hold'em Bounty	1,983	Ryan Leng (1/1)	$272,765	Ranno Sootla	Results
52	$10,000 Limit Hold'em Championship	114	Scott Seiver (1/2)	$296,222	Matt Szymaszek	Results
53	$1,500 Pot Limit Omaha Hi-Lo 8 or Better	935	Joey Couden (1/1)	$244,370	Bruno Fitoussi	Results
54	$3,000 Big Blind Antes No Limit Hold'em	1,020	Diogo Veiga (1/1)	$522,715	Barry Hutter (0/1)	Results
55	$1,000 Tag Team No Limit Hold'em	1,032	Nikita Luther (1/1); Giuseppe Pantaleo (1/1)	$175,805	Kazuki Ikeuchi; Hiroki Iwata; Sho Mori	Results
56	$10,000 Razz Championship	119	Calvin Anderson (1/2)	$309,220	Frank Kassela (0/3)	Results
57	$1,000/$10,000 Ladies No Limit Hold'em Championship	696	Jessica Dawley (1/1)	$130,230	Jill Pike	Results
58	$5,000 No Limit Hold'em 6-Handed	621	Jean-Robert Bellande (1/1)	$616,302	Dean Lyall	Results
59	$1,000 No Limit Hold'em Super Turbo Bounty	2,065	Mike Takayama (1/1)	$198,568	Lorenc Puka	Results
60	$10,000 Pot Limit Omaha Hi-Lo 8 or Better Championship	237	Phil Galfond (1/3)	$567,790	Michael McKenna	Results
61	$1,000 WSOP.com Online No Limit Hold'em Championship	1,635	Ryan Tosoc (1/1)	$238,778	Anthony Maio	Results
62	$888 Crazy Eights No Limit Hold'em 8-Handed	8,598	Galen Hall (1/1)	$888,888	Eduards Kudrjavcevs	Results
63	$3,200 WSOP.com Online No Limit Hold'em High Roller	480	Chance Kornuth (1/2)	$341,598	David Goodman	Results
64	$10,000 Seven Card Stud Hi-Lo 8 or Better Championship	141	Dan Matsuzuki (1/1)	$364,387	Scott Bohlman (1/1)	Results
65	$10,000 No Limit Hold'em Main Event	7,874	John Cynn (1/1)	$8,800,000	Tony Miles	Results
66	$1,500 No Limit Hold'em	1,351	Longsheng Tan (1/1)	$323,472	Lanny Levine	Results
67	$1,500 Pot Limit Omaha Bounty	833	Anderson Ireland (1/1)	$141,161	Matt O'Donnell(0/1)	Results
68	$1,111 The Little One for One Drop No Limit Hold'em	4,732	Guoliang Wei (1/1)	$559,332	Francois Tosques	Results
69	$3,000 Pot Limit Omaha 6-Handed	901	Ronald Keijzer (1/1)	$475,033	Romain Lewis	Results
70	$3,000 Limit Hold'em 6-Handed	221	Yaser Al-Keliddar (1/1)	$154,338	Juha Helppi	Results
71	$5,000 No Limit Hold'em	452	Phil Hellmuth (1/15)	$485,082	Steven Wolansky (0/2)	Results
72	$1,500 Mixed No Limit Hold'em/Pot Limit Omaha 8-Handed	707	Jordan Polk (1/1)	$197,461	Fernando Brito	Results
73	$1,000 Double Stack No Limit Hold'em	1,221	Denis Timofeev (1/1)	$199,586	Leo Margets	Results
74	$10,000 Big Blind Antes No Limit Hold'em 6-Handed Championship	355	Shaun Deeb (2/4)	$814,179	Paul Volpe (1/3)	Results
75	$1,500 The Closer No Limit Hold'em	3,120	Joe Cada (2/4)	$612,886	Paawan Bansal	Results
76	$3,000 H.O.R.S.E.	354	Brian Hastings (1/4)	$233,202	Andrew Brown (0/1)	Results
77	$50,000 Big Blind Antes No Limit Hold'em High Roller	128	Ben Yu (1/3)	$1,650,773	Sean Winter	Results
78	$1,000,000 The Big One for One Drop No Limit Hold'em	27	Justin Bonomo (2/3)	$10,000,000	Fedor Holz (0/1)	Results

== Player of the Year ==
Final standings as of November 2 (end of WSOPE):

Standings
Rank	Name	Points	Bracelets
1	(United States) Shaun Deeb	5,050.01	2
2	(United States) Ben Yu	3,746.04	1
3	(United States) Joe Cada	3,531.86	2
4	(United States) John Hennigan	3,440.13	1
5	(United States) Scott Bohlman	3,155.88	1
6	(Australia) Michael Addamo	3,046.88	2
7	(United States) Paul Volpe	2,863.10	1
8	(United States) Anthony Zinno	2,593.34	0
9	(United States) Eric Baldwin	2,516.30	1
10	(France) Romain Lewis	2,460.14	0

== Main Event ==
The $10,000 No Limit Hold'em Main Event began on July 2 with the first of three starting flights. There were then 2 day 2 flights (AB and C) and then 5 more days of play before the final table. The final table began on July 12 and played out over three days, with the winner being determined on July 14.

The Main Event drew 7,874 players, the second-largest field in the tournament's history, generating a prize pool of $74,015,600. The top 1,182 players finished in the money. Each player at the final table earned $1,000,000, with the winner getting $8,800,000.

=== Performance of past champions ===
Name	Championship Year(s)	Day of Elimination
Tom McEvoy	1983	4 (430th)*
Johnny Chan	1987, 1988	4 (612th)*
Phil Hellmuth	1989	3
Dan Harrington	1995	2B
Scotty Nguyen	1998	3
Chris Ferguson	2000	3
Robert Varkonyi	2002	3
Chris Moneymaker	2003	1C
Greg Raymer	2004	1B
Joe Hachem	2005	2A
Jamie Gold	2006	1B
Jerry Yang	2007	1A
Joe Cada	2009	9 (5th)*
Jonathan Duhamel	2010	4 (409th)*
Greg Merson	2012	3
Ryan Riess	2013	2B
Martin Jacobson	2014	2C
Joe McKeehen	2015	2A
Qui Nguyen	2016	1A
Scott Blumstein	2017	1A

* Indicates the place of a player who finished in the money

=== Other notable high finishes ===
NB: This list is restricted to top 100 finishers with an existing Wikipedia entry.

Place	Name	Prize
23rd	Eric Froehlich	$282,630
41st	Brian Yoon	$189,165
46th	James Obst	$156,265

=== Final Table ===
2009 World Champion Joe Cada made the final table, finishing 5th, making him the first former champion to do so since Dan Harrington finished 4th in 2004. The final table bubble which saw Yueqi Zhu eliminated saw both him and then second place Antoine Labat turn over pocket Kings (Zhu K♥ K♠, Labat K♦ K♣) while Nicolas Manion turned over A♠ A♥. The board ran out 7♣ J♦ 4♣ 3♠ J♣, and Zhu was eliminated in 10th, while Labat was left crippled and Manion was propelled to the chip lead.

Heads up play between Tony Miles and John Cynn lasted for over 10 hours and 199 hands. This set the record for the largest number of hands played heads up during a WSOP Main Event final table. The final table lasted a total of 442 hands.

Name	Number of chips (percentage of total)	WSOP Bracelets	WSOP Cashes*	WSOP Earnings*
(United States) Nicolas Manion	112,775,000 (28.6%)	0	0	0
(United States) Michael Dyer	109,175,000 (27.7%)	0	3	$71,515
(United States) Tony Miles	42,750,000 (10.9%)	0	2	$6,396
(United States) John Cynn	37,075,000 (9.4%)	0	12	$713,071
(Australia) Alex Lynskey	25,925,000 (6.6%)	0	13	$553,429
(United States) Joe Cada	23,675,000 (6.0%)	3	33	$10,340,058
(United States) Aram Zobian	18,875,000 (4.8%)	0	3	$9,735
(Ukraine) Artem Metalidi	15,475,000 (3.9%)	0	25	$728,254
(France) Antoine Labat	8,050,000 (2.0%)	0	2	$6,857

*Career statistics prior to the beginning of the 2018 Main Event.

=== Final Table results ===
Place	Name	Prize
1st	John Cynn	$8,800,000
2nd	Tony Miles	$5,000,000
3rd	Michael Dyer	$3,750,000
4th	Nicolas Manion	$2,825,000
5th	Joe Cada	$2,150,000
6th	Aram Zobian	$1,800,000
7th	Alex Lynskey	$1,500,000
8th	Artem Metalidi	$1,250,000
9th	Antoine Labat	$1,000,000

== Big One for One Drop ==
The $1,000,000 Big One for One Drop began on July 15. It was the third time the event had been held. Antonio Esfandiari won $18.3 million in the first event in 2012, while Dan Colman was the $15.3 million champion in 2014. Elton Tsang won €11,111,111 in 2016 at Monte-Carlo One Drop Extravaganza in 2016, although since this event was not held at the WSOP, he did not receive a bracelet for it. The One Drop Foundation, founded by Guy Laliberte, received $80,000 from every buy-in. The 2018 event saw 27 players enter, generating a prize pool of $24,840,000. The top five players finished in the money, with the winner getting $10 million. Justin Bonomo won the tournament, and took over from Daniel Negreanu at the top of the all time money list with the victory.

=== Performance of past champions ===
Name	Championship Year(s)	Day of Elimination
Antonio Esfandiari	2012	1

=== Final Table ===
Place	Name	Prize
1st	Justin Bonomo	$10,000,000
2nd	Fedor Holz	$6,000,000
3rd	Dan Smith	$4,000,000
4th	Rick Salomon	$2,840,000
5th	Byron Kaverman	$2,000,000
6th	David Einhorn	$0
7th	Nick Petrangelo	$0
8th	Phil Ivey	$0
