= Kevin Song =

Korean-American poker player

World Series of Poker
- Bracelet: 1
- Money finishes: 41
- Highest WSOP Main Event finish: 20th, 2001

World Poker Tour
- Title: None
- Final table: None
- Money finishes: 6

Kevin Song is a Korean-American professional poker player who started playing poker since 1980 and began playing in poker tournaments since 1994 where he has cashed in many of them throughout his poker career, among them are 39 cashes at the World Series of Poker including winning the 1997 World Series of Poker $2,000 buy-in Limit Hold'em event.

== World Series of Poker ==
At the 1994 World Series of Poker (WSOP), his first cash at a WSOP event, Song made the final table and finished in 9th place in the $2,500 Limit Hold'em event won by Mike Laing. Three years later he won his first bracelet in the $2,000 Limit Hold'em event at the 1997 World Series of Poker, earning $397,120 in a final table that included other professional players like Dan Heimiller, Erik Seidel, Huck Seed, Berry Johnston and John Esposito. He has two WSOP second-place finishes. The first was at the $1,500 Limit Hold'em Shootout event of the 2004 World Series of Poker where he finished runner-up to Kathy Liebert, earning $58,300. He came in second again at the 2018 WSOP in the $1,500 Limit Hold'em event.

=== World Series of Poker bracelets ===
Year	Event	Prize Money
1997	$2,000 Limit Texas hold 'em	$397,120

== World Poker Tour ==
Song has finished in the money six times at the World Poker Tour (WPT), including placing 9th in the 2003 L.A. Poker Classic and 10th at the 2006 WPT World Poker Challenge.

== Other poker events ==
Some of Song's biggest cashes have been at a various poker events such as winning the $5,000 No Limit Hold'em Championship Event at the 1997 Hall of Fame Poker Classic, earning $184,000, winning the $2,000 No Limit Hold'em Championship Event at the 1999 Legends of Poker, earning $96,800, finishing in 3rd at the 2005 WSOP Circuit event at Harrah's Las Vegas, earning $110,638 that was won by Chris Ferguson, and Song won the $1,500 No Limit Hold'em event at the Fifth Annual Five Diamond World Poker Classic in 2006, earning $253,560.

As of 2023, his total live tournament winnings exceed $4,800,000.
