= Tony Miles (poker player) =

American poker player

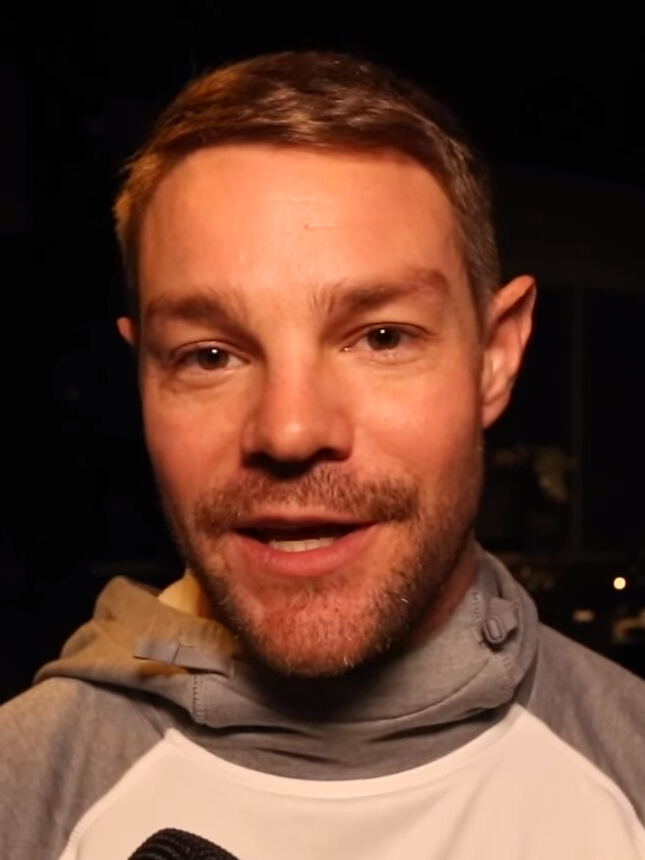
- Tony Miles in 2018

World Series of Poker
- Final table: 1
- Money finishes: 3
- Highest WSOP Main Event finish: 2nd, 2018

Tony Miles is an American professional poker player, originally from Ogden, Utah but now residing in Jacksonville, Florida. In 2018 he was runner-up at the World Series of Poker Main Event.

Miles attended Stadium High School in Tacoma, Washington and the University of North Florida. Prior to the Main Event, his largest career cash was for $18,000 at a WPT Regional Event in Jacksonville in 2011. He had two prior cashes at the WSOP, both in 2018. Miles suffered from alcohol and drug addiction in his past.

Miles qualified for the Main Event at bestbet Jacksonville. He entered the final table in third chip position and got to heads-up with John Cynn. On the 199nd hand of heads-up, and 442nd of the final table, Miles lost with Q♣ 8♥ to the K♣ J♣ of Cynn.

Miles was a contestant on American Ninja Warrior in 2019 and 2020.

As of 2018, his total live tournament winnings exceed $5 million.
