= John Cynn =

American poker player (born 1984)

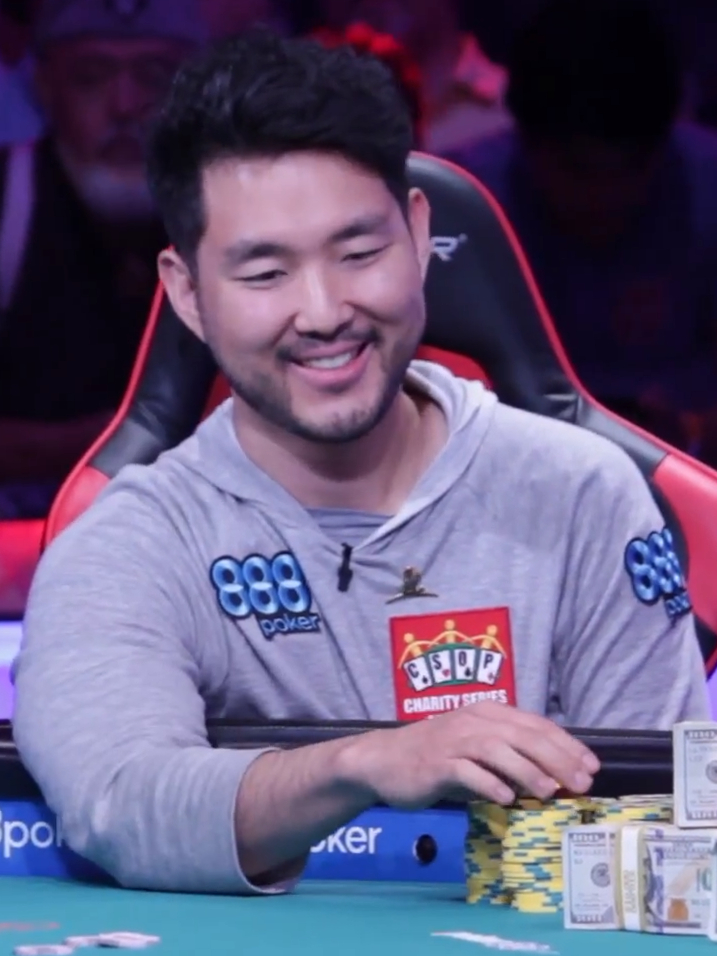
- Cynn in 2018
- Born: December 24, 1984 (age 41)

World Series of Poker
- Bracelet: 1
- Final table: 1
- Money finishes: 13
- Highest WSOP Main Event finish: Winner, 2018

World Poker Tour
- Money finishes: 3

John Cynn (born December 24, 1984) is an American professional poker player from Northbrook, Illinois. In 2018, he won the World Series of Poker (WSOP) Main Event for $8,800,000.

Cynn graduated from Indiana University Bloomington, where he studied finance and supply chain management. Prior to his poker career, he worked as an IT consultant in California. His first cash in a poker tournament came in 2010, while he first cashed in a WSOP event in 2012. In 2016, he finished 11th in the Main Event, earning $650,000. He had 12 WSOP cashes before the 2018 Main Event and three on the World Poker Tour, including a 10th-place finish at the L.A. Poker Classic in 2017.

At the 2018 Main Event, Cynn prevailed over a field of 7,874 players, the second-largest in WSOP history at that time. He defeated a final table that included 2009 champion Joe Cada, beating Tony Miles on the 442nd hand of the final table, and 199th of heads-up, when his K♣ J♣ beat the Q♣ 8♥ on a board of K♥ K♦ 5♥ 8♦ 4♠.

As of 2018, his total live tournament winnings exceed $9.7 million. His 13 cashes at the WSOP account for $9.5 million of those winnings.

== World Series of Poker bracelets ==
Year	Tournament	Prize (US$)
2018	$10,000 No Limit Hold'em Main Event	$8,800,000
