= Paul Volpe (poker player) =

American poker player (born 1981)

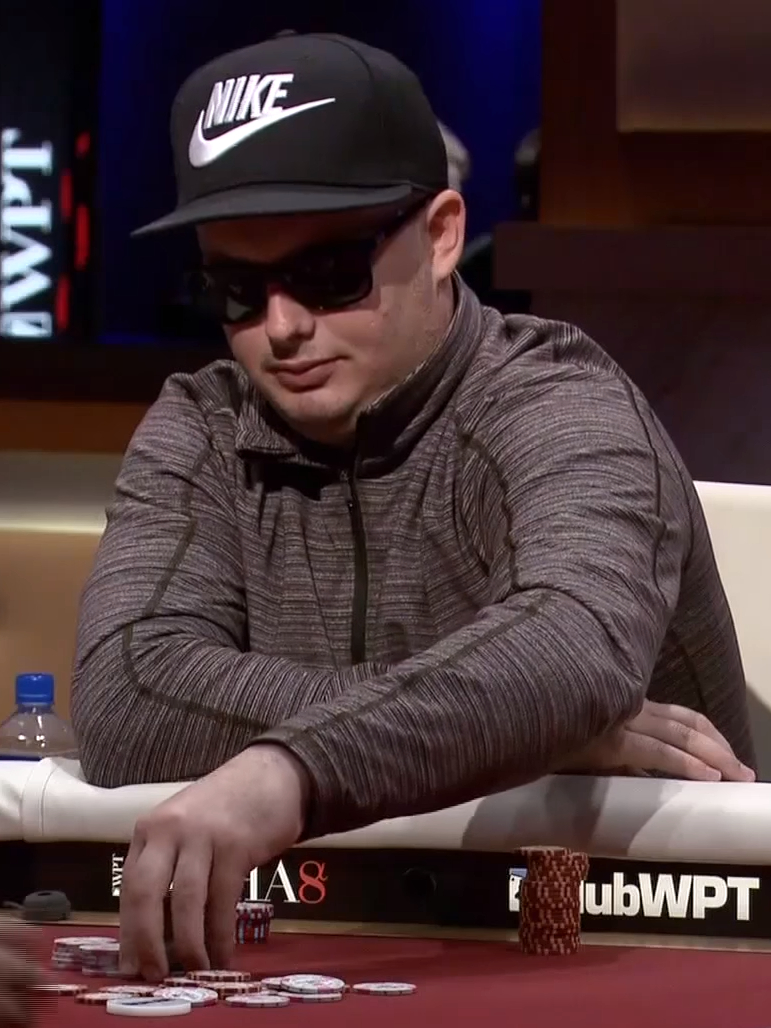
- Paul Volpe in 2015
- Born: 1981 (age 44–45); Philadelphia, Pennsylvania

World Series of Poker
- Bracelets: 3
- Final tables: 11
- Money finishes: 42
- Highest WSOP Main Event finish: 20th, 2012

World Poker Tour
- Final tables: 3
- Money finishes: 12

European Poker Tour
- Money finishes: 3

Paul Volpe (born 1981) is an American professional poker player from West Chester, Pennsylvania.

Volpe began playing online under the nickname "paulgees81," amassing winnings of more than $5 million. He won a MiniFTOPs event on Full Tilt Poker in 2009, as well as two Spring Championship of Online Poker (SCOOP) titles and a World Championship of Online Poker title on PokerStars.

Volpe's first cash at the World Series of Poker came in 2009. He has won three bracelets and made 11 final tables, earning nearly $3 million as of 2018. His first bracelet came in 2014 in the $10,000 2-7 Lowball Draw Championship. He added another bracelet in 2016 in a $1,500 Mixed Game event and a third in 2018 by taking down the $10,000 Omaha Hi-Lo Championship. Volpe has also made two deep runs in the WSOP Main Event, finishing in 20th in 2012 and 29th in 2016.

On the World Poker Tour, Volpe has made three final tables. He made two final tables in a row in 2013 at the L.A. Poker Classic and Bay 101 Shooting Star, finishing 2nd and 3rd, respectively.

As of June 2026, Volpe's live earnings exceed $10 million. His 42 WSOP cashes make up $2,900,000 of those winnings.

World Series of Poker bracelets
Year	Tournament	Prize (US$)
2014	$10,000 No Limit 2-7 Lowball Draw Championship	$253,524
2016	$1,500 8-Game Mix 6-Handed	$149,943
2018	$10,000 Omaha Hi-Lo 8 or Better Championship	$417,921
