= James Mackey (poker player) =

American poker player (born 1986)

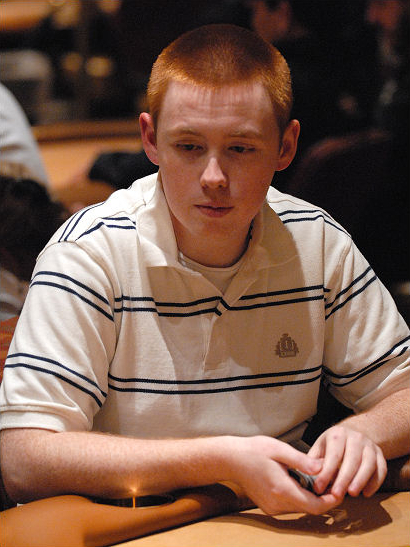
- Mackey at the $15,000 buy-in National Poker League's Vegas Open Championship in 2007.
- Nickname: mig.com
- Born: February 25, 1986 (age 40); Kansas City, Missouri, U.S.

World Series of Poker
- Bracelet: 1
- Final tables: 4
- Money finishes: 41
- Highest WSOP Main Event finish: 306th, 2019

World Poker Tour
- Title: 1
- Final tables: 2
- Money finishes: 9

James Corwin Mackey (born February 25, 1986) is an American professional poker player. He attended the University of Missouri before dropping out of a pre-med program to pursue a career in professional poker. In 2007, at 21 years and 4 months, Mackey became the third youngest poker player at the time to ever win a World Series of Poker bracelet, when he won the $5,000 buy-in No-Limit Hold'em event, behind Steve Billirakis (won a bracelet in the first event of the 2007 tournament) and Jeff Madsen (won a bracelet in the 2006 tournament).

== Early career ==
James Mackey started playing poker online in 2005 when he invested $75 in an online account. He turned that initial investment into $20,000 and decided to pursue a career professionally.

== World Series of Poker success ==
Mackey's near-record setting win (third youngest to win a bracelet), in the 2007 $5,000 buy-in No-Limit Hold'em event, came against a final table that included two players from the 2005 and 2006 Main Event, as well as two former bracelet winners. The final hand of the tournament was the famous 10-2 – the same hand that Doyle Brunson won back to back World Series of Poker Main Events with.

In the following year's tournament, Mackey finished runner-up in the $10,000 World Championship Mixed Event, earning $297,792.

== World Championship of Online Poker ==
On September 24, 2007, Mackey under the screen name mig.com won the PokerStars World Championship of Online Poker (WCOOP) $1050 buy-in event winning $580,212.50 and the WCOOP bracelet. This was the third biggest prize in the site's history.

As of 2020, James Mackey has live tournament winnings over $4,200,000. His 47 cashes at the WSOP account for $2,087,385 of those winnings.

== World Poker Tour success ==
During Season 15 of the World Poker Tour (WPT), Mackey won the 2016 WPT Choctaw tournament, with a top prize of $666,758. Prior to this win, Mackey had finished at the final table of two WPT Seminole Hard Rock Showdowns, winning $124,704 for a seventh-place finish in Season 9 and $441,128 for a third-place finish in Season 12.

== World Series of Poker bracelets ==
Year	Tournament	Prize (US$)
2007	$5,000 buy-in No-Limit Hold'em	$730,740
