= 2008 World Series of Poker results =

The 2008 World Series of Poker was the 39th annual World Series of Poker (WSOP). Held in Las Vegas, Nevada at the Rio All Suite Hotel and Casino, the 2008 series began on May 30 and featured 55 poker championships in several variants. All events but the $10,000 World Championship No Limit Texas hold 'em Main Event, the most prestigious of the WSOP events, ended by July 15. The final table, known as the November Nine, of the Main Event was suspended until November, to allow for better television coverage. As a WSOP custom since 1976, each of the event winners received a championship bracelet in addition to that event's prize money ranging from US$87,929 for the $500 Casino Employees No-Limit Hold'em to US$9,119,517 for the Main Event.

Most of the tournaments played at the WSOP are variants of Texas Hold 'em. Hold 'em is a community card game where each player may use any combination of the five community cards and the player's own two hole cards to make a poker hand, in contrast to poker variants such as stud or draw in which each player holds a separate individual hand. Between 2000 and 2009, hold'em has surpassed seven-card stud as the most common game in U.S. casinos, almost totally eclipsing the once popular game. Seven-card stud is a poker variant wherein each player is dealt two hole card, followed by four face up cards, and then another hidden card, with betting after each round. Another poker variant played is Omaha. Omaha is a version of poker wherein each player is dealt four hole cards and must use two of them in conjunction with three community cards to make the best possible five card hand. Other games played at the 2008 tournament included Razz, HORSE, and Deuce-to-Seven.

Within each of these poker variants a myriad of options exist. For example, depending on the betting structure, a tournament might be described as no limit, limit or pot-limit. Games may also include other variations on the rules governing the execution of the specific game such as shootout, eight or better, or heads up.

Highlights of the 2008 series include the selection of Erick Lindgren as the Player of the Year. Before the 2008 WSOP, Lindgren, who won a bracelet and made three final tables, was widely considered to be the "best player to never win a WSOP bracelet”. Phil Hellmuth, a Poker Hall of Famer, set new records for the most WSOP career cashes (68) and most WSOP career final tables (41). Nikolay Evdakov led all players with a record 10 money finishes. The Main Event, which began with 6,844 participants (a level exceeded only by the number of participants at the 2006 event), was suspended once the event was down to the nine players needed for the final table; the Main Event was resumed on November 9 and concluded with the heads-up final between Peter Eastgate and Ivan Demidov the next day. This year was the first in which the Main Event was suspended in this fashion, a change introduced at ESPN's request to allow the television network to do a same-day Main Event broadcast.

== Key ==
*	Elected to the Poker Hall of Fame
(#/#)	This denotes a bracelet winner. The first number is the number of bracelets won in the 2008 WSOP. The second number is the total number of bracelets won. Both numbers represent totals as of that point during the tournament.
Place	What place each player at the final table finished
Name	The player who made it to the final table
Prize (US$)	The amount of money awarded for each finish at the event's final table

== Results ==
=== Event 1: $10,000 World Championship Pot-Limit Hold'em ===
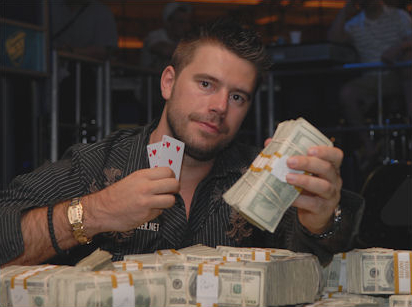
Medic after winning the $10,000 Pot-Limit Hold'em World Championship

- 3-Day Event: Friday May 30, 2008 to Sunday June 1, 2008
- Number of Entries: 352
- Total Prize Pool: $3,308,800
- Number of Payouts: 36
- Winning Hand: 7♥ 5♥
- References

Final Table
Place	Name	Prize
1st	Nenad Medic (1/1)	$794,112
2nd	Andy Bloch	$488,048
3rd	Kathy Liebert (0/1)	$306,064
4th	Mike Sexton (0/1)	$248,160
5th	Amit Makhija	$198,528
6th	Chris Bell	$157,168
7th	Patrik Antonius	$124,080
8th	Mike Sowers	$99,264
9th	Phil Laak	$74,448

=== Event 2: $1,500 No-Limit Hold'em ===
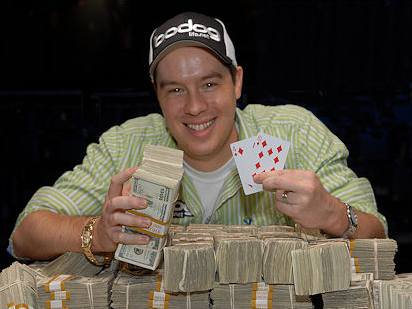
Hinkle after winning the $1,500 No Limit Hold'em

- 4-Day Event: Saturday May 31, 2008 to Tuesday June 3, 2008
- Number of Entries: 3929
- Total Prize Pool: $5,363,085
- Number of Payouts: 378
- Winning Hand: 10♦ 4♦
- Other: Broke the record for largest field in a tournament that was not the WSOP main event.
- References

Final Table
Place	Name	Prize
1st	Grant Hinkle (1/1)	$831,462
2nd	James Akenhead	$520,219
3rd	Chris Ferguson (0/5)	$388,287
4th	Theo Tran	$327,148
5th	Mike Ngo	$268,154
6th	Aaron Coulthard	$211,841
7th	Melvin Jones	$158,211
8th	David Bach	$117,987
9th	Joe Rutledge	$83,127

=== Event 3: $1,500 Pot-Limit Hold'em ===
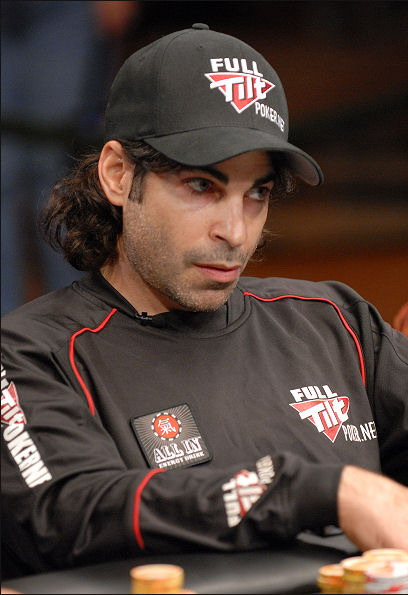
Singer at the $15,000 buy-in National Poker League Vegas Open Championship in 2007

- 3-Day Event: Monday June 2, 2008 to Wednesday June 4, 2008
- Number of Entries: 714
- Total Prize Pool: $973,245
- Number of Payouts: 72
- Winning Hand: Q♠ 4♠
- References

Final Table
Place	Name	Prize
1st	David Singer (1/1)	$214,131
2nd	Jacobo Fernandez	$136,643
3rd	Gregory Alston	$82,725
4th	Robert Lipkin	$67,640
5th	Russ Harriman	$55,474
6th	Joe Tehan	$43,796
7th	Zachary King	$34,063
8th	Al Barbieri	$26,764
9th	Glen Bean	$19,464

=== Event 4: $5,000 Mixed Hold'em (Limit/No-Limit) ===
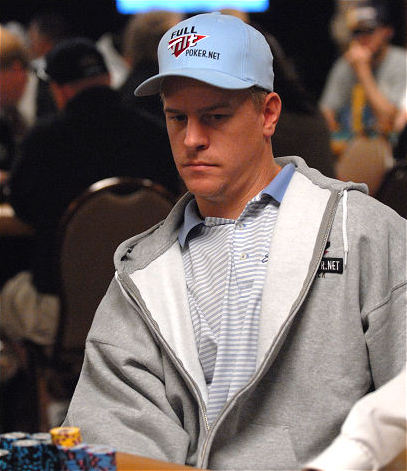
Lindgren at the World Series of Poker

- 3-Day Event: Monday June 2, 2008 to Wednesday June 4, 2008
- Number of Entries: 332
- Total Prize Pool: $1,560,400
- Number of Payouts: 36
- Winning Hand: A♥ 2♦
- References

Final Table
Place	Name	Prize
1st	Erick Lindgren (1/1)	$374,505
2nd	Justin Bonomo	$230,159
3rd	Andrew Robl	$144,337
4th	Roland De Wolfe	$117,030
5th	David Rheem	$93,624
6th	Howard Lederer (0/2)	$74,119
7th	David Williams (0/1)	$58,515
8th	Pat Pezzin	$46,812
9th	Isaac Haxton	$35,109

=== Event 5: $1,000 No-Limit Hold'em with Rebuys ===
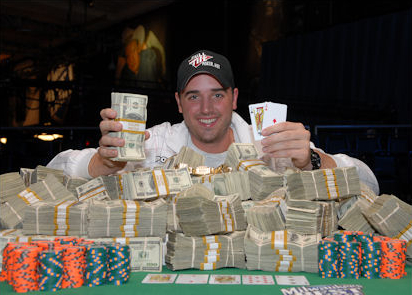
Banducci after winning the $1,000 No Limit Hold'em

- 3-Day Event: Tuesday June 3, 2008 to Thursday June 5, 2008
- Number of Entries: 766
- Number of Rebuys/Add-ons: 2,258
- Total Prize Pool: $2,894,094
- Number of Payouts: 72
- Winning Hand: A♦ J♣
- References

Final Table
Place	Name	Prize
1st	Michael Banducci (1/1)	$636,736
2nd	Jeff Williams	$406,330
3rd	Peter Gould	$245,997
4th	Lyric Duveyoung	$201,139
5th	Alan Jaffray	$164,963
6th	Jonathan Aguiar	$130,234
7th	Michael Binger	$101,293
8th	Jamie Rosen	$79,587
9th	Steve Gross	$57,881

=== Event 6: $1,500 Omaha Hi-Low Split-8 or Better ===
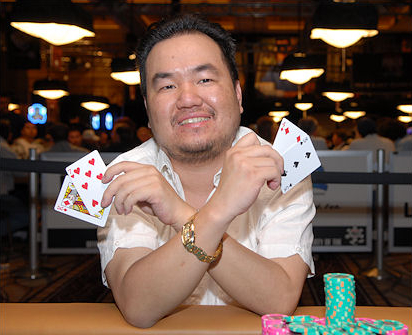
Luu after winning the $1,500 Omaha Hi-Low Split-8 or Better

- 3-Day Event: Tuesday June 3, 2008 to Thursday June 5, 2008
- Number of Entries: 833
- Total Prize Pool: $1,249,500
- Number of Payouts: 81
- Winning Hand: K♦ 4♦ 7♥ 3♠
- References

Final Table
Place	Name	Prize
1st	Thang Luu (1/1)	$243,356
2nd	Spencer Lawrence	$156,343
3rd	George Guzman	$93,806
4th	James Pritchard	$78,456
5th	Chris Falconer	$64,243
6th	Greg Jamison	$50,598
7th	Craig Sabel	$39,228
8th	Mark Wilds	$30,700
9th	Scott Clements (0/2)	$22,172

=== Event 7: $2,000 No-Limit Hold'em ===
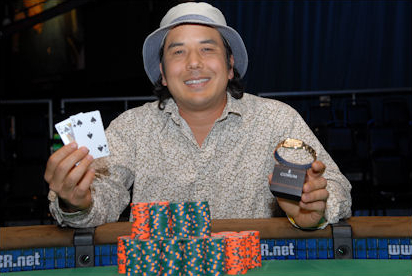
Keikoan after winning the $2,000 No Limit Hold'em

- 3-Day Event: Wednesday June 4, 2008 to Friday June 6, 2008
- Number of Entries: 1592
- Total Prize Pool: $2,897,440
- Number of Payouts: 153
- Winning Hand: 10♠ 6♥
- References

Final Table
Place	Name	Prize
1st	Matt Keikoan (1/1)	$550,601
2nd	Shannon Shorr	$349,141
3rd	Carter Gill	$228,897
4th	Theo Tran	$191,231
5th	Mihai Manole	$155,013
6th	Chris Björin (0/2)	$123,141
7th	J. C. Tran	$94,166
8th	Alex Bolotin	$72,436
9th	Mike Lisanti	$50,705

=== Event 8: $10,000 World Championship Mixed Event ===
- 3-Day Event: Wednesday June 4, 2008 to Friday June 6, 2008
- Number of Entries: 192
- Total Prize Pool: $1,804,800
- Number of Payouts: 24
- Winning Hand: A♠ K♥ (No-Limit Hold'em)
- References

Final Table
Place	Name	Prize
1st	Anthony Rivera (1/1)	$483,688
2nd	James Mackey (0/1)	$297,792
3rd	Matt Glantz	$184,992
4th	Michael DeMichele	$139,872
5th	Eli Elezra (0/1)	$108,288
6th	Sam Farha (0/2)	$85,728
7th	Tom Dwan	$67,680
8th	Jeff Madsen (0/2)	$54,144

Note: This event comprised eight poker variants played on a rotating format with one-hour long levels. Every eight hands the game alternated in the following order: Limit Deuce-to-Seven Triple Draw, Limit Hold'em, Limit Omaha Hi-Low Split-8 or Better, Razz, Seven-Card Stud, Seven-Card Stud-8 or Better, No-Limit Hold'em, Pot-Limit Omaha.

=== Event 9: $1,500 No-Limit Hold'em (Six-Handed) ===
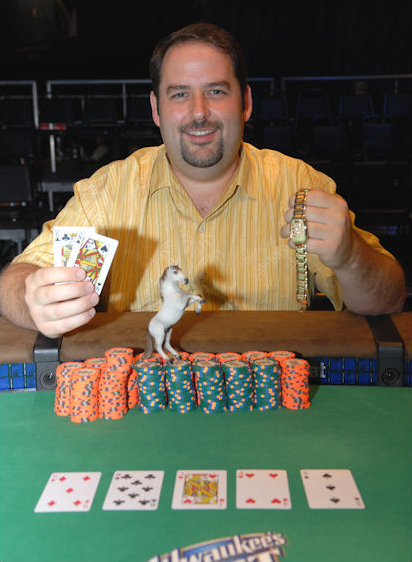
Porter after winning the $1,500 No-Limit Hold'em Six-Handed

- 3-Day Event: Thursday June 5, 2008 to Saturday June 7, 2008
- Number of Entries: 1,236
- Total Prize Pool: $1,687,410
- Number of Payouts: 126
- Winning Hand: K♣ Q♠
- References

Final Table
Place	Name	Prize
1st	Rep Porter (1/1)	$372,929
2nd	Nathan Templeton	$231,981
3rd	Devin Porter	$151,842
4th	John Conkright	$101,228
5th	Anatoly Shilyuk	$70,859
6th	Michiel Brummelhuis	$53,313

=== Event 10: $2,500 Omaha/Seven-Card Stud Hi-Low Split-8 or Better ===
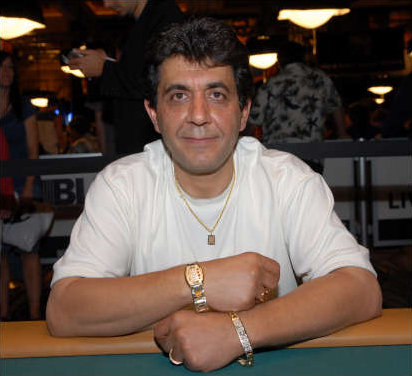
Rouhani after winning the $2,500 Omaha/Seven-Card Stud Hi-Low Split-8 or Better

- 3-Day Event: Thursday June 5, 2008 to Saturday June 7, 2008
- Number of Entries: 388
- Total Prize Pool: $892,400
- Number of Payouts: 40
- Winning Hand: 3♦ 8♣ 2♥ 9♠
- References

Final Table
Place	Name	Prize
1st	Freddy Rouhani (1/1)	$232,911
2nd	Tom Chambers	$142,784
3rd	John Cernuto (0/3)	$86,117
4th	Yueqi Zhu	$63,807
5th	Greg Pappas	$48,190
6th	John Racener	$37,481
7th	Daniel Mowczan	$28,557
8th	Michael Mizrachi	$24,095

=== Event 11: $5,000 No-Limit Hold'em Shootout ===
- 3-Day Event: Friday June 6, 2008 to Sunday June 8, 2008
- Number of Entries: 360
- Total Prize Pool: $1,692,000
- Number of Payouts: 36
- Winning Hand: A♦ J♣
- References

Final Table
Place	Name	Prize
1st	Phil Tom (1/1)	$477,990
2nd	Greg Mueller	$298,638
3rd	Leo Wolpert	$187,812
4th	Sirous Jamshidi	$118,440
5th	Tim West	$63,450
6th	Thomas Roupe	$38,070

=== Event 12: $1,500 Limit Hold'em ===
- 3-Day Event: Friday June 6, 2008 to Sunday June 8, 2008
- Number of Entries: 881
- Total Prize Pool: $1,201,200
- Number of Payouts: 81
- Winning Hand: 10♥ 3♥
- References

Final Table
Place	Name	Prize
1st	Jimmy Shultz (1/1)	$257,105
2nd	Zac Fellows	$165,165
3rd	Vinny Vinh	$99,099
4th	Brendan Taylor	$82,882
5th	Teddy Monroe	$67,867
6th	Markus Golser	$53,453
7th	Ali Eslami	$41,441
8th	Christoph Niesert	$32,432
9th	Chung Law	$23,423

=== Event 13: $2,500 No-Limit Hold'em ===
- 3-Day Event: Saturday June 7, 2008 to Monday June 9, 2008
- Number of Entries: 1,397
- Total Prize Pool: $3,213,100
- Number of Payouts: 99
- Winning Hand: A♠ A♣
- References

Final Table
Place	Name	Prize
1st	Duncan Bell (1/1)	$666,777
2nd	Steve Merrifield	$428,948
3rd	Nathan Doudney	$260,261
4th	Shawn Buchanan	$218,490
5th	Brent Hanks	$178,327
6th	Jason Sanders	$139,769
7th	Ariel Soffer	$107,638
8th	Brent Ditzik	$83,540
9th	Nicolas Levi	$59,442

=== Event 14: $10,000 World Championship Seven-Card Stud ===
- 3-Day Event: Saturday June 7, 2008 to Monday June 9, 2008
- Number of Entries: 158
- Total Prize Pool: $1,485,200
- Number of Payouts: 16
- Winning Hand: A♥ 5♠ 5♦ 3♦ A♦ 7♦ Q♦
- References

Final Table
Place	Name	Prize
1st	Eric Brooks (1/1)	$415,856
2nd	Fu Wong	$259,910
3rd	Alexander Kostritsyn	$163,372
4th	Minh Ly	$118,816
5th	Erik Seidel (0/8)	$92,825
6th	Jim Paluszek	$74,260
7th	David Oppenheim	$59,408
8th	Vassilios Lazarou	$48,269

=== Event 15: $1,000 Ladies No-Limit Hold'em World Championship ===
- 3-Day Event: Sunday June 8, 2008 to Tuesday June 10, 2008
- Number of Entries: 1,190
- Total Prize Pool: $1,082,900
- Number of Payouts: 99
- Winning Hand: K♠ K♣
- References

Final Table
Place	Name	Prize
1st	Svetlana Gromenkova (1/1)	$244,702
2nd	Anh Le	$144,567
3rd	Patty Till	$87,715
4th	Christine Priday	$73,637
5th	Marla Crumpler	$60,101
6th	Debbie Mitchell	$47,106
7th	Roslyn Quarto	$36,277
8th	Yesenia Garcia	$28,155
9th	Sue Porter	$20,034

=== Event 16: $2,000 Omaha Hi-Low Split-8 or Better ===
- 3-Day Event: Sunday June 8, 2008 to Tuesday June 10, 2008
- Number of Entries: 553
- Total Prize Pool: $1,002,820
- Number of Payouts: 54
- Winning Hand: 4♠ 5♦ J♥ 2♥
- References

Final Table
Place	Name	Prize
1st	Andrew Brown (1/1)	$226,483
2nd	Ted Forrest (0/5)	$143,420
3rd	Jim Pechac	$88,065
4th	Soheil Shamseddin	$71,961
5th	Kia Hooshmand	$58,877
6th	Ralph Perry (0/1)	$46,297
7th	Scott Clements (0/2)	$36,232
8th	Allan Enciso	$28,684
9th	Jimmy Fricke	$21,135

=== Event 17: $1,500 No-Limit Hold'em Shootout ===
- 2-Day Event: Monday June 9, 2008 to Tuesday June 10, 2008
- Number of Entries: 1,000
- Total Prize Pool: $1,370,596
- Number of Payouts: 100
- Winning Hand: A♣ J♦
- References

Final Table
Place	Name	Prize
1st	Jason Young (1/1)	$335,565
2nd	Mike Schwartz	$209,527
3rd	John Strzemp III	$129,675
4th	Rory Monahan	$82,582
5th	Matthew Giannetti	$40,267
6th	Kyle Bowker	$23,887
7th	Sergey Rybachenko	$15,697
8th	Thomas West	$12,421
9th	Alexander Triner	$9,828
10th	Casey Coleman	$7,507

=== Event 18: $5,000 No-Limit Deuce-to-Seven Draw Lowball with Rebuys ===
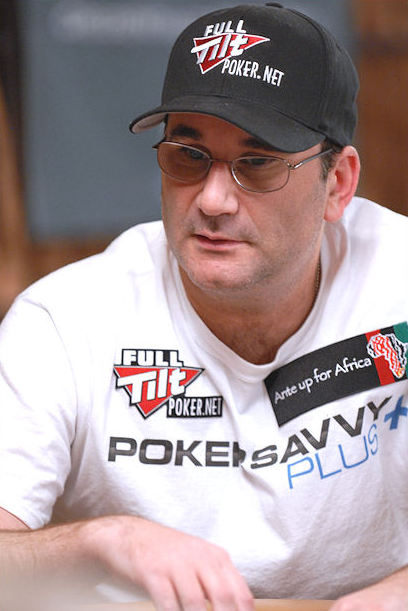
Mike Matusow at the 2008 World Series of Poker

- 3-Day Event: Monday June 9, 2008 to Wednesday June 11, 2008
- Number of Entries: 85
- Number of Rebuys/Add-ons: 272
- Total Prize Pool: $1,735,020
- Number of Payouts: 14
- Winning Hand: Q♥ 8♥ 7♣ 4♠ 3♦
- References

Final Table
Place	Name	Prize
1st	Mike Matusow (1/3)	$537,862
2nd	Jeff Lisandro (0/1)	$347,004
3rd	Barry Greenstein (0/2)	$225,552
4th	Erick Lindgren (1/1)	$156,151
5th	Tom Schneider (0/2)	$104,101
6th	Tony G	$78,075
7th	David Benyamine	$58,990

=== Event 19: $1,500 Pot-Limit Omaha ===
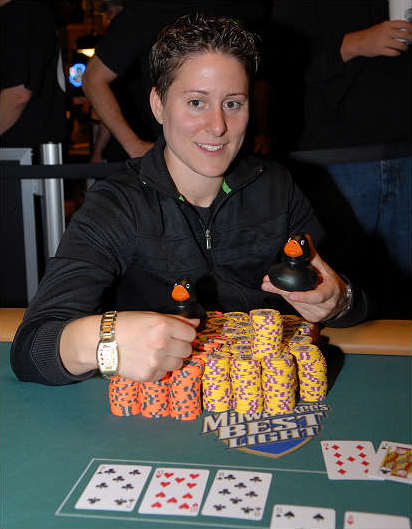
Selbst after winning the $1,500 Pot-Limit Omaha

- 3-Day Event: Tuesday June 10, 2008 to Thursday June 12, 2008
- Number of Entries: 759
- Total Prize Pool: $1,036,035
- Number of Payouts: 72
- Winning Hand: 9♦ 2♣ J♠ J♣
- References

Final Table
Place	Name	Prize
1st	Vanessa Selbst (1/1)	$227,965
2nd	Jamie Pickering	$145,459
3rd	Stanley Statkiewicz	$88,062
4th	Thom Schultz	$72,004
5th	Eugene Todd	$59,053
6th	Craig Natte	$46,621
7th	Mel Randolph	$36,261
8th	Jamie Robbins	$28,490
9th	Ken Lairson	$20,720

=== Event 20: $2,000 Limit Hold'em ===
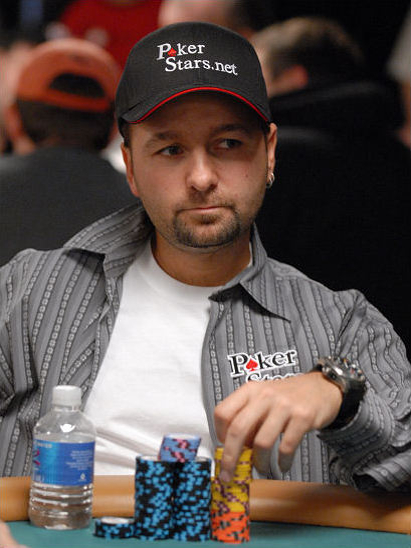
Negreanu at the 2007 World Series of Poker

- 3-Day Event: Tuesday June 10, 2008 to Thursday June 12, 2008
- Number of Entries: 480
- Total Prize Pool: $873,600
- Number of Payouts: 45
- Winning Hand: 9♠ 5♥
- References

Final Table
Place	Name	Prize
1st	Daniel Negreanu (1/4)	$204,874
2nd	Ugur Marangoz	$126,671
3rd	David Baker	$78,624
4th	Richard Li	$63,335
5th	Fu Wong	$51,542
6th	Jeremy Kottler	$40,622
7th	Greg Wohletz	$31,886
8th	Derek Lerner	$25,334
9th	Hien Tran	$18,782

=== Event 21: $5,000 No-Limit Hold'em ===
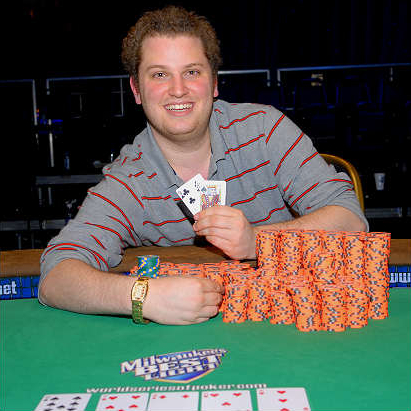
Seiver at the 2008 World Series of Poker

- 3-Day Event: Wednesday June 11, 2008 to Friday June 13, 2008
- Number of Entries: 731
- Total Prize Pool: $3,435,700
- Number of Payouts: 72
- Winning Hand: K♠ 9♣
- References

Final Table
Place	Name	Prize
1st	Scott Seiver (1/1)	$755,891
2nd	Dave Seidman	$482,372
3rd	Ben Sprengers	$292,034
4th	Jacobo Fernandez	$238,781
5th	Rajesh Vohra	$195,834
6th	Chuck Sklar	$154,606
7th	Anders Henriksson	$120,249
8th	Adam Geyer	$94,481
9th	Scott Freeman	$68,714

=== Event 22: $3,000 H.O.R.S.E. ===
- 3-Day Event: Wednesday June 11, 2008 to Friday June 13, 2008
- Number of Entries: 414
- Total Prize Pool: $1,142,640
- Number of Payouts: 40
- Winning Hand: 5♦ 5♣ 7♣ A♣ J♥ J♦ (Stud)
- References

Final Table
Place	Name	Prize
1st	Jens Voertmann (1/1)	$298,253
2nd	Doug Ganger	$182,822
3rd	Marcel Lüske	$110,264
4th	Hoyt Corkins (0/2)	$81,698
5th	Jared Davis	$61,702
6th	Steve Zolotow (0/2)	$47,990
7th	Rostislav Tsodikov	$36,564
8th	Jennifer Harman (0/2)	$30,851

=== Event 23: $2,000 No-Limit Hold'em ===
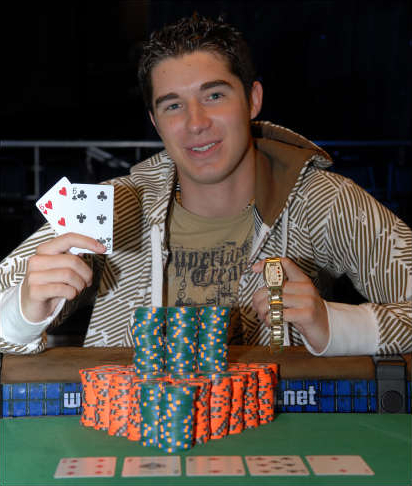
Blair Hinkle after he won the $2,000 No-Limit Hold'em

- 3-Day Event: Thursday June 12, 2008 to Saturday June 14, 2008
- Number of Entries: 1,344
- Total Prize Pool: $2,446,080
- Number of Payouts: 99
- Winning Hand: 6♥ 6♣
- References

Final Table
Place	Name	Prize
1st	Blair Hinkle (1/1)	$507,563
2nd	Mark Brockington	$326,552
3rd	Daniel O'Brien	$198,132
4th	David Steicke	$166,333
5th	Dustin Dirksen	$135,757
6th	Chris Björin (0/2)	$106,404
7th	Dominik Kulicki	$81,944
8th	Andrew Jeffreys	$63,598
9th	Stephane Tayar	$45,252

=== Event 24: $2,500 Pot-Limit Hold'em/Omaha ===
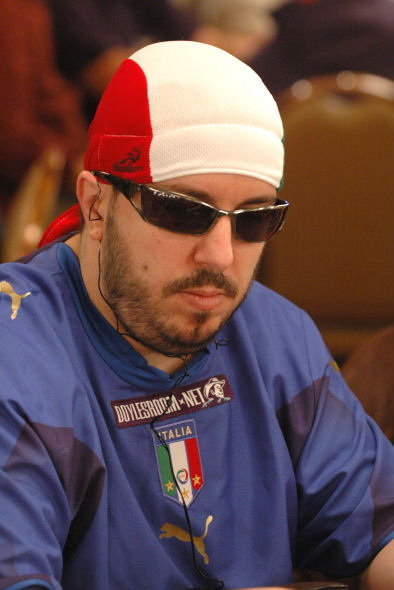
Max Pescatori at the 2006 World Series of Poker

- 3-Day Event: Thursday June 12, 2008 to Saturday June 14, 2008
- Number of Entries: 457
- Total Prize Pool: $1,051,100
- Number of Payouts: 45
- Winning Hand: K♥ J♥ 8♣ 7♠
- References

Final Table
Place	Name	Prize
1st	Max Pescatori (1/2)	$246,471
2nd	Kyle Kloeckner	$152,410
3rd	Greg Hurst	$94,599
4th	Allen Cunningham (0/5)	$76,205
5th	Kyle Hegeman	$62,015
6th	Jonathan Depa	$48,876
7th	Lennart Holtkamp	$38,365
8th	Minh Ly	$30,482
9th	J.P. Kelly	$22,599

=== Event 25: $10,000 World Championship Heads Up No-Limit Hold'em ===
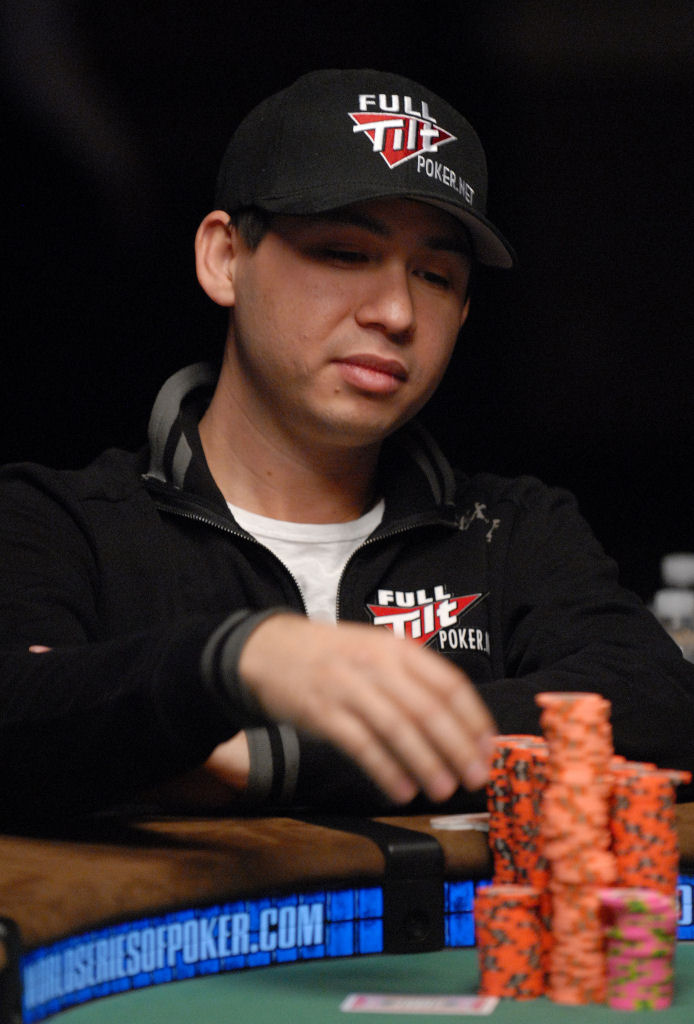
Kenny Tran at the 2007 World Series of Poker

- 3-Day Event: Friday June 13, 2008 to Sunday June 15, 2008
- Number of Entries: 256
- Total Prize Pool: $2,406,400
- Number of Payouts: 64
- Winning Hand: A♣ 8♣
- References

Top Finishers
Place	Name	Prize
1st	Kenny Tran (1/1)	$539,056
2nd	Alec Torelli	$336,896
SF	Vanessa Selbst (1/1)	$108,288
SF	Jonathan Jaffe	$108,288
QF	Lyle Berman* (0/3)	$54,144
QF	Brandon Adams	$54,144
QF	Gavin Griffin (0/1)	$54,144
QF	Robert Mizrachi (0/1)	$54,144

=== Event 26: $1,500 Razz ===
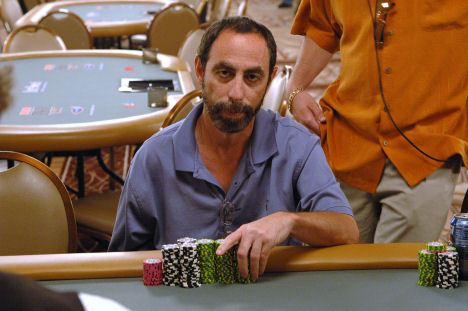
Barry Greenstein in the 2006 World Series of Poker

- 3-Day Event: Friday June 13, 2008 to Sunday June 15, 2008
- Number of Entries: 453
- Total Prize Pool: $618,345
- Number of Payouts: 48
- Winning Hand: J-9-7-4-A-9-4
- References

Final Table
Place	Name	Prize
1st	Barry Greenstein (1/3)	$157,619
2nd	Chris Klodnicki	$97,389
3rd	Chris Viox	$58,743
4th	Mark Tenner	$43,284
5th	Brandon Leeds	$33,081
6th	Joseph Michael	$25,661
7th	Archie Karas	$19,478
8th	Mike Wattel	$16,386

=== Event 27: $1,500 No-Limit Hold'em ===
- 3-Day Event: Saturday June 14, 2008 to Monday June 16, 2008
- Number of Entries: 2,706
- Total Prize Pool: $3,693,690
- Number of Payouts: 270
- Winning Hand: A♠ J♣
- References

Final Table
Place	Name	Prize
1st	Vitaly Lunkin (1/1)	$628,417
2nd	Brett Kimes	$387,837
3rd	Bobby Firestone	$277,026
4th	Kenneth Terrell	$232,702
5th	Trevor Donaldson	$190,225
6th	Richard Alm	$149,594
7th	Barry Schultz	$112,657
8th	Robert Brown	$84,954
9th	Phil Yeh	$57,990

=== Event 28: $5,000 Pot-Limit Omaha with Rebuys ===
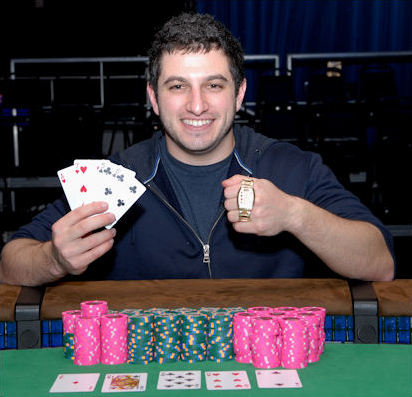
Galfond after winning the $5,000 Pot-Limit Omaha w/Rebuys

- 3-Day Event: Saturday June 14, 2008 to Monday June 16, 2008
- Number of Entries: 152
- Number of Rebuys/Add-ons: 483
- Total Prize Pool: $3,085,930
- Number of Payouts: 18
- Winning Hand: A♥ 7♥ 6♣ 5♣
- References

Final Table
Place	Name	Prize
1st	Phil Galfond (1/1)	$817,781
2nd	Adam Hourani	$493,748
3rd	David Benyamine	$316,307
4th	Johnny Chan* (0/10)	$246,874
5th	Kirill Gerasimov	$192,870
6th	John Juanda (0/3)	$154,296
7th	Daniel Negreanu (1/4)	$123,437
8th	Phil Hellmuth* (0/11)	$100,292
9th	Brian Rast	$84,863

=== Event 29: $3,000 No-Limit Hold'em ===
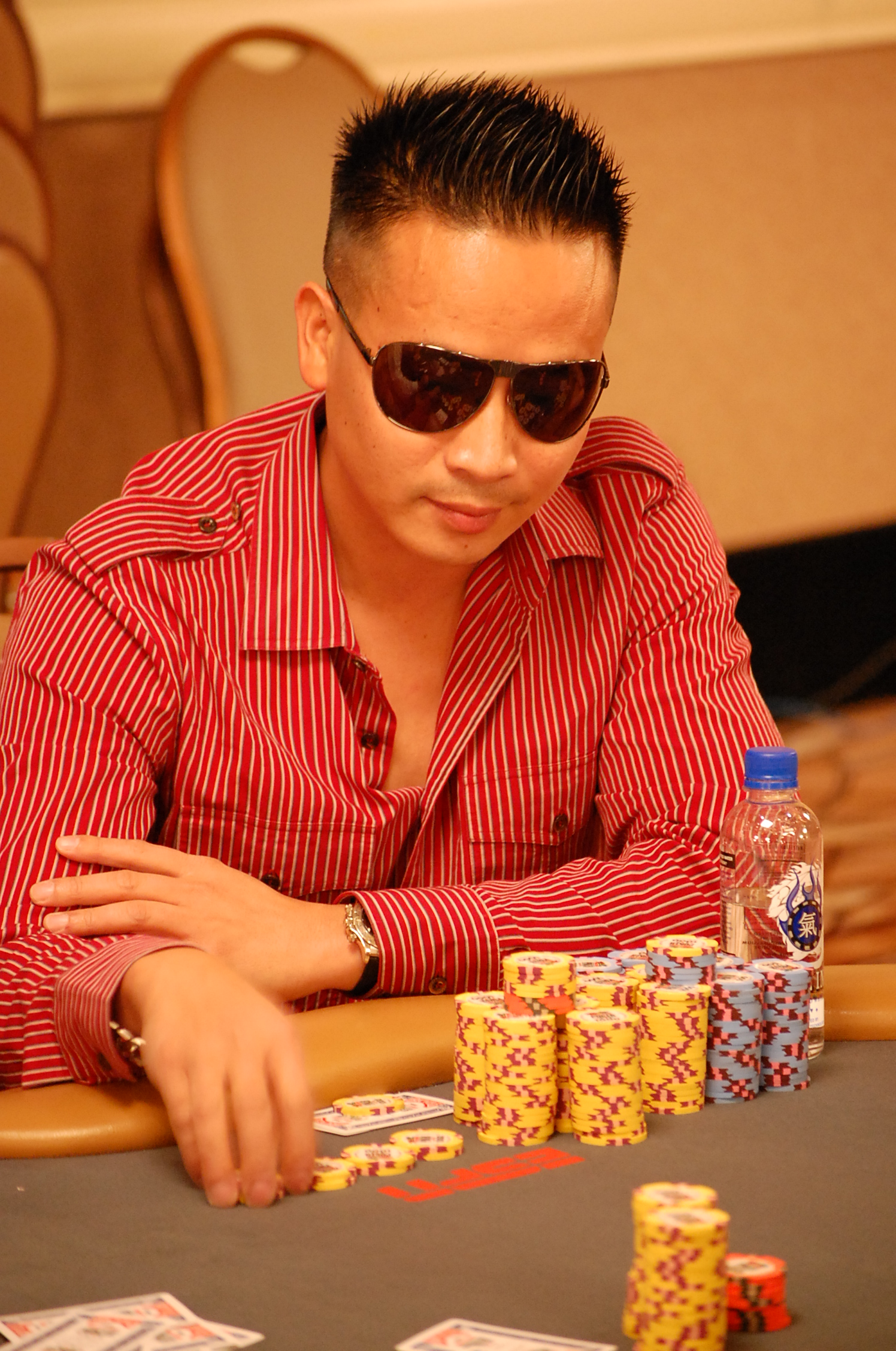
Phan at the 2008 World Series of Poker

- 3-Day Event: Sunday June 15, 2008 to Tuesday June 17, 2008
- Number of Entries: 716
- Total Prize Pool: $1,976,160
- Number of Payouts: 72
- Winning Hand: A♥ 9♠
- References

Final Table
Place	Name	Prize
1st	John Phan (1/1)	$434,789
2nd	Johnny Neckar	$277,452
3rd	Matthew Vengrin	$167,973
4th	Alex Bolotin	$137,343
5th	David Singer (1/1)	$112,641
6th	Stewart Newman	$88,927
7th	Thuyen Doan	$69,165
8th	Tony Dunst	$54,344
9th	Sebastian Segovia	$39,523

=== Event 30: $10,000 World Championship Limit Hold'em ===
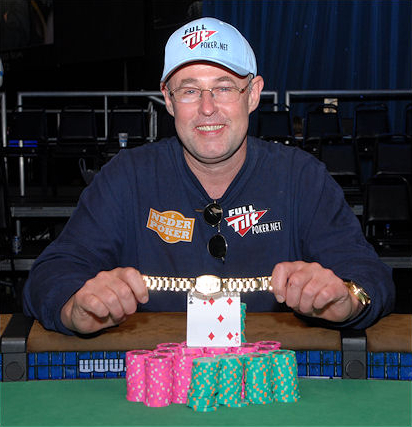
Hollink after winning the $10,000 Limit Hold'em World Championship

- 3-Day Event: Sunday June 15, 2008 to Tuesday June 17, 2008
- Number of Entries: 218
- Total Prize Pool: $2,049,200
- Number of Payouts: 27
- Winning Hand: A♣ 5♦
- References

Final Table
Place	Name	Prize
1st	Rob Hollink (1/1)	$496,931
2nd	Jerrod Ankenman	$307,380
3rd	Tommy Hang	$194,674
4th	Aaron Katz	$158,813
5th	J. C. Tran	$128,075
6th	Brock Parker	$102,460
7th	Andy Bloch	$81,968
8th	Cy Jassinowsky	$66,599
9th	Chris Vitch	$51,230

=== Event 31: $2,500 No-Limit Hold'em (Six-Handed) ===
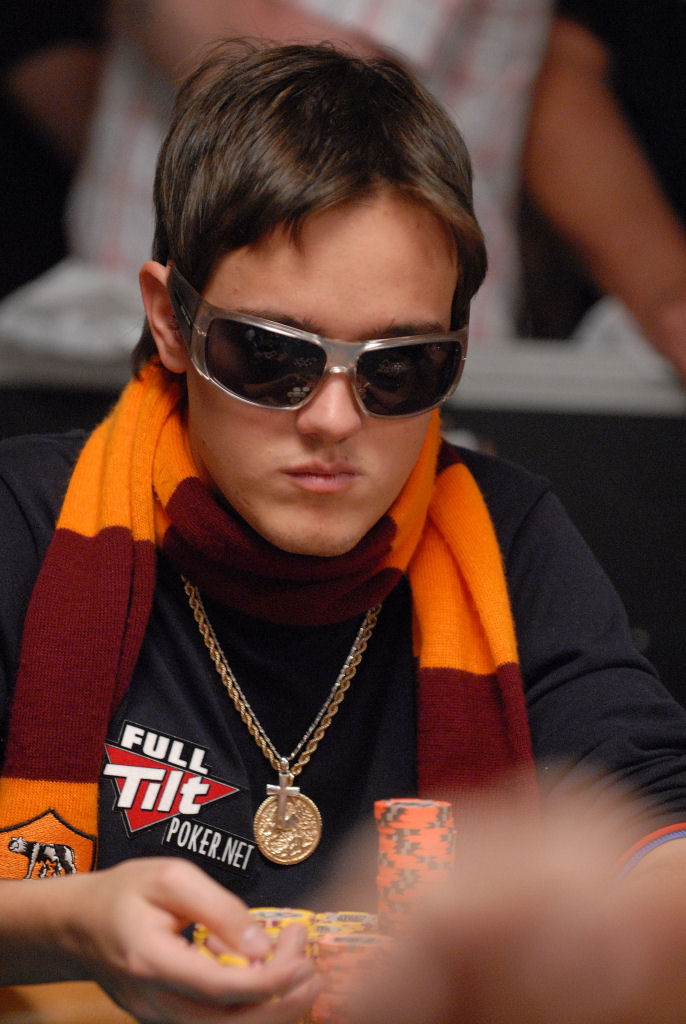
Minieri at the 2007 World Series of Poker

- 3-Day Event: Monday June 16, 2008 to Wednesday June 18, 2008
- Number of Entries: 1,012
- Total Prize Pool: $2,327,600
- Number of Payouts: 108
- Winning Hand: Q♦ Q♠
- References

Final Table
Place	Name	Prize
1st	Dario Minieri (1/1)	$528,418
2nd	Seth Fischer	$330,519
3rd	Justin Filtz	$214,139
4th	Kevin Song (0/1)	$141,983
5th	John O'Shea	$98,923
6th	Stuart Marshak	$73,784

=== Event 32: $1,500 No-Limit Hold'em ===
- 3-Day Event: Tuesday June 17, 2008 to Thursday June 19, 2008
- Number of Entries: 2,304
- Total Prize Pool: $3,144,960
- Number of Payouts: 198
- Winning Hand: A♦ 7♥
- References

Final Table
Place	Name	Prize
1st	Luis Velador (1/1)	$573,734
2nd	Chris Signore	$366,387
3rd	Osmin Dardon	$243,734
4th	Jae Chung	$204,422
5th	Shane Stacey	$166,682
6th	Dean Bui	$132,088
7th	Dany Georges	$100,638
8th	Utsab Saha	$77,051
9th	Justin Hoffman	$53,464

=== Event 33: $5,000 World Championship Seven-Card Stud Hi-Low Split-8 or Better ===
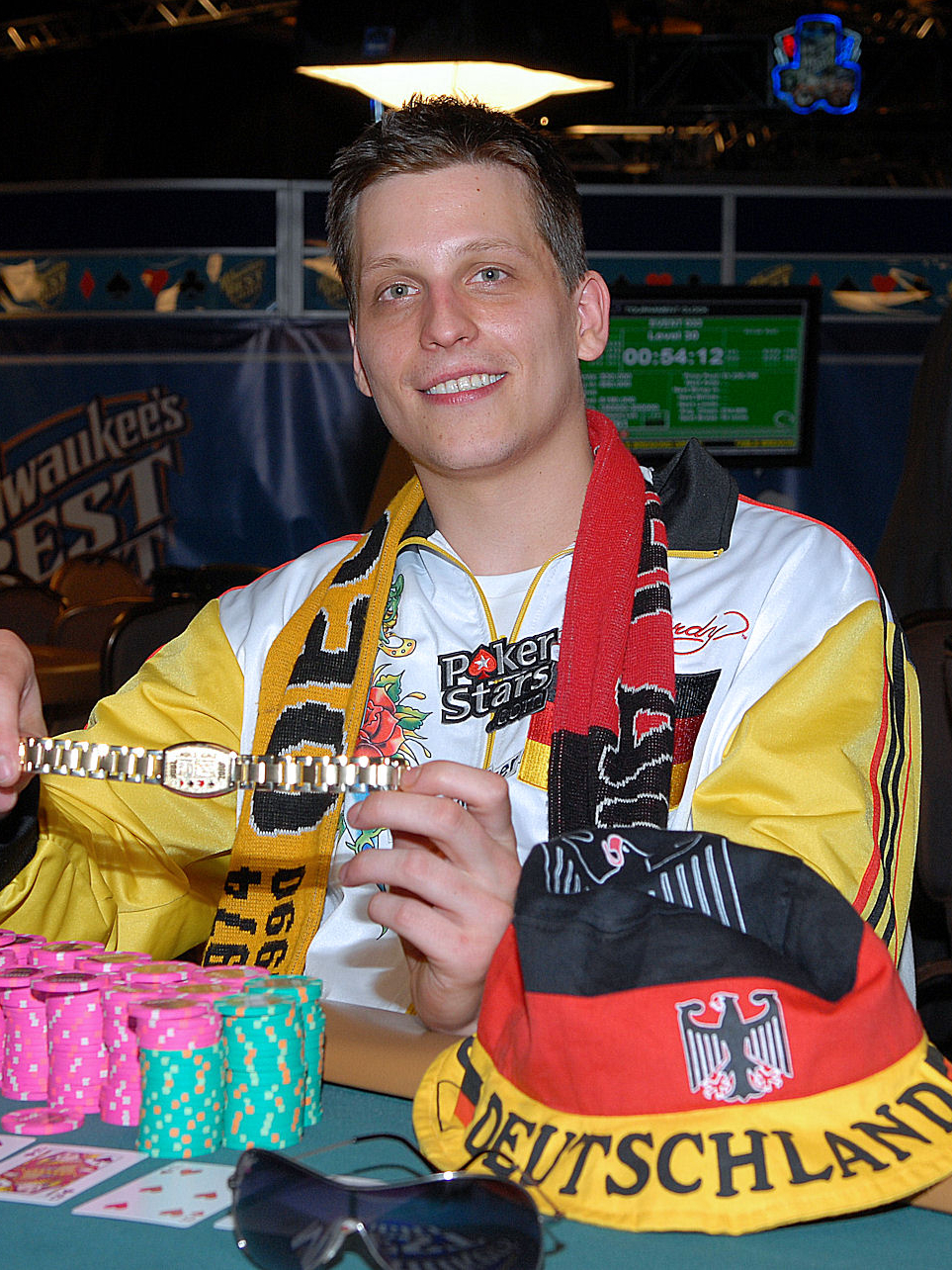
Ruthenberg after winning the $5,000 Seven Card Stud Hi-Low World Championship

- 3-Day Event: Tuesday June 17, 2008 to Thursday June 19, 2008
- Number of Entries: 261
- Total Prize Pool: $1,226,700
- Number of Payouts: 24
- Winning Hand: 6♥ 2♦ 7♣ 4♠ Q♠ 4♦ 7♦ (two-pair no low)
- References

Final Table
Place	Name	Prize
1st	Sebastian Ruthenberg (1/1)	$328,756
2nd	Chris Ferguson (0/5)	$202,406
3rd	Bob Lauria	$125,737
4th	Marcel Lüske	$95,069
5th	Annie Duke (0/1)	$73,602
6th	Alessio Isaia	$58,268
7th	Steve Sung	$46,001
8th	Bob Beveridge	$36,801

=== Event 34: $1,500 Pot-Limit Omaha w/Rebuys ===
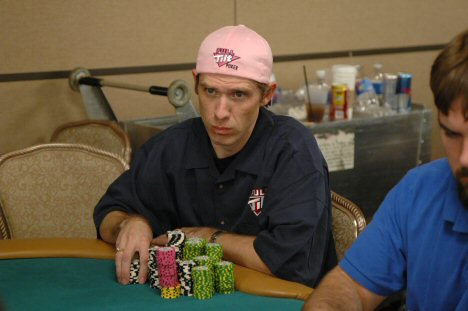
Layne Flack at the 2005 World Series of Poker

- 3-Day Event: Wednesday June 18, 2008 to Friday June 20, 2008
- Number of Entries: 320
- Number of Rebuys/Add-ons: 1,350
- Total Prize Pool: $2,407,125
- Number of Payouts: 36
- Winning Hand: K♣ K♥ J♥ 2♠
- References

Final Table
Place	Name	Prize
1st	Layne Flack (1/6)	$577,725
2nd	Daniel Makowsky	$355,050
3rd	Jacobo Fernandez	$222,659
4th	Dario Alioto (0/1)	$180,534
5th	Ted Forrest (0/5)	$144,427
6th	Kyle Kloeckner	$114,338
7th	Michael Guzzardi	$90,267
8th	Tim West	$72,213
9th	Frank Vizza	$54,160

=== Event 35: $1,500 Seven-Card Stud ===
- 3-Day Event: Wednesday June 18, 2008 to Friday June 20, 2008
- Number of Entries: 381
- Total Prize Pool: $510,705
- Number of Payouts: 40
- Winning Hand: K♦ K♥ Q♥ 8♠ 7♥ 2♣ A♦
- References

Final Table
Place	Name	Prize
1st	Mike Rocco (1/1)	$135,753
2nd	Al Barbieri	$83,210
3rd	Levon Torosyan	$50,186
4th	Max Troy	$37,184
5th	Giacomo D'Agostino	$28,083
6th	Danny Kalpakis	$21,842
7th	Andre Boyer (0/1)	$16,642
8th	Jeffrey Siegal	$14,041

=== Event 36: $1,500 No-Limit Hold'em ===
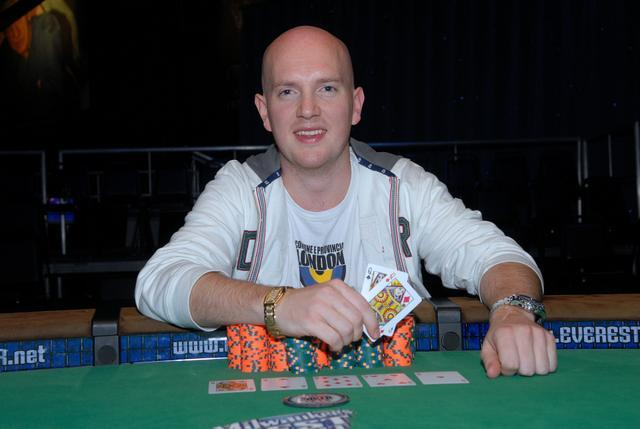
Hougaard after winning the $1,500 No-Limit Hold'em

- 3-Day Event: Thursday June 19, 2008 to Saturday June 21, 2008
- Number of Entries: 2,447
- Total Prize Pool: $3,340,155
- Number of Payouts: 198
- Winning Hand: Q♠ Q♦
- References

Final Table
Place	Name	Prize
1st	Jesper Hougaard (1/1)	$610,304
2nd	Cody Slaubaugh	$389,128
3rd	Aaron Kanter	$258,862
4th	Danny Wong	$217,110
5th	Doug Middleton	$177,028
6th	Justin Wald	$140,286
7th	Rick Solis	$106,884
8th	Owen Crowe	$81,833
9th	John Shipley	$56,782

=== Event 37: $10,000 World Championship Omaha Hi-Low Split-8 or Better ===
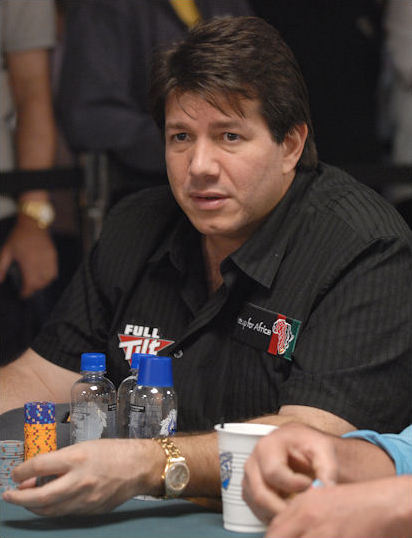
David Benyamine at the 2008 World Series of Poker

- 3-Day Event: Thursday June 19, 2008 to Saturday June 21, 2008
- Number of Entries: 235
- Total Prize Pool: $2,209,000
- Number of Payouts: 27
- Winning Hand: 10♣ 10♥ Q♣ 3♥
- References

Final Table
Place	Name	Prize
1st	David Benyamine (1/1)	$535,687
2nd	Greg Jamison	$331,350
3rd	Jason Gray	$209,855
4th	Toto Leonidas (0/1)	$171,197
5th	Mike Matusow (1/3)	$138,062
6th	Eugene Katchalov	$110,450
7th	Ram Vaswani (0/1)	$88,360
8th	David Chiu (0/4)	$71,792
9th	Tony Ma (0/2)	$55,225

=== Event 38: $2,000 Pot-Limit Hold'em ===
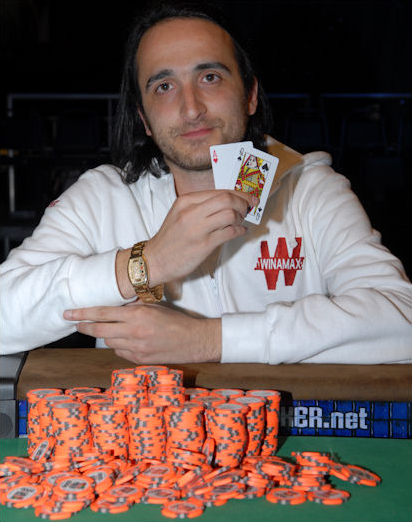
Davidi Kitai after his win at the 2008 World Series of Poker

- 3-Day Event: Friday June 20, 2008 to Sunday June 22, 2008
- Number of Entries: 605
- Total Prize Pool: $1,101,100
- Number of Payouts: 63
- Winning Hand: A♦ Q♠
- References

Final Table
Place	Name	Prize
1st	Davidi Kitai (1/1)	$244,546
2nd	Chris Bell	$155,806
3rd	Keith Greer	$94,695
4th	Jan Von Halle	$77,077
5th	Lee Watkinson (0/1)	$63,313
6th	Robert Cheung (0/1)	$50,100
7th	Ayaz Mahmood	$39,089
8th	Ben Roberts	$30,831
9th	Michael Greco	$22,573

=== Event 39: $1,500 No-Limit Hold'em ===
- 3-Day Event: Saturday June 21, 2008 to Monday June 23, 2008
- Number of Entries: 2,720
- Total Prize Pool: $3,712,800
- Number of Payouts: 270
- Winning Hand: 10♥ 10♦
- References

Final Table
Place	Name	Prize
1st	David Woo (1/1)	$631,656
2nd	Matt Wood	$389,844
3rd	Eric Beren	$278,460
4th	Habib Khanis	$233,906
5th	Thom Werthmann	$191,209
6th	Curtis Early	$150,368
7th	Thanh Dat Tran	$113,240
8th	Mike Glasser	$85,394
9th	Jim Paras	$58,290

=== Event 40: $2,500 Limit Deuce-to-Seven Triple Draw ===
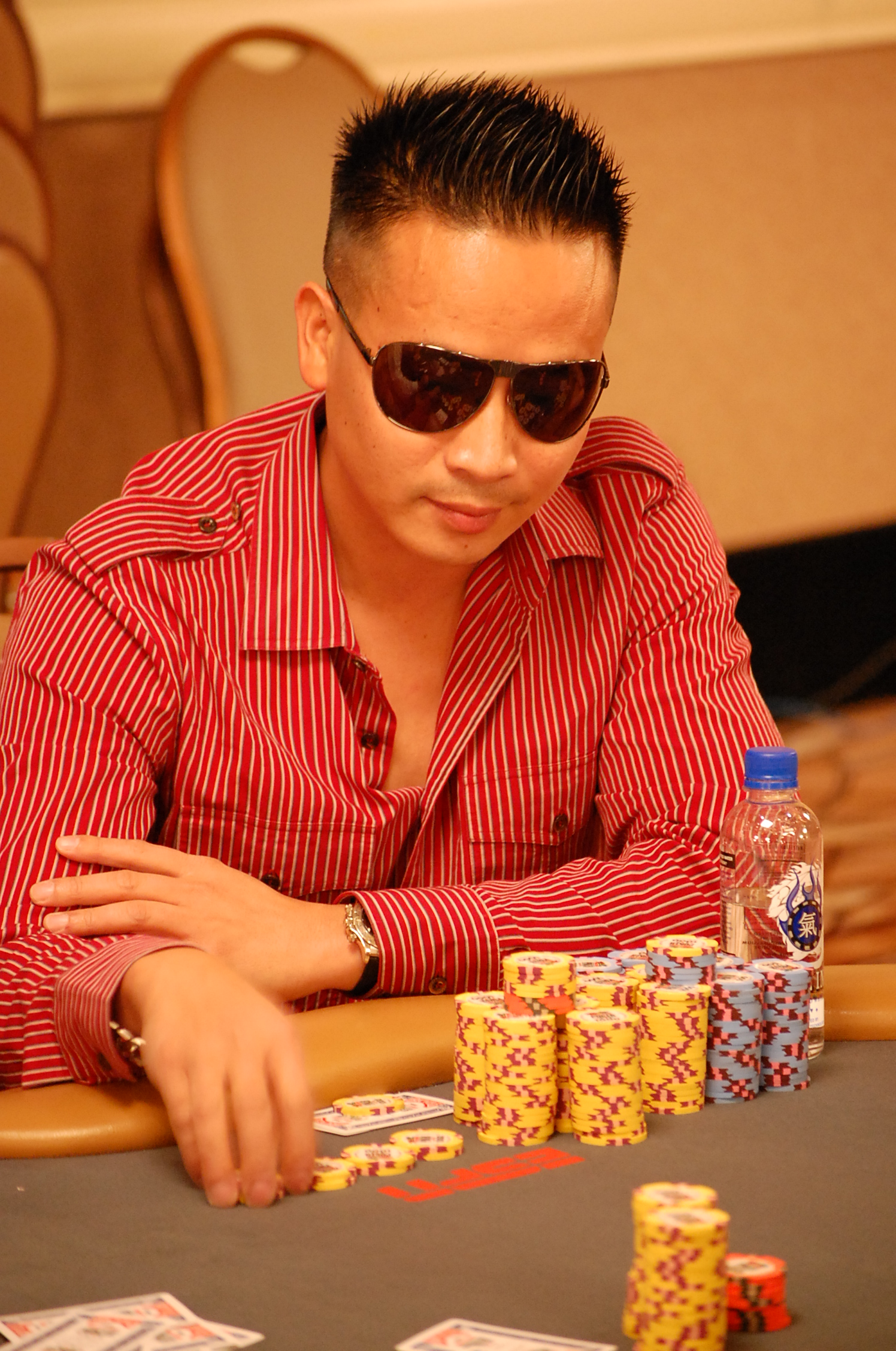
Phan at the 2008 World Series of Poker

- 3-Day Event: Sunday June 22, 2008 to Tuesday June 24, 2008
- Number of Entries: 238
- Total Prize Pool: $547,400
- Number of Payouts: 24
- Winning Hand: 7♦ 6♥ 4♠ 3♥ 2♠
- References

Final Table
Place	Name	Prize
1st	John Phan (2/2)	$151,896
2nd	Shun Uchida	$95,795
3rd	Gioi Luong	$61,583
4th	Robert Mizrachi (0/1)	$41,055
5th	Ben Ponzio (0/1)	$28,739
6th	David Sklansky (0/3)	$20,528

=== Event 41: $1,500 Mixed Hold'em (Limit/No-Limit) ===
- 3-Day Event: Sunday June 22, 2008 to Tuesday June 24, 2008
- Number of Entries: 731
- Total Prize Pool: $996,450
- Number of Payouts: 72
- Winning Hand: A♠ 3♥
- References

Final Table
Place	Name	Prize
1st	Frank Gary (1/1)	$219,508
2nd	Jonathan Tamayo	$140,093
3rd	Nick Binger	$84,814
4th	Chris Rentes	$69,348
5th	Alex Jalali	$56,875
6th	David Machowsky	$44,902
7th	Mats Gavatin	$34,924
8th	Michael Chu (0/1)	$27,440
9th	David Sorger	$19,956

=== Event 42: $1,000 Seniors No-Limit Hold'em World Championship ===
- 3-Day Event: Monday June 23, 2008 to Wednesday June 25, 2008
- Number of Entries: 2,218
- Total Prize Pool: $2,018,380
- Number of Payouts: 198
- Winning Hand: 9♦ 7♥
- References

Final Table
Place	Name	Prize
1st	Dan Lacourse (1/1)	$368,832
2nd	Dale Eberle	$235,141
3rd	Marc Fluss	$156,424
4th	Jerry Yamachika	$131,194
5th	Fred Berger	$106,974
6th	Charles Wood	$84,771
7th	Peter Silverstein	$64,588
8th	Ed Clark	$49,450
9th	Marty Wilson	$34,312

=== Event 43: $1,500 Pot-Limit Omaha Hi-Low Split-8 or Better ===
- 3-Day Event: Tuesday June 24, 2008 to Thursday June 26, 2008
- Number of Entries: 720
- Total Prize Pool: $982,800
- Number of Payouts: 72
- Winning Hand: A♠ 3♠ Q♣ Q♥
- References

Final Table
Place	Name	Prize
1st	Martin Kläser (1/1)	$216,249
2nd	Casey Kastle	$137,985
3rd	Michael Fetter	$83,538
4th	Erik Seidel (0/8)	$68,304
5th	Jon Maren	$56,019
6th	Chad Burum	$44,226
7th	Joseph Haddad	$34,389
8th	Larry Wright	$27,027
9th	Tom Chambers	$19,656

=== Event 44: $1,000 No-Limit Hold'em w/Rebuys ===
- 3-Day Event: Wednesday June 25, 2008 to Friday June 27, 2008
- Number of Entries: 879
- Number of Rebuys/Add-ons: 2,508
- Total Prize Pool: $3,240,174
- Number of Payouts: 81
- Winning Hand: A♥ J♦
- References

Final Table
Place	Name	Prize
1st	Max Greenwood (1/1)	$693,444
2nd	Rene Mouritsen	$445,523
3rd	Albert Iversen	$267,314
4th	Scott Freeman	$223,572
5th	Jesse Chinni	$183,069
6th	Aliaksandr Dzianisau	$144,187
7th	Curtis Kohlberg	$111,786
8th	Phung Ngo	$87,484
9th	Alex Bolotin	$63,183

=== Event 45: $50,000 World Championship H.O.R.S.E. ===
- 5-Day Event: Wednesday June 25, 2008 to Sunday June 29, 2008
- Number of Entries: 148
- Total Prize Pool: $7,104,000
- Number of Payouts: 16
- Winning Hand: A♦ 10♥ (Hold'em)
- References

Final Table
Place	Name	Prize
1st	Scotty Nguyen (1/5)	$1,989,120
2nd	Michael DeMichele	$1,243,200
3rd	Erick Lindgren (1/1)	$781,440
4th	Matt Glantz	$568,320
5th	Lyle Berman* (0/3)	$444,000
6th	Barry Greenstein (1/3)	$355,200
7th	Huck Seed (0/4)	$284,160
8th	Patrick Bueno	$230,880

=== Event 46: $5,000 No-Limit Hold'em (Six-Handed) ===
- 3-Day Event: Thursday June 26, 2008 to Saturday June 28, 2008
- Number of Entries: 805
- Total Prize Pool: $3,783,500
- Number of Payouts: 78
- Winning Hand: A♦ Q♠
- References

Final Table
Place	Name	Prize
1st	Joe Commisso	$911,855
2nd	Richard Lyndaker	$570,551
3rd	Edward Ochana	$368,891
4th	Sam Trickett	$245,927
5th	Tom Lutz	$174,041
6th	Davidi Kitai (1/1)	$120,693

=== Event 47: $1,500 Seven-Card Stud Hi-Low Split-8 or Better ===
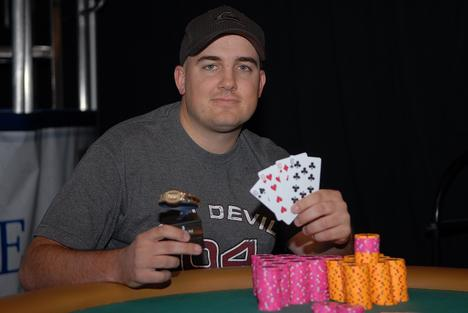
Ryan Hughes after winning his first bracelet in the 2007 World Series of Poker

- 3-Day Event: Thursday June 26, 2008 to Saturday June 28, 2008
- Number of Entries: 544
- Total Prize Pool: $742,560
- Number of Payouts: 56
- Winning Hand: 7♣ 7♥ 3♠ K♥ 4♥ 3♦ 7♠
- References

Final Table
Place	Name	Prize
1st	Ryan Hughes (1/2)	$183,368
2nd	Ron Long	$113,240
3rd	Thomas Hunt III	$68,686
4th	Alessio Isaia	$50,122
5th	Jonas Klausen	$39,355
6th	Tim D'Alessandro	$30,444
7th	Joshua Feldman	$23,019
8th	David Sklansky (0/3)	$19,306

=== Event 48: $2,000 No-Limit Hold'em ===
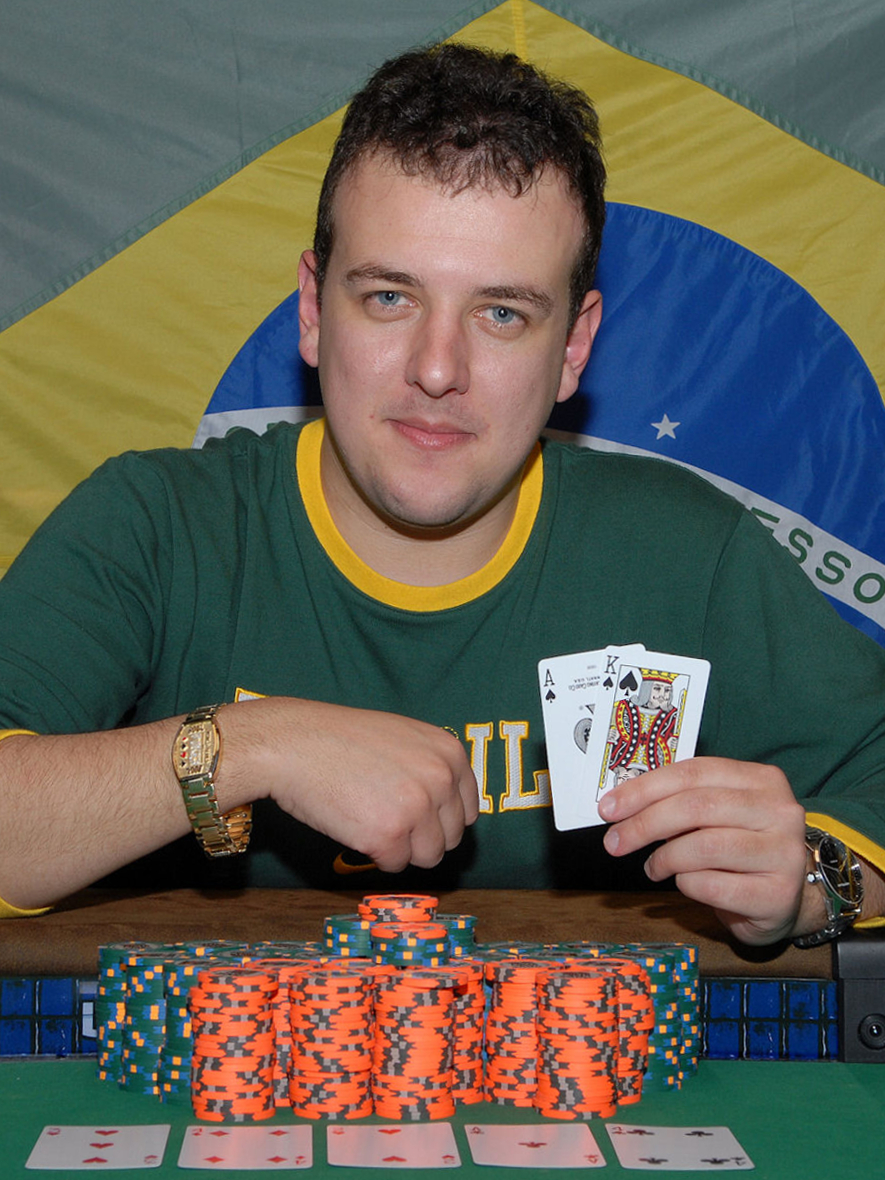
Gomes after winning the $2000 No Limit Hold'em event

- 3-Day Event: Friday June 27, 2008 to Sunday June 29, 2008
- Number of Entries: 2,317
- Total Prize Pool: $4,216,940
- Number of Payouts: 198
- Winning Hand: A♠ K♠
- Other: Nikolay Evdakov sets new record for most WSOP cashes in a single year with nine.
- Other: Alexandre Gomes becomes the first WSOP bracelet winner from South America.
- References

Final Table
Place	Name	Prize
1st	Alexandre Gomes (1/1)	$770,540
2nd	Marco Johnson	$491,273
3rd	Ryan D'Angelo	$326,812
4th	Robert Brewer	$274,101
5th	Alan Cutler	$223,497
6th	Kirill Gerasimov	$177,111
7th	Sverre Sundbo	$134,942
8th	Gabe Costner	$103,315
9th	Dan Rome	$71,687

=== Event 49: $1,500 No-Limit Hold'em ===
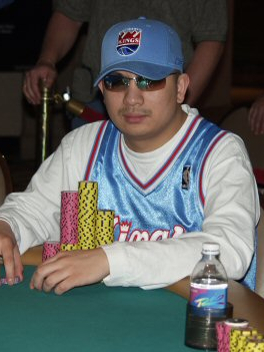
J. C. Tran in a World Series of Poker Circuit event

- 3-Day Event: Saturday June 28, 2008 to Monday June 30, 2008
- Number of Entries: 2,718
- Total Prize Pool: $3,710,070
- Number of Payouts: 270
- Winning Hand: K♣ Q♣
- References

Final Table
Place	Name	Prize
1st	J. C. Tran (1/1)	$631,170
2nd	Rasmus Nielsen	$389,557
3rd	John Conroy	$278,255
4th	Peter Nguyen	$233,734
5th	Joe Pelton	$191,068
6th	Chad Siu	$150,257
7th	Jesper Hoog	$113,157
8th	Robert Kalb	$85,331
9th	Christoph Kohnen	$58,248

=== Event 50: $10,000 World Championship Pot-Limit Omaha ===
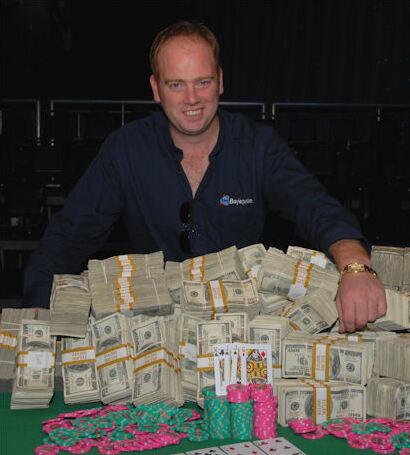
Smyth after winning the 2008 WSOP $10,000 Pot Limit Omaha World Champion

- 3-Day Event: Sunday June 29, 2008 to Tuesday July 1, 2008
- Number of Entries: 381
- Total Prize Pool: $3,581,400
- Number of Payouts: 36
- Winning Hand: K♣ Q♦ J♣ J♠
- Other: Nikolay Evdakov extends his single-year record for WSOP cashes with 10.
- References

Final Table
Place	Name	Prize
1st	Marty Smyth (1/1)	$859,549
2nd	Peter Jetten	$528,256
3rd	Michael Mizrachi	$331,279
4th	Billy Argyros	$268,605
5th	Richard Harroch	$214,884
6th	Kido Pham	$170,116
7th	Tom Hanlon	$134,302
8th	Brandon Moran	$107,442
9th	Greg Hurst	$80,581

=== Event 51: $1,500 H.O.R.S.E. ===
- 3-Day Event: Sunday June 29, 2008 to Tuesday July 1, 2008
- Number of Entries: 803
- Total Prize Pool: $1,096,095
- Number of Payouts: 80
- Winning Hand: 10♣ 8♠ 6♥ 8♣ 9♥ 8♥ A♣ (Stud-8)
- References

Final Table
Place	Name	Prize
1st	James Schaaf (1/1)	$256,412
2nd	Tommy Hang	$158,933
3rd	Phil Hellmuth* (0/11)	$93,168
4th	Esther Rossi	$68,505
5th	Jason Dollinger	$54,804
6th	Sam Silverman	$42,966
7th	Victor Ramdin	$32,992
8th	Matt Grapenthein	$27,511

=== Event 52: $1,500 No-Limit Hold'em ===
- 3-Day Event: Monday June 30, 2008 to Wednesday July 2, 2008
- Number of Entries: 2,693
- Total Prize Pool: $3,675,945
- Number of Payouts: 270
- Winning Hand: 10♥ 10♣
- References

Final Table
Place	Name	Prize
1st	David Daneshgar (1/1)	$625,443
2nd	Scott Sitron	$385,974
3rd	Dan Heimiller (0/1)	$275,695
4th	Freddy Rouhani (1/1)	$231,584
5th	Corwin Cole	$189,311
6th	Matt Matros	$148,875
7th	Andrey Zaichenko	$112,116
8th	Jeff Courtney	$84,546
9th	Voitto Rintala	$57,712

=== Event 53: $1,500 Limit Hold'em Shootout ===
- 2-Day Event: Tuesday July 1, 2008 to Wednesday July 2, 2008
- Number of Entries: 823
- Total Prize Pool: $1,123,395
- Number of Payouts: 90
- Winning Hand: A♦ J♦
- References

Final Table
Place	Name	Prize
1st	Matt Graham (1/1)	$278,180
2nd	Jean-Robert Bellande	$173,564
3rd	Joe Deniro	$107,845
4th	Brandon Wong	$69,088
5th	Danny Wong	$33,701
6th	Spencer Lawrence	$20,221
7th	John Kranyak	$13,480
8th	Andrew Prock	$10,335
9th	Michael Kachan	$7,526

=== Event 54: $10,000 World Championship No-Limit Hold'em ===
- 12-Day Event: Thursday July 3, 2008 to Monday July 14, 2008
- Final Table: Sunday November 9, 2008 to Monday November 10, 2008
- Number of Entries: 6,844
- Total Prize Pool: $64,333,600
- Number of Payouts: 666
- Winning Hand: A♦ 5♠
- References

Final Table
Place	Name	Prize
1st	Peter Eastgate (1/1)	$9,152,416
2nd	Ivan Demidov	$5,809,595
3rd	Dennis Phillips	$4,517,773
4th	Ylon Schwartz	$3,774,974
5th	Scott Montgomery	$3,096,768
6th	Darus Suharto	$2,418,562
7th	David Rheem	$1,772,650
8th	Kelly Kim	$1,288,217
9th	Craig Marquis	$900,670

=== Event 55: $500 Casino Employees No-Limit Hold'em ===
- 2-Day Event: Monday July 7, 2008 to Tuesday July 8, 2008
- Number of Entries: 930
- Total Prize Pool: $418,500
- Number of Payouts: 90
- Winning Hand: unknown
- References

Final Table
Place	Name	Prize
1st	Jonathan Kotula (1/1)	$87,929
2nd	Kevin O'Harra	$56,748
3rd	Glenda Harrell	$34,107
4th	Daniel Kohnen	$28,667
5th	Andrew Brock	$23,435
6th	Michael Anderson	$18,414
7th	Elaine Graham	$14,229
8th	David Dietrich	$11,090
9th	Monica Conrad	$7,951
