= November Nine =

Final table at the Main Event of the World Series of Poker

The November Nine was the name used to refer to the final nine contestants, or final table, at the Main Event of the World Series of Poker (WSOP) from 2008 to 2016. The winner of the WSOP Main Event is considered to be the World Champion of Poker.

Prior to 2008, the entire Main Event was played without interruption. Starting in 2008, in an effort to build excitement in the WSOP and to increase ratings for the tape-delayed televised shows, Harrah's Entertainment and ESPN decided to delay the final table until shortly before its scheduled broadcast. The delay would allow ESPN to cover the rest of the tournament leading up to the final table without viewers knowing the winner in advance. Due to the timing of U.S. presidential elections, the final tables for the 2012 and 2016 Main Events were held in October.

In 2017, Poker Central announced a television and digital media rights agreement with the WSOP and ESPN which returned the final table to the tail end of the rest of the tournament.

== Reception and criticism ==
After the announcement was made to delay the final table, concerns arose as to how the delay would affect the tournament. Ylon Schwartz, a 2008 November Nine participant, criticized the four-month delay by saying, "It ruins the integrity of the tournament. The purity of old-time Las Vegas is gone. The antiquity and purity of the tournament have been liquidated into pure greed and capitalism." ESPN's Senior Director of Programming and Acquisition, Doug White, stated, "The movement of the final table has definitely helped in terms of creating buzz."

When the 2008 November Nine was broadcast "almost live," ESPN received criticism because the network showed the winner's name prior to the broadcast. Poker journalist Dan Skolovy wrote, "It turned out to be a difficult task to avoid hearing the results. Especially since... ESPN scrolled the winner on its sports ticker long before the broadcast aired." Nonetheless, coverage of the 2008 final table garnered more than a 50 percent increase from the previous year in both the number of viewers and households that watched it. The broadcast later received an Emmy Award nomination for "Outstanding Live Event Turnaround."

== Results ==
Name	Name of the player (listed in order of starting chip count from highest to lowest).
Starting chip count	The starting chip count at the start of the final table.
WSOP bracelets	The number of WSOP bracelets at the time the November Nine was determined.^{[a]}
WSOP cashes	The number of WSOP cashes at the time the November Nine was determined.^{[a]}
WSOP earnings	The total of WSOP earnings at the time the November Nine was determined.^{[a]}
Final place	The place in which the player finished the tournament.
Prize	The prize money awarded to that player for their finish at that year's Main Event.

=== 2008 ===
Original field: 6,844

Total prize pool: $64,431,779

Final table minimum prize: $900,670

Final table maximum prize: $9,152,416

Final table total prize pool: $32,633,446

Name	Starting chip count	WSOP bracelets	WSOP cashes	WSOP earnings	Final place	Prize
Dennis Phillips	26,295,000	0	0	$0	3rd	$4,517,773
Ivan Demidov	24,400,000	0	1	$39,854	2nd	$5,809,595
Scott Montgomery	19,690,000	0	3	$73,700	5th	$3,096,768
Peter Eastgate	18,375,000	0	0	$0	1st	$9,152,416
Ylon Schwartz	12,525,000	0	11	$124,580	4th	$3,774,974
Darus Suharto	12,520,000	0	1	$26,389	6th	$2,418,562
David Rheem	10,230,000	0	5	$474,863	7th	$1,772,650
Craig Marquis	10,210,000	0	3	$35,759	9th	$900,670
Kelly Kim	2,620,000	0	3	$45,191	8th	$1,288,217

Dennis Phillips was an account manager for a commercial trucking company. Peter Eastgate, from Denmark, was one of only two non-North American players to make it to the final table (Russian Ivan Demidov was the other). By making the final table, Eastgate and 23-year-old Craig Marquis threatened Phil Hellmuth's 19-year record as youngest person to ever win the WSOP Main Event; Eastgate's victory gave him that distinction. Ylon Schwartz was a former professional chess hustler in New York City parks. Two players, accountant Darus Suharto and poker professional Scott Montgomery, were originally from Canada. Kelly Kim, who had the fewest chips entering the final table, was an established professional player who cashed in numerous events but never won a major tournament.

=== 2009 ===
Original field: 6,494

Total prize pool: $61,043,600

Final table minimum prize: $1,263,602

Final table maximum prize: $8,547,042

Final table total prize pool: $27,220,989

Name	Starting chip count	WSOP bracelets	WSOP cashes	WSOP earnings	Final place	Prize
Darvin Moon	58,930,000	0	0	$0	2nd	$5,182,928
Eric Buchman	34,800,000	0	9	$320,893	4th	$2,502,890
Steven Begleiter	29,885,000	0	0	$0	6th	$1,587,160
Jeff Shulman	19,580,000	0	15	$289,551	5th	$1,953,452
Joe Cada	13,215,000	0	2	$28,214	1st	$8,547,042
Kevin Schaffel	12,390,000	0	2	$92,166	8th	$1,300,231
Phil Ivey	9,765,000	7	38	$3,843,018	7th	$1,404,014
Antoine Saout	9,500,000	0	0	$0	3rd	$3,479,670
James Akenhead	6,800,000	0	2	$525,867	9th	$1,263,602

The final table's "rags to riches" story was Darvin Moon, a logger from Maryland. Moon entered the Main Event after winning a $130 satellite tournament in Wheeling, West Virginia.

Jeff Shulman, who entered the final table in fourth place, was the president for Card Player Magazine. Shulman openly stated that, if he won the bracelet, he would throw it away. Some initially speculated that this announcement stemmed from the fact that Harrah's Casino had partnered with Card Player Magazine's main competitor, Bluff Magazine. However, an article on the Card Player website indicated that Shulman's supposed disdain for Harrah's Casino was not based on its partnership with Bluff Magazine. “My comments have nothing to do with that, and everything to do with my disappointment in how the World Series is run," said Shulman. "It used to be run by people who loved and really cared about poker, and had the players in mind, first and foremost. That mission's been derailed by a few executives who now head the Series." He also indicated that, if he won the bracelet, he would not throw it in the trash, but instead would pursue one of four options: hold an auction and donate the money to charity, hold a tournament for the players shut out of the 2009 WSOP Main Event, give it away as part of a promotion on SpadeClub.com (an online poker site sponsored by Cardplayer), or give it to television personality Stephen Colbert.

Other notable finalists included seven-time bracelet winner Phil Ivey and former Bear Stearns senior executive Steven Begleiter.

At age 21, Joe Cada became the youngest player ever to win the WSOP Main Event.

=== 2010 ===
Original field: 7,319

Total prize pool: $68,798,600

Final table minimum prize: $811,823

Final table maximum prize: $8,944,310

Final table prize pool: $29,032,637

Name	Starting chip count	WSOP bracelets	WSOP cashes	WSOP earnings	Final place	Prize
Jonathan Duhamel	65,975,000	0	2	$43,000	1st	$8,944,310
John Dolan	46,250,000	0	5	$105,340	6th	$1,772,959
Joseph Cheong	23,525,000	0	2	$31,064	3rd	$4,130,049
John Racener	19,050,000	0	10	$157,528	2nd	$5,545,955
Matthew Jarvis	16,700,000	0	0	0	8th	$1,045,743
Filippo Candio	16,400,000	0	1	$3,460	4th	$3,092,545
Michael Mizrachi	14,450,000	1	23	$2,271,327	5th	$2,332,992
Cuong Soi Nguyen	9,650,000	0	0	0	9th	$811,823
Jason Senti	7,625,000	0	1	$17,987	7th	$1,356,720

Jonathan Duhamel wins the tournament with the lead in chips at the final table.

=== 2011 ===
Original field: 6,865

Total prize Pool: $64,531,000

Final table minimum prize: $782,115

Final table maximum prize: $8,715,638

Final table prize pool: $28,469,161

Name	Starting chip count	WSOP bracelets	WSOP cashes	WSOP earnings	Final place	Prize
Martin Staszko	40,175,000	0	4	$22,875	2nd	$5,433,086
Eoghan O'Dea	33,925,000	0	5	$37,516	6th	$1,720,831
Matt Giannetti	24,750,000	0	10	$237,249	4th	$3,012,700
Phil Collins	23,875,000	0	8	$48,769	5th	$2,269,599
Ben Lamb	20,875,000	1	12	$2,157,249	3rd	$4,021,138
Badih "Bob" Bounahra	19,700,000	0	1	$7,582	7th	$1,314,097
Pius Heinz	16,425,000	0	1	$83,286	1st	$8,715,638
Anton Makiievskyi	13,825,000	0	0	0	8th	$1,010,015
Sam Holden	12,375,000	0	0	0	9th	$782,115

Eoghan O'Dea's father, Donnacha O'Dea, played the Main Event final table in 1983, making them the first father-son duo to make the final table. Martin Staszko, Badih Bounahra and Anton Makiievskyi were the first players to make the final table from their respective countries: Czech Republic, Belize and Ukraine. With seven different countries represented, this was the most internationally diverse Main Event final table in WSOP history.

=== 2012 ===
Original field: 6,598

Total prize Pool: $62,021,200

Final table minimum prize: $754,798

Final table maximum prize: $8,527,982

Final table prize pool: $27,247,840

Name	Starting chip count	WSOP bracelets	WSOP cashes	WSOP earnings	Final place	Prize
Jesse Sylvia	43,875,000	0	2	$36,372	2nd	$5,295,149
Andras Koroknai	29,375,000	0	2	$39,371	6th	$1,640,461
Greg Merson	28,725,000	1	5	$1,253,501	1st	$8,531,853
Russell Thomas	24,800,000	0	3	$126,796	4th	$2,850,494
Steven Gee	16,860,000	1	4	$480,822	9th	$754,798
Michael Esposito	16,260,000	0	3	$27,311	7th	$1,257,790
Robert Salaburu	15,155,000	0	0	0	8th	$971,252
Jacob Balsiger	13,115,000	0	1	$3,531	3rd	$3,797,558
Jeremy Ausmus	9,805,000	0	13	$114,623	5th	$2,154,616

=== 2013 ===
Original field: 6,352

Total prize Pool: $59,708,800

Final table minimum prize: $733,224

Final table maximum prize: $8,359,531

Final table prize pool: $26,662,066

Name	Starting chip count	WSOP bracelets	WSOP cashes	WSOP earnings	Final place	Prize
J.C. Tran	38,000,000	2	40	$1,843,946	5th	$2,106,893
Amir Lehavot	29,700,000	1	12	$818,414	3rd	$3,727,823
Marc-Etienne McLaughlin	26,525,000	0	6	$639,168	6th	$1,601,024
Jay Farber	25,975,000	0	0	0	2nd	$5,174,357
Ryan Riess	25,875,000	0	3	$30,569	1st	$8,361,570
Sylvain Loosli	19,600,000	0	0	0	4th	$2,792,533
Michiel Brummelhuis	11,275,000	0	7	$174,170	7th	$1,225,224
Mark Newhouse	7,350,000	0	6	$152,725	9th	$733,224
David Benefield	6,375,000	0	12	$455,713	8th	$944,593

=== 2014 ===
Original field: 6,683

Total prize Pool: $62,820,200

Final table minimum prize: $730,725

Final table maximum prize: $10,000,000

Final table prize pool: $28,480,121

Name	Starting chip count	WSOP bracelets	WSOP cashes	WSOP earnings	Final place	Prize
Jorryt van Hoof	38,375,000	0	3	$27,956	3rd	$3,807,753
Felix Stephensen	32,775,000	0	0	0	2nd	$5,147,911
Mark Newhouse	26,000,000	0	8	$906,093	9th	$730,725
Andoni Larrabe	22,550,000	0	3	$20,068	6th	$1,622,471
Dan Sindelar	21,200,000	0	17	$149,991	7th	$1,236,084
William Pappaconstantinou	17,500,000	0	0	0	5th	$2,143,794
William Tonking	15,050,000	0	3	$14,701	4th	$2,849,763
Martin Jacobson	14,900,000	0	13	$1,204,983	1st	$10,000,000
Bruno Politano	12,125,000	0	3	$25,404	8th	$947,172

Mark Newhouse became the first player to make two consecutive Main Event final tables since Dan Harrington in 2003 and 2004. Bruno Politano became the first Main Event finalist from Brazil. This is the second final table since the format change in 2008 that none of the players had previously won a bracelet.

=== 2015 ===
Original field: 6,420

Total prize Pool: $60,348,000

Final table minimum prize: $1,001,020

Final table maximum prize: $7,683,346

Final table prize pool: $24,799,118

Name	Starting chip count	WSOP bracelets	WSOP cashes	WSOP earnings	Final place	Prize
Joe McKeehen	63,100,000	0	8	$883,494	1st	$7,683,346
Ofer Stern	29,800,000	0	5	$58,384	5th	$1,911,423
Neil Blumenfield	22,000,000	0	3	$44,395	3rd	$3,398,298
Pierre Neuville	21,075,000	0	19	$591,460	7th	$1,203,293
Max Steinberg	20,200,000	1	11	$1,406,138	4th	$2,615,361
Thomas Cannuli	12,250,000	0	2	$20,203	6th	$1,426,283
Joshua Beckley	11,800,000	0	4	$19,403	2nd	$4,470,896
Patrick Chan	6,225,000	0	4	$113,145	9th	$1,001,020
Federico Butteroni	6,200,000	0	2	$49,255	8th	$1,097,056

Joe McKeehen is the second player to start with the chip lead at the final table and win.

=== 2016 ===
Original field: 6,737

Total prize Pool: $63,327,800

Final table minimum prize: $1,000,000

Final table maximum prize: $8,000,000

Final table prize pool: $25,432,920

Name	Starting chip count	WSOP bracelets	WSOP cashes	WSOP earnings	Final place	Prize
Cliff Josephy	74,600,000	2	17	$810,358	3rd	$3,453,035
Qui Nguyen	67,925,000	0	1	$9,029	1st	$8,005,310
Gordon Vayo	49,375,000	0	26	$608,136	2nd	$4,661,228
Kenny Hallaert	43,325,000	0	22	$367,855	6th	$1,464,258
Michael Ruane	31,600,000	0	3rd	$24,438	4th	$2,576,003
Vojtech Ruzicka	27,300,000	0	17	$138,585	5th	$1,935,288
Griffin Benger	26,175,000	0	13	$231,201	7th	$1,250,190
Jerry Wong	10,175,000	0	19	$118,156	8th	$1,100,076
Fernando Pons	6,150,000	0	0	0	9th	$1,000,000

== Notes ==
^{a} The number of bracelets, cashes, and earnings of the players is determined at the time they qualified for the final table of the Main Event. It does not represent any results from subsequent WSOP events including the World Series of Poker Europe, which occurs between the time the final table is determined and subsequently seated.
