= Joe Cada =

American poker player (born 1987)

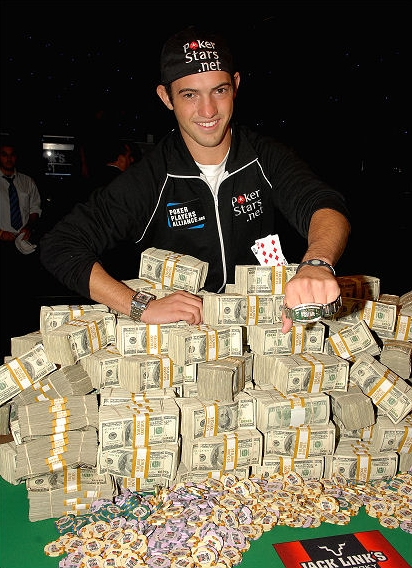
- Cada after winning the 2009 World Series of Poker Main Event
- Nicknames: jcada99 (online alias), The Kid
- Born: November 18, 1987 (age 38); Michigan

World Series of Poker
- Bracelets: 4
- Final tables: 12
- Money finishes: 66
- Highest WSOP Main Event finish: Winner, 2009

European Poker Tour
- Money finish: 1

Joseph Cada (born November 18, 1987) is an American professional poker player from Shelby Charter Township, Michigan, best known as the winner of the Main Event at the 2009 World Series of Poker (WSOP). By winning the 6,494-entrant Main Event at the age of 21 years, 11 months and 23 days, Cada surpassed the mark set the previous year by Peter Eastgate as the youngest champion ever. Cada had two previous WSOP in the money finishes, both in 2009. Cada had been a regular online poker player for several years prior to winning the live WSOP event. He is primarily an online poker player. As of 2026, his total live tournament winnings exceed $15,000,000. Cada became a representative of Team PokerStars in 2009 in the weeks prior to becoming World Champion. On June 18, 2012, he lost heads up in the 2,811-entrant $1,500 No Limit Texas hold 'em event at the 2012 World Series of Poker. Cada is from a family of card enthusiasts, although his parents disapproved of his chosen profession. His agent dubbed him "The Kid" (although this is already Stu Ungar's nickname), and he has also taken on the role as a statesman of the profession in the media and political circles, where he is a proponent of legalization of gambling.

== Poker career ==
=== Summary ===
Cada started playing online poker at about the age of 15. His first online account was with PartyPoker. He started with $50 playing 5c /10c and quickly moved up stakes finding success. After 2 years Cada was playing the highest stakes on Party Poker. When he was 18 years old he started playing on Ultimate Bet where he eventually became a regular at $5/10, $10/25, and $25/50 NLHE. Cada was heavily impacted in the UB scandal where he was cheated out of $150,000 which caused him to move back down to $5/10 and $10/25. Although he was not legally able to play in casinos prior to age 21 in the United States, he could play in Canada at age 19 and play online. At the time of his WSOP success, he was playing approximately 2,000 hands per day online at PokerStars under the User ID jcada99. Cada had been a professional poker player for six years at the time of his world championship. Between the end of 2008 and the 2009 November Nine, Cada had earned $551,788 profit in online tournaments while still having success in the online cash games. Cada enjoys playing the "Sunday Major" tournaments at various online sites and says he honed his skill pursuing the knowledge and experience of better players at online training sites. He typically hosts many poker playing friends on Sundays to keep each other company while going through the grueling Sundays of playing the various majors. Usually, on Sundays, Cada hosts about fifteen friends to play online at his house. According to his CardPlayer magazine profile, Cada used several similar aliases to play with various online poker hosts: jcada99 and Joe Cada on the Full Tilt Poker website, jcada99 on PokerStars, and JCADA99 on Absolute Poker.

== World Series of Poker ==
World Series of Poker results
Year	Cashes	Final Tables	Bracelets
2009	3	1	1
2011	2		
2012	3	1	
2013	3	2	
2014	1	1	1
2015	3		
2016	6		
2017	7		
2018	7	4	2
2019	8	1	
2022	8	1	
2023	5	1	
2024	4		

World Series of Poker bracelets
Year	Tournament	Prize (US$)
2009	$10,000 No Limit Hold'em Main Event	$8,547,044
2014	$10,000 No Limit Texas Hold 'em six handed	$670,041
2018	$3,000 No Limit Hold'em Shootout	$226,218
2018	$1,500 The Closer No Limit Hold'em	$612,886

=== 2009 World Series of Poker ===
At the 2009 World Series of Poker, he had three in the money finishes (all in No limit Texas hold 'em): 64th in the 1,088-entrant June 5–7 Event 13, $2,500 No Limit Hold'em, which earned him $6,681; 17th in the 2,095-entrant June 16–18 Event 35, $1,500 No Limit Hold'em, which earned him $21,533; and 1st in the 6,494-entrant July 3–15, November 7 and 9 Event 57 $10,000 World Championship No Limit Hold'em, which earned him $8,546,435. Prior to his final table victory, Cada earned a $1 million contract with PokerStars that pays for all his hotels, travels, and some of his buy-ins. His signing with PokerStars resulted from an interview on ESPN with Phil Gordon where he expressed an interest in signing with that specific company. His agent had already procured him offers from UltimateBet and PokerHost as a result of his November Nine qualification. Cada was represented by agent Dan Frank. In the main event, Cada was the tournament chip leader after day 1C, which was the third of the four opening day sessions, but he began the final table with the fifth largest chipstack. In the 122nd final table hand Cada's stack was reduced to 2,275,000—enough for only four big blinds and about 1.2% of the combined total stack at play—due to calling Jeff Shulman's "all in" pre-flop with A♦ J♣ against A♣ K♥. No community cards hit either player, and Shulman was rewarded by his better high card. Cada later went all in twice pre-flop with small pocket pairs and was dominated by higher pocket pairs on both occasions, once with 3♥ 3♣ vs. J♦ J♣ and the other with 2♠ 2♣ vs Q♠ Q♥. Both times Cada flopped the winning three of a kind. By the time the field was reduced to two players he had 135 million chips to 58 million for Darvin Moon. During the final heads-up duel, Cada surrendered the chip lead, but he eventually climbed back to 120.1 million before the last hand of the heads-up with Moon. He regained the chip lead on the 80th hand. His winning hand was 9♣ 9♦, which he got all-in pre-flop against Moon's Q♦ J♦, which was a classic race situation prior to the flop. The board ran 8♣ 2♣ 7♠ K♥ 7♣. This hand was the 88th hand of heads-up play between Cada and Moon. These three events account for his total cumulative career live event earnings of over $8.5 million. With the November 2009 victory, which occurred just over a week before his 22nd birthday, Cada supplanted Peter Eastgate, who won at age 22, as the youngest World Series of Poker Main Event champion. He was 340 days younger than Eastgate had been at the time of becoming world champion. In the week following the WSOP win, Cada made numerous publicity appearances as a poker ambassador. His media events included appearances on CNN, CBS News, CNBC, Late Show with David Letterman, numerous ESPN outlets including First Take, The Scott Van Pelt Show, ESPNU, ESPNews, ESPN Inside Deal, and ESPN.com as well as a taping for SportsCenter that was never aired plus a visit to WWE Raw. During the publicity run, Dennis Phillips served as Cada's advisor.

=== 2010–2017 ===
Cada finished second in the 2,811-entrant June 16–18, 2012 $1,500 No-Limit Hold'em Event #31, which earned him $412,424. He won a bracelet in the 264-entrant June 14–16, 2014 $10,000 No-Limit Hold'em 6-Handed Championship Event #32, which earned him $670,041.

=== 2018 World Series of Poker ===
At the 2018 World Series of Poker, Cada earned two more bracelets and a fifth-place finish in the $10,000 No Limit Hold'em Main Event, which earned him more than any of his non-main event bracelet victories. He won the 363-entrant May 31 – June 2, 2018 $3,000 No-Limit Hold'em Shootout Event #3, which earned him $226,218. When Cada made the 7,874-entrant July 2–14 $10,000 No Limit Hold'em Main Event final table for the second time (earning $2,150,000), he became the first former champion to do so since 1995 winner Dan Harrington reached the 2003 main event final table (although 2001 champion Carlos Mortensen made the unofficial final table in 2013, finishing 10th). After being eliminated from the main event, Cada entered the 3,120-entrant July 12–15, 2018 The Closer – $1,500 No-Limit Hold'em (30 minute levels) – $1 Million Guarantee Event #75, which he won for $612,886 for his 4th career bracelet, and his 2nd of 2018. These finishes gave him a third-place finish in that year's WSOP Player of the Year, behind Shaun Deeb and Ben Yu.

== Personal life ==
Ann Cada, Joe's mother, was a blackjack card dealer at the MotorCity Casino. Cada has an older brother, Jerome, two older sisters Theresa and Jillian, and one half little sister Alex. Cada's father, Jerry, was affected by the late-2000s recession when his automobile industry job was eliminated in a layoff. During the 2009 World Series of Poker's November Nine, dozens of Cada's fans wore T-shirts with Michigan Wolverines team colors (maize and blue) with the words, "PokerStars Michigan Joe Cada 'The Kid'" emblazoned across the front and Michigan baseball caps with "The Kid" on the back. His agent came up with the nickname "The Kid". In an interview in Time, Cada estimates he had about 100 friends in his cheering section. In the Time interview, Cada expressed his thoughts on legislation related to the legality of gambling: "I support the right to play poker online. Poker isn't gambling. It's a hobby, an activity, a game. It's not about luck—it's about logic, decision-making, math. We all should be able to play poker on the Web if we want to, and I believe that making it illegal strips us of our rights. This is an important issue, and hopefully we'll see it resolved soon." Outside of poker, Cada also plays indoor soccer. As of 2009, he was considering purchasing a second home in Las Vegas, Nevada and possibly opening a bar.
