= 2008 World Series of Poker =

Series of poker tournaments

- Location: Rio All-Suite Hotel and Casino, Las Vegas, Nevada
- Dates: May 30 – July 15

Champion
- (Denmark) Peter Eastgate

The 2008 World Series of Poker was the 39th annual World Series of Poker (WSOP). Held in Las Vegas, Nevada, at the Rio All Suite Hotel and Casino, the series began on May 30, 2008, and featured 55 poker championships in several variants. All events but the $10,000 World Championship No Limit Texas hold 'em Main Event, the most prestigious of the WSOP events, ended by July 15. As has been the WSOP custom since 1976, each of the event winners received a championship bracelet in addition to that event's prize money, which (after the casino's rake) ranged from $87,929 to $9,119,517.

Highlights of the 2008 series include the selection of Erick Lindgren, who won a bracelet and made three final tables, as recipient of the "Player of the Year Award". Nikolay Evdakov led all players with a record 10 money finishes, and Phil Hellmuth set a WSOP record of 41 career final tables. The Main Event, which began with 6,844 participants (a level exceeded only by the number of participants at the 2006 event), was suspended once the event was down to the 9 players needed for the final table; the Main Event was resumed on November 9, and concluded with the heads-up final between Peter Eastgate and Ivan Demidov the next day. This year was the first in which the Main Event was suspended in this fashion, a change introduced at ESPN's request to allow the TV network to do a same-day Main Event broadcast.

In a stunning statistical improbability, Justin Phillips knocked out Motoyuki Mabuchi in the Main Event. Phillips held a Royal Flush, while Mabuchi held quad aces. One of the broadcasters, Lon McEachern, mentioned on air that the chances of such a showdown occurring were 1:2.7 billion. Ray Romano had just sat down at the table when this hand played itself out.

== Event schedule ==
#	Event	Entrants	Winner	Prize	Runner-up	Results
1	$10,000 World Championship Pot Limit Hold'em	352	Nenad Medic (1/1)	$794,112	Andy Bloch	Results
2	$1,500 No Limit Hold'em	3,929	Grant Hinkle (1/1)	$831,462	James Akenhead	Results
3	$1,500 Pot Limit Hold'em	713	David Singer (1/1)	$214,131	Jacobo Fernandez	Results
4	$5,000 Mixed Hold'em	332	Erick Lindgren (1/1)	$374,505	Justin Bonomo	Results
5	$1,000 No Limit Hold'em w/rebuys	766	Michael Banducci (1/1)	$636,736	Jeff Williams	Results
6	$1,500 Omaha Hi-Low Split-8 or Better	833	Thang Luu (1/1)	$243,356	Spencer Lawrence	Results
7	$2,000 No Limit Hold'em	1,592	Matt Keikoan (1/1)	$550,601	Shannon Shorr	Results
8	$10,000 World Championship Mixed Event	192	Anthony Rivera (1/1)	$483,688	James Mackey (0/1)	Results
9	$1,500 No Limit Hold'em Six Handed	1,236	Rep Porter (1/1)	$372,929	Nathan Templeton	Results
10	$2,500 Omaha/Seven Card Stud Hi-Low-8 or Better	388	Freddy Rouhani (1/1)	$232,911	Tom Chambers	Results
11	$5,000 No Limit Hold'em Shootout	360	Phil Tom (1/1)	$477,990	Greg Mueller	Results
12	$1,500 Limit Hold'em	880	Jimmy Shultz (1/1)	$257,105	Zac Fellows	Results
13	$2,500 No Limit Hold'em	1,397	Duncan Bell (1/1)	$666,777	Steve Merrifield	Results
14	$10,000 World Championship Seven Card Stud	158	Eric Brooks (1/1)	$415,856	Fu Wong	Results
15	$1,000 Ladies No Limit Hold'em World Championship	1,190	Svetlana Gromenkova (1/1)	$244,702	Anh Le	Results
16	$2,000 Omaha Hi-Low Split-8 or Better	553	Andrew Brown (1/1)	$226,483	Ted Forrest (0/5)	Results
17	$1,500 No Limit Hold'em Shootout	1,000	Jason Young (1/1)	$335,565	Mike Schwartz	Results
18	$5,000 No Limit 2-7 Draw Lowball w/rebuys	85	Mike Matusow (1/3)	$537,862	Jeff Lisandro (0/1)	Results
19	$1,500 Pot Limit Omaha	759	Vanessa Selbst (1/1)	$227,965	Jamie Pickering	Results
20	$2,000 Limit Hold'em	480	Daniel Negreanu (1/4)	$204,874	Ugur Marangoz	Results
21	$5,000 No Limit Hold'em	731	Scott Seiver (1/1)	$755,891	Dave Seidman	Results
22	$3,000 H.O.R.S.E.	414	Jens Vortmann (1/1)	$298,253	Doug Ganger	Results
23	$2,000 No Limit Hold'em	1,344	Blair Hinkle (1/1)	$507,563	Mark Brockington	Results
24	$2,500 Pot Limit Hold'em/Omaha	457	Max Pescatori (1/2)	$246,471	Kyle Kloeckner	Results
25	$10,000 World Championship Heads Up No Limit Hold'em	256	Kenny Tran (1/1)	$539,056	Alec Torelli	Results
26	$1,500 Razz	453	Barry Greenstein (1/3)	$157,619	Chris Klodnicki	Results
27	$1,500 No Limit Hold'em	2,706	Vitaly Lunkin (1/1)	$628,417	Brett Kimes	Results
28	$5,000 Pot Limit Omaha w/rebuys	152	Phil Galfond (1/1)	$817,781	Adam Hourani	Results
29	$3,000 No Limit Hold'em	716	John Phan (1/1)	$434,789	Johnny Neckar	Results
30	$10,000 World Championship Limit Hold'em	218	Rob Hollink (1/1)	$496,931	Jerrod Ankenman	Results
31	$2,500 No Limit Hold'em Six Handed	1,012	Dario Minieri (1/1)	$528,418	Seth Fischer	Results
32	$1,500 No Limit Hold'em	2,304	Luis Velador (1/1)	$574,734	Chris Signore	Results
33	$5,000 World Championship Seven Card Stud Hi-Low Split-8 or Better	261	Sebastian Ruthenberg (1/1)	$328,756	Chris Ferguson (0/5)	Results
34	$1,500 Pot Limit Omaha w/rebuys	320	Layne Flack (1/6)	$577,725	Daniel Makowsky	Results
35	$1,500 Seven Card Stud	381	Michael Rocco (1/1)	$135,753	Al Barbieri	Results
36	$1,500 No Limit Hold'em	2,447	Jesper Hougaard (1/1)	$610,304	Cody Slaubaugh	Results
37	$10,000 World Championship Omaha Hi-Low Split-8 or Better	235	David Benyamine (1/1)	$535,687	Greg Jamison	Results
38	$2,000 Pot Limit Hold'em	605	Davidi Kitai (1/1)	$244,583	Chris Bell	Results
39	$1,500 No Limit Hold'em	2,720	David Woo (1/1)	$631,656	Matt Wood	Results
40	$2,500 2-7 Limit Triple Draw Lowball	238	John Phan (2/2)	$151,896	Shun Uchida	Results
41	$1,500 Mixed Hold'em	731	Frank Gary (1/1)	$219,508	Jonathan Tamayo	Results
42	$1,000 Seniors No Limit Hold'em World Championship	2,218	Dan Lacourse (1/1)	$368,832	Dale Eberle	Results
43	$1,500 Pot Limit Omaha Hi-Low Split-8 or Better	720	Martin Klaser (1/1)	$216,249	Casey Kastle	Results
44	$1,000 No Limit Hold'em w/rebuys	879	Max Greenwood (1/1)	$693,444	Rene Mouritsen	Results
45	$50,000 World Championship H.O.R.S.E.	148	Scotty Nguyen (1/5)	$1,989,120	Michael DeMichele	Results
46	$5,000 No Limit Hold'em Six Handed	805	Joe Commisso (1/1)	$911,855	Richard Lyndaker	Results
47	$1,500 Seven Card Stud Hi-Low Split-8 or Better	544	Ryan Hughes (1/2)	$183,368	Ron Long	Results
48	$2,000 No Limit Hold'em	2,317	Alexandre Gomes (1/1)	$770,540	Marco Johnson	Results
49	$1,500 No Limit Hold'em	2,718	J.C. Tran (1/1)	$631,170	Rasmus Nielsen	Results
50	$10,000 World Championship Pot Limit Omaha	381	Marty Smyth (1/1)	$859,549	Peter Jetten	Results
51	$1,500 H.O.R.S.E.	803	James Schaaf (1/1)	$256,412	Tommy Hang	Results
52	$1,500 No Limit Hold'em	2,693	David Daneshgar (1/1)	$625,443	Scott Sitron	Results
53	$1,500 Limit Hold'em Shootout	823	Matt Graham (1/1)	$278,180	Jean-Robert Bellande	Results
54	$10,000 World Championship No Limit Hold'em Main Event	6,844	Peter Eastgate (1/1)	$9,119,517	Ivan Demidov	Results
55	$500 Casino Employees No Limit Hold'em	930	Jonathan Kotula (1/1)	$87,929	Kevin O'Harra	Results

== 2008 records ==
Nikolay Evdakov set a WSOP record for most cashes at a single World Series with 10. The previous record of 8 was held by 5 players: Chris Ferguson, Phil Hellmuth, Humberto Brenes, Michael Binger, and Chad Brown. Evdakov's achievement also represents the most cashes by a player at one WSOP without reaching a single final table. Hellmuth, who made two final tables, established a new WSOP career record of 41 final tables, two more than T. J. Cloutier. Scotty Nguyen became the first player to hold both a Main Event and a $50,000 H.O.R.S.E World Championship bracelet.

Several nationals were the first from their country to win bracelets. Brazilian Alexandre Gomes won Event 48 to become the first South American player to win a WSOP bracelet since Ecuadorian-born Carlos Mortensen won the 2001 Main Event. Rob Hollink won Event 30, becoming the first Dutch WSOP bracelet winner, and Davidi Kitai won Event 38, becoming the first Belgian player to win a bracelet.

The 2008 Main Event final table took 15 hours and 28 minutes to play, beating the previous record of 14 hours and 2 minutes in 2005.

== Main Event ==
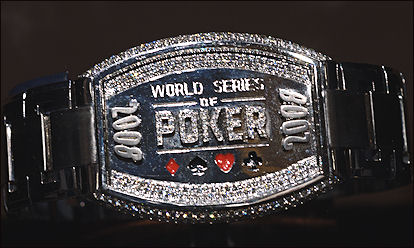
The 2008 World Series of Poker Championship Bracelet

The $10,000 World Championship No Limit Texas Hold 'em Main Event began on July 3 with the first of four starting days. After reaching the final table of nine players on July 14, the final table was delayed until November 9. This change in schedule was made to allow ESPN to broadcast the final table on November 11, shortly after it was played. All final table players were paid ninth place prize money ($900,670) in July, with the remaining prize pool distributed in November. Instead of the Amazon Room, aka "the Poker Room," where all of the events were held, the final table would be held in the Penn and Teller Theatre. On November 9, players played down from nine to two and the winner was decided the next night. The final table consisted of 274 hands in total.

After a large decrease in Main Event participants in 2007 (6358) compared to 2006 (8773), the number increased slightly in 2008 (6844) but was still far from the 2006 number. As in 2007, the payout structure is flatter than in 2006 and before, with the lowest payouts at $21,230 (more than double the buy-in), as compared to $10,616 in 2006.

The "last woman standing" in the 2008 Main Event was Tiffany Michelle, who finished in 17th place. Celebrities best known from television, music, and professional sports, among other areas, also participated, with two placing in the money. The list includes:

- Out in Day 1: Jason Alexander, Nick Cannon, José Canseco, Jeff Fenech, Larry Flynt, Forrest Griffin, Orel Hershiser, Chuck Liddell, Brad May, Mekhi Phifer, Sam Simon, Jennifer Tilly, David Wells.
- Out in Day 2: Paul Azinger, Bruce Buffer, Shannon Elizabeth, Sully Erna, Ray Romano.
- Out in Day 3: Andy Griggs, Shane Warne.
- Out in Day 4: Steve Davis (389th place, $28,950).
- Out in Day 5: Kara Scott (104th place, $41,816).

=== November Nine ===
Name	Number of chips (percentage of total)	WSOP Bracelets	WSOP Cashes*	WSOP Earnings*
(United States) Dennis Phillips	26,295,000 (19.2%)	0	0	0
(Russia) Ivan Demidov	24,400,000 (17.8%)	0	1	$39,854
(Canada) Scott Montgomery	19,690,000 (14.4%)	0	3	$73,700
(Denmark) Peter Eastgate	18,375,000 (13.4%)	0	0	0
(United States) Ylon Schwartz	12,525,000 (9.2%)	0	11	$124,580
(Canada) Darus Suharto	12,520,000 (9.1%)	0	1	$26,389
(United States) David Rheem	10,230,000 (7.5%)	0	5	$474,843
(United States) Craig Marquis	10,210,000 (7.5%)	0	3	$35,759
(United States) Kelly Kim	2,620,000 (1.9%)	0	3	$38,750

*Career statistics prior to the beginning of the 2008 Main Event

=== Final table ===
Place	Name	Prize
1st	Peter Eastgate	$9,152,416
2nd	Ivan Demidov	$5,790,024
3rd	Dennis Phillips	$4,503,352
4th	Ylon Schwartz	$3,763,515
5th	Scott Montgomery	$3,088,012
6th	Darus Suharto	$2,412,510
7th	David Rheem	$1,769,174
8th	Kelly Kim	$1,286,672
9th	Craig Marquis	$900,670

At the age of 22, Peter Eastgate became the youngest Main Event winner, surpassing Phil Hellmuth who was 24 when he won in 1989 and became the first European to capture the title since Carlos Mortensen won in 2001. His winning hand was a 5 high straight known as a "wheel", made from his hole cards A♦ 5♠ and 3 of the community cards which were 2♦ K♠ 3♥ 4♣ 7♠, while his opponent Ivan Demidov lost with 4♥ 2♥ for two pair.

=== Other notable high finishes ===
NB: This list is restricted to top 100 finishers with an existing Wikipedia entry.

Place	Name	Prize
15th	Owen Crowe	$436,201
17th	Tiffany Michelle	$334,534
20th	Brandon Cantu	$257,334
26th	Phi Nguyen	$257,334
30th	Mike Matusow	$193,000
45th	Phil Hellmuth	$154,400
71st	James McManus	$96,500
73rd	David Benefield	$77,200
80th	Mark Vos	$77,200

=== Performance of past champions ===
Name	Championship Year(s)	Day of Elimination
Doyle Brunson	1976, 1977	1D
Bobby Baldwin	1978	1A
Tom McEvoy	1983	1B
Berry Johnston	1986	1A
Johnny Chan	1987, 1988	4 (329th)
Phil Hellmuth	1989	6 (45th)
Brad Daugherty	1991	2B
Jim Bechtel	1993	1C
Dan Harrington	1995	1A
Huck Seed	1996	1C
Scotty Nguyen	1998	2A
Noel Furlong	1999	1D
Chris Ferguson	2000	1D
Carlos Mortensen	2001	2B
Robert Varkonyi	2002	2A
Chris Moneymaker	2003	3
Greg Raymer	2004	1B
Joe Hachem	2005	2B
Jamie Gold	2006	1B
Jerry Yang	2007	2B
