= Owen Crowe =

Canadian poker player (born 1982)

- Nicknames: ocrowe (Full Tilt, PokerStars Ultimate Bet)
- Born: 1982 (age 43–44); Halifax, Nova Scotia

World Series of Poker
- Final tables: 4
- Money finishes: 27
- Highest WSOP Main Event finish: 15, 2008

World Poker Tour
- Final table: 1
- Money finishes: 3

European Poker Tour
- Money finishes: 4

Owen Crowe (born 1982) is a Canadian professional poker player from Halifax, Nova Scotia. As of 2011 he is known for having had four final tables in the past four years at the World Series of Poker (WSOP) in large-field US$1,000 or US$1,500 events, two top-100 finishes in the WSOP main events in the prior three years, and a 5th place finish at the 2013 PokerStars Caribbean Adventure main event. He was also successful in the inaugural Canadian Championships of Online Poker in 2010 and has greater online earning than live cash game earnings.

== Career ==
As of 19 June 2011, Crowe had 10 WSOP in the money finishes (2005 – 2, 2008 – 2, 2009 – 2, 2010 – 2, 2011–2) and a World Poker Tour cash finish. He has 4 final tables at WSOP events with average field size of 2714 – all in a smaller buy-in, large field No Limit Hold’em events. His final tables were 2008 – Event 36 8/2447, 2009 – Event 51 5/2781, 2010 – Event 45 2/3128, and 2011 – Event 28 4/2500. As of 19 June 2011, Crowe had US$1,684,993 live earnings.

As of 19 June 2011, Crowe had US$2,701,683 online earnings. He plays online under the name "ocrowe" at Full Tilt Poker, PokerStars and Ultimate Bet as well as "Adan12" at Full Tilt. In 2010, he made 3 final tables in 11 events during the inaugural Canadian Championships of Online Poker hosted by PokerStars. His largest online cash was at the US$10,000 Main Event at the 2008 WSOP when he earned US$436,201. His largest online prize was US$218,250 in a victory over a starting field of 2425 players in a $530 buy-in back in 2006.

== World Series of Poker ==
World Series of Poker results
Year	Cashes	Final Tables	Bracelets
2005	2		
2008	2	1	
2009	2	1	
2010	2	1	
2011	2	1	
2012	3		
2013	4		
2014	5		
2015	2		
2017	1		
2018	2		

=== Final tables ===
start	end	event	finish	field	prize
June 19, 2008	June 21, 2008	$1,500 No Limit Hold'em (Event 36)	8	2,447	$81,833
June 27, 2009	June 29, 2009	$ 1,500 No Limit Hold'em (Event 51)	5	2,781	$145,199
June 26, 2010	June 29, 2010	$ 1,000 No Limit Hold'em (Event 45)	2	3,128	$300,494
June 16, 2011	June 18, 2011	$ 1,500 No Limit Hold'em (Event 28)	4	2,500	$190,147

=== Main Event ITM ===
Year	event	finish	field	prize
2008	$ 10,000 World Championship No Limit Hold'em (Event 54)	15	6,844	$436,201
2009	$ 10,000 World Championship No Limit Hold'em (Event 57)	79	6,494	$68,979
