= Craig Marquis =

American poker player (born 1985)

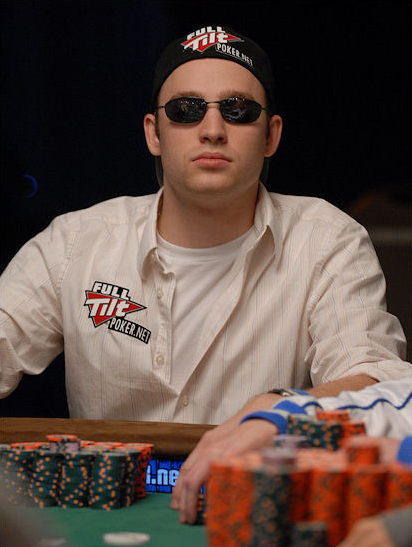
- Marquis at the 2008 World Series of Poker
- Born: March 14, 1985 (age 41)

World Series of Poker
- Bracelet: None
- Final table: 1
- Money finishes: 6
- Highest WSOP Main Event finish: 9th, 2008

Craig Marquis (born March 14, 1985) is an American poker player from Arlington, Texas, and a final table participant in the 2008 World Series of Poker Main Event.

He had three prior WSOP cashes, one in 2008 and two in 2007.

At the 2008 WSOP Main Event final table, Marquis was the first player to be eliminated, starting the table with 10,210,000 in tournament chips. In his last hand, with a little under 5,000,000 in chips, Marquis open raised all-in in the middle position with 7♦ 7♥. Scott Montgomery, in the cutoff position with over 11.5 million in chips, called with A♦ Q♥. The flop came 10♠ A♥ 7♣ giving Montgomery a pair of aces with Marquis making a set of sevens. However, the turn and river ran J♦ K♠ giving Montgomery a straight which eliminated Marquis in ninth place, earning him $900,670.

At the 2010 World Series of Poker, Marquis cashed twice. As of 2010, his total live tournament winnings exceed $990,000.
