= Ylon Schwartz =

American poker and chess player

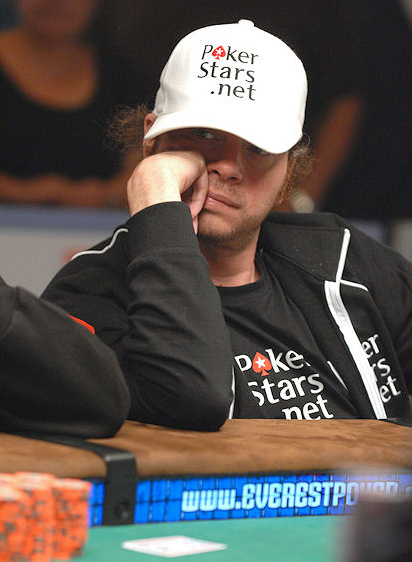
- Schwartz at the 2008 World Series of Poker
- Nickname: TenthPlanet
- Born: c. 1970 (age 55–56)

World Series of Poker
- Bracelet: 1
- Final tables: 4
- Money finishes: 24
- Highest WSOP Main Event finish: 4th, 2008

World Poker Tour
- Money finish: 1

European Poker Tour
- Money finish: 1

Ylon Schwartz (/ˈiːlɒn ˈʃwɔːrts/ EE-lon SHWORTS; born c. 1970) is a chess master and professional poker player from Brooklyn, New York, and a fourth-place finisher in the $10,000 World Championship No Limit Hold'em Main Event of the 2008 World Series of Poker (WSOP), played on November 9, 2008. Prior to the Main Event, Schwartz had 11 career WSOP cashes. He is also a World Series of Poker bracelet winner. He used to play poker professionally online under the screen name "TenthPlanet".

== Biography ==
As a teenager, Schwartz saw streetside chess games in Manhattan's Washington Square Park, and won two dollars playing his first game. He was soon a regular, hustling $100 per day playing chess against passersby. Schwartz reached a peak rating of 2408 United States Chess Federation, and as of 2008 his ratings stood at 2304 from the USCF and 2259 from FIDE. He has attained the title of FIDE Master with a ranking above 2300. Schwartz grew up as an only child in the New York City borough of Manhattan. A self-described uninspired student, he left the Borough of Manhattan Community College, having failed out of the school after a year. He took a number of jobs after flunking out of college. It was as a public school special education assistant that he started playing chess for a few dollars on the side. He soon devoted full-time to gambling on backgammon, chess, darts and horses.

An inveterate gambler, Schwartz made $340 from passersby on wagers that he would be able to throw a lemon across a street onto the top of a Burger King restaurant on the other side. Schwartz had practiced the throw the previous night and knew he could win the bets. Schwartz was introduced to Texas hold 'em by Fat Nick, a fellow backgammon player. Schwartz entered a pair of poker tournaments at a club run by Fat Nick in 2000, winning both and walking away with $12,000 and a new passion. Schwartz has drawn comparisons between his tournament experience as a ranked chess master, noting that many of the skills he needed to succeed in chess are useful in poker and that the memory skills needed in chess transfer to retaining details on betting patterns of opponents needed to win in poker. He also pointed out that chess strategy provides excellent preparation for knowing when to time bets to prevent other players from folding when he has a good hand. Schwartz observed that the two games share the geometric relationships between the pieces on the chessboard and those connecting the cards and chip stacks of fellow poker players, while recognizing that chess is a game of complete information, in contrast to poker.

Schwartz's mother was diagnosed with cancer, and he spent much of his time in his twenties caring for her and taking her to doctor appointments until her death in 2003. Ylon Schwartz's father, Neil, had left the family when Ylon was two years old. Neil made a number of attempts to contact Ylon over the years but it never worked out. The last time Ylon heard from his father was in the making the 2008 WSOP final table and Ylon refused to speak to him. His father remarried and now lives in New Mexico. Prior to Schwartz making it to the main table at the 2008 World Series of Poker, his biggest WSOP win was three years earlier at the 2005 World Poker Finals in the No-Limit Hold'em $500 buy-in event, in which his third-place finish brought him a payout of $49,960. On November 10, 2008, Schwartz was eliminated after going all in against Peter Eastgate and finishing the tournament in fourth place, earning $3,774,974.

On June 16, 2012, at the 43rd annual World Series of Poker Schwartz won his first bracelet in the $1,500 H.O.R.S.E. event for $267,081.

World Series of Poker bracelets
Year	Tournament	Prize (US$)
2012	$1,500 H.O.R.S.E.	$267,081

As of 2024, his total lifetime live poker tournament winnings exceed $5,100,000. His 24 cashes at the WSOP have netted him $4,431,689 in earnings.

Schwartz currently resides in Las Vegas, Nevada.
