= Michael DeMichele =

American poker player

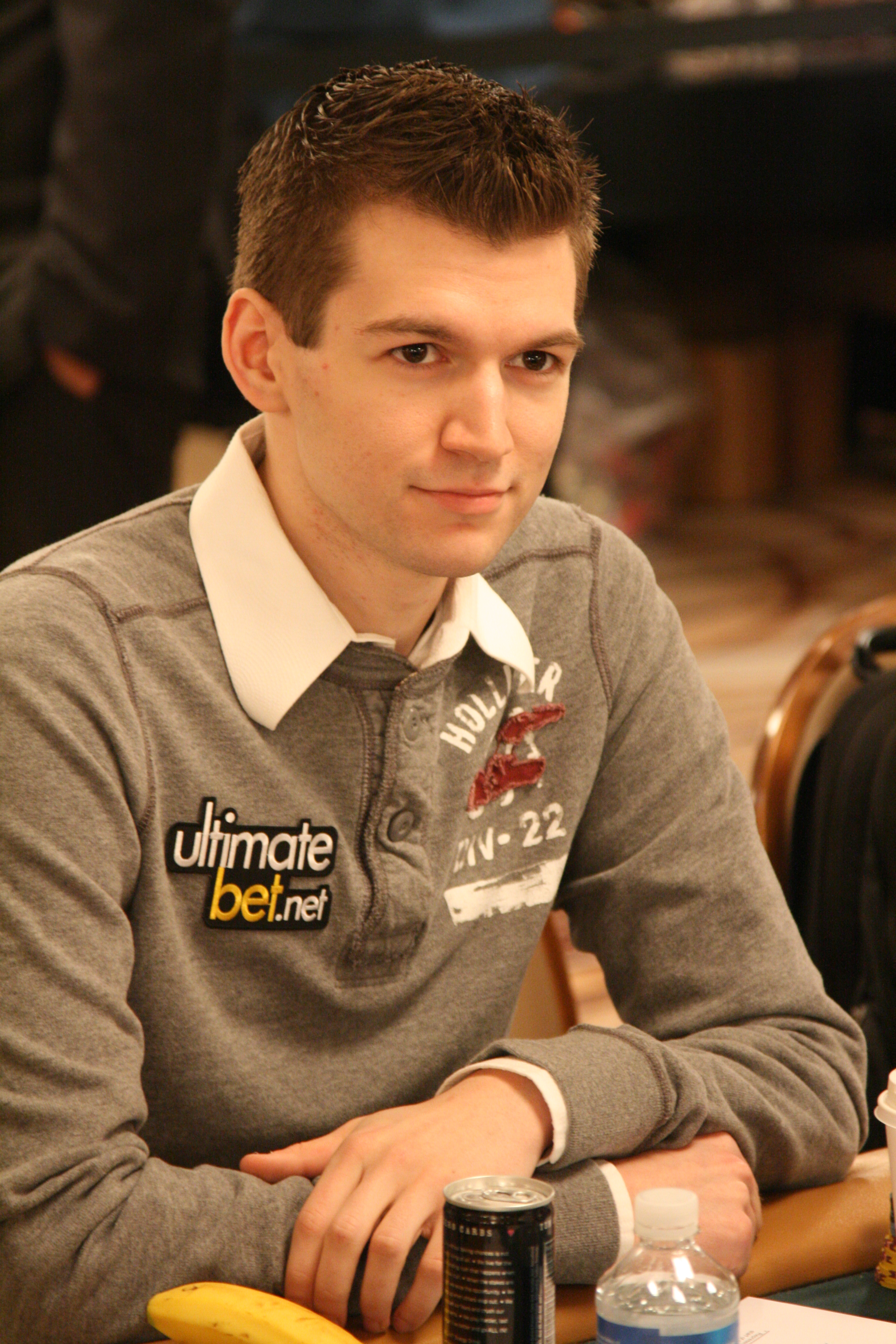
- Michael DeMichele at the 2008 World Series of Poker

World Series of Poker
- Bracelet: None
- Money finishes: 7

World Poker Tour
- Title: None
- Money finish: 1

Michael DeMichele is a professional poker player from East Haven, Connecticut. DeMichele's first major success in poker came in the 2006 United States Poker Championship Main Event, where he finished in 3rd place winning $215,194. Since then, DeMichele has cashed in some World Series of Poker events and has had success at the events he has cashed in. His biggest finish at the WSOP was in 2008, where he finished runner-up to Scotty Nguyen at the 2008 World Series of Poker $50,000 H.O.R.S.E. World Championship, earning $1,243,200, earlier that same year in the $10,000 World Championship Mixed Event, DeMichele finished 4th and earned $139,872.

As of 2009, his total live tournament winnings exceed $1,700,000. His seven cashes at the WSOP account for $1,426,770 of those winnings.
