= Alexandre Gomes =

Brazilian poker player (born 1982)

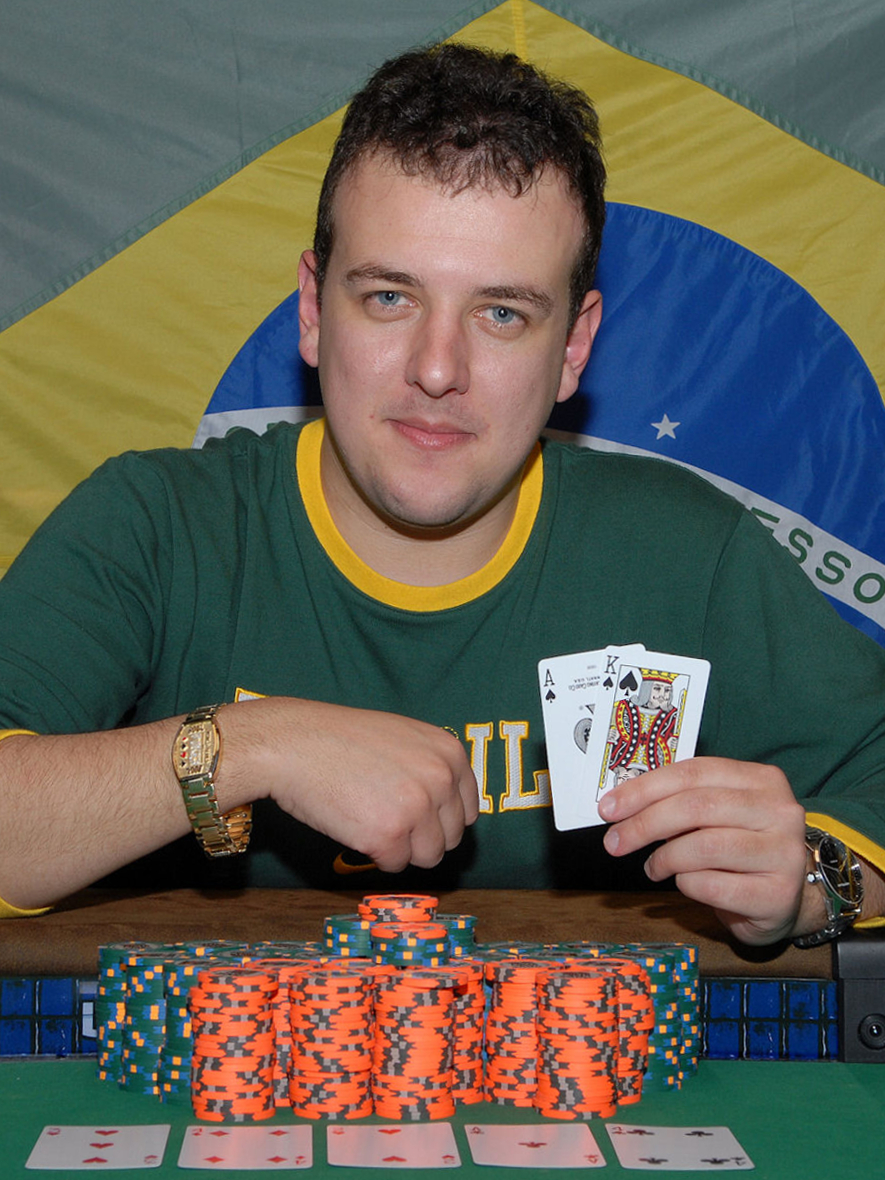
- Gomes after winning the $2000 No Limit Hold'em event at the 2008 World Series of Poker
- Nickname: Allingomes
- Born: 24 July 1982 (age 44); Curitiba, Brazil

World Series of Poker
- Bracelet: 1
- Final tables: 3
- Money finishes: 10
- Highest WSOP Main Event finish: None

World Poker Tour
- Title: 1
- Final tables: 4
- Money finishes: 6

European Poker Tour
- Title: None
- Final tables: 2
- Money finishes: 8

Alexandre Gomes (born 24 July 1982) is a Brazilian professional poker player. He is a World Series of Poker bracelet winner, a World Poker Tour champion and a former Team PokerStars Pro.

== Early life ==
Gomes is from Curitiba, Paraná, and holds a law degree. He began playing poker recreationally with friends, moved to online and then live tournaments, and later left his legal practice to become a professional player.

Before turning professional, Gomes finished runner-up in the $5,150 No-Limit Hold'em Championship Event of the 2006 World Series of Poker Circuit stop in Atlantic City, losing heads-up to American player Rick Rossetti and earning $202,433.

== World Series of Poker ==
Gomes became the first Brazilian World Series of Poker bracelet winner after defeating a field of 2,317 players in the 2008 World Series of Poker $2,000 No-Limit Hold'em event, earning $770,540.

=== World Series of Poker bracelets ===
| Year | Event | Prize Money |
|---|---|---|
| 2008 | $2,000 No-Limit Hold'em | $770,540 |

== World Poker Tour ==
On 20 July 2009, Alexandre Gomes outlasted 267 players to win the Bellagio Cup V, taking home $1,187,670 and a WPT title.

== European Poker Tour ==
At the European Poker Tour's PokerStars Caribbean Adventure, Gomes made the final table as chip leader with over 8 million in tournament chips after doubling through the former chip leader Kevin Saul. At the final table played on 10 January 2009, he finished in fourth place earning $750,000. In his last hand, Gomes held A♣ A♥ and made a fullhouse on a board of J♦ J♥ J♠ 5♠ Q♣ but lost when he ran against the four-of-a-kind of jacks of Benny Spindler who held the fourth jack, holding K♣ J♣.

As of 2012, his total live tournament winnings exceed $3,400,000.

== Personal life ==
Gomes is married with three children.

Since largely stepping back from the live tournament circuit, Gomes has worked as a poker coach, offering individual and group instruction based on his professional playing experience. Poker outlet PokerBrasil has credited his results with helping popularize poker in Brazil as a game of skill and strategy rather than chance.
