= Kelly Kim =

American poker player (born 1976)

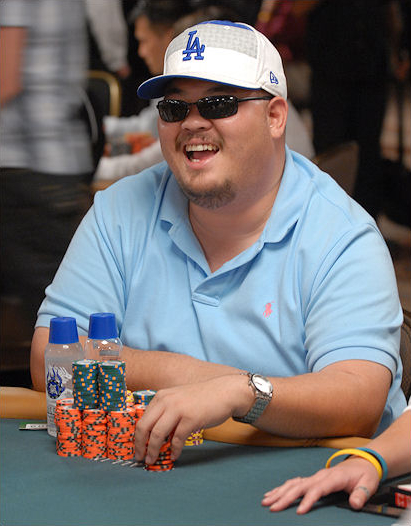
- Kim at the 2008 World Series of Poker
- Nickname: Kings
- Born: November 1976 (age 49–50); Los Angeles, California, U.S.

World Series of Poker
- Bracelet: None
- Final tables: 2
- Money finishes: 28
- Highest WSOP Main Event finish: 8th, 2008

World Poker Tour
- Title: None
- Final table: None
- Money finishes: 4

Kelly Kim (born November 1976) is a poker player from Whittier, California, primarily known for his 8th-place finish out of 6,844 entries at the 2008 World Series of Poker Main Event, earning $1,288,217. He was among the first group to be a part of the November Nine.

As of 2024, his total live poker tournament winnings exceed $2,000,000. His seven cashes at the WSOP account for $1,364,273 of those winnings.
