= Scott Montgomery (poker player) =

Canadian poker player (born 1981)

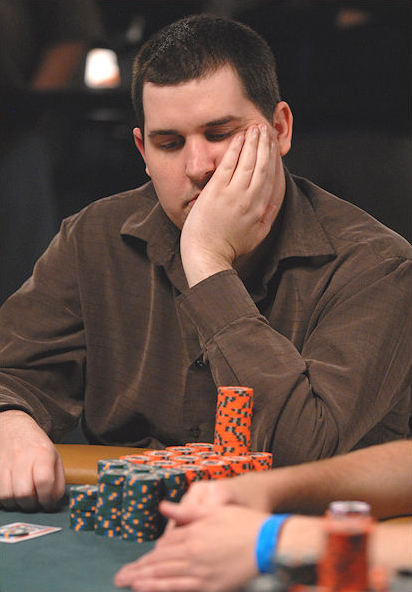
- Montgomery at the 2008 World Series of Poker
- Born: October 16, 1981 (age 45)

World Series of Poker
- Bracelet: 1
- Final tables: 2
- Money finishes: 16
- Highest WSOP Main Event finish: 5th, 2008

World Poker Tour
- Final table: 1
- Money finishes: 2

Scott Montgomery (born October 16, 1981) is a poker player from Perth, Ontario, Canada who won his first bracelet at the 2010 World Series of Poker in the $1,000 No-Limit Hold’em Event #36 and was one of the final table players in the 2008 World Series of Poker Main Event. He finished in fifth place earning $3,088,012, which was his fourth cash in the 2008 WSOP. He was eliminated by Peter Eastgate after going all in with A♦ 3♦. Eastgate had pocket sixes. Montgomery got an ace on the flop and another on the turn. Another player, Dennis Phillips, had folded a six, meaning Eastgate could only hit the 6♦ to win the hand. Eastgate hit his card, giving him a full house and eliminating Montgomery.

Montgomery also has two World Poker Tour cashes, including a fifth-place finish at the 2008 L.A. Poker Classic, which earned him $296,860.

== World Series of Poker bracelet ==
Year	Event	Prize Money
2010	$1,000 No Limit Hold’em	$481,760

As of 2024, his total lifetime live poker tournament winnings exceed $4,800,000. His 14 cashes at the WSOP account for $3,712,688 of those winnings.
