= Ivan Demidov (poker player) =

Russian poker player (born 1981)

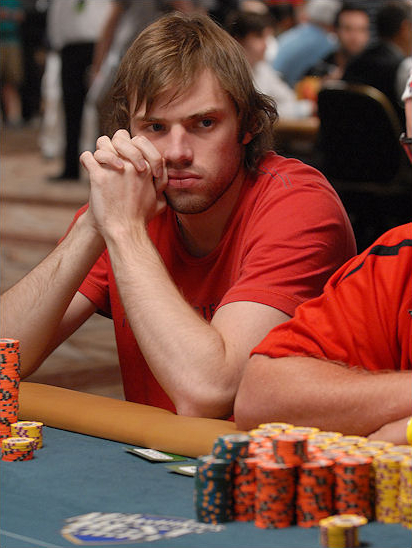
- Demidov in the 2008 World Series of Poker
- Born: 1981 (age 44–45)

World Series of Poker
- Bracelet: None
- Final tables: 2
- Money finishes: 10
- Highest WSOP Main Event finish: 2nd, 2008

European Poker Tour
- Title: None
- Final table: None
- Money finishes: 4

Ivan Demidov (Russian: Ива́н Деми́дов, IPA: [ɪˈvan dʲɪˈmʲidəf]; born 1981) is a professional poker player from Moscow, Russia.

Demidov is one of the original "November Nine", having made the final table of the World Series of Poker (WSOP) Main Event in 2008. He reached the heads-up stage along with Peter Eastgate. He lost to Eastgate and took second place for $5,809,595. Demidov stated that he would share his winnings with a Russian financial supporter who took him to some previous tournaments, with the backer getting more than Demidov.

In October 2008, he reached the final table of the World Series of Poker Europe Main Event in London, finishing in third place. In doing so, he became the first player in history to reach the final table of both WSOP Main Events in the same year. This feat was matched in 2009 by James Akenhead and Antoine Saout. Earlier in 2008, he finished in 11th place in a $1,000 no limit Texas hold 'em with rebuys event.

As of 2009, Demidov's live poker tournament winnings exceed $6,550,000. His four cashes at the WSOP account for the majority of those winnings, totaling $6,468,381. The vast majority of his poker earnings come from his strong runner-up performance in the Main Event in 2008.

As of 2012, Demidov is the highest-ranking member of the WSOP All-Time Money List who does not have a bracelet.

Demidov is also a former Warcraft III player who played under the name SouL.

Ivan is not the only professional competitor with his name, as he shares a name with the Montreal Canadiens's Ivan Demidov of the NHL.
