= Darus Suharto =

Indonesian poker player (born 1968)

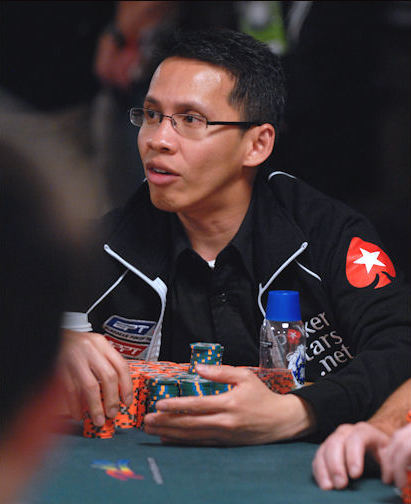
- Suharto at the 2008 World Series of Poker
- Born: 1968 (age 57–58); Sumenep, East Java, Indonesia

World Series of Poker
- Bracelet: None
- Final table: 1
- Money finishes: 4
- Highest WSOP Main Event finish: 6th, 2008

World Poker Tour
- Title: None
- Final table: None
- Money finish: None

European Poker Tour
- Title: None
- Final table: None
- Money finish: 1

Darus Suharto (born 1968) is a poker player born in Sumenep, Indonesia and currently residing in Toronto, Ontario, Canada, where he works as a Certified General Accountant at York University, and is a member of the Certified General Accountants of Ontario. Suharto finished 6th in the 2008 World Series of Poker Main Event, for which he earned $2,418,562. He had previously cashed in the Main Event in 2006, where he finished in 448th place. His three cashes at the WSOP have netted him $2,449,269, which accounts for the majority of his lifetime tournament winnings.
