= Peter Eastgate =

Danish poker player (born 1985)

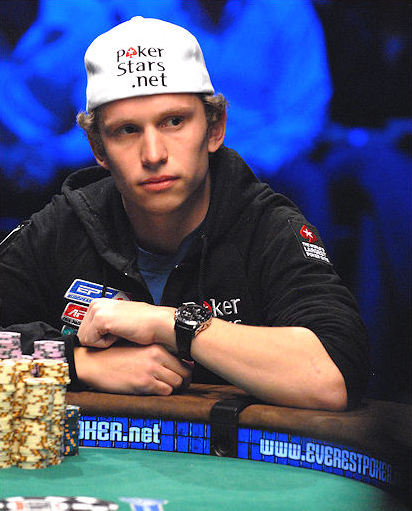
- Eastgate playing heads-up at the 2008 World Series of Poker Main Event.
- Nicknames: Icegate, Isser
- Born: 13 December 1985 (age 40)

World Series of Poker
- Bracelet: 1
- Final tables: 2
- Money finishes: 3
- Highest WSOP Main Event finish: Winner, 2008

European Poker Tour
- Title: None
- Final tables: 2
- Money finishes: 7

Peter Nicolas Eastgate (born 13 December 1985) is a poker player from Denmark, best known as the winner of the Main Event at the 2008 World Series of Poker. At the time, he became the youngest player ever to win the event, at 22 years, 10 months, and 28 days, just days short of a full two years younger than the mark set by Phil Hellmuth, Jr. at the 1989 event. The very next year, Joe Cada, eight days before his 22nd birthday, lowered the mark by a further 11 months, moving closer to the minimum possible mark of 21 years plus a few days. (Note: The youngest that a player is allowed to play poker in a Las Vegas casino is on their 21st birthday, and the size of the entry list for the Main Event necessitates a number of days of play before the field is reduced to the champion. In the 2009 event, Cada lowered the record to 21 years, 11 months and 23 days.)

== Early life ==
Eastgate was raised to English parents in Dalum, a suburb of Odense, Denmark. He went to Sct. Canute's Gymnasium, where he was introduced to poker by his classmates as he stated in season 5 of the show High Stakes Poker. He attended Aarhus University to study economics, but dropped out to play poker full-time.

== Poker career ==
=== World Series of Poker ===
Eastgate qualified for the Main Event via the Ladbrokes Poker website, and travelled to Las Vegas as part of Team Ladbrokes. Eastgate reached the final table with 18,375,000 in starting chips, the fourth largest stack behind Scott Montgomery (19,690,000), Ivan Demidov (24,400,000) and Dennis Phillips (26,295,000). Eastgate and Demidov reached the 2008 World Series of Poker (WSOP) heads-up stage. At the final hand, Eastgate had 120.4 million in chips, and Demidov went all in with 16.5 million chips. Eastgate beat Demidov at 2:33 AM local time, after a two-day final table consisting of 274 hands that took 15 hours and 28 minutes to play. Eastgate won the first place prize of $9,152,416.

By winning the Main Event at age 22, he became the then youngest WSOP Main Event champion, surpassing Phil Hellmuth, who was 24 when he won in 1989. He was surpassed as the youngest winner of the WSOP by Joseph Cada the following year at age 21

In 2009, Eastgate defended his Main Event title until day 6. He was eliminated in 78th place as a result of a rivered flush. He was the last remaining Main Event Champion at the time of his elimination.

World Series of Poker bracelets
Year	Tournament	Prize (US$)
2008	$10,000 World Championship No Limit Hold'em Main Event	$9,119,517

=== Other events ===
Prior to the WSOP, Eastgate's live tournament results included a final table finish at the 2007 Irish Poker Open and a money finish in the 2008 European Poker Tour event in Copenhagen. Eastgate's previous biggest win was $46,714 at the 2007 Paddy Power Irish Open. After his WSOP Main Event victory, Eastgate took to the tournament trail and quickly found success. He cashed in the European Poker Tour (EPT) PokerStars Caribbean Adventure (PCA) Main Event and then won the $5,000 side event for $343,000. Eastgate came second in the 2009 London EPT, winning £530,000. In 2010, Eastgate finished 5th in the NBC National Heads-Up Championship in Las Vegas for $75,000.

As of 2026, his total live tournament winnings exceed $11,130,000.

=== Hiatus ===
In July 2010, Eastgate announced that he was taking a break from poker in a statement through his sponsor PokerStars.com, saying, "When I started playing poker for a living, it was never my goal to spend the rest of my life as a professional poker player. My goal was to become financially independent. I achieved that by winning the WSOP main event in 2008. The period following has taken me on a worldwide tour, where I have seen some amazing places and met many new people; it has been a great experience."

“In the 20 months following my WSOP win, I feel that I have lost my motivation for playing high-level poker along the way, and I have decided that now is the time to find out what I want to do with the rest of my life. What this will be, I do not yet know. I have decided to take a break from live tournament poker, and try to focus on Peter Eastgate, the person. I want to thank PokerStars, my friends and family for their support over the last 20 months, and for their support in my decision to take a break from poker."

PokerStars said of Eastgate's decision: “We know that poker will miss this world-class player and world-class role model, but PokerStars has only the deepest respect for Peter’s decision. Poker is about determination and excitement, and if Peter lacks this in his game, the right decision is to take a break. Peter has played amongst world champions and he has carried his title in the most admirable fashion.” In November 2010, Eastgate put his main event bracelet up for auction on eBay with a starting bid of $16,000. It eventually sold for $147,500 and this money was donated to UNICEF.

In February 2011, Eastgate announced that he would be ending his eight-month break to return to poker. However, he has chosen not to play in any of the major tournaments since 2013.
