= Dennis Phillips (poker player) =

American poker player (born 1954)

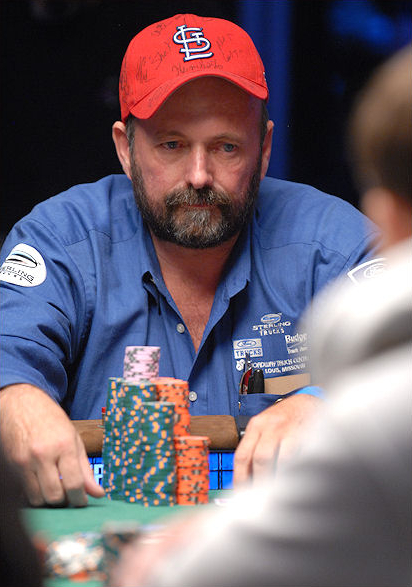
- Phillips playing at the 2008 World Series of Poker
- Nickname: Fordman
- Born: December 1954 (age 71)

World Series of Poker
- Bracelet: None
- Final tables: 4
- Money finishes: 8
- Highest WSOP Main Event finish: 3rd, 2008

Dennis N. Phillips (born December 1954) is a professional poker player from St. Louis, Missouri. Phillips qualified for the 2008 World Series of Poker (WSOP) Main Event through a $200 satellite tournament at Harrah's St. Louis, his local Harrah's casino. He entered the final table as chip leader with 26,295,000 in chips, and finished in third place, earning $4,517,773.

In his final hand, chip leader Peter Eastgate, with more than 62 million in chips, raised Phillips in the big blind 1.5 million in chips, Phillips called and the flop brought J♣ 3♠ 4♦. Eastgate, first to act, bet 1.5 million in chips, Phillips then raised the rest of his 14.4 million, all-in, and was called instantly by Eastgate, holding 3♦ 3♣ for a set of 3s to Phillips 9♥ 10♣. Phillips did not get the running straight cards necessary to win the hand, eliminating him in third place.

In the 2009 World Series of Poker, Phillips followed his third-place finish by finishing 45th, earning $178,857. Phillips also took third place in the 2010 NBC National Heads-Up Championship in Las Vegas for $125,000.

Dennis has also had two top 10 finishes in the WSOP Senior Event. In 2012, he finished second, earning $372,895. In 2014, he finished fifth, earning $153,883. These finishes make Phillips one of the few, if not the only, poker player to have three top 10 finishes and a fourth deep finish in tournaments with more than 4,000 entrants.

As of 2026, his total live tournament winnings exceed $6,000,000 and currently placed at 185th on the United States all time money list.
