= 2017 World Series of Poker results =

Below are the results of the 2017 World Series of Poker, held from May 31-July 22 at the Rio All Suite Hotel and Casino in Las Vegas, Nevada.

== Key ==
*	Elected to the Poker Hall of Fame
(#/#)	This denotes a bracelet winner. The first number is the number of bracelets won in the 2017 WSOP. The second number is the total number of bracelets won. Both numbers represent totals as of that point during the tournament.
Place	What place each player at the final table finished
Name	The player who made it to the final table
Prize (US$)	The amount of money awarded for each finish at the event's final table

== Results ==
=== Event #1: $565 Casino Employees No Limit Hold'em ===
- 2-Day Event: May 31-June 1
- Number of Entries: 651
- Total Prize Pool: $325,500
- Number of Payouts: 98
- Winning Hand: K♠ J♣

Final Table
Place	Name	Prize
1st	Bryan Hollis (1/1)	$68,817
2nd	Chris Solomon	$42,508
3rd	Josh Clanton	$29,372
4th	Jermel Stephens	$20,629
5th	Alex Cordova	$14,731
6th	Adem Arbuckle	$10,698
7th	Chris Gallagher	$7,903
8th	Vincent Russell	$5,941
9th	Victor Kim	$4,547

=== Event #2: $10,000 Tag Team No Limit Hold'em Championship ===
- 3-Day Event: May 31-June 2
- Number of Entries: 102
- Total Prize Pool: $958,800
- Number of Payouts: 16
- Winning Hand: A♥ 10♦

Final Table
Place	Name	Prize
1st	Liv Boeree (1/1); Igor Kurganov (1/1)	$273,964
2nd	Joe Kuether; Ankush Mandavia (0/1)	$169,323
3rd	David Benyamine (0/1); Mark Gregorich; Daniel Negreanu* (0/6); Eric Wasserson	$119,753
4th	Anthony Ajlouny; David Fong; Mike McClain	$86,237
5th	Javier Gomez; Lander Lijo	$63,253
6th	Martin Jacobson (0/1); Mark Radoja (0/2)	$47,271
7th	Antonio Gutierrez; Nam Le; J.C. Tran (0/2)	$36,008
8th	Michael Aron; Connor Drinan	$27,967
9th	Moritz Dietrich; Dietrich Fast (0/1); Jan Schwippert	$22,156

=== Event #3: $3,000 No Limit Hold'em Shootout ===
- 3-Day Event: June 1-3
- Number of Entries: 369
- Total Prize Pool: $996,300
- Number of Payouts: 50
- Winning Hand: A♠ J♣

Final Table
Place	Name	Prize
1st	Upeshka De Silva (1/2)	$229,923
2nd	Louis Helm	$142,115
3rd	Linglin Zeng	$103,449
4th	Jan Schwippert	$76,018
5th	Olivier Busquet	$56,397
6th	Casey Carroll	$42,246
7th	John Richards	$31,955
8th	Mark McMillin	$24,410
9th	Jean Gaspard (0/1)	$18,832
10th	Taylor Paur (0/1)	$14,675

=== Event #4: $1,500 Omaha Hi-Lo 8 or Better ===
- 3-Day Event: June 1-3
- Number of Entries: 905
- Total Prize Pool: $1,221,750
- Number of Payouts: 136
- Winning Hand: 10♣ 7♣ 5♠ 4♣

Final Table
Place	Name	Prize
1st	Benjamin Zamani (1/2)	$238,620
2nd	Jared Hemingway	$147,428
3rd	Alex Ferrari	$103,471
4th	Ryan Paluf	$73,647
5th	Gary Vick	$53,171
6th	Forrest Auel	$38,946
7th	Scott Buller	$28,948
8th	Martin Corpuz	$21,839
9th	Dustin Sitar	$16,726

=== Event #5: $565 The Colossus III No Limit Hold'em ===
- 6-Day Event: June 2-7
- Number of Entries: 18,054
- Total Prize Pool: $9,027,000
- Number of Payouts: 2,401
- Winning Hand: A♦ 6♦

Final Table
Place	Name	Prize
1st	Thomas Pomponio (1/1)	$1,000,000
2nd	Taylor Black	$545,042
3rd	John Hanna	$406,635
4th	Mark Babekov	$305,214
5th	Kent Coppock	$230,504
6th	Erkut Yilmaz	$175,162
7th	Ralph Massey	$133,940
8th	Matt Affleck	$103,063
9th	Luke Vrabel	$79,807

=== Event #6: $111,111 High Roller for One Drop No Limit Hold'em ===
- 4-Day Event: June 2-5
- Number of Entries: 130
- Total Prize Pool: $13,722,150
- Number of Payouts: 20
- Winning Hand: Q♠ 5♣

Final Table
Place	Name	Prize
1st	Doug Polk (1/3)	$3,686,865
2nd	Bertrand Grospellier (0/1)	$2,278,657
3rd	Dario Sammartino	$1,608,295
4th	Haralabos Voulgaris	$1,158,883
5th	Chris Moore	$852,885
6th	Martin Jacobson (0/1)	$641,382
7th	Rainer Kempe	$493,089
8th	Andrew Robl	$387,732

=== Event #7: $2,500 Mixed Triple Draw Lowball ===
- 3-Day Event: June 3-5
- Number of Entries: 225
- Total Prize Pool: $506,250
- Number of Payouts: 34
- Winning Hand: 8♦ 7♥ 5♣ 4♦ 3♦

Final Table
Place	Name	Prize
1st	Jesse Martin (1/2)	$130,948
2nd	James Obst	$80,922
3rd	Chris Bjorin (0/2)	$52,761
4th	Brant Hale	$35,349
5th	Jared Bleznick	$24,356
6th	Terry Jennings	$17,272

=== Event #8: $333 WSOP.com Online No Limit Hold'em ===
- 1-Day Event: June 3
- Number of Entries: 2,509
- Total Prize Pool: $752,700
- Number of Payouts: 333
- Winning Hand: Q♦ J♥

Final Table
Place	Name	Prize
1st	Joseph Mitchell (1/1)	$122,314
2nd	Mark Scacewater	$73,539
3rd	Michael Addamo	$54,044
4th	Hao Sun	$39,592
5th	Bobby McLawhorn	$29,205
6th	Michael Jacoby	$21,828
7th	Kevin Sheetz	$16,559
8th	Casey Long	$12,645
9th	William Pan	$9,710

=== Event #9: $10,000 Omaha Hi-Lo 8 or Better Championship ===
- 4-Day Event: June 4-7
- Number of Entries: 154
- Total Prize Pool: $1,447,600
- Number of Payouts: 24
- Winning Hand: 8♥ 8♣ 6♦ 3♦

Final Table
Place	Name	Prize
1st	Abe Mosseri (1/2)	$388,795
2nd	Daniel Negreanu* (0/6)	$240,290
3rd	Yarron Bendor	$166,895
4th	Fabrice Soulier (0/1)	$118,340
5th	Ilya Dyment	$85,702
6th	Ray Dehkharghani (0/1)	$63,419
7th	Anthony Zinno (0/1)	$47,975
8th	Mike Matusow (0/4)	$37,120
9th	John Monnette (0/2)	$29,391

=== Event #10: $1,000 Tag Team No Limit Hold'em ===
- 3-Day Event: June 5-7
- Number of Entries: 843
- Total Prize Pool: $758,700
- Number of Payouts: 127
- Winning Hand: A♠ 8♥

Final Table
Place	Name	Prize
1st	Nipun Java (1/1); Aditya Sushant (1/1)	$150,637
2nd	David Guay; Pablo Mariz	$93,074
3rd	Kiryl Radzivonau; Mikhail Semin	$65,190
4th	Charalampos Lappas; Georgios Zisimopoulos	$46,318
5th	Mukul Pahuja; Jonas Wexler	$33,391
6th	D.J. MacKinnon; Esther Taylor-Brady	$24,430
7th	Sam Cohen; Ryan Laplante (0/1)	$18,143
8th	Austin Buchanan; Lanie Foster	$13,680
9th	Joseph Choueiri; James Gibson; Rafael Lopez	$10,475

=== Event #11: $1,500 Dealers Choice 6-Handed ===
- 3-Day Event: June 5-7
- Number of Entries: 364
- Total Prize Pool: $491,400
- Number of Payouts: 55
- Winning Hand: K♥ 10♣ 10♠ 7♣ (Omaha Hi-Lo)

Final Table
Place	Name	Prize
1st	David Bach (1/2)	$119,399
2nd	Kevin Iacofano	$73,779
3rd	Christopher Sensoli	$47,629
4th	Scott Milkey	$31,550
5th	Anthony Arvidson	$21,460
6th	Wook Kim	$14,998

=== Event #12: $1,500 No Limit Hold'em ===
- 3-Day Event: June 6-8
- Number of Entries: 1,739
- Total Prize Pool: $2,347,650
- Number of Payouts: 261
- Winning Hand: K♦ 9♥

Final Table
Place	Name	Prize
1st	David Pham (1/3)	$391,960
2nd	Jordan Young	$242,160
3rd	Roman Korenev	$174,559
4th	Melissa Gillett	$127,180
5th	Kevin Trettin	$93,667
6th	Nathan Pfluger	$69,741
7th	Billy Rodgers	$52,503
8th	Huihan Wu	$39,969
9th	Aditya Agarwal	$30,774

=== Event #13: $1,500 No Limit 2-7 Lowball Draw ===
- 3-Day Event: June 6-8
- Number of Entries: 266
- Total Prize Pool: $359,100
- Number of Payouts: 40
- Winning Hand: J♠ 10♠ 7♣ 5♠ 4♣

Final Table
Place	Name	Prize
1st	Frank Kassela (1/3)	$89,151
2nd	Bernard Lee	$55,086
3rd	Tim McGuigan	$37,032
4th	Matt Waxman (0/1)	$25,451
5th	Jared Bleznick	$17,890
6th	Stuart Rutter	$12,868
7th	Benny Glaser (0/3)	$9,477

=== Event #14: $1,500 H.O.R.S.E. ===
- 3-Day Event: June 7-9
- Number of Entries: 736
- Total Prize Pool: $993,600
- Number of Payouts: 111
- Winning Hand: K♥ 3♥ 3♠ 2♠ (Omaha Hi-Lo)

Final Table
Place	Name	Prize
1st	David Singer (1/2)	$203,709
2nd	Kevin LaMonica	$125,904
3rd	Andrew Kelsall	$88,221
4th	Max Pescatori (0/4)	$62,733
5th	Michael Coombs	$45,281
6th	David Baker (0/2)	$33,184
7th	Kyle Loman	$24,696
8th	Esther Taylor-Brady	$18,669

=== Event #15: $10,000 Heads Up No Limit Hold'em Championship ===
- 3-Day Event: June 7-9
- Number of Entries: 129
- Total Prize Pool: $1,203,200
- Number of Payouts: 16
- Winning Hand: 5♠ 2♠

Final Table
Place	Name	Prize
1st	Adrian Mateos (1/3)	$336,656
2nd	John Smith	$208,154
SF	Charlie Carrel	$112,379
SF	Ryan Riess (0/1)	$112,379
QF	Ryan Hughes (0/2)	$54,986
QF	Olivier Busquet	$54,986
QF	Jack Duong (0/1)	$54,986
QF	Ryan Fee (0/1)	$54,986

=== Event #16: $1,500 No Limit Hold'em 6-Handed ===
- 3-Day Event: June 8-10
- Number of Entries: 1,748
- Total Prize Pool: $2,359,800
- Number of Payouts: 263
- Winning Hand: K♦ 10♠

Final Table
Place	Name	Prize
1st	Anthony Marquez (1/1)	$393,273
2nd	Demosthenes Kiriopoulos	$242,978
3rd	Daniel Weinman	$170,477
4th	Steven Buckner	$121,114
5th	Matt Berkey	$87,141
6th	Ilkin Amirov	$63,506

=== Event #17: $10,000 Dealers Choice 6-Handed Championship ===
- 3-Day Event: June 8-10
- Number of Entries: 102
- Total Prize Pool: $930,600
- Number of Payouts: 16
- Winning Hand: A♠ J♦ (No Limit Hold'em)

Final Table
Place	Name	Prize
1st	John Racener (1/1)	$273,962
2nd	Viacheslav Zhukov (0/2)	$169,323
3rd	Chris Klodnicki	$117,786
4th	Dennis Eichhorn	$83,263
5th	Mike Matusow (0/4)	$59,827
6th	Schuyler Thornton	$43,707

=== Event #18: $565 Pot Limit Omaha ===
- 3-Day Event: June 9-11
- Number of Entries: 3,186
- Total Prize Pool: $1,593,000
- Number of Payouts: 467
- Winning Hand: A♣ Q♦ 8♠ 7♠

Final Table
Place	Name	Prize
1st	Tyler Smith (1/1)	$224,344
2nd	Jason Stockfish	$138,655
3rd	Igor Sharaskin	$102,045
4th	Scott Davies (0/1)	$75,699
5th	Marek Ohnisko	$56,607
6th	Jessie Bryant	$42,673
7th	John Dallaire	$32,432
8th	Ryan Wince	$24,852
9th	Yves Kupfermunz	$19,201

=== Event #19: $365 The Giant No Limit Hold'em ===
- Starting Flights: June 9, June 16, June 23, June 30, July 7
- Conclusion: July 8-9
- Number of Entries: 10,015
- Total Prize Pool: $3,004,500
- Number of Payouts: 1447
- Winning Hand: K♥ 4♦

Final Table
Place	Name	Prize
1st	Dieter Dechant (1/1)	$291,240
2nd	Hrair Yapoudjian	$179,735
3rd	Vera Kuhl	$133,493
4th	John Hutchinson	$100,001
5th	Martins Kleins	$75,086
6th	John Myung	$56,856
7th	Marcus Laffen	$43,321
8th	Andrew Crookston	$33,210
9th	Michael Guzzardi	$25,610

=== Event #20: $1,500 No Limit Hold'em Millionaire Maker ===
- 5-Day Event: June 10-14
- Number of Entries: 7,761
- Total Prize Pool: $10,477,350
- Number of Payouts: 1,165
- Winning Hand: Q♣ J♦

Final Table
Place	Name	Prize
1st	Pablo Mariz (1/1)	$1,221,407
2nd	Dejuante Alexander	$754,499
3rd	Alexander Farahi	$561,530
4th	Marc Macdonnell	$420,805
5th	Bryce Yockey	$317,544
6th	Yuriy Boyko	$241,303
7th	Jonathan Gray	$184,663
8th	Thiago Grigoletti	$142,323
9th	Herbert Martin	$110,476

=== Event #21: $1,500 8-Game Mix 6-Handed ===
- 3-Day Event: June 10-12
- Number of Entries: 472
- Total Prize Pool: $637,200
- Number of Payouts: 71
- Winning Hand: K♣ 6♣ (No Limit Hold'em)

Final Table
Place	Name	Prize
1st	Ron Ware (1/1)	$145,577
2nd	Mike Ross	$89,948
3rd	Fabrice Soulier (0/1)	$58,968
4th	Sachin Bhargava	$39,545
5th	Christopher Vitch (0/1)	$27,142
6th	Ryan Himes	$19,077

=== Event #22: $10,000 No Limit 2-7 Lowball Draw Championship ===
- 3-Day Event: June 11-13
- Number of Entries: 92
- Total Prize Pool: $864,800
- Number of Payouts: 14
- Winning Hand: 8♦ 6♦ 5♦ 4♥ 3♦

Final Table
Place	Name	Prize
1st	John Monnette (1/3)	$256,610
2nd	Per Hildebrand	$158,596
3rd	Darren Elias	$110,944
4th	Xavier Kyablue	$79,016
5th	James Chen	$57,316
6th	Mike Gorodinsky (0/2)	$42,357
7th	Mike Leah (0/1)	$31,903

=== Event #23: $2,620 The Marathon No Limit Hold'em ===
- 5-Day Event: June 12-16
- Number of Entries: 1,759
- Total Prize Pool: $4,147,722
- Number of Payouts: 264
- Winning Hand: 10♣ 10♦

Final Table
Place	Name	Prize
1st	Joseph Di Rosa Rojas (1/1)	$690,469
2nd	Alexander Lynskey	$426,663
3rd	Jeff Tomlinson (0/1)	$307,728
4th	Tim Reilly	$224,316
5th	Julian Stuer	$165,277
6th	Faraz Jaka	$123,105
7th	Andrew Jernigan	$92,705
8th	Pratik Ghatge	$70,590
9th	Maurice Hawkins	$54,356

=== Event #24: $1,500 Limit Hold'em ===
- 3-Day Event: June 12-14
- Number of Entries: 616
- Total Prize Pool: $831,600
- Number of Payouts: 93
- Winning Hand: A♣ 5♣

Final Table
Place	Name	Prize
1st	Shane Buchwald (1/1)	$177,985
2nd	Sandy Tayi	$109,968
3rd	Ray Henson	$75,780
4th	Shane Fumerton	$53,102
5th	Nancy Nguyen	$37,850
6th	Hod Berman	$27,449
7th	Kevin Lizak	$20,261
8th	Mark Bassaly	$15,225
9th	Tung Tran	$11,652

=== Event #25: $1,000 Pot Limit Omaha ===
- 3-Day Event: June 13-15
- Number of Entries: 1,058
- Total Prize Pool: $952,200
- Number of Payouts: 159
- Winning Hand: A♥ A♣ 9♦ 7♦

Final Table
Place	Name	Prize
1st	Tyler Groth (1/1)	$179,126
2nd	Jonathan Zarin	$110,655
3rd	Allan Le (0/1)	$78,372
4th	Darren Taylor	$56,224
5th	Igor Sharaskin	$40,862
6th	Adam Brown	$30,090
7th	Daniel Spencer	$22,456
8th	Mark Zullo	$16,986
9th	Casey Carroll	$13,026

=== Event #26: $10,000 Razz Championship ===
- 3-Day Event: June 13-15
- Number of Entries: 97
- Total Prize Pool: $911,800
- Number of Payouts: 15
- Winning Hand: A♣ 2♥ 3♥ 5♣ 8♦ 5♥ A♠

Final Table
Place	Name	Prize
1st	James Obst (1/1)	$265,138
2nd	Eric Kurtzman	$163,867
3rd	David Baker (0/1)	$112,645
4th	Andrey Zhigalov	$79,616
5th	Anthony Zinno (0/1)	$57,903
6th	Brandon Shack-Harris (0/2)	$43,370
7th	Jyri Merivirta	$33,485
8th	Jack Duong (0/1)	$26,674

=== Event #27: $3,000 No Limit Hold'em 6-Handed ===
- 3-Day Event: June 14-16
- Number of Entries: 959
- Total Prize Pool: $2,589,300
- Number of Payouts: 144
- Winning Hand: A♦ K♥

Final Table
Place	Name	Prize
1st	Chris Moorman (1/1)	$498,682
2nd	Bernardo Dias	$308,166
3rd	Michael Gagliano (0/1)	$210,139
4th	Steve Sung (0/2)	$145,634
5th	John Gorsuch	$102,605
6th	Max Silver	$73,510

=== Event #28: $1,500 Limit 2-7 Lowball Triple Draw ===
- 3-Day Event: June 14-16
- Number of Entries: 326
- Total Prize Pool: $440,100
- Number of Payouts: 49
- Winning Hand: 8♦ 7♦ 6♣ 4♣ 3♦

Final Table
Place	Name	Prize
1st	Brian Brubaker (1/1)	$109,967
2nd	Brendan Taylor (0/1)	$67,952
3rd	Jason Riesenberg	$43,597
4th	Max Kruse	$28,740
5th	Dean Kerl	$19,482
6th	Rick Fuller	$13,591

=== Event #29: $2,500 No Limit Hold'em ===
- 4-Day Event: June 15-18
- Number of Entries: 1,086
- Total Prize Pool: $2,443,500
- Number of Payouts: 163
- Winning Hand: J♠ J♦

Final Table
Place	Name	Prize
1st	Gaurav Raina (1/1)	$456,822
2nd	James Calvo	$282,276
3rd	Asi Moshe (0/1)	$199,718
4th	Eddy Sabat	$143,148
5th	Eric Cloutier	$103,957
6th	Griffin Abel	$76,506
7th	Henri Stenhol	$57,068
8th	Giuseppe Pantaleo	$43,154
9th	Scott Margereson	$33,087

=== Event #30: $10,000 H.O.R.S.E. Championship ===
- 3-Day Event: June 15-17
- Number of Entries: 150
- Total Prize Pool: $1,410,000
- Number of Payouts: 23
- Winning Hand: A♥ J♦ 9♥ 8♠ (Omaha Hi-Lo)

Final Table
Place	Name	Prize
1st	David Bach (2/3)	$383,208
2nd	Eric Rodawig (0/1)	$236,841
3rd	Don Zewin	$163,557
4th	Andrew Brown (0/1)	$115,485
5th	Jason Mercier (0/5)	$83,415
6th	Daniel Negreanu* (0/6)	$61,667
7th	Yuebin Guo	$46,687
8th	Jerry Wong	$36,218

=== Event #31: $1,000 Seniors No Limit Hold'em Championship ===
- 3-Day Event: June 16-18
- Number of Entries: 5,389
- Total Prize Pool: $4,850,100
- Number of Payouts: 809
- Winning Hand: J♣ J♦

Final Table
Place	Name	Prize
1st	Frank Maggio (1/1)	$617,303
2nd	William Murray	$381,233
3rd	Dieter Dechant	$281,691
4th	Mark Lillge	$209,715
5th	Anthony Licastro	$157,321
6th	Gina Bacon	$118,923
7th	Lewis LeClair	$90,594
8th	Paul Spitzberg	$69,552
9th	Dan Heimiller (0/2)	$53,817

=== Event #32: $1,500 Omaha Hi-Lo 8 or Better Mix ===
- 3-Day Event: June 16-18
- Number of Entries: 688
- Total Prize Pool: $928,800
- Number of Payouts: 103
- Winning Hand: A♣ 10♠ 5♠ 4♥ 3♠

Final Table
Place	Name	Prize
1st	Vladimir Shchemelev (1/2)	$194,323
2nd	Howard Smith	$120,051
3rd	Nikolai Yakovenko	$81,568
4th	Igor Sharaskin	$56,400
5th	Usman Siddique	$39,696
6th	Yueqi Zhu	$28,449
7th	Erle Mankin	$20,767
8th	Jesse Simonelli	$15,445

=== Event #33: $1,500 No Limit Hold'em ===
- 3-Day Event: June 17-19
- Number of Entries: 1,698
- Total Prize Pool: $2,292,300
- Number of Payouts: 255
- Winning Hand: 5♦ 4♦

Final Table
Place	Name	Prize
1st	Christopher Frank (1/1)	$384,833
2nd	Ryan Leng	$237,776
3rd	Arkadiy Tsinis (0/1)	$171,208
4th	Pratyush Buddiga	$124,615
5th	Grant Denison	$91,699
6th	Georgios Sotiropoulos (0/1)	$68,226
7th	Noah Vaillancourt	$51,332
8th	Max Pescatori (0/4)	$39,060
9th	Michael Gagliano (0/1)	$30,063

=== Event #34: $10,000 Limit 2-7 Lowball Triple Draw Championship ===
- 3-Day Event: June 17-19
- Number of Entries: 80
- Total Prize Pool: $752,000
- Number of Payouts: 12
- Winning Hand: 8♥ 7♣ 5♣ 4♣ 2♥

Final Table
Place	Name	Prize
1st	Ben Yu (1/2)	$232,738
2nd	Shaun Deeb (0/2)	$143,842
3rd	Nick Schulman (0/2)	$98,337
4th	Mike Watson	$68,601
5th	Shawn Buchanan	$48,854
6th	Mike Matusow (0/4)	$35,532

=== Event #35: $1,000 Super Seniors No Limit Hold'em ===
- 3-Day Event: June 18-20
- Number of Entries: 1,720
- Total Prize Pool: $1,548,000
- Number of Payouts: 258
- Winning Hand: Q♠ J♠
- Note: James Moore won the event for the second consecutive year

Final Table
Place	Name	Prize
1st	James Moore (1/2)	$259,230
2nd	Kerry Goldberg	$160,120
3rd	John Isler	$115,357
4th	Veronica Daly	$84,005
5th	Ken Aldridge (0/1)	$61,842
6th	Darrell Ticehurst	$46,029
7th	David Smith	$34,641
8th	Daniel Favreau	$26,365
9th	Terry Stuhldreher	$20,296

=== Event #36: $5,000 No Limit Hold'em 6-Handed ===
- 4-Day Event: June 18-21
- Number of Entries: 574
- Total Prize Pool: $2,669,100
- Number of Payouts: 87
- Winning Hand: Q♥ 7♥

Final Table
Place	Name	Prize
1st	Nadar Kakhmazov (1/1)	$580,338
2nd	Chris Hunichen	$358,677
3rd	Kenny Hallaert	$238,855
4th	Sam Soverel (0/1)	$162,257
5th	Faraz Jaka	$112,484
6th	Christian Rudolph	$79,611

=== Event #37: $1,000 No Limit Hold'em ===
- 3-Day Event: June 19-21
- Number of Entries: 2,020
- Total Prize Pool: $1,818,000
- Number of Payouts: 303
- Winning Hand: J♦ 6♦

Final Table
Place	Name	Prize
1st	Thomas Reynolds (1/1)	$292,880
2nd	James Hughes	$180,919
3rd	Reginald Hampton	$131,061
4th	Eric Blair	$95,899
5th	Michael Gathy (0/3)	$70,884
6th	Vlad Darie	$52,932
7th	Chris Johnson	$39,937
8th	Chad Eveslage	$30,448
9th	Joep Raemaekers	$23,460

=== Event #38: $10,000 Limit Hold'em Championship ===
- 3-Day Event: June 19-21
- Number of Entries: 120
- Total Prize Pool: $1,128,000
- Number of Payouts: 18
- Winning Hand: 10♣ 5♠

Final Table
Place	Name	Prize
1st	Joe McKeehen (1/2)	$311,817
2nd	Jared Talarico	$192,717
3rd	Sorel Mizzi	$135,985
4th	Ben Yu (1/2)	$97,904
5th	J.C. Tran (0/2)	$71,949
6th	Robert Campbell	$53,995
7th	Ray Henson	$41,399
8th	Terrence Chan	$32,443
9th	Aaron Sacks	$26,000

=== Event #39: $1,000 No Limit Hold'em Super Turbo Bounty ===
- 1-Day Event: June 20
- Number of Entries: 1,868
- Total Prize Pool: $1,681,200
- Number of Payouts: 281
- Winning Hand: K♥ K♠

Final Table
Place	Name	Prize
1st	Rifat Palevic (1/1)	$183,903
2nd	Ryan Olisar	$113,581
3rd	Dean Blatt	$82,227
4th	Robert Heidorn	$60,132
5th	Rick Hollman	$44,424
6th	Joe Montervino	$33,160
7th	Gavin O'Rourke	$25,010
8th	George Dolofan	$19,063
9th	Victor Kim	$14,685

=== Event #40: $1,500 Seven Card Stud Hi-Lo 8 or Better ===
- 3-Day Event: June 20-22
- Number of Entries: 595
- Total Prize Pool: $803,250
- Number of Payouts: 90
- Winning Hand: 5♦ 7♥ A♥ 6♠ 6♣ 3♠ 4♥

Final Table
Place	Name	Prize
1st	Ernest Bohn (1/1)	$173,228
2nd	William Kohler	$107,063
3rd	Hal Rotholz	$74,200
4th	Tim Finne	$52,272
5th	Justin Bonomo (0/1)	$37,441
6th	Max Pescatori (0/4)	$27,275
7th	Shannon Petluck	$20,214
8th	Ted Forrest (0/6)	$15,245

=== Event #41: $1,500 Pot Limit Omaha ===
- 3-Day Event: June 21-23
- Number of Entries: 870
- Total Prize Pool: $1,174,500
- Number of Payouts: 131
- Winning Hand: K♣ K♠ Q♥ 10♥

Final Table
Place	Name	Prize
1st	Loren Klein (1/2)	$231,483
2nd	Chun Law	$143,017
3rd	Danny Wong	$100,360
4th	Jeff Williams	$71,423
5th	Jordan Spurlin	$51,559
6th	Oskar Silow	$37,762
7th	Timothy Batow	$28,066
8th	Sergej Barbarez	$21,172
9th	Benjamin Juhasz	$16,215

=== Event #42: $10,000 No Limit Hold'em 6-Handed Championship ===
- 3-Day Event: June 21-23
- Number of Entries: 332
- Total Prize Pool: $3,120,800
- Number of Payouts: 50
- Winning Hand: A♠ A♥

Final Table
Place	Name	Prize
1st	Dmitry Yurasov (1/1)	$775,923
2nd	Tommy Chen	$479,561
3rd	Jacob Powers	$308,783
4th	Artem Metalidi	$204,128
5th	Albert Daher	$138,644
6th	Kristen Bicknell (0/2)	$96,823

=== Event #43: $1,500 No Limit Hold'em Shootout ===
- 3-Day Event: June 22-24
- Number of Entries: 1,025
- Total Prize Pool: $1,383,750
- Number of Payouts: 120
- Winning Hand: K♠ K♦

Final Table
Place	Name	Prize
1st	Ben Maya (1/1)	$257,764
2nd	Thomas Boivin	$159,273
3rd	Tim West	$115,297
4th	Phachara Wongwichit	$84,453
5th	Alex Rocha	$62,602
6th	Steve Foutty	$46,969
7th	Joe Cook	$35,673
8th	Paul Michaelis (0/1)	$27,431
9th	Jonathan Little	$21,360

=== Event #44: $3,000 H.O.R.S.E. ===
- 3-Day Event: June 22-24
- Number of Entries: 399
- Total Prize Pool: $1,077,300
- Number of Payouts: 60
- Winning Hand: 4♣ 7♦ 8♣ K♦ 2♦ 6♥ 2♥ (Razz)

Final Table
Place	Name	Prize
1st	Matthew Schreiber (1/1)	$256,226
2nd	Phil Hui (0/1)	$158,361
3rd	David Steicke	$107,458
4th	Tom Koral	$74,382
5th	Ryan Himes	$52,542
6th	Matthew Honig	$37,892
7th	Ryan Hughes (0/2)	$27,910
8th	Brendan Taylor (0/1)	$21,007

=== Event #45: $5,000 No Limit Hold'em ===
- 2-Day Event: June 23-24
- Number of Entries: 505
- Total Prize Pool: $2,348,250
- Number of Payouts: 76
- Winning Hand: Q♥ 10♥

Final Table
Place	Name	Prize
1st	Christopher Brammer (1/1)	$527,555
2nd	Jett Schencker	$326,051
3rd	Yevgeniy Timoshenko	$223,574
4th	Rui Ye	$156,022
5th	Tobias Ziegler	$110,845
6th	Oliver Weis	$80,196
7th	Michael Brinkenhoff	$59,107
8th	Alex Foxen	$44,395
9th	Diego Sanchez	$33,993

=== Event #46: $1,500 Pot Limit Omaha Hi-Lo 8 or Better ===
- 3-Day Event: June 23-25
- Number of Entries: 830
- Total Prize Pool: $1,120,500
- Number of Payouts: 125
- Winning Hand: K♦ Q♥ J♣ 8♥

Final Table
Place	Name	Prize
1st	Nathan Gamble (1/1)	$223,339
2nd	Adam Hendrix	$137,992
3rd	Ray Henson	$96,555
4th	Michael Gross	$68,544
5th	Marco Johnson (0/2)	$49,379
6th	Miguel Use	$36,106
7th	Fernando Macia	$26,803
8th	Millard Hale	$20,205
9th	Wendy Weissman	$15,470

=== Event #47: $1,500 No Limit Hold'em Monster Stack ===
- 5-Day Event: June 24-28
- Number of Entries: 6,716
- Total Prize Pool: $9,066,600
- Number of Payouts: 1,008
- Winning Hand: K♥ 10♥

Final Table
Place	Name	Prize
1st	Brian Yoon (1/3)	$1,094,349
2nd	Ihar Soika	$675,995
3rd	Stanley Lee	$501,353
4th	Ryan McKnight	$374,515
5th	Yuliyan Kolev	$281,800
6th	Maurice Hawkins	$213,591
7th	Thomas Ryan	$163,087
8th	Richard Ma	$125,451
9th	Will Failla	$97,223

=== Event #48: $10,000 Seven Card Stud Hi-Lo 8 or Better Championship ===
- 3-Day Event: June 24-26
- Number of Entries: 125
- Total Prize Pool: $1,175,000
- Number of Payouts: 19
- Winning Hand: A♦ 6♠ 7♠ 5♦ 6♥ 5♣ 5♠

Final Table
Place	Name	Prize
1st	Christopher Vitch (1/2)	$320,103
2nd	Benny Glaser (0/3)	$197,838
3rd	Abe Mosseri (1/2)	$138,608
4th	Jameson Painter	$99,342
5th	Jonathan Duhamel (0/3)	$72,876
6th	Andrew Kelsall	$54,748
7th	Brock Parker (0/3)	$42,146
8th	Alex Luneau	$33,265

=== Event #49: $3,000 Pot Limit Omaha 6-Handed ===
- 3-Day Event: June 25-27
- Number of Entries: 630
- Total Prize Pool: $1,701,000
- Number of Payouts: 95
- Winning Hand: A♣ A♥ K♦ 10♣

Final Table
Place	Name	Prize
1st	Luis Calvo (1/1)	$362,185
2nd	Rudolph Sawa	$223,812
3rd	Mark Reilly	$149,258
4th	Eric Hicks	$101,513
5th	Aleksei Altshuller	$70,438
6th	Gerhard Schleicher	$49,885

=== Event #50: $1,500 No Limit Hold'em Bounty ===
- 4-Day Event: June 26-29
- Number of Entries: 1,927
- Total Prize Pool: $2,601,450
- Number of Payouts: 290
- Winning Hand: 8♥ 8♦

Final Table
Place	Name	Prize
1st	Chris Bolek (1/1)	$266,646
2nd	Bryan Emory	$164,735
3rd	James Gilbert	$119,479
4th	Tobias Peters	$87,516
5th	Zhaoxing Wang	$64,746
6th	Govert Metaal	$48,386
7th	Thomas Lutz	$36,530
8th	Richard Dubini	$27,865
9th	Dan Sindelar	$21,477

=== Event #51: $10,000 Pot Limit Omaha Hi-Lo 8 or Better Championship ===
- 3-Day Event: June 26-28
- Number of Entries: 207
- Total Prize Pool: $1,945,800
- Number of Payouts: 32
- Winning Hand: J♣ 9♦ 4♦ 2♥

Final Table
Place	Name	Prize
1st	Bryce Yockey (1/1)	$511,147
2nd	Jeremy Joseph	$315,911
3rd	Josh Arieh (0/2)	$216,077
4th	Chris Ferguson (0/5)	$150,929
5th	Quentin Krueger	$107,709
6th	Christopher Roth	$78,569
7th	Ray Henson	$58,612
8th	Kate Hoang	$44,738

=== Event #52: $1,500 No Limit Hold'em ===
- 3-Day Event: June 27-29
- Number of Entries: 1,580
- Total Prize Pool: $2,133,000
- Number of Payouts: 237
- Winning Hand: A♠ Q♣

Final Table
Place	Name	Prize
1st	Mohsin Charania (1/1)	$364,438
2nd	Cary Katz	$225,181
3rd	Brandon Ageloff	$161,844
4th	Andy Frankenberger (0/2)	$117,611
5th	Mikhail Rudoy	$86,424
6th	Samuel Phillips	$64,226
7th	Ian Steinman	$48,276
8th	Yanki Koppel	$36,708
9th	Milan Simko	$28,239

=== Event #53: $3,000 Limit Hold'em 6-Handed ===
- 3-Day Event: June 27-29
- Number of Entries: 256
- Total Prize Pool: $691,200
- Number of Payouts: 39
- Winning Hand: K♠ 10♦

Final Table
Place	Name	Prize
1st	Max Silver (1/1)	$172,645
2nd	Guowei Zhang	$106,694
3rd	Mickey Craft	$69,789
4th	Ayman Qutami	$46,871
5th	Lena Wang	$32,345
6th	Georgios Kapalas	$22,952

=== Event #54: $10,000 Pot Limit Omaha 8-Handed Championship ===
- 4-Day Event: June 28-July 1
- Number of Entries: 428
- Total Prize Pool: $4,023,200
- Number of Payouts: 65
- Winning Hand: A♣ 10♦ 3♦ 2♣

Final Table
Place	Name	Prize
1st	Tommy Le (1/1)	$938,732
2nd	Chris Lee (0/1)	$580,177
3rd	Hani Mio	$397,836
4th	Scott Clements (0/2)	$277,768
5th	Jason DeWitt (0/2)	$197,533
6th	Eoghan O'Dea	$143,128
7th	Murat Tulek	$105,705
8th	Miltiadis Kyriakides	$79,599

=== Event #55: $1,500 Seven Card Stud ===
- 3-Day Event: June 28-30
- Number of Entries: 298
- Total Prize Pool: $402,300
- Number of Payouts: 45
- Winning Hand: 10♥ 10♦ 4♠ K♣ 7♣ K♠ 2♣

Final Table
Place	Name	Prize
1st	Tom Koral (1/1)	$96,907
2nd	Tsong Lin	$59,894
3rd	Yueqi Zhu	$41,349
4th	Alexander Freund	$29,102
5th	Todd Bui (0/1)	$20,888
6th	Cheryl Denzik	$15,297
7th	Daniel Mogavero	$11,433
8th	Chris Tryba (0/1)	$8,726

=== Event #56: $5,000 No Limit Hold'em ===
- 4-Day Event: June 29-July 2
- Number of Entries: 623
- Total Prize Pool: $2,896,950
- Number of Payouts: 94
- Winning Hand: 9♠ 8♠

Final Table
Place	Name	Prize
1st	(Norberto) Andres Korn (1/1)	$618,285
2nd	Pete Chen	$382,122
3rd	Thomas Boivin	$264,306
4th	Marton Czuczor	$185,794
5th	Mike Sowers	$132,767
6th	Simon Lam	$96,472
7th	Andy Spears	$71,300
8th	Mark Zullo	$53,615
9th	Sergio Cabrera	$41,031

=== Event #57: $2,500 Omaha/Seven Card Stud Hi-Lo 8 or Better Mix ===
- 3-Day Event: June 29-July 1
- Number of Entries: 405
- Total Prize Pool: $911,250
- Number of Payouts: 61
- Winning Hand: A♥ 10♣ 8♦ 8♠

Final Table
Place	Name	Prize
1st	Smith Sirisakorn (1/1)	$215,902
2nd	Jameson Painter	$133,431
3rd	Jared Bleznick	$90,640
4th	Larry Tull	$62,796
5th	Samoeun Mon	$44,388
6th	John Sorgen	$32,026
7th	Barry Greenstein* (0/3)	$23,595
8th	Bonnie Rossi	$17,760

=== Event #58: $1,500 No Limit Hold'em ===
- 4-Day Event: June 30-July 3
- Number of Entries: 1,763
- Total Prize Pool: $2,380,050
- Number of Payouts: 265
- Winning Hand: J♦ 4♣

Final Table
Place	Name	Prize
1st	Artur Rudziankov (1/1)	$395,918
2nd	Mario Prats	$244,611
3rd	Timothy Miles	$176,455
4th	Arman Zolnoorian	$128,645
5th	Christian Rudolph	$94,799
6th	Lee Watkinson (0/1)	$70,618
7th	John Esposito (0/1)	$53,184
8th	Martin Kabrhel	$40,500
9th	Scott Lychwick	$31,187

=== Event #59: $2,500 Big Bet Mix ===
- 3-Day Event: June 30-July 2
- Number of Entries: 197
- Total Prize Pool: $443,250
- Number of Payouts: 30
- Winning Hand: A♠ 2♣ 4♣ 10♦ (Omaha Hi-Lo)

Final Table
Place	Name	Prize
1st	Jens Lakemeier (1/1)	$112,232
2nd	Jason Stockfish	$69,359
3rd	Andrew Kelsall	$47,239
4th	Jerry Wong	$32,804
5th	Ashton Griffin	$23,235
6th	Kenneth Fitzgerald	$16,793

=== Event #60: $888 Crazy Eights No Limit Hold'em 8-Handed ===
- 5-Day Event: July 1-5
- Number of Entries: 8,120
- Total Prize Pool: $6,489,504
- Number of Payouts: 1,120
- Winning Hand: K♠ 9♣

Final Table
Place	Name	Prize
1st	Alexandru Papazian (1/1)	$888,888
2nd	Kilian Kramer	$463,888
3rd	Harry Lodge	$344,888
4th	Ioannis Angelou Konstas	$257,888
5th	James Cappucci	$193,888
6th	Vlad Darie	$146,888
7th	Michael Tureniec (0/1)	$112,888
8th	Guillaume Diaz	$86,888

=== Event #61: $3,333 WSOP.com Online No Limit Hold'em High Roller ===
- 1-Day Event: July 1
- Number of Entries: 424
- Total Prize Pool: $1,335,600
- Number of Payouts: 54
- Winning Hand: 10♥ 10♠

Final Table
Place	Name	Prize
1st	Thomas Cannuli (1/1)	$322,815
2nd	Tara Cain	$201,408
3rd	Adam Owen	$136,231
4th	Daniel Zack	$97,232
5th	Darren Rabinowitz	$66,112
6th	Blake Kelso	$47,547
7th	Vincent Moscati	$34,859
8th	Ryan Jones	$26,178
9th	Millard Hale	$20,168

=== Event #62: $50,000 Poker Players Championship ===
- 5-Day Event: July 2-6
- Number of Entries: 100
- Total Prize Pool: $4,800,000
- Number of Payouts: 15
- Winning Hand: Q♦ J♠ 7♣ 5♥ (Omaha Hi-Lo)

Final Table
Place	Name	Prize
1st	Elior Sion (1/1)	$1,395,767
2nd	Johannes Becker	$862,649
3rd	Isaac Haxton	$595,812
4th	Ivo Donev (0/1)	$419,337
5th	Daniel Negreanu* (0/6)	$300,852
6th	Paul Volpe (0/2)	$220,111

=== Event #63: $1,000 No Limit Hold'em ===
- 3-Day Event: July 3-5
- Number of Entries: 1,750
- Total Prize Pool: $1,575,000
- Number of Payouts: 263
- Winning Hand: 10♦ 5♥

Final Table
Place	Name	Prize
1st	Rulah Divine (1/1)	$262,501
2nd	Patrick Truong	$162,170
3rd	Michael Amato	$116,940
4th	Yunsheng Sun	$85,226
5th	Ryan Hughes (0/2)	$62,785
6th	John Monnette (1/3)	$46,758
7th	Fabio Felice Cudia	$35,207
8th	Eddy Sabat	$26,806
9th	Jeffrey Silverstein	$20,640

=== Event #64: $1,500 No Limit Hold'em/Pot Limit Omaha 8-Handed Mix ===
- 3-Day Event: July 3-5
- Number of Entries: 1,058
- Total Prize Pool: $1,428,300
- Number of Payouts: 159
- Winning Hand: 10♥ 8♣ 7♠ 5♥

Final Table
Place	Name	Prize
1st	Sebastian Langrock (1/1)	$268,555
2nd	Ryan Laplante (0/1)	$165,983
3rd	Victor Choupeaux	$118,190
4th	Esther Taylor-Brady	$85,225
5th	Shannon Shorr	$62,242
6th	Zahir Gilani	$46,048
7th	Jerry Callahan	$34,515
8th	Fernando Brito	$26,216

=== Event #65: $1,000 No Limit Hold'em ===
- 2-Day Event: July 4-5
- Number of Entries: 1,413
- Total Prize Pool: $1,271,700
- Number of Payouts: 212
- Winning Hand: A♦ Q♣

Final Table
Place	Name	Prize
1st	Shai Zurr (1/1)	$223,241
2nd	Ognjen Sekularac	$137,909
3rd	Alex Foxen	$98,761
4th	Jonathan McCann	$71,540
5th	Erick But	$52,424
6th	Phong Nguyen	$38,869
7th	Aaron Hirst	$29,162
8th	John Brown	$22,143
9th	Joseph Liberta	$17,019

=== Event #66: $1,500 No Limit Hold'em ===
- 4-Day Event: July 5-8
- Number of Entries: 1,956
- Total Prize Pool: $2,640,600
- Number of Payouts: 294
- Winning Hand: 3♥ 3♦

Final Table
Place	Name	Prize
1st	Chris Klodnicki (1/1)	$428,423
2nd	Emile Schiff	$264,692
3rd	Schuyler Thornton	$191,453
4th	Benjamin Zamani (1/2)	$139,896
5th	Ulrich Schnetter	$103,281
6th	Darren Elias	$77,047
7th	Kenny Hallaert	$58,083
8th	Aditya Sushant (1/1)	$44,255
9th	Dylan Hortin	$34,083

=== Event #67: $25,000 Pot Limit Omaha 8-Handed High Roller ===
- 3-Day Event: July 5-9
- Number of Entries: 205
- Total Prize Pool: $4,868,750
- Number of Payouts: 31
- Winning Hand: A♦ K♥ Q♥ 6♦

Final Table
Place	Name	Prize
1st	James Calderaro (1/1)	$1,289,074
2nd	Alexey Rybin	$796,706
3rd	Esther Taylor-Brady	$543,713
4th	Artem Babakhanyan	$379,128
5th	Bryce Yockey (1/1)	$270,242
6th	Dario Sammartino	$197,007
7th	Dan Smith	$146,961
8th	Ben Tollerene	$112,239

=== Event #68: $3,000 No Limit Hold'em ===
- 3-Day Event: July 6-8
- Number of Entries: 1,349
- Total Prize Pool: $3,642,300
- Number of Payouts: 203
- Winning Hand: Q♣ Q♥

Final Table
Place	Name	Prize
1st	Harrison Gimbel (1/1)	$645,922
2nd	Chance Kornuth (0/1)	$399,132
3rd	Ryan Van Sanford	$285,148
4th	John Griffin	$206,119
5th	Christopher Farmer	$150,772
6th	Enio Bozzano	$111,619
7th	Vinicius De Silva	$83,644
8th	Kristopher Homerding	$63,457
9th	James Gilbert	$48,745

=== Event #69: $1,500 Razz ===
- 3-Day Event: July 6-8
- Number of Entries: 419
- Total Prize Pool: $565,650
- Number of Payouts: 63
- Winning Hand: K-9-7-A-6-4-7

Final Table
Place	Name	Prize
1st	Jason Gola (1/1)	$132,957
2nd	David Baker (0/1)	$82,174
3rd	Brad Ruben	$55,958
4th	Wendy Freedman	$38,847
5th	Benny Glaser (0/3)	$27,503
6th	Phil Hellmuth* (0/14)	$19,865
7th	Gerard Rechnitzer	$14,645
8th	James Schaaf (0/1)	$11,024

=== Event #70: $10,000/$1,000 Ladies No Limit Hold'em Championship ===
- 3-Day Event: July 7-9
- Number of Entries: 718
- Total Prize Pool: $646,200
- Number of Payouts: 108
- Winning Hand: 10♥ 10♣

Final Table
Place	Name	Prize
1st	Heidi May (1/1)	$135,098
2nd	Deborah Worley-Roberts	$83,459
3rd	Jana de la Cerra	$57,930
4th	Julie Dang	$40,843
5th	Katherine Ansorge	$29,256
6th	Alexis Sterner	$21,298
7th	Tiffany Lee	$15,760
8th	Meg Zampino	$11,858
9th	Karen Hodge	$9,075

=== Event #71: $1,000 WSOP.com Online No Limit Hold'em Championship ===
- 1-Day Event: July 7
- Number of Entries: 1,312
- Total Prize Pool: $1,246,400
- Number of Payouts: 136
- Winning Hand: J♦ 2♣

Final Table
Place	Name	Prize
1st	Nipun Java (2/2)	$237,688
2nd	Jason James	$146,203
3rd	Richard Tuhrim	$103,327
4th	Evan Jarvis	$73,912
5th	Vinny Pahuja	$53,595
6th	Jeffrey Turton	$39,511
7th	Sean Legendre	$29,415
8th	Steven Enstine	$22,186
9th	Stanley Lee	$17,076

=== Event #72: $10,000 Seven Card Stud Championship ===
- 3-Day Event: July 7-9
- Number of Entries: 88
- Total Prize Pool: $827,200
- Number of Payouts: 14
- Winning Hand: K♥ Q♥ 8♦ 7♥ 4♣ K♦ 8♣

Final Table
Place	Name	Prize
1st	Mike Wattel (1/2)	$245,451
2nd	Chris Ferguson (0/5)	$151,700
3rd	Perry Friedman (0/1)	$104,416
4th	Sean Mirrasouli	$73,810
5th	John Monnette (1/3)	$53,621
6th	Bryce Yockey (1/1)	$40,066
7th	Shaun Deeb (0/2)	$30,817
8th	David Benyamine (0/1)	$24,419

=== Event #73: $10,000 No Limit Hold'em Main Event ===
- 10-Day Event: July 8-17
- Final Table: July 20-22
- Number of Entries: 7,221
- Total Prize Pool: $67,877,400
- Number of Payouts: 1,084
- Winning Hand: A♥ 2♦

Final Table
Place	Name	Prize
1st	Scott Blumstein (1/1)	$8,150,000
2nd	Dan Ott	$4,700,000
3rd	Benjamin Pollak	$3,500,000
4th	John Hesp	$2,600,000
5th	Antoine Saout	$2,000,000
6th	Bryan Piccioli (0/1)	$1,675,000
7th	Damian Salas	$1,425,000
8th	Jack Sinclair	$1,200,000
9th	Ben Lamb (0/1)	$1,000,000

=== Event #74: $1,000 + $111 The Little One for One Drop No Limit Hold'em ===
- 6-Day Event: July 11-16
- Number of Entries: 4,391
- Total Prize Pool: $3,951,900
- Number of Payouts: 659
- Winning Hand: A♠ 10♠

Final Table
Place	Name	Prize
1st	Adrian Moreno (1/1)	$528,316
2nd	Martin Lesjoe	$326,314
3rd	Matt Berkey	$240,588
4th	Jimmy Guerrero	$178,764
5th	Richard Dixon	$133,868
6th	Giuseppe Pantaleo	$101,041
7th	Ricardo Ramos	$76,871
8th	Samuel Vonkennel	$58,953
9th	Alexandros Papadopoulos	$45,578
