= Philipp Gruissem =

German poker player (born 1987)

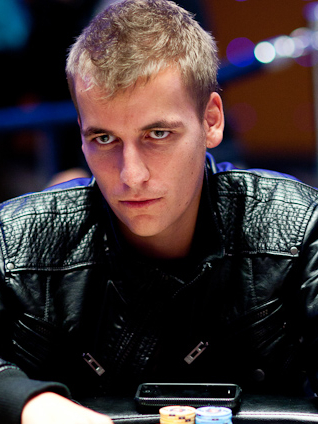
- Philipp Gruissem (2014)
- Nickname: philbort
- Born: 30 January 1987 (age 39); Krefeld, Germany

World Series of Poker
- Money finishes: 6
- Highest WSOP Main Event finish: 28th, 2011

World Poker Tour
- Money finish: 1

European Poker Tour
- Money finishes: 3

Philipp Gruissem (born 30 January 1987) is a German professional poker player from Krefeld.

== Poker career ==
Gruissem began playing live tournaments in 2009. He finished 28th in the 2011 World Series of Poker earning over $240,000. Gruissem's biggest live tournament cash is winning the 2014 European Poker Tour €25,000 High Roller event, earning $1,378,059.

Gruissem plays online under the nickname philbort. As of 2023, Gruissem live tournament winnings exceed $11,500,000 putting him tenth on the German all time money list.

== Personal life ==
Gruissem was born in Germany and currently resides in London. He co-founded the charity Raising for Effective Giving with fellow poker players Igor Kurganov and Liv Boeree.
