= Perry Friedman =

American poker player (1968–2024)

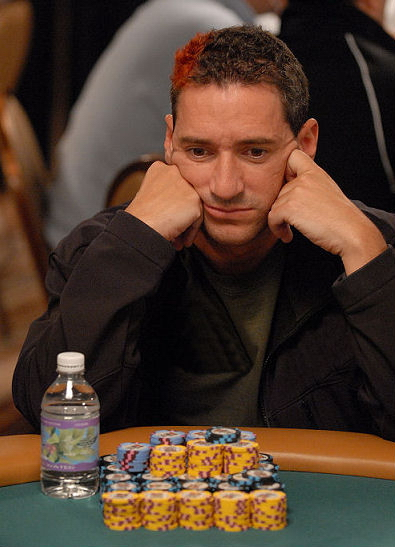
- Friedman playing at the 2007 World Series of Poker
- Nickname: The Baiter
- Born: May 15, 1968; New York City, U.S.
- Died: January 21, 2024 (aged 55)

World Series of Poker
- Bracelet: 1
- Money finishes: 50
- Highest WSOP Main Event finish: 526th, 2017

World Poker Tour
- Money finishes: 2

Perry Friedman (May 15, 1968 – January 21, 2024) was an American professional poker player who won the 2002 World Series of Poker $1,500 Limit Omaha Hi-Low Split-8 or Better event and was a founding member of the Tiltboys.

== World Series of Poker ==
Friedman won the 2002 World Series of Poker (WSOP) $1,500 Limit Omaha Hi-Low Split-8 or Better event, earning $176,860, he also has made seven other final tables, 3rd in the $2,500 Seven-card stud event at the 2000 World Series of Poker won by Chris Ferguson, 4th at the 2002 World Series of Poker in the $2,000 S.H.O.E. event won by Phil Ivey, 3rd in the $2,000 No Limit Hold'em event at the 2005 World Series of Poker won by Erik Seidel, 7th in the 2007 World Series of Poker $3,000 No Limit Hold'em event won by Shankar Pillai, 4th in the 2012 World Series of Poker $5,000 Seven-card stud event won by John Monnette, 3rd in the 2017 World Series of Poker $10,000 Seven-card stud event won by Mike Wattel, and 7th in the 2022 World Series of Poker $3,000 H.O.R.S.E event won by Lawrence Brandt.

=== World Series of Poker bracelets ===
Year	Event	Prize Money
2002	$1,500 Limit Omaha Hi-Low Split-8 or Better	$176,860

== Other poker events ==
At the World Poker Tour 2004 Legends of Poker, Friedman just missed making the six-player final table finishing in 9th for $49,575.

Friedman's total live tournament winnings exceeded $1,135,000. His 50 cashes at the WSOP account for $1,055,933 of those winnings.

== Death ==
Friedman died from complications after Pancreatic Neuroendocrine tumor surgery on January 21, 2024, at the age of 55.
