= 2018 World Series of Poker Europe results =

Below are the results for the 2018 World Series of Poker Europe, which took place from October 9-November 2 at King's Casino in Rozvadov, Czech Republic. There were 10 scheduled events, culminating in the €10,350 Main Event.

== Key ==
*	Elected to the Poker Hall of Fame
(#/#)	This denotes a bracelet winner. The first number is the number of bracelets won in 2018. The second number is the total number of bracelets won. Both numbers represent totals as of that point during the tournament.
Place	What place each player finished
Name	The player who made it to the final table
Prize (€)	The amount of money, in Euros (€), awarded for each finish at the event's final table

== Results ==
=== Event 1: €550 Colossus ===
- 7-Day Event: October 9-15
- Number of buy-ins: 2,992
- Total Prize Pool: €1,435,412
- Number of Payouts: 419
- Winning Hand: K♥ 10♥

Final Table
Place	Name	Prize
1st	Tamir Segal (1/1)	€203,820
2nd	Wojciech Wyrebski	€125,966
3rd	Aksel Ayguen	€92,385
4th	Dariusz Glinski	€68,331
5th	Hannes Neurauter	€50,971
6th	Francesco Delfoco	€38,349
7th	Flavio Decataldo	€29,104
8th	Krasimir Yankov	€22,281
9th	Bjorn Bouwmans	€17,209

=== Event 2: €1,650 No Limit Hold'em 6-Handed Deepstack ===
- 3-Day Event: October 14-16
- Number of buy-ins: 221
- Total Prize Pool: €318,074
- Number of Payouts: 34
- Winning Hand: A♦ 4♥

Final Table
Place	Name	Prize
1st	Asi Moshe (1/2)	€82,280
2nd	Robert Schulz	€50,842
3rd	James Bullimore	€33,149
4th	Giuliano Bendinelli	€22,210
5th	Van Tiep Nguyen	€15,303
6th	Viktor Katzenberger	€10,852

=== Event 3: €550 Pot Limit Omaha 8-Handed ===
- 4-Day Event: October 15-18
- Number of buy-ins: 572
- Total Prize Pool: €274,417
- Number of Payouts: 82
- Winning Hand: 9♦ 7♥ 6♥ 4♣

Final Table
Place	Name	Prize
1st	Hanh Tran (2/2)	€59,623
2nd	Oleg Pavlyuchuk	€36,851
3rd	Romain Lewis	€25,473
4th	Sebastian Obermeier	€17,905
5th	Tarek Sleiman	€12,802
6th	Manish Goenka	€9,313
7th	Michael Magalashvili	€6,896
8th	Florian Sarnow	€5,198

=== Event 4: €1,100 No Limit Hold'em Turbo Bounty Hunter ===
- 1-Day Event: October 17
- Number of buy-ins: 387
- Total Prize Pool: €371,326
- Number of Payouts: 59
- Winning Hand: Q♦ 2♦

Final Table
Place	Name	Prize
1st	Mykhailo Gutyi (1/1)	€61,000
2nd	Florian Sarnow	€37,678
3rd	Vangelis Kaimakamis	€25,468
4th	Angelos Pettas	€17,565
5th	Darko Stojanovic (0/1)	€12,367
6th	Kale Halstead	€8,891
7th	Philipp Zukernik	€6,531
8th	Andrey Ivlev	€4,904
9th	Luca Marchetti	€3,765

=== Event 5: €1,100 Monster Stack ===
- 5-Day Event: October 18-22
- Number of buy-ins: 666
- Total Prize Pool: €639,027
- Number of Payouts: 100
- Winning Hand: J♦ 9♣

Final Table
Place	Name	Prize
1st	Timur Margolin (2/2)	€134,407
2nd	Raul Villarroel	€83,042
3rd	Sebastian Ulrich	€57,447
4th	Henrik Brockmann	€40,388
5th	Michal Mrakes	€28,863
6th	Mykhailo Gutyi (1/1)	€20,974
7th	Tamas Szunyoghy	€15,502
8th	Amar Begovic	€11,656
9th	Mario Llapi	€8,920

=== Event 6: €1,650 Mixed PLO/NLHE ===
- 3-Day Event: October 21-23
- Number of buy-ins: 241
- Total Prize Pool: €343,425
- Number of Payouts: 37
- Winning Hand: A♦ A♥ 6♥ 3♥

Final Table
Place	Name	Prize
1st	Norbert Szecsi (1/2)	€86,956
2nd	Shaun Deeb (2/4)	€63,731
3rd	Netanel Amedi	€36,705
4th	Julien Sitbon	€25,618
5th	Samuel Albeck	€18,276
6th	Jaroslav Peter	€13,334
7th	Vittorio Castro	€9,953
8th	Van Tiep Nguyen	€7,606

=== Event 7: €2,200 Pot Limit Omaha 8-Handed ===
- 3-Day Event: October 22-24
- Number of buy-ins: 187
- Total Prize Pool: €358,853
- Number of Payouts: 29
- Winning Hand: K♥ 6♥ 3♥ 3♠

Final Table
Place	Name	Prize
1st	Anson Tsang (1/1)	€91,730
2nd	Ilya Bulychev	€56,684
3rd	Jason Gray	€39,508
4th	Quan Zhou	€28,100
5th	Ludvig Sterner	€20,405
6th	Hokyiu Lee	€15,134
7th	Gisle Olsen	€11,469
8th	Alexander Norden	€8,886

=== Event 8: €25,500 Super High Roller ===
- 2-Day Event: October 24-25
- Number of buy-ins: 133
- Total Prize Pool: €3,158,750
- Number of Payouts: 20
- Winning Hand: 5♥ 5♦

Final Table
Place	Name	Prize
1st	Michael Addamo (2/2)	€848,702
2nd	Christian Rudolph	€524,532
3rd	Benjamin Pollak	€370,219
4th	Mikita Badziakouski	€266,767
5th	Dominik Nitsche (0/4)	€196,328
6th	Winfred Yu	€147,642
7th	James Romero	€113,505
8th	Manig Löser	€89,253

=== Event 9: €100,000 King's Super High Roller ===
- 3-Day Event: October 26-28
- Number of buy-ins: 95
- Total Prize Pool: €9,025,000
- Number of Payouts: 15
- Winning Hand: 6♦ 6♠

Final Table
Place	Name	Prize
1st	Martin Kabrhel (1/2)	€2,624,340
2nd	David Peters (0/1)	€1,621,960
3rd	Julian Thomas	€1,116,308
4th	Mikita Badziakouski	€789,612
5th	Dominik Nitsche (0/4)	€574,466
6th	Jan Eric Schwippert	€430,217
7th	Adrian Mateos (0/3)	€331,943
8th	Michael Addamo (2/2)	€264,110

=== Event 10: €10,350 Main Event ===
- 7-Day Event: October 27-November 2
- Number of buy-ins: 534
- Total Prize Pool: €5,073,000
- Number of Payouts: 81
- Winning Hand: Q♥ 9♣

Final Table
Place	Name	Prize
1st	Jack Sinclair (1/1)	€1,122,239
2nd	Laszlo Bujtas	€693,573
3rd	Krasimir Yankov	€480,028
4th	Ryan Riess (0/1)	€337,778
5th	Milos Skrbic	€241,718
6th	Ihor Yerofieiev	€175,965
7th	Koray Aldemir	€130,350
8th	Bulscu Lukacs	€98,287
