= 2020 World Series of Poker =

Series of poker tournaments

- Location: Rio All-Suite Hotel and Casino, Las Vegas, Nevada; King's Casino, Rozvadov, Czech Republic; Online (GGPoker and WSOP.com)
- Dates: November 29 – January 3

Champion
- (Argentina) Damian Salas

The 2020 World Series of Poker (WSOP) was the 51st edition of the event. Originally scheduled to begin on May 26 at the Rio All-Suite Hotel and Casino in Las Vegas, Nevada, it was postponed due to the COVID-19 pandemic.

There were 101 bracelet events on the schedule before the postponement.

In June, the WSOP introduced the 2020 World Series of Poker Online, a series of 85 online tournaments, 31 on WSOP.com and 54 on GGPoker. The series started on July 1 and concluded in September.

In November, the WSOP announced that the $10,000 No Limit Hold'em Main Event would still be held, but in a different format. Play began online, with international players starting November 29 on GGPoker and American players December 13 on WSOP.com. Once both tournaments reached the final nine players, a final table was held live—December 15 at King's Casino in Rozvadov, Czech Republic for international players, and December 28 at the Rio for American players. The winners of both final tables then met in a heads-up match at the Rio on January 3 to determine the champion.

== Main Event ==
The $10,000 No Limit Hold'em Main Event began on November 29 with the first of three starting flights on GGPoker. The surviving players from each flight combined for Day 2 on December 7 and played down to a final table of nine. The final table was held on December 15 at King's Casino in Rozvadov, Czech Republic.

For American players, the event began on December 13 on WSOP.com, with the final table taking place on December 28.

The Main Event on GGPoker attracted 674 players, creating a prize pool of $6,470,400. The top 80 players made the money, with the winner earning $1,550,969.

The WSOP.com Main Event had 705 entries and a prize pool of $6,768.000. The top 107 players made the money, with a first place prize of $1,553,256. In addition, the champion of the heads-up match between the GGPoker and WSOP.com winners earned $1 million. The match was originally scheduled to take place on December 30 but was moved to January 3 after Damian Salas, winner of the Rozvadov final table, was denied entry into the United States.

Combined, the 2020 Main Event attracted 1,379 players.

=== Performance of past champions ===
Name	Championship Year(s)	Day of Elimination
Phil Hellmuth	1989	1
Chris Ferguson	2000	1
Greg Raymer	2004	1
Greg Merson	2012	1 (=179th)*
Ryan Riess	2013	2 (=93rd)*
Martin Jacobson	2014	1C
Joe McKeehen	2015	1
Scott Blumstein	2017	1
John Cynn	2018	1

*- Denotes player who finished in the money

=== Other high finishes ===
NB: This list is restricted to top 100 finishers with an existing Wikipedia entry.

Place	Name	Prize	Competition
21st	Daniel Zack	$77,832	Las Vegas
43rd	Maria Ho	$35,194	Las Vegas
63rd	Jason Somerville	$29,779	Las Vegas
65th	Joseph Cheong	$29,779	Las Vegas
77th	Scott Seiver	$25,718	Las Vegas
91st	Freddy Deeb	$22,334	Las Vegas
93rd	Ryan Riess	$22,334	Las Vegas

=== Final Tables ===
Rozvadov final table
Name	Number of chips (percentage of total)	WSOP bracelets	WSOP cashes*	WSOP earnings*
(Brazil) Brunno Botteon	10,325,000 (25.5%)	0	14	$1,108,516
(Portugal) Manuel Ruivo	6,225,000 (15.4%)	0	10	$329,545
(Argentina) Damian Salas	5,650,000 (14.0%)	0	30	$1,710,970
(Switzerland) Marco Streda	4,225,000 (10.5%)	0	0	0
(Austria) Hannes Speiser	3,525,000 (8.7%)	0	7	$105,193
(Lithuania) Dominykas Mikolaitis	3,175,000 (7.8%)	0	12	$132,857
(Spain) Ramon Miquel Munoz	3,025,000 (7.5%)	0	16	$52,231
(China) Peiyuan Sun	2,185,676 (5.4%)	0	3	$5,907
(Bulgaria) Stoyan Obreshkov	2,125,000 (5.2%)	0	37	$400,718

Las Vegas final table
Name	Number of chips (percentage of total)	WSOP bracelets	WSOP cashes*	WSOP earnings*
(United States) Joseph Hebert	13,050,000 (30.9%)	0	17	$84,960
(United States) Shawn Stroke	5,250,000 (12.4%)	0	12	$125,240
(United States) Ryan Hagerty	5,075,000 (12.0%)	0	9	$30,331
(China) Tony Yuan	4,825,000 (11.4%)	0	4	$4,218
(United States) Michael Cannon	4,400,000 (10.4%)	0	3	$7,313
(United States) Gershon Distenfeld	3,475,000 (8.2%)	0	2	$5,317
(United States) Ron Jenkins	2,475,000 (5.9%)	0	14	$117,685
(Sri Lanka) Upeshka De Silva	2,151,969 (5.1%)	3	49	$1,613,094
(United States) Harrison Dobin	1,575,000 (3.7%)	0	8	$46,592

*- Career statistics prior to the 2020 Main Event

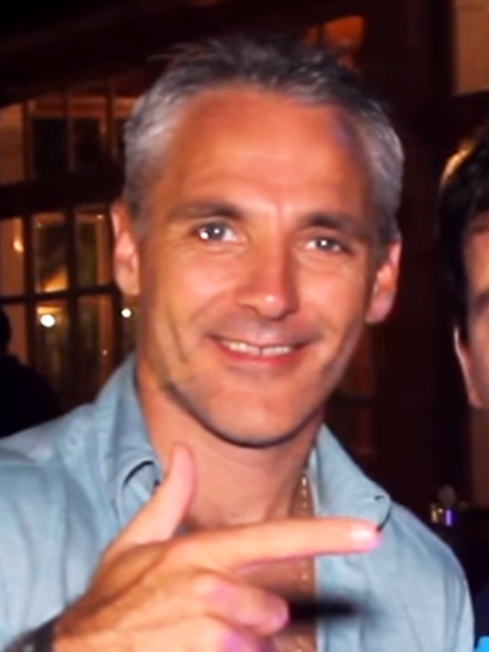
Main Event champion Damian Salas

=== Final Tables results ===
Rozvadov final table results
Place	Name	Prize
1st	Damian Salas	$1,550,969
2nd	Brunno Botteon	$1,062,723
3rd	Manuel Ruivo	$728,177
4th	Ramon Miquel Munoz	$498,947
5th	Marco Streda	$341,879
6th	Dominykas Mikolaitis	$234,255
7th	Stoyan Obreshkov	$160,512
8th	Hannes Speiser	$109,982
9th	Peiyuan Sun*	$75,360

Las Vegas final table results
Place	Name	Prize
1st	Joseph Hebert	$1,553,256
2nd	Ron Jenkins	$1,002,340
3rd	Michael Cannon	$529,258
4th	Ryan Hagerty	$387,130
5th	Tony Yuan	$286,963
6th	Harrison Dobin	$215,222
7th	Shawn Stroke	$163,786
8th	Gershon Distenfeld	$125,885
9th	Upeshka De Silva**	$98,813

*- Sun did not travel to Rozvadov for the final table and was awarded ninth place
**- De Silva was disqualified after testing positive for COVID-19 and awarded ninth place

=== Heads-up Championship Match results ===
Heads-up Championship Match results
Place	Name	Prize
1st	Damian Salas	$1,000,000
2nd	Joseph Hebert	$0
