= Joseph Hebert =

American poker player

World Series of Poker
- Final table: 1
- Money finishes: 18
- Highest WSOP Main Event finish: 2nd, 2020

Joseph Hebert is an American professional poker player from Metairie, Louisiana. In 2020, he finished runner-up in the World Series of Poker Main Event.

Hebert has worked part-time as a waiter at The Galley Seafood restaurant in Metairie. His first WSOP cash came in 2014. Prior to the 2020 Main Event, he had 18 career WSOP cashes, including three at the 2020 WSOP Online. He also has 18 cashes on the WSOP Circuit, finishing runner-up in a Main Event in New Orleans in 2013 for $140,000. In January 2020, he won a $2,000 No Limit Hold'em event in Biloxi for $74,000.

Hebert qualified for the WSOP.com portion of the 2020 Main Event in a $300 satellite. Playing as "kolebear," he made the final table with a commanding chip lead, more than double any other player. On the first hand of heads-up play, he knocked out Ron Jenkins with A♣ Q♠ against Q♦ Q♣ after an ace came on the flop. Hebert earned $1,553,256 for the win and advanced to play Damian Salas in the heads-up championship match on January 3 at the Rio All-Suite Hotel and Casino in Las Vegas. Hebert lost to Salas after his A♦ Q♠ was beaten by K♦ J♠ on the 173rd hand of play.

Hebert has a son. His mother, Linda, died in July 2020; he dedicated his Main Event run to her memory.
