= Raising for Effective Giving =

Charity fundraising organization

- Logo as of May 2016
- Abbreviation: REG
- Formation: 3 July 2014
- Founders: Liv Boeree, Igor Kurganov, Philipp Gruissem, Effective Altruism Foundation
- Founded at: 2014 World Series of Poker in Las Vegas, United States
- Type: Charity fundraiser, NGO
- Parent organization: Effective Altruism Foundation
- Website: reg-charity.org

Raising for Effective Giving (REG) is a charity fundraising nonprofit. Its members consist mostly of professional poker players and financial investors who pledge to donate a percentage of their income to selected charities.

== Philosophy ==
REG was founded based on the view that in order to reduce suffering in the developing world, people in the developed world should donate to particularly effective charity organizations. REG donates to, and recommends, selected charities based on their cost-effectiveness. One criterion in the cost-effectiveness evaluations is how much money the charity requires to save a life.

REG's outreach focuses on professional poker players, because it believes that they have strong quantitative skills, making them better suited for REG's messages about cost-effectiveness. In addition, poker is a large industry with substantial monetary prizes.

== Activities ==
There are 87 members of REG, who have each pledged to donate at least 2% of their income. Recipients included Against Malaria Foundation, the Machine Intelligence Research Institute (MIRI), the Center for Applied Rationality (CFAR), GiveDirectly, GiveWell, Schistosomiasis Control Initiative, The Humane League, Mercy For Animals, the Great Ape Project, and the Nonhuman Rights Project.

REG members wear patches with the name of the organization at poker tournaments, to advertise their commitment to donate their winnings. Two REG members, Martin Jacobson and Jorryt van Hoof, were among the November Nine that played at the 2014 World Series of Poker Main Event final table. Jacobson placed first, earning him the title of poker world champion and winning $10,000,000, of which $250,000 was subsequently donated through REG.

== International coverage and reception ==
Additional coverage within the international poker community includes Bluff Europe, PokerNews, among others.
