= Thomas Cannuli =

American poker player

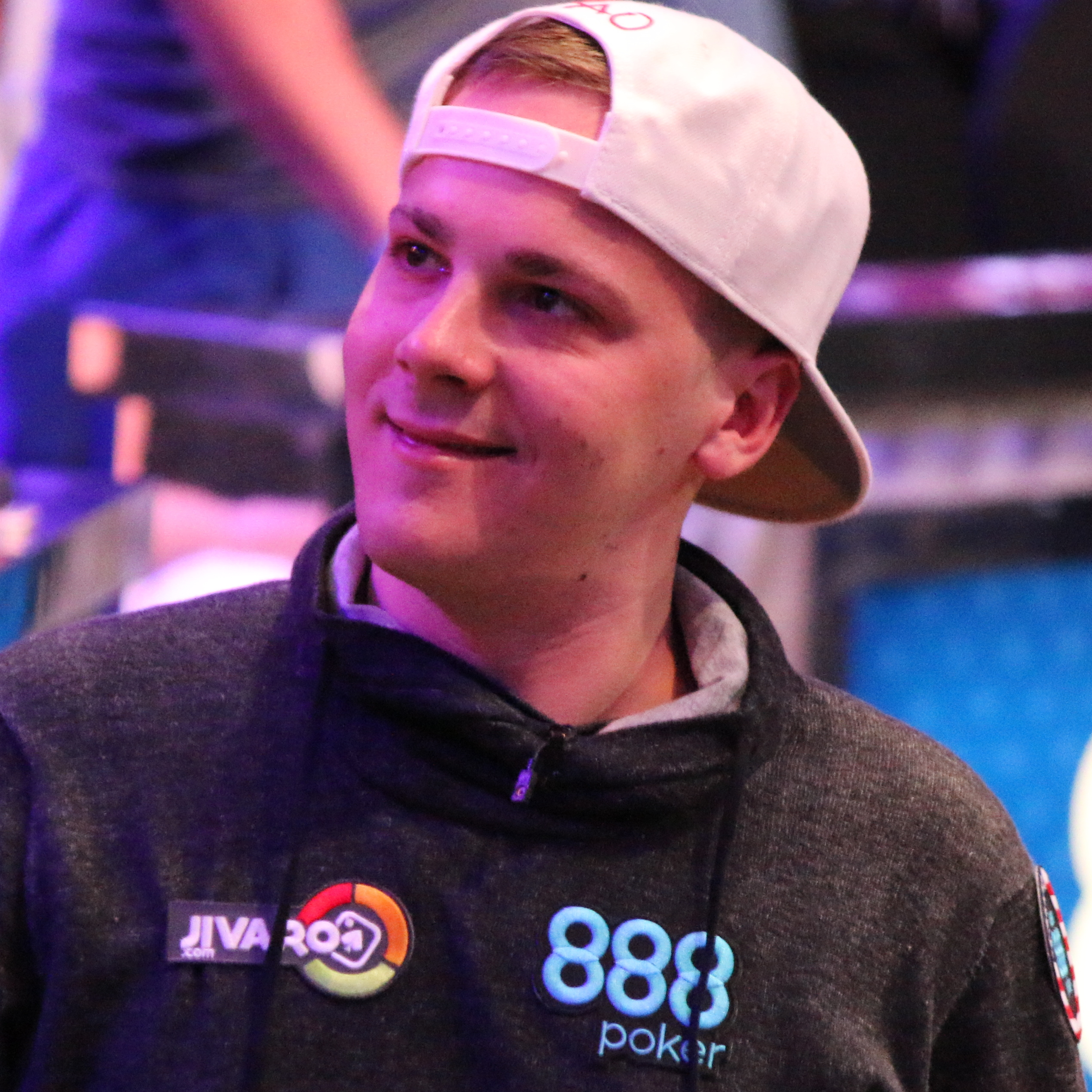
- Tom Cannuli in 2015

World Series of Poker
- Bracelet: 1
- Final tables: 2
- Money finishes: 11
- Highest WSOP Main Event finish: 6th, 2015

Thomas Cannuli is an American professional poker player, known for finishing 6th place in the 2015 WSOP Main Event for $1,426,283 and winning a WSOP bracelet in the $3,333 WSOP.com ONLINE No-Limit Hold'em High Roller.

A resident of Cape May, New Jersey, Cannuli graduated from Lower Cape May Regional High School in 2010.

== World Series of Poker ==
World Series of Poker bracelets
Year	Event	Prize money
2017	$3,333 ONLINE No Limit Hold'em	$322,815
