= 2018 World Series of Poker Europe =

Series of poker tournaments

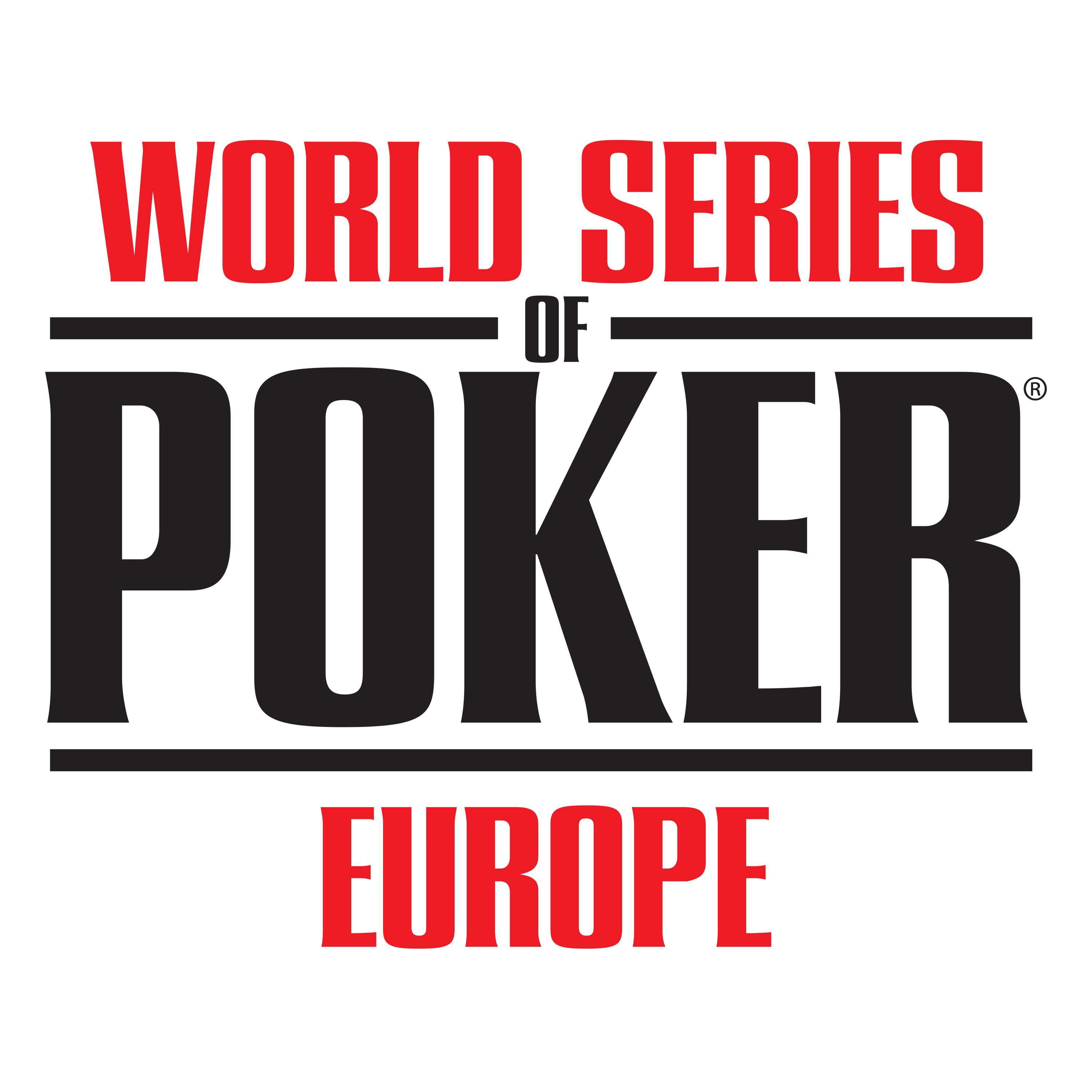
- Location: King's Casino, Rozvadov, Czech Republic
- Dates: 9 October – 2 November 2018

Champion
- (United Kingdom) Jack Sinclair

The 2018 World Series of Poker Europe (WSOPE) took place from 9 October – 2 November at King's Casino in Rozvadov, Czech Republic. There were 10 bracelet events, including a €100,000 No Limit Hold'em High Roller and the €10,350 No Limit Hold'em Main Event. The Main Event began with the first of two starting flights on 27 October, with the final table taking place on 2 November.

== Event schedule ==
#	Event	Entrants	Winner	Prize	Runner-up	Results
1	€550 Colossus	2,992	(Israel) Tamir Segal (1/1)	€203,820	(Poland) Wojciech Wyrebski	Results
2	€1,650 No Limit Hold'em 6-Handed Deepstack	221	(Israel) Asi Moshe (1/2)	€82,280	(Germany) Robert Schulz	Results
3	€550 Pot Limit Omaha 8-Handed	572	(Austria) Hanh Tran (2/2)	€59,623	(Russia) Oleg Pavlyuchuk	Results
4	€1,100 No Limit Hold'em Turbo Bounty Hunter	387	(Ukraine) Mykhailo Gutyi (1/1)	€61,000	(Germany) Florian Sarnow	Results
5	€1,100 Monster Stack	666	(Israel) Timur Margolin (2/2)	€134,407	(Chile) Raul Villarroel	Results
6	€1,650 Mixed PLO/NLHE	241	(Hungary) Norbert Szecsi (1/2)	€86,956	(United States) Shaun Deeb (2/4)	Results
7	€2,200 Pot Limit Omaha 8-Handed	187	(Hong Kong) Anson Tsang (1/1)	€91,730	(Russia) Ilya Bulychev	Results
8	€25,500 Super High Roller	133	(Australia) Michael Addamo (2/2)	€848,702	(Germany) Christian Rudolph	Results
9	€100,000 King's Super High Roller	95	(Czech Republic) Martin Kabrhel (1/2)	€2,624,340	(United States) David Peters (0/1)	Results
10	€10,350 Main Event	534	(United Kingdom) Jack Sinclair (1/1)	€1,122,239	(Hungary) Laszlo Bujtas	Results

== Player of the Year ==
Final standings as of 2 November (end of WSOPE):

Standings
Rank	Name	Points	Bracelets
1	(United States) Shaun Deeb	5,050.01	2
2	(United States) Ben Yu	3,746.04	1
3	(United States) Joe Cada	3,531.86	2
4	(United States) John Hennigan	3,440.13	1
5	(United States) Scott Bohlman	3,155.88	1
6	(Australia) Michael Addamo	3,046.88	2
7	(United States) Paul Volpe	2,863.10	1
8	(United States) Anthony Zinno	2,593.34	0
9	(United States) Eric Baldwin	2,516.30	1
10	(France) Romain Lewis	2,460.14	0

== Main Event ==
The 2018 World Series of Poker Europe Main Event began on 27 October with the first of two starting flights. The final table was reached on 1 November, with the winner being determined on 2 November. The event drew 534 entrants, generating a prize pool of €5,073,000. The top 81 players finished in the money, with the winner earning €1,122,239.

=== Final Table ===
Name	Number of chips (percentage of total)	WSOP Bracelets	WSOP Cashes*	WSOP Earnings*
(Hungary) Laszlo Bujtas	14,040,000 (26.4%)	0	4	$34,598
(Serbia) Milos Skrbic	12,720,000 (23.9%)	0	4	$35,622
(United States) Ryan Riess	10,615,000 (20.0%)	1	37	$9,094,826
(United Kingdom) Jack Sinclair	8,585,000 (16.2%)	0	9	$1,429,471
(Bulgaria) Krasimir Yankov	3,995,000 (7.5%)	0	7	$192,176
(Ukraine) Ihor Yerofieiev	3,170,000 (6.0%)	0	0	0

*-Career statistics prior to the beginning of the 2018 WSOPE Main Event

=== Final Table results ===
Place	Name	Prize
1st	Jack Sinclair (1/1)	€1,122,239
2nd	Laszlo Bujtas	€693,573
3rd	Krasimir Yankov	€480,028
4th	Ryan Riess (0/1)	€337,778
5th	Milos Skrbic	€241,718
6th	Ihor Yerofieiev	€175,965
7th	Koray Aldemir	€130,350
8th	Bulscu Lukacs	€98,287
