= Upeshka De Silva =

Sri Lankan-American poker player

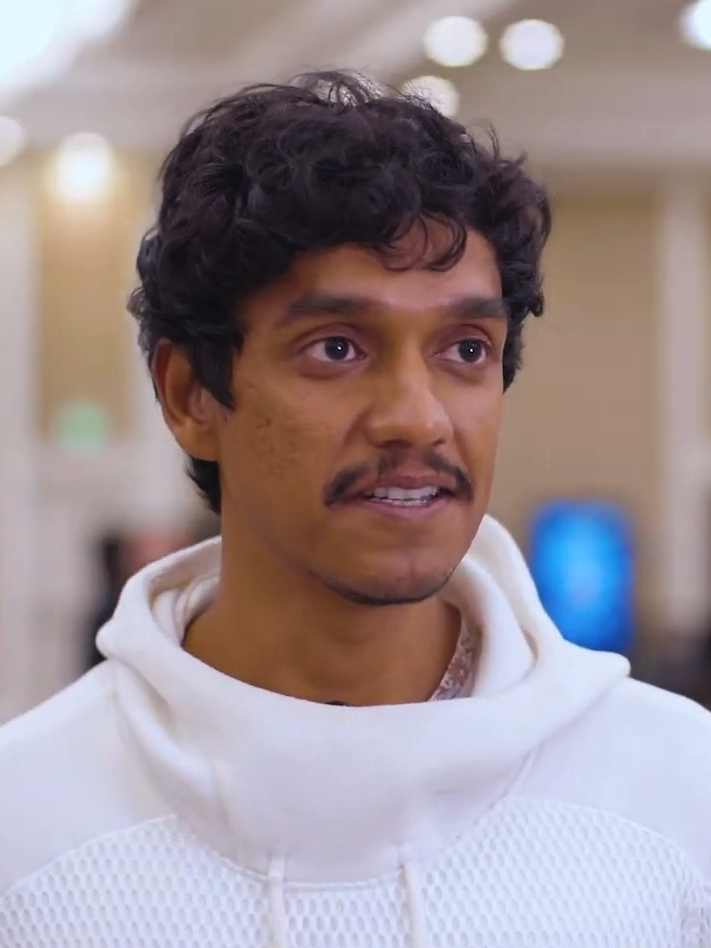
- De Silva in 2020
- Nickname: Pesh
- Born: Colombo, Sri Lanka

World Series of Poker
- Bracelets: 3
- Final tables: 5
- Money finishes: 49
- Highest WSOP Main Event finish: 17th, 2020

World Poker Tour
- Title: None
- Final tables: 3
- Money finishes: 8

European Poker Tour
- Money finish: 1

Upeshka De Silva is a Sri Lankan-American professional poker player from Katy, Texas. A three-time World Series of Poker (WSOP) bracelet winner, he made the final table of the WSOP Main Event in 2020.

De Silva was born in 1988, in Colombo, Sri Lanka, and moved to Katy in the United States when he was two years-old. He graduated from the University of Houston with degrees in history and political science.

At first, De Silva playen small home games with his high school friends. He got especially hooked on poker after the Moneymaker phenomenon and reading Doyle Brunson’s Super/System 2 book.

In 2012, he began his poker career playing private cash games in Texas. De Silva made his first WSOP final table in 2013 when he finished in seventh in the $1,500 Millionaire Maker event. In 2015, he won his first bracelet, outlasting a field of 1,655 in a $1,500 No Limit Hold'em event and earning $424,577. He also finished in 36th place in the Main Event that year. On Day 5 of the Main Event, he made a memorable call against Fedor Holz with A♥ K♣ on a board of A♦ J♦ 8♥ Q♥ 9♦ after Holz had moved all-in on the river.

De Silva's second WSOP bracelet came in a $3,000 No Limit Hold'em Shootout event in 2017. He added a third bracelet in an online event on WSOP.com in 2019. De Silva had made five WSOP final tables and cashed 49 times for $1,613,000 before the 2020 Main Event.

De Silva made the final table of the 2020 WSOP Main Event, the first portion of which was held on WSOP.com, in eighth chip position. The day before the final table, however, he tested positive for COVID-19 and was disqualified, being awarded ninth place.

De Silva has made three final tables on the World Poker Tour. In 2016, he finished in third place at the Legends of Poker, earning $198,270; he was knocked out of the tournament by Pat Lyons after losing with J♥ J♦ to Q♠ 10♥ when a queen hit on the river. He also finished in fifth at the WPT Montreal in November 2018. In March 2020, De Silva made the final table of the L.A. Poker Classic, but the tournament was delayed more than a year by the COVID-19 pandemic; he eventually finished in sixth place.

As of June 2026, De Silva has live tournament winnings of $4,122,404.

== World Series of Poker bracelets ==
Year	Tournament	Prize (US$)
2015	$1,500 No Limit Hold'em	$424,577
2017	$3,000 No Limit Hold'em Shootout	$229,923
2019	$600 WSOP.com Online Knockout Bounty	$98,263
