= Charlie Carrel =

English poker player (born 1993)

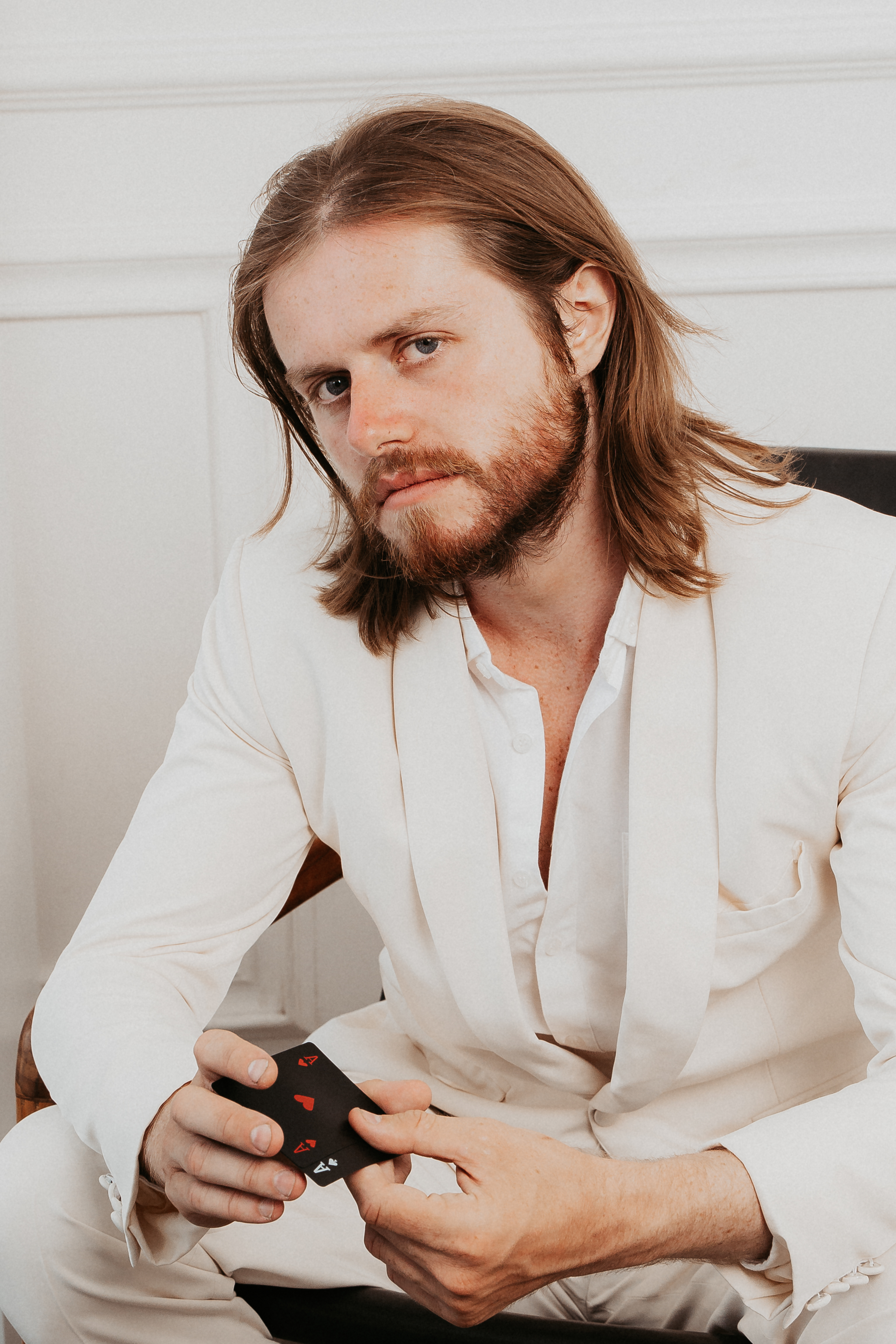
- Carrel in 2024
- Born: Charles Francis Carrel; 7 November 1993 (age 33); Saint Brelade, Jersey, Channel Islands
- Other name: Epiphany77
- Occupation: Founder of Thrive Charity UK
World Series of Poker
- Bracelet: None
- Money finishes: 8
- Highest WSOP Main Event finish: 88th, 2017
World Poker Tour
- Money finishes: 3
European Poker Tour
- Money finishes: 2

Charles Francis Carrel (born 7 November 1993) is an English professional poker player.

== Poker career ==
Carrel plays on the online poker platform PokerStars under the nickname "Epiphany77". He turned a £35 (US$50) deposit into over £3,000,000 by April 2017. In May 2015, Carrel had won over £1 million playing poker. He won the PokerStars European Tour in Monte Carlo defeating 215 other players in the high roller tournament. Earlier in the year he finished 5th in Malta tournament earning €183,800. He won a poker tournament in London in November 2014, winning £108,625 in the process.

In August 2019, Carrel won the £50,000 buy-in no-limit hold’em eight-max event at the Triton Poker Super High Roller Series London, earning $1,611,620 and 1020 POY points.

In 2020, Carrel won the WPT Online Super High Roller tournament for $600,250.

As of 2023, Carrel has a career live tournament winnings of over $9,600,000.

== Personal life ==
Carrell was born on 7 November 1993 in St. Brelade, Jersey. When he was 7 years old, his family moved to London, where he still lives.
