= 2017 World Series of Poker =

Series of poker tournaments

- Location: Rio All-Suite Hotel and Casino, Las Vegas, Nevada
- Dates: May 30 – July 17

Champion
- (United States) Scott Blumstein

The 2017 World Series of Poker was the 48th annual World Series of Poker (WSOP). It took place from May 30 – July 17 at the Rio All-Suite Hotel & Casino in Las Vegas, Nevada. There were a record 74 bracelet events including the third edition of the $565 Colossus tournament and the $10,000 No Limit Hold'em Main Event, which began on July 8.

The Main Event was streamed live on ESPN2 and Poker Central beginning on July 8 and ran throughout the tournament. For the first time since 2007, the Main Event concluded in July; for the previous nine years, once the final table was set the Main Event was stopped with the nine remaining players returning to the Rio in November to battle it out for the bracelet.

== New events ==
- Event 19: $365 The Giant No Limit Hold'em - The event will feature five starting flights spread out over five weeks, with remaining players returning for Day 2 on July 8. A player who survived one flight can choose to abandon their stack and re-enter into another flight. The money will be reached during each flight, giving a player the opportunity to cash multiple times in the event.
- Event 23: $2,620 The Marathon No Limit Hold'em - Players will begin with 26,200 chips and play 100-minute levels.
- Three WSOP.com Online Events - There will be three events offered exclusively on WSOP.com with buy-ins of $333, $1,000, and $3,333.

== Event schedule ==
Online event.

#	Event	Entrants	Winner	Prize	Runner-up	Results
1	$565 Casino Employees No Limit Hold'em	651	Bryan Hollis (1/1)	$68,817	Chris Solomon	Results
2	$10,000 Tag Team No Limit Hold'em Championship	102	Liv Boeree (1/1); Igor Kurganov (1/1)	$273,964	Joe Kuether; Ankush Mandavia (1/1)	Results
3	$3,000 No Limit Hold'em Shootout	369	Upeshka De Silva (1/2)	$229,923	Louis Helm	Results
4	$1,500 Omaha Hi-Lo 8 or Better	905	Benjamin Zamani (1/2)	$238,620	Jared Hemingway	Results
5	$565 The Colossus III No Limit Hold'em	18,054	Thomas Pomponio (1/1)	$1,000,000	Taylor Black	Results
6	$111,111 High Roller for One Drop No Limit Hold'em	130	Doug Polk (1/3)	$3,686,865	Bertrand Grospellier (0/1)	Results
7	$2,500 Mixed Triple Draw Lowball	225	Jesse Martin (1/2)	$130,948	James Obst	Results
8	$333 WSOP.com Online No Limit Hold'em	2,509	Joseph Mitchell (1/1)	$122,314	Mark Scacewater	Results
9	$10,000 Omaha Hi-Lo 8 or Better Championship	154	Abe Mosseri (1/2)	$388,795	Daniel Negreanu (0/6)	Results
10	$1,000 Tag Team No Limit Hold'em	843	Nipun Java (1/1); Aditya Sushant (1/1)	$150,637	David Guay; Pablo Mariz	Results
11	$1,500 Dealers Choice Six-Handed	364	David Bach (1/2)	$119,399	Kevin Iacofano	Results
12	$1,500 No Limit Hold'em	1,739	David Pham (1/3)	$391,960	Jordan Young	Results
13	$1,500 No Limit 2-7 Lowball Draw	266	Frank Kassela (1/3)	$89,151	Bernard Lee	Results
14	$1,500 H.O.R.S.E.	736	David Singer (1/2)	$203,709	Kevin LaMonica	Results
15	$10,000 Heads Up No Limit Hold'em Championship	129	Adrián Mateos (1/3)	$336,656	John Smith	Results
16	$1,500 No Limit Hold'em Six-Handed	1,748	Anthony Marquez (1/1)	$393,273	Demosthenes Kiriopoulos	Results
17	$10,000 Dealers Choice Six-Handed Championship	102	John Racener (1/1)	$273,962	Viacheslav Zhukov (0/2)	Results
18	$565 Pot Limit Omaha	3,186	Tyler Smith (1/1)	$224,344	Jason Stockfish	Results
19	$365 The Giant No Limit Hold'em	10,015	Dieter Dechant (1/1)	$291,240	Hrair Yapoudjian	Results
20	$1,500 No Limit Hold'em Millionaire Maker	7,761	Pablo Mariz (1/1)	$1,221,407	Dejuante Alexander	Results
21	$1,500 Eight-Game Mix Six-Handed	472	Ron Ware (1/1)	$145,577	Mike Ross	Results
22	$10,000 No Limit 2-7 Lowball Draw Championship	92	John Monnette (1/3)	$256,610	Per Hildebrand	Results
23	$2,620 The Marathon No Limit Hold'em	1,759	Joseph Di Rosa Rojas (1/1)	$690,469	Alexander Lynskey	Results
24	$1,500 Limit Hold'em	616	Shane Buchwald (1/1)	$177,985	Sandy Tayi	Results
25	$1,000 Pot Limit Omaha	1,058	Tyler Groth (1/1)	$179,126	Jonathan Zarin	Results
26	$10,000 Razz Championship	97	James Obst (1/1)	$265,138	Eric Kurtzman	Results
27	$3,000 No Limit Hold'em Six-Handed	959	Chris Moorman (1/1)	$498,682	Bernardo Dias	Results
28	$1,500 Limit 2-7 Lowball Triple Draw	326	Brian Brubaker (1/1)	$109,967	Brendan Taylor (0/1)	Results
29	$2,500 No Limit Hold'em	1,086	Gaurav Raina (1/1)	$456,822	James Calvo	Results
30	$10,000 H.O.R.S.E. Championship	150	David Bach (2/3)	$383,208	Eric Rodawig (0/1)	Results
31	$1,000 Seniors No Limit Hold'em Championship	5,389	Frank Maggio (1/1)	$617,303	William Murray	Results
32	$1,500 Omaha Hi-Lo 8 or Better Mix	688	Vladimir Shchemelev (1/2)	$194,323	Howard Smith	Results
33	$1,500 No Limit Hold'em	1,698	Christopher Frank (1/1)	$384,833	Ryan Leng	Results
34	$10,000 Limit 2-7 Lowball Triple Draw Championship	80	Ben Yu (1/2)	$232,738	Shaun Deeb (0/2)	Results
35	$1,000 Super Seniors No Limit Hold'em	1,720	James Moore (1/2)	$259,230	Kerry Goldberg	Results
36	$5,000 No Limit Hold'em Six-Handed	574	Nadar Kakhmazov (1/1)	$580,338	Chris Hunichen	Results
37	$1,000 No Limit Hold'em	2,020	Thomas Reynolds (1/1)	$292,880	James Hughes	Results
38	$10,000 Limit Hold'em Championship	120	Joe McKeehen (1/2)	$311,817	Jared Talarico	Results
39	$1,000 No Limit Hold'em Super Turbo Bounty	1,868	Rifat Palevic (1/1)	$183,903	Ryan Olisar	Results
40	$1,500 Seven Card Stud Hi-Lo 8 or Better	595	Ernest Bohn (1/1)	$173,228	William Kohler	Results
41	$1,500 Pot Limit Omaha	870	Loren Klein (1/2)	$231,483	Chun Law	Results
42	$10,000 No Limit Hold'em Six-Handed Championship	332	Dmitry Yurasov (1/1)	$775,923	Tommy Chen	Results
43	$1,500 No Limit Hold'em Shootout	1,025	Ben Maya (1/1)	$257,764	Thomas Boivin	Results
44	$3,000 H.O.R.S.E.	399	Matthew Schreiber (1/1)	$256,226	Phil Hui (0/1)	Results
45	$5,000 No Limit Hold'em	505	Christopher Brammer (1/1)	$527,555	Jett Schencker	Results
46	$1,500 Pot Limit Omaha Hi-Lo 8 or Better	830	Nathan Gamble (1/1)	$223,339	Adam Hendrix	Results
47	$1,500 No Limit Hold'em Monster Stack	6,716	Brian Yoon (1/3)	$1,094,349	Ihar Soika	Results
48	$10,000 Seven Card Stud Hi-Lo 8 or Better Championship	125	Christopher Vitch (1/2)	$320,103	Benny Glaser (0/3)	Results
49	$3,000 Pot Limit Omaha Six-Handed	630	Luis Calvo (1/1)	$362,185	Rudolph Sawa	Results
50	$1,500 No Limit Hold'em Bounty	1,927	Chris Bolek (1/1)	$266,646	Bryan Emory	Results
51	$10,000 Pot Limit Omaha Hi-Lo 8 or Better Championship	207	Bryce Yockey (1/1)	$511,147	Jeremy Joseph	Results
52	$1,500 No Limit Hold'em	1,580	Mohsin Charania (1/1)	$364,438	Cary Katz	Results
53	$3,000 Limit Hold'em Six-Handed	256	Max Silver (1/1)	$172,645	Guowei Zhang	Results
54	$10,000 Pot Limit Omaha Eight-Handed Championship	428	Tommy Le (1/1)	$938,732	Chris Lee (0/1)	Results
55	$1,500 Seven Card Stud	298	Tom Koral (1/1)	$96,907	Tsong Lin	Results
56	$5,000 No Limit Hold'em	623	Andres Korn (1/1)	$618,285	Pete Chen	Results
57	$2,500 Omaha Hi-Lo 8 or Better/Seven Card Stud Hi-Lo 8 or Better Mix	405	Smith Sirisakorn (1/1)	$215,902	Jameson Painter	Results
58	$1,500 No Limit Hold'em	1,763	Artur Rudziankov (1/1)	$395,918	Mario Prats	Results
59	$2,500 Big Bet Mix	197	Jens Lakemeier (1/1)	$112,232	Jason Stockfish	Results
60	$888 Crazy Eights No Limit Hold'em Eight-Handed	8,120	Alexandru Papazian (1/1)	$888,888	Kilian Kramer	Results
61	$3,333 WSOP.com Online No Limit Hold'em High Roller	424	Thomas Cannuli (1/1)	$322,815	Tara Cain	Results
62	$50,000 Poker Players Championship	100	Elior Sion (1/1)	$1,395,767	Johannes Becker	Results
63	$1,000 No Limit Hold'em	1,750	Rulah Divine (1/1)	$262,501	Patrick Truong	Results
64	$1,500 No Limit Hold'em/Pot Limit Omaha Eight-Handed Mix	1,058	Sebastian Langrock (1/1)	$268,555	Ryan Laplante (0/1)	Results
65	$1,000 No Limit Hold'em	1,413	Shai Zurr (1/1)	$223,241	Ognjen Sekularac	Results
66	$1,500 No Limit Hold'em	1,956	Chris Klodnicki (1/1)	$428,423	Emile Schiff	Results
67	$25,000 Pot Limit Omaha Eight-Handed High Roller	205	James Calderaro (1/1)	$1,289,074	Alexey Rybin	Results
68	$3,000 No Limit Hold'em	1,349	Harrison Gimbel (1/1)	$645,922	Chance Kornuth (0/1)	Results
69	$1,500 Razz	419	Jason Gola (1/1)	$132,957	David Baker (0/1)	Results
70	$10,000/$1,000 Ladies No Limit Hold'em Championship	718	Heidi May (1/1)	$135,098	Deborah Worley-Roberts	Results
71	$1,000 WSOP.com Online No Limit Hold'em Championship	1,312	Nipun Java (2/2)	$237,688	Jason James	Results
72	$10,000 Seven Card Stud Championship	88	Mike Wattel (1/2)	$245,451	Chris Ferguson (0/5)	Results
73	$10,000 No Limit Hold'em Main Event	7,221	Scott Blumstein (1/1)	$8,150,000	Dan Ott	Results
74	$1,000 The Little One for One Drop No Limit Hold'em	4,391	Adrian Moreno (1/1)	$528,316	Martin Lesjoe	Results

== Player of the Year ==
Final standings as of November 10 (end of WSOPE):

Standings
Rank	Name	Points	Bracelets
1	(United States) Chris Ferguson	1,178.53	1
2	(United States) John Racener	1,042.04	1
3	(United States) Ryan Hughes	994.35	0
4	(Canada) Mike Leah	910.01	0
5	(United States) John Monnette	865.2	1
6	(Belgium) Kenny Hallaert	838.35	0
7	(United States) Alex Foxen	833.45	0
8	(Italy) Dario Sammartino	775.89	0
9	(United States) Ray Henson	768.49	0
10	(United States) Ben Yu	766.49	1

== Main Event ==
The $10,000 No Limit Hold'em Main Event began on July 8 with the first of three starting flights. The final table was reached on July 17. In a change from the November Nine, the finalists returned on July 20 with the winner being determined on July 22.

The Main Event drew 7,221 players, the largest field since 2010. The top 1,084 players finished in the money. Each player at the final table earned $1,000,000, with the winner earning $8,150,000.

=== Performance of past champions ===
Name	Championship Year(s)	Day of Elimination
Tom McEvoy	1983	3
Johnny Chan	1987, 1988	3
Phil Hellmuth	1989	2C
Scotty Nguyen	1998	4 (549th)*
Chris Ferguson	2000	2C
Carlos Mortensen	2001	4 (984th)*
Robert Varkonyi	2002	2AB
Chris Moneymaker	2003	1B
Greg Raymer	2004	3
Joe Hachem	2005	3
Jamie Gold	2006	1B
Jerry Yang	2007	1A
Joe Cada	2009	4 (948th)*
Jonathan Duhamel	2010	2AB
Greg Merson	2012	1B
Ryan Riess	2013	2C
Martin Jacobson	2014	2AB
Joe McKeehen	2015	2C
Qui Nguyen	2016	2AB

* Indicates the place of a player who finished in the money

=== Other notable high finishes ===
NB: This list is restricted to top 100 finishers with an existing Wikipedia entry.

Place	Name	Prize
23rd	Marcel Lüske	$263,532
43rd	Dario Sammartino	$176,399
73rd	Ian Johns	$85,482

=== Final Table ===
Antoine Saout and Ben Lamb both made the Main Event final table for the second time, having finished 3rd in 2009 and 2011, respectively. Michael Ruane, 4th-place finisher in 2016, was knocked out on the final table bubble in 10th place to just miss making it for the second straight year. Damian Salas would go on to win the Main Event in 2020.

Name	Number of chips (percentage of total)	WSOP Bracelets	WSOP Cashes*	WSOP Earnings*
(United States) Scott Blumstein	97,250,000 (27.0%)	0	0	0
(United Kingdom) John Hesp	85,700,000 (23.8%)	0	0	0
(France) Benjamin Pollak	35,175,000 (9.8%)	0	16	$532,038
(United States) Bryan Piccioli	33,800,000 (9.4%)	1	27	$552,208
(United States) Dan Ott	26,475,000 (7.3%)	0	2	$3,656
(Argentina) Damian Salas	22,175,000 (6.1%)	0	13	$177,983
(France) Antoine Saout	21,750,000 (6.0%)	0	13	$3,999,582
(United Kingdom) Jack Sinclair	20,200,000 (5.6%)	0	2	$4,088
(United States) Ben Lamb	18,050,000 (5.0%)	1	14	$6,209,724

*Career statistics prior to the beginning of the 2017 Main Event.

=== Final Table results ===
Place	Name	Prize
1st	Scott Blumstein	$8,150,000
2nd	Dan Ott	$4,700,000
3rd	Benjamin Pollak	$3,500,000
4th	John Hesp	$2,600,000
5th	Antoine Saout	$2,000,000
6th	Bryan Piccioli	$1,675,000
7th	Damian Salas	$1,425,000
8th	Jack Sinclair	$1,200,000
9th	Ben Lamb	$1,000,000
