= David Bach (poker player) =

American poker player

World Series of Poker
- Bracelets: 3
- Final tables: 23
- Money finishes: 79
- Highest WSOP Main Event finish: 45th, 2011

World Poker Tour
- Title: None
- Final table: 1
- Money finishes: 2

David Bach is a professional poker player, and the winner of the $50,000 World Championship H.O.R.S.E. event at the 2009 World Series of Poker. Bach defeated John Hanson heads-up after a record breaking marathon final table that lasted 20 hours and 492 hands.

At the 2017 WSOP Bach won two more bracelets in mixed events. First he won the $1,500 Dealers Choice event, and later added the $10,000 H.O.R.S.E. Championship.

As of 2025, in his WSOP career, Bach has 79 cashes, including 23 final tables. He has previously finished runner-up in five WSOP bracelet events. As of 2025, Bach's total live tournament winnings exceed $4,500,000.

Bach has won three major online tournament titles, constituting the Triple Crown.

Bach studied psychology at the University of Georgia.

== World Series of Poker Bracelets ==
Year	Tournament	Prize (US$)
2009	$50,000 World Championship H.O.R.S.E.	$1,276,802
2017	$1,500 Dealers Choice 6-Handed	$119,399
2017	$10,000 H.O.R.S.E. Championship	$383,208
