= James Obst =

Australian poker player (born 1990)

- Nickname: Andy McLEOD
- Born: 3 August 1990 (age 36)

World Series of Poker
- Bracelets: 2
- Final tables: 7
- Money finishes: 30
- Highest WSOP Main Event finish: 13th, 2016

European Poker Tour
- Money finish: 1

James Obst (born 3 August 1990) is a poker player from Adelaide, Australia, and a World Series of Poker bracelet winner. He attended St Peter's College in Adelaide.

== Career ==
Obst was an accomplished junior chess player, representing Australia three times at the World Junior Chess Championship. He began playing poker at the age of 14. He started with no-limit hold 'em in 2/4 cents and then tried Stud Hi-Lo.

Under the name "Andy McLEOD" (a nod to former Adelaide Crows footballer Andrew McLeod), Obst has won four Spring Championship of Online Poker titles, a World Championship of Online Poker title, and one Full Tilt Online Poker Series tournament. By the age of 19, he had already won more than $1.5 million online.

Obst's first recorded live tournament cash came in 2009. At the WSOP, he has cashed 44 times and made 16 top-10 finishes. After twice finishing runner-up, Obst won his first bracelet in 2017 in the $10,000 Razz Championship, earning $265,000. His largest cash came from a 13th-place finish at the WSOP Main Event in 2016 for $427,930. In the 2024 WSOP, he won his second bracelet in the $10,000 Seven Card Stud Championship event.

As of June 2023, Obst's live earnings exceed US$3,137,000. His 44 WSOP cashes account for more than $2.2 million of those winnings.

== World Series of Poker bracelets ==
| Year | Tournament | Prize ($US) |
|---|---|---|
| 2017 | $10,000 Razz Championship | $265,138 |
| 2024 | $10,000 Seven Card Stud Championship | $260,658 |

== Personal life ==
In his free time, Obst still plays chess, and he enjoys tennis and golf.
