= Damian Salas =

Argentine poker player (born 1975)

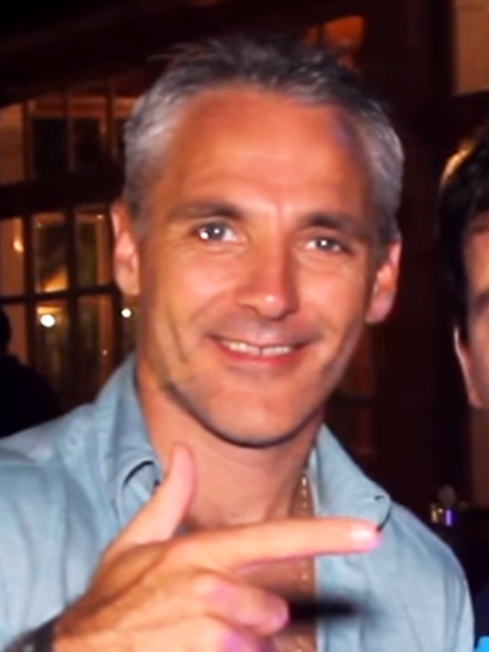
- Salas at 2018 WPT Argentina
- Nickname: Pampa

World Series of Poker
- Bracelet: 1
- Final tables: 4
- Money finishes: 31
- Highest WSOP Main Event finish: Winner, 2020

Damian Andres Salas (born 1975) is an Argentine professional poker player from Chascomús. He won the World Series of Poker Main Event in 2020, becoming the first person from Argentina to win the world championship of poker and the second person from South America to win the championship, after 2001 champion Carlos Mortensen. He made the Main Event final table in 2017, where he finished in 7th place earning $1,425,000.

Salas is a lawyer in Argentina, and got his degree from the National University of La Plata. He first cashed in a WSOP event in 2009. In 2016, he made the final table of a $1,500 No Limit Hold'em Shootout event, finishing in fifth place for $64,000.

Salas finished in the money of the Main Event in both 2013 (606th) and 2016 (418th). In 2017, he made the final table in sixth chip position before finishing in seventh place, being eliminated with A♣ 10♥ against the pocket fours of Dan Ott which made a straight on the river. Salas earned $1,425,000. He also cashed in the 2018 Main Event in 569th place.

In 2020, Salas again made the Main Event final table in the GGPoker portion of the tournament. At the live final table in Rozvadov, Czech Republic, he defeated Brazil's Brunno Botteon heads-up holding K♦ 8♥ which made two pair on the river. For the win, he earned $1,550,969.

On January 3, Salas played Joseph Hebert, champion of the American portion of the Main Event, in the heads-up championship match at the Rio All-Suite Hotel and Casino in Las Vegas. On the 173rd hand of play, Salas made a full house with K♦ J♠ to beat the A♦ Q♠ of Hebert to win the Main Event and earn an additional $1 million.

Playing under the name "pampa27," Salas has more than $9 million in online winnings. In November 2020, he won a $1,050 No Limit Hold'em event during the European Poker Tour Online. He won a $10,300 No Limit Hold'em SCOOP event on PokerStars in April 2021, earning $263,000.

As of 2021, Salas' live tournament winnings are $5,239,000. His 31 WSOP cashes account for $4,261,000 of those winnings.

== World Series of Poker bracelets ==
Year	Tournament	Prize (US$)
2020	$10,000 No Limit Hold'em Main Event	$2,550,969
