= Antoine Saout =

French poker player

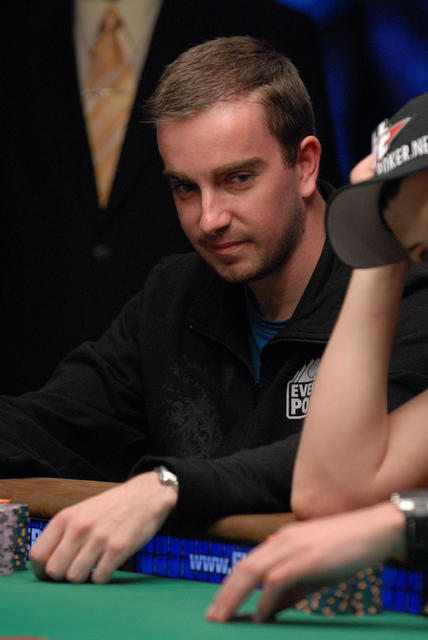
- Saout at the 2009 World Series of Poker
- Nickname: tonio292
- Born: 26 June 1984 (age 42) (France) Morlaix

World Series of Poker
- Bracelet: none
- Final tables: 3
- Money finishes: 13
- Highest WSOP Main Event finish: 3rd, 2009

World Poker Tour
- Title: none
- Final table: 1
- Money finishes: 5

European Poker Tour
- Title: none
- Final table: none
- Money finishes: 5

Antoine Saout (born 26 June 1984) is a French professional poker player who made the November Nine in the 2009 World Series of Poker Main Event, finishing in third place.

In April 2007, Antoine Saout began playing poker online under the pseudonym "tonio292" while studying at the National School of Information Technology. He turned full-time professional a year and a half later. In late 2008, Saout switched his focus to live poker qualifying for several tournaments including the World Series of Poker through Everest Poker.

In July 2009, Saout reached the final table in the 2009 World Series of Poker Main Event. Three months later, he finished 7th for £114,228 in the WSOPE Main Event and then finished 3rd in the 2009 WSOP Main Event, winning an additional $3,479,485 in the process. With three players remaining he called Joe Cada's short stack all in with Q♠ Q♥ against Cada's 2♠ 2♣. The board came 7♠ 2♦ 9♠ 3♥ 6♠ giving Cada three of a kind and leaving Saout with a short chip stack. Saout was later eliminated after moving all in for his remain stack with 8♠ 8♥ again against Cada who held A♦ K♠. Cada hit a king on the river card to eliminate Saout.

In 2016, Saout made another deep run in the Main Event, finishing 25th for $269,430.

In 2017, Saout was part of the final nine, making his second WSOP Main Event final table. He finished in fifth place, earning $2,000,000.

As of 2017, Anoine Saout's live tournament winnings exceed $7,550,000. This ranks Saout third on France's all time money list.
