= John Monnette =

American poker player (born 1982)

- Nicknames: Angry John, jmonnett (PokerStars)
- Born: February 16, 1982 (age 44); Palmdale, California, U.S.

World Series of Poker
- Bracelets: 5
- Final tables: 26
- Money finishes: 93
- Highest WSOP Main Event finish: 155th, 2009

World Poker Tour
- Title: None
- Final table: None
- Money finishes: 6

John Edward Monnette (born February 16, 1982) is an American mixed-game specialist professional poker player from Palmdale, California and is a five-time World Series of Poker bracelet winner.

== World Series of Poker ==
At the 2011 World Series of Poker (WSOP), Monnette won the $2,500 8-Game Mix event earning $278,144, defeating bracelet winner and 2009 Main Event November Nine fourth-place finisher Eric Buchman during heads-up play. The following year at the 2012 World Series of Poker, he won his second bracelet in the $5,000 Seven Card Stud event, earning $190,826. Also, at the 2012 WSOP, Monnette finished runner-up to bracelet winner David "Bakes" Baker in the $10,000 H.O.R.S.E. for $279,206.

Monnette won his third WSOP bracelet at the 2017 World Series of Poker when he won the $10,000 No-Limit 2-7 Lowball Draw Championship for $256,610.

At the 2021 World Series of Poker, Monnette won his fourth WSOP bracelet when he won the $10,000 Limit Hold'em Championship for $245,680. In the 2023 WSOP, he won his fifth bracelet in the $1,500 Limit 2-7 Lowball Triple Draw event for $145,863.

As of 2023, his total live tournament winnings exceed $4,100,000.

== World Series of Poker bracelets ==
Year	Event	Prize Money
2011	$2,500 Eight Game Mix	$278,144
2012	$5,000 Seven Card Stud	$190,826
2017	$10,000 No Limit 2-7 Lowball Draw Championship	$256,610
2021	$10,000 Limit Hold'em Championship	$245,680
2023	$1,500 Limit 2-7 Lowball Triple Draw	$145,863

== Online poker ==
Prior to Black Friday 2011, Monnette played at the online poker site PokerStars under the screen name jmonnett. Among his accomplishments were one World Championship of Online Poker (WCOOP) title in 2010's Event 27, the $320 Fixed-Limit Badugi, earning $19,250. Monnette also holds a title from the 2010 Spring Championship of Online Poker (SCOOP) in Event 24 (High), a $1,050 buy-in 2-7 Triple Draw tournament that earned him $36,400.

== Personal life ==
Monnette was born in Palmdale, California, and graduated from University of California, San Diego. Monnette married Diana Cox in 2016, and the couple has a daughter born in September 2019, and a son born in 2021.
