= Ryan Hughes (poker player) =

American poker player (born 1981)

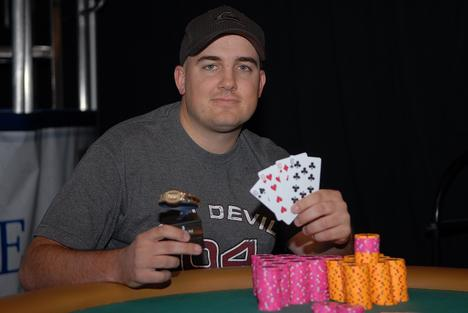
- Hughes after winning his first bracelet in the 2007 World Series of Poker
- Born: 1981 (age 44–45)

World Series of Poker
- Bracelets: 3
- Money finishes: 9
- Highest WSOP Main Event finish: 404th, 2005

Ryan Hughes (born 1981) is a poker player who won a World Series of Poker bracelet at the 2007 World Series of Poker in the $2,000 Seven-Card Stud Hi-Low Split-8 or Better event and the 2008 World Series of Poker $1,500 Seven-Card Stud Hi-Low Split-8 or Better event. In February 2007, Hughes won the Professional Poker Tour event at the L.A. Poker Classic. In 2023, he won a bracelet in the $1,000 No Limit Hold'em - Deepstack Online Bracelet Event.

As of 2023, Hughes has tournament winnings of over $3,100,000. His nine cashes at the WSOP account for $461,319 of those winnings.

== World Series of Poker bracelets ==
Year	Tournament	Prize (US$)
2007	$2,000 Seven-Card Stud Hi-Low Split-8 or Better	$176,358
2008	$1,500 Seven Card Stud Hi-Low Split-8 or Better	$183,368
2023	$1,000 No-Limit Hold'em Deepstack Online	$145,059
