= Scott Blumstein =

American poker player (born 1992)

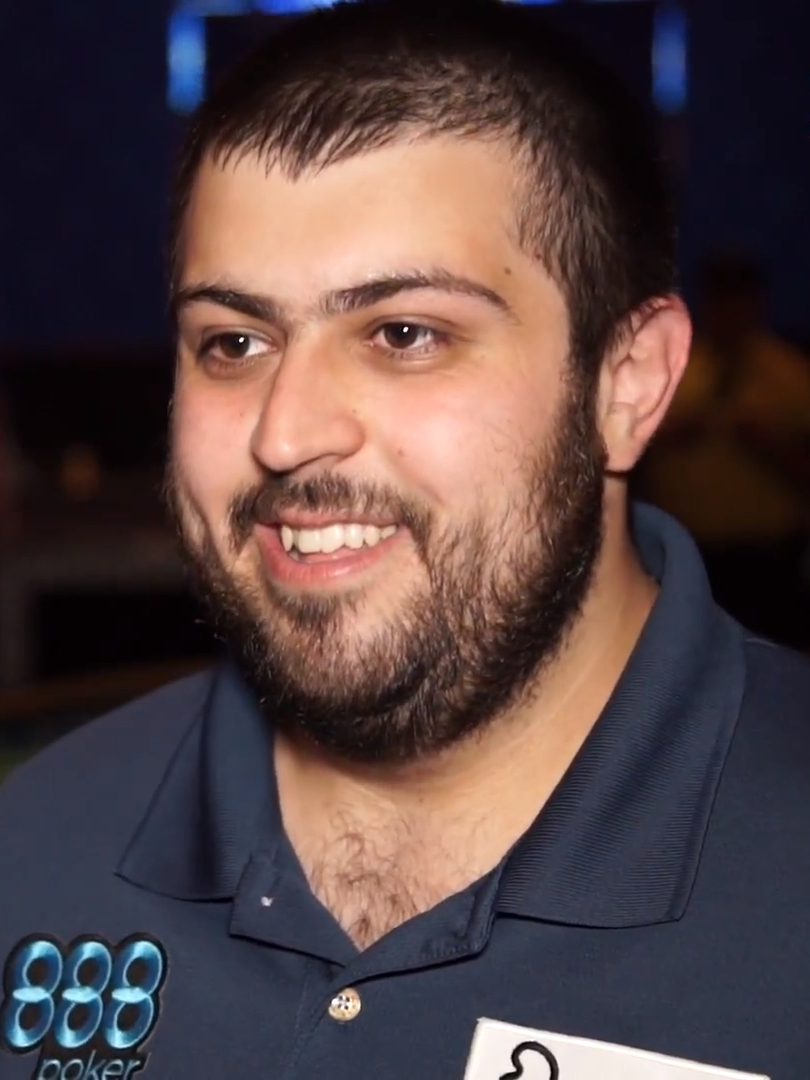
- Blumstein in 2017
- Born: March 27, 1992 (age 34)

World Series of Poker
- Bracelet: 1
- Final table: 1
- Money finishes: 2
- Highest WSOP Main Event finish: Winner, 2017

Scott Blumstein (born March 27, 1992) is an American poker player from Morristown, New Jersey. In 2017, he won the World Series of Poker Main Event for $8,150,000.

Blumstein graduated from Temple University with an accounting degree before becoming a professional poker player. Prior to the Main Event, his largest career cash came in a preliminary event at the Borgata Summer Poker Open in July 2016, where he earned $199,854. He also has three cashes on the WSOP Circuit. Online, he has nearly $150,000 in total career winnings.

At the 2017 Main Event, Blumstein prevailed over a field of 7,221 players, the third-largest in history at the time. He entered the final table as chip leader and defeated Dan Ott on the 246th hand and 65th of heads-up play when his A♥ 2♦ overcame Ott's A♦ 8♦ with a deuce on the river.

As of 2024, Blumstein's career tournament winnings exceed $8,600,000.

== World Series of Poker bracelets ==
Year	Tournament	Prize (US$)
2017	$10,000 No Limit Hold'em Main Event	$8,150,000
