= Igor Kurganov =

Russian-born German poker player (born 1988)

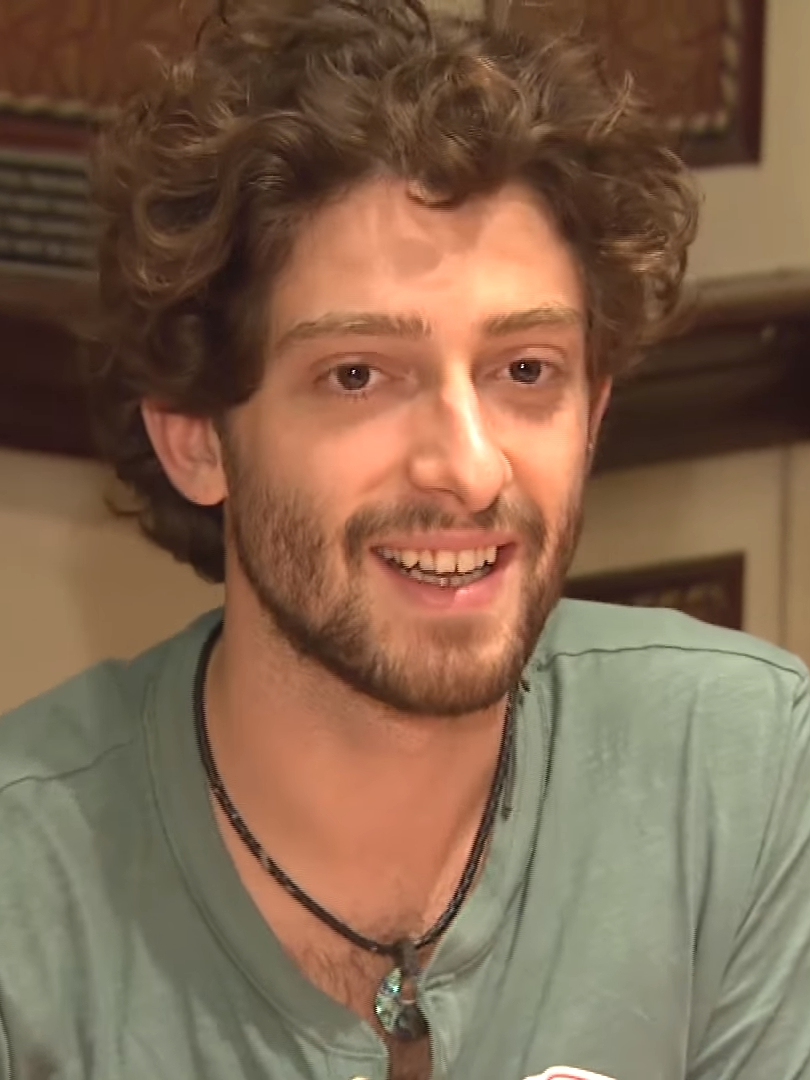
- Igor Kurganov in 2015
- Nickname: lechuckpoker
- Born: 5 May 1988 (age 38); Saint Petersburg

World Series of Poker
- Bracelet: 1
- Final table: 1
- Money finishes: 7

World Poker Tour
- Money finishes: 3

European Poker Tour
- Money finishes: 4
- Spouse: Liv Boeree (m. 2025)

Igor Kurganov (born 5 May 1988) is a Russian born German professional poker player, angel investor, and philanthropist. He is the co-founder of Raising for Effective Giving, a philanthropic organisation that promotes a rational model to philanthropy often referred to as effective altruism, and provides advice on choosing charities based on certain criteria.

== Poker career ==
Kurganov's first tournament was the 2010 PokerStars Caribbean Adventure where he finished in 119th place for $20,000. In April 2012, he won the EPT High Roller in Monte Carlo for $1,425,874. He made three final tables in the 2013 Aussie Millions cashing for over $1,000,000. Kurganov finished 6th in GuangDong Asia Millions cashing for over $1,000,000 and later in the year played his first World Series of Poker event winning an additional $70,000.

Kurganov plays online under the nickname lechuckpoker.

In April 2016, he teamed with the London Royals in the Global Poker League. As of 2020, Kurganov's live tournament winnings exceed $18,500,000.

In November 2019, Igor Kurganov announced on Twitter, that he has left Team Pokerstars.

=== World Series of Poker bracelets ===
| Year | Event | Prize Money |
|---|---|---|
| 2017 | $10,000 Tag Team No Limit Hold'em Championship | $273,964 |

== Personal life ==
Kurganov was born in St. Petersburg and immigrated with his family to Germany at an early age. Kurganov has been dating British poker player Liv Boeree since 2014; the couple married at the Burning Man festival in 2025. Together they founded the charity project Raising for Effective Giving, an organization that educates poker players about effective altruism, and fundraises for specifically selected highly effective charities. As of July 2020, Raising for Effective Giving has raised over $14,000,000 for its supported charities. Kurganov himself expressed particular interest in supporting organizations that work on existential risk research. Kurganov lived for a time in Munich and then London and most recently was reported to have moved to Austin, Texas.

== Association with Elon Musk ==
A Wall Street Journal article in July 2022 details some of Kurganov's connection to Elon Musk. Kurganov did charity coordination work with Musk for a period in 2021–2022.
