= Jack Sinclair (poker player) =

English poker player (born 1990)

- Born: 1990 (age 35–36)

World Series of Poker
- Bracelet: 1
- Final tables: 2
- Money finishes: 10
- Highest WSOP Main Event finish: 8th, 2017

European Poker Tour
- Money finishes: 3

Jack Sinclair is an English professional poker player from London, England, and the 2018 World Series of Poker Europe Main Event champion.

Sinclair's first live tournament cash came in April 2017 at a Party Poker Millions event in Nottingham. That summer he cashed twice in World Series of Poker events before making the final table of the Main Event, finishing in eighth place for $1,200,000.

At the 2018 WSOPE in Rozvadov, Czech Republic, Sinclair defeated Laszlo Bujtas heads-up, his Q♥ 9♣ prevailing over the J♦ 7♠ of Bujtas. Sinclair earned €1,122,239 for the victory and his first WSOP bracelet.

Sinclair worked as a sound engineer before his poker career. His father, David, is a musician and journalist for The Times.

As of November 2018, Sinclair's total live winnings exceed $3,393,000. His 10 WSOP cashes account for $2,705,000 of those winnings.

== World Series of Poker bracelets ==
Year	Tournament	Prize
2018E	€10,000 No Limit Hold'em Main Event	€1,122,239

An "E" following a year denotes bracelet(s) won at the World Series of Poker Europe
