= Joe Kuether =

American poker player (born 1988)

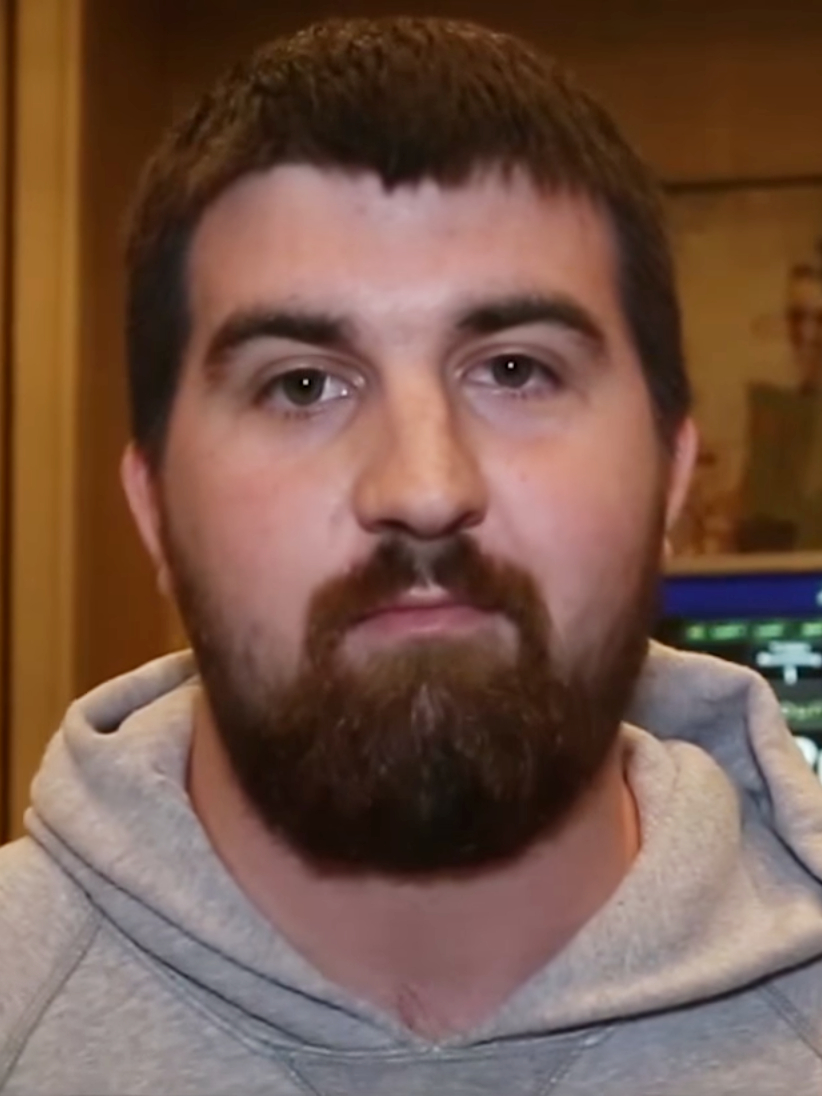
- Joe Kuether at 2015 WPT Borgata Championship
- Nicknames: daPHUNNIEman, DAP
- Born: February 5, 1988 (age 38); Elm Grove, Wisconsin, United States

World Series of Poker
- Bracelet: None
- Final tables: 2
- Money finishes: 25

World Poker Tour
- Title: None
- Final tables: 2
- Money finishes: 13

Joseph "Joe" Kuether (/kiːθər/; born February 5, 1988), known as "The Luckbox", is an American professional poker player. He was ranked 22nd in the 2014 Poker Player of the year rankings, and has lifetime live earnings of over $3,600,000.

== Personal life ==
Kuether grew up in Elm Grove, Wisconsin. He attended Brookfield East High School and graduated with a degree in accounting from University of Wisconsin–Madison.

== Poker career ==
=== Online poker ===
Kuether began playing poker with his friends in high school, moved to online poker, and quickly began taking it more seriously. Joe learned the intricacies of poker through trial and error, steadily growing a bankroll while playing throughout college. Joe has long played under the poker alias, daPHUNNIEman and has amassed a lifetime total of $976,501 while playing online.

=== Tournament poker ===
Kuether is a cash game player. After a few years of playing live, Kuether appeared on the tournament poker scene in 2011, after Poker black friday shut down the online poker world. Joe has built a name for himself as a consistent players on the poker circuit.

As of 2023, his total live tournament winnings exceed $7,500,000.

==== Top finishes ====
Joe's first 7 figure in-the-money finish happened on December 1, 2015, at the PokerStars Caribbean Adventure High Roller event. He finished 2nd place and took home $1,050,000.

Highest Tournament Cashes
Year	Tournament	Prize
2015	PCA High Roller - Single Re-Entry - Eight-Handed	$1,050,000
2014	Seminole Hard Rock Poker Open Championship ($10,000,000 Guaranteed)	$424,044
2013	Arizona State Poker Championship Main Event	$424,044
2015	WPT Borgata Poker Open	$262,994
2008	Bay 101 Shooting Star Classic Main Event	$246,161
