= Liv Boeree =

British poker player, television presenter, speaker, and writer

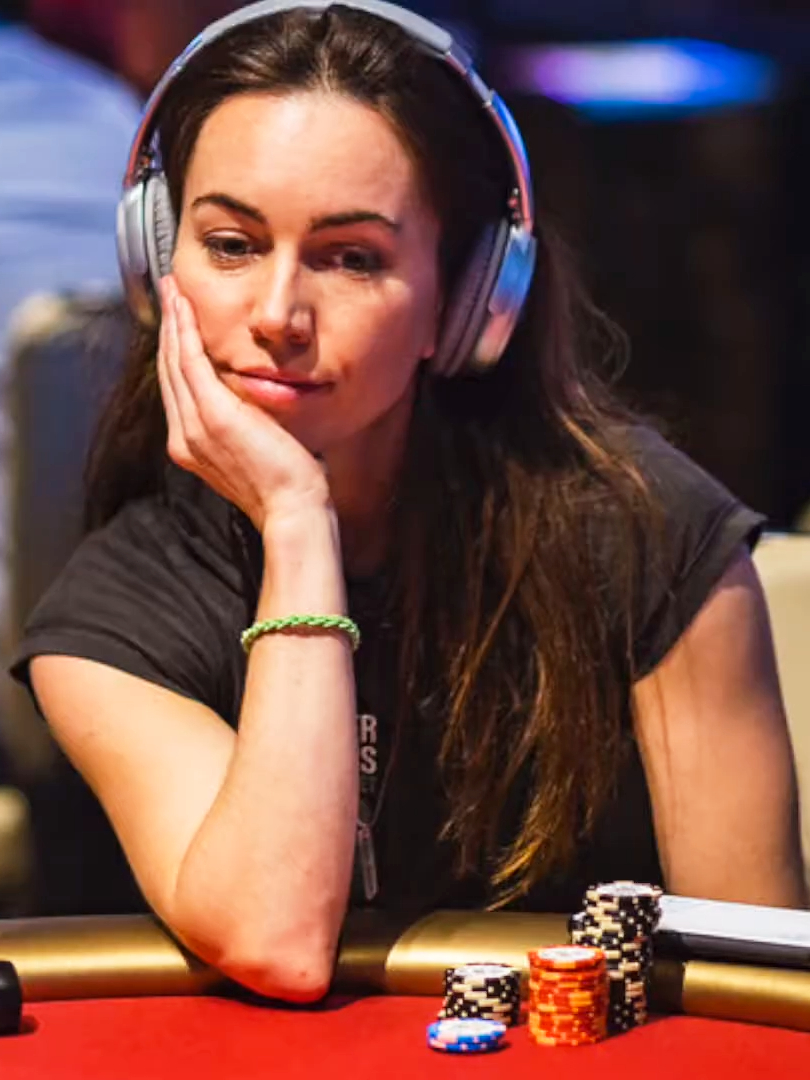
- Liv Boeree in 2019
- Nicknames: Iron Maiden, Poker Queen
- Born: 18 July 1984 (age 42); Hollingbourne, Kent, England

World Series of Poker
- Bracelet: 1
- Final tables: 2
- Money finishes: 28
- Highest WSOP Main Event finish: 314th, 2017

World Poker Tour
- Title: None
- Final table: 1
- Money finishes: 4

European Poker Tour
- Title: 1
- Final tables: 6
- Money finishes: 22
- Spouse: Igor Kurganov (m. 2025)

Olivia "Liv" Boeree (born 18 July 1984) is a British science communicator, philanthropist, host of the Win-Win podcast, and professional poker player. She is a World Series of Poker (WSOP) and European Poker Tour (EPT) champion, and is the only female player in history to win both a WSOP bracelet and an EPT event. Boeree is a 3× winner of the Global Poker Index European Female Player of the year. As of December 2024, having first retired in late 2019, Boeree still ranks among the top five women in poker history in terms of all-time money winnings, sitting at fourth all-time in the female category, and currently holds the record for the highest pay-out in a poker tournament for a woman at $2,800,000.

== Early life ==
Boeree was born in Hollingbourne, Kent in the South East of England, on 18 July 1984 and studied at Ashford School before going on to earn a First Class Honours degree in Physics with Astrophysics at the University of Manchester. During this time she played lead guitar in heavy metal bands Dissonance and Nemhaim and modelled for a number of alternative clothing brands such as Alchemy Gothic.

== Poker career ==
Boeree was introduced to the poker industry when she was selected as one of five contestants for the reality TV show Ultimatepoker.com Showdown, which aired on Five in autumn 2005. During the show she was coached by top poker players Phil Hellmuth, Annie Duke, and Dave Ulliott.

In May 2008, she won the 2008 Ladbrokes European Ladies Championships for $30,000.

On 21 April 2010, Boeree won the European Poker Tour main event in Sanremo, at the time the largest ever poker tournament held on European soil. Boeree won €1,250,000 and thereby became the third woman ever to win an EPT title.

At the 2017 World Series of Poker in Las Vegas, Boeree won event #2 (the "$10,000 Tag Team No-Limit Hold'em Championship") for $273,964 with Russian poker player and boyfriend Igor Kurganov.

Other notable results include a runner-up finish in the 2014 UKIPT Edinburgh Main Event, 1st place on Poker After Dark in 2017 and a 3rd-place finish in the EPT Barcelona High Roller event for €391,000 in August 2015.

Boeree won Female Player of the Year in 2014, 2015 and 2016 at the European Poker Awards, as determined by Global Poker Index points she accumulated during those years. She was also awarded "Europe's Leading Lady" in 2010 at the European Poker Awards.

Boeree became a member of Team PokerStars Pro in September 2010. In November 2019, she announced on Twitter that she had left Team PokerStars after nine years and would quit professional poker.

In December 2024, Boeree returned to poker in the 2024 World Series of Poker Paradise Event, held in The Bahamas. She finished fourth in the $25,000 WSOP Super Main Event tournament, cashing out at $2,800,000. This cash-out put her in fourth place on the woman's all-time money list and also saw her break the record for the biggest-ever cash by a female poker player.

As of August 2025, her total live tournament earnings exceed $6,669,290.

=== World Series of Poker bracelets ===
Year	Tournament	Prize (US$)
2017	$10,000 Tag Team No Limit Hold'em Championship	$273,964

== Philanthropy ==
In 2014, Boeree co-founded with the Russian poker player Igor Kurganov Raising for Effective Giving, an organisation that promotes a rational approach to philanthropy often referred to as effective altruism, and provides advice on choosing charities based on certain criteria.

Boere and Kurganov married at the Burning Man festival in 2025.

As of July 2020, Raising for Effective Giving has raised over $14,000,000 for its supported charities. In 2017, Boeree became a member of Giving What We Can, a community of people who have pledged to give at least 10% of their income to effective charities.

Boeree has spoken frequently about the issues with factory farming and other inhumane animal husbandry practices, and announced in 2024 that 20% of her World Series of Poker winnings are being donated to this cause area, for a total of $560,000.

Since 2015, Boeree has raised concerns about possible risks from the development of artificial intelligence and supports research that is directed at safe AI development.

In 2020, she became an ambassador for Longview Philanthropy, which advises large-scale philanthropists on their donation strategy around global catastrophic risk mitigation.

In January 2023, Boeree was awarded a Doctorate of Science, Honoris Causa, from the University of Hull in recognition of her contributions to STEM education and outreach.

== Television and film ==
Boeree's TV hosting credits include The Weather Channel's Weird Earth, Discovery Channel's The Mind Control Freaks in 2015–2016, and Red Bull TV's MindGamers in 2017.

From 2011 to 2013, she co-hosted UK and Ireland Poker Tour, a weekly show that aired on Channel 4 in the UK. Her poker TV appearances also include NBC's Heads Up Poker in 2011 and 2013, Channel 4's Shark Cage in 2014 and the European Poker Tour from 2010 to 2016 and Poker After Dark on Poker Central in 2017.

In 2011, Boeree was a member of the Celebrity Graduate Manchester University team that took part in BBC2's seasonal general knowledge tournament, Christmas University Challenge.

== Speaker ==
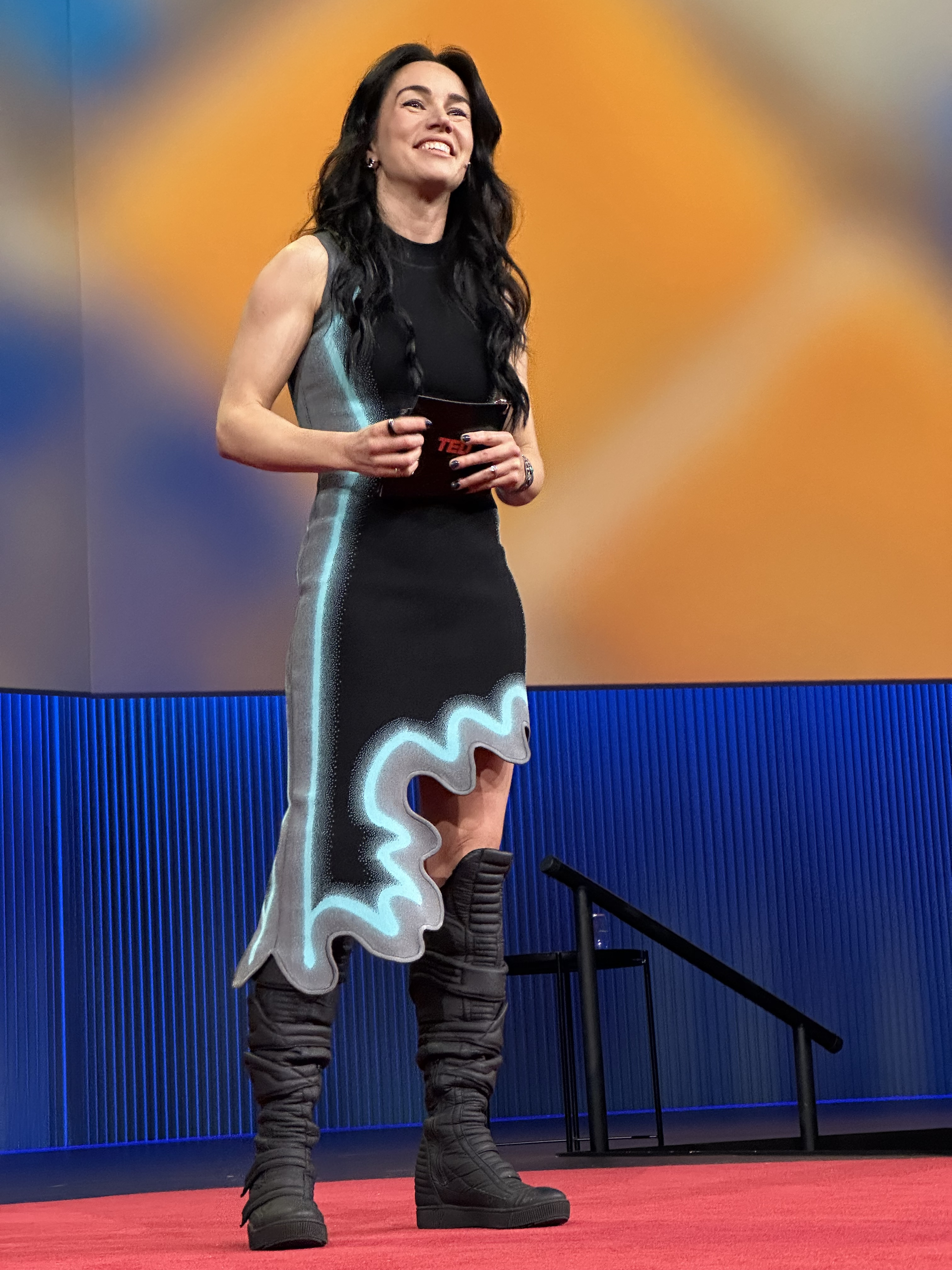
Liv Boeree at TED 2025

Boeree gave her first TEDx talk at TEDxManchester in February 2018 on the benefits of thinking in probabilities. One month later she spoke at the TED 2018 Conference in Vancouver during their inaugural "TED Unplugged" session. Her topic was "3 lessons on decision-making from a poker champion".

Boeree appeared as a guest speaker at Oxford University Union in May 2016, Jesus College, Cambridge in February 2017, the Cheltenham Science Festival in June 2016, Websummit Dublin in Nov 2015 and Effective Altruism Global, Google HQ in San Francisco Aug 2015

Boeree also appeared on Sean M. Carroll's Mindscape podcast (Episode 6, aired on 24 July 2018) to discuss probability and effective altruism.

Boeree appeared on Lex Fridman's podcast (aired 24 August 2022) to discuss poker, game theory, AI, simulation theory, aliens & existential risk.

== Writing ==
Boeree has written a number of articles and opinion pieces on various scientific and rationality topics. Her publications include a Vox.com article discussing the philosophical implications of Future of Humanity Institute's 2018 Paper "Dissolving the Fermi Paradox", a Vice Media article on a discovered crystalline pattern in prime numbers, and an opinion piece in The Independent on the importance of rational thinking classes in mainstream education. Her June 2020 byline in Nature, reviewing the latest book by Maria Konnikova, lists her as a "science communicator and former professional poker player."
