= 2009 World Series of Poker results =

The 2009 World Series of Poker was the 40th annual World Series of Poker (WSOP). Held in Las Vegas at the Rio All Suite Hotel and Casino, the 2009 series began on May 27 and featured 57 poker championships in several variants. All events but the $10,000 World Championship No Limit Texas hold 'em Main Event, the most prestigious of the WSOP events, ended by July 15. The final table of the Main Event, known as the November Nine, was suspended until November, to allow for better television coverage. Following the WSOP custom since 1976, each of the event winners received a championship bracelet in addition to that event's prize money, which this year ranged from US$87,778 for the $500 Casino Employees No-Limit Hold'em to US$8,546,435 for the Main Event.

== WSOP game variants ==
Most of the tournaments played at the WSOP are variants of Texas Hold 'em. Hold 'em is a community card game where each player may use any combination of the five community cards and the player's own two hole cards to make a poker hand, in contrast to poker variants such as stud or draw in which each player holds a separate individual hand. Between 2000 and 2009, hold'em surpassed seven-card stud as the most common game in U.S. casinos. Seven-card stud is a poker variant wherein each player is dealt two hole cards and one face-up to start the hand, followed by three more face-up cards one at a time, and then another hidden card, with betting after each round. Another poker variant played is Omaha, a game in which each player is dealt four hole cards and must use exactly two of them in conjunction with three community cards to make the best possible five-card hand. Other games played at the 2008 tournament included Razz, HORSE, and Deuce-to-Seven.

Within each of these poker variants a myriad of options exist. For example, depending on the betting structure, a tournament might be described as no limit, limit or pot-limit. Games may also include other variations on the rules governing the execution of the specific game such as shootout, eight or better, or heads up.

== 2009 highlights ==
There were 57 events, two more than in 2008. The main event had 6,494 buy-ins, 350 fewer than the previous year. Other changes for 2009 include the elimination of rebuy events and the introduction of triple starting chips.

In recognition that 2009 was the 40th WSOP, the tournament started with a special $40,000 No-Limit event. As one of the most expensive poker tournaments ever, the event attracted what considered to be one of the toughest poker fields ever assembled. Poker pro, Vitaly Lunkin, won his second bracelet in this event. Lunkin then finished in second place at the $10,000 pot-limit Omaha event and the $50,000 HORSE Championship, finishing the summer with over $2.7 million. David Bach, a player with several final table appearances, won his first bracelet in the $50,000 HORSE Championship. At 18 hours and 44 minutes the final table of the $50K HORSE event was the second longest final table in WSOP history.

Jeff Lisandro became the fifth player to ever win three bracelets in the same year, and the first ever to win bracelets in all three stud variants offered at the WSOP (stud high-only, stud high-low, and Razz) in the same year. Poker superstar Barry Greenstein, said that "A lot of people might have said before this year, we may not ever see another guy win three bracelets because the fields are so big... Lisandro proved them wrong." He was the first player to do so since Phil Ivey did it in 2002. By winning two bracelets, Ivey, considered by many to be the best overall poker player in the world, became the youngest player to ever amass seven WSOP bracelets. The milestone means he is tied with Poker Hall of Famer Billy Baxter at sixth place on the most bracelets list.

Due to capacity limitations, the 2009 WSOP turned away over 500 players from the Main Event. Patrik Antonius, T. J. Cloutier, Layne Flack, Ted Forrest, Brandon Adams, Richard Ashby, and Mickey Appleman were among the notable players turned away from the Main Event. 1996 WSOP champion Huck Seed would have been included in that list, if he had not won the National Heads-Up Poker Championship which meant he was guaranteed entry into the 2009 WSOP Main Event.

Another tournament which met its capacity limits was the "$1,000 buy-in Stimulus Special." This event set a new record for a non-main event tournament with 6,012 participants.

== Results ==
Key

*	Elected to the Poker Hall of Fame
(#/#)	This denotes a bracelet winner. The first number is the number of bracelets won in 2009. The second number is the total number of bracelets won. Both numbers represent totals as of that point during the tournament.
Place	The place in which the player finished.
Name	The player who made it to the final table
Prize ($)	The amount of money, in U.S. Dollars ($), awarded for each finish at the event's final table

=== Event 1: $500 Casino Employees No Limit Hold'em ===
- 2-Day Event: Wednesday, May 27 to Thursday, May 28
- Number of buy-ins: 866
- Total prize pool: $389,700
- Number of payouts: 81
- Winning hand: 6♣ 6♥

Final Table
Place	Name	Prize
1st	Andrew Cohen (1/1)	$83,778
2nd	Paul McPeterson	$51,787
3rd	Casey Kuhn	$33,923
4th	Grant Yasui	$23,483
5th	Jun Dulay	$17,127
6th	Bobby Rooney	$13,125
7th	John McAvoy	$10,545
8th	Ferdinand Boleski	$8,866
9th	Sammy Porter	$7,782

=== Event 2: $40,000 No Limit Hold'em ===
- 4-Day Event: Thursday, May 28 to Sunday, May 31
- Number of buy-ins: 201
- Total prize pool: $7,718,400^{[a]}
- Number of payouts: 27
- Winning hand: A♠ A♥

Final Table
Place	Name	Prize
1st	Vitaly Lunkin (1/2)	$1,891,012
2nd	Isaac Haxton	$1,168,566
3rd	Greg Raymer (0/1)	$774,927
4th	Dani Stern	$548,315
5th	Justin Bonomo	$413,166
6th	Alec Torelli	$329,730
7th	Lex Veldhuis	$277,940
8th	Noah Schwartz	$246,834
9th	Ted Forrest (0/5)	$230,317

=== Event 3: $1,500 Omaha Hi-Low Split-8 or Better ===
- 3-Day Event: Friday, May 29 to Sunday, May 31
- Number of buy-ins: 918^{[b]}
- Total prize pool: $1,253,070
- Number of payouts: 90
- Winning hand: Q♣ 9♦ 8♣ 7♦

Final Table
Place	Name	Prize
1st	Thang Luu (1/2)	$263,135
2nd	Ed Smith	$162,110
3rd	Ming Reslock	$106,373
4th	Robert Price	$73,405
5th	Pascal Leyo	$53,293
6th	Jordan Rich	$40,612
7th	Jim Geary	$32,404
8th	Freddy Deeb (0/2)	$27,029
9th	Senovio Ramirez III	$23,520

=== Event 4: $1,000 No Limit Hold'em ===
- 5-Day Event: Saturday, May 30 to Wednesday, June 3^{[c]}
- Number of buy-ins: 6,012^{[d]}
- Total prize pool: $5,410,800
- Number of payouts: 621
- Winning hand: K♠ K♥

Final Table
Place	Name	Prize
1st	Steve Sung (1/1)	$771,106
2nd	Peter Vilandos (0/1)	$473,283
3rd	James Matz	$313,826
4th	Larry Sidebotham	$227,254
5th	Nathan Mullen	$175,851
6th	Dan Heimiller (0/1)	$145,009
7th	Jeff Oakes	$126,613
8th	Phong Huynh	$117,414
9th	Danny Fuhs	$114,168

=== Event 5: $1,500 Pot Limit Omaha ===
- 3-Day Event: Monday, June 1 to Wednesday, June 3
- Number of buy-ins: 809
- Total prize pool: $1,042,085
- Number of payouts: 81
- Winning hand: Q♣ J♦ 8♦ 2♠

Final Table
Place	Name	Prize
1st	Jason Mercier (1/1)	$237,415
2nd	Steven Burkholder	$146,748
3rd	Kevin Iacofano	$96,128
4th	Matt Giannetti	$66,544
5th	Chris Biondino	$48,533
6th	Jonathan Tare	$37,192
7th	Dario Alioto (0/1)	$29,882
8th	An Tran (0/1)	$25,122
9th	Vic Park	$22,053

=== Event 6: $10,000 World Championship Seven Card Stud ===
- 3-Day Event: Monday, June 1 to Wednesday, June 3
- Number of buy-ins: 142
- Total prize pool: $1,134,800
- Number of payouts: 16
- Winning hand: 8♦ 8♥ 4♥ 9♥ 3♦ J♥ 2♥

Final Table
Place	Name	Prize
1st	Freddie Ellis (1/1)	$373,744
2nd	Eric Drache	$231,014
3rd	Ville Wahlbeck	$152,915
4th	Max Pescatori (0/2)	$107,959
5th	Hasan Habib (0/1)	$80,969
6th	Ivan Schertzer	$64,297
7th	Greg Mueller	$53,886
8th	Tim Phan	$47,532

=== Event 7: $1,500 No Limit Hold'em ===
- 3-Day Event: Tuesday, June 2 to Thursday, June 4
- Number of buy-ins: 2,791
- Total prize pool: $3,809,715
- Number of payouts: 297
- Winning hand: A♦ Q♠

Final Table
Place	Name	Prize
1st	Travis Johnson (1/1)	$666,853
2nd	Steve Karp	$414,116
3rd	Michael Ciotola	$273,385
4th	Mark Salinaro	$193,343
5th	Craig McConville	$145,721
6th	Brian McInnis	$116,234
7th	Walter Wright	$97,985
8th	James McClain	$87,013
9th	Anthony Esposito	$81,185

=== Event 8: $2,500 No Limit 2-7 Draw Lowball ===
- 3-Day Event: Tuesday, June 2 to Thursday, June 4
- Number of buy-ins: 147
- Total prize pool: $338,100
- Number of payouts: 21
- Winning hand: 7♣ 6♦ 5♥ 4♥ 2♠

Final Table
Place	Name	Prize
1st	Phil Ivey (1/6)	$96,361
2nd	John Monnette	$59,587
3rd	Yan Chen	$38,892
4th	Eric Kesselman (0/1)	$26,757
5th	Rodeen Talebi	$19,346
6th	Raphael Zimmerman	$14,663
7th	Elia Ahmadian	$11,627

=== Event 9: $1,500 No Limit Hold'em Short Handed ===
- 3-Day Event: Wednesday, June 3 to Friday, June 5
- Number of buy-ins: 1,459
- Total prize pool: $1,991,535
- Number of payouts: 144
- Winning hand: K♠ Q♦

Final Table
Place	Name	Prize
1st	Ken Aldridge (1/1)	$428,259
2nd	Carman Cavella	$264,814
3rd	Peter Gould	$170,953
4th	Bryce Yockey	$115,230
5th	Charles Furey	$80,896
6th	Manny Minaya	$59,049

=== Event 10: $2,500 Pot Limit Hold'em/Omaha ===
- 3-Day Event: Wednesday, June 3 to Friday, June 5
- Number of buy-ins: 453
- Total prize pool: $1,041,900
- Number of payouts: 45
- Winning hand: 9♣ 9♠

Final Table
Place	Name	Prize
1st	Rami Boukai (1/1)	$244,862
2nd	Najib Bennani	$151,335
3rd	Ben Grundy	$99,574
4th	Cornel Cimpan	$69,546
5th	Daniel Makowsky	$51,313
6th	Paul Parker	$39,904
7th	Pawel Andrzejewski	$32,653
8th	John Kabbaj	$28,006
9th	Sigi Stockinger	$25,151

=== Event 11: $2,000 No Limit Hold'em ===
- 3-Day Event: Thursday, June 4 to Saturday, June 6
- Number of buy-ins: 1,646
- Total prize pool: $2,995,720
- Number of payouts: 171
- Winning hand: Q♠ 10♦

Final Table
Place	Name	Prize
1st	Anthony Harb (1/1)	$569,199
2nd	Peter Rho	$350,019
3rd	Jim Geary	$230,670
4th	Adam Adler	$161,768
5th	Jonathan McGowan	$116,833
6th	Adrian Dresel-Velasquez	$92,867
7th	Scott Hall	$76,390
8th	Michael Dyer	$65,905
9th	Brent Sheirbon	$59,315

=== Event 12: $10,000 World Championship Mixed Event ===
- 3-Day Event: Thursday, June 4 to Saturday, June 6
- Number of buy-ins: 194
- Total prize pool: $1,823,600
- Number of payouts: 24
- Winning hand: A♦ Q♦ 8♦ 8♠ (Omaha-8)

Final Table
Place	Name	Prize
1st	Ville Wahlbeck (1/1)	$492,375
2nd	David Chiu (0/4)	$304,176
3rd	Scott Dorin	$199,940
4th	Mark Gregorich	$139,159
5th	Huck Seed (0/4)	$102,286
6th	James Van Alstyne	$79,181
7th	Mike Wattel (0/1)	$64,373
8th	Todd Brunson (0/1)	$54,854

=== Event 13: $2,500 No Limit Hold'em ===
- 3-Day Event: Friday, June 5 to Sunday, June 7
- Number of buy-ins: 1,088
- Total prize pool: $2,502,400
- Number of payouts: 117
- Winning hand: J♠ J♣

Final table
Place	Name	Prize
1st	Keven Stammen (1/1)	$506,786
2nd	Ángel Guillén	$312,800
3rd	Shawn Glines	$202,694
4th	Bahador Ahmadi	$139,934
5th	Torrey Reily	$100,446
6th	Antoine Berube	$75,547
7th	Oktay Altinbas	$59,356
8th	Matthew Lynn	$48,621
9th	Gregg Merkow	$41,439

=== Event 14: $2,500 Limit Hold'em Short Handed ===
- 3-Day Event: Friday, June 5 to Sunday, June 7
- Number of buy-ins: 367
- Total prize pool: $844,100
- Number of payouts: 36
- Winning hand: A♦ J♠

Final table
Place	Name	Prize
1st	Brock Parker (1/1)	$223,688
2nd	Daniel Negreanu (0/4)	$138,280
3rd	Tommi Hörkkö	$89,660
4th	Kevin Hong	$60,885
5th	Barry Shulman (0/1)	$43,201
6th	Kyle Ray	$31,966

=== Event 15: $5,000 No Limit Hold'em ===
- 3-Day Event: Saturday, June 6 to Monday, June 8
- Number of buy-ins: 655
- Total prize pool: $3,078,500
- Number of payouts: 63
- Winning hand: A♦ 8♣

Final table
Place	Name	Prize
1st	Brian Lemke (1/1)	$692,658
2nd	Fabian Quoss	$427,912
3rd	Thomas Keller (0/1)	$280,852
4th	Mike Sowers	$194,931
5th	Lika Gerasimova	$142,688
6th	Danny Illingworth	$109,872
7th	Isaac Baron	$88,784
8th	Billy Kopp	$75,115
9th	Christian Iacobellis	$66,403

=== Event 16: $1,500 Seven Card Stud ===
- 3-Day Event: Saturday, June 6 to Monday, June 8
- Number of buy-ins: 359
- Total prize pool: $490,035
- Number of payouts: 40
- Winning hand: A♦ K♦ 5♦ K♠ 10♦ 8♦ 6♥

Final table
Place	Name	Prize
1st	Jeff Lisandro (1/2)	$124,959
2nd	Rodney H. Pardey (0/2)	$77,230
3rd	Steven Stencil	$50,626
4th	Nick Frangos	$35,087
5th	John Juanda (0/4)	$25,634
6th	Eric Pardey	$19,690
7th	Daniel Studer	$15,862
8th	Mitch Schock	$13,373

=== Event 17: $1,000 Ladies No Limit Hold'em World Championship ===
- 3-Day Event: Sunday, June 7 to Tuesday, June 9
- Number of buy-ins: 1,060
- Total prize pool: $964,600
- Number of payouts: 117
- Winning hand: Q♠ 8♠

Final table
Place	Name	Prize
1st	Lisa Hamilton (1/1)	$195,390
2nd	Lori Bender	$120,575
3rd	Mari Lou Morelli	$78,132
4th	Angel Pedroza	$53,940
5th	Kimberly Cunningham	$38,719
6th	Kim Rios	$29,121
7th	Lisa Parsons	$22,880
8th	Dawn Thomas	$18,742
9th	Lisa Santy	$15,973

=== Event 18: $10,000 World Championship Omaha Hi-Low Split-8 or Better ===
- 3-Day Event: Sunday, June 7 to Tuesday, June 9
- Number of buy-ins: 179
- Total prize pool: $1,682,600
- Number of payouts: 18
- Winning hand: A♦ K♣ K♥ 4♣

Final table
Place	Name	Prize
1st	Daniel Alaei (1/2)	$445,898
2nd	Scott Clements (0/2)	$275,946
3rd	Ben Boyd	$182,730
4th	Daniel Negreanu (0/4)	$130,401
5th	John Monnette	$97,422
6th	Greg Jamison	$77,736
7th	Tom Koral	$65,453
8th	Annie Duke (0/1)	$58,049
9th	Yueqi Zhu	$54,179

=== Event 19: $2,500 No Limit Hold'em Short Handed ===
- 3-Day Event: Monday, June 8 to Wednesday, June 10
- Number of buy-ins: 1,068
- Total prize pool: $2,456,400
- Number of payouts: 108
- Winning hand: Q♠ Q♦

Final table
Place	Name	Prize
1st	Brock Parker (2/2)	$552,745
2nd	Joe Serock	$341,783
3rd	Russell Crane	$220,633
4th	Jesse Rios	$148,661
5th	Alexander Wilson	$104,323
6th	Clayton Newman	$76,123

=== Event 20: $1,500 Pot Limit Hold'em ===
- 3-Day Event: Tuesday, June 9 to Thursday, June 11
- Number of buy-ins: 633
- Total prize pool: $864,045
- Number of payouts: 63
- Winning hand: A♠ Q♥

Final table
Place	Name	Prize
1st	J.P. Kelly (1/1)	$194,434
2nd	Marc Tschirch	$120,102
3rd	Jason DeWitt	$78,826
4th	Kyle Carlston	$54,711
5th	Aaron Virchis	$40,048
6th	Kirk Steward	$30,837
7th	Erik Seidel (0/8)	$24,919
8th	Andrew Radel	$21,082
9th	Ravi Raghavan	$18,637

=== Event 21: $3,000 H.O.R.S.E. ===
- 3-Day Event: Tuesday, June 9 to Thursday, June 11
- Number of buy-ins: 452
- Total prize pool: $1,247,520
- Number of payouts: 48
- Winning hand: 6♥ 6♠ (Hold'em)

Final table
Place	Name	Prize
1st	Zac Fellows (1/1)	$311,899
2nd	James Van Alstyne	$192,866
3rd	Tim Finne	$126,199
4th	Michele Limongi	$87,264
5th	Chris Amaral	$63,536
6th	Martin Eikeng	$48,590
7th	Gabriel Nassif	$38,947
8th	Matt Hawrilenko (1/1)	$32,647

=== Event 22: $1,500 No Limit Hold'em Shootout ===
- 3-Day Event: Wednesday, June 10 to Friday, June 12
- Number of buy-ins: 1,000
- Total prize pool: $1,363,635
- Number of payouts: 100
- Winning hand: K♣ 5♦

Final table
Place	Name	Prize
1st	Jeff Carris (1/1)	$313,673
2nd	Jason Somerville	$194,004
3rd	Andrew Margolis	$124,158
4th	Christopher Moore	$82,322
5th	Joseph Cutler	$56,440
6th	Brandon Wong	$39,968
7th	Eugene Katchalov	$29,195
8th	Michael McNeil	$21,981
9th	Joshua Tieman	$17,045
10th	Mike Shannon	$13,609

=== Event 23: $10,000 World Championship No Limit 2-7 Draw Lowball ===
- 3-Day Event: Wednesday, June 10 to Friday, June 12
- Number of buy-ins: 96
- Total prize pool: $902,400
- Number of payouts: 14
- Winning hand: 7-5-4-3-2

Final table
Place	Name	Prize
1st	Nick Schulman (1/1)	$279,742
2nd	Ville Wahlbeck (1/1)	$172,864
3rd	Steve Sung (1/1)	$112,042
4th	John Juanda (0/4)	$75,964
5th	Archie Karas	$53,783
6th	Vince Musso	$39,697
7th	David Benyamine (0/1)	$30,492

=== Event 24: $1,500 No Limit Hold'em ===
- 3-Day Event: Thursday, June 11 to Saturday, June 13
- Number of buy-ins: 2,506
- Total prize pool: $3,420,690
- Number of payouts: 270
- Winning hand: A♥ 5♣

Final table
Place	Name	Prize
1st	Peter Vilandos (1/2)	$607,256
2nd	Andy Seth	$372,855
3rd	Michael Greco	$248,855
4th	Glenn McCaffrey	$176,165
5th	Dean Hamrick	$132,380
6th	Alan Jaffray	$105,699
7th	David Lerman	$88,937
8th	Ronnie Kevin	$79,017
9th	Brian Fitzpatrick	$73,886

=== Event 25: $2,500 Omaha/Seven Card Stud Hi-Low-8 or Better ===
- 3-Day Event: Thursday, June 11 to Saturday, June 13
- Number of buy-ins: 376
- Total prize pool: $864,800
- Number of payouts: 40
- Winning hand: Q♦ Q♠ 3♣ 5♣ 8♠ 7♣ Q♣

Final table
Place	Name	Prize
1st	Phil Ivey (2/7)	$220,538
2nd	Ming Lee	$136,292
3rd	Carlos Mortensen (0/2)	$89,342
4th	Dutch Boyd (0/1)	$61,919
5th	Jon Turner	$45,237
6th	Eric Buchman	$34,747
7th	Tom Koral	$27,993
8th	Peter Gelencser	$23,600

=== Event 26: $1,500 Limit Hold'em ===
- 3-Day Event: Friday, June 12 to Sunday, June 14
- Number of buy-ins: 643
- Total prize pool: $877,695
- Number of payouts: 63
- Winning hand: A♠ 4♣

Final table
Place	Name	Prize
1st	Tomas Alenius (1/1)	$197,488
2nd	Jason Tam	$122,000
3rd	Al Barbieri	$80,072
4th	Glenn Engelbert	$55,576
5th	Demetrios Arvanetes	$40,681
6th	Dominik Kulicki	$31,325
7th	Rep Porter (0/1)	$25,313
8th	Kim-Phong Duong	$21,416
9th	Cole Miller	$18,932

=== Event 27: $5,000 Pot Limit Omaha Hi-Low Split-8 or Better ===
- 3-Day Event: Friday, June 12 to Sunday, June 14
- Number of buy-ins: 198
- Total prize pool: $930,600
- Number of payouts: 18
- Winning hand: A♦ Q♣ 8♦ 4♥

Final table
Place	Name	Prize
1st	Roland De Wolfe (1/1)	$246,616
2nd	Brett Richey	$152,618
3rd	Scott Clements (0/2)	$101,063
4th	Robert Campbell	$72,121
5th	Alex Kravchenko (0/1)	$53,881
6th	Andrew Black	$42,993
7th	John Racener	$36,200
8th	Armando Ruiz	$32,105
9th	Anthony Lellouche	$29,965

=== Event 28: $1,500 No Limit Hold'em ===
- 3-Day Event: Saturday, June 13 to Monday, June 15
- Number of buy-ins: 2,638
- Total prize pool: $3,600,870
- Number of payouts: 270
- Winning hand: 8♥ 7♦

Final table
Place	Name	Prize
1st	Mike Eise (1/1)	$639,331
2nd	Jeff Chang	$392,494
3rd	Rico Ramirez	$261,963
4th	Jason Potter	$185,444
5th	Barry Berger	$139,353
6th	Zack Fritz	$111,266
7th	Avi Braz	$93,622
8th	Jose Luis Franco	$83,180
9th	Mike Zulker	$77,778

=== Event 29: $10,000 World Championship Heads Up No Limit Hold'em ===
- 4-Day Event: Saturday, June 13 to Tuesday, June 16
- Number of buy-ins: 256
- Total prize pool: $2,406,400
- Number of payouts: 32
- Winning hand: 5♥ 3♥

Final table
Place	Name	Prize
1st	Leo Wolpert (1/1)	$625,682
2nd	John Duthie	$386,636
SF	Jamin Stokes	$214,289
SF	Nathan Doudney	$214,289
QF	Johnny Chan* (0/10)	$92,580
QF	Dustin Woolf	$92,580
QF	Steve O'Dwyer	$92,580
QF	Bryan Pellegrino	$92,580

=== Event 30: $2,500 Pot Limit Omaha ===
- 3-Day Event: Sunday, June 14 to Tuesday, June 16
- Number of buy-ins: 436
- Total prize pool: $1,002,800
- Number of payouts: 45
- Winning hand: K♠ Q♥ 8♣ 8♥

Final table
Place	Name	Prize
1st	J.C. Tran (1/2)	$235,685
2nd	Jeff Kimber	$145,656
3rd	Jean-Philippe Leandri	$95,837
4th	Ross Boatman	$66,936
5th	Dallas Flowers	$49,387
6th	Rami Boukai (1/1)	$38,407
7th	Chad Layne	$31,427
8th	Theo Jorgensen (0/1)	$26,955
9th	John Juanda (0/4)	$24,207

=== Event 31: $1,500 H.O.R.S.E. ===
- 3-Day Event: Sunday, June 14 to Tuesday, June 16
- Number of buy-ins: 770
- Total prize pool: $1,051,050
- Number of payouts: 72
- Winning hand: 7♠ 6♦ 10♣ 5♥ Q♦ 10♥ 4♦ (Stud)

Final table
Place	Name	Prize
1st	James Van Alstyne (1/1)	$247,033
2nd	Tad Jurgens	$152,654
3rd	Mitch Schock	$100,165
4th	Bryan Micon	$69,505
5th	Shannon Shorr	$50,881
6th	Brian Malcolm	$39,183
7th	Fabrice Soulier	$31,657
8th	Ron Schiffman	$26,780

=== Event 32: $2,000 No Limit Hold'em ===
- 3-Day Event: Monday, June 15 to Wednesday, June 17
- Number of buy-ins: 1,534
- Total prize pool: $2,791,880
- Number of payouts: 171
- Winning hand: 3♠ 3♦

Final table
Place	Name	Prize
1st	Ángel Guillén (1/1)	$530,548
2nd	Mika Paasonen	$326,000
3rd	Jason Boyes	$214,000
4th	Steve Kohner	$150,000
5th	Eric Ladny	$108,883
6th	Daniel Makowsky	$86,548
7th	Chris MacNeil	$71,192
8th	Antoine Amourette	$61,421
9th	Clark Hamagami	$55,279

=== Event 33: $10,000 World Championship Limit Hold'em ===
- 3-Day Event: Monday, June 15 to Wednesday, June 17
- Number of buy-ins: 185
- Total prize pool: $1,739,000
- Number of payouts: 18
- Winning hand: 5♠ 5♦

Final table
Place	Name	Prize
1st	Greg Mueller (1/1)	$460,836
2nd	Pat Pezzin	$285,196
3rd	Chad Brown	$188,855
4th	Daniel Alaei (1/2)	$134,733
5th	Matt Hawrilenko (1/1)	$100,688
6th	Matt Glantz	$80,342
7th	Michiel Brummelhuis	$67,647
8th	Soheil Shamseddin	$59,996
9th	Kenny Hsiung	$55,996

=== Event 34: $1,500 No Limit Hold'em ===
- 3-Day Event: Tuesday, June 16 to Thursday, June 18
- Number of buy-ins: 2,095
- Total prize pool: $2,859,675
- Number of payouts: 216
- Winning hand: 10♣ 10♥

Final table
Place	Name	Prize
1st	Eric Baldwin (1/1)	$521,932
2nd	Jonas Klausen	$322,371
3rd	James Taylor	$213,046
4th	Benjamin Scholl	$150,133
5th	Roland De Wolfe (1/1)	$112,957
6th	Andrew Youngblood	$89,222
7th	Steven Bradbury	$74,352
8th	Martin Jacobson	$65,487
9th	Eric DeFontes	$60,335

=== Event 35: $5,000 Pot Limit Omaha ===
- 3-Day Event: Wednesday, June 17 to Friday, June 19
- Number of buy-ins: 363
- Total prize pool: $1,706,100
- Number of payouts: 36
- Winning hand: Q♥ J♠ 8♣ 5♣

Final table
Place	Name	Prize
1st	Richard Austin (1/1)	$409,484
2nd	Sorel Mizzi	$253,048
3rd	Cliff Josephy (0/1)	$166,771
4th	Dan Hindin	$116,748
5th	Rifat Palevic	$86,516
6th	Felipe Ramos	$67,663
7th	Van Marcus	$55,687
8th	Peter Jetten	$48,112
9th	Samuel Ngai	$43,539

=== Event 36: $2,000 No Limit Hold'em ===
- 3-Day Event: Thursday, June 18 to Saturday, June 20
- Number of buy-ins: 1,695
- Total prize pool: $3,084,900
- Number of payouts: 171
- Winning hand: 9♦ 7♦

Final table
Place	Name	Prize
1st	Jordan Smith (1/1)	$586,212
2nd	Ken Lennaárd	$360,439
3rd	Laurence Grondin	$237,537
4th	Joe Morneau	$166,584
5th	Anthony Roux	$120,311
6th	Pat Atchison	$95,631
7th	Almira Skripchenko	$78,664
8th	Andrew Seden	$67,867
9th	Jonathan Plens	$61,081

=== Event 37: $10,000 World Championship Seven Card Stud Hi-Low Split-8 or Better ===
- 3-Day Event: Thursday, June 18 to Saturday, June 20
- Number of buy-ins: 164
- Total prize pool: $1,541,600
- Number of payouts: 16
- Winning hand: 2♠ 6♦ 6♠ 10♣ 10♥ K♥ 5♥

Final table
Place	Name	Prize
1st	Jeff Lisandro (2/3)	$431,656
2nd	Farzad Rouhani (0/1)	$266,804
3rd	Mike Wattel (0/1)	$176,605
4th	Frank Mariani	$124,684
5th	Yan Chen	$93,513
6th	Abe Mosseri	$74,258
7th	Doyle Brunson* (0/10)	$62,234
8th	Justin Smith	$54,896

=== Event 38: $2,000 Limit Hold'em ===
- 3-Day Event: Friday, June 19 to Sunday, June 21
- Number of buy-ins: 446
- Total prize pool: $811,720
- Number of payouts: 45
- Winning hand: Q♣ 8♠

Final table
Place	Name	Prize
1st	Marc Naalden (1/1)	$190,770
2nd	Steven Cowley	$117,902
3rd	Ian Johns (0/1)	$77,576
4th	Tommy Hang	$54,182
5th	Alex Keating	$39,977
6th	Danny Qutami	$31,088
7th	Jared O'Dell	$25,439
8th	Jameson Painter	$21,819
9th	Rep Porter (0/1)	$19,594

=== Event 39: $1,500 No Limit Hold'em ===
- 3-Day Event: Saturday, June 20 to Monday, June 22
- Number of buy-ins: 2,715
- Total prize pool: $3,705,975
- Number of payouts: 280
- Winning hand: Q♥ J♦

Final table
Place	Name	Prize
1st	Ray Foley (1/1)	$657,969
2nd	Brandon Cantu (0/1)	$403,951
3rd	Wei Mu	$269,609
4th	Alex Jacob	$190,857
5th	Tyler Spalding	$143,421
6th	Jonathan Markham	$114,514
7th	Chairud Vangchailued	$96,355
8th	Richard Lutes	$85,608
9th	Patrick O'Connor	$80,049

=== Event 40: $10,000 World Championship Pot Limit Omaha ===
- 3-Day Event: Saturday, June 20 to Monday, June 22
- Number of buy-ins: 295
- Total prize pool: $2,773,000
- Number of payouts: 27
- Winning hand: 10♣ 10♥ 6♣ 5♠

Final table
Place	Name	Prize
1st	Matt Graham (1/2)	$679,379
2nd	Vitaly Lunkin (1/2)	$419,832
3rd	Van Marcus	$278,409
4th	Robin Keston	$196,994
5th	Ferit Gabriellson	$148,439
6th	Stefan Mattsson	$118,463
7th	Josh Arieh (0/2)	$99,856
8th	Richard Austin (1/1)	$88,681
9th	Barry Greenstein (0/3)	$82,746

=== Event 41: $5,000 No Limit Hold'em Shootout ===
- 3-Day Event: Sunday, June 21 to Tuesday, June 23
- Number of buy-ins: 280
- Total prize pool: $1,316,000
- Number of payouts: 30
- Winning hand: A♠ K♦

Final table
Place	Name	Prize
1st	Péter Traply (1/1)	$348,728
2nd	Andrew Lichtenberger	$215,403
3rd	Maxim Lykov	$145,063
4th	Danny Wong	$105,609
5th	Nasr El Nasr	$82,697

=== Event 42: $2,500 Mixed Event ===
- 3-Day Event: Sunday, June 21 to Tuesday, June 23
- Number of buy-ins: 412
- Total prize pool: $947,600
- Number of payouts: 40
- Winning hand: 6♣ 5♠ (Hold'em)

Final table
Place	Name	Prize
1st	Jerrod Ankenman (1/1)	$241,637
2nd	Sergey Altbregin	$149,342
3rd	Chris Klodnicki	$97,897
4th	Jeff Tims	$67,848
5th	Jon Turner	$49,569
6th	Eric Crain	$38,075
7th	Layne Flack (0/6)	$30,674
8th	Dario Alioto (0/1)	$25,860

=== Event 43: $1,000 Seniors No Limit Hold'em World Championship ===
- 3-Day Event: Monday, June 22 to Wednesday, June 24
- Number of buy-ins: 2,707
- Total prize pool: $2,463,370
- Number of payouts: 270
- Winning hand: A♠ 9♦

Final table
Place	Name	Prize
1st	Michael Davis (1/1)	$437,358
2nd	Scott Buller	$268,507
3rd	Barry Bounds	$179,210
4th	Michael Morusty	$126,863
5th	Charles Simon	$95,332
6th	Dan DeLatorre	$76,118
7th	Art Duncan	$64,047
8th	Richard McCall	$56,903
9th	Robert Beck	$53,208

=== Event 44: $2,500 Razz ===
- 3-Day Event: Monday, June 22 to Wednesday, June 24
- Number of buy-ins: 315
- Total prize pool: $724,500
- Number of payouts: 32
- Winning hand: 10-8-4-4-9-7-J

Final table
Place	Name	Prize
1st	Jeff Lisandro (3/4)	$188,370
2nd	Michael Craig	$116,405
3rd	Ryan Fisler	$76,261
4th	Warwick Mirzikinian	$52,773
5th	Eric Rodawig	$38,471
6th	Kenna James	$29,473
7th	Steve Diano	$23,669
8th	Allen Bari	$19,880

=== Event 45: $10,000 World Championship Pot Limit Hold'em ===
- 3-Day Event: Tuesday, June 23 to Thursday, June 25
- Number of buy-ins: 275
- Total prize pool: $2,585,000
- Number of payouts: 27
- Winning hand: A♥ A♣

Final table
Place	Name	Prize
1st	John Kabbaj (1/1)	$633,335
2nd	Kirill Gerasimov	$391,369
3rd	Eric Baldwin (1/1)	$259,534
4th	Davidi Kitai (0/1)	$183,638
5th	J.C. Alvarado	$138,375
6th	Jason Lester (0/1)	$110,431
7th	Eugene Todd	$93,085
8th	Isaac Haxton	$82,668
9th	Darryll Fish	$77,136

=== Event 46: $2,500 Omaha Hi-Low Split-8 or Better ===
- 3-Day Event: Tuesday, June 23 to Thursday, June 25
- Number of buy-ins: 424
- Total prize pool: $975,200
- Number of payouts: 45
- Winning hand: 3♦ 4♣ 5♣ 10♠

Final table
Place	Name	Prize
1st	Derek Raymond (1/1)	$229,192
2nd	Mark Tenner	$141,647
3rd	Scott Bohlman	$93,199
4th	Fabio Coppola	$65,094
5th	Josh Schlein	$48,028
6th	Sirous Jamshidi	$37,350
7th	Michael Keiner (0/1)	$30,562
8th	Mark Gregorich	$26,213
9th	Pat Poels (0/2)	$23,541

=== Event 47: $2,500 Mixed Hold'em ===
- 3-Day Event: Wednesday, June 24 to Friday, June 26
- Number of buy-ins: 527
- Total prize pool: $1,212,100
- Number of payouts: 54
- Winning hand: J♦ 3♦ No-Limit Hold'em

Final table
Place	Name	Prize
1st	Bahador Ahmadi (1/1)	$278,804
2nd	John McGuiness	$172,227
3rd	Ylon Schwartz	$112,967
4th	Karlo Lopez	$78,628
5th	Barry Greenstein (0/3)	$57,671
6th	Matt Woodward	$44,520
7th	Randy Haddox	$36,084
8th	Hasan Habib (0/1)	$30,641
9th	Zachary Humphrey	$27,199

=== Event 48: $1,500 Pot Limit Omaha Hi-Low Split-8 or Better ===
- 3-Day Event: Thursday, June 25 to Saturday, June 27
- Number of buy-ins: 762
- Total prize pool: $1,040,130
- Number of payouts: 72
- Winning hand: A♥ 10♣ 7♣ 4♦

Final table
Place	Name	Prize
1st	Brandon Cantu (1/2)	$228,867
2nd	Lee Watkinson (0/1)	$141,873
3rd	Mathieu Jacqmin	$92,946
4th	Ted Weinstock	$64,727
5th	Tommy Vedes	$47,617
6th	Steve Jelinek	$36,893
7th	Aaron Sias	$30,028
8th	Ronnie Hofman	$25,618
9th	William McMahan	$22,862

=== Event 49: $50,000 World Championship H.O.R.S.E. ===
- 5-Day Event: Friday, June 26 to Tuesday, June 30
- Number of buy-ins: 95
- Total prize pool: $4,560,000
- Number of payouts: 16
- Winning hand: 4♦ 7♦ 6♠ A♣ A♠ Q♥ 9♠ (Razz)

Final table
Place	Name	Prize
1st	David Bach (1/1)	$1,276,802
2nd	John Hanson	$789,199
3rd	Erik Sagström	$522,394
4th	Vitaly Lunkin (1/2)	$368,813
5th	Huck Seed (0/4)	$276,610
6th	Ville Wahlbeck (1/1)	$219,655
7th	Chau Giang (0/3)	$184,087
8th	Erik Seidel (0/8)	$162,382

=== Event 50: $1,500 Limit Hold'em Shootout ===
- 3-Day Event: Friday, June 26 to Sunday, June 28
- Number of buy-ins: 572
- Total prize pool: $779,024
- Number of payouts: 64
- Winning hand: K♦ 5♥

Final table
Place	Name	Prize
1st	Greg Mueller (2/2)	$194,854
2nd	Marc Naalden (1/1)	$120,614
3rd	Millie Shiu	$77,138
4th	David Williams (0/1)	$51,145
5th	Matthew Sterling	$35,058
6th	Flaminio Malaguti	$24,824
7th	Joep Van Den Bijgaart	$18,136
8th	Jose Ignacio "Nacho" Barbero	$13,655

=== Event 51: $1,500 No Limit Hold'em ===
- 3-Day Event: Saturday, June 27 to Monday, June 29
- Number of buy-ins: 2,781
- Total prize pool: $3,796,065
- Number of payouts: 297
- Winning hand: 6♦ 6♣

Final table
Place	Name	Prize
1st	Carsten Joh (1/1)	$664,426
2nd	Andrew Chen	$412,632
3rd	David Walasinski	$272,405
4th	Steven Levy	$192,650
5th	Owen Crowe	$145,199
6th	Thibaut Durand	$115,817
7th	Georgios Kapalas	$97,634
8th	Jason Helder	$86,702
9th	Nathan Page	$80,894

=== Event 52: $3,000 Triple Chance No Limit Hold'em^{[e]} ===
- 3-Day Event: Sunday, June 28 to Tuesday, June 30
- Number of buy-ins: 854
- Total prize pool: $2,357,040
- Number of payouts: 81
- Winning hand: 9♥ 9♦

Final table
Place	Name	Prize
1st	Jörg Peisert (1/1)	$506,800
2nd	Jason DeWitt	$313,227
3rd	Benjamin Gilbert	$205,180
4th	Michael Noda	$142,035
5th	Jason Somerville	$103,591
6th	Michael Katz	$79,385
7th	Karga Holt	$63,781
8th	William Erickson	$53,622
9th	Wes Watson	$47,070

=== Event 53: $1,500 Seven Card Stud Hi-Low-8 or Better ===
- 3-Day Event: Sunday, June 28 to Tuesday, June 30
- Number of buy-ins: 467
- Total prize pool: $637,455
- Number of payouts: 48
- Winning hand: 9♥ 2♠ 4♥ 7♣ K♣ K♦ 4♠

Final table
Place	Name	Prize
1st	David Halpern (1/1)	$159,390
2nd	William Kohler	$98,550
3rd	Max Stern (0/3)	$64,484
4th	Chad Brown	$44,589
5th	Matt Savage	$32,465
6th	Zak Gilbert	$24,828
7th	Brian Swinford	$19,901
8th	Allie Prescott	$16,682

=== Event 54: $1,500 No Limit Hold'em ===
- 3-Day Event: Monday, June 29 to Wednesday, July 1
- Number of buy-ins: 2,818
- Total prize pool: $3,846,570
- Number of payouts: 297
- Winning hand: 9♥ J♣

Final table
Place	Name	Prize
1st	Tony Veckey (1/1)	$673,276
2nd	Jason Wheeler	$418,122
3rd	Joseph Chaplin	$276,029
4th	Sergey Konkin	$195,213
5th	Andrew Malott	$147,131
6th	Christopher Bonita	$117,358
7th	Chris DeMaci	$98,933
8th	David Jaoui	$87,855
9th	Miha Remic	$81,970

=== Event 55: $2,500 2-7 Triple Draw Lowball ===
- 3-Day Event: Monday, June 29 to Wednesday, July 1
- Number of buy-ins: 257
- Total prize pool: $593,400
- Number of payouts: 24
- Winning hand: 7-6-5-3-2

Final table
Place	Name	Prize
1st	Abe Mosseri (1/1)	$165,521
2nd	Masayoshi Tanaka	$102,313
3rd	Julie Schneider	$66,285
4th	John Juanda (0/4)	$44,941
5th	Blair Rodman (0/1)	$31,818
6th	Brad Libson	$23,484

=== Event 56: $5,000 No Limit Hold'em Short Handed ===
- 3-Day Event: Tuesday, June 30 to Thursday, July 2
- Number of buy-ins: 928
- Total prize pool: $4,361,600
- Number of payouts: 90
- Winning hand: J♥ J♦

Final table
Place	Name	Prize
1st	Matt Hawrilenko (1/1)	$1,003,218
2nd	Josh Brikis	$619,609
3rd	Faraz Jaka	$400,526
4th	Sean Keeton	$269,983
5th	Jonas Wexler	$189,555
6th	Matthew Waxman	$138,394

=== Event 57: $10,000 World Championship No Limit Hold'em ===
- 13-Day Event: Friday, July 3 to Wednesday, July 15
- Final Table:^{[f]} Saturday, November 7 to Tuesday, November 10
- Number of buy-ins: 6,494
- Total prize pool: $60,043,650
- Number of payouts: 648
- Winning hand: 9♦ 9♣

Final table
Place	Name	Prize
1st	Joe Cada (1/1)	$8,546,453
2nd	Darvin Moon	$5,182,601
3rd	Antoine Saout	$3,479,485
4th	Eric Buchman	$2,502,787
5th	Jeff Shulman	$1,953,395
6th	Steven Begleiter	$1,587,133
7th	Phil Ivey (2/7)	$1,404,002
8th	Kevin Schaffel	$1,300,228
9th	James Akenhead	$1,263,602
