= 2009 World Series of Poker =

Series of poker tournaments

- Location: Rio All-Suite Hotel and Casino, Las Vegas, Nevada
- Dates: May 27 – July 15

Champion
- (United States) Joe Cada

ESPN's World Series of Poker title screen

The 2009 World Series of Poker was the 40th annual World Series of Poker (WSOP). It was held at the Rio All Suite Hotel and Casino in Las Vegas, Nevada, and ran from May 27 to July 15. There were 57 bracelet events, culminating in the $10,000 No-Limit Hold'em Main Event. The "November Nine" concept returned for the second year, with the finalists of the Main Event returning to finish the tournament on November 7.

== Event schedule ==
#	Event	Entrants	Winner	Prize	Runner-up	Results
1	$500 Casino Employees No Limit Hold'em	866	Andrew Cohen (1/1)	$83,778	Paul Peterson	Results
2	$40,000 No Limit Hold'em	201	Vitaly Lunkin (1/2)	$1,891,012	Isaac Haxton	Results
3	$1,500 Omaha Hi-Low Split-8 or Better	918	Thang Luu (1/2)	$263,135	Ed Smith	Results
4	$1,000 No Limit Hold'em	6,012	Steve Sung (1/1)	$771,106	Peter Vilandos (0/1)	Results
5	$1,500 Pot Limit Omaha	809	Jason Mercier (1/1)	$237,415	Steven Burkholder	Results
6	$10,000 World Championship Seven Card Stud	142	Freddie Ellis (1/1)	$373,744	Eric Drache	Results
7	$1,500 No Limit Hold'em	2,791	Travis Johnson (1/1)	$666,853	Steve Karp	Results
8	$2,500 2-7 Draw Lowball	147	Phil Ivey (1/6)	$96,361	John Monnette	Results
9	$1,500 No Limit Hold'em Short Handed	1,459	Ken Aldridge (1/1)	$428,259	Carman Cavella	Results
10	$2,500 Pot Limit Hold'em/Omaha	453	Rami Boukai (1/1)	$244,862	Najib Bennani	Results
11	$2,000 No Limit Hold'em	1,646	Anthony Harb (1/1)	$569,199	Peter Rho	Results
12	$10,000 World Championship Mixed Event	194	Ville Wahlbeck (1/1)	$492,375	David Chiu (0/4)	Results
13	$2,500 No Limit Hold'em	1,088	Keven Stammen (1/1)	$506,786	Angel Guillen	Results
14	$2,500 Limit Hold'em Short Handed	367	Brock Parker (1/1)	$223,688	Daniel Negreanu (0/4)	Results
15	$5,000 No Limit Hold'em	655	Brian Lemke (1/1)	$692,658	Fabian Quoss	Results
16	$1,500 Seven Card Stud	359	Jeff Lisandro (1/2)	$124,959	Rodney H. Pardey (0/2)	Results
17	$1,000 Ladies No Limit Hold'em World Championship	1,060	Lisa Hamilton (1/1)	$195,390	Lori Bender	Results
18	$10,000 World Championship Omaha Hi-Low Split-8 or Better	179	Daniel Alaei (1/2)	$445,898	Scott Clements (0/2)	Results
19	$2,500 No Limit Hold'em Short Handed	1,068	Brock Parker (2/2)	$552,745	Joe Serock	Results
20	$1,500 Pot Limit Hold'em	633	J.P. Kelly (1/1)	$194,434	Marc Tschirch	Results
21	$3,000 H.O.R.S.E.	452	Zac Fellows (1/1)	$311,899	James Van Alstyne	Results
22	$1,500 No Limit Hold'em Shootout	1,000	Jeff Carris (1/1)	$313,673	Jason Somerville	Results
23	$10,000 World Championship 2-7 Draw Lowball	96	Nick Schulman (1/1)	$279,742	Ville Wahlbeck (1/1)	Results
24	$1,500 No Limit Hold'em	2,506	Peter Vilandos (1/2)	$607,256	Andy Seth	Results
25	$2,500 Omaha/Seven Card Stud Hi-Low-8 or Better	376	Phil Ivey (2/7)	$220,538	Ming Lee	Results
26	$1,500 Limit Hold'em	643	Tomas Alenius (1/1)	$197,488	Jason Tam	Results
27	$5,000 Pot Limit Omaha Hi-Low Split-8 or Better	198	Roland De Wolfe (1/1)	$246,616	Brett Richey	Results
28	$1,500 No Limit Hold'em	2,638	Mike Eise (1/1)	$639,331	Jeff Chang	Results
29	$10,000 World Championship Heads Up No Limit Hold'em	256	Leo Wolpert (1/1)	$625,682	John Duthie	Results
30	$2,500 Pot Limit Omaha	436	J. C. Tran (1/2)	$235,685	Jeff Kimber	Results
31	$1,500 H.O.R.S.E.	770	James Van Alstyne (1/1)	$247,033	Tad Jurgens	Results
32	$2,000 No Limit Hold'em	1,534	Ángel Guillén (1/1)	$530,548	Mika Paasonen	Results
33	$10,000 World Championship Limit Hold'em	185	Greg Mueller (1/1)	$460,836	Pat Pezzin	Results
34	$1,500 No Limit Hold'em	2,095	Eric Baldwin (1/1)	$521,932	Jonas Klausen	Results
35	$5,000 Pot Limit Omaha	363	Richard Austin (1/1)	$409,484	Sorel Mizzi	Results
36	$2,000 No Limit Hold'em	1,695	Jordan Smith (1/1)	$586,212	Ken Lennaárd	Results
37	$10,000 World Championship Seven Card Stud Hi-Low Split-8 or Better	164	Jeff Lisandro (2/3)	$431,656	Farzad Rouhani (0/1)	Results
38	$2,000 Limit Hold'em	446	Marc Naalden (1/1)	$190,770	Steven Cowley	Results
39	$1,500 No Limit Hold'em	2,715	Ray Foley (1/1)	$657,969	Brandon Cantu (0/1)	Results
40	$10,000 World Championship Pot Limit Omaha	295	Matt Graham (1/2)	$679,379	Vitaly Lunkin (1/2)	Results
41	$5,000 No Limit Hold'em Shootout	280	Péter Traply (1/1)	$348,728	Andrew Lichtenberger	Results
42	$2,500 Mixed Event	412	Jerrod Ankenman (1/1)	$241,637	Sergey Altbregin	Results
43	$1,000 Seniors No Limit Hold'em World Championship	2,707	Michael Davis (1/1)	$437,358	Scott Buller	Results
44	$2,500 Razz	315	Jeff Lisandro (3/4)	$188,370	Michael Craig	Results
45	$10,000 World Championship Pot Limit Hold'em	275	John Kabbaj (1/1)	$633,335	Kirill Gerasimov	Results
46	$2,500 Omaha Hi-Low Split-8 or Better	424	Derek Raymond (1/1)	$229,192	Mark Tenner	Results
47	$2,500 Mixed Hold'em	527	Bahador Ahmadi (1/1)	$278,804	John McGuiness	Results
48	$1,500 Pot Limit Omaha Hi-Low Split-8 or Better	762	Brandon Cantu (1/2)	$228,867	Lee Watkinson	Results
49	$50,000 World Championship H.O.R.S.E.	95	David Bach (1/1)	$1,276,802	John Hanson	Results
50	$1,500 Limit Hold'em Shootout	572	Greg Mueller (2/2)	$194,854	Marc Naalden (1/1)	Results
51	$1,500 No Limit Hold'em	2,781	Carsten Joh (1/1)	$664,426	Andrew Chen	Results
52	$3,000 Triple Chance No Limit Hold'em	854	Jorg Peisert (1/1)	$506,800	Jason DeWitt	Results
53	$1,500 Seven Card Stud Hi-Low-8 or Better	467	David Halpern (1/1)	$159,390	William Kohler	Results
54	$1,500 No Limit Hold'em	2,818	Tony Veckey (1/1)	$673,276	Jason Wheeler	Results
55	$2,500 2-7 Triple Draw Lowball	257	Abe Mosseri (1/1)	$165,521	Masayoshi Tanaka	Results
56	$5,000 No Limit Hold'em Short Handed	928	Matt Hawrilenko (1/1)	$1,003,163	Josh Brikis	Results
57	$10,000 World Championship No Limit Hold'em	6,494	Joe Cada (1/1)	$8,547,042	Darvin Moon	Results

== Main Event ==
The $10,000 World Championship No Limit Texas Hold 'em Main Event began on July 3 with the first of four starting days. There were 6,494 total entries. After reaching the final table of nine players on July 15, the final table was once again delayed until November 7. The Main Event once again was a draw for many celebrities to play including:

- Day 1A: Jason Alexander, Brad Garrett, Orel Hershiser, Nelly, Jennifer Tilly,
- Day 1B: Shane Warne
- Day 1C: Antonio Tarver, Paul Wight
- Day 1D: Shannon Elizabeth, Sully Erna, Jordan Farmar, Audley Harrison, Scott Ian, Lou Diamond Phillips, Ray Romano, John Salley, Nate Silver, Sam Simon, Marlon Wayans, Torrie Wilson

The highest number of participants for a single day was Day 1D at 2,809, with Day 1B the lowest with 873. According to news reports, as many as 500 players, including Patrik Antonius, T. J. Cloutier, Layne Flack and Ted Forrest, were denied entry because capacity was filled.

Players started with 30,000 chips, up from 20,000 in previous Main Events.

=== Performance of past champions ===
Name	Championship Year(s)	Day of Elimination
Amarillo Slim	1972	2A
Doyle Brunson	1976 and 1977	1B
Bobby Baldwin	1978	5 (352nd)
Tom McEvoy	1983	1C
Berry Johnston	1986	2A
Johnny Chan	1987 and 1988	2A
Phil Hellmuth	1989	4 (436th)
Jim Bechtel	1993	3
Dan Harrington	1995	5 (252nd)
Huck Seed	1996	1D
Scotty Nguyen	1998	2B
Chris Ferguson	2000	4 (561st)
Carlos Mortensen	2001	3
Robert Varkonyi	2002	2B
Chris Moneymaker	2003	1B
Greg Raymer	2004	3
Joe Hachem	2005	6 (103rd)
Jamie Gold	2006	1C
Jerry Yang	2007	1A
Peter Eastgate	2008	6 (78th)

=== Other notable high finishes ===
NB: This list is restricted to top 100 finishers with an existing Wikipedia entry.

Place	Name	Prize
14th	Ben Lamb	$633,022
18th	Andrew Lichtenberger	$500,557
21st	Jonathan Tamayo	$352,832
24th	Antonio Esfandiari	$352,832
39th	Eugene Katchalov	$178,857
45th	Dennis Phillips	$178,857
56th	Joe Sebok	$108,047
64th	Prahlad Friedman	$90,344
78th	Peter Eastgate	$68,979

=== November Nine ===
As in 2008, the final nine players returned on November 7 to complete the event. These players were as follows:

Name	Number of chips (percentage of total)	WSOP Bracelets	WSOP Cashes*	WSOP Earnings*
(United States) Darvin Moon	58,930,000 (30.2%)	0	0	$0
(United States) Eric Buchman	34,800,000 (17.9%)	0	9	$320,893
(United States) Steven Begleiter	29,885,000 (15.3%)	0	0	$0
(United States) Jeff Shulman	19,580,000 (10.0%)	0	15	$289,551
(United States) Joe Cada	13,215,000 (6.8%)	0	2	$28,214
(United States) Kevin Schaffel	12,390,000 (6.4%)	0	2	$92,166
(United States) Phil Ivey	9,765,000 (5.0%)	7	38	$3,843,018
(France) Antoine Saout	9,500,000 (4.9%)	0	0	$0
(United Kingdom) James Akenhead	6,800,000 (3.5%)	0	2	$525,867

*Career statistics prior to the beginning of the 2009 Main Event.

Harrah's deposited the remaining prizepool of $15,847,250 into a risk-free interest-bearing account back on July 16, 2009, up until November 2, 2009. This was the total money left over in the prize pool after each member of the November Nine was paid out ninth-place money ($1,263,602). The remaining money accrued $1,321 in interest and was distributed throughout the payouts. The 2009 final table lasted for 364 hands, including 88 hands of heads up play.

==== Final table ====
Place	Name	Prize
1st	Joe Cada	$8,547,042
2nd	Darvin Moon	$5,182,928
3rd	Antoine Saout	$3,479,670
4th	Eric Buchman	$2,502,890
5th	Jeff Shulman	$1,953,452
6th	Steven Begleiter	$1,587,160
7th	Phil Ivey	$1,404,014
8th	Kevin Schaffel	$1,300,231
9th	James Akenhead	$1,263,602

== Notable achievements ==
- Jeff Lisandro became the first player to win a bracelet in each of the Stud disciplines in the same World Series. In doing so, Lisandro was the first player to win three WSOP bracelets in the same year since Phil Ivey achieved this feat in 2002.
- In addition to Lisandro, Ivey, Brock Parker and Greg Mueller won multiple bracelets during the series.
- Ville Wahlbeck, who won Event 12, became the first Finnish player to win a bracelet.
- Péter Traply, who won Event 41, became the first Hungarian player to win a bracelet.
