= 2008–09 World Series of Poker Circuit =

American poker tournaments

The 2008–09 World Series of Poker Circuit is the 5th annual World Series of Poker Circuit. The games were "played around the United States at Harrah’s owned casinos throughout the year."

== Event schedule ==
Date	Location	Winner	Prize	Runner-up	Other Finalists
October 14, 2008	Horseshoe Southern Indiana	Samuel Oberlin	$143,064	Jerry Martin	David Kopacz; Len Ashby; Joey Couden; Jamin Stokes; Derek Whelan; Dean Schultz; Ray Lynn
November 2, 2008	Harrahs Horseshoe Casino Hammond	Steve Billirakis	$208,885	Thomas Koral	Gary Leibovitz; Kyle Schertz; George Dietz; Sameer Al-Dbhany; Ravi Raghavan; Jason DeWitt; Dustin Woolf
November 16, 2008	Harveys Resort & Casino, Lake Tahoe	Michael Binger	$181,379	Ty Stewart	Jake Solis; Mike McClain; Tay Nguyen; Allen Kessler; Travis Erdman; Bill Bostick; Scott Clements
December 16, 2008	Harrah's Atlantic City	Brent Roberts	$280,940	Phillip Reed	Kyle Bowker; Robert McLaughlin; Allen Bari; Tim Kelly; Dwyte Pilgrim; Scott Zakheim; Rafael Camejo
February 2, 2009	Harrah's Casino Tunica	Kai Landry	$183,974	David Dao	Matthew Stout; Leonard Eidson; Jeremy Byrum; Mike Leah; Glenn Hyde; Brian McCoy; Frank Wyville
February 25, 2009	Horseshoe Council Bluffs	Jesse Hale	$113,020	Dennis Meierotto	John McDonald; Evan Panesis; Joaquin Sosa; Alan Engel; Jeff Banghart; Jeff Bryan; Jeff Daubs
March 14, 2009	Caesars Atlantic City	Samuel Chartier	$322,944	John Nixon	Francis Vizza; Michael Michnik; Alex Bolotin; Matt Brady; Jason Young; Chris Klodnicki; David Zeitlin
April 1, 2009	Harrah's Rincon San Diego	Dwyte Pilgrim	$125,775	Esther Taylor	Charles Williams; Christopher Tryba; Thao Thiem; Josh Prager; Pogos Simityan; John McGowan; John Farrell
April 30, 2009	Caesars Palace	Justin Bonomo	$227,692	Michael Mizrachi	Men Nguyen; Jeremiah Degreef; Matt Graham; Dwyte Pilgrim; Jack Schanbacher; Nashaat Antonious; Evgeny Serebryakov
May 20, 2009	Harrah's New Orleans	Jean Gaspard	$211,722	Billy Kopp	Ken Christopher; Steven McKoy; Daniel Walsh; Anita Vasquez; Justin Allen; Kenny Milam; Kurt Scheer
