= Thomas Keller (disambiguation) =

Thomas Keller (born 1955) is an American chef.

Thomas Keller is also the name of:

- Thomas Keller (card game player) (born 1980), American professional poker player
- Thomas Keller (rower) (1924–1989), president of Féderation Internationale des Sociétés d'Aviron (FISA), the governing body of international rowing
  - Thomas Keller Medal, award for an outstanding international career in the sport of rowing named after Thomas Keller
- Thomas Keller (footballer) (born 1999), German footballer
