= Abe Mosseri =

American poker player (born 1974)

- Nickname: EazyPeazy
- Born: Abraham Mosseri; June 21, 1974 (age 52); Brooklyn, New York, U.S.

World Series of Poker
- Bracelets: 2
- Final tables: 9
- Money finishes: 16
- Highest WSOP Main Event finish: 120th, 2004

World Poker Tour
- Final table: 1
- Money finishes: 5

Abraham Mosseri (born June 21, 1974, in Brooklyn, New York) is an American professional backgammon and poker player from New York City, New York, who won the 2009 World Series of Poker $2,500 2-7 Triple Draw Lowball event.

== Poker career ==
Primarily known as a high-stakes cash game specialist, Mosseri has played with Doyle Brunson, Barry Greenstein, and Jennifer Harman in the Big Game at the Bellagio with stakes as high as $4,000/$8,000. Online, Mosseri played high-stakes cash games at Full Tilt Poker under the screen name EazyPeazy.

Mosseri has appeared in televised poker games, including on the PokerStars.net Big Game (Season 1, Weeks 2 and 12).

=== World Series Poker ===
In the 2009 World Series of Poker (WSOP), Mosseri won the $2,500 2-7 Triple Draw Lowball event, earning $165,521. He also made final tables at the 2009 WSOP $10,000 World Championship Seven Card Stud Hi-Low Split-8 or Better event, finishing 7th, and the 2010 World Series of Poker $10,000 Omaha Hi-Low Split-8 or Better Championship event, where he finished 8th.

==== World Series of Poker bracelets ====
Year	Event	Prize Money
2009	$2,500 2-7 Triple Draw Lowball	$165,521
2017	$10,000 Omaha Hi-Lo 8 or Better Championship	$388,795

=== World Poker Tour ===
Mosseri has five cashes at the World Poker Tour including one final table in WPT Season II at the Five Diamond World Poker Classic, where he finished in fourth place, cashing for $174,585.

As of 2017, his live tournament winnings exceed $2,100,000.
