= Jeff Lisandro =

Italo-Australian poker player

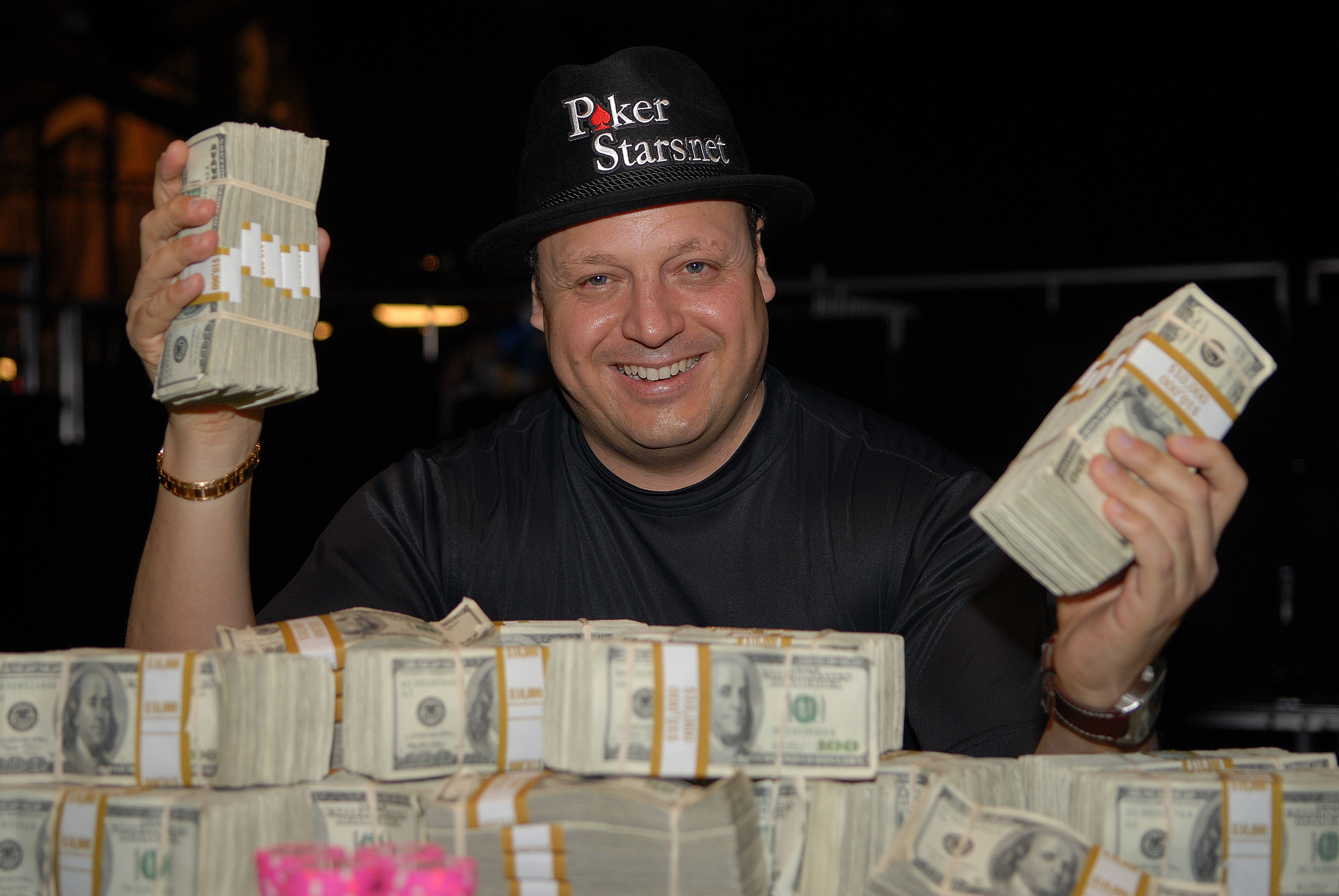
- Lisandro after winning the $2,000 seven-card stud event at the 2007 World Series of Poker
- Nickname: Iceman

World Series of Poker
- Bracelets: 6
- Money finishes: 68
- Highest WSOP Main Event finish: 17th, 2006

World Poker Tour
- Title: None
- Final table: None
- Money finishes: 2

European Poker Tour
- Title: None
- Final table: 1
- Money finishes: 2

Jeffrey Lisandro (born in Perth) is an Italian Australian professional poker player, now residing in Salerno, Italy.

Lisandro is known as a cash game specialist, but he also plays often in the poker tournament circuit and is regarded as one of the premier Seven Card Stud players in the world.

At the 2009 World Series of Poker, he became the first person to win a World Series title in all three seven-card stud disciplines in the same year, when he won tournaments in Stud High, Stud High-Low, and Razz, earning him the Player of the Year title.

== Poker career ==
Growing up near Salerno, Italy, Lisandro's mother taught him how to play poker at the age of five.

Lisandro made his first final table appearance in a World Series of Poker event in 1997, in the $3,000 pot limit hold'em event won by Phil Hellmuth Jr. He has made eleven WSOP final tables since then, in Omaha, Seven-Card Stud and 2 to 7 Lowball events and has won five bracelets, two in Seven-Card Stud, one in Seven-Card Stud Hi/Low, one in Razz, and one in Pot-Limit Omaha.

Lisandro has not yet made a final table on the World Poker Tour (WPT), but has finished in the money in two events.

In December 2004, Lisandro won the $25,000 limit hold'em heads-up tournament, defeating Howard Lederer in the final to take home the $194,000 grand prize.

In May 2005, he won the $10,000 no limit hold'em World Series of Poker circuit event at Lake Tahoe, defeating Phil Ivey in the final heads-up confrontation to win the $542,360 prize.

Lisandro finished 17th in the 2006 World Series of Poker Main Event, winning $659,730. He was also noted for an incident with Prahlad Friedman during the event, where Friedman felt that Lisandro had not put in his ante, worth 5,000 chips, in a hand. (In posting one of the blinds, a third player at the table forgot to put in his ante; the dealer corrected his mistake.) Friedman brought it up constantly through the hand, with the dealer telling him to stop bringing it up. Friedman would not stop, and called Lisandro a "thief". Lisandro was very upset to hear that, and argued with Friedman, telling him he would "take his head off". Friedman tried to settle things with Lisandro afterwards during play, but Lisandro refused to talk to him. However, there was one light moment at the table when another player, after learning that Lisandro was from Italy, said his wife was also from Italy and that he and his wife planned to travel there to visit her parents. Lisandro asked him, "Can you take him [Friedman] with you?"

Lisandro won his first World Series of Poker bracelet in 2007 in the $2,000 Seven-Card Stud event beating a final table that included Daniel Negreanu and Nick Frangos. He placed 2nd in the World Championship Pot Limit Hold'em (Event 13) in 2007. He won $294,620 as the runner-up to Allen Cunningham.

In 2009, Lisandro won the World Series of Poker Player of the Year award. He was also inducted into the Australian Poker Hall of Fame that same year.

At the 2014 World Series of Poker Asia Pacific, Lisandro won his sixth bracelet in Event #3: A$1,650 Pot Limit Omaha, earning A$51,660.

As of 2023, his total live tournament winnings exceed $5,800,000.

== World Series of Poker bracelets ==
Year	Event	Prize Money
2007	$2,000 Seven-Card Stud	$118,426
2009	$1,500 Seven-Card Stud	$124,959
2009	$10,000 World Championship Seven-Card Stud-8 or better	$431,656
2009	$2,500 Razz	$188,370
2010E	£5,250 Pot-Limit Omaha	£159,514
2014A	A$1,650 Pot Limit Omaha	A$51,660

An "E" following a year denotes bracelet(s) won at the World Series of Poker Europe
An "A" following a year denotes bracelet(s) won at the World Series of Poker Asia Pacific
