= Michael Shulman (writer) =

American writer (born 1973)

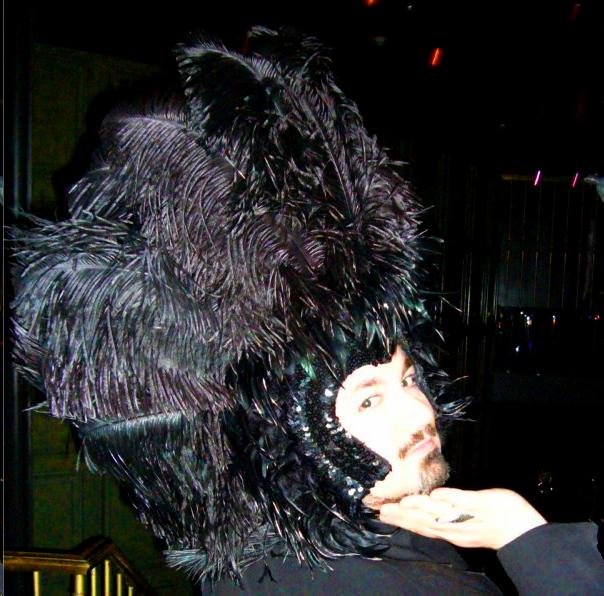
- Shulman in a black showgirl head-dress. Taken at Amy Sacco's 40th Birthday Party at Body English at Hard Rock Hotel and Casino (Las Vegas) (2008). Photo by Donna D'Cruz of Rasa Music.
- Born: April 28, 1973 (age 53); Seattle, WA, US
- Occupations: Writer, philanthropist, pop culture expert

Michael Shulman (born April 28, 1973) is an American writer, artist, and pop culture expert, residing in Las Vegas, Nevada.

== Early life and family ==
Shulman was born in Seattle, Washington to Jan Shulman, an artist, and Barry Shulman, CEO of CardPlayer Magazine and American poker player. Shulman has one brother, Jeff Shulman, an American poker player and current editor of CardPlayer Magazine and its ancillary publications in Europe, Asia, Latin and South America, and Scandinavia, as well as the website, CardPlayer.com.

Michael's family traveled extensively during the brothers' childhoods, having made cross-country moves from Seattle, WA to Scarsdale, NY, then back to Seattle, WA, then to New York, NY, then to Newport Beach, CA, and back to Seattle, WA – all by the time Shulman was in 5th Grade. Shulman attended the Lakeside School (Seattle, WA), Choate Rosemary Hall (Wallingford, CT), Tulane University (New Orleans, LA), and University of Arizona (Tucson, AZ), where in 1995 he graduated with a BA in Media and Popular Culture with a Minor Concentration in Merchandising, Fashion, and Consumer Studies.

== Personal life ==
Shulman was entered into a Domestic Partnership with Jacob Mitchell, an expert on archival vintage designer fashion and accessories. The couple was legally partnered by Nevada Secretary of State Ross Miller on October 10, 2010. Their partnership was dissolved in 2013.

== Work as a DJ ==
Shulman began DJing in his youth. By the age of 14, he was spinning music for the bi-weekly dances, at his prep school, Choate Rosemary Hall. Shulman spun his singular style of music (described as "New York VIP Room/Lounge Music") at a host of Las Vegas venues such as Rain Nightclub and Ghostbar at the Palms Casino Resort, Light and Caramel at Bellagio, and JET at The Mirage; as well as national venues such as New York's Bungalow 8 and Man Ray, as well as Honolulu's Diamond Head Grill.

Shulman has DJed private events for A-list companies and clients including Christian Dior, Emilio Pucci, Lanvin, Tod's, Vanity Fair, BlackBook, Dom Pérignon, Tommy Hilfiger, Wynn Las Vegas, DKNY, Elie Tahari, Vogue, Neiman Marcus, UGG and Shanghai Tang. Shulman was also selected to DJ a pre-Emmys party thrown by Los Angeles Confidential for actress Kyra Sedgwick.

== Written works ==
Shulman is a published writer whose fields of expertise include: luxury lifestyles, travel, popular culture, and Las Vegas. His work has appeared in several magazines and periodicals including PAPER, BlackBook, Ocean Drive, CardPlayer Magazine, 944, Vegas Seven, BPM, VEGAS Magazine, Los Angeles Confidential, and Gotham Magazine.

Concurrently, over a six-year period, Shulman served in various roles, including contributing writer, contributing editor, and pop culture editor for VEGAS Magazine, where his longtime "Diva Las Vegas" column enjoyed a cult-like popularity.

In 2009, Shulman rolled-out his online magazine ShulmanSays.

== Shulman as a pop culture expert ==
Shulman has been quoted in Departures and in The New York Times (in the Sunday Styles section, and the Sunday Travel section). Additionally, Shulman has appeared on several TV shows and miniseries, such as Travel Channel's Vegas Revolution, 21 Sinful Vegas Hotspots, and VH1's I Love the New Millennium.

== Art and photography ==
Shulman is an accomplished photographer and artist. His work has been sold at auction at Christie's and Phillips de Pury & Co. and can be found in the collections of Tom Breitling, Greg Calejo and Thom Filicia, Donna D'Cruz and Tom Silverman, Sir Elton John and David Furnish, Camille and Larry Ruvo, Amy Sacco, Alison Sarofim, Amy Sedaris, and Reagan Silber among others. Shulman's technique involves transferring his photography onto large-format canvas and then enhancing the canvas with Make-up Art Cosmetics/M۰A۰C Cosmetics.

Shulman's first solo exhibit, Beauty from Above, included a dozen of Shulman's signature painted photos on canvas featuring perspectives of Las Vegas chandeliers.

== Philanthropy ==
Shulman is an active philanthropist in Las Vegas and nationwide, via his position as Vice President of the Shulman Family Foundation. He's also an active supporter and adviser to such charities as After School All Stars, Communities in Schools, Free Arts NYC, Human Rights Campaign, Nathan Adelson Hospice, Make-a-Wish Foundation, Opportunity Village, Patrick Kelly Youth Foundation, and Keep Memory Alive for the Cleveland Clinic Lou Ruvo Center for Brain Health.

Shulman was presented the key to Las Vegas by Mayor Oscar Goodman on October 29, 2009.
