= Peter Vilandos =

Greek-American poker player (died 2022)

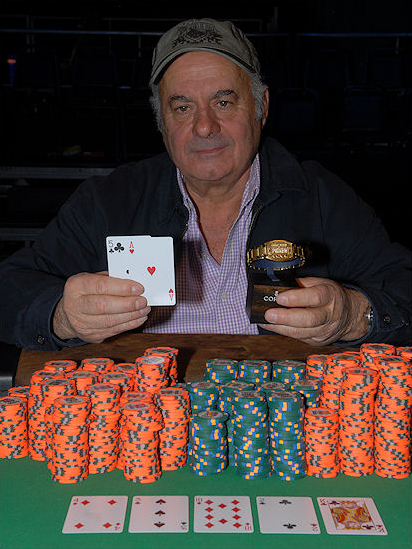

World Series of Poker
- Bracelets: 3
- Final tables: 8
- Money finishes: 21
- Highest WSOP Main Event finish: 21st, 1996

World Poker Tour
- Title: None
- Final table: None
- Money finishes: 3

Peter Vilandos (died July 24, 2022) was a Greek-American professional poker player. He was born in Greece and then resided in Houston, Texas. He won three bracelets at the World Series of Poker (WSOP).

Vilandos had his first cash in the WSOP in 1993, and won his first WSOP bracelet in 1995 in the $1,500 Pot Limit Holdem event. He had his highest WSOP Main Event finish the following year, busting out in 21st place, for a prize of $19,500.

Vilandos also cashed in two World Poker Tour (WPT) $10,000 events. His first cash was in 2002 at the Five Diamond World Poker Classic, finishing in 15th place. He cashed again in 2003 at the World Poker Open in Tunica, Mississippi, finishing in 21st place.

Vilandos won his second bracelet at the 2009 WSOP, winning a $1,500 No Limit Holdem event and a prize of $607,256. Earlier in the series, Vilandos had a second-place finish in the $1,000 No Limit Hold'em event, which was won by Steve Sung.

Vilandos won his third bracelet at the 2014 WSOP, winning a $5,000 No Limit Hold'em event for a prize of $952,694.

Vilandos's live lifetime tournament winnings were $3,266,764. His 22 cashes at the WSOP account for $2,410,333 of those winnings.

Vilandos died on July 24, 2022.

== World Series of Poker Bracelets ==
Year	Tournament	Prize (US$)
1995	$1,500 Pot Limit Hold'em	$148,500
2009	$1,500 No Limit Hold'em	$607,256
2012	$5,000 No Limit Hold'em	$952,694
