= John Kabbaj =

English poker player (born 1973)

- Nickname: Large

World Series of Poker
- Bracelets: 2
- Money finishes: 22
- Highest WSOP Main Event finish: 281st, 2010

European Poker Tour
- Title: None
- Final table: 1
- Money finishes: 3

Jean-Michel (John) Kabbaj (born 19 June 1973 in Birmingham, Warwickshire) is an English professional poker player, referred to by The Hendon Mob as their unofficial fifth member.

== Before poker ==
Kabbaj quit school at the age of 16. He worked as a builder and was later employed at Heathrow Airport.

== Poker career ==
=== Tournaments ===
Kabbaj became a professional poker player in 1995, after winning his first major tournament at the Main Event of the 1995 Christmas Cracker tournament in London. He defeated a field including Dave Gardner (father of Julian Gardner) and Ram Vaswani to take home the £14,750 first prize.

Kabbaj made his first money finish in the World Series of Poker (WSOP) in 1999, finishing 9th in the $3,000 pot limit hold'em event won by Layne Flack. He finished above several notable players, including Eli Elezra, Lucy Rokach, John Bonetti, and Paul Phillips.

In 2000, Kabbaj made his one and only appearance on the popular Late Night Poker television series. He finished 7th in a competitive heat including Charalambos Xanthos, Peter Evans and Victoria Coren. Kabbaj went on to win tournaments in London and Moscow during 2001.

At the 2004 WSOP, Kabbaj finished as the runner-up in the $3,000 no limit hold'em tournament. He won $260,520 for his finish, and was ahead of numerous players including Ram Vaswani, Paul Phillips, Amir Vahedi, John Juanda, Annie Duke, Martin de Knijff, Johnny Chan and Surinder Sunar.

In late 2004, Kabbaj also made the final table of the first European Poker Tour event in Barcelona.

During 2005 he made four money finishes in the WSOP.

He won his first bracelet at the 2009 WSOP, although the achievement was overshadowed by a row involving the bracelet ceremony. Instead of playing the British national anthem God Save The Queen, the Sex Pistols song of the same name was played, much to Kabbaj's disgust.

At the 2014 WSOP, Kabbaj won the $2,500 Omaha/Seven Card Stud Hi/Lo event, defeating Thomas Keller heads-up to earn $267,327 and his second career bracelet.

== World Series of Poker bracelets ==
Year	Tournament	Prize (US$)
2009	$10,000 World Championship Pot Limit Hold'em	$633,335
2014	$2,500 Omaha/Seven Card Stud Hi/Lo	$267,327

As of 2014, his total live tournament winnings exceed $2,700,000.
