= Vitaly Lunkin =

Russian poker player (born 1971)

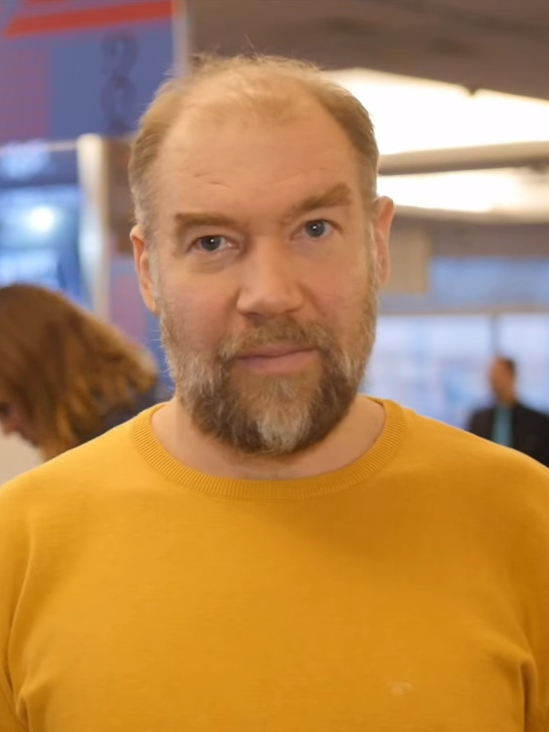
- Lunkin in 2015
- Born: 7 May 1971 (age 55); Moscow, Russia

World Series of Poker
- Bracelets: 2
- Final tables: 6
- Money finishes: 32
- Highest WSOP Main Event finish: 46th, 2013

World Poker Tour
- Title: None
- Final table: None
- Money finish: None

European Poker Tour
- Title: 1
- Final tables: 3
- Money finishes: 6

Vitaly Lunkin (born 7 May 1971) is a Russian professional poker player from Moscow, Russia who has won two World Series of Poker bracelets.

Vitaly Lunkin started playing at the WSOP in 2006, finishing 829th in the Main Event. In 2008, he won his first bracelet, winning the $1,500 No Limit Hold'em event and earning $629,417. The following year, he won his second bracelet and $1,891,018 in the 2009 $40,000 No Limit Hold'em and finished second to Matt Graham in the $10,000 World Championship Pot-limit Omaha event for $419,832.

== World Series of Poker Bracelets ==
Year	Tournament	Prize (US$)
2008	$1,500 No Limit Hold'em	$629,417
2009	$40,000 No Limit Hold'em - 40th Anniversary event	$1,891,018

== Other poker activities ==
Lunkin works as a professional poker trainer and coach in Moscow. He is a previous winner of the Russian Poker Tour - Moscow, and of the European Poker Tour - Barcelona Super High Roller for over $1 million. As of 2024, his total live tournament winnings exceed $6,400,000.
