= Eric Baldwin =

American poker player

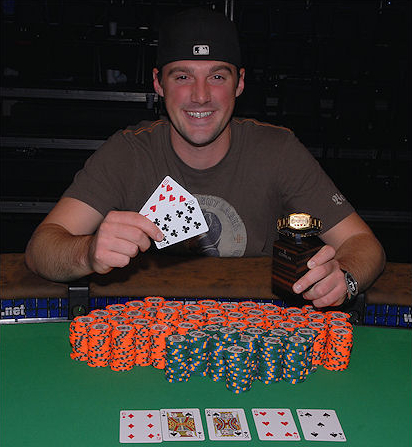
- Baldwin after winning the $1,500 No-Limit Hold'em event at the 2009 World Series of Poker.
- Nickname: basebaldy

World Series of Poker
- Bracelets: 2
- Final tables: 7
- Money finishes: 59
- Highest WSOP Main Event finish: 59th, 2010

World Poker Tour
- Title: None
- Final table: 1
- Money finishes: 6

European Poker Tour
- Title: None
- Final table: None
- Money finish: 1

Eric Baldwin (born in Beaver Dam, Wisconsin) is a professional poker player from Henderson, Nevada who won the 2009 World Series of Poker $1,500 No Limit Hold'em event earning $521,991 and was the runner-up in the World Poker Tour $25,000 No Limit Hold'em WPT Championship Event, earning $1,034,715 and is the 2009 Winner of the CardPlayer Player of the Year Award.

Baldwin finished in 59th place out of 7,319 players that enter in the 2010 World Series of Poker Main Event, earning $138,285.

As of 2025, his total live tournament winnings exceed $9,200,000.

== World Series of Poker bracelet ==
Year	Event	Prize Money
2009	$1,500 No Limit Hold'em	$521,991
2018	$1,500 No Limit Hold'em	$319,580
