= Brandon Cantu =

American poker player (born 1981)

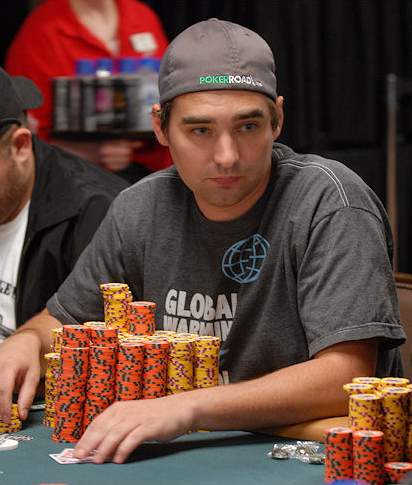
- Cantu at the 2008 World Series of Poker
- Nickname: The Bounty Hunter
- Born: May 10, 1981 (age 45)

World Series of Poker
- Bracelets: 2
- Money finishes: 71
- Highest WSOP Main Event finish: 20th, 2008
- Game Information
- Role: Bounty Hunter
- Platform: Console
- Genre: First Person Shooter

Brandon M. Cantu (born May 10, 1981, in Vancouver, Washington) is an American professional poker player. Upon winning a World Series of Poker bracelet in 2006, Cantu relocated to Las Vegas, Nevada. On March 14, 2007, Cantu became one of only 27 players to ever win both a World Series of Poker bracelet (2006) and a World Poker Tour championship (2008).

== World Series of Poker ==
At the $1,500 No-Limit hold’em event in June 2006, Cantu won his first WSOP bracelet in a $1,500 No Limit Hold'em event, winning $757,839.

At the 2008 WSOP Main Event, Cantu finished in 20th place out of 6,844 entries, earning $257,334.

At the 2009 World Series of Poker, Cantu won his second bracelet in the $1,500 Pot-limit Omaha eight-or-better event, defeating fellow poker professional Lee Watkinson in heads-up play, and winning $228,867.

At the 2012 World Series of Poker Europe, Cantu took second in the 10K Mix Max losing to J.C. Aguilar.

=== World Series of Poker Bracelets ===
Year	Tournament	Prize (US$)
2006	$1,500 No Limit Hold'em	$757,839
2009	$1,500 Pot-Limit Omaha Eight-or-Better	$228,867

== World Poker Tour ==
Cantu has four cashes at the World Poker Tour (WPT) including finishing 18th place at the Festa Al Lago V in 2006 and 19th place at the World Poker Challenge in 2007, then in March 2008, he won his first WPT title at the Bay 101 Shooting Star championship earning $1,000,000 and was nicknamed "The Bounty Hunter" for earning an additional $30,000 in bounties for busting a record six notable poker professionals in the tournament known as "Shooting Stars" who along with their $5000 bounties they also relinquish a custom made t-shirt with that particular players image on it, Cantu's six bounties were; Bill Edler, John Juanda, Phil Laak, Joe Hachem who finished 20th, J. C. Tran who just missed the six person final table in 7th and Jennifer Harman who finished 3rd, also making the final table were non-designated pros John Phan (6th), Noah Jefferson (4th) and runner-up Steve Sung.

As of 2023, his total live tournament winnings exceed $4,600,000. His 10 cashes at the WSOP account for $1,693,509 of those winnings.
