= Greg Mueller =

German and Canadian ice hockey and poker player (born 1971)

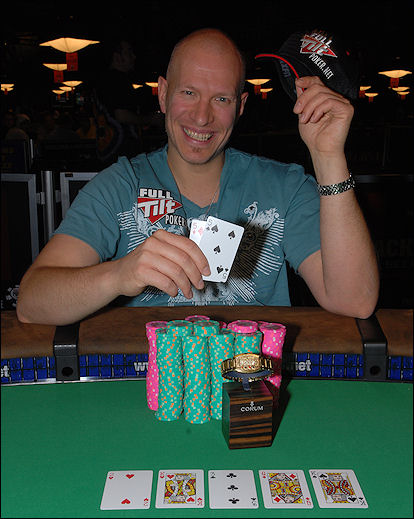
- Mueller after winning Event #33 of the 2009 World Series of Poker
- Nickname: FBT (Full Blown Tilt)
- Born: June 2, 1971 (age 55); Schaffhausen, Switzerland

World Series of Poker
- Bracelets: 3
- Money finishes: 72
- Highest WSOP Main Event finish: 3rd, 2026

World Poker Tour
- Title: None
- Final tables: 2
- Money finishes: 10

Greg Mueller
- Height: 1.95 m (6 ft 5 in)
- Weight: 97 kg (214 lb; 15 st 4 lb)
- Position: Defence
- Shot: Left
- Played for: DEL; Maddogs München; Ratinger Löwen; EC Hannover; 2nd Bundesliga; EHC Trier; Braunlager EHC/Harz; EV Duisburg
- Playing career: 1992–2000

Greg Mueller (born June 2, 1971) is a German and Canadian professional poker player and former professional ice hockey defenceman.

Mueller was born in Schaffhausen, Switzerland. He began playing professional ice hockey in 1992 and played his entire career in Germany, playing in the Eishockey-Bundesliga for EC Hedos München and the Deutsche Eishockey Liga for Maddogs München and Ratinger Löwen.

Mueller was drawn to poker after one of many long road trips during his hockey career. After retiring from hockey, he decided to take the game more seriously and began playing in tournaments. Since then, Mueller has cashed in many poker tournaments throughout his poker career.

Mueller won his first World Series of Poker title in 2009 in the $10,000 limit Texas hold'em championship. Mueller won his second World Series of Poker bracelet and $194,909 only 11 days after his first in a $1,500 Limit Hold'em Shootout event. He won his third in the $10,000 H.O.R.S.E. championship at the 2019 WSOP. At the 2026 WSOP Main Event, Mueller finished third, winning $3,750,000.

His best showing in the World Poker Tour was a fourth-place finish in the 2006 World Poker Challenge, where he won $142,285.

As of 2026, his total live tournament winnings exceed $7,275,000.

== World Series of Poker Bracelets ==
Year	Tournament	Prize (US$)
2009	$10,000 Limit Hold'em	$460,841
2009	$1,500 Limit Hold'em Shootout	$194,854
2019	$10,000 H.O.R.S.E.	$425,347
