= Eric Buchman =

American poker player

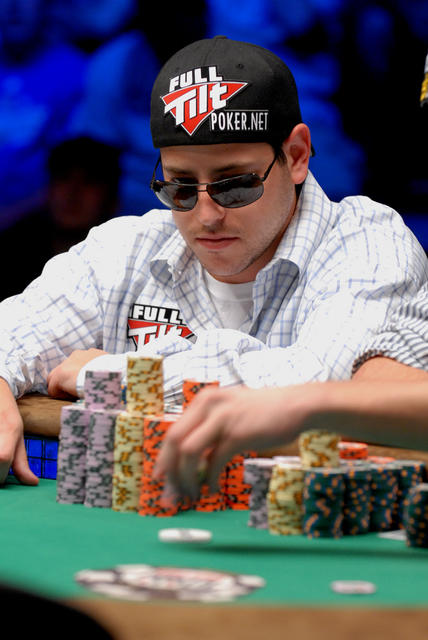
- Buchman at the 2009 World Series of Poker
- Born: September 11, 1979 (age 47)

World Series of Poker
- Bracelets: 2
- Final tables: 10
- Money finishes: 37
- Highest WSOP Main Event finish: 4th, 2009

World Poker Tour
- Title: None
- Final table: None
- Money finishes: 11

European Poker Tour
- Title: None
- Final table: None
- Money finish: 1

Eric Buchman (born September 11, 1979) is an American professional poker player from Valley Stream, New York, who finished in fourth place at the 2009 World Series of Poker Main Event. The following year, at the 2010 World Series of Poker, Buchman won his first bracelet in the $2,000 Limit Hold'em event, earning $203,607.

== Career ==
Buchman finished in fourth place in the 2009 World Series of Poker Main Event on November 7 of that year. He part of the second group of players known as the "November Nine". Buchman has nine previous WSOP cashes, including a 2nd-place finish in the Limit Hold'em event in 2006 and a 6th-place finish in the Omaha/Seven Card Stud Hi-Low-8 or Better event in 2009. He also had a runner-up finish at the WSOP Circuit event in December 2007.

As of 2025, his total live tournament earnings have exceeded $4,400,000. Buchman made a deep run in the 2012 WSOP Main Event, finishing 74th.

=== World Series of Poker bracelets ===
Year	Event	Prize Money
2010	$2,000 Limit Hold'em	$203,607
2014	$1,500 Seven-Card Stud	$118,785
