= Brock Parker =

American poker player (born 1981)

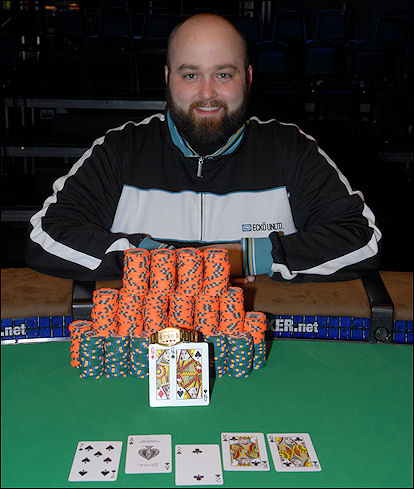
- Parker at the 2009 World Series of Poker
- Nickname: t_soprano
- Born: August 15, 1981 (age 45)

World Series of Poker
- Bracelets: 3
- Money finishes: 37
- Highest WSOP Main Event finish: 178th, 2007

World Poker Tour
- Title: None
- Final table: None
- Money finishes: 2

John Brock Parker (born August 15, 1981) is a professional poker player from Silver Spring, Maryland. At the 2009 World Series of Poker, he won two WSOP bracelets. First, he defeated Daniel Negreanu heads-up to win a $2,500 limit Texas hold 'em short-handed event. Just four days later, he won his second bracelet in a $2,500 no limit hold 'em short-handed event. In 2014, he won the $10,000 Omaha Hi-Low Championship to win his third career WSOP bracelet. He has 37 career cashes at the WSOP, including 10 final tables.

Like many other poker players, including David Williams and Justin Bonomo, Parker played the trading card game Magic: The Gathering before turning to poker.

As of 2014, his total live tournament winnings exceed $3,218,462. His 37 cashes at the WSOP account for $2,089,982 of those winnings.

== World Series of Poker Bracelets ==
Year	Tournament	Prize (US$)
2009	$2,500 Limit Hold'em Short Handed	$223,688
2009	$2,500 No Limit Hold'em Short Handed	$552,745
2014	$10,000 Omaha Hi-Low Championship	$443,407

Brock Parker
- Pro Tour debut: Pro Tour Los Angeles 1999
- Winnings: US$77,350
- Pro Tour wins (Top 8): 1 (1)
- Grand Prix wins (Top 8): 2 (8)
- Lifetime Pro Points: 205
