= Lisa Hamilton =

American poker player

World Series of Poker
- Bracelet: 1
- Money finishes: 18
- Highest WSOP Main Event finish: None

World Poker Tour
- Title: None
- Final tables: 2
- Money finishes: 2

Lisa Hamilton is an American poker player and World Series of Poker bracelet winner.

Hamilton won the 2009 WSOP $1,000 Ladies No Limit Hold'em World Championship. In addition to the bracelet, she won the $195,390 cash prize for her victory in the tournament. This was the first career cash for Hamilton in the WSOP.

As of 2025, her total live tournament winnings exceed $1,400,000.
