= Matt Hawrilenko =

American poker player (born 1982)

- Nickname: Hoss_TBF
- Born: January 3, 1982 (age 44); Kingston, Massachusetts, U.S.

World Series of Poker
- Bracelet: 1
- Final tables: 7
- Money finishes: 19
- Highest WSOP Main Event finish: 481st, 2005

Matthew Hawrilenko (born January 3, 1982) is an American former professional poker player from Boston, Massachusetts who won the 2009 World Series of Poker $5,000 No-Limit Hold'em Short-Handed event earning $1,003,218 and is a Full Tilt Poker Pro.

Hawrilenko is a 2004 graduate of Princeton University who worked for Susquehanna International Group prior to becoming a professional poker player. He later went to Clark University for PHD in clinical psychology.

As of 2011, his total live tournament winnings exceed $1,600,000.

== World Series of Poker bracelets ==
Year	Event	Prize Money
2009	$5,000 No-Limit Hold'em Short-Handed	$1,003,218
