= Eric Drache =

American poker player and cardroom manager (born 1943)

- Born: 1943 (age 82–83)

World Series of Poker
- Bracelet: None
- Money finishes: 3
- Highest WSOP Main Event finish: None

Eric Drache (born 1943) is a professional poker player, former cardroom manager and consultant for NBC. Drache is best known for his management contributions to the poker world, and he is also a notable seven-card stud player. He finished second in World Series of Poker stud events in 1973, 1981, and 2009.

Drache was responsible for inventing tournament satellites while running the World Series of Poker in the 1970s as a way to get more entries per tournament. Drache also managed and hosted notable cardrooms at the Golden Nugget and the Mirage. Drache's innovations as poker manager include: ante structures, dealer training and the invention of the "must-move" table. Drache trained both Donna Harris and Doug Dalton, cardroom managers at the Mirage and Bellagio respectively.

In the mid-1990s, Drache was prosecuted on federal tax fraud charges and lost his Nevada gaming license as a result, which is required to work in casinos.

Drache was named to the Poker Hall of Fame in 2012.

As of 2009, Drache's total live poker tournament winnings exceed $325,000.
