= Thang Luu =

Vietnamese-American poker player

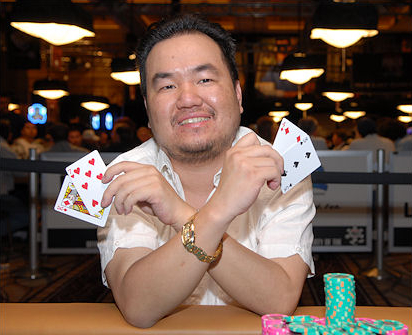
- Luu after winning the $1,500 Omaha Hi-Low Split-8 or Better event at the 2008 World Series of Poker
- Nickname: Tiger Luu

World Series of Poker
- Bracelets: 2
- Money finishes: 5
- Highest WSOP Main Event finish: None

Thang Luu is a Vietnamese American professional poker player.

As of 2008, his total live tournament winnings exceed $750,000.

== World Series of Poker ==
Luu has five cashes at the World Series of Poker (WSOP) including finishing runner-up to Frankie O'Dell at the 2007 World Series of Poker $2,000 Omaha Hi-Low Split-8 or Better event.

In June 2008, Luu won his first World Series of Poker bracelet in the $1,500 Omaha Hi-Low Split-8 or Better event at the 2008 World Series of Poker, earning $243,342. He collected his second bracelet by winning the same event again at the 2009 World Series of Poker, earning $263,135.

=== World Series of Poker bracelets ===
Year	Event	Prize Money
2008	$1,500 Omaha Hi-Low Split-8 or Better	$243,342
2009	$1,500 Omaha Hi-Low Split-8 or Better	$263,135
