= Prahlad Friedman =

American poker player (born 1978)

- Nicknames: spirit Rock, Pragress
- Born: May 20, 1978 (age 48)

World Series of Poker
- Bracelet: 1
- Money finishes: 14
- Highest WSOP Main Event finish: 20th, 2006

World Poker Tour
- Title: 1
- Final table: 1
- Money finishes: 5

Prahlad S. Friedman (born May 20, 1978) is an American professional poker player and rapper from Los Angeles, California. He has played under the screen names "Spirit Rock" on Full Tilt Poker, "Mahatma" on Ultimate Bet, "Zweig" on Prima Network, and "Prefontaine" on PokerStars.

== Career ==
Friedman made his first major cash in the 2002 $3,000 Bellagio Five Diamond Poker Classic Main Event. He finished runner-up for $101,446. Friedman won a World Series of Poker (WSOP) bracelet in 2003 in the $1,500 pot limit hold'em event earning him $109,400. Later, at the WSOP circuit event at Harrah's Rincon in 2005, he won the second place prize of $363,165. At the 2006 WSOP Main Event, Friedman outlasted over 8,700 other players, finishing 20th and securing $494,797. During the tournament, Friedman was noted for an incident with Jeff Lisandro, in which Friedman felt that Lisandro had not put in his ante, worth 5,000 chips, in a hand. Friedman and Lisandro argued constantly through the hand, with the dealer telling them both to stop bringing it up. Friedman would not stop and implied that Lisandro "robbed" the other man of the 5,000. Lisandro was very upset to hear that, and argued with Friedman, telling him he would "take your head off, buddy". Friedman tried to settle things with Lisandro afterward during play, but Lisandro refused to talk to him. Many in the poker world criticized Friedman for his actions, including Norman Chad of ESPN and Todd Brunson of Cardplayer Magazine. In the end, it was discovered in the replay that Lisandro did in fact put in the ante. (In posting one of the blinds, a third player at the table forgot to put in his ante; the dealer corrected his mistake.)

At the 2010 WSOP Main Event, Friedman was involved in another incident, this time involving Ted Bort, in which Friedman had a controversial call with the clock ruled in his favor. On a board of 6s Js 9h, 5d 2c Bort had shoved on the river after leading out on the flop and turn and being called by Friedman. Bort had called the clock on Friedman, with Bort saying "I only wanted some of your chips, not all of them". After the floor had begun the final 10-second count and got between 1 and 0, Friedman has said "Call", however, the floor had declared the hand dead. At the same time, Bort showed Jd 9c for a flopped 2 pair. Friedman released his hand without argument and let the floor declare the action dead and void, indicating that Friedman was indeed beat by top 2 pairs. Other players on the table immediately argued that Friedman had made the call in time and that the hand is live, including Chicago poker player Mike Mustafa. A floor supervisor was called over and had enforced the original ruling, stating that "If the guy wanted to make a decision he could have made it at 5, he gave him to 0, it's a dead hand". In later interviews, Friedman had stated that the reason he called at 0 was that while he believed Bort had a strong hand, he did not know what Bort considered a strong hand to be and therefore was indecisive about his two pairs. Friedman had also confirmed that if he had a winning hand he would have argued the point that he called at 0, but since the ruling stated it was dead at 1 he left it alone to keep himself in the tournament. He made it through Day 2, but was ultimately eliminated early on Day 3, thus failing to cash.

As of 2023, Friedman's total live tournament winnings exceed $2,500,000. His 5 cashes as the WSOP account for $713,372 of those winnings. Friedman was an ethnic studies major at UC Berkeley. It was there that he played a lot of poker for the first time. At the Oaks Club, Friedman honed his game at the $15–$30 limit hold'em table, before switching to the no limit game at the Lucky Chances casino. Friedman's usual online limits are $25–$50 and $50–$100 no-limit hold'em and pot-limit Omaha games.

Friedman is also well known on internet poker message boards for his raps. He has rapped for ESPN for a "The Nuts" segment at the WSOP circuit event at Harrah's Rincon in 2005, the Main Event in the 2006 World Series of Poker, and also for the poker website RakeBreak.

In August 2009, Friedman won the WPT Legends of Poker event for $1,000,900. He defeated 2009 WSOP Main Event "November Niner" Kevin Schaffel heads up.

When Ultimate Bet was involved in a major cheating scandal prior to 2008, Friedman was one of the biggest victims having lost millions of dollars. After rumors started to surface, in December 2010, that Friedman would be signing with UB, many people in the poker community criticized Friedman. When asked how he could sign with a poker site where he was cheated out of millions, Friedman said, "I feel like they took care of me after the scandal. I feel like they didn’t have to pay people back and they did. It was amazing to find out I was going to get a chunk of money back. I have a good relationship with their team and their management and I feel like this is a totally different UB than anything associated with the scandal."

On May 9, 2011, Friedman and ten other U.S. sponsored professionals were informed by UltimateBet's parent company that their contracts had been terminated.

== Personal life ==
He got engaged to Dee Luong, a fellow poker player, in 2002 and later married her within the year. They divorced in 2013 over a decade later after a high-profile divorce trial.

Friedman is a vegan.

Prahlad Friedman did his major in ethnic studies at the University of California, Berkeley, where he started playing poker for the first time.
