= Jeff Shulman =

American poker player (born 1975)

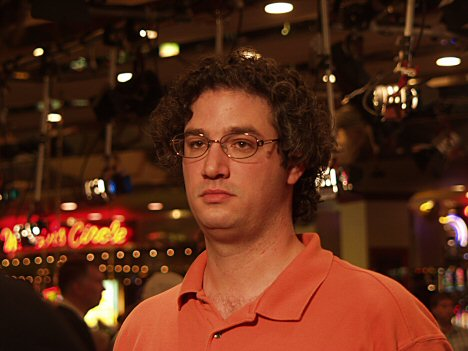
- Jeff Shulman at the Ultimate Poker Challenge
- Nickname: Happy
- Born: February 18, 1975 (age 51)

World Series of Poker
- Bracelet: None
- Money finishes: 28
- Highest WSOP Main Event finish: 5th, 2009

World Poker Tour
- Money finishes: 10

Jeff Shulman (born February 18, 1975) is the editor of Card Player Magazine, and an American poker player with a record of success in tournament play, based in Las Vegas, Nevada. He is the son of Jan Shulman and Barry Shulman. Shulman's father, Barry, is an accomplished poker player and CEO of Card Player.

== Life and career ==
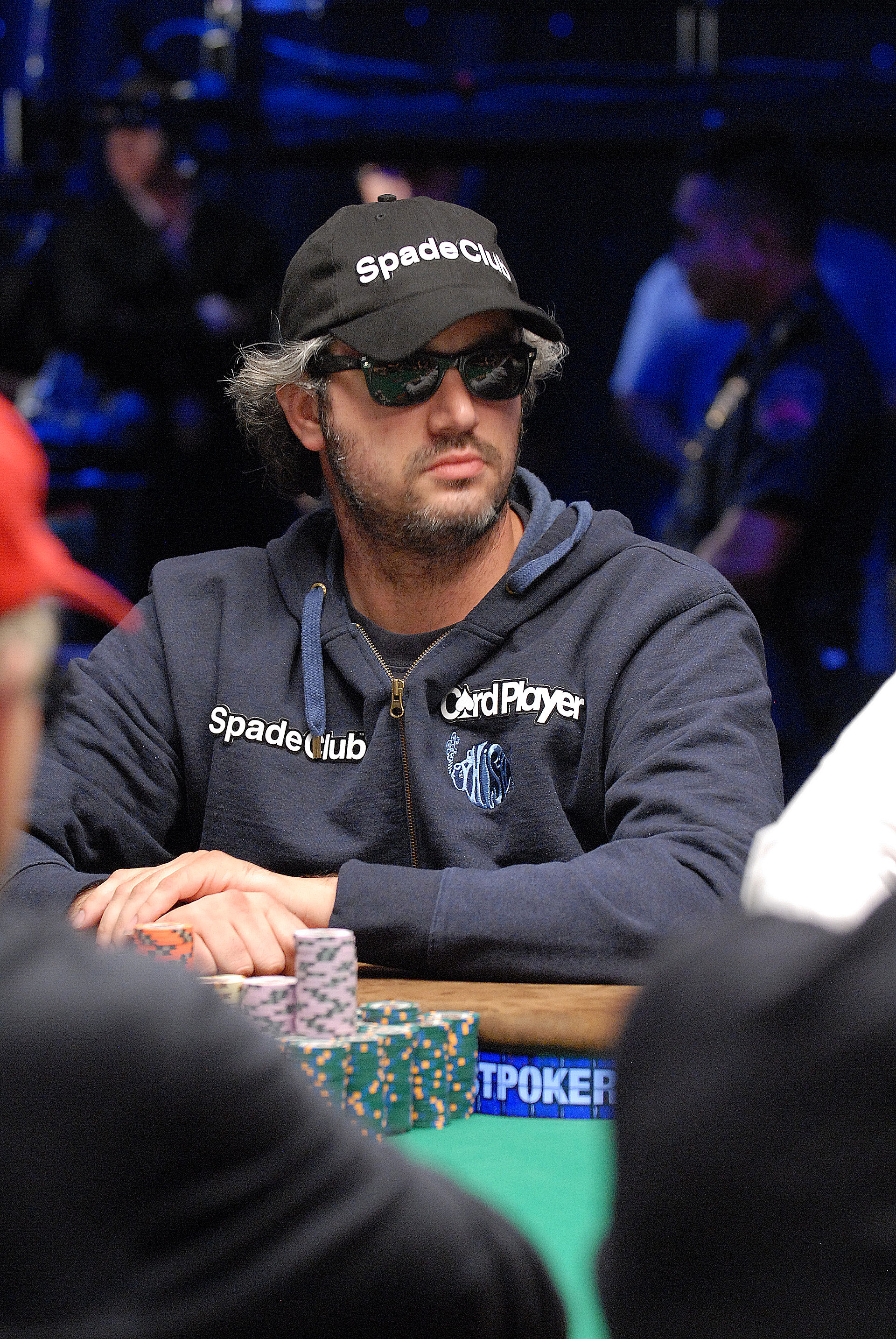
At the 2009 World Series of Poker Main Event

Shulman was born in Seattle, Washington and attended the University of Washington.

He finished 7th in the 2000 World Series of Poker (WSOP) $10,000 no limit Texas hold'em main event, winning $146,700 after losing two big pots to eventual winner Chris Ferguson. He also finished in the money in the same event in 2003 (31st place) and 2009 (5th).

Shulman has cashed in several other WSOP and World Poker Tour (WPT) events. He also won a tournament in the Ultimate Poker Challenge's first season, and made the final table of that season's grand final, won by James Van Alstyne.

In 2006, Shulman appeared on Poker Superstars III finishing in the Elite Eight.

Shulman was a member of the 2009 November Nine. Since Harrah's Casino has partnered with Cardplayer Magazine's competitor, Bluff Magazine, Shulman is reported to loathe Harrah's Casino. He reportedly said that if he were to win the WSOP Main Event, he would throw away the bracelet. An article on the Cardplayer website indicates that Shulman's disdain for Harrah's Casino does not stem from their partnership with Bluff Magazine:

My comments have nothing to do with that, and everything to do with my disappointment in how the World Series is run. It used to be run by people who loved and really cared about poker, and had the players in mind, first and foremost. That mission's been derailed by a few executives who now head the Series.

After qualifying for the 2009 WSOP Main Event final table, Shulman hired Phil Hellmuth as his poker coach. At the final table, Shulman was eliminated in fifth place, cashing for just under $2 million, which is his highest tournament cash to date.

As of January 2024, Shulman's total live tournament winnings is over $3,500,000. The majority of which comes from cashing in the WSOP (over $2.500,000 )

Shulman has one brother, Michael Shulman, an American writer and owner of the online magazine ShulmanSays. Shulman is married to Christy Devine. They have two children.
