= Darvin Moon =

American poker player (1963–2020)

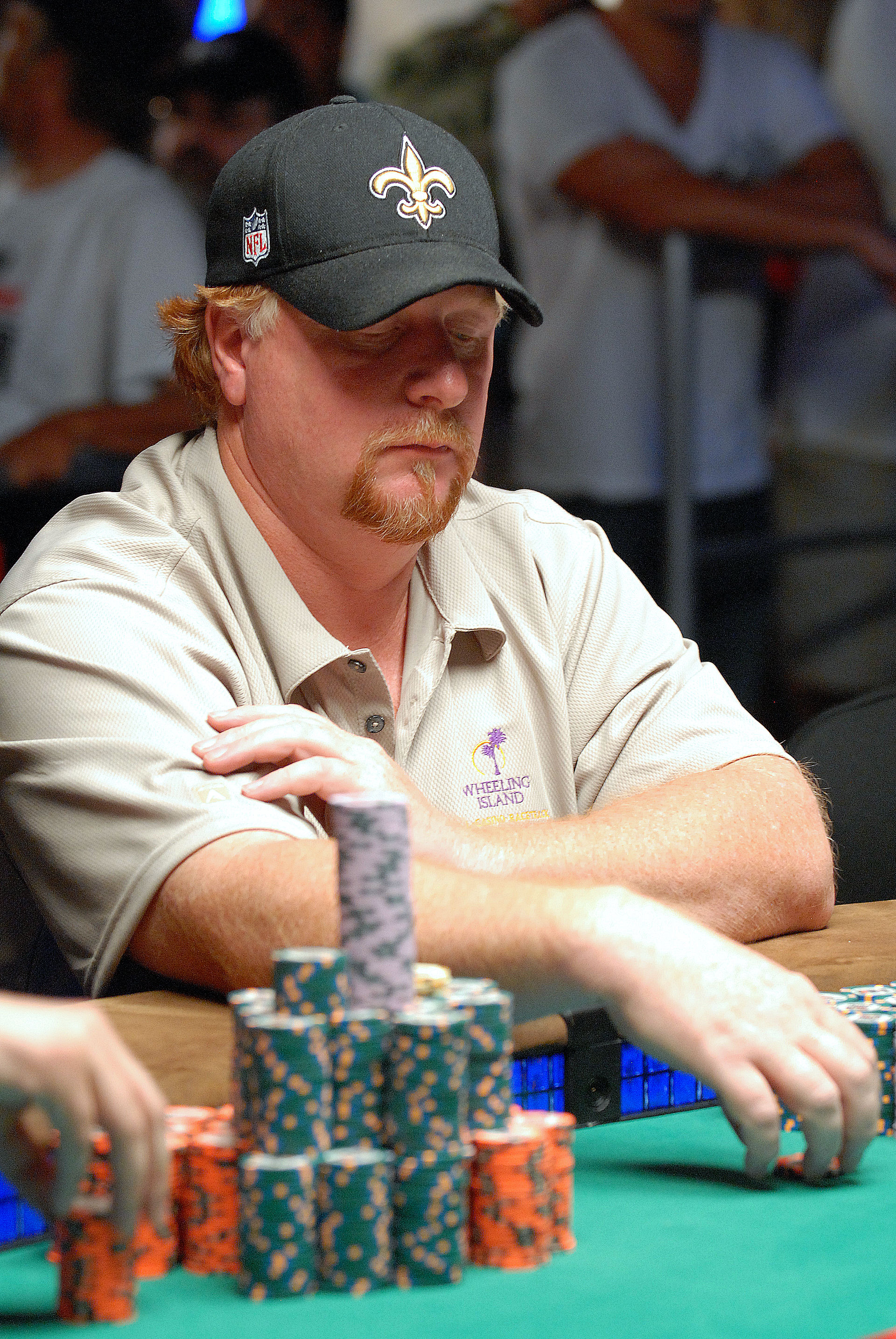
- Moon at the 2009 World Series of Poker Main Event
- Nicknames: Darvin Gump; The Luddite Logger; The Moonman
- Born: October 1, 1963; Oakland, Maryland, U.S.
- Died: September 19, 2020 (aged 56); Oakland, Maryland, U.S.

World Series of Poker
- Bracelet: None
- Money finish: 1
- Highest WSOP Main Event finish: 2nd, 2009

World Poker Tour
- Title: None
- Final table: None
- Money finish: None

Darvin Moon (October 1, 1963 – September 19, 2020) was an American self-employed logger and amateur poker player who was the runner-up of the 2009 World Series of Poker, (WSOP) US$10,000 Main Event. It was his first time playing in the World Series of Poker. Moon, who taught himself how to play poker, ran a small logging company in the Maryland Panhandle before earning a 2009 World Series seat by winning a $130 satellite tournament.

Moon earned the chip lead early in the tournament, and eventually entered the final table as the chip leader, with about 30 percent of the chips in play. Although Moon briefly lost the lead, he eventually regained it after eliminating veteran players like Steve Begleiter and Phil Ivey. Moon ultimately lost heads up against Joe Cada, earning Moon US$5.18 million for his second-place finish.

Although some criticized his playing style and lack of experience, Moon was also praised for his working stiff personality and self-deprecating manner. Moon participated in the 2010 National Heads-Up Poker Championship, but lost in the second round to poker professional Annie Duke. He also competed in the 2010 World Series of Poker Main Event, but was eliminated on Day 2.

== Early life ==
Moon lived in the western Maryland town of Oakland, at the foot of Backbone Mountain. Prior to entering the World Series of Poker, Moon lived in a 14 by 70 feet (4.3 by 21.3 m) trailer with his wife, Wendy. Moon owned and operated a small logging company with other family members. Most of his days were spent in pine forests scattered throughout the Maryland Panhandle. Moon taught himself how to play poker, and he first started playing with his grandfather at a young age. He started playing frequently around 2006 and studied the game by watching televised poker. Moon regularly played home games at such places as fire departments, Elks Lodges, and American Legion buildings.

In 1988, Moon's long time girlfriend Cathy Ford went missing from Gormania, West Virginia. Despite her body never being found, Grant County deputy sheriff Paul Ferrell was convicted of her abduction and murder.

== 2009 World Series of Poker ==
Moon earned his seat in the 2009 World Series of Poker no-limit Texas hold'em Main Event by winning a $130 satellite tournament at the Wheeling Island Casino in Wheeling, West Virginia. He lost in two Wheeling Island tournaments before finishing in first place on his third attempt, winning a $10,000 main event seat and $6,000 for expenses. The event marked Moon's first time playing in the WSOP, as well as visiting Las Vegas, Nevada and riding in a commercial plane. Due to the economic downturn's impact on the logging business, Moon considered keeping the $10,000 instead of entering the tournament, but decided to play after visiting the Rio All Suite Hotel and Casino and watching World Series games there.

Obviously, he's the least experienced. He's probably the worst player at the table. But he loves to advertise that. ... I think there's a little shark in him there, a little pool hustler in him there.

— Norman Chad,
WSOP commentator

On the first day of the tournament, Moon was dealt pocket aces six times and got three-of-a-kind on the flop three times. He performed well on the first day and continued a successful streak throughout the tournament, although he himself proclaimed it was luck. He eliminated several professional poker players during the tournament, including David Benyamine. He eventually obtained the chip lead and kept it until the seventh day of play. At that time, he fell to tenth place, but won a few big hands to recover and ended the day back in the lead. He eliminated Billy Kopp in one of the biggest hands in the tournament when his Q♦ J♦ led to a higher flush than Kopp's 5♦ 3♦. Moon entered the final table as the chip leader, holding 58.6 million chips, or about 30 percent of the chips in play.

During the final table, Moon eliminated Steve Begleiter in sixth place and seasoned professional Phil Ivey in seventh place. In both cases, Moon was behind but caught cards to win; Ivey lost with A-K to Moon's A-Q when a queen came up on the flop, and Begleiter's pocket queens lost to Moon's A-Q when he caught an ace on the river. Moon lost the chip lead during the November Nine game, but his elimination of Begleiter brought him back into the chip lead with 63.9 million chips. He made it to the final two players and went heads up against Joe Cada, with Moon at 58.85 million and Cada at 135.95 million. Moon briefly recovered the chip lead from Cada, but lost it during the 79th heads-up hand, where Cada bet 3 million chips with his J-9 on a 10–5–9–10 turn after the flop was checked, Moon check-raised all in with 8–7. Cada called with his remaining 58 million chips, won the hand and regained the chip lead and the momentum for the duration of the match.

Commentators later criticized Moon for making such an expensive bluff for a small pot, and Moon seemed visibly disappointed after the game. Storms Reback, of All In Magazine, said the hand was a crucial moment for Moon, and that his fatigue from it may have resulted in a bad call in the final hand of the tournament. After 18 hours of play, Moon ended up finishing second against Cada when his Q♦ J♦ succumbed to Cada's 9♦ 9♣. He won $5,182,601 for his second-place finish.

After the tournament ended, Moon was congratulated by professional poker player Phil Hellmuth, who said, "I'm proud of you, Darvin." Some were critical of both Moon and Cada. Mike Matusow, a professional poker player with a reputation for trash-talking, called the heads-up contest between the two "a new low for poker as a skilled game". Storms Reback, of All In Magazine, said Moon was "out of his league" at the tournament, and made a number of questionable calls and bets. As an example, Reback cited a hand in which Moon attempted to bluff by re-raising a bet by Begleiter for 15 million chips, then folding when Begleiter went all in for an additional 6 million, even though Moon was getting better than 7-to-1 odds on his money. Moon said he planned to spend some of his World Series winnings on putting relatives through college and charitable contributions to his home town, including a new youth ball field and recreation center. Moon said of his victory, "We ain't gonna change. The next time you see us, we'll be wearing jeans and everything else, like we always have."

== Post-WSOP poker career ==
Moon played few major poker games after the 2009 World Series of Poker, preferring instead to play local games among friends in the Oakland area. When asked how he had done in those games, Moon replied, "I've done all right. I've held my own." Moon joined 63 other players in the 2010 National Heads-Up Poker Championship at the Caesars Palace in Las Vegas. He paid the $20,000 buy-in from his personal funds. Moon was paired against online qualifier William Huntress in the first round of the tournament on March 5. ESPN writer Gary Wise said Huntress stood "as good a chance of toppling an invited player as any qualifier ever has", and questioned why Moon participated in the tournament given Moon's past claims of disinterest in media exposure and sponsorship. However, PokerNews.com writer Mickey Doft predicted Moon would do well in the tournament due to his unpredictable play. Moon defeated Huntress when his K♦ 10♣ held out against Huntress' J♣ 8♠. The flop was A♣ Q♣ 4♣, giving Huntress the better draw, but Moon won with king-high when another club failed to come on the turn or river, advancing Moon to the second round. He lost in that round to Annie Duke, whose three kings bested Moon's two pair of queens and tens. Duke went on to win the tournament.

In August 2010, Moon joined Main Event champions Chris Moneymaker and Jonathan Duhamel in hosting the Mega Stack Series XVII, a live poker tournament at Foxwoods Resort Casino in Ledyard, Connecticut which drew 2,200 participants and had a total prize pool of more than $1 million. The next month, Moon entered the 2010 World Series of Poker no-limit Texas hold-em Main Event. Early in the tournament, Moon doubled up with pocket kings against a player with pocket jacks. He was eliminated on day two, however, after moving all in with 10♦ 9♦ on a 9♣ 4♣ 2♣ flop. His opponent had pocket aces, and Moon received no help with a K♦ turn and 5♦ river. Leaving the poker room, he said to his wife, "At least the pressure's off, honey."

In 2011, Moon accepted a deal to become Tour Ambassador for Heartland Poker Tour, wearing the patch of the nationally televised tour and playing in several HPT events. HPT President Todd Anderson of Moon: "Darvin is our kind of guy. He's worked hard his entire life and now lives the dream that attracts so many to the game." Moon became a fan favorite among HPT's tour regulars when he declined an invitation for the November Nine taping in 2010 to play an HPT stop in Iowa. A last minute replacement for an ill Scotty Nguyen, Moon bonded with HPT's crew and players. Moon said, "I'm very comfortable with the HPT folks. They're like family."

Moon died on September 19, 2020, following complications from surgery. He was 56.

== Personality and style ==
Moon displayed what he described as a humble and self-deprecating manner during the World Series of Poker, acknowledging his lack of poker experience throughout the course of the tournament, and often attributing his success to luck and a high number of strong cards, rather than talent. Moon adopted a phrase, "If I win, I win. If I lose, I lose," which reflected his casual approach to the game. Moon also said one of his philosophies was, "Make the other guy pay to see the cards", a strategy attributed to many re-raises Moon made during the 2009 World Series of Poker despite weak hands. Moon had almost no experience in heads-up poker, which some commentators said factored into his loss against Cada in the final hours of the 2009 World Series. Many fans and commentators praised his working stiff style, with some dubbing him "Darvin Gump", a reference to the underdog protagonist of the 1994 drama film, Forrest Gump. Moon was also bestowed with the nickname the "Luddite Logger" because of his distaste for anything technological, including credit cards and online poker. Moon refused to sign a sponsorship deal with an Internet poker company during the 2009 tournament because he said he did not want to answer to anybody. Moon wore a New Orleans Saints hat throughout the tournament because, "I like cheering for the underdog." Moon was invited as a guest at the Saints games for their entire playoff run in 2010, and was on hand to watch them win Super Bowl XLIV against the Indianapolis Colts in Miami.
