= Péter Traply =

Hungarian poker player (born 1987)

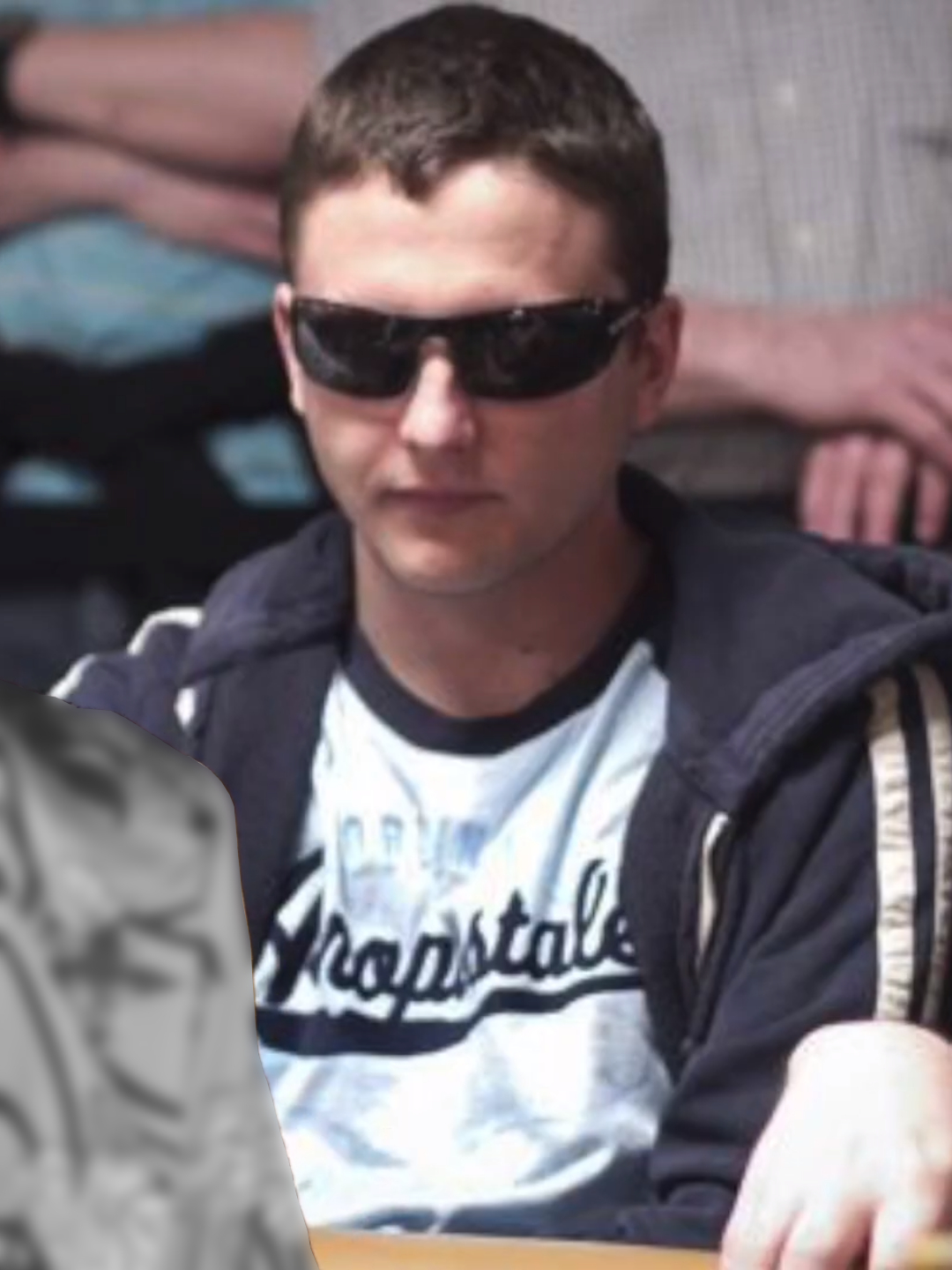
- Traply at the 2010 World Series of Poker
- Nickname: Belabacsi
- Born: March 27, 1987 (age 39)

World Series of Poker
- Bracelet: 1
- Money finishes: 5
- Highest WSOP Main Event finish: 188th, 2008

World Poker Tour
- Title: None
- Final table: 1
- Money finishes: 2

European Poker Tour
- Title: None
- Final table: 1
- Money finishes: 2

Péter Traply (born March 27, 1987) is a Hungarian poker player. Traply is the first ever Hungarian to win a WSOP bracelet, back in 2009.

He started playing poker at the age of 18, grinding freeroll tournaments to build his bankroll, and was able to enter live tournaments before graduating from college.

As of 2020, his total live tournament winnings exceed $900,000.

Under the screen name "Belabacsi" (beɪlʌbɑːtʃi) he has won over $17,718,014 and made 10 PocketFives Triple Crowns.

== Online Poker ==
Mainly known as "Belabacsi" on Pokerstars and Fulltilt, Péter Traply also plays under the following aliases :

- HungarysHero (partypoker)
- kiskutya23 (888poker)
- OmeletteduFR (PokerStars.fr / Winamax.fr)

Péter Traply ranks as number one on the PocketFives All Time Money List, with $16,727,488 of total earnings online as of July 2019.

His biggest win was during a SCOOP Tournament back in May 2009, where he finished first in the $2,100 NLHE event for $312,360.
