= Matt Graham (poker player) =

American poker player

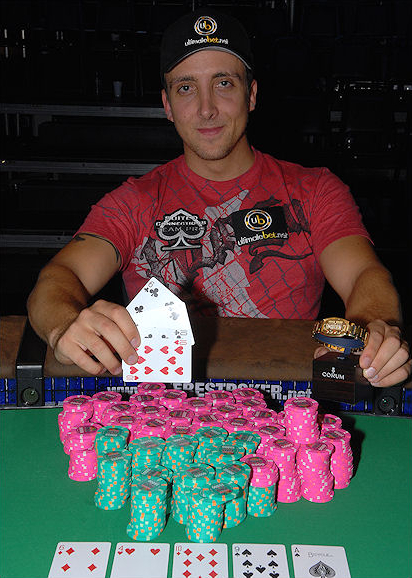
- Graham after winning the $10,000 World Championship Pot Limit Omaha event at the 2009 World Series of Poker.
- Nickname: mattg1983
- Born: New Orleans, Louisiana

World Series of Poker
- Bracelets: 2
- Final tables: 2
- Money finishes: 8

World Poker Tour
- Title: None
- Final table: None
- Money finishes: 5

Matthew Graham (born in New Orleans, Louisiana) is an American professional poker player from Houston, Texas, who is a two time World Series of Poker bracelet winner, He won his first bracelet at the 2008 World Series of Poker in the $1,500 Limit Hold'em Shootout event. During the next year at the 2009 World Series of Poker, he won his second bracelet in the $10,000 World Championship Pot Limit Omaha event.

Graham in a member of Team UB as a sponsored professional poker player at the online cardroom Ultimate Bet.

As of 2023, his total live tournament winnings exceed $1,800,000.

== World Series of Poker bracelets ==
Year	Event	Prize Money
2008	$1,500 Limit Hold'em Shootout	$278,180
2009	$10,000 World Championship Pot Limit Omaha	$679,402
