= Steve Sung =

South Korean poker player (born 1985)

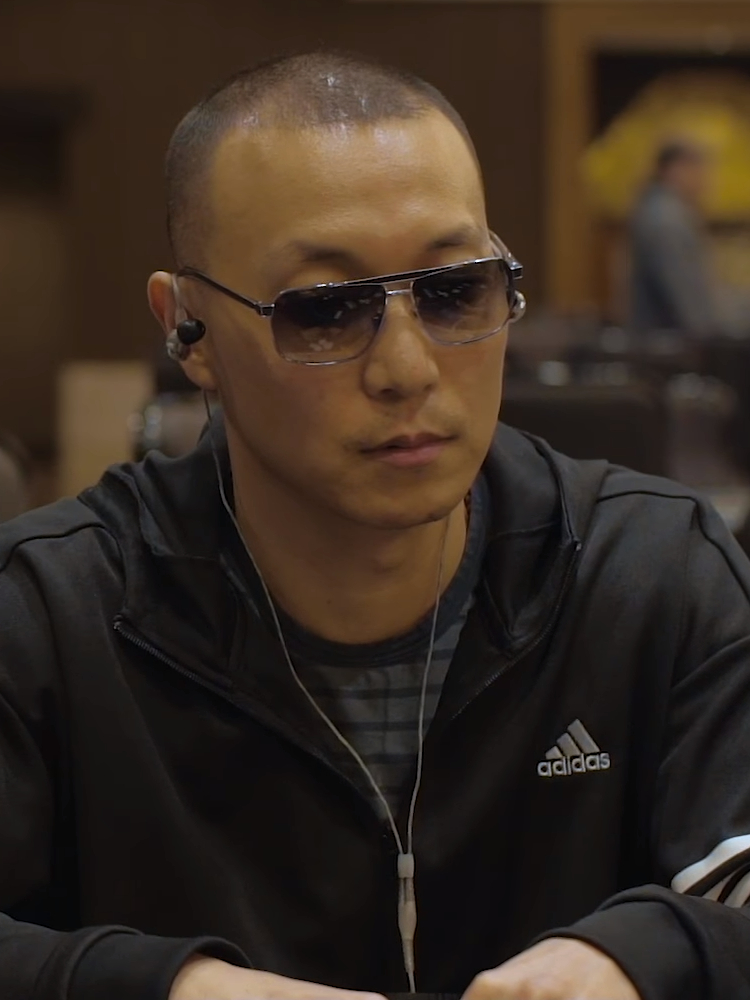
- Sung in 2019
- Nickname: MuGGyLiCiOuS
- Born: 1985 (age 40–41); Seoul, South Korea

World Series of Poker
- Bracelets: 2
- Money finishes: 20
- Highest WSOP Main Event finish: 291st, 2007

World Poker Tour
- Final tables: 4
- Money finishes: 20

European Poker Tour
- Money finish: 1

Suk-Min "Steve" Sung (born 1985) is a South Korean professional poker player residing in Torrance, California who is a two time World Series of Poker bracelet winner and a three time final tablist of World Poker Tour Championships.

Sung was born in Seoul, South Korea. At the age of seven, Sung and his family, moved from South Korea to the United States, His interest in poker began when he notice his father playing the game then later Steve would play friends of his while still attending high school, after he graduated, Sung attended the University of California, San Diego to study both computer engineering and economics but dropped out of college in order to become a full-time professional poker player.

== World Poker Tour ==
Sung has finished in the money ten times at the World Poker Tour (WPT), most notably making three of the six player final tables his first two were at the WPT Season VI where at the €7,500 WPT Spanish Championship he finished in 4th earning €117,400 ($164,943) and later at the Bay 101 Shooting Star where he was the runner-up to Brandon Cantu, earning $585,000. In Season VII of the WPT Sung again made a final table at the Doyle Brunson Five Diamond World Poker Classic (the same event he finished 9th in Season V), this time finishing in 4th place earning $396,205.

== World Series of Poker ==
Sung has nine World Series of Poker (WSOP) cashes, making five final tables. His first two were at the 2007 World Series of Poker where he finished 3rd in the $1,500 Seven-Card Stud event earning $51,222 and placing 9th in the $10,000 World Championship Pot Limit Omaha event, earning $50,177.

The next year at the 2008 World Series of Poker he made the final table in the $5,000 Seven Card Stud Hi-Low World Championship where he finished 7th, earning $46,001 in a final table made up of professionals such as Annie Duke, Marcel Lüske, Chris Ferguson and the winner of the event Sebastian Ruthenberg. He also came close to making a six player final table in the $2,500 2-7 Triple Draw event where he finished in 8th place. Sung cashed at the 2007 World Series of Poker Main Event where he finished in 291st out of 6,358 entries which was won that year by Jerry Yang.

At the 2009 World Series of Poker in the $1,000 No-Limit Hold'em event Sung won his first bracelet earning $771,338. Less than two weeks later, Sung took 3rd in the $10,000 2-7 Lowball Championship for $112,041.

At the 2013 World Series of Poker Sung won the $25,000 No Limit Hold'em Six Handed in field of 175 entries earning $1,205,324, with a final table of notable poker professional that includes, online cash specialist Richard "nutsinho" Lyndaker (6th), Maxi Lehmanski (5th), Stephen "stevie444" Chidwick (4th), Dani Stern (3rd) and the runner-up Phil Galfond.

As of 2022, his total live tournament winnings exceed $6,000,000. His 62 cashes at the WSOP account for over $3,000,000 of those winnings.

== World Series of Poker Bracelets ==
Year	Tournament	Prize (US$)
2009	$1,000 No Limit Hold'em	$771,106
2013	$25,000 No Limit Hold'em Six Handed	$1,205,324
