= Lee Watkinson =

American poker player (born 1966)

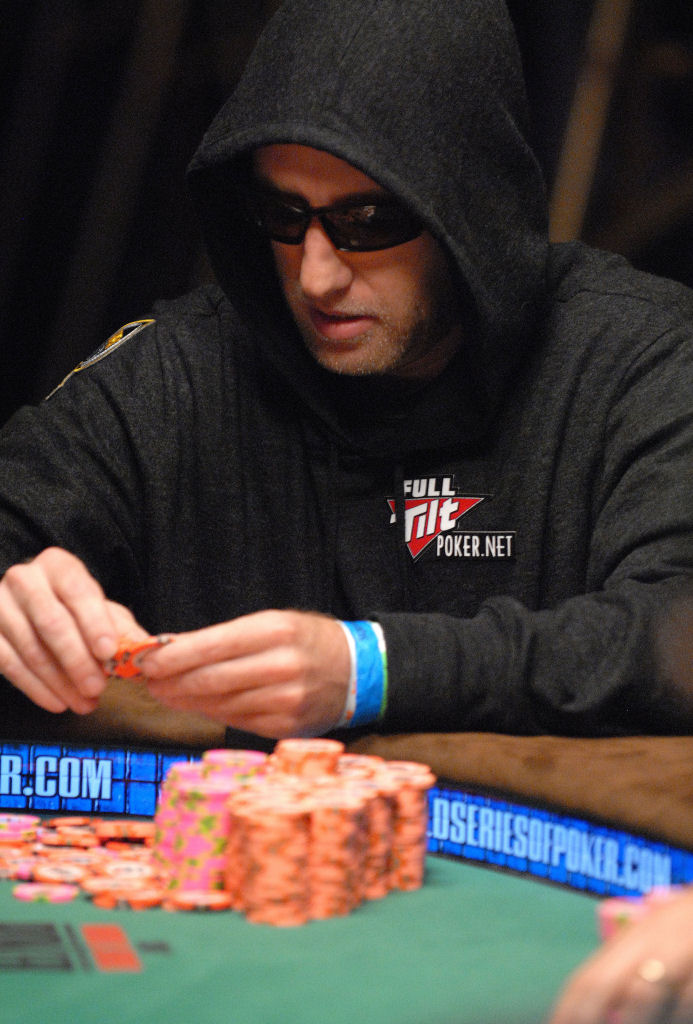
- Watkinson at the final table of the 2007 World Series of Poker.
- Born: October 18, 1966 (age 60)

World Series of Poker
- Bracelet: 1
- Final tables: 6
- Money finishes: 18
- Highest WSOP Main Event finish: 8th, 2007

World Poker Tour
- Title: None
- Final tables: 3
- Money finishes: 6

Lee Watkinson (born October 18, 1966) is an American professional poker player, originally from Longbranch, Washington.

At the 2004 World Series of Poker (WSOP), Watkinson finished 2nd in the $5,000 pot limit Omaha event. He finished in the money of that year's $10,000 no limit Texas hold 'em main event, finishing 113th.

Watkinson made back-to-back World Poker Tour (WPT) final tables during its third season. The first time he finished 2nd to Eli Elezra, and the second time he finished 2nd again, this time to Doyle Brunson.

Watkinson made back-to-back WSOP main event cashes at the 2005 World Series of Poker (WSOP), finishing in 45th place out of 5,619 entrants for a $235,390 prize. He also made the final table of a WSOP circuit event in November 2005, finishing 3rd.

At the 2006 WSOP, Watkinson won a bracelet and the $655,746 first prize in the $10,000 pot limit Omaha event when his A♣ Q♠ 6♣ 5♣ defeated Mike Guttman's J♠ J♣ 10♦ 8♦ on a board of 5♠ 4♠ 3♥ 7♦ K♥.

Watkinson made the final table and finished 8th in the 2007 World Series of Poker Main Event, earning $585,699.

In 2008, Watkinson final tabled 2 consecutive tournaments, taking 5th in the WPT Borgata Winter Open and 7th in the WSOP Circuit Main Event at Harrah's Rincon in San Diego, California.

In 2009, Watkinson cashed twice at the World Series of Poker. He took 36th in the $1000 No-Limit Hold'em event and just missed winning his 2nd bracelet when he took 2nd in the $1500 Pot-Limit Omaha High/Low event for $141,873.

As of 2010, his total live tournament winnings exceed $4,100,000. His 16 cashes at the WSOP account for $2,306,264 of those winnings.

== Outside poker ==
He is an economics graduate and quotes wrestling and surfing as his main interests outside poker. He wrestled at 142 pounds in college and 187 pounds the last time that he wrestled in 2001. Lee is a humanitarian, working with the Cortland Brandenburg Foundation to rescue retired chimpanzee test subjects. Watkinson attended college at Eastern Washington University.
