= Jason DeWitt =

American poker player (born 1983)

- Nickname: TheMasterJ33
- Born: September 20, 1983 (age 43)

World Series of Poker
- Bracelets: 2
- Final tables: 7
- Money finishes: 24
- Highest WSOP Main Event finish: 274th, 2010

World Poker Tour
- Title: None
- Final table: 1
- Money finishes: 5

Jason DeWitt (born September 20, 1983) is a professional poker player from Mishawaka, Indiana, who won the 2010 World Series of Poker $5,000 No Limit Hold'em event. and the 2016 World Series of Poker $1,500 Millionaire Maker.

== Early life ==
Jason DeWitt started playing poker with friends in 2004, when he worked at a local South Bend, Indiana Super Market. He quickly discovered he had a knack for Texas Hold 'em. He would play with friends and realized he was winning quite often. He decided to start training, reading books and joined online forums to improve his game. He eventually built up a large enough bankroll that allowed him to quit his day job.

After six months as a professional, Jason won two online tournaments on Christmas for $90,000. By 2006, Jason had over $250,000 in online winnings, which allowed him to play in live tournaments during the Summer WSOP series. He quickly started seeing success live and online, with total winnings of over $1,000,000 by 2009. To date, Jason has over $4,500,000 in combined online/live winnings.

== Live poker ==
Jason DeWitt has appeared at seven World Series of Poker (WSOP) final tables. DeWitt's WSOP final tables consist of the following:

- 2006 World Series of Poker $2,000 No-Limit Hold'em Shootout event (6th place);
- 2009 World Series of Poker $1,500 Pot-Limit Hold'em event (3rd place);
- 2009 World Series of Poker $3,000 No-Limit Hold'em (2nd place);
- 2010 World Series of Poker $5,000 No-Limit Hold 'em (1st place);
- 2013 World Series of Poker $3,000 Pot-Limit Omaha (9th place);
- 2016 World Series of Poker $1,500 No-Limit Hold 'em (1st place);
- 2017 World Series of Poker $10,000 Pot-Limit Omaha (5th place);

Additionally, DeWitt has 2 final table appearances at WSOP Circuit events, 1 final table at a World Poker Tour event and 1 final table at a Heartland Poker Tour event. DeWitt's WSOP Circuit, WPT and Heartland Poker Tour final tables consist of the following:

- 2008 World Series of Poker Circuit- $5,150 No-Limit Hold 'em Circuit Championship (8th place)
- 2008 Heartland Poker Tour Main Event- 2,500 No-Limit Hold 'em (2nd place)
- 2011 World Poker Tour Main Event- $10,000 No-Limit Hold 'em (9th place)
- 2012 World Series of Poker Circuit- $565 No-Limit Hold 'em (9th place)

As of 2024, Jason's total live tournament winnings exceed $3,300,000 and his online winnings exceed $1,500,000.

=== World Series of Poker bracelets ===
Year	Event	Prize Money
2010	$5,000 No Limit Hold'em	$818,959
2016	$1,500 Millionaire Maker No Limit Hold'em	$1,065,403

At the 2012 WSOP, Jason DeWitt had a confrontation with then UltimateBet spokesperson Annie Duke when she joined his table, cussing her. He explained his attitude in an interview done on YouTube Channel QuadJacks.

== Online poker ==
DeWitt plays under the screen name “TheMasterJ33” on PokerStars.

== Personal life ==
Jason resides in Las Vegas, Nevada, where he focuses on his professional career as a poker player and investor. Jason DeWitt graduated from Mishawaka High School (MHS) with follow MHS alumnus Adam Driver in 2002.

DeWitt had a dog named Buddy that was central in his life and is mentioned in any important poker interview, including after his Milly Maker chat.
