= Thomas Keller (card game player) =

American poker player (born 1980)

- Nickname: Thunder
- Born: October 14, 1980 (age 46); Ann Arbor, Michigan, U.S.

World Series of Poker
- Bracelet: 1
- Money finishes: 5
- Highest WSOP Main Event finish: 61st, 2008

World Poker Tour
- Money finishes: 2

Thomas Keller (born October 14, 1980, in Ann Arbor, Michigan) is an American professional poker player, residing in Scottsdale, Arizona and Las Vegas, Nevada. He is the brother of Shawn "Lightning" Keller.

Keller graduated from Stanford University with a degree in economics in 2002. He began playing poker while at Stanford, having been influenced by the movie Rounders. Like David Williams and Noah Boeken, Keller credits his experience of playing Magic: The Gathering as a helpful factor in his poker career.

In Phoenix, his jump from playing low limits to the biggest high-stakes games happened quickly. One local story is that Keller won so many $100 chips at Casino Arizona that the casino ran out, forcing high limit players to buy chips from him, which he sold from the trunk of his car. Keller has said the story is absurd, but the fact it persists attests to how well Keller did in high limit games during the era.

In December 2003, Keller won the $281,525 first prize in the $2,500 no limit hold'em event of the Five Diamond World Poker Classic, defeating Allen Cunningham in the final heads-up confrontation.

He went on to defeat Martin de Knijff to win a World Series of Poker bracelet in 2004 in the $5,000 no limit hold'em event.

Keller also appeared on the World Poker Tour (WPT) Young Guns of Poker invitational, where he finished 4th. He is also a part of Robert Williamson III's Team America in the Poker Nations Cup.

Keller has been a primary columnist for Card Player since 2004.

He married his wife Andra on April 24, 2004. Andra gave birth to their first child, Kaylee Keller, in September 2006. They had their second child, Alexander, in late February 2009.

Keller lost over 200 pounds after having gastric bypass surgery.

Keller cashed twice at the 2008 World Series of Poker including finishing in 61st place out of 6,844 entries in the $10,000 buy-in Main Event, earning $115,800.

As of 2017, his total live tournament winnings exceed $1,400,000. His 5 cashes as the WSOP account for $789,127 of those winnings.
