= World Series of Poker multiple bracelet winners =

Below is a list of all poker players who have won multiple World Series of Poker (WSOP) bracelets, together with the year(s) in which the bracelets were won.

== WSOP bracelet records ==
Correct as of 29 September 2026 (minus review of 2025 WSOP Online and 2026 WSOP Online)

Record		Player	Bracelets
Total		(United States) Phil Hellmuth	17
Per game	Texas hold'em	(United States) Phil Hellmuth	14
Per game	Non-Texas hold'em	(United States) Phil Ivey	11
Per game	Omaha hold'em	(United States) Daniel Alaei	4
Per game	Draw poker	(United States) Billy Baxter	6
Per game	Stud poker	(United States) Gary "Bones" Berland	5
Per game	Mixed games	(United States) Phil Ivey	5
Per location	Las Vegas	(United States) Phil Hellmuth	16
Per location	Online	(United States) Guy Dunlap	5
Per location	Europe	(Czech Republic) Martin Kabrhel	4
Per location	Asia Pacific	15 players	1
Per location	Paradise	45 players	1
Per location	Circuit	(United States) Ryan Eriquezzo	2
Per decade	1970s	(United States) Johnny Moss	7
Per decade	1980s	(United States) Stu Ungar	4
Per decade	1990s	(United States) Phil Hellmuth	5
Per decade	2000s	(United States) Phil Ivey	7
Per decade	2010s	(United States) Michael Mizrachi	5
Per decade	2020s	(United Kingdom) Benny Glaser	6
Female		(Canada) Kristen (Bicknell) Foxen	6
In one year		(United States) Walter "Puggy" Pearson (1973) (United States) Phil Hellmuth (1993) (United States) Ted Forrest (1993) (United States) Phil Ivey (2002) (Australia) Jeff Lisandro (2009) (Germany) George Danzer (2014, 2014A) (United States) Scott Seiver (2024) (United Kingdom) Benny Glaser (2025)	3
In one year (buy-in $10,000+)		(United States) Jason Mercier (2016) (United States) Scott Seiver (2024) (United States) Michael Mizrachi (2025) (Japan) Naoya Kihara (2026) (United States) Calvin Anderson (2026) (Finland) Eelis Parssinen (2026)	2
In one year (buy-in $25,000+)		(Finland) Eelis Parssinen (2026)	2
In consecutive years		(United States) Bill Boyd (1971–1974) (United States) Doyle Brunson (1976–1979) (United States) Loren Klein (2016–2019) (United States) Nick Schulman (2023–2026)	4
From Main Event wins		(United States) Johnny Moss (1970, 1971, 1974) (United States) Stu Ungar (1980, 1981, 1997)	3

- Johnny Moss became the first player to win 2 WSOP bracelets (with two wins at the 1971 WSOP).
- Johnny Moss became the first player to win 5 WSOP bracelets (with a win at the 1975 WSOP).
- Johnny Chan became the first player to win 10 WSOP bracelets (with a win in Event #25 at the 2005 WSOP), just a few days before Doyle Brunson won his 10th bracelet in Event #31 of that same WSOP.
- Phil Hellmuth became the first player to win 10 Hold'em WSOP bracelets (with a win at the 2006 WSOP).
- Phil Hellmuth became the first player to win the Main Event in both Las Vegas (1989 WSOP) and Europe (2012 WSOP Europe).
- Phil Ivey became the first player to win 5 mixed-game WSOP bracelets (with a win at the 2013 Asia Pacific).
- Tom Schneider became the first player to win 2 mixed-game WSOP bracelets in the same year (2013 WSOP).
- Phil Ivey became the first player to win 10 non-Hold'em WSOP bracelets (with a win at the 2014 WSOP).
- Phil Hellmuth became the first player to win 15 WSOP bracelets (with a win at the 2018 WSOP).

== List of players with 2 or more WSOP bracelets ==
Correct as of 29 September 2026 (minus review of 2025 WSOP Online and 2026 WSOP Online)

	Bracelet record-holder.
	Elected to the Poker Hall of Fame.
	Winner of a Main Event (year in **bold**).
[O]	Bracelet won at a 2020 WSOP Online, 2021 WSOP Online, 2022 WSOP Online, 2023 WSOP Online, or 2024 WSOP Online event.
o	Bracelet won from an online event during a non-online series.
[E]	Bracelet won at a WSOP Europe event.
[A]	Bracelet won at a WSOP Asia Pacific event.
[P]	Bracelet won at a 2023 WSOP Paradise, or 2024 WSOP Paradise event.
[C]	Bracelet by winning the WSOP Circuit National Championship/Global Casino Championship/Tournament of Champions.

Bracelets	Player	THE	OHE	Draw	Stud	Mixed	Year(s)	Vegas	Online	Other
17	(United States) Phil Hellmuth	14	0	1	2	0	**1989**, 1992, 1993 (3), 1997, 2001, 2003 (2), 2006, 2007, 2012, **2012 [E]**, 2015, 2018, 2021, 2023	16	0	1
11	(United States) Phil Ivey	0	2	2	2	5	2000, 2002 (3), 2005, 2009 (2), 2010, 2013 [A], 2014, 2024	10	0	1
10	(United States) Doyle Brunson	4	0	1	4	1	**1976** (2), **1977** (2), 1978, 1979, 1991, 1998, 2003, 2005	10	0	0
10	(United States) Johnny Chan	6	2	1	1	0	1985, **1987**, **1988**, 1994, 1997, 2000, 2002, 2003 (2), 2005	10	0	0
10	(United States) Erik Seidel	6	2	2	0	0	1992, 1993, 1994, 1998, 2001, 2003, 2005, 2007, 2021 [O], 2023 [P]	8	1	1
9	(United States) Shaun Deeb	3	3	0	1	2	2015, 2016, 2018 (2), 2021, 2023, 2025, 2025 [E], 2026	8	0	1
9	(United Kingdom) Benny Glaser	0	2	3	1	3	2015, 2016 (2), 2021, 2023, 2025 (3), 2026	9	0	0
9	(United States) Michael Mizrachi	3	1	0	1	4	2010, 2011 [E], 2012, 2018, 2019, 2024o, **2025** (2), 2026	7	1	1
9	(United States) Johnny Moss	3	0	2	4	0	**1970**, **1971** (2), **1974**, 1975, 1976, 1979, 1981, 1988	9	0	0
8	(Canada) Daniel Negreanu	5	1	0	0	2	1998, 2003, 2004, 2008, **2013 [A]**, 2013 [E], 2024, 2026	6	0	2
8	(United States) Nick Schulman	2	1	3	1	1	2009, 2012, 2019, 2023, 2024, 2024 [P], 2025, 2026	7	0	1
7	(United States) Calvin Anderson	1	1	0	3	2	2014, 2018, 2023 [O] (2), 2024, 2026 (2)	5	2	0
7	(United States) Josh Arieh	3	3	0	0	1	1999, 2005, 2021 (2), 2023 (2), 2025 [O]	6	1	0
7	(United States) Billy Baxter	0	0	6	1	0	1975, 1978, 1982 (2), 1987, 1993, 2002	7	0	0
7	(United States) John Hennigan	1	0	1	2	3	2002, 2004, 2014, 2016, 2018, 2019, 2024	7	0	0
7	(Vietnam) Men Nguyen	1	1	1	4	0	1992, 1995 (2), 1996, 2003 (2), 2010	7	0	0
7	(United States) Brian Rast	2	0	1	1	3	2011 (2), 2016, 2018, 2021, 2023, 2025	7	0	0
7	(United States) Scott Seiver	3	1	1	2	0	2008, 2018, 2019, 2022, 2024 (3)	7	0	0
6	(United States) Jeremy Ausmus	4	2	0	0	0	2013 [E], 2021 (2), 2022, 2022 [O], 2023o	3	2	1
6	(United States) T. J. Cloutier	2	3	0	1	0	1987, 1994 (2), 1998, 2004, 2005	6	0	0
6	(Brazil) Yuri Dzivielevski	1	2	0	0	3	2019, 2020 [O], 2023, 2023 [O], 2024, 2026	4	2	0
6	(United States) Chris Ferguson	1	3	0	1	1	**2000** (2), 2001, 2003 (2), 2017 [E]	5	0	1
6	(United States) Layne Flack	4	2	0	0	0	1999, 2002 (2), 2003 (2), 2008	6	0	0
6	(United States) Ted Forrest	1	1	0	4	0	1993 (3), 2004 (2), 2014	6	0	0
6	(Canada) Kristen (Bicknell) Foxen	6	0	0	0	0	2013, 2016, 2020 [O], 2023 [O], 2024 [O], 2026	3	3	0
6	(United States) Brian Hastings	1	0	1	2	2	2012, 2015 (2), 2018, 2021, 2022	6	0	0
6	(United States) Jay Heimowitz	5	1	0	0	0	1975, 1986, 1991, 1994, 2000, 2001	6	0	0
6	(Czech Republic) Martin Kabrhel	5	1	0	0	0	2017 [E], 2018 [E], 2024 [E], 2025, 2025 [E], 2026o	1	1	4
6	(Australia) Jeff Lisandro	0	2	0	4	0	2007, 2009 (3), 2010 [E], 2014 [A]	4	0	2
6	(Spain) Adrián Mateos	6	0	0	0	0	**2013 [E]**, 2016, 2017, 2021, 2025o, 2026	4	1	1
6	(United States) Jason Mercier	1	2	2	0	1	2009, 2011, 2015, 2016 (2), 2023	6	0	0
5	(United States) Daniel Alaei	0	4	1	0	0	2006, 2009, 2010, 2013, 2015	5	0	0
5	(United States) Gary "Bones" Berland	0	0	0	5	0	1977, 1978 (2), 1979 (2)	5	0	0
5	(China) David Chiu	2	1	0	2	0	1996, 1998, 2000, 2005, 2013	5	0	0
5	(United States) Allen Cunningham	3	0	1	1	0	2001, 2002, 2005, 2006, 2007	5	0	0
5	(United States) Guy Dunlap	4	1	0	0	0	2020 [O], 2023 [O] (2), 2024 [O], 2026o	0	5	0
5	(Israel) Eli Elezra	0	1	1	3	0	2007, 2013, 2015, 2019, 2022	5	0	0
5	(United States) Adam Friedman	0	0	0	2	3	2012, 2018, 2019, 2021, 2022	5	0	0
5	(Russia) Mike Gorodinsky	0	1	0	0	4	2013, 2015, 2023, 2024 [P], 2025	4	0	1
5	(United States) Berry Johnston	3	1	0	1	0	1983, **1986**, 1990, 1995, 2001	5	0	0
5	(Indonesia) John Juanda	1	1	2	1	0	2002, 2003 (2), **2008 [E]**, 2011	4	0	1
5	(United States) Jeff Madsen	2	2	0	0	1	2006 (2), 2013, 2015, 2026	5	0	0
5	(United States) Robert Mizrachi	0	2	0	1	2	2007, 2014, 2015, 2016, 2024	5	0	0
5	(United States) John Monnette	1	0	2	1	1	2011, 2012, 2017, 2021, 2023	5	0	0
5	(Israel) Asi Moshe	4	0	0	0	1	2014, 2018 [E], 2019, 2019 [E], 2026	3	0	2
5	(Vietnam) Scotty Nguyen	1	3	0	0	1	1997, **1998**, 2001 (2), 2008	5	0	0
5	(United States) David Peters	5	0	0	0	0	2016, 2020 [O], 2021 [O], 2022, 2026	3	2	0
5	(United States) Brad Ruben	0	2	1	1	1	2020 [O], 2021 [O], 2021, 2022, 2025	3	2	0
5	(United States) Stu Ungar	3	0	1	1	0	**1980**, **1981** (2), 1983, **1997**	5	0	0
5	(United States) Brian Yoon	3	0	1	1	0	2013, 2014, 2017, 2021, 2023	5	0	0
5	(United States) Anthony Zinno	1	2	0	1	1	2015, 2019, 2021 (2), 2024 [O]	4	1	0
4	(Australia) Michael Addamo	4	0	0	0	0	2018, 2018 [E], 2021 (2)	3	0	1
4	(United States) Mickey Appleman	2	0	1	1	0	1980, 1992, 1995, 2003	4	0	0
4	(United States) David "ODB" Baker	2	0	0	1	1	2012, 2019, 2023, 2025	4	0	0
4	(United States) Bobby Baldwin	1	0	2	1	0	1977 (2), **1978**, 1979	4	0	0
4	(Iran) Farzad Bonyadi	2	0	2	0	0	1998, 2004, 2005, 2021	4	0	0
4	(United States) Bill Boyd	0	0	0	4	0	1971, 1972, 1973, 1974	4	0	0
4	(United States) Joe Cada	4	0	0	0	0	**2009**, 2014, 2018 (2)	4	0	0
4	(United States) Scott Clements	0	3	0	0	1	2006, 2007, 2019, 2026	4	0	0
4	(United States) Artie Cobb	0	0	0	4	0	1983, 1987, 1991, 1998	4	0	0
4	(Germany) George Danzer	0	0	0	3	1	2014 (2), 2014 [A], 2016	3	0	1
4	(Canada) Ari Engel	3	1	0	0	0	2019, 2021, 2023 [O], 2024 [O]	2	2	0
4	(United States) Chad Eveslage	1	0	0	0	3	2022, 2023 (2), 2025	4	0	0
4	(United States) Alex Foxen	3	1	0	0	0	2022, 2024 [O], 2024 [P], 2026	2	1	1
4	(Belgium) Michael Gathy	4	0	0	0	0	2012, 2013, 2016, 2020 [O]	3	1	0
4	(United States) Kevin Gerhart	0	2	0	1	1	2019, 2020 [O], 2021 (2)	3	1	0
4	(United States) Mike (Harthcock) Hart	1	0	0	3	0	1984, 1990, 1991, 1994	4	0	0
4	(United States) Phil Hui	0	2	0	0	2	2014, 2019, 2022, 2024	4	0	0
4	(United States) Ian Johns	3	0	0	0	1	2006, 2016 (2), 2025	4	0	0
4	(United States) Loren Klein	0	2	0	0	2	2016, 2017, 2018, 2019	4	0	0
4	(United States) Chance Kornuth	3	1	0	0	0	2010, 2018o, 2021, 2024	3	1	0
4	(United States) Lakewood Louie	0	0	3	1	0	1978, 1979 (2), 1980	4	0	0
4	(France) Julien Martini	1	1	0	1	1	2018, 2021 [E] (2), 2022	2	0	2
4	(Russia) Artur Martirosian	4	0	0	0	0	2023 [O], 2023 [P], 2025, 2026	2	1	1
4	(United States) Mike Matusow	1	1	1	1	0	1999, 2002, 2008, 2013	4	0	0
4	(United States) Tom McEvoy	2	1	0	1	0	**1983** (2), 1986, 1992	4	0	0
4	(Germany) Dominik Nitsche	4	0	0	0	0	2012, 2014 [C], 2014, 2017 [E]	2	0	2
4	(United States) Walter "Puggy" Pearson	2	0	0	2	0	1971, **1973** (3)	4	0	0
4	(Italy) Max Pescatori	1	0	0	2	1	2006, 2008, 2015 (2)	4	0	0
4	(United States) Thomas "Amarillo Slim" Preston	2	2	0	0	0	**1972**, 1974, 1985, 1990	4	0	0
4	(Canada) Mark Radoja	4	0	0	0	0	2011, 2013, 2022 [O], 2025 [O]	2	2	0
4	(United States) Joshua Remitio	4	0	0	0	0	2024o, 2024 [O], 2025o (2)	0	4	0
4	(United States) Tom Schneider	0	0	0	1	3	2007 (2), 2013 (2)	4	0	0
4	(United States) Huck Seed	1	1	0	2	0	1994, **1996**, 2000, 2003	4	0	0
4	(Brazil) João Simão	2	1	0	0	1	2021 [O], 2022, 2025 [P], 2026	2	1	1
4	(Greece) Georgios Sotiropoulos	4	0	0	0	0	2015 [E], 2021 [O], 2021, 2024o	1	2	1
4	(United States) Sam Soverel	2	2	0	0	0	2016, 2023o, 2025, 2025 [P]	2	1	1
4	(Portugal) João Vieira	4	0	0	0	0	2019, 2022, 2023 [O], 2025	3	1	0
4	(United States) Ben Yu	3	0	1	0	0	2015, 2017, 2018, 2021	4	0	0
4	(United States) Daniel Zack	0	2	1	1	0	2019, 2022 (2), 2025	4	0	0
3	(Spain) Sergio Aido	3	0	0	0	0	2024, 2024 [O], 2026 [O]	1	2	0
3	(Italy) Simone Andrian	3	0	0	0	0	2021 [E], 2024 [O], **2024 [E]**	0	1	2
3	(United States) David Bach	0	0	0	0	3	2009, 2017 (2)	3	0	0
3	(United States) David "Bakes" Baker	0	0	2	0	1	2010, 2012, 2021	3	0	0
3	(Israel) Eli Balas	2	1	0	0	0	1992, 1999, 2004	3	0	0
3	(United States) Lyle Berman	1	1	1	0	0	1989, 1992, 1994	3	0	0
3	(United States) John Bonetti	1	0	2	0	0	1990, 1993, 1995	3	0	0
3	(United States) Justin Bonomo	3	0	0	0	0	2014, 2018 (2)	3	0	0
3	(United States) Dutch Boyd	3	0	0	0	0	2006, 2010, 2014	3	0	0
3	(United States) Jimmy Casella	0	0	0	3	0	1971, 1974 (2)	3	0	0
3	(United States) John Cernuto	1	1	0	1	0	1996, 1997, 2002	3	0	0
3	(United States) Daniel Chan	3	0	0	0	0	2023 [O] (2), 2024o	0	3	0
3	(United States) Paul Clark	0	0	0	3	0	1992, 1999, 2002	3	0	0
3	(United States) Jim Collopy	0	2	0	0	1	2013 [A], 2021, 2023	2	0	1
3	(United States) Joey Couden	1	1	0	0	1	2018, 2025, 2026	3	0	0
3	(United States) Jason Daly	1	1	0	0	1	2023, 2025, 2026	3	0	0
3	(Iran) Hamid Dastmalchi	3	0	0	0	0	1986, **1992**, 1993	3	0	0
3	(Sri Lanka) Upeshka De Silva	3	0	0	0	0	2015, 2017, 2019o	2	1	0
3	(South Korea) Nani Dollison	2	0	0	0	1	2000, 2001 (2)	3	0	0
3	(United States) Dash Dudley	1	2	0	0	0	2019, 2019 [E], 2022	2	0	1
3	(Canada) Jonathan Duhamel	3	0	0	0	0	**2010**, 2015, 2015 [E]	2	0	1
3	(United States) Tony Dunst	3	0	0	0	0	2016, 2020 [O], 2024o	1	2	0
3	(United States) Barbara Enright	1	0	0	2	0	1986, 1994, 1996	3	0	0
3	(United States) Ryan Eriquezzo	3	0	0	0	0	2012 [C], 2019 [C], 2023o	0	1	2
3	(United States) Antonio Esfandiari	3	0	0	0	0	2004, 2012, 2012 [E]	2	0	1
3	(Lebanon) Sam Farha	0	3	0	0	0	1996, 2006, 2010	3	0	0
3	(United States) Michael Gagliano	3	0	0	0	0	2016, 2022 [O], 2023 [O]	1	2	0
3	(United States) Phil Galfond	0	2	1	0	0	2008, 2015, 2018	3	0	0
3	(Spain) Antonio Galiana	3	0	0	0	0	2024, 2025, 2026 [O]	2	1	0
3	(United States) Nathan Gamble	0	3	0	0	0	2017, 2020 [O], 2026	2	1	0
3	(Vietnam) Chau Giang	0	2	1	0	0	1993, 1998, 2004	3	0	0
3	(United States) Perry Green	1	0	2	0	0	1976, 1977, 1979	3	0	0
3	(United States) Barry Greenstein	0	1	1	1	0	2004, 2005, 2008	3	0	0
3	(United States) Zachary Gruneberg	2	1	0	0	0	2023 [O], 2024o, 2026	1	2	0
3	(United States) Nick Guagenti	2	0	0	1	0	2020 [O], 2024, 2025	2	1	0
3	(United States) Dan Heimiller	1	0	0	1	1	2002, 2014, 2025	3	0	0
3	(United States) Ryan Hughes	1	0	0	2	0	2007, 2008, 2023o	2	1	0
3	(Canada) Dan Idema	1	0	0	1	1	2011, 2013, 2015	3	0	0
3	(India) Nipun Java	3	0	0	0	0	2017, 2017o, 2023o	1	2	0
3	(United States) Marco Johnson	2	0	0	0	1	2013, 2016, 2026	3	0	0
3	(United States) Frank Kassela	0	0	1	2	0	2010 (2), 2017	3	0	0
3	(United States) Jack Keller	1	1	0	1	0	**1984** (2), 1993	3	0	0
3	(Japan) Naoya Kihara	0	1	1	1	0	2012, 2026 (2)	3	0	0
3	(Belgium) Davidi Kitai	3	0	0	0	0	2008, 2013, 2014	3	0	0
3	(Lithuania) Marius Kudzmanas	3	0	0	0	0	2023 [O], 2024 [O], **2026 [E]**	0	2	1
3	(United States) Ryan Leng	2	0	0	0	1	2018, 2021 [O], 2021	2	1	0
3	(United States) Dylan Linde	1	2	0	0	0	2021, 2024 [O], 2025	2	1	0
3	(United States) O'Neil Longson	0	1	1	1	0	1994, 2003, 2005	3	0	0
3	(United States) Kyle Lorenz	3	0	0	0	0	2022 [O], 2024o, 2024 [O]	0	3	0
3	(China) Xixiang Luo	0	1	0	0	2	2024 (2), 2025	3	0	0
3	(Israel) Timur Margolin	3	0	0	0	0	2018, 2018 [E], 2024	2	0	1
3	(Greece) Sam Mastrogiannis	0	0	0	3	0	1979, 1986 (2)	3	0	0
3	(United States) Matt Matros	3	0	0	0	0	2010, 2011, 2012	3	0	0
3	(Sweden) Simon Eric Mattsson	3	0	0	0	0	**2022 [O]**, 2024 [O], 2025 [O]	0	3	0
3	(United States) Joe McKeehen	3	0	0	0	0	**2015**, 2017, 2020 [O]	2	1	0
3	(Canada) Greg Mueller	2	0	0	0	1	2009 (2), 2019	3	0	0
3	(United States) Frankie O'Dell	0	3	0	0	0	2003, 2007, 2019	3	0	0
3	(United States) Qinghai Pan	2	0	0	1	0	2022 [O], 2023 [O], 2025	1	2	0
3	(United States) Brock Parker	2	1	0	0	0	2009 (2), 2014	3	0	0
3	(Finland) Eelis Parssinen	0	1	0	0	2	2021, 2026 (2)	3	0	0
3	(Vietnam) David Pham	2	0	0	0	1	2001, 2006, 2017	3	0	0
3	(United States) Shankar Pillai	3	0	0	0	0	2007, 2019, 2021 [O]	2	1	0
3	(United States) Doug Polk	3	0	0	0	0	2014, 2016, 2017	3	0	0
3	(Latvia) Aleksejs Ponakovs	3	0	0	0	0	2021o, 2022, 2025 [P]	1	1	1
3	(United States) Rep Porter	1	0	0	2	0	2008, 2011, 2016	3	0	0
3	(United States) David Prociak	1	0	1	1	0	2016, 2024, 2024o	2	1	0
3	(United States) John Racener	2	0	0	0	1	2017, 2024, 2025	3	0	0
3	(United States) David "Chip" Reese	0	0	0	2	1	1978, 1982, 2006	3	0	0
3	(United States) Vanessa Selbst	1	1	0	0	1	2008, 2012, 2014	3	0	0
3	(United States) Hilbert Shirey	2	1	0	0	0	1987, 1995 (2)	3	0	0
3	(United States) David Sklansky	1	1	1	0	0	1982 (2), 1983	3	0	0
3	(Bulgaria) Simeon Spasov	3	0	0	0	0	2022, 2024, 2026o	2	1	0
3	(Costa Rica) Max Stern	1	1	0	1	0	1995, 1997 (2)	3	0	0
3	(India) Santhosh Suvarna	3	0	0	0	0	2023 [E], 2024, 2026	2	0	1
3	(Hungary) Norbert Szecsi	2	0	0	0	1	2013, 2018 [E], 2022o	1	1	1
3	(United States) Dewey Tomko	1	1	1	0	0	1979, 1984 (2)	3	0	0
3	(United States) Sean Troha	0	3	0	0	0	2022, 2023, 2024	3	0	0
3	(Hong Kong) Anson Tsang	1	2	0	0	0	2018 [E], 2020 [O], 2022 [E]	0	1	2
3	(Greece) Peter Vilandos	3	0	0	0	0	1995, 2009, 2012	3	0	0
3	(United States) Christopher Vitch	0	1	1	1	0	2016, 2017, 2024	3	0	0
3	(United States) Paul Volpe	0	1	1	0	1	2014, 2016, 2018	3	0	0
3	(United States) Michael Wang	2	1	0	0	0	2015, 2022, 2025	3	0	0
3	(Germany) Dennis Weiss	1	2	0	0	0	2024 [E], 2025, 2026	2	0	1
3	(United States) Don Williams	0	0	0	3	0	1982, 1985, 1988	3	0	0
3	(United States) Jesse Yaginuma	3	0	0	0	0	2022 [O], 2023 [O], 2024 [O], ~~2025~~	0	3	0
3	(United States) Bryce Yockey	0	2	0	0	1	2017, 2024, 2026	3	0	0

Bracelets	Player	Year(s)
2	(India) Aditya Agarwal	2024, 2025o
2	(United States) Steve Albini	2018, 2022
2	(Germany) Koray Aldemir	**2021**, 2025 [P]
2	(United States) Richard Alsup	2022, 2026
2	(Israel) Rafi Amit	2005, 2007
2	(United States) Howard Andrew	1976 (2)
2	(United States) Sam Angel	1973, 1975
2	(Netherlands) Jans Arends	2022 [O], 2023
2	(United Kingdom) Richard Ashby	2010, 2024
2	(United States) Eric Baldwin	2009, 2018
2	(United States) Scott Ball	2021 (2)
2	(United States) Ryan Bambrick	2018, 2025
2	(United States) Michael Banducci	2008, 2025o
2	(United Kingdom) Praz Bansi	2006, 2010
2	(United States) David Baxter	1983, 1986
2	(United States) Jim Bechtel	**1993**, 2019
2	(United States) Tanner Bibat	2022 [O] (2)
2	(United States) Steve Billirakis	2007, 2011 [E]
2	(United States) Ted Binion	1983, 1985
2	(United States) Nick Binger	2011, 2020 [O]
2	(Switzerland) Emil Bise	2021 [E], 2022 [E]
2	(Sweden) Chris Björin	1997, 2000
2	(United Kingdom) Barny Boatman	2013, 2015 [E]
2	(Ukraine) Renat Bohdanov	2019 [E], 2025
2	(United States) Scott Bohlman	2018, 2025
2	(United States) Buddy Bonnecaze	1992, 1993
2	(United States) Rami Boukai	2009, 2019
2	(United States) Burt Boutin	2001, 2007
2	(Canada) Andre Boyer	2005, 2015
2	(United States) Lawrence Brandt	2022 (2)
2	(United States) Chris Brewer	2023 (2)
2	(Costa Rica) Humberto Brenes	1993 (2)
2	(United States) Starla Brodie	1979, 1995
2	(Israel) Yuval Bronshtein	2019, 2021
2	(United States) Tyler Brown	2023, 2025
2	(United States) Eric Buchman	2010, 2014
2	(Australia) Kahle Burns	2019 [E] (2)
2	(Australia) Robert Campbell	2019 (2)
2	(United States) Brandon Cantu	2006, 2009
2	(United States) Dick Carson	1983, 1985
2	(United States) Brent Carter	1991, 1994
2	(United States) Daniel "Jungleman" Cates	2021, 2022
2	(United States) Allen Chang	2020 [O], 2021 [O]
2	(China) Dong Chen	2023 [P], 2026
2	(Taiwan) Pete Chen	2021o, 2022 [O]
2	(United States) William Chen	2006 (2)
2	(United Kingdom) Stephen Chidwick	2019, 2024 [P]
2	(United States) Thomas Chung	1989, 1991
2	(United States) Maxx Coleman	2022, 2022 [O]
2	(United States) Hoyt Corkins	1992, 2007
2	(United Kingdom) Robert Cowen	2021, 2022
2	(United States) Aaron Cummings	2024, 2025
2	(Bulgaria) Dimitar Danchev	2022 [O], 2026
2	(United States) Mark Darner	2025, 2025 [P]
2	(United States) Aubrey Day	1973, 1978
2	(Lebanon) Freddy Deeb	1996, 2007
2	(United States) Jason DeWitt	2010, 2016
2	(France) Ivan Deyra	2019, 2024 [O]
2	(Bulgaria) Ognyan Dimov	2018, 2023 [O]
2	(Italy) Ermanno Di Nicola	2023 [E], 2024 [E]
2	(Vietnam) Quinn Do	2005, 2015
2	(United States) Jim Doman	1982, 1983
2	(New Zealand) David Dong Ming Yan	2022 [O], 2023 [O]
2	(United States) Connor Drinan	2020 [O], 2021
2	(United States) Braxton Dunaway	2023, 2026
2	(Canada) Daniel Dvoress	2020 [O], 2023 [E]
2	(United States) David Eldridge	2021o, 2024
2	(Sweden) Omar Eljach	**2022 [E]**, 2023 [E]
2	(United States) Todd Estes	2022o, 2023o
2	(United States) Justin Fawcett	2025, 2026
2	(United States) Tommy Fischer	1985, 1986
2	(United States) Scott Fischman	2004 (2)
2	(United States) Gene Fisher	1980, 1993
2	(United States) Elio Fox	**2011 [E]**, 2018
2	(United States) Andy Frankenberger	2011, 2012
2	(United States) Eric Froehlich	2005, 2006
2	(United States) Frank Funaro	2022 [O], 2024
2	(United States) Caleb "Bruno" Furth	2024, 2025
2	(United Kingdom) John Gale	2006, 2015
2	(Canada) Joseph Gao	2025 [O] (2)
2	(Israel) Ravid Garbi	2020 [O], 2025 [O]
2	(United States) Lou Garza	2023, 2025
2	(United States) Arash Ghaneian	2015, 2024
2	(Brazil) Dante Goya	2023 [P], 2025 [O]
2	(United States) Matt Graham	2008, 2009
2	(United States) Matt Grapenthien	2014, 2026
2	(United States) David Grey	1999, 2005
2	(France) Bertrand "ElkY" Grospellier	2011, 2019 [E]
2	(France) Roger Hairabedian	2012 [E], 2013 [E]
2	(Norway) Thor Hansen	1988, 2002
2	(United States) Jennifer Harman	2000, 2002
2	(United States) Dan Harrington	**1995** (2)
2	(Israel) Ori Hasson	2022 [O], 2026
2	(Germany) Konstantin Held	2024 [O], 2025o
2	(Finland) Juha Helppi	2019, 2020 [O]
2	(United States) Mark Herm	2021 [O], 2021o
2	(United States) Tyler Hirschfeld	2024 [O], 2025 [O]
2	(Canada) Randy Holland	1996, 2000
2	(United States) Mike Holtz	2022 [O], 2026
2	(Germany) Fedor Holz	2016, 2020 [O]
2	(Denmark) Jesper Hougaard	2008, 2008 [E]
2	(United States) Loni (Harwood) Hui	2013, 2015 [C]
2	(United States) Susie Isaacs	1996, 1997
2	(United States) David Jackson	2021 [O], 2022
2	(Norway) Espen Jørstad	**2022** (2)
2	(United States) Cliff Josephy	2005, 2013
2	(Australia) Mel Judah	1989, 1997
2	(United Kingdom) John Kabbaj	2009, 2014
2	(United States) Matt Keikoan	2008, 2010
2	(United States) Dan Kelly	2010, 2014
2	(United Kingdom) J. P. Kelly	2009, 2009 [E]
2	(United States) Bryn Kenney	2014, 2024 [O]
2	(United States) Chris Klodnicki	2017, 2023
2	(Germany) Maximilian Klostermeier	2019, 2021 [E]
2	(Bulgaria) Boris Kolev	2021, 2023 [P]
2	(Bulgaria) Yuliyan Kolev	2021o, 2022
2	(United States) Jason Koon	2021, 2025
2	(United States) Tom Koral	2017, 2019
2	(Ukraine) Oleksii Kovalchuk	2011, 2012
2	(Italy) Alessio La Francesca	2026 [O] (2)
2	(United States) Ben Lamb	2011, 2023
2	(United States) Justin Lapka	2021 [O], 2023 [O]
2	(Germany) Jonas Lauck	2019, 2022 [O]
2	(United States) Michael Lavin	2021 [O], 2025
2	(Greece) Vasilis Lazarou	1990, 1997
2	(United States) Daniel Lazrus	2021 [O], 2021
2	(United States) Allan Le	2016, 2025
2	(United States) Tommy Le	2017, 2021
2	(Vietnam) Tuan Le	2014, 2015
2	(Canada) Mike Leah	2014 [A], 2026 [E]
2	(United States) Rafael Lebron	2016, 2021
2	(United States) Michael Lech	2020 [O], 2024 [O]
2	(United States) Howard Lederer	2000, 2001
2	(United States) Keith Lehr	2003, 2015
2	(United States) Justin Liberto	2015, 2026
2	(United States) Erick Lindgren	2008, 2013
2	(Canada) Alex Livingston	2022, 2024
2	(United Kingdom) Harry Lodge	2022o, 2025o
2	(United States) Jesse Lonis	2022 [O], 2023
2	(Germany) Manig Löser	2021 [O], 2022o
2	(United States) John Lukas	1983, 1985
2	(United States) Hans "Tuna" Lund	1978, 1996
2	(Russia) Vitaly Lunkin	2008, 2009
2	(Vietnam) Thang Luu	2008, 2009
2	(Ukraine) Andriy Lyubovetskiy	2021 [E], 2022 [E]
2	(Vietnam) Tony Ma	1996, 2000
2	(United States) Kevin MacPhee	2015, **2015 [E]**
2	(Bulgaria) Stoyan Madanzhiev	**2020 [O]**, 2025o
2	(United States) Nick Maimone	2020 [O], 2025o
2	(China) Renji Mao	2023, 2025 [E]
2	(United States) Jesse Martin	2013, 2017
2	(United States) Dong Meng	2023, 2024 [C]
2	(United States) Michael Mercaldo	2021 [O], 2022 [O]
2	(United States) Greg Merson	**2012** (2)
2	(United States) Ryan Miller	2023 (2)
2	(Italy) Nicolo Molinelli	2020 [O], 2021 [O]
2	(United States) Michael Moncek	2022, 2023
2	(United States) James Moore	2016, 2017
2	(United Kingdom) Chris Moorman	2017, 2021 [O]
2	(United States) Gerald Morrell	2023 [O], 2024 [O]
2	(Ecuador) Juan Carlos Mortensen	**2001**, 2003
2	(United States) Ralph Morton	1982, 1987
2	(United States) Abe Mosseri	2009, 2017
2	(Bulgaria) Fahredin Mustafov	2025 [O], 2026 [E]
2	(United States) A.J. Myers	1980, 1981
2	(Romania) Darius Neagoe	2024 [E], 2025 [E]
2	(Vietnam) Minh Nguyen	2003, 2004
2	(Vietnam) Phi Nguyen	2003, 2004
2	(Australia) James Obst	2017, 2024
2	(United States) Drew O'Connell	2021 [O], 2022 [O]
2	(Japan) Shiina Okamoto	2024, 2025
2	(Romania) Alexandru Papazian	2017, 2021 [O]
2	(United States) Rodney H. Pardey	1991, 1994
2	(United States) Tyler Patterson	2014, 2025
2	(United States) Taylor Paur	2013, 2019o
2	(United States) Justin Pechie	2011, 2022
2	(United Kingdom) Matt Perrins	2011, 2013
2	(Netherlands) Tobias Peters	2023 [E], 2025 [E]
2	(United States) Nick Petrangelo	2015, 2018
2	(Vietnam) John Phan	2008 (2)
2	(United States) Carter Phillips	2010, 2012
2	(United States) Bryan Piccioli	2013 [A], 2021 [O]
2	(Italy) Alessandro Pichierri	2021 [E], 2024 [E]
2	(Hong Kong) Wing Po Liu	2023 [E], 2024
2	(United States) Pat Poels	2005, 2006
2	(United States) Josh Pollock	2013, 2019o
2	(Greece) Athanasios Polychronopoulos	2011, 2013
2	(United States) Sandeep Pulusani	2013, 2022
2	(United States) Darren Rabinowitz	2023 [O], 2026
2	(France) Alexandre Reard	2021, 2023
2	(United States) James Richburg	2006, 2007
2	(United States) John Riordan	2023 [O] (2)
2	(United States) Dody Roach	1981, 1996
2	(United States) Bryan "Sailor" Roberts	1974, **1975**
2	(Germany) Benjamin Rolle	**2025 [O]**, 2026 [O]
2	(United States) William Romaine	2020 [O], 2022 [O]
2	(United States) Ray Rumler	1990, 1992
2	(United States) Justin Saliba	2021 [O], 2022 [O]
2	(United States) Evan Sandberg	2022 [O], 2024o
2	(North Macedonia) Ilija Savevski	2022 [E], 2024o
2	(Germany) Eddy Scharf	2001, 2003
2	(Germany) Ole Schemion	2021, 2026 [E]
2	(United States) Brek Schutten	2024, 2025o
2	(Germany) Claas Segebrecht	2022 [O] (2)
2	(Egypt) Mark Seif	2005 (2)
2	(United States) Brandon Shack-Harris	2014, 2016
2	(United States) Brett Shaffer	2013, 2014
2	(Russia) Vladimir Shchemelev	2013, 2017
2	(United States) Shannon Shorr	2023 [O] (2)
2	(United States) Barry Shulman	2001, **2009 [E]**
2	(United States) Marty Sigel	1993, 1996
2	(United States) David Singer	2008, 2017
2	(United Kingdom) Elior Sion	2017, 2023 [O]
2	(Denmark) Jan Vang Sørensen	2002, 2005
2	(United States) Christopher Staats	2022 [O], 2025
2	(Canada) Alek Stasiak	2020 [O] (2)
2	(United States) Jack Straus	1973, **1982**
2	(Russia) Denis Strebkov	2019, 2021
2	(United States) Daniel Strelitz	2019, 2022
2	(South Korea) Steve Sung	2009, 2013
2	(Japan) Ryutaro Suzuki	2023, 2025
2	(United States) Corey Thompson	2016, 2025o
2	(Austria) Hanh Tran	2018, 2018 [E]
2	(Vietnam) J. C. Tran	2008, 2009
2	(Mexico) Luis Velador	2008, 2010
2	(United States) David Warga	2002, 2010
2	(United States) Mike Wattel	1999, 2017
2	(United States) Daniel Weinman	2022, **2023**
2	(United States) Dylan Weisman	2021, 2024
2	(Canada) Benjamin Wilinofsky	2023 [O], 2023o [P]
2	(United States) Jeremiah Williams	2021 [O], 2022 [O]
2	(United States) Brandon Wittmeyer	2015, 2024o
2	(United States) Steven Wolansky	2014, 2016
2	(Israel) Amit Ben Yacov	2023 [O], 2024 [O]
2	(United States) Ethan "Rampage" Yau	2020 [O], 2026o
2	(Russia) Dmitry Yurasov	2017, 2021 [O]
2	(United States) Benjamin Zamani	2015, 2017
2	(United States) Martin Zamani	2021 [O], 2021o
2	(Greece) Ourania Zarkantzia	2022 [O], 2024 [O]
2	(Czech Republic) Lukas Zaskodny	2017 [E], 2025
2	(Slovenia) Blaz Zerjav	2025 (2)
2	(Russia) Andrey Zhigalov	2018, 2025
2	(Russia) Viacheslav Zhukov	2011, 2012
2	(United States) Steve Zolotow	1995, 2001
2	(Russia) Anatolii Zyrin	2019, 2021

=== List by country ===
Correct as of 29 September 2026 (minus review of 2025 WSOP Online and 2026 WSOP Online)
Note: the numbers "by country" do not include players who have won only 1 bracelet.

Country	Players	Player(s) with most bracelets
United States	258	Phil Hellmuth (17)
Canada	15	Daniel Negreanu (8)
Germany	13	George Danzer (4); Dominik Nitsche (4)
United Kingdom	13	Benny Glaser (8)
Vietnam	12	Men Nguyen (7)
Israel	9	Eli Elezra (5); Asi Moshe (5)
Russia	9	Mike Gorodinsky (5)
Bulgaria	7	Simeon Spasov (3)
Australia	6	Jeff Lisandro (6)
Greece	6	Georgios Sotiropoulos (4)
Italy	6	Max Pescatori (4)
France	5	Julien Martini (4)
China	4	David Chiu (5)
Brazil	3	Yuri Dzivielevski (6)
India	3	Nipun Java (3); Santhosh Suvarna (3)
Japan	3	Naoya Kihara (3)

Country	Players	Player(s) with most bracelets
Spain	3	Adrián Mateos (6)
Sweden	3	Simon Eric Mattsson (3)
Ukraine	3	Renat Bohdanov (2); Oleksii Kovalchuk (2); Andriy Lyubovetskiy (2)
Belgium	2	Michael Gathy (4)
Costa Rica	2	Max Stern (3)
Czechia	2	Martin Kabrhel (6)
Denmark	2	Jesper Hougaard (2); Jan Vang Sørensen (2)
Finland	2	Eelis Parssinen (3)
Iran	2	Farzad Bonyadi (4)
Lebanon	2	Sam Farha (3)
Netherlands	2	Jans Arends (2); Tobias Peters (2)
Norway	2	Thor Hansen (2); Espen Jørstad (2)
Romania	2	Darius Neagoe (2); Alexandru Papazian (2)
South Korea	2	Nani Dollison (3)

Country	Players	Player with most bracelets
Austria	1	Hanh Tran (2)
Ecuador	1	Juan Carlos Mortensen (2)
Egypt	1	Mark Seif (2)
Hong Kong	1	Anson Tsang (3)
Hungary	1	Norbert Szecsi (3)
Indonesia	1	John Juanda (5)
Latvia	1	Aleksejs Ponakovs (3)
Lithuania	1	Marius Kudzmanas (3)
Mexico	1	Luis Velador (2)
New Zealand	1	David Dong Ming Yan (2)
North Macedonia	1	Ilija Savevski (2)
Portugal	1	João Vieira (4)
Slovenia	1	Blaz Zerjav (2)
Sri Lanka	1	Upeshka De Silva (3)
Switzerland	1	Emil Bise (2)
Taiwan	1	Pete Chen (2)
