= Poker bracelet =

Poker bracelet may refer to:

- World Series of Poker bracelet, awarded to the winner of every event at the annual World Series of Poker
  - World Series of Poker multiple bracelet winners
- World Poker Tour bracelet
