= John Bouzalas =

Greek poker player (born 1982)

- Ιωαννης Μπουζαλας
- Born: 12 September 1982 (age 42)
- Occupation: Poker player

John Yiannis Bouzalas (Ιωαννης Μπουζαλας; born 12 September 1982) is a Greek professional poker player who has twice won first place in Greek Poker Tournaments and once in the Greek Poker Championship among other notable performances. His name is often spelled as Ioannis or Yiannis / Giannis Mpouzalas.

== Poker career ==
Bouzalas has won three major poker tournaments:

- 5th Greek Poker Tournament - 1st Place
- 2nd Greek Poker Championship - 1st Place
- 1st Greek Poker Championship - 1st Place

Bouzalas attended the 2009 World Series of Poker Europe main event in London but never made it to the final table as Daniel Negreanu lost to Barry Shulman

In November 2009 Bouzalas covered the Card Player Magazine (Greece) which included his longest interview yet.
