= 2009 World Series of Poker Europe =

Series of poker tournaments

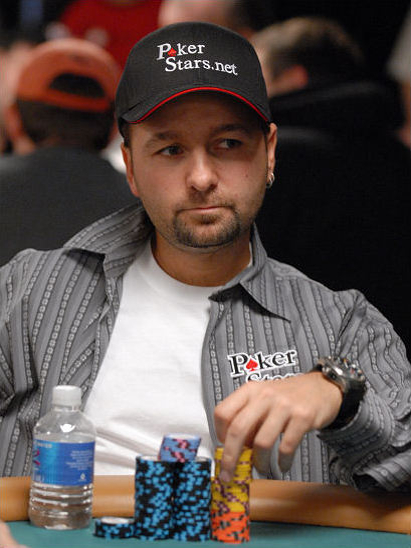
Daniel Negreanu topped the all-time WSOP winnings list after coming second in the 2009 WSOPE Main Event

The World Series of Poker Europe (WSOPE) is the first expansion effort of World Series of Poker-branded poker tournaments outside the United States. Since 1970, participants have had to travel to Las Vegas if they wanted to compete in the World Series of Poker (WSOP). Although the WSOP held circuit events in other locations, the main tournaments, which awarded bracelets to the winners, were exclusively held in Las Vegas. The inaugural WSOPE, held in 2007, marked the first time that a WSOP bracelet was awarded outside Las Vegas.

In 2004, Harrah's Casinos purchased the rights to the WSOP label. Harrah's later purchased London Clubs International (LCI). LCI operates three casinos in the London area: Fifty, Leicester Square, and The Sportsman. After the purchase of these casinos, Harrah's decided to expand its WSOP label into Europe. European casinos typically have a different environment than those in the U.S. Jeffrey Pollack, the WSOP Commissioner, indicated that the WSOPE would have a "style and flair that is both unique and appropriate to the setting. So don't be surprised if we require participants to wear blazers at the tables. If James Bond were hosting a poker tournament it may look like the World Series of Poker Europe."

In marketing the WSOPE, Harrah's Casino did not rely upon the reputation of Harrah's or the WSOP alone. On 5 July 2007, Harrah's announced its alliance with England-based Betfair, one of the largest online gaming companies in the world. The agreement, the largest-ever union of an online and offline gaming company, is intended to build on Betfair's European reputation in advertising the WSOPE. Due to changes in U.S. laws, effective in 2007, the WSOP could no longer accept money from online gambling companies. This prevented the WSOP from acknowledging WSOP qualifiers from online events. The WSOPE is not bound by this limitation. The United Kingdom Gambling Act of 2005 allows for legal regulated online poker sites. Furthermore, as the laws that govern the age of gambling differ in England than the U.S., the WSOPE admits younger players. In 2007, one of these younger players, 18-year-old Annette "Annette_15" Obrestad became the youngest player to win a WSOP bracelet event.

The third WSOPE took place between 17 September and 1 October 2009. It consisted of four events held at the Casino at the Empire in Leicester Square, London. The first event saw J.P. Kelly emerge as the winner of a less-than-an-hour long heads up battle, overcoming a 3-to-1 chip deficit against Fabien Dunlop and earning his second World Series of Poker bracelet of the year. Kelly won most of his final chip stack in a flush-over-flush situation, leaving Dunlop with only 1% of chips in play. In the second event, Erik Cajelais easily defeated runner-up Mats Gavatin after entering the heads up phase with an almost 6-to-1 chip lead. The third event saw Finnish Full Tilt Poker pro Jani Vilmunen defeat Howard Lederer, the owner of Full Tilt brand, over the course of a 90-minute-long match with nearly even stacks. The Main Event featured a heated battle between Barry Shulman and Daniel Negreanu that lasted over five hours before Shulman eventually eliminated Negreanu by hitting a three-of-a-kind on the river. However, even in second place, Negreanu still topped the All Time Money List, the list of WSOP players ranked by total winnings.

== Key ==
*	Elected to the Poker Hall of Fame
(#/#)	This denotes a bracelet winner. The first number is the number of bracelets won in 2009. The second number is the total number of bracelets won. Both numbers represent totals as of that point during the tournament.
Place	What place each player finished
Name	The player who made it to the final table
Prize (£)	The amount of money, in British Pounds (£), awarded for each finish at the event's final table

== Results ==
=== Event 1: £1,000 No Limit Hold'em ===
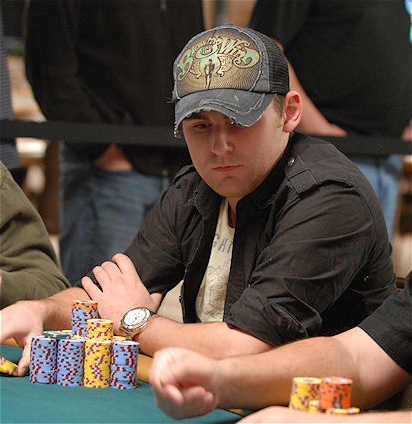
J.P. Kelly on the final table of Event 1

- 4-Day Event: 17 September 2009 to 21 September 2009
- Number of buy-ins: 608
- Total Prize Pool: £608,000
- Number of Payouts: 63
- Winning Hand: Q♦ J♥

Final Table
Place	Name	Prize
1st	J.P. Kelly (2/2)	£136,803
2nd	Fabien Dunlop	£84,512
3rd	Adnan Alshamah	£55,468
4th	Richard Allen	£38,499
5th	Anthony Roux	£28,181
6th	Neil Suarez	£21,700
7th	William Martin	£17,535
8th	Thor Drexel	£14,835
9th	James Tomlin	£13,115

=== Event 2: £2,500 Pot Limit Hold'em/Omaha ===
- 3-Day Event: 21 September 2009 to 23 September 2009
- Number of buy-ins: 158
- Total Prize Pool: £395,000
- Number of Payouts: 18
- Winning Hand: Q♥ J♦ 9♠ 7♠

Final Table
Place	Name	Prize
1st	Erik Cajelais (1/1)	£104,677
2nd	Mats Gavatin	£64,705
3rd	Robin Keston	£47,858
4th	Men Nguyen (0/6)	£35,412
5th	Richard Gryko	£26,619
6th	Chris Bjorin (0/2)	£20,106
7th	Hoyt Corkins (0/2)	£15,302
8th	Ian Frazer	£11,732
9th	Howard Lederer (0/2)	£9,117

=== Event 3: £5,000 Pot Limit Omaha ===
- 3-Day Event: 23 September 2009 to 25 September 2009
- Number of buy-ins: 154
- Total Prize Pool: £770,000
- Number of Payouts: 18
- Winning Hand: Q♠ 9♥ 7♥ 10♦

Final Table
Place	Name	Prize
1st	Jani Vilmunen (1/1)	£204,048
2nd	Howard Lederer (0/2)	£126,134
3rd	Aarno Kiveliö	£93,293
4th	Ross Boatman	£69,030
5th	Ville Haavisto	£51,890
6th	Daniel Hindin	£39,913
7th	Roberto Romanello	£29,830
8th	Jeff Kimber	£22,869
9th	Robert Williamson III (0/1)	£17,772

=== Event 4: £10,000 No Limit Hold'em ===
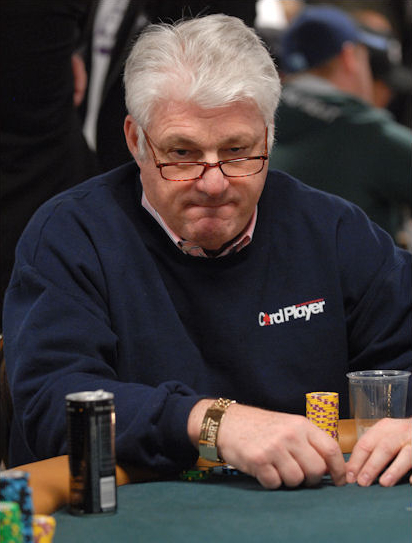
Barry Shulman playing 2008 World Series of Poker Europe

- 6-Day Event: 26 September 2009 to 1 October 2009
- Number of buy-ins: 334
- Total Prize Pool: £3,340,000
- Number of Payouts: 36
- Winning Hand: 10♠ 10♣

Final Table
Place	Name	Prize
1st	Barry Shulman (1/2)	£801,603
2nd	Daniel Negreanu (0/4)	£495,589
3rd	Praz Bansi (0/1)	£360,887
4th	Jason Mercier (1/1)	£267,267
5th	Markus Ristola	£200,367
6th	Chris Björin (0/2)	£150,267
7th	Antoine Saout	£114,228
8th	Matt Hawrilenko (1/1)	£87,074
9th	James Akenhead	£66,533
