= Anson Tsang =

Hong Kong poker player

Yan Shing "Anson" Tsang
- Nickname: Tara@0z

World Series of Poker
- Bracelets: 3
- Final tables: 14 (including unofficial)
- Money finishes: 111
- Highest WSOP Main Event finish: 404th, 2024

World Poker Tour
- Money finishes: 5

Anson Tsang (Chinese: 曾恩盛) is a Hong Kong semi-professional midstakes poker player active both on the online and the live arena.

As of October 2024, Tsang's total live tournament winnings exceeds $3,900,000. He rankes seventh among Hong Kong poker players in regard to all-time winnings.

== Career ==
Tsang's biggest score came in the 2013 Asia Millions Main Event cashing for $921,004 finishing 7th. Tsang finished second in a 2017 Asia Championship of Poker event for $201,181. Through playing in cash games, Tsang had won a significant sum by 2017. Beginning that year, he started to do increased global traveling to compete in poker competitions.

Tsang won the World Series of Poker bracelet in 2018. It was the first time a Hong Kong player had won the prize. Tsang finished first in €2,020 + 180 Pot Limit Omaha 8-Max (Event#7) for $105,428. He won his second World Series of Poker bracelet during the 2020 event. In the WSOP $500 Deepstack No-Limit Hold'em (Event #68), he finished first for $150,460. Tsang secured his third bracelet at the 2022 World Series of Poker in the €2,000 Pot Limit Omaha (Bracelet Event #4), finishing first for $94,525.

== Personal life ==
Tsang is married and has a daughter.
