= Lynn Gilmartin =

Australian television presenter (born 1984)

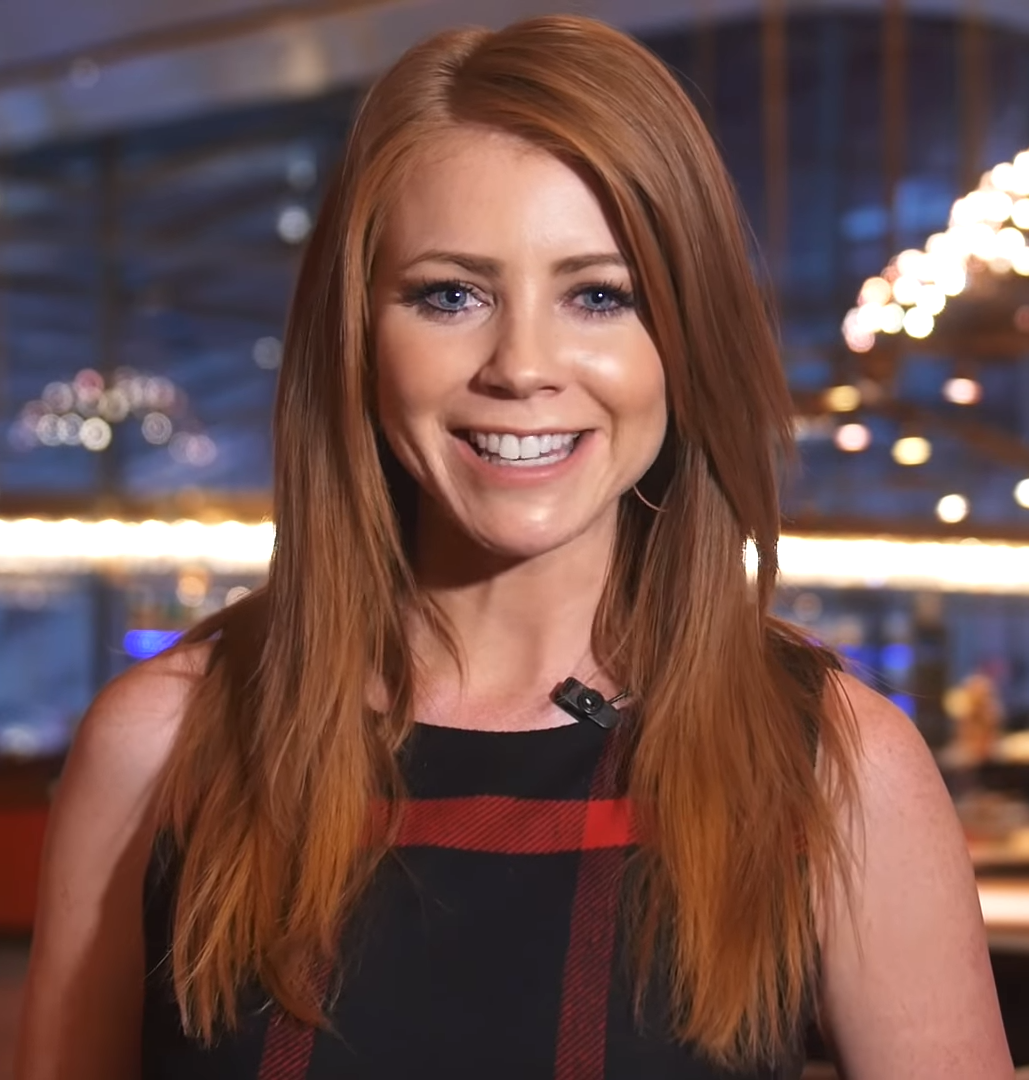
- Gilmartin in 2018
- Born: 3 November 1984 (age 41); Dublin, Ireland
- Education: La Trobe University, RMIT University
- Occupations: Actress, TV presenter
- Television: Neighbours; World Poker Tour; World Series of Poker Asia Pacific; Aussie Millions
- Spouse: Angel Guillén (2020-present)
- Children: 1
- Honours: Australian Poker Hall of Fame

Lynn Gilmartin (born 3 November 1984) is an Australian actress and TV host, best known as the anchor of the World Poker Tour on Fox Sports Networks (US). In 2020, she was inducted into The Australian Poker Hall of Fame.

== Personal life ==
Gilmartin is married to professional poker player and World Poker Tour Mexico commentator Angel Guillén.

== Career ==
Gilmartin began following the poker circuit in 2009 as a reporter for PokerNews and PokerStars.tv, regularly presenting from the World Series of Poker, European Poker Tour, Latin American Poker Tour and Asia Pacific Poker Tour.

She first hit Australian and UK television screens in 2012 as the host of Crown's Aussie Millions Poker Championship and continued into 2013 as sideline reporter for ESPN Australia's coverage of the World Series of Poker Asia Pacific, and One HD and ESPN Australia's coverage of Crown's Aussie Millions Poker Championship.

Later in 2013, Gilmartin moved to Los Angeles to assume the role as anchor of the World Poker Tour on Fox Sports Networks, alongside commentators Mike Sexton and Vince Van Patten. At the same time, Gilmartin also took the roles of anchor and producer of the World Poker Tour's high roller series, WPT Alpha8, on Fox Sports 1, alongside commentators Ali Nejad and Olivier Busquet.

Gilmartin featured on the December 2013 cover of Bluff magazine.

In February 2018, Gilmartin hosted the American Poker Awards.

In 2018, Gilmartin began her film career with the role of Gemma in the film Museo, which won a Silver Bear award for Best Screenplay at the Berlin International Film Festival. She has since appeared in Australian film productions, How Do You Know Chris?, The Very Excellent Mr. Dundee, Kidnapped and This Little Love of Mine.

In January 2020, Gilmartin was inducted into the Australian Poker Hall of Fame for her contributions to broadcasting for more than a decade.

Gilmartin had a guest role as Jessica Quince on Australian soap opera Neighbours from 23 April 2020.

== Filmography ==
=== Film ===
Year	Title	Role	Director
2024	Sleeping Dogs	Diane Lynch	Adam Cooper
2021	Christmas on the Farm	Clementine	Christopher Weekes
2021	This Little Love of Mine	Gem Bailey	Christine Luby
2021	Kidnapped	Gabby	Vic Sarin
2020	The Very Excellent Mr Dundee	TV Host	Dean Murphy
2020	How Do You Know Chris?	Dot	Ash Harris
2019	Trauma Center	Nurse Crystal	Matt Eskandari
2018	Museo	Gemma	Alonso Ruizpalacios

=== Television ===
Year	Title	Role	Network
2021	World Poker Tour - Season 19	Anchor	Bally Sports (USA)
2021	Dive Club	Pirate Queen	Network 10 (AU), Netflix (worldwide)
2020	Neighbours	Jessica Quince	Network 10 (AU), Channel 5 (UK)
2020	World Poker Tour - Season 18	Anchor	Fox Sports Networks
2019	World Poker Tour - Season 17	Anchor	Fox Sports Networks
2018	World Poker Tour - Season 16	Anchor	Fox Sports Networks
2017	World Poker Tour - Season 16	Anchor	Fox Sports Networks
2016	World Poker Tour - Season 15	Anchor	Fox Sports Networks
2015	World Poker Tour - Season 14	Anchor	Fox Sports Networks
2015	WPT Alpha 8 - Season 3	Anchor/Producer	FS1
2014	World Poker Tour - Season 13	Anchor	Fox Sports Networks
2014	WPT Alpha 8 - Season 2	Anchor/Producer	FS1
2013	World Poker Tour - Season 12	Anchor	Fox Sports Networks
2013	WPT Alpha 8 - Season 1	Anchor/Producer	FS1
2013	World Series of Poker Asia Pacific	Sideline Reporter	ESPN Australia
2013	Aussie Millions	Sideline Reporter	ESPN Australia & One HD
2012	Aussie Millions	Host	Channel 5 (UK)

== Poker ==
In 2015, Gilmartin won the largest-ever European Poker Tour Women's Event in Barcelona, Spain, securing an EPT trophy and a first-place prize of €5,890. The event had a record-breaking field size of 148 entries with a prize pool of €28,712.

In July 2017 Gilmartin made her first cash at the World Series of Poker in Las Vegas, finishing in 49th place in Event #70: $1,000 No Limit Hold'em - Ladies Championship for $2,301.

In January 2020, Gilmartin was inducted into the Australian Poker Hall of Fame. Speaking at her induction ceremony at Crown Melbourne, Gilmartin said, "This is a game that makes you smarter, wiser, more present, more in tune with yourself and with others. You learn life lessons by the orbit."

== Philanthropy ==
Gilmartin is an ambassador for WPT Foundation, hosting annual fundraising events for beneficiaries TGR Foundation, Children's Hospital of Philadelphia and Education Reform Now.

Gilmartin is a global ambassador for Wildlife Warriors. In an effort to support Australian wildlife during the 2020 bushfires, Gilmartin rallied poker players all over the world to donate more than A$100,000 to Wildlife Warriors.
