= 2014 World Series of Poker Asia Pacific =

2014 poker competition

The 2014 World Series of Poker Asia Pacific (WSOP APAC) was held from October 2-18 at Crown Casino in Melbourne, Australia. There were 10 bracelet events, culminating in a $10,000 Main Event and a $25,000 High Roller. This was the second edition of WSOP APAC, and the first under a new schedule which will see this event and WSOP Europe held in alternate years.

== Player of the Year ==
Final standings as of October 18 (end of WSOPAP):

Standings
Rank	Name	Points	Bracelets
1	(Germany) George Danzer	923.50	3
2	(United States) Brandon Shack-Harris	806.70	1
3	(United States) John Hennigan	557.88	1
4	(Canada) Daniel Negreanu	519.08	0
5	(Germany) Ismael Bojang	467.91	0
6	(United States) Daniel Colman	452.40	1
7	(United States) Justin Bonomo	449.63	1
8	(United Kingdom) Richard Ashby	413.55	0
9	(United States) Brock Parker	406.25	1
10	(United States) Calvin Anderson	398.20	1

== Key ==
*	Elected to the Poker Hall of Fame
(#/#)	This denotes a bracelet winner. The first number is the number of bracelets won in the 2014 WSOP. The second number is the total number of bracelets won. Both numbers represent totals as of that point during the tournament.
Place	What place each player at the final table finished
Name	The player who made it to the final table
Prize (AU$)	The amount of money awarded for each finish at the event's final table

== Results ==
=== Event #1: $1,100 No Limit Hold'em Accumulator ===
- 4-Day Event: October 2-5
- Number of Entries: 611
- Total Prize Pool: $611,000
- Number of Payouts: 54
- Winning Hand: K♠ Q♣

Final Table
Place	Name	Prize
1st	Luke Brabin (1/1)	$131,365
2nd	Didier Guerin	$81,220
3rd	Daniel Murphy	$59,334
4th	Stephen Lindeblad	$43,986
5th	Ryan Hong	$33,080
6th	Zane Ly	$25,234
7th	Brian McAllister	$19,521
8th	Piyush Gupta	$15,318
9th	David Profaca	$12,189

=== Event #2: $2,200 No Limit Hold'em ===
- 3-Day Event: October 4-6
- Number of Entries: 215
- Total Prize Pool: $430,000
- Number of Payouts: 24
- Winning Hand: 6♥ 6♠

Final Table
Place	Name	Prize
1st	Jay Loo (1/1)	$107,500
2nd	Aik-Chuan Nee	$66,400
3rd	Luke Spano	$48,358
4th	Martin Kozlov	$35,763
5th	Peco Stojanovski	$26,862
6th	Samuel Ngai	$20,490
7th	Sam Ruha	$15,867
8th	Feng Zhou	$12,470
9th	Michael O'Grady	$9,946

=== Event #3: $1,650 Pot Limit Omaha ===
- 3-Day Event: October 5-7
- Number of Entries: 123
- Total Prize Pool: $184,500
- Number of Payouts: 16
- Winning Hand: A♥ K♥ J♦ 5♠

Final Table
Place	Name	Prize
1st	Jeff Lisandro (1/6)	$51,660
2nd	Jason Gray	$31,931
3rd	Zane Ly	$22,771
4th	Gary Benson (0/1)	$16,563
5th	Paul Sharbanee	$12,282
6th	Paul Mac	$9,282
7th	Stephen Woodhead	$7,146
8th	Oliver Gill	$5,603

=== Event #4: $1,650 No Limit Hold'em Terminator ===
- 3-Day Event: October 6-8
- Number of Entries: 250
- Total Prize Pool: $375,000
- Number of Payouts: 31
- Winning Hand: 8♦ 6♦

Final Table
Place	Name	Prize
1st	Scott Calcagno (1/1)	$61,250
2nd	Nelson Maccini	$37,845
3rd	Andrew Dales	$27,343
4th	Duncan McKinnon	$20,123
5th	Nick Piskopos	$15,075
6th	Brandon Shack-Harris (1/1)	$11,488
7th	Henry Tran	$8,900
8th	Tony Hachem	$7,008
9th	Joe Cabret	$5,605

=== Event #5: $5,000 Pot Limit Omaha ===
- 3-Day Event: October 7-9
- Number of Entries: 80
- Total Prize Pool: $376,000
- Number of Payouts: 8
- Winning Hand: 4♣ 6♣ 8♦ 9♦

Final Table
Place	Name	Prize
1st	Sam Higgs (1/1)	$127,843
2nd	Mike Watson	$79,099
3rd	Jonathan Duhamel (0/2)	$52,068
4th	Jamie Pickering	$36,449
5th	Jeff Rossiter	$27,011
6th	Ismael Bojang	$21,123
7th	Kahle Burns	$17,386
8th	Richard Johnston	$15,021

=== Event #6: $1,650 Dealers Choice 8-Game ===
- 3-Day Event: October 8-10
- Number of Entries: 89
- Total Prize Pool: $133,500
- Number of Payouts: 9
- Winning Hand: Q♥ 10♠ 10♦ 4♥ (Pot Limit Omaha)

Final Table
Place	Name	Prize
1st	Rory Young (1/1)	$42,720
2nd	Sam Khouiss	$26,402
3rd	Brian Rast (0/2)	$18,482
4th	David Zhao	$13,462
5th	Jason Gray	$9,904
6th	George Danzer (2/2)	$7,399

=== Event #7: $2,200 No Limit Hold'em 6-Max ===
- 3-Day Event: October 9-11
- Number of Entries: 243
- Total Prize Pool: $486,000
- Number of Payouts: 27
- Winning Hand: K♥ 4♣

Final Table
Place	Name	Prize
1st	Alex Antonios (1/1)	$128,784
2nd	Michael Tran	$79,646
3rd	Steven Zhou	$55,365
4th	Phil Hellmuth* (0/14)	$38,909
5th	Yu Kurita	$27,624
6th	Bruno Politano	$19,809

=== Event #8: $5,000 Mixed Event 8-Game ===
- 3-Day Event: October 10-12
- Number of Entries: 48
- Total Prize Pool: $225,600
- Number of Payouts: 6
- Winning Hand: J♦ 10♠ (No Limit Hold'em)

Final Table
Place	Name	Prize
1st	George Danzer (3/3)	$84,600
2nd	Scott Clements (0/2)	$52,340
3rd	Jonathan Duhamel (0/1)	$34,291
4th	Ismael Bojang	$23,688
5th	Tino Lechich	$17,371
6th	Sam Khouiss	$13,310

=== Event #9: $10,000 No Limit Hold'em Main Event ===
- 6-Day Event: October 12-18
- Number of Entries: 329
- Total Prize Pool: $3,125,500
- Number of Payouts: 36
- Winning Hand: 6♦ 6♠

Final Table
Place	Name	Prize
1st	Scott Davies (1/1)	$850,136
2nd	Jack Salter	$516,960
3rd	Henry Wang	$343,805
4th	Kyle Montgomery	$231,287
5th	Frank Kassela (0/2)	$164,089
6th	Ang Italiano	$118,769

=== Event #10: $25,000 High Roller No Limit Hold'em ===
- 3-Day Event: October 15-17
- Number of Entries: 68
- Total Prize Pool: $1,632,000
- Number of Payouts: 8
- Winning Hand: K♠ 7♦

Final Table
Place	Name	Prize
1st	Mike Leah (1/1)	$600,000
2nd	David Yan	$360,025
3rd	Jesse Sylvia	$216,811
4th	Jonathan Duhamel (0/1)	$145,003
5th	Sam Khouiss	$110,078
6th	Brian Roberts	$85,027
