= George Danzer =

German poker player (born 1983)

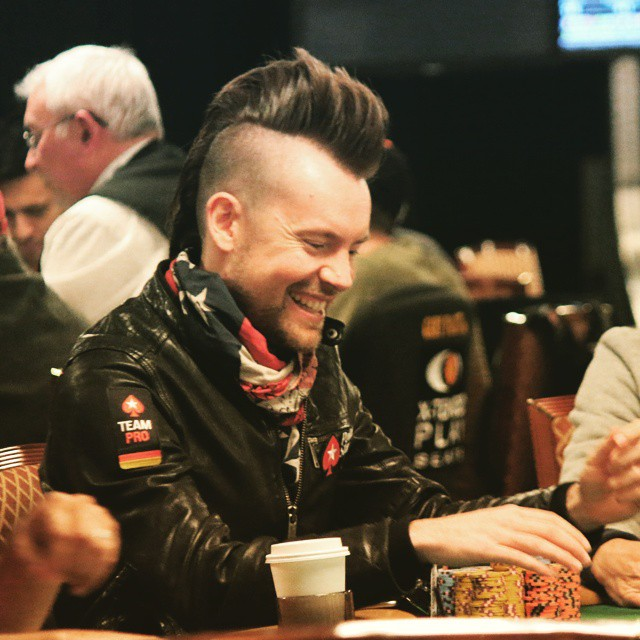
- George Danzer at the WSOP
- Nickname: Tricky Scarfy
- Born: 17 July 1983 (age 43); São Paulo, Brazil

World Series of Poker
- Bracelets: 4
- Final tables: 10
- Money finishes: 17
- Highest WSOP Main Event finish: 305th, 2006

European Poker Tour
- Title: None
- Final table: None
- Money finishes: 6

George Danzer (born 17 July 1983 in São Paulo, Brazil) is a German-Brazilian entrepreneur and former professional poker player, based in Salzburg, Austria who is a four-time World Series of Poker bracelets winner, winning the inaugural $10,000 Seven Card Razz Championship and then the $10,000 Seven-Card Stud High-Low Championship at the 2014 World Series of Poker. He won his third bracelet winning the $5,000 Mixed Event 8-Game event at the 2014 World Series of Poker Asia Pacific. His total live tournament winnings exceed $1.9 million

In his youth he excelled at Chess and played the World Youth Championship for Portugal as the sub 10 Portuguese Champion.

In May 2006, he finished 3rd at the Worlds Heads Up Championship in Barcelona.

== World Series of Poker ==
At the 2006 World Series of Poker Main Event, he became known as the player who is seen receiving a series of bad beats at the Main Event, which resulted in increasing the stack of the then chip leader Dmitri Nobles. During the ESPN broadcast Danzer is seen leaving the table to steam off, only to return and congratulate his opponent.

He made the final table at the 2007 World Series of Poker in the $1,500 Pot-Limit Omaha Hi-Low Split-8 or Better event outlasting 678 players in his ninth-place finish.

At the 2010 World Series of Poker, Danzer finished 3rd in the $10,000 2–7 Draw Lowball Championship in a field of 101 players for $115,295 behind runner-up Eric Cloutier and the winner David "Bakes" Baker.

At the 2012 World Series of Poker, he finished 2nd in the $2,500 Omaha/Seven Card Stud Hi-Low 8 or Better event $140,825 behind the winner Oleksii Kovalchuk and then finished 3rd in the $10,000 No-Limit 2–7 Single Draw event for $115,295 behind runner-up Mike Wattel and winner Nick Schulman.

At the 2013 World Series of Poker, he made the final table the $2,500 Omaha/Seven Card Stud Hi-Low 8-or Better event finishing in 6th place for $34,348.

At the 2014 World Series of Poker, Danzer won his first bracelet by winning the $10,000 Seven Card Razz event for $294,792. He later won his second bracelet by winning the $10,000 Seven-Card Stud High-Low Championship event, earning $352,696. He won his third bracelet by winning the AU$5,000 8-Game Mixed event at the 2014 World Series of Poker Asia Pacific, earning AU$84,600.

His performance at the 2014 World Series of Poker (which included events at the 2014 World Series of Poker Asia Pacific) secured him the 2014 WSOP Player of the Year Award.

He won his 4th WSOP bracelet is 2016 in the $10,000 Seven Card Stud Hi-Lo Split-8 or Better Championship for $338,646.

As of 2023, his total live tournament winnings exceed $2,700,000.

=== World Series of Poker bracelets ===
| Year | Event | Prize Money |
|---|---|---|
| 2014 | $10,000 Seven Card Razz | $294,792 |
| 2014 | $10,000 Seven Card Stud Hi-Lo Split-8 or Better | $352,696 |
| 2014A | $5,000 Mixed Event 8-Game | $84,600 |
| 2016 | $10,000 Seven Card Stud Hi-Lo Split-8 or Better | $338,646 |

An "A" following a year denotes bracelet(s) won at the World Series of Poker Asia-Pacific

== Online poker ==
As a member of Team PokerStars Pro, Danzer plays under his own name "GeorgeDanzer" among his highlights online are two World Championship of Online Poker (WCOOP) titles, the first in the 2009 WCOOP $320 Pot Limit Omaha [1 Rebuy/1 Add-on, 6-max] event for $109,545 and his second in the 2012 WCOOP $320 No Limit Hold’em [Ante Up] event for $69,717.09 and four Spring Championship of Online Poker (SCOOP) titles his first was in 2010 winning the $162 Fixed-Limit Badugi (Medium) event for $10,345.70, in the 2012 SCOOP he won his 2nd and 3rd title, the $2,100 NL Single Draw 2–7 (High) event for $34,040 and then the $2,100 NL Hold'em [4-Max] (High) event for $155,000 then winning his fourth SCOOP title in the $2,100 PL Omaha [Turbo, Zoom] (High) event for $129,645.

== Career ==
=== inSight (2018) ===
Since mid-2018, Danzer is the CEO of the agency inSight gg GmbH, which specializes in individual influencer marketing on the Twitch and Youtube platforms.

=== Youblicity (2019) ===
Since March 2019, Danzer has been managing director of Youblicity GmbH, a technology provider for advertising in live streams.
