= 2013 World Series of Poker Asia Pacific =

Series of poker tournaments

Below are the results for the 2013 (and inaugural) World Series of Poker Asia Pacific tournaments.

== Key ==
*	Elected to the Poker Hall of Fame
(#/#)	This denotes a bracelet winner. The first number is the number of bracelets won in the 2013 WSOP APAC. The second number is the total number of bracelets won. Both numbers represent totals as of that point during the tournament.
Place	What place each player at the final table finished
Name	The player who made it to the final table
Prize (AUS$)	The amount of money awarded for each finish at the event's final table

== Results ==
#	Event	Entrants	Winner	Prize	Runner-up	Results
1	$1,100 No Limit Hold'em Accumulator	1,085	Bryan Piccioli (1/1)	$211,575	Jonathan Karamalikis	Results
2	$1,650 Pot Limit Omaha	172	Jim Collopy (1/1)	$69,662	Edison Nguyen	Results
3	$2,200 Mixed Event	81	Phil Ivey (1/9)	$51,840	Brandon Wong	Results
4	$5,000 No Limit Hold'em Six Handed	167	Aaron Lim (1/1)	$233,800	Andy Lee	Results
5	$10,000 No Limit Hold'em Main Event	405	Daniel Negreanu (1/5)	$1,038,825	Daniel Marton	Results

=== Event #1: $1,100 No Limit Hold'em Accumulator ===
- 5-Day Event: April 4–8
- Number of Entries: 1,085
- Total Prize Pool: $1,085,000
- Number of Payouts: 90
- Winning Hand: A♣ 8♦

Final Table
Place	Name	Prize
1st	Bryan Piccioli (1/1)	$211,575
2nd	Jonathan Karamalikis	$130,743
3rd	Jay Loo	$96,305
4th	Jonathan Duhamel (0/1)	$71,870
5th	Jeremy Ausmus	$54,337
6th	Graeme Putt	$41,610
7th	Iori Yogo	$32,268
8th	Peter Kleugden	$25,335
9th	Ryan Otto	$20,138

=== Event #2: $1,650 Pot Limit Omaha ===
- 3-Day Event: April 7–9
- Number of Entries: 172
- Total Prize Pool: $258,000
- Number of Payouts: 18
- Winning Hand: A♦ 10♠ 9♣ 4♦

Final Table
Place	Name	Prize
1st	Jim Collopy (1/1)	$69,662
2nd	Edison Nguyen	$43,050
3rd	Tino Lechich	$30,988
4th	Scott Reid	$22,712
5th	Dan Shak	$16,940
6th	Paul Sharbanee	$12,856
7th	Mike Leah	$9,923
8th	Martin Kozlov	$7,784
9th	Marvin Rettenmaier	$6,207

=== Event #3: $2,200 Mixed Event ===
- 3-Day Event: April 8–10
- Number of Entries: 81
- Total Prize Pool: $162,000
- Number of Payouts: 9
- Winning Hand: 10-9-8-3-2 (2–7 Triple Draw)

Final Table
Place	Name	Prize
1st	Phil Ivey (1/9)	$51,840
2nd	Brandon Wong	$32,039
3rd	Graeme Putt	$22,427
4th	Daniel Negreanu (0/4)	$16,336
5th	Robert Campbell	$12,020
6th	Kevin Song (0/1)	$8,978

=== Event #4: $5,000 No Limit Hold'em Six Handed ===
- 3-Day Event: April 9-11
- Number of Entries: 167
- Total Prize Pool: $835,000
- Number of Payouts: 18
- Winning Hand: K♥ 5♥

Final Table
Place	Name	Prize
1st	Aaron Lim (1/1)	$233,800
2nd	Andy Lee	$144,530
3rd	Jan Suchanek	$103,766
4th	Brendon Rubie	$74,590
5th	Sam Higgs	$53,615
6th	Billy Seri	$38,545

=== Event #5: $10,000 No Limit Hold'em Main Event ===
- 5-Day Event: April 11–15
- Number of Entries: 405
- Total Prize Pool: $3,847,500
- Number of Payouts: 40
- Winning Hand: 2♠ 2♥

Final Table
Place	Name	Prize
1st	Daniel Negreanu (1/5)	$1,038,825
2nd	Daniel Marton	$637,911
3rd	Winfred Yu	$423,225
4th	George Tsatsis	$284,715
5th	Kahle Burns	$201,994
6th	Benny Spindler	$146,205
7th	Mikel Habb	$107,730
8th	Russell Thomas	$82,721
