= J. P. Kelly =

English poker player

J.P. Kelly
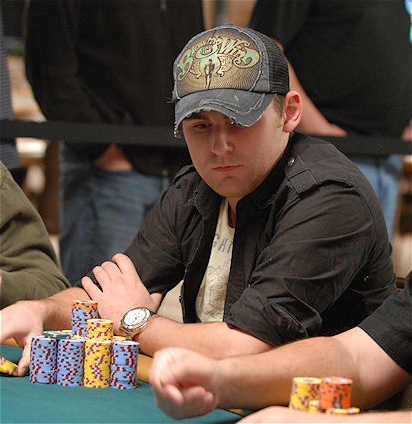
- Kelly playing in the $1,500 Pot-Limit Hold'Em at the 2009 WSOP

World Series of Poker
- Bracelets: 2
- Final tables: 3
- Money finishes: 9
- Highest WSOP Main Event finish: 26th, 2011

European Poker Tour
- Title: None
- Final table: None
- Money finishes: 2

John-Paul Kelly, known as J.P. Kelly, is a professional poker player from Aylesbury, England. Kelly is a two time World Series of Poker bracelet winner, having won the 2009 World Series of Poker $1,500 Pot Limit Hold'em event in Las Vegas and then later that same year won another bracelet at the 2009 World Series of Poker Europe in the £1,000 No Limit Hold'em event in London. He was a member of team PokerStars Pro, playing under the screen name "jp Kelly" However, his association with PokerStars has since ended.

As of July 2017, his total live tournament winnings exceed $2,800,000.

== World Series of Poker bracelets ==
| Year | Event | Prize Money |
|---|---|---|
| 2009 | $1,500 Pot Limit Hold'em | $194,434 |
| 2009E | £1,000 No Limit Hold'em | £136,803 ($225,535) |

An "E" following a year denotes bracelet(s) won at the World Series of Poker Europe
