= Julien Martini =

French poker player

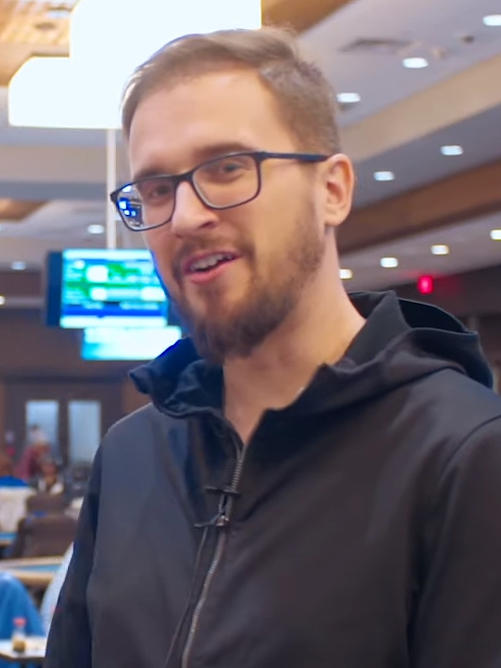
Julien Martini at the WPT Gardens Poker Championship, 2020

Julien Martini is a French poker player.

== Poker career ==
Martini is a four-time bracelet winner at the WSOP. He won his first bracelet in a $1,500 Omaha Hi-Lo 8 or Better event in 2018. His second and third bracelets came in the 2021 WSOP Europe in a No Limit Short Deck Hold'em event and an 8-Game Mix Event. In the 2022 WSOP, he added one bracelet in the $10,000 Razz Championship event.

As of 2024, Martini's total live poker tournament winnings exceed $5,800,000.
