= World Series of Poker Asia Pacific =

Series of poker tournaments

The World Series of Poker Asia Pacific (WSOP APAC) is the third expansion of the World Series of Poker-branded poker tournaments outside the United States. Since 1970 participants have had to travel to Las Vegas, Nevada to compete in the World Series of Poker (WSOP). Although the WSOP started holding circuit events in 2005 in other states, the main tournaments, which awarded bracelets to the winners, were exclusively held in Las Vegas. In 2007 the inaugural World Series of Poker Europe marked the first time that a WSOP bracelet was awarded outside Las Vegas. The WSOP further expanded to Africa in 2010 and 2012 however these events did not award any bracelets.

The WSOP Europe and WSOP Asia Pacific rotate annually, with WSOP APAC being held in even-numbered years and WSOPE in odd-numbered years. Therefore, the WSOP Asia Pacific was held in 2014 while the next WSOP Europe event was in 2015.

== Highlights ==
=== 2013 World Series of Poker Asia Pacific ===
The inaugural World Series of Poker Asia Pacific took place April 4–15, 2013 at Crown Casino in Melbourne, Australia and featured five bracelet events. In addition, there was a high roller event and a Caesars Cup tournament which did not award a bracelet.

The Main Event, High Roller and Caesars Cup events were televised on ESPN Australia, with commentary by Lon McEachern and Norman Chad, along with sideline reporter Lynn Gilmartin.

=== 2014 World Series of Poker Asia Pacific ===
The 2014 World Series of Poker Asia Pacific was held from October 2–18 at Crown Casino in Melbourne, Australia. There were 10 bracelet events, culminating in a $10,000 Main Event and a $25,000 High Roller. This was the second edition of WSOP APAC, and the first under a new schedule which will see this event and WSOP Europe held in alternate years.

== Main Event winners ==
Year	Winner	Winning hand	Prize	Entrants	Runner-up	Losing hand
2013	(Canada) Daniel Negreanu	2♠ 2♥	A$1,038,825	405	(Australia) Daniel Marton	A♠ 7♠
2014	(United States) Scott Davies	6♦ 6♠	A$850,136	329	(United Kingdom) Jack Salter	Q♣ 10♣
