= Asi Moshe =

Israeli poker player

Asi Moshe (Hebrew: אסי משה) is an Israeli poker player.

== Poker career ==
Moshe is a five-time bracelet winner at the WSOP. He won his first bracelet in a $1,500 No Limit Hold'em tournament in 2014. His second bracelet came at the 2018 WSOP Europe in a €1,515 + 135 No Limit Hold'em - 6-Max Deepstack event. He won his third bracelet at the 2019 WSOP in a $1,500 No Limit Hold'em Bounty event. He won his fourth bracelet at the 2019 WSOP Europe in €1,650 Pot Limit Omaha/No Limit Hold'em Mix event.

As of 2026, Moshe's total live poker tournament winnings exceed $3,468,88.
