= Bryan Piccioli =

American poker player (born 1989)

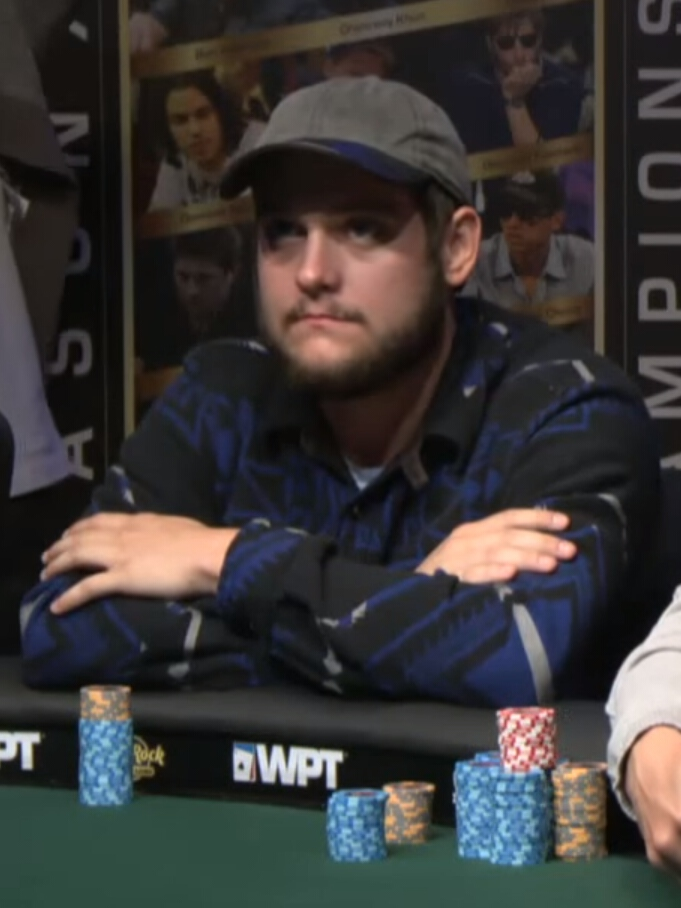
- Piccioli at the WPT Seminole Hard Rock Poker Finale in April 2016
- Nickname: theczar19
- Born: April 11, 1989 (age 37); Allegany, New York, U.S.

World Series of Poker
- Bracelets: 2
- Final tables: 4
- Money finishes: 64
- Highest WSOP Main Event finish: 6th, 2017

World Poker Tour
- Title: None
- Final tables: 2
- Money finishes: 13

European Poker Tour
- Money finishes: 4

Bryan Piccioli (born April 11, 1989) is an American professional poker player from Allegany, New York. A two-time World Series of Poker bracelet winner, he made the final table of the WSOP Main Event in 2017.

Piccioli attended the University at Buffalo but left after his sophomore year when he won two online satellites into European Poker Tour events and earned nearly $40,000. Playing as "theczar19," he has earned more than $4.4 million on PokerStars and was the top-ranked online poker player on PocketFives in May 2011.

Piccioli first made a WSOP final table in 2012, when he finished in seventh place in a $1,500 No Limit Hold'em event. His first bracelet came at the 2013 WSOP Asia-Pacific in Melbourne, Australia, prevailing over a field of 1,085 and winning the $1,100 No Limit Hold'em Accumulator event for $211,575. He added a second bracelet in a $500 No Limit Hold'em turbo event at the 2021 WSOP Online.

In 2016, Piccioli was chip leader after Day 4 of the WSOP Main Event before finishing in 84th place. The next year, he made the final table and finished in sixth place, earning $1,675,000.

Piccioli has also made two final tables on the World Poker Tour, finishing in third place in the Bay 101 Shooting Star in March 2016 and sixth place in the Seminole Hard Rock Poker Finale a month later.

As of July 2021, Piccioli's live tournament winnings exceed $4.5 million.

== World Series of Poker bracelets ==
Year	Tournament	Prize (US$)
2013 A	$1,100 No Limit Hold'em Accumulator	$211,575
2021 O	$500 No Limit Hold'em Turbo Deepstack	$83,332

An "A" following a year denotes bracelet(s) won at the World Series of Poker Asia-Pacific
An "O" following a year denotes bracelet(s) won at the World Series of Poker Online
