= Praz Bansi =

British poker player

Pramesh Bansi
- Nickname: Praz

World Series of Poker
- Bracelets: 2
- Money finishes: 11
- Highest WSOP Main Event finish: 240th, 2010

World Poker Tour
- Title: None
- Final table: None
- Money finishes: 2

Pramesh 'Praz' Bansi is a British professional poker player from London, England, who has won two bracelets at the World Series of Poker and is part of the London-based poker group The Hitsquad.

Prior to his career as a professional poker player, Praz Bansi spent five years working as a recruiting consultant but decided to quit and focus full-time on poker when he found that he had a talent for it. In an interview with Poker Player Magazine, Bansi stated that he downloaded poker software onto his work computer and spent most of his time playing online before building up his bankroll and heading to Las Vegas.

== World Series of Poker ==
In 2006, Bansi won his first World Series of Poker Bracelet in a $1,000 No Limit Hold'em event, earning £230,209, having already cashed in a previous event the same year.

In 2009, Bansi came third in the £10,000 World Series of Poker Europe Main event, earning £360,887 ($594,963) for his efforts.

In 2010, Bansi won his second bracelet in a $1,500 No Limit Hold'em event, earning $515,501.

=== World Series of Poker Bracelets ===
Year	Tournament	Prize (US$)
2006	$1,000 No Limit Hold'em	$230,209
2010	$1,500 No Limit Hold'em	$515,501

== Other events ==
In January 2007, Bansi won the Grosvenor UK Poker Tour £1,000 GPT Leg 1 - No Limit Hold'em for a prize of £75,000. The following month he won the £1,000 No Limit Hold'em - Main Event as part of the Poker Festival in Birmingham for a prize of £32,550.

In 2008, Bansi won the $2,500 Super Satellite Sixth Annual Five Star World Poker Classic as part of the WPT World Championship in Las Vegas, and just two days later won the $2,500 Super Satellite II with each win earning him $25,700.

Praz Bansi was featured on the cover of the May 2009 Inside Poker magazine and is one of the rising stars of the UK poker scene.

Bansi was also named Poker Player Magazine's UK player of the year in 2009.

Bansi was a member of the Gutshot Poker Club based in London, England.

In 2009, had the most successful year of his career to date, winning the $5,000 No Limit Hold'em Seventh Annual Five Star World Poker Classic in Las Vegas for a prize of $133,380. Just three days later at the same tournament, he earned an additional $25,700 for winning the $2,500 Super Satellite. Later in 2009, Bansi won the biggest prize of his career, placing 3rd out of a field of 334 entrants in the £10,000 No Limit Hold'em - World Championship Event in the 2009 World Series of Poker Europe for a prize of £360,887 ($594,963 US). In an interview with ESPN, Bansi said that this was the toughest tournament in the world.

In 2010, Bansi won the $530 Supersatellite Main Event in the PokerStars Caribbean Adventure at Paradise Island for a $10,000 prize. Bansi also finished 18th out of 1529 entrants at the Paradise Island $10,000 No Limit Hold'em Main Event to win a $87,500 prize

As of 2010, Bansi's live tournament winnings exceed $2,300,000, of which $1,417,300 have come from the WSOP.
