= 2021 World Series of Poker Online =

Series of online poker tournaments

- Location: Online (WSOP.com and GGPoker)
- Dates: July 1-September 12

Champion
- (Russia) Aleksei Vandyshev

The 2021 World Series of Poker Online was the second annual series of online poker tournaments organized by the World Series of Poker (WSOP).

There were WSOP bracelet events held across two online sites, WSOP.com and GGPoker. The WSOP.com schedule began on July 1 for players located in New Jersey and Nevada and featured 33 events.

In July, to mark the opening of WSOP.com to players in Pennsylvania, the WSOP announced an additional series of eight bracelet events that will run from August 8-15.

The GGPoker portion of the schedule, for players outside the United States, ran from August 1-September 12. There were also 33 bracelet events, culminating in the $5,000 Main Event with a $20 million guaranteed prize pool.

The live portion of the WSOP began at the Rio All-Suite Hotel and Casino on September 30.

== WSOP.com Schedule ==
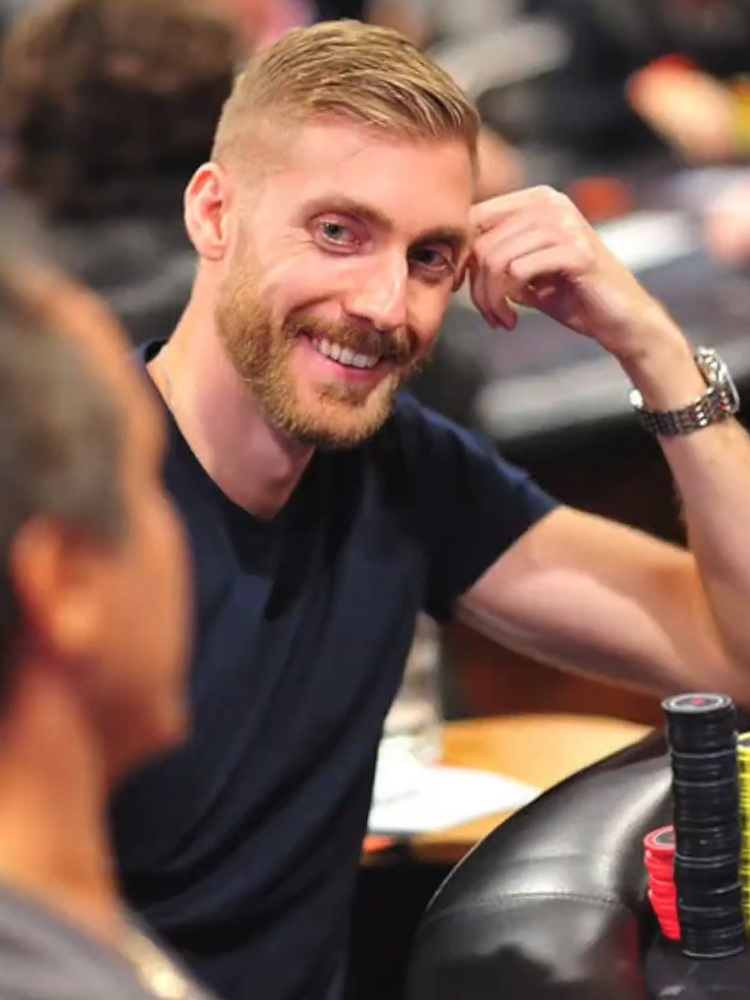
Manig Löser won his first bracelet in Event #2

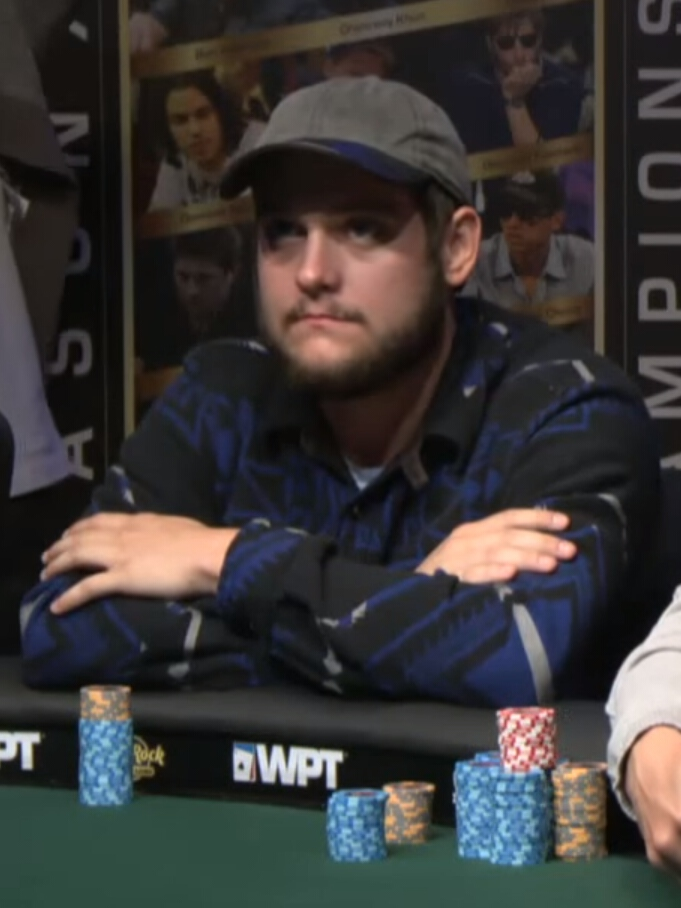
Bryan Piccioli won his second bracelet in Event #12

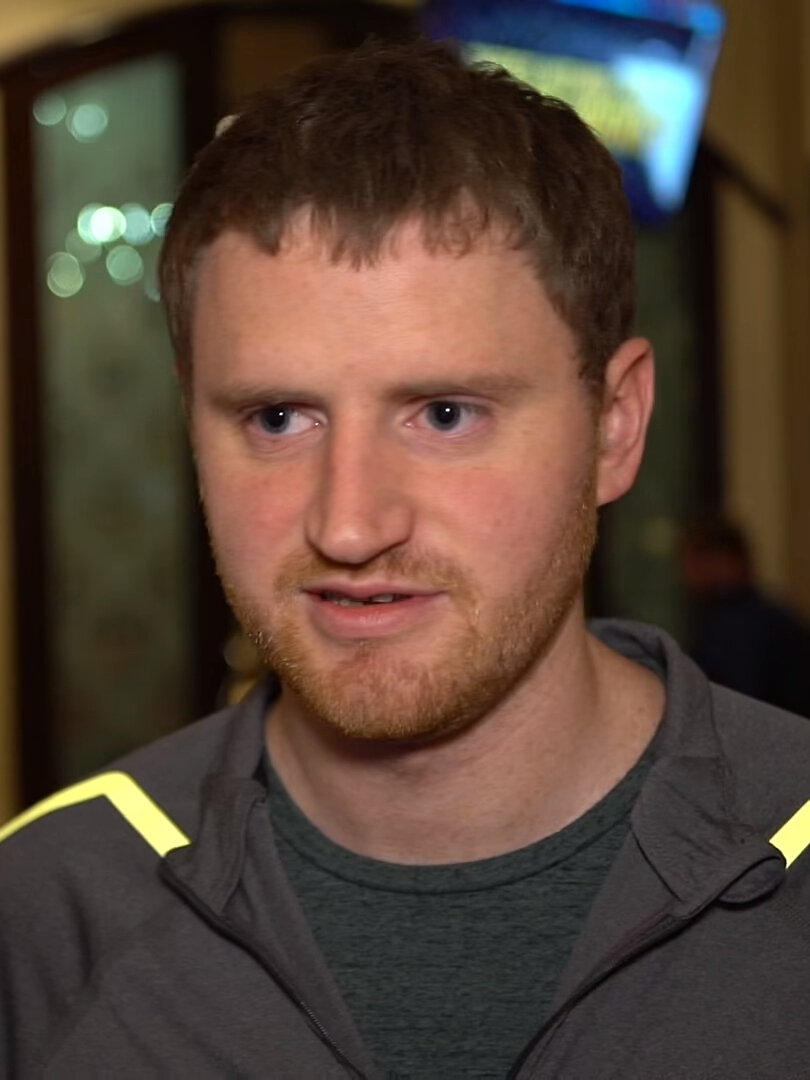
David Peters won his third bracelet in Event #25

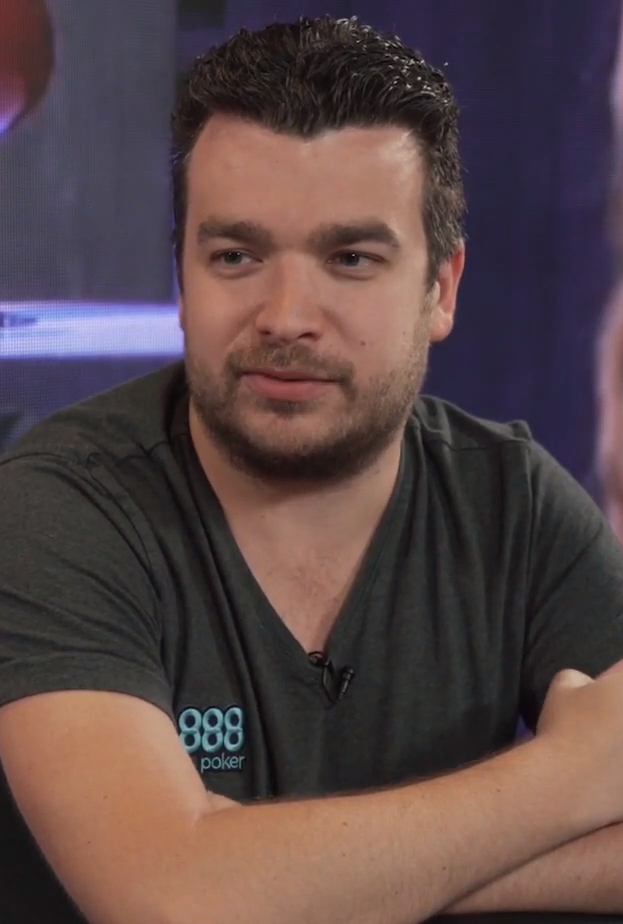
Chris Moorman won his second bracelet in Event #29

Key: (bracelet number for 2021/bracelet number for career)

=== Nevada and New Jersey ===
#	Event	Entrants	Winner	Prize	Runner-up
1	$500 No Limit Hold'em The Big 500 Kick-Off	1,277	(United States) Jose Noboa (1/1)	$105,161	(United States) Christopher Basile
2	$600 No Limit Hold'em Monsterstack	1,038	(Germany) Manig Löser (1/1)	$104,313	(United States) Mark Liedtke
3	$500 No Limit Hold'em Turbo Deepstack	950	(United States) Donnell Dais (1/1)	$90,801	(United States) Mike Azzaro
4	$500 No Limit Hold'em Super Turbo	850	(United States) Jeffery Hoop (1/1)	$73,861	(United States) Ryan Hohner
5	$1,000 No Limit Hold'em 8-Max	459	(United States) Jeremiah Williams (1/1)	$139,600	(United States) Chung You
6	$2,000 No Limit Hold'em Deepstack	416	(United States) Tyler Denson (1/1)	$175,700	(United States) Steven Kelly (0/1)
7	$777 No Limit Hold'em Lucky 7s	888	(United States) Michael Mercaldo (1/1)	$123,574	(United States) James Anderson (0/1)
8	$888 No Limit Hold'em Crazy Eights	782	(United States) Carlos Welch (1/1)	$124,369	(United States) Joon Kim (0/1)
9	$400 No Limit Hold'em 6-Max	1,217	(United States) Philip Beck (1/1)	$81,534	(United States) Justin Wong
10	$333 No Limit Hold'em	1,517	(United States) Michael Leib (1/1)	$81,645	(United States) Robert Aronowitz
11	$400 No Limit Hold'em Ultra Deepstack	1,417	(United States) Vijay Para (1/1)	$86,210	(Belgium) Felix Vandeput
12	$500 No Limit Hold'em Turbo Deepstack	959	(United States) Bryan Piccioli (1/2)	$83,332	(United States) Dan Sindelar
13	$1,000 No Limit Hold'em Freezeout	561	(United States) Ryan Leng (1/2)	$108,654	(United States) Carmine Ciccone
14	$500 No Limit Hold'em	1,036	(United States) Gionni Demers (1/1)	$90,023	(United States) David Williams (0/1)
15	$5,300 No Limit Hold'em High Roller Freezeout	188	(United States) Justin Saliba (1/1)	$253,800	(United States) Jonathan Dokler (0/1)
16	$600 Pot Limit Omaha Hi-Lo 6-Handed	498	(United States) Allen Chang (1/2)	$61,394	(United States) Edwin Roman
17	$400 No Limit Hold'em 8-Max	1,125	(United States) Justin Lapka (1/1)	$75,371	(United States) Uke Dauti
18	$1,000 No Limit Hold'em North American Open	756	(United States) James Gilbert (1/1)	$137,570	(United States) Landon Tice
19	$888 Pot Limit Omaha Crazy Eights	507	(United States) Martin Zamani (1/1)	$92,598	(United States) Shawn Stroke
20	$3,200 No Limit Hold'em High Roller	312	(United States) Sang Lee (1/1)	$241,768	(United States) Daniel Buzgon
21	$600 Pot Limit Omaha 6-Handed	551	(United States) Bradley Ruben (1/2)	$69,148	(United States) Michael Holtz
22	$600 No Limit Hold'em Knockout	612	(United Kingdom) Anthony Kennedy (1/1)	$46,796	(United States) Ryan Basile
23	$500 No Limit Hold'em Turbo	694	(United States) Ryan Hagerty (1/1)	$67,207	(United States) Richard Liotta
24	$400 No Limit Hold'em Monsterstack	1,176	(United States) Byung Yoo (1/1)	$77,475	(United States) Corey Paggeot
25	$7,777 No Limit Hold'em Lucky 7s High Roller	151	(United States) David Peters (1/3)	$283,940	(United States) Charles Hook
26	$500 No Limit Hold'em The Big 500 Encore	1,118	(United States) Eric Van Auken (1/1)	$93,627	(United States) Dominick Sarle
27	$1,000 Pot Limit Omaha Championship	398	(United States) David Goldberg (1/1)	$86,440	(United States) Todd Sladek
28	$3,200 No Limit Hold'em High Roller Championship	265	(United States) Daniel Lazrus (1/1)	$205,347	(United States) Daniel Buzgon
29	$800 No Limit Hold'em 8-Max Turbo Deepstack Championship	623	(United Kingdom) Chris Moorman (1/2)	$102,406	(United Kingdom) Matthew Hunt
30	$600 No Limit Hold'em 6-Max Championship	783	(United States) Mitchell Halverson (1/1)	$84,057	(United States) Joshua Faris
31	$500 No Limit Hold'em Summer Saver	917	(United States) Brad Zusman (1/1)	$79,683	(United States) Mark Ioli
32	$1,000 No Limit Hold'em Championship	821	(United States) Drew O'Connell (1/1)	$146,893	(United States) Jason Rivkin
33	$500 No Limit Hold'em Grand Finale	2,024	(United States) Dan Sindelar (1/1)	$159,100	(United States) Stanley Lee

=== Pennsylvania ===
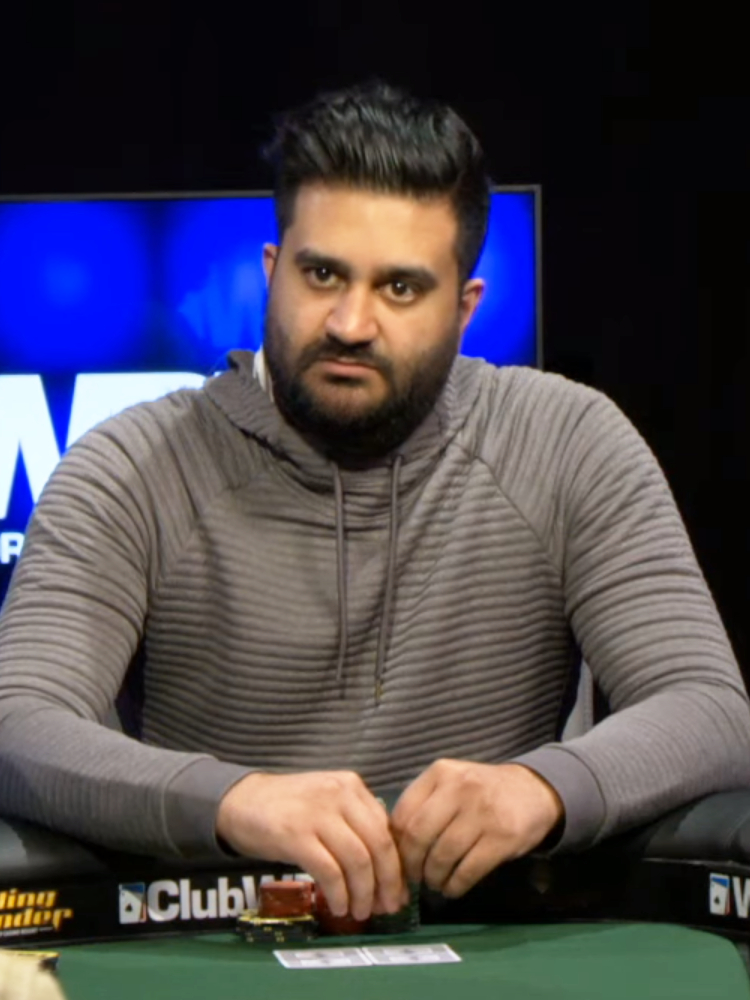
Shankar Pillai won his third bracelet in Event #3

#	Event	Entrants	Winner	Prize	Runner-up
1	$500 No Limit Hold'em Keystone Kick Off	500	(United States) Mark Herm (1/1)	$48,420	(United States) Meredith Minger
2	$500 No Limit Hold'em PKO	327	(United States) T.J. Carney (1/1)	$27,593	(United States) Frederick Ferrell
3	$3,200 No Limit Hold'em High Roller	86	(United States) Shankar Pillai (1/3)	$66,641	(United States) Brandon Hall
4	$400 No Limit Hold'em 6-Max	421	(United States) Dean Morrow (1/1)	$35,480	(United States) Michael McNeil
5	$777 No Limit Hold'em Lucky 7s	226	(United States) Nicholas Lein (1/1)	$40,325	(United States) Ben Gazzola
6	$400 No Limit Hold'em PKO	319	(United States) Thong Do (1/1)	$22,214	(United States) Shawn Stroke
7	$600 No Limit Hold'em Monster Stack	288	(United States) Michael Lavin (1/1)	$39,642	(United States) Matthew Boulden
8	$1,000 No Limit Hold'em PA Championship	311	(United States) Andrew Porter (1/1)	$65,525	(United States) Mukul Pahuja

== GGPoker Schedule ==
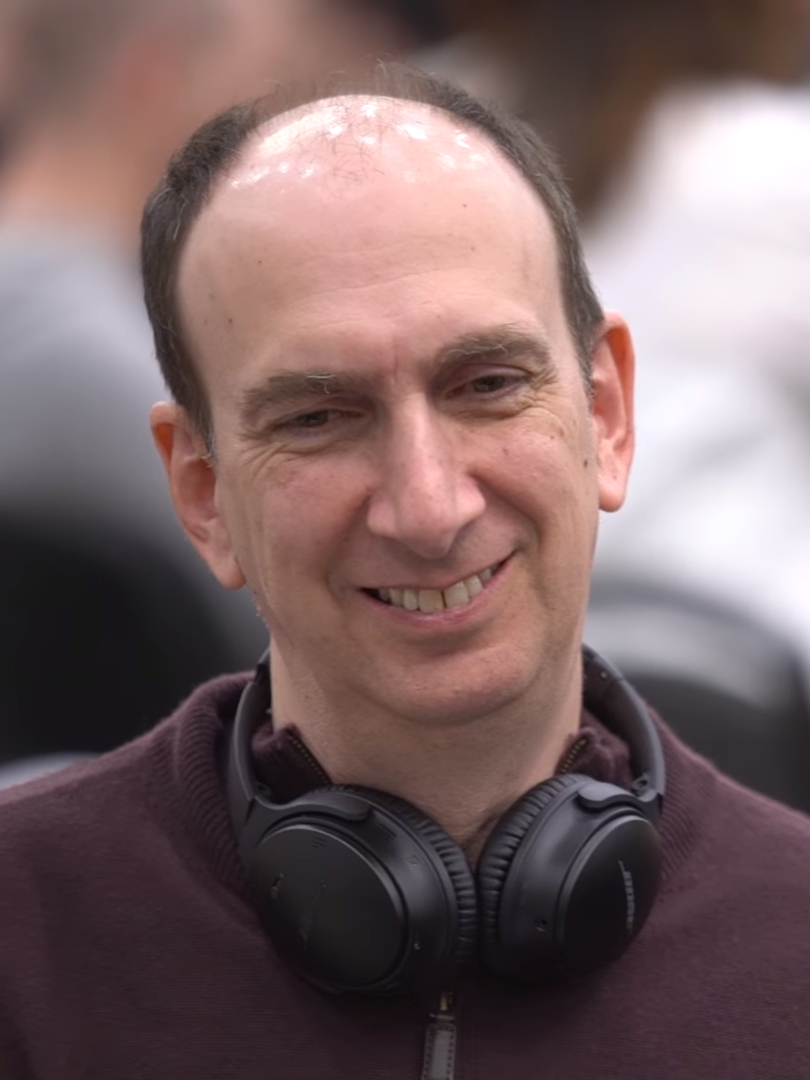
Hall of Famer Erik Seidel won Event #11 for his ninth bracelet

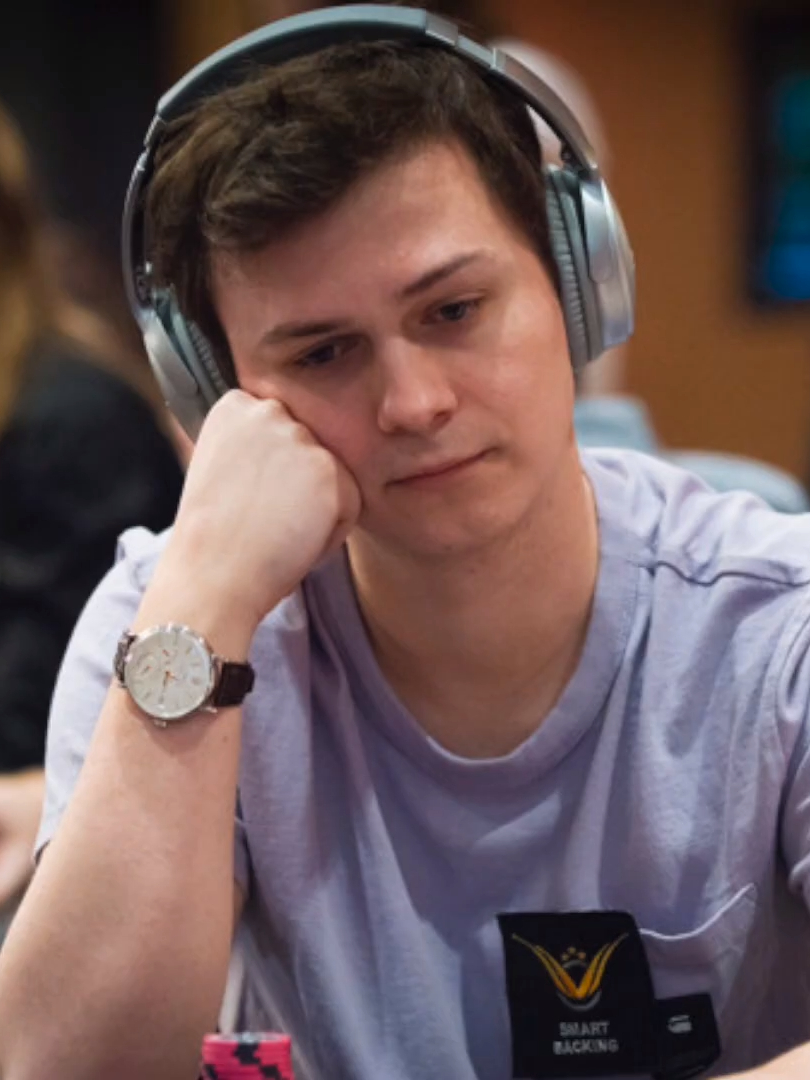
Former PCA champ Dominik Panka won his first bracelet in Event #28

Key: (bracelet number for 2021/bracelet number for career)

#	Event	Entrants	Winner	Prize	Runner-up
1	$50 The Return No Limit Hold'em	30,810	(Poland) Bartłomiej Świeboda (1/1)	$161,111	(Vietnam) Cuong Trinh
2	$1,111 Caesars Cares Charity Event	1,584	(Brazil) João Simão (1/1)	$206,075	(Norway) Espen Sandvik (0/1)
3	$2,500 Limit Hold'em Championship	180	(Italy) Nicolò Molinelli (1/2)	$88,461	(Brazil) Renan Bruschi
4	$800 Double Chance No Limit Hold'em	1,643	(Brazil) Thiago Macedo (1/1)	$161,637	(Finland) Andreas Nasman
5	$315 Bounty Deepstack No Limit Hold'em	2,989	(Poland) Kacper Pyzara (1/1)	$79,785	(Russia) Evgeny Kochubey
6	$200 Flip & Go No Limit Hold'em	6,368	(Greece) Georgios Sotiropoulos (1/2)	$117,022	(Taiwan) Yen-Liang Yao
7	$1,500 Millionaire Maker No Limit Hold'em	5,437	(Brazil) Eduardo Pires (1/1)	$1,384,013	(Austria) Lukas Hafner
8	$5,000 No Limit Hold'em 6-Handed Championship	479	(Germany) Daniel Smiljkovic (1/1)	$423,426	(China) Xuming Qi
9	$525 Superstack Turbo Bounty No Limit Hold'em	2,229	(Brazil) Lucio Lima (1/1)	$91,205	(Hong Kong) Anson Tsang (0/2)
10	$400 Double Chance Pot Limit Omaha	975	(Hungary) Roland Czika (1/1)	$55,369	(Singapore) Lei Yang
11	$10,000 Super Million$ High Roller	624	(United States) Erik Seidel (1/9)	$977,842	(Uruguay) Francisco Benítez
12	$1,000 Double Stack No Limit Hold'em	5,894	(Hong Kong) Hinojas Jerome (1/1)	$635,576	(Brazil) Felipe Ramos
13	$5,000 Pot Limit Omaha Championship	267	(Lithuania) Vincas Tamasauskas (1/1)	$268,926	(Hungary) Ben Lakatos
14	$500 The Big 500	2,639	(Brazil) Renan Bruschi (1/1)	$150,327	(Russia) Alex Bilokur (0/1)
15	$10,000 Heads-Up No Limit Hold'em Championship	161	(France) Arthur Conan (1/1)	$466,167	(Latvia) Aleksejs Ponakovs
16	$1,050 WSOP GGMasters High Roller	2,240	(Finland) Samuel Vousden (1/1)	$274,519	(China) Qibing Wang
17	$400 Plossus	4,576	(Israel) Gabi Livshitz (1/1)	$152,165	(Russia) Yuri Suvorov
18	$5,000 Short Deck Championship	144	(Russia) Radmir Sadirov (1/1)	$169,111	(Portugal) João Vieira (0/1)
19	$840 6-Handed Bounty No Limit Hold'em	2,053	(Ukraine) Andrii Derzhypilskyi (1/1)	$154,322	(Brazil) Luciano Hollanda
20	$1,500 Monster Stack No Limit Hold'em	1,080	(Brazil) Eduardo Rodrigues (1/1)	$212,815	(Italy) Dario Sammartino
21	$25,000 Super High Roller Championship	255	(Greece) Alexandros Theologis (1/1)	$1,212,033	(Australia) Kahle Burns (0/2)
22	$400 Colossus	10,903	(Italy) Armando D'Avanzo (1/1)	$409,007	(Japan) Kosuke Tajima
23	$600 Deepstack Championship No Limit Hold'em	2,820	(Portugal) Nuno Capucho (1/1)	$190,274	(United Kingdom) Karolina Norvaisaite
24	$1,050 Bounty Pot Limit Omaha	896	(Russia) Dmitry Yurasov (1/2)	$92,711	(Canada) Ami Barer
25	$777 Lucky Sevens No Limit Hold'em	2,014	(United States) David Jackson (1/1)	$194,178	(Romania) Dumitru Pora
26	$888 Crazy Eights No Limit Hold'em	2,350	(Romania) Alexandru Papazian (1/2)	$241,128	(Israel) Tal Noach
27	$5,000 Main Event Online Championship	4,092	(Russia) Aleksei Vandyshev (1/1)	$2,543,073	(Brazil) Edson Tsutsumi
28	$2,100 Bounty No Limit Hold'em Championship	1,064	(Poland) Dominik Panka (1/1)	$185,229	(China) Fengdian Wang
29	$1,500 Fifty Stack No Limit Hold'em	1,308	(Ukraine) Vlad Martynenko (1/1)	$250,198	(United States) Faraz Jaka
30	$525 WSOP Beat the Pros	1,594	(Canada) Jase Regina (1/1)	$75,342	(Bulgaria) Stefan Atanasov
31	¥815 WSOP Zodiac Autumn Festival	7,036	(Hong Kong) Henry Luo (1/1)	$87,404	(Argentina) Martin Pochat
32	$210 WSOP Bounty Double Million$	14,162	(Canada) Ruslan Rishko (1/1)	$194,096	(Slovenia) Ales Lekse
33	$500 The Closer	7,103	(France) Arnaud Enselme (1/1)	$360,223	(Japan) Kazuki Ikeuchi

=== Main Event ===
The $5,000 No Limit Hold'em Main Event began on August 22 with the first of 27 starting flights. Players were able to re-enter a maximum of three times. Day 1 survivors returned on September 5 to play down to the final table.

The Main Event attracted 4,092 players, falling $563,000 short of the $20 million guaranteed prize pool. The final table was played on September 11, with the champion earning $2,543,073.

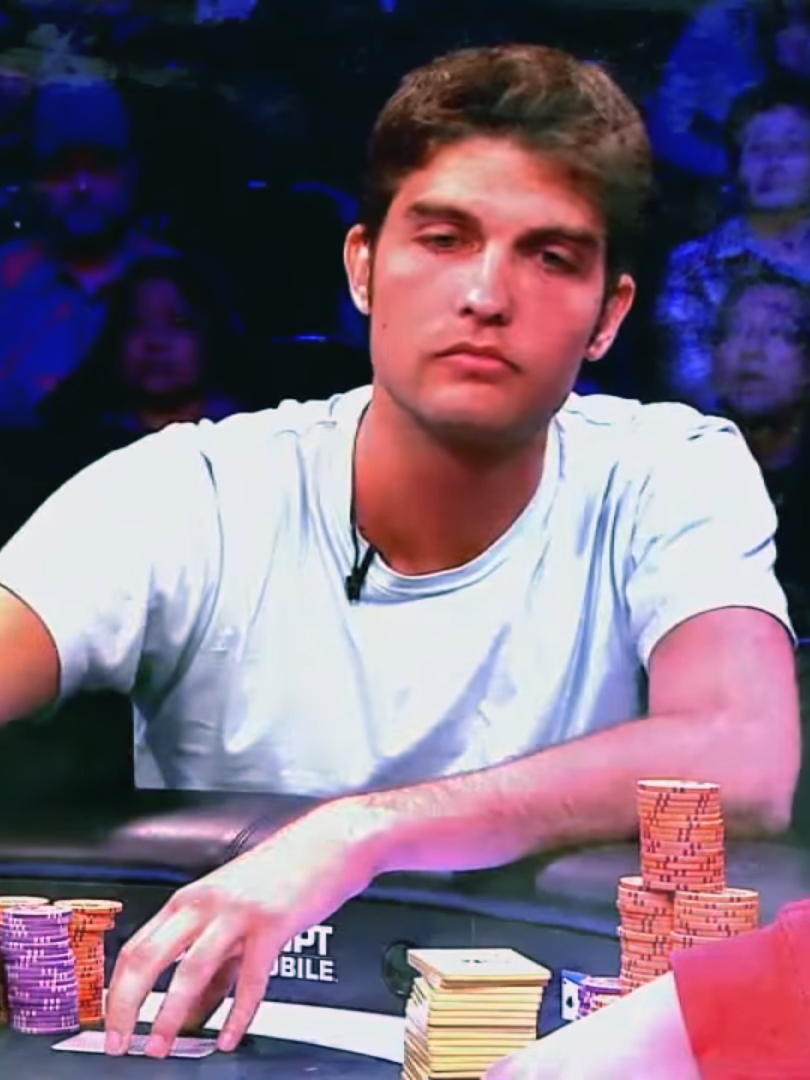
Joe Serock finished in 5th place

Final table
Name	Number of chips (percentage of total)	WSOP Bracelets	WSOP Cashes*	WSOP Earnings*
(Brazil) Edson Tsutsumi	60,403,591 (24.8%)	0	3	$8,567
(Russia) Aleksei Vandyshev	54,232,812 (22.2%)	0	1	$2,889
(United States) Joe Serock	45,567,634 (18.7%)	0	60	$942,761
(Norway) Espen Jørstad	19,575,928 (8.0%)	0	15	$120,048
(Canada) Christine Do	15,918,120 (6.5%)	0	24	$117,772
(Russia) Nikita Kuznetsov	13,454,800 (5.5%)	0	7	$75,393
(Poland) Dawid Smolka	13,154,945 (5.4%)	0	5	$35,051
(Brazil) Renan Meneguetti	12,581,552 (5.2%)	0	3	$8,491
(Greece) Dimitrios Farmakoulis	9,067,144 (3.7%)	0	10	$38,196

*Career statistics prior to the Main Event

Final table results
Place	Name	Prize
1st	Aleksei Vandyshev	$2,543,073
2nd	Edson Tsutsumi	$1,907,035
3rd	Nikita Kuznetsov	$1,430,074
4th	Christine Do	$1,072,405
5th	Joe Serock	$804,191
6th	Espen Jørstad	$603,058
7th	Renan Meneguetti	$452,229
8th	Dawid Smolka	$339,124
9th	Dimitrios Farmakoulis	$254,308
