= Kevin Gerhart =

American poker player

Kevin Gerhart is an American poker player.

== Poker career ==
Gerhart is a four-time bracelet winner at the WSOP. He won his first bracelet in a $1,500 Razz event in 2019. His second bracelet came in the 2020 WSOP Online in a Pot Limit Omaha event. In the 2021 WSOP, he added two more bracelets, one in Pot Limit Omaha Hi/Lo and one in the $10,000 H.O.R.S.E. Championship event.

In December 2019, Gerhart won almost $70,000 in a $600 No Limit Hold'em event at The Wynn Winter Classic.

As of 2024, Gerhart's total live poker tournament winnings exceed $1,300,000.

=== World Series of Poker bracelets ===
Year	Tournament	Prize (US$)
2019	$1,500 Razz	$119,054
2020 O	$500 PLO 6-Handed	$97,572
2021	$10,000 H.O.R.S.E. Championship	$361,124
2021	$1,500 Pot-Limit Omaha Hi-Lo 8 or Better (8-Handed)	$186,789
