= Barry Shulman =

American poker player (born 1946)

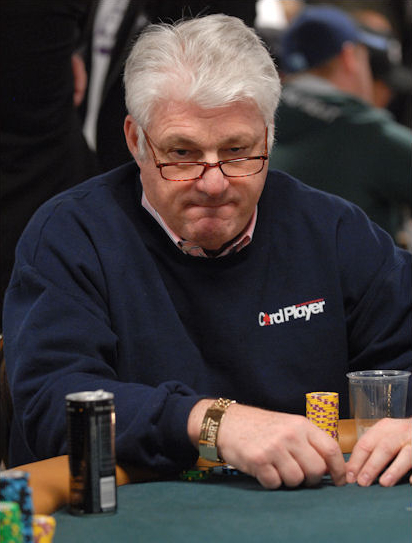
- Shulman in the 2008 World Series of Poker
- Born: May 8, 1946 (age 80)

World Series of Poker
- Bracelets: 2
- Money finishes: 15
- Highest WSOP Main Event finish: None

World Poker Tour
- Title: None
- Final table: 1
- Money finishes: 8

European Poker Tour
- Title: None
- Final table: 1
- Money finish: 1

Barry Shulman (born May 8, 1946) is an American poker player who has enjoyed success in competitive poker tournaments over the past 15 years, and is the CEO of CardPlayer Magazine.

== Life and career ==
Shulman was born in Seattle, Washington. He began playing poker while studying at college in the 1960s. He worked in real estate for 25 years before moving to Las Vegas, Nevada in the early 1990s. He used his retirement funds to purchase Card Player in 1999.

Shulman first finished in the money in a World Series of Poker (WSOP) event in 1997 at the $3,000 pot limit hold'em event. He won a bracelet at the 2001 World Series of Poker in the $1,500 seven card stud hi-lo split 8 or better event.

In October 2003, Shulman made the final table of the World Poker Tour (WPT) Ultimatebet.com Poker Classic II in Aruba. He finished fourth in the event won by Erick Lindgren.

He has also made the final table of a Professional Poker Tour (PPT) event, finishing 2nd in 2005.

On October 2, 2009, he won the World Series of Poker Europe Main Event, beating Daniel Negreanu heads up for the $1,305,542 first place prize.

In January 2010, Shulman finished 3rd in the PokerStars Caribbean Adventure (PCA) Main Event, winning $1,350,000.

As of 2024, his total live tournament winnings exceed $6,000,000. Shulman's 68 WSOP cashes account for $2,303,911 of his tournament winnings total.

Shulman has two sons: Jeff Shulman, president of CardPlayer Media and one of the 2009 November Nine, and Michael Shulman, an American writer and owner of online magazine, ShulmanSays. Shulman also has two stepchildren from his second marriage.

== World Series of Poker bracelets ==
Year	Tournament	Prize (US$)
2001	$1,500 Seven Card Stud Hi-Lo Split 8 or Better	$123,820
2009E	£10,000 No Limit Hold'em Main Event	$1,305,542

An "E" following a year denotes bracelet(s) won at the World Series of Poker Europe

== Bibliography ==
- 52 Tips for Texas Hold 'em Poker (2005) ISBN 0-9758953-0-3
- 52 Tips For No-Limit Texas Hold 'Em Poker (2006) ISBN 0-9758953-1-1
