= 2022 World Series of Poker Online =

Series of online poker tournaments

- Location: Online (WSOP.com and GGPoker)
- Dates: August 14-October 18

Champion
- (Sweden) Simon Eric Mattsson

The 2022 World Series of Poker Online was the third annual series of online poker tournaments organized by the World Series of Poker (WSOP).

== GGPoker Schedule ==
Key: (bracelet number for 2022/bracelet number for career)

#	Event	Entrants	Winner	Prize	Runner-up
1	$500 The Housewarming No-Limit Hold'em	5,099	(Germany) Stefan Schillhabel (1/1)	$296,410	(Brazil) Ramon Kropmanns
2	$1,111 Every 1 for War Relief	730	(Germany) Claas Segebrecht (1/1)	$102,152	(Brazil) Ramon Sfalsin
3	$2,500 Limit Hold'em Championship	124	(Brazil) Rafael Caiaffa (1/1)	$64,671	(China) Jifeng Huang
4	$1,050 Bounty Deepstack No-Limit Hold'em	986	(Italy) Jacopo Olivieri Achille (1/1)	$39,862	(Brazil) Carlos Henrique Ferreira Silva
5	$315 6-Handed Bounty No-Limit Hold'em	2,312	(France) Jon Garde (1/1)	$28,356	(China) Weichao Zhang
6	$800 Monster Stack No-Limit Hold'em	1,797	(Germany) Jonas Lauck (1/2)	$173,224	(Belarus) Ilya Anatski
7	$210 Million Dollar Mystery Bounty	51,003	(Finland) Tapio Vihakas (1/1)	$348,723	(South Korea) Hyunsup Kim
8	$5,000 6-Handed No-Limit Hold'em Championship	430	(Belgium) Pieter Aerts (1/1)	$400,213	(Netherlands) Duco Haven
9	$525 Bounty Pot-Limit Omaha	1,142	(Canada) Ami Barer (1/1)	$23,711	(Finland) Elias Harala
10	$10,000 Heads Up No-Limit Hold'em Championship	97	(Bulgaria) Dimitar Danchev (1/1)	$327,668	(Spain) Valeriano Toledano
11	$400 Double Stack Bounty No-Limit Hold'em	3,550	(Brazil) Gustavo Mastelotto (1/1)	$51,498	(Lithuania) Kasparas Klezys
12	$10,000 Super Million$ High Roller No-Limit Hold'em	593	(New Zealand) David Dong Ming Yan (1/1)	$985,565	(China) Zhewen Hu
13	$1,500 Millionaire Maker No-Limit Hold'em	4,706	(Germany) Markus Prinz (1/1)	$1,188,098	(Poland) Krzysztof Dulowski
14	$2,500 Deepstack Championship No-Limit Hold'em	705	(Russia) Almaz Zhdanov (1/1)	$246,495	(Finland) Toni Kaukua
15	$777 Lucky Sevens Bounty 7-Handed No-Limit Hold'em	1,778	(Taiwan) Pete Chen (1/2)	$53,999	(United States) Gary Thompson
16	$1,500 Ultra Deepstack No-Limit Hold'em	1,156	(United States) Jonathan Gilliam (1/1)	$149,520	(Republic of Ireland) Frank Lillis
17	$500 The Big 500 No-Limit Hold'em	3,142	(Spain) Vicente Delgado (1/1)	$174,497	(Serbia) Milos Petakovic
18	$100 Flip & Go No-Limit Hold'em	13,719	(Peru) Ewald Mahr (1/1)	$143,267	(Serbia) Dmitry Safonov
19	$5,000 Pot-Limit Omaha Championship	272	(Portugal) Rui Neves Ferreira (1/1)	$287,736	(China) Ren Lin
20	$888 Crazy Eights Bounty 8-Handed No-Limit Hold'em	1,922	(Republic of Ireland) Sean Prendiville (1/1)	$66,770	(Russia) Mikhail Frolov
21	$500 Ladies No-Limit Hold'em Championship	362	(Hong Kong) Huanhua Long (1/1)	$31,326	(Canada) Vanessa Kade
22	$1,050 High Roller Freezeout No-Limit Hold'em	2,372	(Spain) Mario Navarro (1/1)	$288,507	(Serbia) Nenad Djukic
23	$400 Plossus	3,850	(United States) Jose Castillo (1/1)	$54,500	(Germany) Marius Kaiser
24	$2,100 Bounty No-Limit Hold'em Championship	985	(Colombia) Hernan Restrepo (1/1)	$79,643	(Netherlands) Duco Haven
25	$315 Superstack Turbo Bounty No-Limit Hold'em	3,015	(France) Jonathan Therme (1/1)	$36,600	(Finland) Tommi Lankinen
26	$1,000 Double Chance No-Limit Hold'em	1,777	(Netherlands) Jans Arends (1/1)	$129,745	(Cyprus) Andreas Christoforou
27	$1,500 Fifty Stack Bounty No-Limit Hold'em	1,597	(Canada) Mark Radoja (1/3)	$95,460	(Austria) Justus Held
28	$400 Colossus	10,090	(Greece) Ourania Zarkantzia (1/1)	$378,508	(Brazil) Alexandre Ragazzi
29	$5,000 Short Deck Championship	145	(United States) Benjamin Miner (1/1)	$172,678	(Ukraine) Oleksii Mezhenkov
30	$840 6-Handed Bounty No-Limit Hold'em	2,024	(Finland) Joni Jouhkimainen (1/1)	$66,004	(Japan) Bruno Ikeda
31	$1,050 Beat the Pros	1,318	(Germany) Claas Segebrecht (2/2)	$54,315	(Israel) Naomie Haddad
32	$500 The Closer No-Limit Hold'em	2,304	(Germany) Marc Radgen (1/1)	$147,983	(Austria) Daniel Rezaei
33	$5,000 WSOP Online Main Event	4,984	(Sweden) Simon Eric Mattsson (1/1)	$2,793,574	(Thailand) Kannapong Thanarattrakul

=== Main Event ===
Final table
Name	Number of chips (percentage of total)	WSOP Bracelets	WSOP Cashes*	WSOP Earnings*
(Sweden) Simon Eric Mattsson	86,134,366 (28.8%)	0	7	$
(Finland) Samuel Vousden	69,324,065 (23.2%)	1	22	$
(Thailand) Kannapong Thanarattrakul	51,616,175 (17.3%)	0	14	$
(Singapore) Feng Zhao	23,782,110 (8.0%)	0	10	$
(China) Yanfei Chi	23,548,633 (7.9%)	0	11	$
(Hungary) Istvan Briski	15,674,935 (5.2%)	0	18	$
(United States) Jordan Spurlin	10,244,278 (3.4%)	0	94	$
(United Kingdom) Oliver Sprason	9,956,760 (3.3%)	0	19	$
(Canada) Timothy Rutherford	8,525,066 (2.9%)	0	13	$

*Career statistics prior to the Main Event

Final table results
Place	Name	Prize
1st	Simon Eric Mattsson	$2,793,574
2nd	Kannapong Thanarattrakul	$2,094,884
3rd	Feng Zhao	$1,570,941
4th	Samuel Vousden	$1,178,040
5th	Istvan Briski	$883,404
6th	Yanfei Chi	$662,459
7th	Jordan Spurlin	$496,774
8th	Oliver Sprason	$372,529
9th	Timothy Rutherford	$279,357

== WSOP.com Schedule ==
Key: (bracelet number for 2022/bracelet number for career)

=== Nevada and New Jersey ===
#	Event	Entrants	Winner	Prize	Runner-up
1	$400 No-Limit Hold'em Series Kick-Off	474	(Israel) Ori Hasson (1/1)	$58,491	(United States) Gary Belyalovsky
2	$500 No-Limit Hold'em Monster Stack	508	(United States) Benjamin Garrick (1/1)	$64,590	(United States) Aditya Sadhu
3	$3,200 No-Limit Hold'em High Roller	99	(United States) Drew O'Connell (1/2)	$96,087	(United States) Shaun O'Donnell (0/1)
4	$1,000 PLO 6-Max	273	(United States) Soheb Porbandarwala (1/1)	$57,125	(United States) Andre Nyffeler
5	$500 No-Limit Hold'em Turbo Deepstack	515	(United States) Christopher Castiglia (1/1)	$44,705	(United States) Zachary Schwartz
6	$800 No-Limit Hold'em Ultra Deepstack	393	(United States) Vito DiStefano (1/1)	$57,356	(United States) Michael Mercaldo (0/1)
7	$365 No-Limit Hold'em	571	(United States) Jeremy Ausmus (2/5)	$51,807	(United States) Nick Schulman (0/3)
8	$1,000 No-Limit Hold'em 6-Max	384	(United States) Jesse Lonis (1/1)	$73,371	(United States) Cole Ferraro (0/1)
9	$600 No-Limit Hold'em Deepstack Championship	515	(United States) Timothy Faro (1/1)	$50,864	(United States) Jeffery Hoop (0/1)
10	$2,500 No-Limit Hold'em	153	(United States) William Romaine (1/2)	$79,754	(United States) Matthew Wantman
11	$400 PLO 6-Max	365	(United States) Tanner Bibat (1/1)	$29,459	(Ukraine) Arkadiy Tsinis (0/1)
12	$400 No-Limit Hold'em Ultra Deepstack	538	(United States) Jesse Yaginuma (1/1)	$47,420	(United States) Paul Dewald
13	$1,000 No-Limit Hold'em	365	(United States) Nathan Zimnik (1/1)	$69,740	(United States) Mark Liedtke
14	$500 No-Limit Hold'em 6-Max	561	(United States) Jeremiah Williams (1/2)	$48,697	(United States) Christopher Basile
15	$365 No-Limit Hold'em Turbo Deepstack	701	(United States) Tanner Bibat (2/2)	$42,053	(United States) Uke Dauti
16	$500 No-Limit Hold'em Deepstack	555	(United States) Connor Stuewe (1/1)	$45,679	(United States) Kevin Garosshen
17	$777 No-Limit Hold'em Lucky 7s	347	(United States) Mike Holtz (1/1)	$76,157	(United States) Jordyn Miller
18	$1,000 No-Limit Hold'em Turbo Deepstack	344	(United States) Michael Gagliano (1/2)	$62,755	(United States) John Riordan
19	$1,500 No-Limit Hold'em	332	(United States) Jordyn Miller (1/1)	$96,915	(United States) Angel Lopez
20	$500 No-Limit Hold'em Turbo	479	(United States) Mark Dibello (1/1)	$41,579	(United States) Matthew Volosevich
21	$600 No-Limit Hold'em 6-Max	448	(United States) Maxx Coleman (2/2)	$46,666	(United States) Bryan Piccioli (0/2)
22	$500 No-Limit Hold'em Big 500	462	(United States) Matthew Paoletti (1/1)	$61,070	(United States) Jesse Lonis (1/1)
23	$1,500 No-Limit Hold'em Freezeout	244	(United States) Michael Mercaldo (1/2)	$68,005	(United States) Joseph Walters
24	$7,777 Lucky 7s High Roller	88	(United States) Jared Strauss (1/1)	$181,769	(United States) Jeremy Ausmus (2/5)
25	$2,000 No-Limit Hold'em 8-Max	228	(United States) Evan Sandberg (1/1)	$94,567	(United States) Kijoon Park (1/1)
26	$3,200 No-Limit Hold'em High Roller 6-Max	149	(United States) Christopher Staats (1/1)	$111,609	(United States) Dan Smith (1/1)
27	$500 No-Limit Hold'em Super Turbo	291	(United States) Patrick Eskandar (1/1)	$37,489	(United States) Peter Braglia
28	$365 No-Limit Hold'em Monster Stack	536	(United States) Desmond Haynes (1/1)	$44,827	(United States) Kenny Han
29	$1,000 No-Limit Hold'em Championship	542	(United States) Frank Funaro (1/1)	$94,096	(United States) John Ypma
30	$5,300 High Roller	85	(United States) Brian Kim (1/1)	$119,000	(United States) Aram Zobian
31	$600 No-Limit Hold'em Deep Freeze	366	(United States) Qinghai Pan (1/1)	$36,148	(United States) Matthew Mendez (0/1)
32	$10,000 No-Limit Hold'em Super High Roller 8-Max	52	(United States) Justin Saliba (1/2)	$154,752	(United States) Jonathan Dokler (0/1)
33	$500 No-Limit Hold'em Fall Finale	640	(United States) Hung Truong (1/1)	$52,675	(United States) Christopher Basile

=== Michigan ===
#	Event	Entrants	Winner	Prize	Runner-up
1	$500 No-Limit Hold'em Monster Stack	174	(United States) Michael Hepworth (1/1)	$18,205	(United States) Christopher Childers
2	$365 No-Limit Hold'em	247	(United States) Christopher Morse (1/1)	$18,164	(United States) George Janssen
3	$400 No-Limit Hold'em Ultra Deepstack	160	(United States) KC Vaughan (1/1)	$15,568	(United States) Carlos Ferreira
4	$777 No-Limit Hold'em Lucky 7s	153	(United States) Thomas Metz (1/1)	$26,389	(United States) Justin Pimpedly
5	$500 No-Limit Hold'em Big 500	170	(United States) Andrew Korby (1/1)	$17,786	(United States) Jerry Delisle
6	$1,000 No-Limit Hold'em Championship	142	(United States) Jonathan Schiller (1/1)	$31,490	(United States) Joseph Cervo

=== Pennsylvania ===
#	Event	Entrants	Winner	Prize	Runner-up
1	$500 No-Limit Hold'em Monster Stack	198	(United States) Richard Ali (1/1)	$20,716	(United States) Casey Hatmaker
2	$365 No-Limit Hold'em	255	(United States) Jeffrey Cole (1/1)	$18,605	(United States) James Tedrow
3	$400 No-Limit Hold'em Ultra Deepstack	250	(United States) Kyle Lorenz (1/1)	$20,259	(United States) Ryan Tamanini
4	$777 No-Limit Hold'em Lucky 7s	169	(United States) Boris Kravets (1/1)	$30,701	(United States) Andrew Voor
5	$500 No-Limit Hold'em Big 500	133	(United States) Andrew Voor (1/1)	$20,507	(United States) Kieth Matesig
6	$1,000 No-Limit Hold'em Championship	129	(United States) Cherish Andrews (1/1)	$31,986	(United States) William Nunley
