= 2025 World Series of Poker Online =

Series of online poker tournaments

- Location: Online (WSOP.com and GGPoker)
- Dates: August 17 - September 29

Champion
- (Austria) Benjamin Rolle

The 2025 World Series of Poker Online was the sixth annual series of online poker tournaments organized by the World Series of Poker (WSOP).

== Series Highlights ==
Austria's Benjamin Rolle won the series’ biggest purse after battling through 5,960 other players in the Main Event to claim $3.9 million and the most coveted bracelet of the series.

On the opposite end of the buy-in spectrum, Event #7: $215 Mystery Millions proved that dreams don't require a massive bankroll. Over 53,000 entries generated a $10.6 million prize pool, with Brazil's ‘Gboro21’ outlasting the chaos to secure nearly $600,000.

The final event lived up to its billing. Brazil's Rodrigo Selouan closed out the series in style, taking down the GGMillion$ High Rollers event for over $2 million after the field crushed its $10 million guarantee by nearly 50%.

== GGPoker schedule ==
Played from August 17 to September 29, 2025.

#	Event	Entrants	Winner	Prize	Runner-up
1	$500 6th Annual WSOP Kick-off Bounty	4,047	(Spain) Oihan Abarzuza (1/1)	$86,299+bounties	(Italy) Alessandro Pagliuso
2	$300 No-Limit Hold'em Gladiators of Poker	13,077	(Spain) Sergi Reixach (1/1)	$465,614	(Belarus) Mikita Bratchenia
3	$2,100 No-Limit Hold'em Bounty Championship	803	(Brazil) Dante Goya (1/2)	$95,228+bounties	(Israel) Oshri Lahmani
4	$840 Bounty Pot-Limit Omaha	908	(Brazil) Arthur Ebrahim (1/1)	$46,358+bounties	(Israel) Alan Mor
5	$1,000 Double Chance NLH 2-Stack	1,110	(Israel) Ravid Garbi (1/2)	$133,656	
6	$1,500 Monster Stack NLH	1,399	(Brazil) Léo Jokura (1/1)	$247,557	
7	$215 Mystery Millions $1M Top Bounty	53,758	(Brazil) Adrovan Rodrigues (1/1)	$576,252+bounties	(Taiwan) Yu Yung Lin
8	$2,500 Turbo NLH Championship	540	(Canada) Mark Radoja (1/4)	$182,565	(United States) David Peters (0/4)
9	$320 Bounty NLH	3,881	(Norway) Sander Ostlyngen (1/1)	$53,610+bounties	
10	$500 Ladies NLH Championship	263	(Brazil) Barbara Akemi (1/1)	$20,537	(Sweden) Noelia Ivars Rico
11	$100 FLIP & GO NLH	14,769	(Brazil) Victor Lima (1/1)	$176,932	
12	$500 Mini Main Event NLH	11,367	(China) Song Hui (1/1)	$681,610	(France) Corentin Soulier
13	$5,000 6-Handed NLH Championship	542	(Israel) Arie Miller (1/1)	$413,376	
14	$500 THE BIG $500 Bounty NLH	3,370	(China) Kun Liu (1/1)	$73,851+bounties	
15	$1,000 5-Card Pot-Limit Omaha	797	(Israel) Liran Machluf (1/1)	$110,015	(Belgium) Davidi Kitai (0/3)
16	$215 Beat the Pros Bounty NLH	7,013	(Canada) Alex Fortin-Demers (1/1)	$60,244+bounties	
17	$1,500 Millionaire Maker	5,920	(Sweden) Simon Eric Mattsson (1/3)	$1,271,600	(China) Kun Liu (1/1)
18	$5,000 Short Deck Championship 3-Stack	89	(Russia) Evgenii Akimov (1/1)	$99,170	(Republic of Ireland) Dwyer Tobin
19	$777 LUCKY SEVENS Bounty 7-Handed NLH	2,503	(United States) Eric Yanovsky (1/1)	$98,763+bounties	(Hungary) Bernard Larabi
20	$800 Ultra Deepstack NLH	1,803	(Brazil) Iago Botelho (1/1)	$158,759	(Italy) Alessio La Francesca
21	$1,500 WSOP GGMasters HR Freezeout NLH	1,392	(Malta) "Look@This"	$299,801	(Austria) Max Neugebauer (0/1)
22	$400 COLOSSUS	14,803	(Serbia) Nenad Djukic (1/1)	$692,842	(Brazil) Oscar Cueva
23	$400 PLOSSUS Bounty	4,630	(Russia) Kirill Shugai (1/1)	$75,753+bounties	(Canada) Lucas Greenwood
24	$10,000 Pot-Limit Omaha Championship	183	(United Arab Emirates) "Kolialma"	$361,153	(Hungary) Sebestyen Balint
25	$525 Superstack Turbo Bounty NLH	3,075	(Argentina) Alejandro Andion (1/1)	$75,003+bounties	(Hungary) Andras Nemeth
26	$10,000 Heads Up NLH Championship	120	(France) Ivan Deyra (1/2)	$343,962	(Canada) Mark Radoja (1/4)
27	$1,050 Mystery Bounty Pot-Limit Omaha	1,064	(Sweden) Michal Danka (1/1)	$75,255	(Colombia) Fernando Gutierrez
28	$5,000 WSOP Online Main Event	5,961	(Germany) Benjamin Rolle (1/1)	$3,900,708	(Russia) Anatoly Zlotnikov
29	$25,000 GGMillion$ SHR Championship	192	(Bulgaria) Fahredin Mustafov (1/2)	$941,797	
30	$2,100 6-Handed Bounty NLH	1,315	(Germany) Manfred Hermann (1/1)	$158,020+bounties	
31	$5,000 Pot-Limit Omaha High Roller	303	(China) "lanlanzi"	$252,294	
32	$1,500 The Closer NLH Bounty Turbo	2,386	(Argentina) Agustin Naranja (1/1)	$178,790+bounties	
33	$10,300 GGMillion$ High Rollers	1,484	(Brazil) Rodrigo Selouan (1/1)	$2,003,850	

=== Main Event ===
Benjamin Rolle, also known online as "bencb789", has captured his first WSOP bracelet by winning the 2025 WSOP Online Main Event taking home a massive $3,900,707. The $5,000 buy-in tournament attracted 5,961 entries, generating a prize pool of $28,314,750.

Final table
Name	Number of chips (percentage of total)	WSOP Bracelets	WSOP Cashes*	WSOP Earnings*
(Austria) Benjamin Rolle	75,645,533 (21.16%)	0	??	??
(Russia) Anatoly Zlotnikov	63,798,556 (17.84%)	0	??	??
(Germany) Daniel Smiljkovic	46,075,943 (12.89%)	1	??	??
(Canada) Santiago Plante	45,166,830 (12.66%)	0	??	??
(China) Zengxiang Chen	30,911,256 (8.65%)	0	??	??
(Argentina) Marco Agustin Perez	27,218,630 (7.61%)	0	??	??
(Cyprus) Andreas Christoforou	27,204,300 (7.61%)	0	??	??
(Israel) Amit Ben Yacov	26,173,736 (7.32%)	2	??	??
(Austria) Felix Rabas	15,324,904 (4.29%)	0	??	??

*Career statistics prior to the Main Event - (WSOP Earnings database)

Final table results
Place	Name	Prize
1st	(Austria) Benjamin Rolle	$3,900,707.81
2nd	(Russia) Anatoly Zlotnikov	$3,006,762.64
3rd	(Austria) Felix Rabas	$2,318,640.32
4th	(Germany) Daniel Smiljkovic	$1,788,026.95
5th	(Argentina) Marco Agustin Perez	$1,378,866.28
6th	(Canada) Santiago Plante	$1,063,360.33
7th	(Cyprus) Andreas Christoforou	$820,072.82
8th	(Israel) Amit Ben Yacov	$632,473.33
9th	(China) Zengxiang Chen	$487,813.33

=== GGPoker Canada (Ontario) ===
#	Event	Entrants	Winner	Prize	Runner-up
1	$219 Gladiators of Poker Ontario Opener	2,466	(Canada) Joseph Gao (1/1)	$62,493	
2	$154 Mystery Millions		"HaveALaugh"	$43,050	
3	$73 Mini Main Event NLH		"JJ_Abraham"	$39,485	
4	$1,097 Monster Stack NLH	265	(Canada) Joseph Gao (2/2)	$62,394	
5	$292 PLOssus	1,980	(Canada) Keani Fairbanks (1/1)	$51,118	
6	$292 Colossus	760	(Canada) Renmei Liu (1/1)	$76,733	
7	$731 WSOP Ontario Main Event	1,955	(Canada) Peter Chien (1/1)	$179,211	
8	$384 Closer NLH		(Canada) Anh Dung Nguyen (1/1)	$72,845	

== WSOP.com schedule ==
#	Event	Entrants	Winner	Prize	Runner-up
1	$500 NLHE Mystery Bounty			$	
2	$1,000 NLHE 6-Max			$	
3	$777 NLHE Lucky 7s		(United States) Tyler Hirschfeld (1/2)	$65,702	
4	$400 NLHE		(United States) Brian Lau (1/1)	$54,597	
5	$600 NLHE 6-Max		"Helion"	$55,112	
6	$500 NLHE Ultra Deepstack	804	(United States) Josh Arieh (1/7)	$67,657	
7	$2,000 NLHE Big PKO	199	(United States) Nick Palma (1/1)	$78,999	
8	$3,200 NLHE High Roller 6-Max			$	
9	$500 PLO 6-Max			$	
10	$600 NLHE Monsterstack			$	
11	$500 NLHE Mystery Bounty			$	
12	$888 NLHE Fall Crazy 8's			$	
13	$1,000 NLHE			$	
14	$500 NLHE Freezeout			$	
15	$500 NLHE PKO			$	
16	$1,000 NLHE Mystery Bounty Championship			$	
17	$333 NLHE Triple 3s Tip Off			$	
18	$1,000 NLHE 6-Max			$	
19	$400 PLOssus PKO 6-Max			$	
20	$600 NLHE Deepstack Championship			$	
21	$500 PLO Mystery Bounty 6-Max			$	
22	$1,000 NLHE 6-Max			$	
23	$888 NLHE Fall Crazy 8s			$	
24	$500 NLHE			$	
25	$1,000 NLHE Online Championship			$	
26	$500 NLHE			$	
27	$250 NLHE Mystery Bounty			$	
28	$400 Colossus			$	
29	$500 NLHE			$	
30	$1,000 NLHE Deepstack			$	
31	$400 NLHE Mystery Bounty			$	
32	$3,200 NLHE High Roller Championship			$	
33	$500 NLHE Fall Saver			$	
