= John Tabatabai =

Welsh poker player

- Nickname: Kunkuwap

World Series of Poker
- Bracelet: None
- Money finish: 1
- Highest WSOP Main Event finish: None

John Tabatabai is a Welsh professional poker player (Lisvane, Cardiff) based in London, England. He was the runner-up to Norwegian poker player Annette Obrestad in the first World Series of Poker Europe Main Event.

== Education ==
Tabatabai was a Law graduate of the University of Reading.

== Early chess career ==
Before embarking on a professional poker playing career, Tabatabai was a chess player. He represented Wales in numerous international competitions as a junior.

== Poker ==
=== World Series of Poker Europe ===
In the final hand Annette Obrestad had a slight chip lead with 3,851,000 over Tabatabai with 3,381,000. In the small blind flat, called Obrestad's big blind, Obrestad raised the pot from 68,000 to 138,000. Tabatabai flat called the preflop raise which brought the pot to 208,000. The flop was 7♣ 6♣ 5♥ and Obrestad lead out with a 250,000 bet, bringing the pot to 458,000. Tabatabai re-raised an additional 750,000. Obrestad then went all-in, which was called by Tabatabai who had flopped two pair with 5♠ 6♦, however Obrestad had flopped top set with 7♥ 7♠. Tabatabai was in need of two running cards (fives or sixes) to win the hand or two running cards for a straight; the turn brought the 2♣, securing Obrestad the win. The irrelevant river card was the Q♥.

Tabatabai earned £570,150 for his second-place finish.

=== Other Events ===
In March 2008 John Tabatabai won the 12th All Africa Poker Tournament collecting the one million Rand ($127,584) pot.

In January 2009, John won the $5,000au heads up event in Australia for $120,000au.

As of November 2010, his live tournament earnings exceed $1,360,000. His lone cash at the WSOP accounts for $912,240 of those winnings.
