= World Series of Poker Europe =

Poker tournament

WSOP logo

The World Series of Poker Europe (WSOPE) is the first expansion effort of World Series of Poker-branded poker tournaments outside the United States. Since 1970, participants had to travel to Las Vegas if they wanted to compete in the World Series of Poker (WSOP). Although the WSOP held circuit events in other locations, the main tournaments, which awarded bracelets to the winners, were exclusively held in Las Vegas. The inaugural WSOPE, held in 2007, marked the first time that a WSOP bracelet was awarded outside Las Vegas. From its inception to the 2013 tournament, players from 19 countries — USA (10), France (4), UK (3), Denmark (3), Canada (2), Norway (2), Portugal (2), Italy (2), Afghanistan, Germany, Indonesia, Spain, New Zealand, Sweden, Tunisia, Switzerland, Australia, Italy and Finland — have won bracelets.

== History ==
In 2004, Harrah's Casinos purchased the rights to the WSOP label. Harrah's later purchased London Clubs International (LCI). LCI operates three casinos in the London area—Playboy, Empire Casino, and The Sportsman. After the purchase of these casinos, Harrah's decided to expand its WSOP label into Europe. European casinos typically have a different environment than those in the U.S. Jeffrey Pollack, the WSOP Commissioner, indicated that the WSOPE would have a "style and flair that is both unique and appropriate to the setting. So don't be surprised if we require participants to wear blazers at the tables. If James Bond were hosting a poker tournament it may look like the World Series of Poker Europe."

The WSOPE was entering a crowded field as many major poker tournaments were already established in Europe. Pollack, however, believed that brand recognition of the WSOP and that the "WSOP bracelet is the most recognized poker hardware globally will allow the WSOPE to quickly catch up."

== Highlights ==
=== 2007 World Series of Poker Europe ===
In marketing the WSOPE, Harrah's Casino did not rely upon the reputation of Harrah's or the WSOP alone. On July 5, 2007, Harrah's announced its alliance with England-based Betfair, one of the largest online gaming companies in the world. The agreement builds on Betfair's European reputation in advertising the WSOPE while creating the largest agreement between a web-based and brick-and-mortar casinos. Due to changes in U.S. laws, effective in 2007, the WSOP could no longer accept money from online gambling companies. This prevented the WSOP from acknowledging WSOP qualifiers from online events. The WSOPE is not bound by this limitation. The United Kingdom Gambling Act of 2005 allows for legal regulated online poker sites. Furthermore, as the laws that govern the age of gambling differ in England than the U.S., the WSOPE admits younger players. In 2007, four of the five finalists at the first event of the WSOPE had won bracelets. Thomas Bihl, however, outlasted each of them to claim the first-ever WSOPE bracelet. No previous bracelet winners played at the second final table; Dario Alioto won the bracelet. Annette "Annette_15" Obrestad, became the youngest player to win a WSOP bracelet event at age 18 years, 364 days in the final event of the tournament.

=== 2008 World Series of Poker Europe ===
In 2008, the WSOPE added a fourth event and was held at the Empire Casino in Leicester Square, London. The 2008 WSOPE was particularly notable, as Jesper Hougaard became the first person to win a bracelet at both the WSOP and WSOPE, let alone winning both in a single year. The WSOPE Main Event included several big name stars including Ivan Demidov, John Juanda and Daniel Negreanu. Demidov's appearance at the WSOPE final table was of particular interest. While sitting at the WSOPE Main event final table, he was one of the November Nine players scheduled to play in November for the WSOP Main Event. This meant that for a period of time there was a chance that the same person could win both Main Events. As it was, he was the first player to make it to the final table at both the WSOP and WSOPE Main Events. Three-time bracelet winner John Juanda won his fourth bracelet in the WSOPE Main Event. Theo Jørgensen, who made it to the 2007 WSOPE Main Event final table, won his first bracelet in the £5,000 Pot-Limit Omaha event. Sherkhan Farnood, undoubtedly had the most challenging final table as four of his final six opponents (Ivo Donev, Howard Lederer, Phil Ivey, and Jeff Lisandro) had a combined 9 WSOP bracelets between them. The 2008 WSOPE also marked a technological advance with the advent of the mobile hole card camera. At previous tournaments, the viewing audience could only see the hole cards at select tables. In 2008, a special camera was used that enabled roaming camera crews to capture the action at adjacent tables.

=== 2009 World Series of Poker Europe ===
The 2009 WSOPE was held from September 17 to October 1 at the Empire Casino in London, England. It consisted of four bracelet events including a £1,000 No-Limit Hold'em, a £2,500 Pot Limit Hold'em/Pot-Limit Omaha, a £5,000 Pot Limit Omaha, and a £10,000 World Championship No-Limit Hold'em Main Event.

=== 2010 World Series of Poker Europe ===
The 2010 World Series of Poker Europe was held from September 14 to September 28 at the Empire Casino in London, England. There were five bracelet events, culminating in the £10,350 WSOPE Championship No Limit Hold'em event which was won by James Bord, the first WSOPE bracelet winner from the UK.

=== 2011 World Series of Poker Europe ===
The 2011 WSOPE Event was held at the Majestic Barrière Cannes and the Le Croisette Casino Barrière in Cannes. There were seven bracelet events.

=== 2012 World Series of Poker Europe ===
The 2012 WSOPE Event returned to Cannes – again with seven bracelet events. Phil Hellmuth won the main event to become the first player to win both the Main Event of WSOP and WSOPE.

=== 2013 World Series of Poker Europe ===
For 2013 the tournament moved to the Casino Barriere in Enghien-les-Bains, France. From October 11 to October 23 there were eight bracelet events.

=== 2014 World Series of Poker Europe ===
In November 2013 it was announced that the WSOP Europe and WSOP Asia Pacific will begin rotating annually beginning in 2014, with WSOP APAC being held in even-numbered years and WSOPE in odd-numbered years. Therefore, the WSOP Europe was not held in 2014 or 2016.

=== 2015 World Series of Poker Europe ===
For 2015 the tournament moved to Spielbank Berlin in Berlin, Germany. From October 8 to October 24 there are ten bracelet events.

=== 2017 World Series of Poker Europe ===
The 2017 WSOPE took place from October 19 – November 10 in at King's Casino in Rozvadov, Czech Republic. There were 11 bracelet events, including the €111,111 High Roller for One Drop, the largest buy-in in WSOPE history. The €10,350 No Limit Hold'em Main Event attracted 529 entries and was won by Spanish qualifier Marti Roca de Torres.

=== 2018 World Series of Poker Europe ===
The 2018 WSOPE is scheduled from October 9, 2018 through November 2, 2018 at King's Casino in Rozvadov, Czech Republic. There were 10 bracelet events, including a €5 million guarantee for the €10,350 No Limit Hold'em Main Event.

=== 2019 World Series of Poker Europe ===
The 2019 WSOPE took place from October 13, 2019 through November 4, 2019 at King's Casino in Rozvadov, Czech Republic. There were 15 bracelet events, including a €5 million guarantee for the €10,350 No Limit Hold'em Main Event. Live event and on demand coverage streamed exclusively on PokerGO.

=== 2021 World Series of Poker Europe ===
The 2021 WSOPE was the 13th edition of the series of poker tournaments. It took place from November 19 to December 8 at King's Casino in Rozvadov, Czech Republic and featured 15 WSOP bracelet events. On November 25, the Czech government declared a state of emergency as a result of rising COVID-19 cases in the country. The WSOP Europe proceeded as planned, but all events had to conclude by 10 p.m. local time to comply with curfew restrictions.

=== 2022 World Series of Poker Europe ===
The 2022 WSOPE took place from October 26, 2022 through November 16, 2022, at King's Resort in Rozvadov, Czech Republic. There were 15 WSOP bracelet events and $12 million in prize pool guarantees. The 2022 WSOP Europe Main Event would be the largest ever, with the 763-entrant field breaking the record set in 2021 of 688 entrants.

=== 2023 World Series of Poker Europe ===
The 2023 WSOPE took place from October 25, 2023 through November 15, 2023, at King's Resort in Rozvadov, Czech Republic. There were 15 bracelet events and €15 million in prize pool guarantees. The €10,350 Main Event No-Limit Hold'em European Championship had a €5 million prize pool guarantee and was won by former professional basketballer Max Neugebauer. It broke the record for largest WSOP Europe Main Event for the third consecutive year.

=== 2024 World Series of Poker Europe ===
The 2024 WSOPE took place from September 18, 2024 through October 9, 2024 at King's Resort in Rozvadov, Czech Republic. There were 15 bracelet events, including the €10,350 No-Limit Hold'em Main Event.

=== 2025 World Series of Poker Europe ===
The 2025 WSOPE took place from September 17, 2025 through October 8, 2025 at King's Resort in Rozvadov, Czech Republic. There were 15 bracelet events, including the €10,350 No-Limit Hold'em Main Event.

== Main Event winners ==
| Year | Winner | Winning hand | Prize | Entrants | Runner-up | Losing hand |
|---|---|---|---|---|---|---|
| 2007 | (Norway) Annette Obrestad | 7♥ 7♠ | £1,000,000 | 362 | (United Kingdom) John Tabatabai | 5♠ 6♦ |
| 2008 | (Indonesia) John Juanda | K♠ 6♣ | £868,800 | 362 | (Russia) Stanislav Alekhin | A♣ 9♠ |
| 2009 | (United States) Barry Shulman | 10♠ 10♣ | £801,603 | 334 | (Canada) Daniel Negreanu | 4♠ 4♦ |
| 2010 | (United Kingdom) James Bord | 10♦ 10♥ | £830,401 | 346 | (Italy) Fabrizio Baldassari | 5♠ 5♥ |
| 2011 | (United States) Elio Fox | A♦ 10♠ | €1,400,000 | 593 | (United Kingdom) Chris Moorman | A♥ 7♠ |
| 2012 | (United States) Phil Hellmuth | A♥ 10♦ | €1,022,376 | 420 | (Ukraine) Sergii Baranov | A♠ 4♣ |
| 2013 | (Spain) Adrián Mateos | A♠ K♣ | €1,000,000 | 375 | (France) Fabrice Soulier | 9♦ 8♦ |
| 2015 | (United States) Kevin MacPhee | A♦ 4♦ | €883,000 | 313 | (Spain) David Lopez | K♥ K♣ |
| 2017 | (Spain) Marti Roca de Torres | Q♥ 5♦ | €1,115,207 | 529 | (Italy) Gianluca Speranza | 10♠ 8♦ |
| 2018 | (United Kingdom) Jack Sinclair | Q♥ 9♣ | €1,122,239 | 534 | (Hungary) Laszlo Bujtas | J♦ 7♠ |
| 2019 | (Greece) Alexandros Kolonias | A♠ K♠ | €1,133,678 | 541 | (Germany) Claas Segebrecht | 3♦ 3♣ |
| 2021 | (Czech Republic) Josef Guláš | A♦ 10♠ | €1,276,712 | 688 | (France) Johan Guilbert | 2♣ 2♥ |
| 2022 | (Sweden) Omar Eljach | Q♠ Q♦ | €1,380,129 | 763 | (France) Jonathan Pastore | A♣ 8♦ |
| 2023 | (Austria) Max Neugebauer | J♠ 8♣ | €1,500,000 | 817 | (Taiwan) Eric Tsai | J♦ 9♦ |
| 2024 | (Italy) Simone Andrian | 10♥ 10♣ | €1,300,000 | 768 | (Estonia) Urmo Velvelt | A♥ 10♠ |
| 2025 | (Germany) Daniel Pidun | A♣ A♥ | €1,140,000 | 659 | (Austria) Gerald Karlic | J♠ J♣ |
