= 2010 World Series of Poker Europe =

Series of poker tournaments

The fourth World Series of Poker Europe (WSOPE) took place from 14 September 2010 to 28 September 2010.There were five bracelet events, culminating in the £10,350 WSOPE Championship No-Limit Hold'em event. Events were held at the Empire Casino in Leicester Square.

== Key ==
*	Elected to the Poker Hall of Fame
(#/#)	This denotes a bracelet winner. The first number is the number of bracelets won in 2010. The second number is the total number of bracelets won. Both numbers represent totals as of that point during the tournament.
Place	What place each player finished
Name	The player who made it to the final table
Prize (£)	The amount of money, in British Pounds (£), awarded for each finish at the event's final table

== Results ==
=== Event 1: £2,650 Six Handed No Limit Hold'em ===
- 3-Day Event: 14 September 2010 to 16 September 2010
- Number of buy-ins: 244
- Total Prize Pool: £610,000
- Number of Payouts: 24
- Winning Hand: K♦ 5♣

Final Table
Place	Name	Prize
1st	Phil Laak (1/1)	£170,802
2nd	Andrew Pantling	£105,506
3rd	Chris Bjorin (0/2)	£70,473
4th	David Peters	£48,202
5th	Ilan Rouah	£33,617
6th	Willie Tann (0/1)	£23,900

=== Event 2: £5,250 Pot Limit Omaha ===
- 3-Day Event: 16 September 2010 to 18 September 2010
- Number of buy-ins: 120
- Total Prize Pool: £600,000
- Number of Payouts: 18
- Winning Hand: A♠ 6♠ Q♠ 2♣

Final Table
Place	Name	Prize
1st	Jeff Lisandro (1/5)	£159,514
2nd	Joe Serock	£98,262
3rd	Willie Tann (0/1)	£71,184
4th	Jeff Madsen (0/2)	£52,542
5th	John Racener	£39,486
6th	Karl Mahrenholz	£30,192
7th	Felipe Ramos	£23,478
8th	Jeff Kimber	£18,564
9th	Chris Bjorin (0/2)	£14,916

=== Event 3: £1,075 No Limit Hold'em ===
- 5-Day Event: 17 September 2010 to 21 September 2010
- Number of buy-ins: 582
- Total Prize Pool: £582,000
- Number of Payouts: 54
- Winning Hand: 3♣ 3♥

Final Table
Place	Name	Prize
1st	Scott Shelley (1/1)	£133,857
2nd	J.P. Kelly (0/2)	£82,854
3rd	Jeppe Bisgaard	£55,063
4th	Paul Pitchford	£40,862
5th	Kaveh Payman	£30,666
6th	Mehdi Senhaji	£23,239
7th	Jack Lyman	£17,768
8th	Karim Jomeen	£13,694
9th	Nicky Katz	£10,633

=== Event 4: £10,350 No Limit Hold'em High Roller Heads-Up ===
- 3-Day Event: 21 September 2010 to 23 September 2010
- Number of buy-ins: 103
- Total Prize Pool: £1,030,000
- Number of Payouts: 16
- Winning Hand: 4♥ 4♦

Final Table
Place	Name	Prize
1st	Gus Hansen (1/1)	£288,409
2nd	Jim Collopy	£178,211
SF	Ram Vaswani (0/1)	£96,212
SF	Andrew Feldman	£96,212
QF	Daniel Negreanu (0/4)	£47,045
QF	Kevin Eyster	£47,045
QF	Huck Seed (0/4)	£47,045
QF	Neil Channing	£47,045

=== Event 5: £10,350 WSOPE Championship No Limit Hold'em ===
- 6-Day Event: 23 September 2010 to 28 September 2010
- Number of buy-ins: 346
- Total Prize Pool: £3,460,000
- Number of Payouts: 36
- Winning Hand: 10♦ 10♥

Final Table
Place	Name	Prize
1st	James Bord (1/1)	£830,401
2nd	Fabrizio Baldassari	£513,049
3rd	Ronald Lee	£376,829
4th	Roland De Wolfe (0/1)	£278,945
5th	Nicolas Levi	£208,119
6th	Daniel Steinberg	£156,530
7th	Dan Fleyshman	£118,643
8th	Brian Powell	£90,617
9th	Marc Inizan	£69,754
