= 2024 World Series of Poker Europe =

Series of poker tournaments

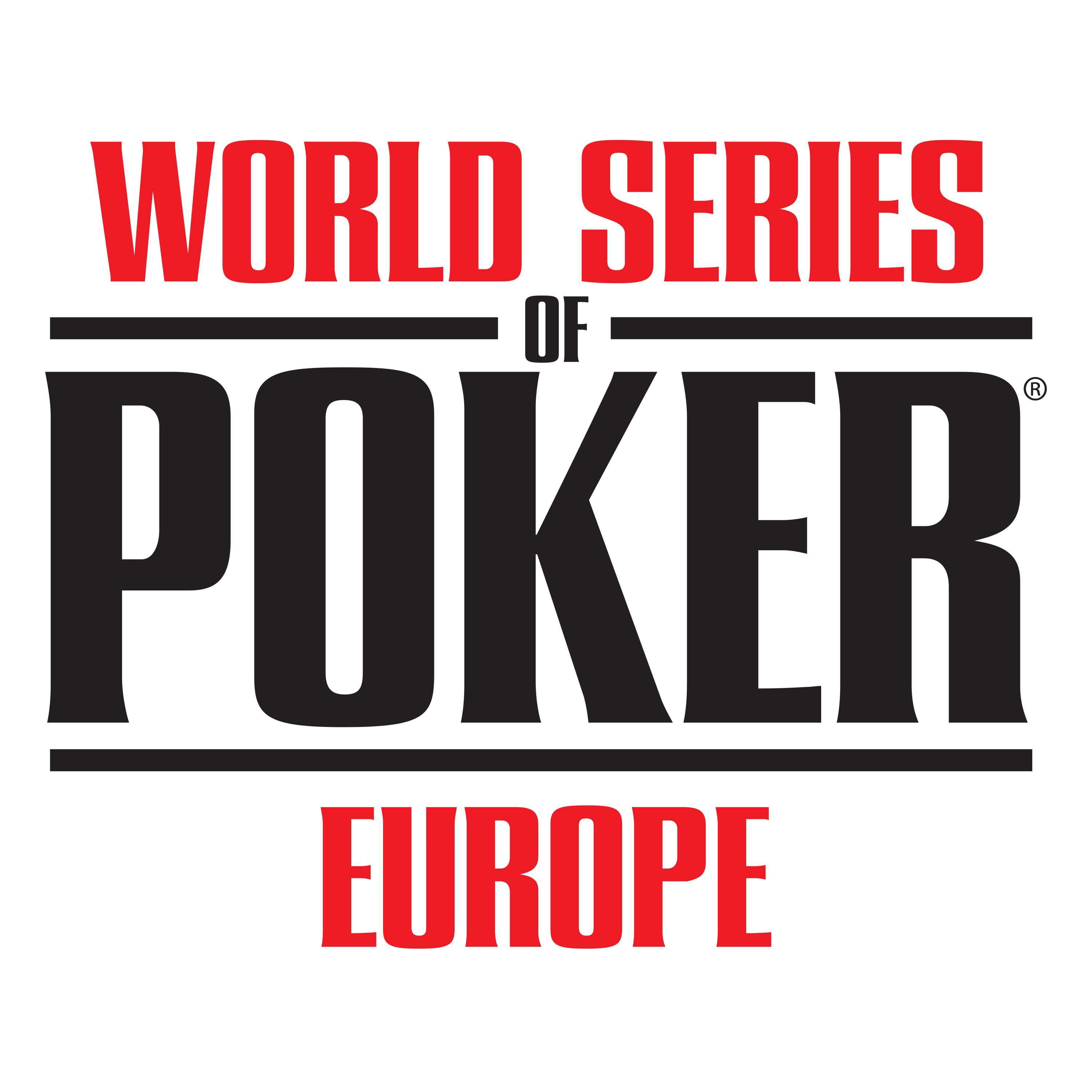
- Location: King's Resort, Rozvadov, Czech Republic
- Dates: September 18 - October 9

Champion
- (Italy) Simone Andrian

The 2024 World Series of Poker Europe (WSOPE) was the 15th annual World Series of Poker Europe. It was held from September 18-October 9 at King's Resort in Rozvadov, Czech Republic.

There were 15 bracelet events, including the €10,350 No-Limit Hold'em Main Event. Martin Kabrhel won the €50,000 Diamond High Roller for his third WSOP bracelet, while Vivian Saliba began the first woman to win an open WSOP event since 2021 when she won the €2,000 Pot-Limit Omaha event.

== Event schedule ==
#	Event	Entrants	Winner	Prize	Runner-up
1	€350 No-Limit Hold'em Opener	3,509	(Poland) Przemyslaw Szymanski (1/1)	€115,350	(Germany) Daniel Trunk
2	€550 Pot-Limit Omaha	642	(Ukraine) Volodymyr Kokoulin (1/1)	€56,100	(Poland) Tomasz Kozub
3	€1,350 Mini Main Event	1,286	(Italy) Christopher Campisano (1/1)	€213,950	(Belgium) Frederic Marechal
4	€2,000 Pot-Limit Omaha	229	(Brazil) Vivian Saliba (1/1)	€91,400	(Germany) Markus Anheier
5	€550 No-Limit Hold'em Colossus	2,799	(Czech Republic) Michal Schuh (1/1)	€171,350	(Netherlands) Erik van Hulst
6	€5,000 Pot-Limit Omaha	141	(Germany) Dennis Weiss (1/1)	€159,897	(Germany) Amir Mozaffarian
7	€1,650 No-Limit Hold'em 6-Max	351	(Italy) Ermanno Di Nicola (1/2)	€111,250	(South Korea) Dohang Na
8	€25,000 No-Limit Hold'em GGMillion€	38	(Italy) Alessandro Pichierri (1/2)	€335,900	(United States) Alex Foxen (0/1)
9	€1,100 No-Limit Hold'em Mystery Bounty	515	(Germany) Amir Mozaffarian (1/1)	€69,050	(Germany) Paco Kaplan
10	€2,000 8-Game Mix	90	(France) Patrick Bueno (1/1)	€43,400	(Germany) Daniel Habl
11	€1,100 No-Limit Hold'em Turbo Bounty Hunter	458	(Romania) Darius Neagoe (1/1)	€63,650	(Belarus) Nikolay Traskevich
12	€50,000 No-Limit Hold'em Diamond High Roller	30	(Czech Republic) Martin Kabrhel (1/3)	€529,000	(Germany) Sirzat Hissou
13	€10,350 No-Limit Hold'em Main Event	768	(Italy) Simone Andrian (2/3)	€1,300,000	(Estonia) Urmo Velvelt
14	€1,000 No-Limit Hold'em Turbo Freezeout	152	(China) Zewei Ding (1/1)	€35,351	(Armenia) Stepan Khachaturyan
15	€550 No-Limit Hold'em Closer	473	(Germany) Marius Schneider (1/1)	€44,000	(Romania) Tiberiu Tirca

== Main Event ==
The €10,350 No-Limit Hold'em began on October 4. The event attracted 768 entries, building a prize pool of €7,219,200. The top 116 players finished in the money, while the champion earned €1,300,000.

=== Final Table ===
Name	Number of chips (percentage of total)	WSOP Bracelets	WSOP Cashes*	WSOP Earnings*
(Italy) Simone Andrian	33,500,000 (43.4%)	2	25	$718,407
(Estonia) Urmo Velvelt	15,600,000 (21.0%)	0	24	$443,808
(Poland) Mariusz Golinski	13,525,000 (17.5%)	0	16	€52,333
(Israel) Ran Ilani	6,425,000 (8.3%)	0	58	€605,294
(Germany) David Hochheim	4,525,000 (5.9%)	0	0	0
(Italy) Enrico Camosci	3,675,000 (4.8%)	1	25	€974,675

*career statistics prior to the 2024 WSOPE Main Event

=== Final Table results ===
Place	Name	Prize
1	(Italy) Simone Andrian (2/3)	€1,300,000
2	(Estonia) Urmo Velvelt	€854,000
3	(Israel) Ran Ilani	€590,000
4	(Poland) Mariusz Golinski	€415,000
5	(Germany) David Hochheim	€297,000
6	(Italy) Enrico Camosci	€217,000
7	(Sweden) Robin Berggren	€161,000
8	(Serbia) Luka Bojovic	€122,000
