= Mark Radoja =

Canadian poker player (born 1985)

- Born: 1985 (age 40–41)

World Series of Poker
- Bracelets: 2
- Final tables: 4
- Money finishes: 19
- Highest WSOP Main Event finish: None

World Poker Tour
- Title: None
- Final table: None
- Money finishes: 2

European Poker Tour
- Title: None
- Final table: None
- Money finishes: 2

Mark Radoja (born 1985) is a Canadian professional poker player. He has won two World Series of Poker bracelets. As of 2013, his total live tournament winnings exceed $1,500,000. $1,469,638 of his winnings have come at the WSOP.

World Series of Poker Bracelets
Year	Tournament	Prize (US$)
2011	$5,000 No Limit Hold'em - Shootout	$436,568
2013	$10,000 No Limit Hold'em - Heads-Up	$336,190
