= 2025 World Series of Poker Europe =

Series of poker tournaments

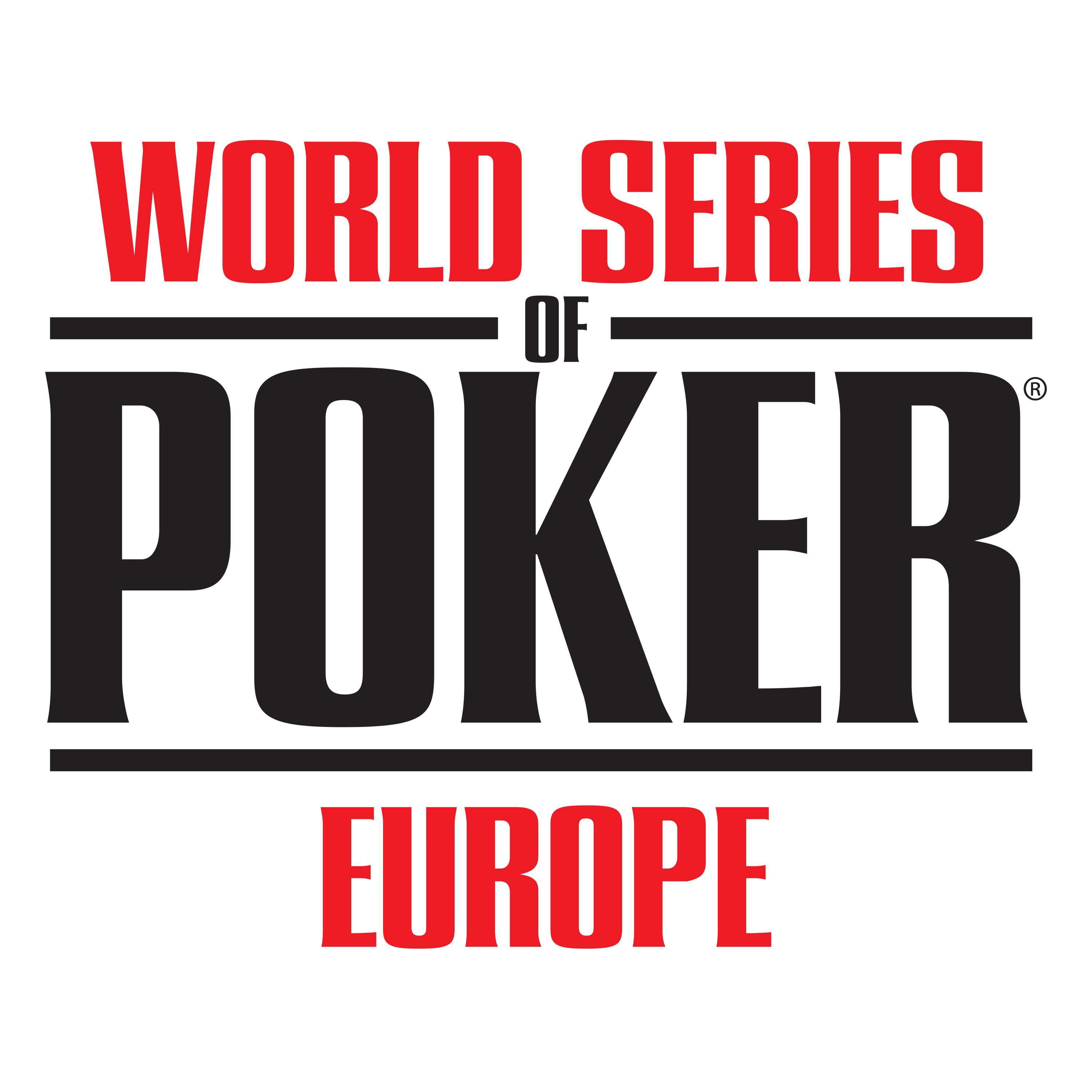
- Location: King's Resort, Rozvadov, Czech Republic
- Dates: September 17 - October 8

Champion
- (Germany) Daniel Pidun

The 2025 World Series of Poker Europe was the 16th edition of the World Series of Poker Europe, a series of poker tournaments. It is being held from September 17-October 8 at King's Resort in Rozvadov, Czech Republic. There are 15 WSOP bracelet events, culminating in the €10,350 No-Limit Hold'em Main Event beginning on October 3.

Martin Kabrhel won his fifth WSOP bracelet, and second of the year, in the €10,000 Pot-Limit Omaha Mystery Bounty event. Shaun Deeb also won his second bracelet of 2025 and became the ninth player in WSOP history with eight bracelets when he won the €25,000 No-Limit Hold'em GGMillion$. Tobias Peters and Darius Neagoe both won their second bracelets at the WSOP Europe.

This was the final WSOP Europe to be played in Rozvadov. The series will move to Prague in 2026.

== Event schedule ==
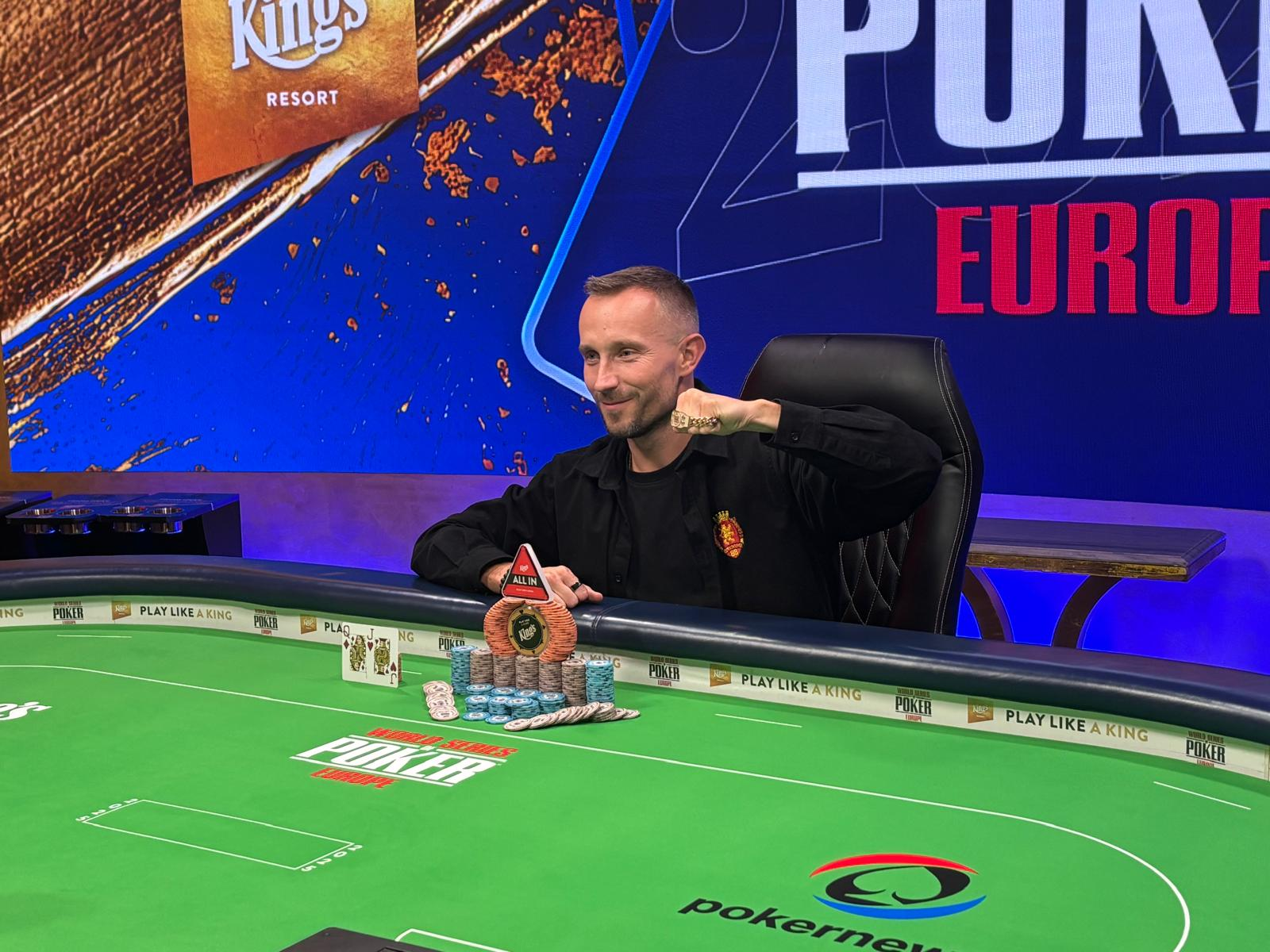
Event #1 champion Pawel Wojciechowski

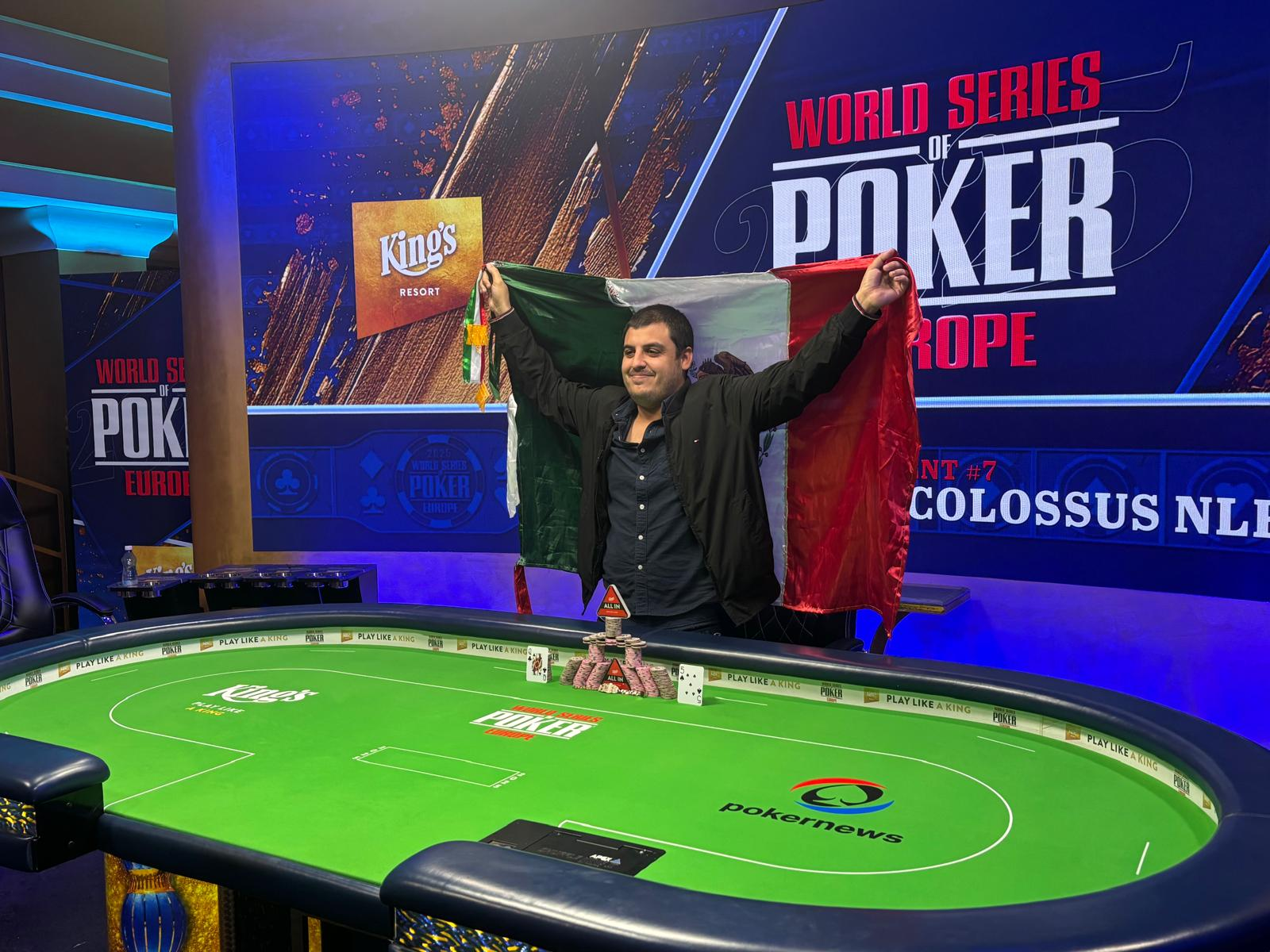
Event #7 champion Jose Gomez Casillas

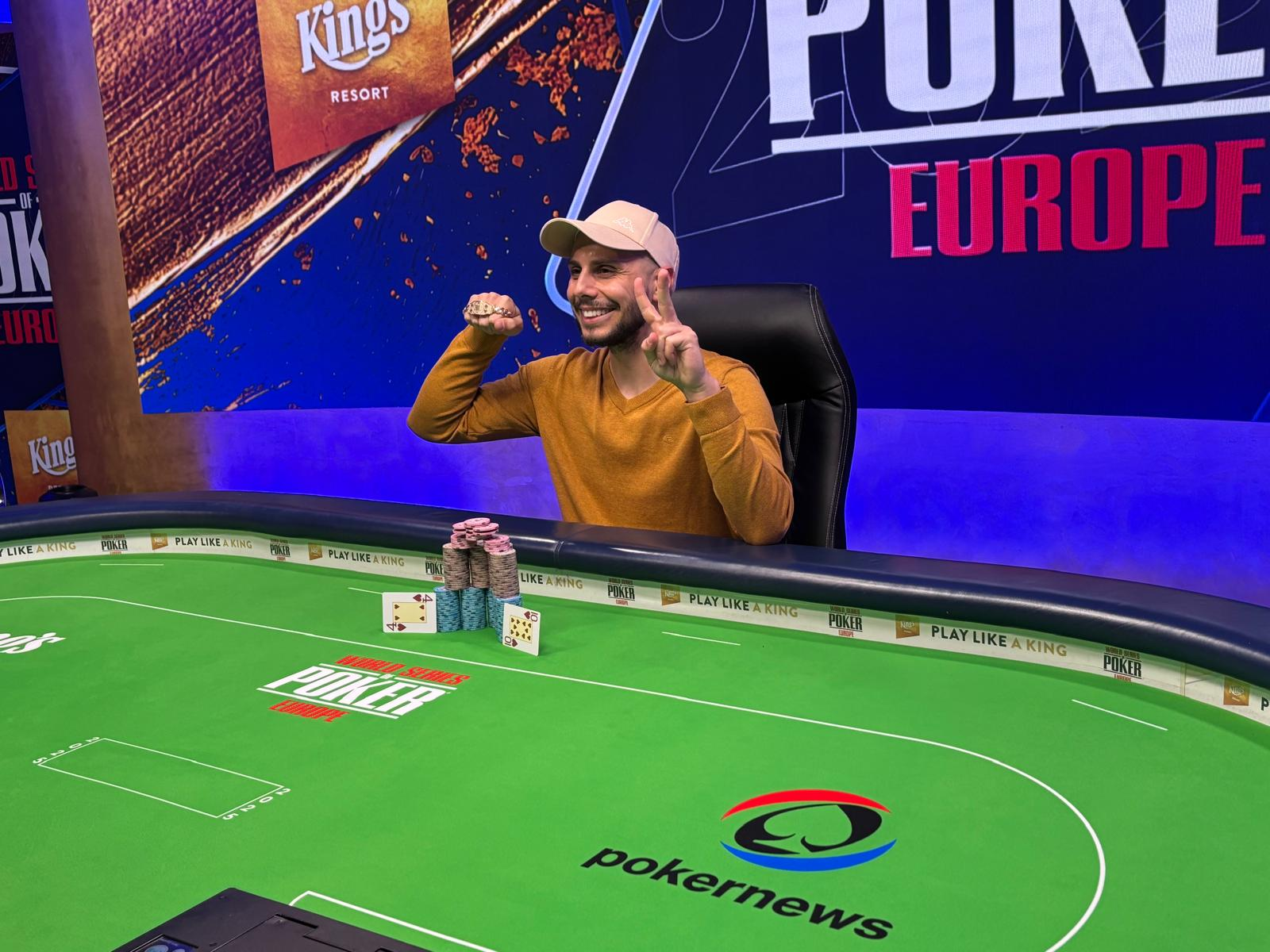
Darius Neagoe won his second bracelet in Event #12

#	Event	Entrants	Winner	Prize	Runner-up
1	€1,200 No-Limit Hold'em Bounty Hunter Opener	385	(Poland) Pawel Wojciechowski (1/1)	€58,850	(Slovakia) Jan Bendik
2	€350 No-Limit Hold'em King's Million	3,229	(Moldova) Stepan Budac (1/1)	€113,350	(Germany) Jan Kohl
3	€1,000 Pot-Limit Omaha	811	(Germany) Sascha Wilhelm (1/1)	€148,600	(Denmark) Daniel Bang-Ortmann
4	€2,000 No-Limit Hold'em Monsterstack	419	(Italy) Giuliano Bendinelli (1/1)	€169,850	(Czech Republic) Zdenek Zizka (1/1)
5	€1,350 Mini Main Event	1,293	(Sweden) Yuhan Wang (1/1)	€226,850	(Slovakia) Stanislav Koleno
6	€2,000 Pot-Limit Omaha	406	(Serbia) Dusan Despotovic (1/1)	€182,500	(Germany) Quirin Zech
7	€550 No-Limit Hold'em Colossus	2,765	(Mexico) Jose Gomez Casillas (1/1)	€158,350	(Italy) Claudio Daffina
8	€5,000 Pot-Limit Omaha	200	(China) Renji Mao (1/2)	€213,600	(Italy) Dario Alioto (0/1)
9	€3,000 No-Limit Hold'em 6-Max	309	(Netherlands) Tobias Peters (1/2)	€184,850	(Finland) Elias Vaaraniemi
10	€10,000 Pot-Limit Omaha Mystery Bounty	88	(Czech Republic) Martin Kabrhel (2/5)	€188,500	(United Kingdom) Robert Cowen (0/2)
11	€777 No-Limit Hold'em Lucky 7's	553	(Italy) Matteo Intiso (1/1)	€82,350	(Romania) Catalin Diac
12	€1,500 No-Limit Hold'em Mystery Million	692	(Romania) Darius Neagoe (1/2)	€100,350	(Germany) Rene Schnitzler
13	€25,000 No-Limit Hold'em GGMillion€	38	(United States) Shaun Deeb (2/8)	€329,000	(Brazil) Iago Savino
14	€10,350 No-Limit Hold'em Main Event	659	(Germany) Daniel Pidun (1/1)	€1,140,000	(Austria) Gerald Karlic
15	€1,000 No-Limit Hold'em Closer	645	(Czech Republic) Lukas Timko (1/1)	€158,000	(Czech Republic) Michal Schuh (0/1)

== Main Event ==
The €10,350 No-Limit Hold'em Main Event began on October 3 with the first of two starting flights. The final table was played on October 8.

There were 659 entries, generating a prize pool of €6,138,585. The top 99 players finished in the money, with the champion earning €1,140,000.

Daniel Pidun, a German amateur and past European Poker Tour champion, defeated Gerald Karlic heads-up with pocket aces versus two jacks.

=== Final Table ===
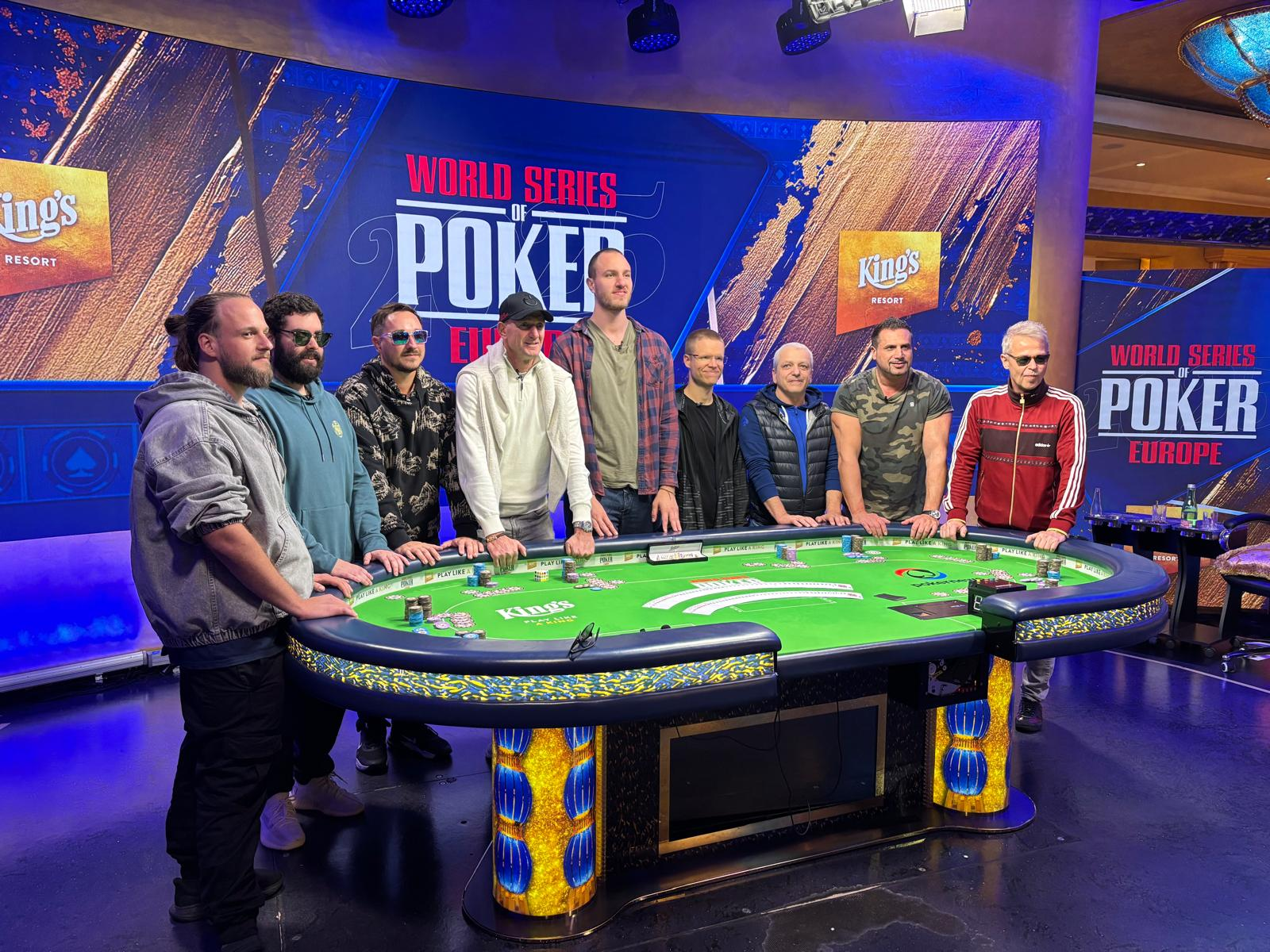
The 2025 WSOP Europe Main Event final table

Max Neugebauer, the 2023 champion, made the final table for the second time and finished in sixth place.

Name	Number of chips (percentage of total)	WSOP Bracelets	WSOP Cashes*	WSOP Earnings*
(Brazil) Murilo Garcia	13,400,000 (20.3%)	0	3	$5,729
(Austria) Max Neugebauer	11,025,000 (16.7%)	1	20	$1,894,923
(Italy) Claudio Di Giacomo	10,250,000 (15.5%)	0	12	$147,978
(Germany) Daniel Pidun	9,850,000 (14.9%)	0	3	$454,621
(Austria) Gerald Karlic	7,900,000 (12.0%)	0	9	$81,878
(Finland) Teemu Jaatinen	6,975,000 (10.6%)	0	0	0
(Romania) Catalin Pop	5,025,000 (7.6%)	0	11	$39,427
(Germany) Matthias Gude	1,500,000 (2.3%)	0	2	$53,002

*- career statistics before the 2025 Main Event

=== Final Table results ===
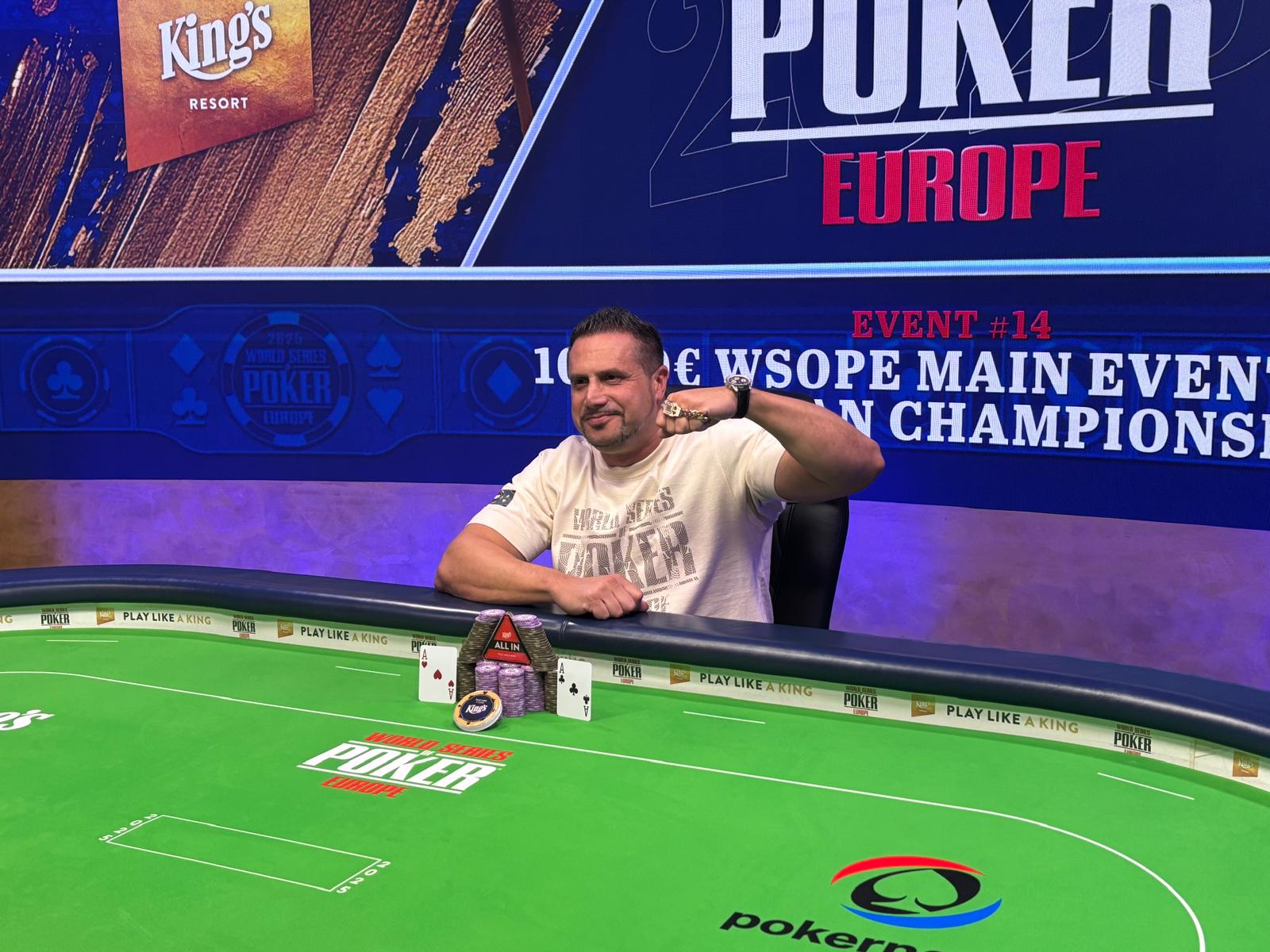
Daniel Pidun at the 2025 WSOP Europe Main Event

Place	Name	Prize
1	(Germany) Daniel Pidun	€1,140,000
2	(Austria) Gerald Karlic	€757,000
3	(Brazil) Murilo Garcia	€525,000
4	(Finland) Teemu Jaatinen	€370,000
5	(Italy) Claudio Di Giacomo	€265,000
6	(Austria) Max Neugebauer	€195,000
7	(Romania) Catalin Pop	€145,000
8	(Germany) Matthias Gude	€110,000
