= Annette Obrestad =

Norwegian poker player (born 1988)

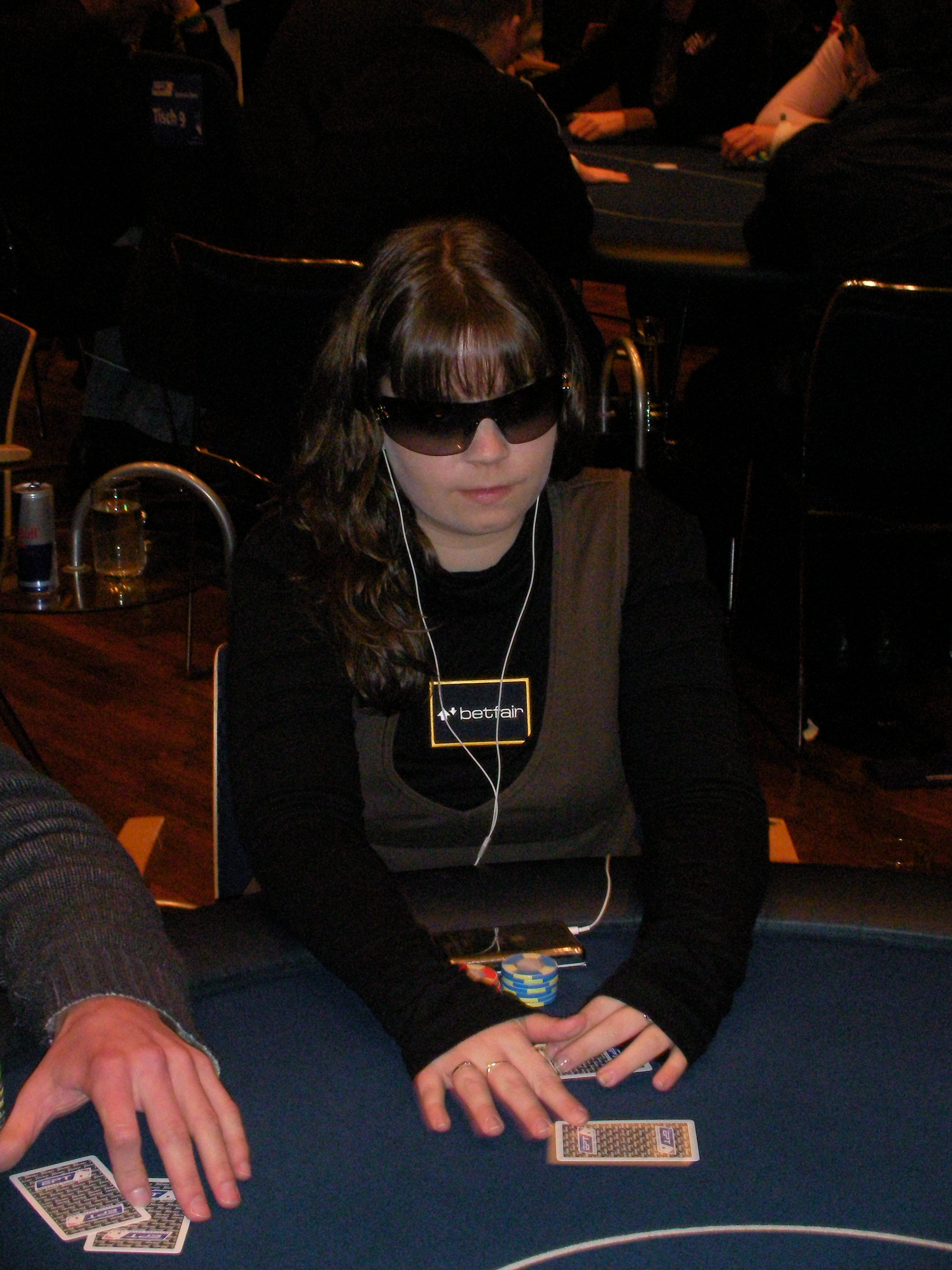
- Obrestad at the EPT German Open in Spielbank Hohensyburg, Dortmund
- Nickname: Annette_15, The Huntress
- Born: 18 September 1988 (age 38)

World Series of Poker
- Bracelet: 1
- Money finishes: 10
- Highest WSOP Main Event finish: 89th, 2013

European Poker Tour
- Title: None
- Final table: 1
- Money finishes: 3

Annette Obrestad (born 18 September 1988) is a Norwegian YouTuber, poker player, and Scrabble player. She is the youngest person to ever win a World Series of Poker bracelet, which she accomplished at the 2007 World Series of Poker Europe (WSOPE). She also runs a YouTube channel called Annette's Makeup Corner where she posts makeup tutorials and reviews, specializing in eyeshadow. She began playing in-person Scrabble tournaments in 2022 and has quickly risen to be one of the top 100 players in the North American lexicon.

== Poker ==
=== Online poker ===
In July 2007, Obrestad won a $4 buy-in 180 person online sit-and-go where she claims to have played almost the entire tournament without looking at her cards. She has said she peeked at her cards once during the tournament, when she was faced with an all-in bet. She did this to show "just how important it is to play position and to pay attention to the players at the table." On 2 March 2008 she won first place and $20,000 in the Stars Sunday Hundred Grand, a tournament with a buy-in of only $11 but with a field of 20,000 players.

=== World Series of Poker Europe ===
On 17 September 2007, Obrestad won the inaugural World Series of Poker Europe Main Event the day before her 19th birthday. By winning the one million-pound sterling (US$2.01 million at the time of the event) first prize she edged the record for a single-event payout to a female player set previously by poker professional Annie Duke when she won $2 million at the 2004 Tournament of Champions, which was an invitational event. Prior to the 2007 WSOPE, Obrestad had only cashed in four other live poker tournaments. Obrestad currently holds sixth place among Norwegian poker players in the all-time money list in live tournaments per the Hendon Mob Poker Database.

=== European Poker Tour ===
Obrestad came close to winning her second major live title in November 2007, finishing in second place earning €297,800 ($431,184) at the 2007 PokerStars.com European Poker Tour Dublin event to Reuben Peters, after holding the chip lead throughout most of the final table.

As of 2020, her total live tournament winnings exceeded $3.9 million.
