= James Bord =

English poker player and entrepreneur (born 1981)

- Nickname: Bordy
- Born: 1981 (age 44–45)

World Series of Poker
- Bracelet: 1
- Money finishes: 9

James Bord (born 1981), is an English entrepreneur and founder of shortcircuit.science, a company applying data science to medical prescription technology and climate adaption analysis. Born into a Jewish family in Stanmore, England, Bord now divides his time between London and the United States.

== Poker career ==
His biggest victory came in the 2010 World Series of Poker Europe Main Event, where he won $1,313,611 and became the first British champion of that event. He held pocket 10s against Fabrizio Baldassari's pocket 5s on the last hand to win the championship. A former banker for Citigroup, he left banking for poker in his mid-20s. Apart from that he has a lot cashes coming from the WSOP. Plus a second place in the Shootout - Invitational Aussie Millions Event, for more than $140,000.

Preferring high-stakes games to tournaments, Bord describes himself as a "mixed game cash player," usually playing high-low games. When in Las Vegas he plays in $300–600 or $400–800 games at the major poker venues. He has cashed in eight other WSOP events, the best being sixth in the 2008 no limit 2-7 lowball. As of April 2018, his lifetime live tournament winnings are $4,304,535.

== Football ==
On 23 September 2024, under his Short Circuit company, bought a minority stake in Spanish side Córdoba.

On 18 January 2025, Bord alongside Evan Sofer completed their takeover of Dunfermline Athletic acquiring 99.84% of the club.

On 24 December 2025, Bord was made the preferred bidder to take over EFL Championship club Sheffield Wednesday who were in administration. On the 25 February 2026, his consortium with Felix Romer and Abdullah Faisal Bin Jamil withdrew their bid to buy the club.

On 1 August 2026, Bord was confirmed as the biggest investor in Sparta Capital's purchase of FC Girondins de Bordeaux. On 21 August 2026, following the takeover, Bordeaux were stripped of their professional status and administratively relegated to the sixth tier of French football due to ongoing financial irregularities.
