= 2015 World Series of Poker results =

Below are the results of the 2015 World Series of Poker, held from May 27-July 14 at the Rio All Suite Hotel and Casino in Paradise, Nevada.

== Key ==
*	Elected to the Poker Hall of Fame
(#/#)	This denotes a bracelet winner. The first number is the number of bracelets won in the 2015 WSOP. The second number is the total number of bracelets won. Both numbers represent totals as of that point during the tournament.
Place	What place each player at the final table finished
Name	The player who made it to the final table
Prize (US$)	The amount of money awarded for each finish at the event's final table

== Results ==
=== Event #1: $565 Casino Employees No Limit Hold'em ===
- 2-Day Event: May 27–28
- Number of Entries: 688
- Total Prize Pool: $344,000
- Number of Payouts: 72
- Winning Hand: 8♦ 8♥

Final Table
Place	Name	Prize
1st	Brandon Barnette (1/1)	$75,704
2nd	Greg Seiden	$46,735
3rd	Zachary Seufert	$30,382
4th	Gary Kochalka	$22,315
5th	Michael Kahn	$16,622
6th	Aiping Xue	$12,542
7th	Thomas McFadden	$9,573
8th	Phi Tran	$7,389
9th	Chris Jones	$5,762

=== Event #2: $5,000 No Limit Hold'em ===
- 3-Day Event: May 27–29
- Number of Entries: 422
- Total Prize Pool: $1,983,400
- Number of Payouts: 45
- Winning Hand: J♥ 2♥

Final Table
Place	Name	Prize
1st	Michael Wang (1/1)	$466,120
2nd	Bryn Kenney (0/1)	$287,870
3rd	Artur Koren	$208,177
4th	Greg Merson (0/2)	$152,126
5th	Jason Wheeler	$112,339
6th	Amir Lehavot (0/1)	$83,838
7th	Joe Ebanks (0/1)	$63,210
8th	Long Nguyen	$48,137
9th	Byron Kaverman	$37,030

=== Event #3: $1,500 Omaha Hi-Lo 8 or Better ===
- 4-Day Event: May 28–31
- Number of Entries: 918
- Total Prize Pool: $1,239,300
- Number of Payouts: 117
- Winning Hand: A♠ 6♥ 5♥ 5♦

Final Table
Place	Name	Prize
1st	Robert Mizrachi (1/3)	$251,022
2nd	Jacob Dahl	$155,333
3rd	Don Zewin	$97,185
4th	Ryan Himes	$70,540
5th	Dominick Cuzzi	$52,075
6th	James Juvancic	$39,037
7th	Nguyen Tran	$29,693
8th	Bruce Levitt	$22,889
9th	Thomas Taylor	$17,883

=== Event #4: $3,000 No Limit Hold'em Shootout ===
- 3-Day Event: May 28–30
- Number of Entries: 308
- Total Prize Pool: $840,840
- Number of Payouts: 40
- Winning Hand: K♠ J♥

Final Table
Place	Name	Prize
1st	Nick Petrangelo (1/1)	$201,812
2nd	Jason Les	$124,696
3rd	David Peters	$91,575
4th	Jeffrey Griffiths	$67,788
5th	Derek Bowers	$50,576
6th	Andreas Hoivold	$38,039
7th	James Woods	$28,832
8th	Brian Lemke (0/1)	$22,021
9th	Leo Wolpert (0/1)	$16,951
10th	Loni Harwood (0/1)	$13,150

=== Event #5: $565 The Colossus No Limit Hold'em ===
- 6-Day Event: May 29-June 3
- Number of Entries: 22,374
- Total Prize Pool: $11,187,000
- Number of Payouts: 2,241
- Winning Hand: 4♠ 4♦

Final Table
Place	Name	Prize
1st	Cord Garcia (1/1)	$638,880
2nd	Bradley McFarland	$386,253
3rd	Ray Henson	$308,761
4th	Paul Lentz	$234,927
5th	Kenny Hallaert	$182,348
6th	Aditya Prasetyo	$140,956
7th	Garry Simms	$109,632
8th	David Farber	$87,817
9th	Anthony Blanda	$67,681

=== Event #6: $1,000 Hyper Hold'em ===
- 2-Day Event: May 31-June 1
- Number of Entries: 1,436
- Total Prize Pool: $1,292,400
- Number of Payouts: 144
- Winning Hand: A♣ 7♠

Final Table
Place	Name	Prize
1st	John Reading (1/1)	$252,068
2nd	Marc Macdonnell	$155,876
3rd	Harrison Beach	$98,623
4th	Aleksandr Gofman	$71,586
5th	Matthew Woodward	$52,807
6th	Robert Suer	$39,547
7th	Kenneth Johnson	$30,048
8th	Ryan Julius	$23,133
9th	Wayne Boyd	$18,041

=== Event #7: $10,000 Limit 2-7 Triple Draw Lowball Championship ===
- 3-Day Event: May 31-June 2
- Number of Entries: 109
- Total Prize Pool: $1,024,600
- Number of Payouts: 12
- Winning Hand: J♦ 8♣ 6♣ 5♥ 2♠

Final Table
Place	Name	Prize
1st	Tuan Le (1/2)	$322,756
2nd	Max Casal	$199,438
3rd	Ismael Bojang	$130,851
4th	Phil Galfond (0/1)	$89,939
5th	James Obst	$63,863
6th	Rep Porter (0/2)	$46,813

=== Event #8: $1,500 Pot Limit Hold'em ===
- 3-Day Event: June 1–3
- Number of Entries: 639
- Total Prize Pool: $862,650
- Number of Payouts: 72
- Winning Hand: 9♥ 9♦

Final Table
Place	Name	Prize
1st	Paul Michaelis (1/1)	$189,818
2nd	Tom Marchese	$117,199
3rd	Jesse Cohen	$76,189
4th	David Eldridge	$55,960
5th	Hillery Kerby	$41,683
6th	Michel Leibgorin	$31,452
7th	Kevin Andriamahefa	$24,007
8th	Georgios Sotiropoulos	$18,529
9th	William Mitchell	$14,449

=== Event #9: $1,500 Razz ===
- 3-Day Event: June 1–3
- Number of Entries: 462
- Total Prize Pool: $623,700
- Number of Payouts: 48
- Winning Hand: 3-6-K-2-7-Q-4

Final Table
Place	Name	Prize
1st	Max Pescatori (1/3)	$155,947
2nd	Ryan Miller	$96,349
3rd	Chris George	$61,247
4th	Matthew Smith	$44,164
5th	Eli Elezra (0/2)	$32,345
6th	Randy Kaas	$24,049
7th	Robin Lee	$18,149
8th	Matthew Mendez	$13,902

=== Event #10: $10,000 Heads Up No Limit Hold'em Championship ===
- 3-Day Event: June 2–4
- Number of Entries: 143
- Total Prize Pool: $1,344,200
- Number of Payouts: 16
- Winning Hand: Q♦ 8♠

Final Table
Place	Name	Prize
1st	Keith Lehr (1/2)	$334,430
2nd	Paul Volpe (0/1)	$206,620
SF	Dee Tiller	$111,525
SF	Matthew Cooper	$111,525
QF	Valeriu Coca	$54,545
QF	J.C. Tran (0/2)	$54,545
QF	Timothy Adams (0/1)	$54,545
QF	Isidro Sifuentes	$54,545

=== Event #11: $1,500 Limit Hold'em ===
- 3-Day Event: June 2–4
- Number of Entries: 660
- Total Prize Pool: $891,000
- Number of Payouts: 72
- Winning Hand: Q♥ J♦

Final Table
Place	Name	Prize
1st	William Kakon (1/1)	$196,055
2nd	Daniel Needleman	$121,051
3rd	Mike Lancaster	$78,693
4th	Bryan Pimlott	$57,799
5th	Shannon Shorr	$43,053
6th	Kevin Song (0/1)	$32,485
7th	Brandon Cantu (0/2)	$24,796
8th	Anthony Contreras	$19,138
9th	Alexander Kostritsyn	$14,924

=== Event #12: $1,500 No Limit Hold'em 6-Handed ===
- 3-Day Event: June 3–5
- Number of Entries: 1,651
- Total Prize Pool: $2,228,850
- Number of Payouts: 180
- Winning Hand: 6♦ 6♣

Final Table
Place	Name	Prize
1st	Idan Raviv (1/1)	$457,007
2nd	Iaron Lightbourne	$283,063
3rd	Manoel Filho	$186,108
4th	Markus Gonsalves	$122,586
5th	Craig McCorkell (0/1)	$82,467
6th	Mike Watson	$56,835

=== Event #13: $2,500 Omaha/Seven Card Stud Hi-Lo 8 or Better ===
- 4-Day Event: June 3–6
- Number of Entries: 474
- Total Prize Pool: $1,078,350
- Number of Payouts: 48
- Winning Hand: Q♦ 7♦ K♦ 6♦ 2♠ 2♦ 8♣

Final Table
Place	Name	Prize
1st	Konstantin Maslak (1/1)	$269,612
2nd	Hani Awad	$166,583
3rd	Benjamin Dobson	$105,893
4th	Viacheslav Zhukov (0/2)	$76,357
5th	Tuan Vo	$55,923
6th	Brandon Paster (0/1)	$41,581
7th	Chris Birchby	$31,379
8th	Jose Paz-Gutierrez	$24,036

=== Event #14: $1,500 No Limit Hold'em Shootout ===
- 3-Day Event: June 4–6
- Number of Entries: 1,000
- Total Prize Pool: $1,350,000
- Number of Payouts: 100
- Winning Hand: A♣ 6♣

Final Table
Place	Name	Prize
1st	Barry Hutter (1/1)	$283,546
2nd	Benjamin Zamani	$174,771
3rd	Dennis Phillips	$113,265
4th	Kitty Kuo	$82,890
5th	Elizabeth Montizanti	$61,560
6th	Orson Young	$46,332
7th	Anton Smirnov	$35,302
8th	Daniel Strelitz	$27,216
9th	Grayson Ramage	$21,208
10th	Randy Pfeifer	$16,740

=== Event #15: $10,000 Pot Limit Hold'em Championship ===
- 3-Day Event: June 4–6
- Number of Entries: 128
- Total Prize Pool: $1,203,200
- Number of Payouts: 18
- Winning Hand: A♦ 8♠

Final Table
Place	Name	Prize
1st	Shaun Deeb (1/1)	$318,857
2nd	Paul Volpe (0/1)	$197,048
3rd	Jason Les	$142,747
4th	Sam Stein (0/1)	$105,364
5th	Greg Merson (0/2)	$79,182
6th	Dario Sammartino	$60,545
7th	Kristijonas Andrulis	$47,081
8th	Ismael Bojang	$37,227
9th	Jason Koon	$29,911

=== Event #16: $1,500 Millionaire Maker No Limit Hold'em ===
- 5-Day Event: June 5–9
- Number of Entries: 7,275
- Total Prize Pool: $9,821,250
- Number of Payouts: 747
- Winning Hand: 10♣ 10♠

Final Table
Place	Name	Prize
1st	Adrian Buckley (1/1)	$1,277,193
2nd	Javier Zarco	$791,690
3rd	Olivier Busquet	$589,569
4th	Randy Pfeifer	$441,465
5th	Arshad Siddiqui	$333,038
6th	David Miscikowski (0/1)	$253,093
7th	Erick Lindgren (0/2)	$193,675
8th	Justin Pechie (0/1)	$149,283
9th	Mike Sexton* (0/1)	$115,890

=== Event #17: $10,000 Razz Championship ===
- 3-Day Event: June 6–8
- Number of Entries: 103
- Total Prize Pool: $968,200
- Number of Payouts: 16
- Winning Hand: 7-6-4-K-10-2-A

Final Table
Place	Name	Prize
1st	Phil Hellmuth* (1/14)	$271,105
2nd	Mike Gorodinsky (0/1)	$167,517
3rd	Adam Owen	$104,914
4th	Mike Leah (0/1)	$75,964
5th	Thomas Keller (0/1)	$59,370
6th	Jyri Merivirta	$47,344
7th	Stephen Chidwick	$38,447
8th	Brandon Shack-Harris (0/1)	$31,727

=== Event #18: $1,000 Turbo No Limit Hold'em ===
- 2-Day Event: June 7–8
- Number of Entries: 1,791
- Total Prize Pool: $1,611,900
- Number of Payouts: 198
- Winning Hand: 2♣ 2♥

Final Table
Place	Name	Prize
1st	John Gale (1/2)	$298,290
2nd	Gary Luther	$184,481
3rd	Matthew Vessier	$127,549
4th	Andrew Le	$91,991
5th	Stuart Rutter	$67,248
6th	Nitesh Rawtani	$49,807
7th	Mark Darner	$37,379
8th	Sean Rice	$28,417
9th	Tim Finne	$21,873

=== Event #19: $3,000 Limit Hold'em 6-Handed ===
- 3-Day Event: June 7–9
- Number of Entries: 319
- Total Prize Pool: $870,870
- Number of Payouts: 36
- Winning Hand: 6♦ 5♥

Final Table
Place	Name	Prize
1st	Matthew Elsby (1/1)	$230,799
2nd	Gabriel Nassif	$142,631
3rd	Dave Tobin	$92,582
4th	Joseph Thomas	$61,892
5th	Alexander Kuzmin	$42,515
6th	Harun Sapmaz	$29,975

=== Event #20: $1,500 No Limit Hold'em ===
- 4-Day Event: June 8–11
- Number of Entries: 1,844
- Total Prize Pool: $2,489,400
- Number of Payouts: 198
- Winning Hand: A♣ Q♦

Final Table
Place	Name	Prize
1st	Benjamin Zamani (1/1)	$460,640
2nd	Natasha Barbour	$284,911
3rd	Paul Ephremsen	$196,986
4th	Kevin MacPhee	$142,070
5th	Wenlong Jin	$103,857
6th	Garrett Beckman	$76,922
7th	Jared Griener	$57,729
8th	Oluwashola Akindele	$43,888
9th	Kevin Benoit	$33,781

=== Event #21: $10,000 Omaha Hi-Lo 8 or Better Championship ===
- 3-Day Event: June 8–10
- Number of Entries: 157
- Total Prize Pool: $1,475,800
- Number of Payouts: 18
- Winning Hand: Q♣ 8♦ 10♥ 10♦

Final Table
Place	Name	Prize
1st	Daniel Alaei (1/5)	$391,097
2nd	Kyle Miaso	$241,691
3rd	Jeffrey Vaughn	$175,088
4th	Scott Clements (0/2)	$129,235
5th	Ken Aldridge (0/1)	$97,122
6th	Anthony Zinno	$74,262
7th	Mike Wattel (0/1)	$57,748
8th	Tobias Hausen	$45,661
9th	Jeremy Ausmus (0/1)	$36,688

=== Event #22: $1,000 No Limit Hold'em ===
- 3-Day Event: June 9–11
- Number of Entries: 1,915
- Total Prize Pool: $1,723,500
- Number of Payouts: 198
- Winning Hand: J♦ 6♠

Final Table
Place	Name	Prize
1st	Sam Greenwood (1/1)	$318,977
2nd	Cole Jackson	$197,254
3rd	Ken Weinstein	$136,380
4th	James Dorrance	$98,360
5th	John Myung	$71,904
6th	Sean Rice	$53,256
7th	Aaron Belardo	$39,967
8th	Anthony Hsu	$30,385
9th	Jay Dragland	$23,387

=== Event #23: $1,500 No Limit 2-7 Draw Lowball ===
- 3-Day Event: June 9–11
- Number of Entries: 219
- Total Prize Pool: $295,650
- Number of Payouts: 28
- Winning Hand: J-8-6-3-2

Final Table
Place	Name	Prize
1st	Christian Pham (1/1)	$81,314
2nd	Daniel Ospina	$50,260
3rd	Matthew Smith	$33,163
4th	Andrey Zhigalov	$22,634
5th	Huck Seed (0/4)	$15,852
6th	Aleksandr Denisov	$11,385
7th	Mike Leah (0/1)	$8,381

=== Event #24: $1,500 H.O.R.S.E. ===
- 4-Day Event: June 10–13
- Number of Entries: 772
- Total Prize Pool: $1,042,200
- Number of Payouts: 80
- Winning Hand: K♦ Q♣ 3♥ 2♠ (Omaha 8)

Final Table
Place	Name	Prize
1st	Arash Ghaneian (1/1)	$239,750
2nd	Robert Campbell	$148,096
3rd	David Levi	$100,676
4th	Ronald Schiffman	$70,067
5th	Michael Trivett	$49,775
6th	Mike Watson	$36,080
7th	Jonathan Pineda	$26,669
8th	Jeffrey Mitseff	$20,093

=== Event #25: $5,000 No Limit Hold'em 8-Handed ===
- 4-Day Event: June 10–13
- Number of Entries: 493
- Total Prize Pool: $2,317,100
- Number of Payouts: 56
- Winning Hand: A♣ A♠

Final Table
Place	Name	Prize
1st	Jeff Tomlinson (1/1)	$567,724
2nd	Pierre Milan (0/1)	$350,994
3rd	Dominik Nitsche (0/3)	$220,657
4th	Jonathan Jaffe	$158,373
5th	Andrius Bielskis	$115,507
6th	Jonathan Little	$85,616
7th	Anthony Zinno	$64,484
8th	Dan O'Brien	$49,331

=== Event #26: $1,000 Pot Limit Omaha ===
- 3-Day Event: June 11–13
- Number of Entries: 1,293
- Total Prize Pool: $1,163,700
- Number of Payouts: 144
- Winning Hand: K♣ 9♦ 3♥ 3♦

Final Table
Place	Name	Prize
1st	Aaron Wallace (1/1)	$226,985
2nd	Marko Neumann	$140,353
3rd	Noah Merritt	$88,801
4th	Jeroen Choiner	$64,457
5th	Daniel Zack	$47,548
6th	Chase Steely	$35,609
7th	Balazs Somodi	$27,056
8th	Curtis Krushelniski	$20,830
9th	Thomas Kearney	$16,245

=== Event #27: $10,000 Seven Card Stud Championship ===
- 3-Day Event: June 11–13
- Number of Entries: 91
- Total Prize Pool: $855,400
- Number of Payouts: 16
- Winning Hand: 2♦ 5♦ J♦ 8♦ 9♦ 3♥ X

Final Table
Place	Name	Prize
1st	Brian Hastings (1/2)	$239,518
2nd	Scott Clements (0/2)	$148,001
3rd	Dan Kelly (0/2)	$92,691
4th	Chris George	$67,114
5th	Oxana Cummings	$52,453
6th	Harley Thrower	$41,829
7th	Mikhail Semin	$33,967
8th	Max Pescatori (1/3)	$28,031

=== Event #28: $1,500 Monster Stack No Limit Hold'em ===
- 6-Day Event: June 12–17
- Number of Entries: 7,192
- Total Prize Pool: $9,709,200
- Number of Payouts: 720
- Winning Hand: 6♥ 2♥

Final Table
Place	Name	Prize
1st	Perry Shiao (1/1)	$1,286,942
2nd	Eric Place	$796,834
3rd	Asi Moshe (0/1)	$594,397
4th	Kevin Kung	$445,166
5th	Christian Rodriguez	$335,938
6th	Joshua Wallace	$255,351
7th	Fernando Konishi	$195,543
8th	Caio Toledo	$150,783
9th	Hoyt Corkins (0/2)	$117,092

=== Event #29: $10,000 No Limit 2-7 Draw Lowball Championship ===
- 3-Day Event: June 13–15
- Number of Entries: 77
- Total Prize Pool: $723,800
- Number of Payouts: 14
- Winning Hand: 9-7-6-4-3

Final Table
Place	Name	Prize
1st	Phil Galfond (1/2)	$224,383
2nd	Nick Schulman (0/2)	$138,665
3rd	Dan Smith	$87,898
4th	Erik Seidel* (0/8)	$59,532
5th	Jon Turner	$42,298
6th	Eli Elezra (0/2)	$31,463
7th	Adam Owen	$24,457

=== Event #30: $1,000 No Limit Hold'em ===
- 4-Day Event: June 14–17
- Number of Entries: 2,150
- Total Prize Pool: $1,935,900
- Number of Payouts: 216
- Winning Hand: A♠ 10♠

Final Table
Place	Name	Prize
1st	Ivan Luca (1/1)	$353,391
2nd	Artur Rudziankov	$219,976
3rd	Travis Case	$152,907
4th	Pierre Horaud	$110,123
5th	Bruce Angeski	$80,485
6th	David Chase	$59,538
7th	Viliyan Petleshkov	$44,622
8th	Kai Yang	$33,868
9th	Omri Espo	$26,008

=== Event #31: $3,000 Pot Limit Omaha Hi-Lo 8 or Better ===
- 3-Day Event: June 14–16
- Number of Entries: 480
- Total Prize Pool: $1,310,400
- Number of Payouts: 54
- Winning Hand: A♠ 10♥ 9♣ 6♣

Final Table
Place	Name	Prize
1st	Jeff Madsen (1/4)	$301,413
2nd	Jean-Marc Thomas	$186,548
3rd	Rami Boukai (0/1)	$123,976
4th	Richard Tucker	$92,003
5th	Sun Kwak	$69,044
6th	John O'Shea	$52,324
7th	Huarong Ma	$40,006
8th	David Baker (0/1)	$30,833
9th	Spencer Chen	$23,941

=== Event #32: $5,000 No Limit Hold'em 6-Handed ===
- 3-Day Event: June 15–17
- Number of Entries: 550
- Total Prize Pool: $2,585,000
- Number of Payouts: 60
- Winning Hand: 6♠ 6♣

Final Table
Place	Name	Prize
1st	Jason Mercier (1/3)	$633,357
2nd	Simon Deadman	$391,446
3rd	Mike Gorodinsky (0/1)	$246,867
4th	Dario Sammartino	$163,604
5th	Igor Dubinskyy (0/1)	$111,672
6th	James Obst	$78,428

=== Event #33: $1,500 Limit 2-7 Triple Draw Lowball ===
- 3-Day Event: June 15–17
- Number of Entries: 388
- Total Prize Pool: $257,850
- Number of Payouts: 42
- Winning Hand: 9-7-6-4-2

Final Table
Place	Name	Prize
1st	Benny Glaser (1/1)	$136,215
2nd	Brock Parker (0/3)	$84,132
3rd	Noah Bronstein	$54,092
4th	Sergey Rybachenko	$35,869
5th	Andrew Brown (0/1)	$24,487
6th	Jon Turner	$17,201

=== Event #34: $1,500 Split Format Hold'em ===
- 4-Day Event: June 16–19
- Number of Entries: 873
- Total Prize Pool: $436,050
- Number of Payouts: 92
- Winning Hand: A♥ 3♦

Final Table
Place	Name	Prize
1st	Andre Boyer (1/2)	$250,483
2nd	Erwann Pecheux	$156,098
3rd	Andrew Gaw	$109,015
4th	Chris Bolek	$76,605
5th	Gavin O'Rourke	$55,981
6th	Jonas Christensen	$41,249
7th	Idan Raviv (1/1)	$30,053
8th	Isaac Kawa	$21,096

=== Event #35: $3,000 H.O.R.S.E. ===
- 4-Day Event: June 16–19
- Number of Entries: 376
- Total Prize Pool: $1,026,480
- Number of Payouts: 40
- Winning Hand: 6♣ 6♠ 9♦ Q♠ J♥ J♣ 3♦ (Seven Card Stud)

Final Table
Place	Name	Prize
1st	Daniel Idema (1/3)	$261,774
2nd	Matt Vengrin	$161,680
3rd	Kevin Iacofano	$104,280
4th	John Racener	$75,559
5th	Iakov Nepomnyashchiy	$55,553
6th	Paul Sexton	$41,438
7th	Randy Ohel (0/1)	$31,358
8th	Taylor Paur (0/1)	$24,070

=== Event #36: $1,500 Pot Limit Omaha ===
- 4-Day Event: June 17–20
- Number of Entries: 978
- Total Prize Pool: $1,320,300
- Number of Payouts: 117
- Winning Hand: Q♠ 10♥ 7♠ 3♦

Final Table
Place	Name	Prize
1st	Corrie Wunstel (1/1)	$266,874
2nd	Kevin Saul	$165,147
3rd	Jim Karambinis	$103,326
4th	Peter Levine	$74,997
5th	Matthew Colvin	$55,365
6th	Markus Cara	$41,504
7th	Bryce Fox	$31,569
8th	Kevin Allen	$24,336
9th	Kechao Ni	$19,012

=== Event #37: $10,000 No Limit Hold'em 6-Handed Championship ===
- 3-Day Event: June 17–19
- Number of Entries: 259
- Total Prize Pool: $2,434,600
- Number of Payouts: 30
- Winning Hand: A♠ 5♠

Final Table
Place	Name	Prize
1st	Byron Kaverman (1/1)	$657,351
2nd	Doug Polk (0/1)	$406,261
3rd	Fedor Holz	$268,463
4th	Thomas Muehloecker	$182,448
5th	Sam Greenwood (1/1)	$126,745
6th	Paul Volpe (0/1)	$89,934

=== Event #38: $3,000 No Limit Hold'em ===
- 4-Day Event: June 18–21
- Number of Entries: 989
- Total Prize Pool: $2,699,970
- Number of Payouts: 117
- Winning Hand: A♥ 9♦

Final Table
Place	Name	Prize
1st	Thiago Nishijima (1/1)	$546,843
2nd	Sotirios Koutoupas	$338,414
3rd	Jesse Sylvia	$211,731
4th	Sam Razavi	$153,682
5th	Yun Fan	$113,452
6th	Alexander Freund	$85,049
7th	Alex Keating	$64,691
8th	Duncan McCallum	$49,868
9th	Steve Brecher	$38,960

=== Event #39: $1,500 Ten-Game Mix ===
- 3-Day Event: June 18–20
- Number of Entries: 380
- Total Prize Pool: $513,000
- Number of Payouts: 42
- Winning Hand: K♦ 6♠ (Limit Hold'em)

Final Table
Place	Name	Prize
1st	Brian Hastings (2/3)	$133,403
2nd	Rostislav Tsodikov	$82,398
3rd	Todd Brunson (0/1)	$52,977
4th	Alexey Makarov	$35,130
5th	Tim Reusch	$23,982
6th	Mike Watson	$16,846

=== Event #40: $1,000 Seniors No Limit Hold'em Championship ===
- 4-Day Event: June 19–22
- Number of Entries: 4,193
- Total Prize Pool: $3,773,700
- Number of Payouts: 423
- Winning Hand: K♠ 10♠

Final Table
Place	Name	Prize
1st	Travis Baker (1/1)	$613,466
2nd	Carl Torelli	$378,766
3rd	Jim Hopperstead	$274,989
4th	Michael Smith	$202,157
5th	Justin Tseng	$149,929
6th	Lee Budin	$112,154
7th	Stephen Nussrallah	$84,644
8th	Steve Gee (0/1)	$64,417
9th	Shane Goldsmith	$49,435

=== Event #41: $10,000 Seven Card Stud Hi-Lo 8 or Better Championship ===
- 3-Day Event: June 19–21
- Number of Entries: 111
- Total Prize Pool: $1,043,400
- Number of Payouts: 16
- Winning Hand: K♠ 10♦ 10♣ 8♥ 5♠ 2♣ 10♥

Final Table
Place	Name	Prize
1st	Max Pescatori (2/4)	$292,158
2nd	Stephen Chidwick	$180,529
3rd	Daniel Negreanu* (0/6)	$113,062
4th	Aleksandr Denisov	$81,865
5th	Gary Benson (0/1)	$63,981
6th	Thomas Butzhammer	$51,022
7th	Richard Sklar	$41,433
8th	Alan Ledford	$34,192

=== Event #42: $1,500 Extended Play No Limit Hold'em ===
- 5-Day Event: June 20–24
- Number of Entries: 1,914
- Total Prize Pool: $2,583,900
- Number of Payouts: 198
- Winning Hand: A♦ 10♥

Final Table
Place	Name	Prize
1st	Adrian Apmann (1/1)	$478,102
2nd	Yehoram Houri	$295,727
3rd	Barny Boatman (0/1)	$204,464
4th	Anthony Diotte	$147,463
5th	D.J. Buckley	$107,800
6th	Kurt Lichtman	$79,842
7th	Konstantin Puchkov (0/1)	$59,920
8th	Artem Metalidi	$45,554
9th	Ross Gottlieb	$35,063

=== Event #43: $1,000 Super Seniors No Limit Hold'em ===
- 3-Day Event: June 21–23
- Number of Entries: 1,533
- Total Prize Pool: $1,379,700
- Number of Payouts: 171
- Winning Hand: 7♥ 3♣

Final Table
Place	Name	Prize
1st	Jon Andlovec (1/1)	$262,220
2nd	Rod Pardey (0/2)	$162,100
3rd	Charles Havens	$106,678
4th	Wayne Knyal	$76,904
5th	Thomas Lock	$56,291
6th	Mark Estes	$41,804
7th	Ted Cohen	$31,484
8th	Perry Green (0/3)	$24,034
9th	Mark Schwartz	$18,584

=== Event #44: $50,000 The Poker Players Championship ===
- 5-Day Event: June 21–25
- Number of Entries: 84
- Total Prize Pool: $4,032,000
- Number of Payouts: 12
- Winning Hand: 10♣ 8♣ 8♥ 3♥ (Pot Limit Omaha)

Final Table
Place	Name	Prize
1st	Mike Gorodinsky (1/2)	$1,270,086
2nd	Jean-Robert Bellande	$784,828
3rd	David Baker (0/1)	$514,926
4th	Ben Sulsky	$353,928
5th	Chris Klodnicki	$251,314
6th	Dan Kelly (0/2)	$184,222

=== Event #45: $1,500 No Limit Hold'em ===
- 4-Day Event: June 22–25
- Number of Entries: 1,655
- Total Prize Pool: $2,234,250
- Number of Payouts: 171
- Winning Hand: A♠ K♥

Final Table
Place	Name	Prize
1st	Upeshka DeSilva (1/1)	$424,577
2nd	Dara O'Kearney	$262,502
3rd	John Dolan	$172,752
4th	Patrick Rojek	$124,537
5th	Ilkin Amirov	$91,157
6th	Bobby Moore	$67,697
7th	Jorden Fox	$50,985
8th	Vasily Tsapko	$38,920
9th	Jason Koon	$30,095

=== Event #46: $3,000 Pot Limit Omaha 6-Handed ===
- 4-Day Event: June 22–25
- Number of Entries: 682
- Total Prize Pool: $1,861,860
- Number of Payouts: 78
- Winning Hand: J♣ J♥ 8♣ 9♦

Final Table
Place	Name	Prize
1st	Vasili Firsau (1/1)	$437,575
2nd	Nipun Java	$270,509
3rd	Andreas Freund	$171,626
4th	Numit Agrawal	$112,717
5th	Vadzim Markushevski	$76,373
6th	Daniel Idema (1/3)	$53,342

=== Event #47: $2,500 No Limit Hold'em ===
- 4-Day Event: June 23–26
- Number of Entries: 1,244
- Total Prize Pool: $2,830,100
- Number of Payouts: 144
- Winning Hand: Q♠ J♥

Final Table
Place	Name	Prize
1st	Matt O'Donnell (1/1)	$551,941
2nd	Timur Margolin	$341,338
3rd	Brandon Wittmeyer	$215,964
4th	Andy Black	$156,759
5th	Andrew Dean	$115,637
6th	Jeff Gross	$86,601
7th	Rick Alvarado	$65,799
8th	Andre Akkari (0/1)	$50,658
9th	Raghav Bansal	$39,508

=== Event #48: $1,500 Seven Card Stud ===
- 3-Day Event: June 23–25
- Number of Entries: 327
- Total Prize Pool: $441,450
- Number of Payouts: 40
- Winning Hand: 6♣ K♥ 5♠ 4♣ 6♠ 7♥ 8♠

Final Table
Place	Name	Prize
1st	Eli Elezra (1/3)	$112,591
2nd	Benjamin Lazer	$69,532
3rd	Allen Cunningham (0/5)	$44,846
4th	Gylbert Drolet	$32,495
5th	Kenn Wittock	$23,891
6th	Byron Ziebell	$17,821
7th	Jean Gaspard	$13,486
8th	Matt Grapenthien (0/1)	$10,352

=== Event #49: $1,500 Pot Limit Omaha Hi-Lo 8 or Better ===
- 3-Day Event: June 24–26
- Number of Entries: 815
- Total Prize Pool: $1,100,250
- Number of Payouts: 90
- Winning Hand: A♣ 4♠ 10♦ 7♦

Final Table
Place	Name	Prize
1st	Young Ji (1/1)	$231,102
2nd	Mark Dube	$142,449
3rd	Alex Dovzhenko	$92,310
4th	Connor Drinan	$67,555
5th	Bryce Yockey	$50,171
6th	Nick Polydoros	$37,760
7th	Prince of Docness	$28,771
8th	George Danzer (0/3)	$22,181
9th	Joseph Haddad	$17,284

=== Event #50: $10,000 Limit Hold'em Championship ===
- 3-Day Event: June 24–26
- Number of Entries: 117
- Total Prize Pool: $1,099,800
- Number of Payouts: 18
- Winning Hand: A♦ J♦

Final Table
Place	Name	Prize
1st	Ben Yu (1/1)	$291,456
2nd	Jesse Martin (0/1)	$180,114
3rd	Justin Bonomo (0/1)	$130,480
4th	Aleksandr Denisov	$96,309
5th	Anthony Zinno	$72,377
6th	Kenny Shei	$55,341
7th	Gabriel Nassif	$43,035
8th	Marco Johnson (0/1)	$34,027
9th	Terrence Chan	$27,341

=== Event #51: $3,000 No Limit Hold'em 6-Handed ===
- 4-Day Event: June 25–28
- Number of Entries: 1,043
- Total Prize Pool: $2,847,390
- Number of Payouts: 108
- Winning Hand: K♣ Q♣

Final Table
Place	Name	Prize
1st	Justin Liberto (1/1)	$640,711
2nd	Seamus Cahill	$395,986
3rd	Kiryl Radzivonau	$251,168
4th	Alexander Debus	$164,863
5th	Cornel Cimpan	$111,475
6th	Benjamin Heath	$77,591

=== Event #52: $1,500 Dealers Choice ===
- 3-Day Event: June 25–27
- Number of Entries: 357
- Total Prize Pool: $481,950
- Number of Payouts: 36
- Winning Hand: K♠ J♥ (Hold'em)

Final Table
Place	Name	Prize
1st	Carol Fuchs (1/1)	$127,735
2nd	Ilya Krupin	$78,933
3rd	Robert Mizrachi (1/3)	$51,236
4th	Chris Klodnicki	$34,252
5th	Yuval Bronshtein	$23,528
6th	Viktor Celikovsky	$16,588

=== Event #53: $10,000/$1,000 Ladies No Limit Hold'em Championship ===
- 3-Day Event: June 26–28
- Number of Entries: 795
- Total Prize Pool: $715,500
- Number of Payouts: 81
- Winning Hand: K♥ Q♠

Final Table
Place	Name	Prize
1st	Jacquelyn Scott (1/1)	$153,876
2nd	Hope Williams	$95,039
3rd	Amanda Sizemore	$61,268
4th	Li Fu	$44,883
5th	Parm Mehmi	$33,363
6th	Liya Gerasimova	$25,135
7th	Stacie Boehm	$19,168
8th	Stephanie Ampelikiotis	$14,789
9th	Sandie Morse	$11,533

=== Event #54: $10,000 Pot Limit Omaha Championship ===
- 3-Day Event: June 26–28
- Number of Entries: 387
- Total Prize Pool: $3,637,800
- Number of Payouts: 40
- Winning Hand: A♠ K♦ J♣ 2♠

Final Table
Place	Name	Prize
1st	Alexander Petersen (1/1)	$927,655
2nd	Jason Mercier (1/3)	$572,989
3rd	Dan Smith	$369,564
4th	Simon Trumper	$267,778
5th	Mohsin Virani	$196,877
6th	Sven Reichardt	$146,857
7th	Davidi Kitai (0/3)	$111,134
8th	Shaun Deeb (1/1)	$85,306

=== Event #55: $1,500 Draftkings 50/50 No Limit Hold'em ===
- 3-Day Event: June 27–29
- Number of Entries: 1,123
- Total Prize Pool: $1,516,050
- Number of Payouts: 562
- Winning Hand: A♥ Q♥

Final Table
Place	Name	Prize
1st	Brandon Wittmeyer (1/1)	$200,618
2nd	Derek Gomez	$123,907
3rd	Ping Liu	$77,516
4th	Mukul Pahuja	$56,245
5th	Tom Braband	$41,540
6th	Matt Affleck	$31,079
7th	Muhamet Perati	$23,650
8th	Stefano Terziani	$18,268
9th	Michael Whitman	$14,266

=== Event #56: $5,000 Turbo No Limit Hold'em ===
- 2-Day Event: June 27–28
- Number of Entries: 454
- Total Prize Pool: $2,133,800
- Number of Payouts: 54
- Winning Hand: A♥ 4♦

Final Table
Place	Name	Prize
1st	Kevin MacPhee (1/1)	$490,800
2nd	Igor Yaroshevskyy	$303,767
3rd	Pascal Theodosiadis	$201,878
4th	Eric Sfez	$149,814
5th	Scott Vener	$112,429
6th	Tristan Wade (0/1)	$85,202
7th	Hung Tran	$65,144
8th	Joshua Field	$50,208
9th	Martin Kozlov	$38,984

=== Event #57: $1,000 No Limit Hold'em ===
- 4-Day Event: June 28-July 1
- Number of Entries: 2,497
- Total Prize Pool: $2,247,300
- Number of Payouts: 270
- Winning Hand: Q♠ 7♥

Final Table
Place	Name	Prize
1st	Takahiro Nakai (1/1)	$399,039
2nd	Mel Wiener (0/1)	$248,034
3rd	Paul Vas Nunes	$175,559
4th	Glenn Lafaye	$126,612
5th	Jonas Lauck	$92,453
6th	Robert Piltz	$68,317
7th	David Martinez Cano	$51,103
8th	Frederico Dabus	$38,676
9th	Barry Schultz	$29,619

=== Event #58: $111,111 High Roller for One Drop ===
- 2-Day Event: June 28–29
- Number of Entries: 135
- Total Prize Pool: $14,249,925
- Number of Payouts: 16
- Winning Hand: K♣ K♠

Final Table
Place	Name	Prize
1st	Jonathan Duhamel (1/2)	$3,989,985
2nd	Bill Klein	$2,465,522
3rd	Daniel Colman (0/1)	$1,544,121
4th	Ben Sulsky	$1,118,049
5th	Dan Perper	$873,805
6th	Phil Hellmuth* (1/14)	$696,821
7th	Anthony Zinno	$565,864
8th	Sergey Lebedev	$466,970

=== Event #59: $1,500 No Limit Hold'em ===
- 4-Day Event: June 29-July 2
- Number of Entries: 2,155
- Total Prize Pool: $2,909,250
- Number of Payouts: 216
- Winning Hand: 4♦ 3♣

Final Table
Place	Name	Prize
1st	Alex Lindop (1/1)	$531,037
2nd	Aurelien Guiglini	$330,578
3rd	Yorane Kerignard	$229,787
4th	Haixia Zhang (0/1)	$165,492
5th	Jamie Gold (0/1)	$120,952
6th	Luis Freitas	$89,473
7th	Jason Herron	$67,058
8th	Joshua Evans	$50,897
9th	Rick Alvarado	$39,085

=== Event #60: $25,000 High Roller Pot Limit Omaha ===
- 4-Day Event: June 29-July 2
- Number of Entries: 175
- Total Prize Pool: $4,156,250
- Number of Payouts: 24
- Winning Hand: A♣ A♥ Q♠ 10♦

Final Table
Place	Name	Prize
1st	Anthony Zinno (1/1)	$1,122,196
2nd	Pakinai Lisawad	$693,553
3rd	Stian Usterud	$456,522
4th	Christian Harder	$332,998
5th	Juha Helppi	$247,754
6th	Ismael Bojang	$187,571
7th	Alexander Kostritsyn	$144,305
8th	Shaun Deeb (1/1)	$112,675

=== Event #61: $1,111 The Little One for One Drop ===
- 4-Day Event: June 30-July 3
- Number of Entries: 4,555
- Total Prize Pool: $4,099,500
- Number of Payouts: 468
- Winning Hand: K♥ Q♠

Final Table
Place	Name	Prize
1st	Paul Hoefer (1/1)	$645,969
2nd	Mario Lopez	$399,455
3rd	Senovio Ramirez	$287,620
4th	John Reading (1/1)	$212,559
5th	Carlos Chang	$158,404
6th	Dustin Lee	$119,049
7th	Rainer Kempe	$90,189
8th	Jason Caulk	$68,912
9th	Brett Shaffer (0/2)	$53,088

=== Event #62: $1,500 Bounty No Limit Hold'em ===
- 4-Day Event: July 1–4
- Number of Entries: 2,178
- Total Prize Pool: $2,940,300
- Number of Payouts: 243
- Winning Hand: K♥ K♣

Final Table
Place	Name	Prize
1st	Jack Duong (1/1)	$333,351
2nd	Vitezslav Pesta	$206,734
3rd	Adam Johnson	$146,067
4th	Scott Sisler	$105,024
5th	Paul Warren	$76,514
6th	R.J. Sullivan	$56,483
7th	Vojtech Ruzicka	$42,228
8th	John Myung	$31,971
9th	Peter Murphy	$24,511

=== Event #63: $10,000 H.O.R.S.E. Championship ===
- 3-Day Event: July 1–3
- Number of Entries: 204
- Total Prize Pool: $1,917,000
- Number of Payouts: 24
- Winning Hand: A♦ 4♥ 7♠ Q♣ 6♣ 5♦ 2♦ (Seven Card Stud Hi-Lo)

Final Table
Place	Name	Prize
1st	Andrew Barber (1/1)	$517,766
2nd	Viacheslav Zhukov (0/2)	$319,989
3rd	Don Zewin	$210,629
4th	Jared Bleznick	$153,638
5th	Joe Hachem (0/1)	$114,308
6th	Frank Kassela (0/2)	$86,541
7th	Scotty Nguyen* (0/5)	$66,579
8th	Arash Ghaneian (1/1)	$51,986

=== Event #64: $1,000 WSOP.com Online No Limit Hold'em ===
- 2-Day Event: July 2–4
- Number of Entries: 905
- Total Prize Pool: $859,750
- Number of Payouts: 100
- Winning Hand: J♠ 7♥

Final Table
Place	Name	Prize
1st	Anthony Spinella (1/1)	$197,743
2nd	Hunter Cichy	$116,066
3rd	Craig Varnell	$73,079
4th	Andrew Rose	$55,884
5th	David Tuthill	$47,286
6th	Ryan Franklin	$33,530

=== Event #65: $1,500 Seven Card Stud Hi-Lo 8 or Better ===
- 4-Day Event: July 2–5
- Number of Entries: 547
- Total Prize Pool: $738,450
- Number of Payouts: 56
- Winning Hand: A♠ J♠ J♣ 6♣ 5♥ J♦ 7♠

Final Table
Place	Name	Prize
1st	Gerald Ringe (1/1)	$180,943
2nd	Christopher Vitch	$111,860
3rd	Daniel Idema (1/3)	$70,322
4th	Noah Bronstein	$50,473
5th	John Esposito (0/1)	$36,811
6th	Owais Ahmed (0/1)	$27,285
7th	John Cover	$20,551
8th	Chris George	$15,721

=== Event #66: $777 Lucky Sevens No Limit Hold'em ===
- 4-Day Event: July 3–6
- Number of Entries: 4,422
- Total Prize Pool: $3,095,400
- Number of Payouts: 468
- Winning Hand: 10♠ 9♥

Final Table
Place	Name	Prize
1st	Connor Berkowitz (1/1)	$487,784
2nd	John Armbrust	$301,615
3rd	David Yu	$217,173
4th	Jeffrey Dobrin	$160,496
5th	Faraz Jaka	$119,606
6th	John Gallaher	$89,890
7th	John Zimmerman	$68,098
8th	Matt Matros (0/3)	$52,033
9th	Massimo Mosele	$40,085

=== Event #67: $10,000 Dealers Choice Championship ===
- 3-Day Event: July 3–5
- Number of Entries: 108
- Total Prize Pool: $1,015,200
- Number of Payouts: 12
- Winning Hand: 8-7-6-3-2 (2-7 Triple Draw)

Final Table
Place	Name	Prize
1st	Quinn Do (1/2)	$319,792
2nd	Rep Porter (0/2)	$197,608
3rd	Jeff Madsen (1/4)	$129,651
4th	Jake Abdalla	$89,114
5th	Adam Friedman (0/1)	$63,277
6th	Jussi Nevanlinna	$46,384

=== Event #68: $10,000 No Limit Hold'em Main Event ===
- 10-Day Event: July 5–14
- Final Table: November 8–10
- Number of Entries: 6,420
- Total Prize Pool: $60,348,000
- Number of Payouts: 1,000
- Winning Hand: A♥ 10♦

Final Table
Place	Name	Prize
1st	Joe McKeehen (1/1)	$7,683,346
2nd	Joshua Beckley	$4,470,896
3rd	Neil Blumenfield	$3,398,298
4th	Max Steinberg (0/1)	$2,615,361
5th	Ofer Zvi Stern	$1,911,423
6th	Thomas Cannuli	$1,426,283
7th	Pierre Neuville	$1,203,293
8th	Federico Butteroni	$1,097,056
9th	Patrick Chan	$1,001,020
