= 2015 World Series of Poker Europe results =

Below are the results for the 2015 World Series of Poker Europe, held from October 8-24 at the Spielbank Casino in Berlin, Germany.

== Key ==
*	Elected to the Poker Hall of Fame
(#/#)	This denotes a bracelet winner. The first number is the number of bracelets won in 2015. The second number is the total number of bracelets won. Both numbers represent totals as of that point during the tournament.
Place	What place each player finished
Name	The player who made it to the final table
Prize (€)	The amount of money, in Euros (€), awarded for each finish at the event's final table

== Results ==
=== Event 1: €2,200 Six Handed No Limit Hold'em ===
- 3-Day Event: October 8-10
- Number of buy-ins: 197
- Total Prize Pool: €382,180
- Number of Payouts: 21
- Winning Hand: A♥ 6♣

Final Table
Place	Name	Prize
1st	Makarios Avramidis (1/1)	€105,000
2nd	Frederic Schwarzer	€64,930
3rd	Paul Michaelis (1/1)	€45,860
4th	Stephen Chidwick	€32,600
5th	Rick Alvarado	€23,310
6th	Marvin Rettenmaier	€16,740

=== Event 2: €550 The Oktoberfest No Limit Hold'em ===
- 5-Day Event: October 9-13
- Number of buy-ins: 2,144
- Total Prize Pool: €1,039,840
- Number of Payouts: 173
- Winning Hand: A♠ J♣

Final Table
Place	Name	Prize
1st	Dietrich Fast (1/1)	€157,749
2nd	John Gale (1/2)	€97,804
3rd	Rodrigo Caprioli	€73,699
4th	Vojtech Cervinka	€56,278
5th	Steve O'Dwyer	€43,409
6th	Adrian Apmann (1/1)	€33,808
7th	Sandro Wuest	€26,587
8th	Jorn Winter	€21,115
9th	Harry Lodge	€16,935

=== Event 3: €3,250 Eight Handed Pot Limit Omaha ===
- 3-Day Event: October 11-13
- Number of buy-ins: 161
- Total Prize Pool: €468,510
- Number of Payouts: 20
- Winning Hand: A♣ J♥ 10♦ 2♦

Final Table
Place	Name	Prize
1st	Richard Gryko (1/1)	€126,345
2nd	Mike Leah (0/1)	€78,150
3rd	Mikkel Plum	€55,755
4th	Roberto Romanello	€40,480
5th	Lawrence Lazar	€29,940
6th	Benjamin Pollak	€22,535
7th	Max Pescatori (2/4)	€17,240
8th	Ismael Bojang	€13,445

=== Event 4: €1,650 Monster Stack No Limit Hold'em ===
- 3-Day Event: October 12-14
- Number of buy-ins: 580
- Total Prize Pool: €843,900
- Number of Payouts: 63
- Winning Hand: 8♠ 7♣

Final Table
Place	Name	Prize
1st	Ryan Hefter (1/1)	€176,205
2nd	Gilbert Diaz	€109,625
3rd	Carlos Chang	€80,170
4th	Henrik Hecklen	€59,495
5th	Diego Ventura	€44,725
6th	Armin Eckl	€34,180
7th	Justin Frolian	€26,415
8th	Richard Sheils	€20,675
9th	David Peters	€16,455

=== Event 5: €2,200 Mixed Event ===
- 3-Day Event: October 13-15
- Number of buy-ins: 113
- Total Prize Pool: €219,220
- Number of Payouts: 12
- Winning Hand: A♣ Q♠ 9♣ 5♠ (Pot Limit Omaha)

Final Table
Place	Name	Prize
1st	Alex Komaromi (1/1)	€65,740
2nd	Scott Clements (0/2)	€40,645
3rd	Noah Bronstein	€29,200
4th	Jonathan Duhamel (1/2)	€21,065
5th	Shaun Deeb (1/1)	€15,235
6th	Jens Lakemeier	€11,025

=== Event 6: €3,250 No Limit Hold'em ===
- 3-Day Event: October 14-16
- Number of buy-ins: 256
- Total Prize Pool: €744,960
- Number of Payouts: 27
- Winning Hand: A♥ 9♦

Final Table
Place	Name	Prize
1st	Pavlos Xanthopoulos (1/1)	€182,510
2nd	Mario Lopez	€112,785
3rd	Thierry Gogniat	€81,500
4th	Sam Chartier	€59,970
5th	Farid Jattin	€44,920
6th	Alex Rocha	€34,270
7th	Fabrice Soulier (0/1)	€26,520
8th	Artan Dedusha	€20,860
9th	Sergi Reixach	€16,685

=== Event 7: €550 Pot Limit Omaha ===
- 3-Day Event: October 15-17
- Number of buy-ins: 503
- Total Prize Pool: €243,955
- Number of Payouts: 56
- Winning Hand: Q♥ J♥ 10♦ 6♦

Final Table
Place	Name	Prize
1st	Barny Boatman (1/2)	€54,725
2nd	Grzegorz Grochulski	€33,910
3rd	Shannon Shorr	€24,520
4th	Jose Obadia	€18,000
5th	Doug Lee	€13,320
6th	Dominik Maska	€9,980
7th	Pawel Bakiewicz	€7,560
8th	Damian Pawlak	€5,780

=== Event 8: €1,100 Turbo No Limit Hold'em Re-Entry ===
- 3-Day Event: October 16-18
- Number of buy-ins: 546
- Total Prize Pool: €546,000
- Number of Payouts: 46
- Winning Hand: K♣ Q♠

Final Table
Place	Name	Prize
1st	Georgios Sotiropoulos (1/1)	€112,133
2nd	Paul Tedeschi	€69,361
3rd	Benjamin Zamani (1/1)	€50,719
4th	Andre Lommel	€37,636
5th	Rafal Tomczak	€28,318
6th	John Racener	€21,600
7th	Brian Hastings (2/3)	€16,703
8th	Byron Kaverman (1/1)	€13,094
9th	Asher Conniff	€10,402

=== Event 9: €10,450 No Limit Hold'em Main Event ===
- 7-Day Event: October 18-24
- Number of buy-ins: 313
- Total Prize Pool: €3,067,400
- Number of Payouts: 32
- Winning Hand: A♦ 4♦

Final Table
Place	Name	Prize
1st	Kevin MacPhee (2/2)	€883,000
2nd	David Lopez	€475,000
3rd	J.C. Alvarado	€315,000
4th	Andrew Lichtenberger	€225,000
5th	Kilian Kramer	€175,000
6th	Felix Bleiker	€130,000
7th	Erik Seidel* (0/8)	€100,000
8th	Mario Sanchez	€75,000

=== Event 10: €25,600 High Roller No Limit Hold'em ===
- 3-Day Event: October 21-23
- Number of buy-ins: 64
- Total Prize Pool: €1,584,000
- Number of Payouts: 7
- Winning Hand: 7♣ 7♥

Final Table
Place	Name	Prize
1st	Jonathan Duhamel (2/3)	€554,395
2nd	Davidi Kitai (0/3)	€342,620
3rd	Mustapha Kanit	€227,145
4th	Sam Chartier	€160,775
5th	Christoph Vogelsang	€121,020
6th	Fedor Holz	€96,625
7th	Timothy Adams (0/1)	€81,420
