= 2015 World Series of Poker Europe =

Series of poker tournaments

The 2015 World Series of Poker Europe (WSOPE) was held from October 8th to the 24th at the Spielbank Casino in Berlin, Germany. There were 10 bracelet events, including a €550 Oktoberfest No Limit Hold'em event and a €550 Pot Limit Omaha event, the lowest buy-in for an Omaha tournament in WSOP history. The series of events culminated in the €10,450 Main Event beginning on October 18th, and the €25,600 High Roller event on October 21st. This was the first WSOP Europe since 2013, and the first held in Germany.

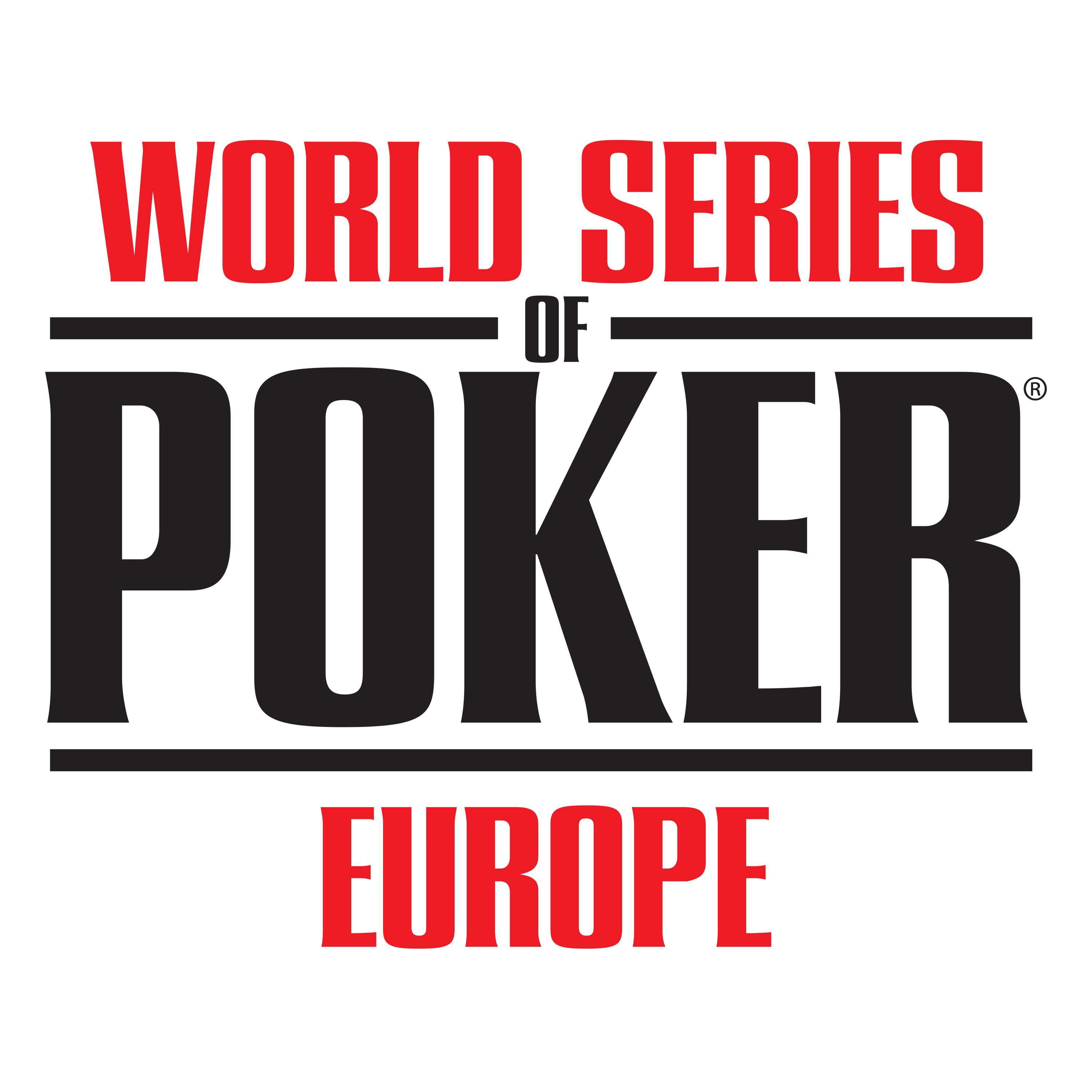

== Event schedule ==
#	Event	Entrants	Winner	Prize	Runner-up	Results
1	€2,200 Six Handed No Limit Hold'em	197	Makarios Avramidis (1/1)	€105,000	Frederic Schwarzer	Results
2	€550 The Oktoberfest No Limit Hold'em	2,144	Dietrich Fast (1/1)	€157,749	John Gale (1/2)	Results
3	€3,250 Eight Handed Pot Limit Omaha	161	Richard Gryko (1/1)	€126,345	Mike Leah (0/1)	Results
4	€1,650 Monster Stack No Limit Hold'em	580	Ryan Hefter (1/1)	€176,205	Gilbert Diaz	Results
5	€2,200 Mixed Event	113	Alex Komaromi (1/1)	€65,740	Scott Clements (0/2)	Results
6	€3,250 No Limit Hold'em	256	Pavlos Xanthopoulos (1/1)	€182,510	Mario Lopez	Results
7	€550 Pot Limit Omaha	503	Barny Boatman (1/2)	€54,725	Grzegorz Grochulski	Results
8	€1,100 Turbo No Limit Hold'em Re-Entry	546	Georgios Sotiropoulos (1/1)	€112,133	Paul Tedeschi	Results
9	€10,450 No Limit Hold'em Main Event	313	Kevin MacPhee (2/2)	€883,000	David Lopez	Results
10	€25,600 High Roller No Limit Hold'em	64	Jonathan Duhamel (2/3)	€554,395	Davidi Kitai (0/3)	Results

== Player of the Year ==
Final standings as of 24 October (end of WSOPE):

Standings
Rank	Name	Points	Bracelets
1	(Russia) Mike Gorodinsky	2,251.81	1
2	(Canada) Jonathan Duhamel	2,174.64	2
3	(United States) Kevin MacPhee	2,168.98	2
4	(United States) Brian Hastings	2,122.53	2
5	(United States) Shaun Deeb	2,056.40	1
6	(United States) Anthony Zinno	1,942.72	1
7	(United States) Paul Volpe	1,889.46	0
8	(Germany) Ismael Bojang	1,808.40	0
9	(United Kingdom) Stephen Chidwick	1,764.68	0
10	(Canada) Mike Leah	1,710.95	0

== Main Event ==
The 2015 World Series of Poker Europe Main Event began on 18 October and finished on 24 October. The event drew 313 entrants, generating a prize pool of €3,067,400. The top 32 players finished in the money, with the winner earning €883,000.

=== Final Table ===
Name	Number of chips (percentage of total)	WSOP Bracelets	WSOP Cashes*	WSOP Earnings*
(United States) Kevin MacPhee	5,015,000 (53.4%)	1	30	$1,125,142
(United States) Andrew Lichtenberger	2,135,000 (22.7%)	0	29	$2,034,138
(Mexico) J.C. Alvarado	1,070,000 (11.4%)	0	9	$270,361
(Spain) David Lopez	520,000 (5.5%)	0	0	0
(Austria) Kilian Kramer	435,000 (4.6%)	0	8	$376,994
(Switzerland) Felix Bleiker	215,000 (2.3%)	0	1	$10,385

*-Career statistics prior to beginning of 2015 WSOPE Main Event

=== Final Table results ===
Place	Name	Prize
1st	Kevin MacPhee (2/2)	€883,000
2nd	David Lopez	€475,000
3rd	J.C. Alvarado	€315,000
4th	Andrew Lichtenberger	€225,000
5th	Kilian Kramer	€175,000
6th	Felix Bleiker	€130,000
7th	Erik Seidel (0/8)	€100,000
8th	Mario Sanchez	€75,000
