= 2015 World Series of Poker =

Series of poker tournaments

- Location: Rio All-Suite Hotel and Casino, Las Vegas, Nevada
- Dates: May 27 – July 14

Champion
- (United States) Joe McKeehen

The 2015 World Series of Poker is the 46th annual World Series of Poker (WSOP). It was held from May 27 – July 14 at the Rio All-Suite Hotel & Casino in Paradise, Nevada. There were 68 bracelet events, culminating in the $10,000 No Limit Hold'em Main Event, which began on July 5. The November Nine concept returned for an eighth year. Instead of a $10 million guaranteed first prize for the Main Event, however, there were now 1,000 guaranteed payouts.

New tournament formats included the $565 Colossus No Limit Hold'em event, the lowest buy-in open event at the WSOP since the 1980 WSOP. The tournament featured four starting flights with a re-entry option for each flight and a $5,000,000 guaranteed prize pool. The $1,000 WSOP.com No Limit Hold'em event awarded the first WSOP bracelet in an online tournament, with the final six players playing at the Rio on July 4. A bounty tournament was also featured, with a player earning $500 for each elimination. A Super Seniors event was also added, open to players 65 or older. In addition to these new formats, the structure for lower buy-in events was also altered and featured five times the buy-in for a starting stack.

== Event schedule ==
Online event.

#	Event	Entrants	Winner	Prize	Runner-up	Results
1	$565 Casino Employees No Limit Hold'em	688	Brandon Barnette (1/1)	$75,704	Greg Seiden	Results
2	$5,000 No Limit Hold'em	422	Michael Wang (1/1)	$466,120	Bryn Kenney (0/1)	Results
3	$1,500 Omaha Hi-Lo 8 or Better	918	Robert Mizrachi (1/3)	$251,022	Jacob Dahl	Results
4	$3,000 No Limit Hold'em Shootout	308	Nick Petrangelo (1/1)	$201,812	Jason Les	Results
5	$565 The Colossus No Limit Hold'em	22,374	Cord Garcia (1/1)	$638,880	Bradley McFarland	Results
6	$1,000 Hyper Hold'em	1,436	John Reading (1/1)	$252,068	Marc Macdonnell	Results
7	$10,000 Limit 2-7 Triple Draw Lowball Championship	109	Tuan Le (1/2)	$322,756	Max Casal	Results
8	$1,500 Pot Limit Hold'em	639	Paul Michaelis (1/1)	$189,818	Tom Marchese	Results
9	$1,500 Razz	462	Max Pescatori (1/3)	$155,947	Ryan Miller	Results
10	$10,000 Heads Up No Limit Hold'em Championship	143	Keith Lehr (1/2)	$334,430	Paul Volpe (0/1)	Results
11	$1,500 Limit Hold'em	660	William Kakon (1/1)	$196,055	Daniel Needleman	Results
12	$1,500 No Limit Hold'em 6-Handed	1,651	Idan Raviv (1/1)	$457,007	Iaron Lightbourne	Results
13	$2,500 Omaha/Seven Card Stud Hi-Lo 8 or Better	474	Konstantin Maslak (1/1)	$269,612	Hani Awad	Results
14	$1,500 No Limit Hold'em Shootout	1,000	Barry Hutter (1/1)	$283,546	Benjamin Zamani	Results
15	$10,000 Pot Limit Hold'em Championship	128	Shaun Deeb (1/1)	$318,857	Paul Volpe (0/1)	Results
16	$1,500 Millionaire Maker No Limit Hold'em	7,275	Adrian Buckley (1/1)	$1,277,193	Javier Zarco	Results
17	$10,000 Razz Championship	103	Phil Hellmuth (1/14)	$271,105	Mike Gorodinsky (0/1)	Results
18	$1,000 Turbo No Limit Hold'em	1,791	John Gale (1/2)	$298,290	Gary Luther	Results
19	$3,000 Limit Hold'em 6-Handed	319	Matthew Elsby (1/1)	$230,799	Gabriel Nassif	Results
20	$1,500 No Limit Hold'em	1,844	Benjamin Zamani (1/1)	$460,640	Natasha Barbour	Results
21	$10,000 Omaha Hi-Lo 8 or Better Championship	157	Daniel Alaei (1/5)	$391,097	Kyle Miaso	Results
22	$1,000 No Limit Hold'em	1,915	Sam Greenwood (1/1)	$318,977	Cole Jackson	Results
23	$1,500 No Limit 2-7 Draw Lowball	219	Christian Pham (1/1)	$81,314	Daniel Ospina	Results
24	$1,500 H.O.R.S.E.	772	Arash Ghaneian (1/1)	$239,750	Robert Campbell	Results
25	$5,000 No Limit Hold'em 8-Handed	493	Jeff Tomlinson (1/1)	$567,724	Pierre Milan (0/1)	Results
26	$1,000 Pot Limit Omaha	1,293	Aaron Wallace (1/1)	$226,985	Marko Neumann	Results
27	$10,000 Seven Card Stud Championship	91	Brian Hastings (1/2)	$239,518	Scott Clements (0/2)	Results
28	$1,500 No Limit Hold'em Monster Stack	7,192	Perry Shiao (1/1)	$1,286,942	Eric Place	Results
29	$10,000 No Limit 2-7 Draw Lowball Championship	77	Phil Galfond (1/1)	$224,383	Nick Schulman (0/2)	Results
30	$1,000 No Limit Hold'em	2,150	Ivan Luca (1/1)	$353,391	Artur Rudziankov	Results
31	$3,000 Pot Limit Omaha Hi-Lo 8 or Better	480	Jeff Madsen (1/4)	$301,413	Jean-Marc Thomas	Results
32	$5,000 No Limit Hold'em 6-Handed	550	Jason Mercier (1/3)	$633,357	Simon Deadman	Results
33	$1,500 Limit 2-7 Triple Draw Lowball	388	Benny Glaser (1/1)	$136,215	Brock Parker (0/3)	Results
34	$1,500 Split Format Hold'em	873	Andre Boyer (1/2)	$250,483	Erwann Pecheux	Results
35	$3,000 H.O.R.S.E.	376	Daniel Idema (1/3)	$261,774	Matt Vengrin	Results
36	$1,500 Pot Limit Omaha	978	Corrie Wunstel (1/1)	$266,874	Kevin Saul	Results
37	$10,000 No Limit Hold'em 6-Handed Championship	259	Byron Kaverman (1/1)	$657,351	Doug Polk (0/1)	Results
38	$3,000 No Limit Hold'em	989	Thiago Nishijima (1/1)	$546,843	Sotirios Koutoupas	Results
39	$1,500 Ten-Game Mix	380	Brian Hastings (2/3)	$133,403	Rostislav Tsodikov	Results
40	$1,000 Seniors No Limit Hold'em Championship	4,193	Travis Baker (1/1)	$613,466	Carl Torelli	Results
41	$10,000 Seven Card Stud Hi-Lo 8 or Better Championship	111	Max Pescatori (2/4)	$292,158	Stephen Chidwick	Results
42	$1,500 Extended Play No Limit Hold'em	1,914	Adrian Apmann (1/1)	$478,102	Yehoram Houri	Results
43	$1,000 Super Seniors No Limit Hold'em	1,533	Jon Andlovec (1/1)	$262,220	Rodney H. Pardey (0/2)	Results
44	$50,000 Poker Players Championship	84	Mike Gorodinsky (1/2)	$1,270,086	Jean-Robert Bellande	Results
45	$1,500 No Limit Hold'em	1,655	Upeshka De Silva (1/1)	$424,577	Dara O'Kearney	Results
46	$3,000 Pot Limit Omaha 6-Handed	682	Vasili Firsau (1/1)	$437,575	Nipun Java	Results
47	$2,500 No Limit Hold'em	1,244	Matt O'Donnell (1/1)	$551,941	Timur Margolin	Results
48	$1,500 Seven Card Stud	327	Eli Elezra (1/3)	$112,591	Benjamin Lazer	Results
49	$1,500 Pot Limit Omaha Hi-Lo 8 or Better	815	Young Ji (1/1)	$231,102	Mark Dube	Results
50	$10,000 Limit Hold'em Championship	117	Ben Yu (1/1)	$291,456	Jesse Martin	Results
51	$3,000 No Limit Hold'em 6-Handed	1,043	Justin Liberto (1/1)	$640,711	Seamus Cahill	Results
52	$1,500 Dealers Choice	357	Carol Fuchs (1/1)	$127,735	Ilya Krupin	Results
53	$10,000/$1,000 Ladies No Limit Hold'em Championship	795	Jacquelyn Scott (1/1)	$153,876	Hope Williams	Results
54	$10,000 Pot Limit Omaha Championship	387	Alexander Petersen (1/1)	$927,655	Jason Mercier (1/3)	Results
55	$1,500 Draftkings 50/50 No Limit Hold'em	1,123	Brandon Wittmeyer (1/1)	$200,618	Derek Gomez	Results
56	$5,000 Turbo No Limit Hold'em	454	Kevin MacPhee (1/1)	$490,800	Igor Yaroshevskyy	Results
57	$1,000 No Limit Hold'em	2,497	Takahiro Nakai (1/1)	$399,039	Mel Wiener (0/1)	Results
58	$111,111 High Roller for One Drop	135	Jonathan Duhamel (1/2)	$3,989,985	Bill Klein	Results
59	$1,500 No Limit Hold'em	2,155	Alex Lindop (1/1)	$531,037	Aurelien Guiglini	Results
60	$25,000 High Roller Pot Limit Omaha	175	Anthony Zinno (1/1)	$1,122,196	Pakinai Lisawad	Results
61	$1,111 The Little One for One Drop	4,555	Paul Hoefer (1/1)	$645,969	Mario Lopez	Results
62	$1,500 Bounty No Limit Hold'em	2,178	Jack Duong (1/1)	$333,351	Vitezslav Pesta	Results
63	$10,000 H.O.R.S.E. Championship	204	Andrew Barber (1/1)	$517,766	Viacheslav Zhukov (0/2)	Results
64	$1,000 WSOP.com Online No Limit Hold'em	905	Anthony Spinella (1/1)	$197,743	Hunter Cichy	Results
65	$1,500 Seven Card Stud Hi-Lo 8 or Better	547	Gerald Ringe (1/1)	$180,943	Christopher Vitch	Results
66	$777 Lucky Sevens No Limit Hold'em	4,422	Connor Berkowitz (1/1)	$487,784	John Armbrust	Results
67	$10,000 Dealers Choice Championship	108	Quinn Do (1/2)	$319,792	Rep Porter (0/2)	Results
68	$10,000 No Limit Hold'em Main Event	6,420	Joe McKeehen (1/1)	$7,683,346	Joshua Beckley	Results

== Player of the Year ==
Final standings as of October 24 (end of WSOPE):

Standings
Rank	Name	Points	Bracelets
1	(Russia) Mike Gorodinsky	2,251.81	1
2	(Canada) Jonathan Duhamel	2,174.64	2
3	(United States) Kevin MacPhee	2,168.98	2
4	(United States) Brian Hastings	2,122.53	2
5	(United States) Shaun Deeb	2,056.40	1
6	(United States) Anthony Zinno	1,942.72	1
7	(United States) Paul Volpe	1,889.46	0
8	(Germany) Ismael Bojang	1,808.40	0
9	(United Kingdom) Stephen Chidwick	1,764.68	0
10	(Canada) Mike Leah	1,710.95	0

== Main Event ==
The $10,000 No Limit Hold'em Main Event began on July 5 with the first of three starting flights. The November Nine was reached on July 14, with the finalists returning on November 8. The final table was played over three days. The first day played down to the final six players, the second was played down to three players, and finally the bracelet was awarded on November 10.

The Main Event drew 6,420 players, creating a prize pool of $60,348,000. The top 1,000 players finished in the money. Each player at the final table earned over $1,000,000, with first place being $7,683,346.

=== Performance of past champions ===
Name	Championship Year(s)	Day of Elimination
Johnny Chan	1987, 1988	2AB
Phil Hellmuth	1989	4 (417th)*
Jim Bechtel	1993	5 (121st)*
Dan Harrington	1995	2AB
Huck Seed	1996	2C
Scotty Nguyen	1998	3 (713th)*
Carlos Mortensen	2001	2AB
Robert Varkonyi	2002	2C
Chris Moneymaker	2003	2AB
Greg Raymer	2004	3
Joe Hachem	2005	4 (298th)*
Jamie Gold	2006	2C
Jerry Yang	2007	1C
Peter Eastgate	2008	2C
Joe Cada	2009	1C
Jonathan Duhamel	2010	4 (565th)*
Greg Merson	2012	1C
Ryan Riess	2013	4 (426th)*
Martin Jacobson	2014	1C

* Indicates the place of a player who finished in the money

=== Other notable high finishes ===
NB: This list is restricted to top 100 finishers with an existing Wikipedia entry.

Place	Name	Prize
11th	Daniel Negreanu	$526,778
25th	Fedor Holz	$262,574
36th	Upeshka De Silva	$211,821
49th	Brian Hastings	$137,300
51st	Matthew Jarvis	$137,300
53rd	Toby Lewis	$137,300
64th	Justin Bonomo	$96,445
95th	Brandon Adams	$55,649

=== November Nine ===
Name	Number of chips (percentage of total)	WSOP Bracelets	WSOP Cashes*	WSOP Earnings*
(United States) Joe McKeehen	63,100,000 (32.8%)	0	8	$883,494
(Israel) Ofer Zvi Stern	29,800,000 (15.5%)	0	5	$58,384
(United States) Neil Blumenfield	22,000,000 (11.4%)	0	3	$44,395
(Belgium) Pierre Neuville	21,075,000 (10.9%)	0	19	$591,460
(United States) Max Steinberg	20,200,000 (10.5%)	1	11	$1,406,138
(United States) Thomas Cannuli	12,250,000 (6.4%)	0	2	$20,203
(United States) Joshua Beckley	11,800,000 (6.1%)	0	4	$19,403
(United States) Patrick Chan	6,225,000 (3.2%)	0	4	$113,145
(Italy) Federico Butteroni	6,200,000 (3.2%)	0	2	$49,255

*Career statistics prior to the beginning of the 2015 Main Event.

=== Final Table ===
Place	Name	Prize
1st	Joe McKeehen	$7,683,346
2nd	Joshua Beckley	$4,470,896
3rd	Neil Blumenfield	$3,398,298
4th	Max Steinberg	$2,615,361
5th	Ofer Zvi Stern	$1,911,423
6th	Thomas Cannuli	$1,426,283
7th	Pierre Neuville	$1,203,293
8th	Federico Butteroni	$1,097,056
9th	Patrick Chan	$1,001,020

== Records ==
The $565 Colossus No Limit Hold'em event established a new record for largest field in a WSOP event, attracting 22,374 entrants. The previous record was set in the 2006 Main Event with 8,773. The event also set a new record as the largest live poker tournament.

With his victory in the $10,000 Limit 2-7 Triple Draw Lowball Championship, Tuan Le became the first player to win the same $10,000 buy-in event in consecutive years since Johnny Chan won the Main Event in 1988. Counting all buy-in amounts, he is the first to accomplish this feat since Thang Luu won his second consecutive $1,500 Omaha Hi-Low Split-8 or Better event in 2009.
