= Pierre Neuville =

Belgian poker player (1943–2026)

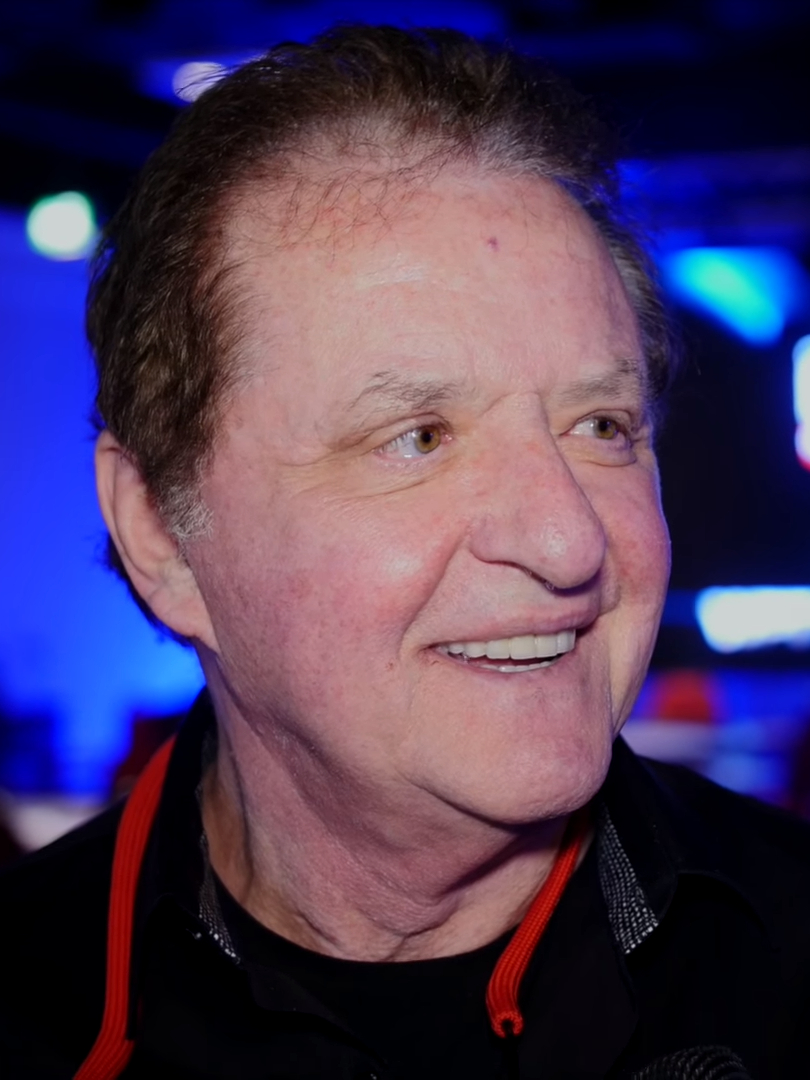
- Neuville in 2016
- Born: 2 January 1943; Montigny-le-Tilleul, German-occupied Belgium and Northern France
- Died: 26 August 2026 (aged 83)

World Series of Poker
- Money finishes: 19
- Highest WSOP Main Event finish: 7th, 2015

European Poker Tour
- Money finishes: 14

Pierre Neuville (2 January 1943 – 26 August 2026) was a Belgian professional poker player, known as the Serial PokerStars Qualifier, most notably for his record 23 consecutive EPT Main Event qualifications. Neuville was the oldest PokerStars Team Pro and one of the November Nine in the 2015 World Series of Poker finishing 7th.

== Early life ==
Neuville was born in Montigny-le-Tilleul, Belgium on 2 January 1943. He discovered poker in 1957 and played throughout his six years at Université Libre de Bruxelles, which he attended between 1963 and 1969.

In 1969 he designed a board game, called Eddy Merckx, after the famous cyclist, and started a toy company, which he sold to American toy giant Hasbro in 1982. Neuville stayed on as Vice President with Hasbro for another ten years.

In 1993 Neuville took a new direction. He started a personal consulting service and some of his famous clients over the 15 years until his retirement in 2008 included Belgian table-tennis player Jean-Michel Saive, golf star Gary Player, and Hollywood actor Kevin Costner.

== Poker career ==
His first recorded cash dates back to November 2007 and the Belgian Poker Championship, where he won €5,022 for his 31st-place finish. In January 2008 Neuville played the Main Event in the European Poker Tour PokerStars Caribbean Adventure, where he finished 18th out of 1,136 entrants and started his bankroll with the $48,000 prize money. Later he cashed in 39 EPT events, and has made 15 final tables. In fact, Neuville set an unprecedented record by qualifying for the EPT Main Event 23 consecutive times. This earned him the title of "Online Qualifier of the Year" in 2012 and a new nickname on PokerStars: ‘the Serial PokerStars Qualifier’. Until his death, he still played online with his nickname "Zoutechamp" and was the oldest PokerStars Team Pro.

In his acceptance speech for the Lifetime Achievement Award (European Poker Awards, March 2015) Neuville vowed, "The best is still to come!" Indeed, the 72-year-old Belgian followed this up with his best performance ever in the World Series of Poker Main Event and made the 2015 November Nine, where he started fourth in chips.

== Biggest cashes ==
Pierre Neuville’s biggest cashes include runner-up finishes in WSOP and EPT Main Events:
$385,041 in WSOP 2014 Event #24
$384,245 in EPT Season 6 Vilamoura, 2009
$290,693 in EPT Season 8 Copenhagen, 2012
As one of the WSOP 2015 November Nine, he was guaranteed at least 9th place prize money of $1,001,020. Despite entering the Final Table 4th in chips, he exited in 7th Place after being knocked out by Joe McKeehen. Neuville received $1,203,293 for his efforts.

== Death ==
Neuville died after a long battle with prostate cancer on 26 August 2026, at the age of 83.

== Poker rankings ==
As of 2024, Neuville had amassed more than $4,900,000 in live poker tournament earnings and ranked fourth in the Belgian all-time money list. He holds a world record for qualifying online for EPT Main Events 23 consecutive times. Neuville also topped the all-time Belgium ranking by number of live cashes.
