= No Reservations (film) =

2007 film by Scott Hicks

- Theatrical release poster
- Directed by: Scott Hicks
- Screenplay by: Carol Fuchs
- Based on: Mostly Martha by Sandra Nettelbeck
- Produced by: Kerry Heysen; Sergio Aguero
- Starring: Catherine Zeta-Jones; Aaron Eckhart; Abigail Breslin; Patricia Clarkson
- Cinematography: Stuart Dryburgh
- Edited by: Pip Karmel
- Music by: Philip Glass
- Production companies: Castle Rock Entertainment; Village Roadshow Pictures
- Distributed by: Warner Bros. Pictures (United States); Roadshow Entertainment (Australia)
- Release dates: July 27, 2007 (United States); August 23, 2007 (Australia)
- Running time: 104 minutes
- Countries: United States; Australia
- Language: English
- Budget: $28 million
- Box office: $92.6 million

No Reservations is a 2007 romantic comedy-drama film directed by Scott Hicks and starring Catherine Zeta-Jones, Aaron Eckhart, and Abigail Breslin. The screenplay by Carol Fuchs is an adaptation of an original script by Sandra Nettelbeck, which served as the basis for the 2001 German film Mostly Martha, and revolves around a hard-edged chef whose life is turned upside down when she decides to take in her young niece following a tragic accident that killed her sister. Patricia Clarkson, Bob Balaban, and Jenny Wade co-star, with Brían F. O'Byrne, Lily Rabe, and Zoë Kravitz—appearing in her first feature film—playing supporting roles.

The film received a mixed reception from critics, who found it "too predictable and melancholy for the genre". Released on July 27, 2007, in the United States and Canada, No Reservations grossed $12 million in its opening weekend. It grossed a total of $92.6 million worldwide. Breslin was nominated for a Young Artist Award for her performance.

== Plot ==
Kate Armstrong is the head chef at the trendy 22 Bleecker Street Restaurant in Manhattan's West Village. She runs her kitchen at a rapid pace as she coordinates the making and preparation of all the fantastic meals, and personally displays the food to perfection on every dish.

Kate intimidates everyone around her, including her boss Paula, who sends her to psychotherapy. She hates to leave the kitchen when a customer wants to compliment her face-to-face on one of her special dishes. However, she shoots out of the kitchen in an instant when a customer insults her cooking.

Expecting more positive interactions between Kate and their customers, Paula openly tells her she regularly is tempted to fire her. Back in the kitchen, Kate tries to assure herself they are empty threats, but her co-workers do little to alleviate her concerns.

When Kate's sister Christine is killed in a car accident on the road to visiting her, her nine-year-old niece Zoe must move in with her. Kate is devastated by her sister's death and with all of her problems, Paula decides to hire a new sous chef to join the staff. She hires Nick Palmer, a rising star in his own right and could be the head chef of any restaurant he pleased, but he wants to work under Kate.

The atmosphere in the kitchen is somewhat chaotic as Kate feels increasingly threatened by Nick, due to his style of running her kitchen. He loves to listen to opera while he cooks and also make the staff laugh. Kate also finds herself strangely attracted to Nick, whose uplifting personality has not only affected her staff but Zoe as well, who has been coming to work with her and bonded with him.

With all that is happening in Kate's life, the last thing she would want is to fall in love with this man, as she has pushed away all others prior. Nevertheless, there is chemistry between them that only flourishes with their passion for cooking. Yet life hits her hard when Paula offers Nick the job of head chef, to replace Kate.

Kate allows herself to become vulnerable and tear down the walls she has built throughout her life so that she and Nick could start fresh, and Zoe, Nick, and Kate go on to open their own bistro.

== Cast ==
- Catherine Zeta-Jones as Kate Armstrong
- Aaron Eckhart as Nicholas "Nick" Palmer
- Abigail Breslin as Zoe Armstrong, Kate's niece
- Bob Balaban as therapist
- Brían F. O'Byrne as Sean
- Patricia Clarkson as Paula
- Celia Weston as Mrs. Peterson
- Stephanie Berry as School Principal Ellen Parker
- John McMartin as Mr. Peterson
- Lily Rabe as Bernadette
- Jenny Wade as Leah
- Arija Bareikis as Christine Armstrong, Kate's sister and Zoe's mother
- Zoë Kravitz as Charlotte
- Dearbhla Molloy as Anna
- Matt Servitto as doctor
- Fulvio Cecere as fish vendor Bob

== Production ==
The film was scored by Philip Glass, who also appears in the final bistro scenes. The film soundtrack makes extensive use of operatic music, and includes Liz Phair's song "Count On My Love". Filming took place in New York in 2006–07.

== Reception ==
=== Box office ===
No Reservations grossed $43.1 million in the United States and Canada, and $49.5 million in other territories, for a worldwide total of $92.6 million, against a production budget of $28 million. In the United States and Canada, the film grossed $11.7 million from 2,425 theaters on its opening weekend, ranking fifth. The audience was 63% female and 74% over 25 years of age.

=== Critical response ===
On the review aggregator website Rotten Tomatoes, the film has an approval rating of 42% based on 158 reviews, with an average rating of 5.5/10. The website's critics consensus reads, "This romantic comedy may look good on paper, but it's too predictable and melancholy for the genre." On Metacritic, it has a weighted average score of 50 out of 100, based on reviews from 33 critics, indicating "mixed or average" reviews. Audiences polled by CinemaScore gave the film a grade "B+" on scale of A to F.

Matt Zoller Seitz of The New York Times said, "What's unexpected and gratifying ... is the film's enlightened attitude toward parenthood and work, which the movie's publicity campaign conspicuously glosses over, even though it's the story's driving force ... Make no mistake: No Reservations is a factory-sealed romantic comedy ... But the emotional details of Kate, Nick and Zoe's journey are surprising, honest and life-size, and the film's determination to present their predicament sympathetically, without appealing to retrograde ideals of femininity and motherhood, makes it notable, and in some ways unique." Roger Ebert of the Chicago Sun-Times stated, "The movie is focused on two kinds of chemistry: of the kitchen, and of the heart. The kitchen works better, with shots of luscious-looking food, arranged like organic still lifes. But chemistry among Nick, Kate and Zoe is curiously lacking, except when we sense some fondness—not really love—between Zoe and her potential new dad ... the characters seem to feel more passion for food than for each other."

Carina Chocano of the Los Angeles Times called the film "one of those movies that presents life precisely and meticulously as it isn't, presumably as some kind of consolation for how it really is" and added, "With its simplistic compartmentalization of dueling personality types, kindergarten view of grown-up love, exquisite styling, overripe camera moves and lousy, overwrought score, the movie feels stubbornly, resolutely disingenuous and one-dimensional. Everything in it is designed to make you feel better, so why does it feel artificial and palliative in that really depressing way?" Todd McCarthy of Variety observed, "Agreeably prepared and attractively presented, this remake of the tasty 2001 German feature Mostly Martha bears too many earmarks of Hollywood packaging and emotional button-pushing, but doesn't go far wrong by closely sticking to the original's smart story construction ... Scott Hicks' work cuts both ways, creating a warm cocoon that fosters engagement with the well-drawn characters while at the same time steering the material in softer-than-necessary directions and refraining from peeking any deeper into the main characters to suggest what makes them tick. Without question, Ratatouille deals more profoundly with the personality makeup and urges of a driven chef-as-artist than does this genial divertissement."

=== Accolades ===
Breslin was nominated for the Young Artist Award for Best Performance in a Feature Film by a Leading Young Actress for her performance as Zoe.

== See also ==
- List of American films of 2007
- Mostly Martha
