= Carol Fuchs =

American poker player, entertainment attorney, and producer

Carol Diane Fuchs
- Born: October 19, 1962 (age 64)

World Series of Poker
- Bracelet: 1
- Money finishes: 23

Carol Diane Fuchs (b. October 19, 1962) is an American entertainment attorney, producer, and World Series of Poker bracelet winner.

Fuchs wrote the screenplay for the 2007 romantic comedy No Reservations.

Fuchs' sister is attorney Jacqueline Fuchs, who was known as Jackie Fox when a member of The Runaways rock and roll band in the 1970s. Carol Fuchs is married to Martin Shafer, Chairman/CEO of Castle Rock Entertainment. They have two children, Jessica (b 1992) and Richard (b. 1997).

Fuchs and Shafer sometimes play in a home poker game featuring other Castle Rock executives.

At the 2015 World Series of Poker, Fuchs won the $1500 Dealer's Choice tournament and its $127,735 first prize, making her the first female winner at the 2015 WSOP in an open field event, and the 21st woman to win an open event bracelet. Fuchs previously won titles at the L.A. Poker Open in 2005 and 2011. Fuchs started playing poker after reading Positively Fifth Street by James McManus. As of 2025, Fuchs' total live poker tournament winnings exceed $885,000.

World Series of Poker bracelets
Year	Tournament	Prize (US$)
2015	$1,500 Dealers Choice	$127,735
