= Ben Sulsky =

American poker player (born 1987)

- Nicknames: Sauce123; Sauce1234; PrtectYaNeck
- Born: November 22, 1987 (age 38)

World Series of Poker
- Bracelet: None
- Final tables: 2
- Money finishes: 4

Benjamin Sulsky (born November 22, 1987) is an American professional poker player from Durham, New Hampshire. Sulsky plays under the aliases Sauce123 on PokerStars and Sauce1234 on Full Tilt Poker. He specializes in Pot Limit Omaha (PLO) and No-Limit hold'em (NLHE).

== Poker career ==
Sulsky started playing online freeroll tournaments never depositing any money when he first started playing. He built up a bankroll of $3,000 and proceeded to lose $1,200 in one night. He cashed out the rest and did not play poker for two years. He returned with a $1,000 deposit, which he lost. He deposited another $1,000 and started playing $0.10/$0.25 with bankroll management rules of 25–30 buy-ins. Sulsky never went broke and never looked back.

By 2012, he was considered one of the best players in the world at NLHE and PLO. He described having trouble finding action as other players refused to play him. He defeated Phil Galfond at the 2013 World Series of Poker $10,000 No Limit Hold'em heads-up event finishing 4th for $110,485. He is currently an instructor for Galfond's website Run It Once.

In 2013, Sulsky played fellow professional poker player Doug Polk in a highly publicized match of 15,000 hands in heads up No-Limit hold 'em and was defeated for $740,000. Polk also received an additional $100,000 bonus for his victory.

Sulsky is considered an online cash game specialist rarely playing live tournaments. Sulsky has won over $5,500,000 on his PokerStars account, Sauce123, but is down over $400,000 on his Full Tilt account, Sauce1234. He formerly played as PrtectYaNeck on Full Tilt earning over $500,000.

He became more active on the live tournament circuit during the 2015 World Series of Poker finishing 4th in both the $50,000 Poker Player's Championship and the $100,000 One Drop tournament earning over $1,400,000. As of October 2016, his total live winnings exceed $1,700,000.
