= Danny Nguyen =

Vietnamese-American poker player

- Nickname: Danny Boy
- Born: January 8 Vietnam

World Series of Poker
- Bracelet: None
- Money finish: 1
- Highest WSOP Main Event finish: None

World Poker Tour
- Title: 1
- Final table: 1
- Money finish: 1

Danny Nguyen (born January 8 in Vietnam) is a poker dealer and poker player from San Jose, California.

Nguyen moved to America in 1981, and went on to win the $1,025,000 first prize at the Season Three World Poker Tour Bay 101 Shooting Stars event, personally eliminating all five of his final table opponents including Gus Hansen and Men Nguyen.

Nguyen's WPT win was notable for the numerous outdraws and bad beats he put on his opponents while at the final table.

- During one hand, Danny called a raise of $28,000 from Gus Hansen. Danny held 4♣ 3♣, while Gus held A♦ 7♥. The flop read 2♦ K♣ A♠. Corey Cheresnick, who was also in the hand, holding K♥ 10♦, lead out on the flop and bet $100,000 after Danny checked. Gus called the bet, and Danny, with little more than a gutshot straight draw, (needing a five to complete his straight) also called the bet. When the turn brought the J♠, Danny bet $100,000. Corey folded his pair of Kings, but Gus called with top pair (Aces). The river brought the 5♠, allowing Danny to make his straight. But when Danny checked, Gus also checked. When Danny turned over the 4♣ 3♣, Gus, looking somewhat stunned, simply said, "I can't beat it," as he mucked his cards. According to the WPT hand update on-screen, the odds of catching the 5 for a straight on the river were 9:1.
- In a later hand, Danny called an all-in bet from Men "The Master" Nguyen (no relation). Danny held J♥ J♣, and Men held Q♥ Q♦, making "The Master" a 78% favorite preflop to win the hand against Danny's 22%. The board read 3♣ 6♣ 2♦ J♠ J♦ giving Danny four of a kind, thus knocking out "The Master" in sixth place.
- On another hand, Danny pushed all of his remaining chips into the pot and his all in was called by Shandor Szentkuti. Danny held A♦ 7♦, while Shandor held A♠ K♣. The flop brought 5♥ K♥ 5♠, making Shandor a more than 99% favorite to win the hand, leaving Danny with only 1/2%, however the turn brought a 7♣, and the river brought the 7♠, giving Danny a full house and the win. According to the WPT hand update on-screen, the odds of catching running 7's for the win were 274:1.
- And on the final hand of heads-up against his opponent Dr. Jay Martens, Danny called Jay's all-in bet while holding 4♥ 3♦, and Martens held K♠ 4♦, making Martens a 70% favorite preflop. But the board read 9♥ 2♥ 10♥ 7♣ 3♣, giving Danny a pair of threes and winning him the top prize of $1,025,000 and a World Poker Tour title.

As of 2024, his total live tournament winnings exceed $1,800,000.
