= World Poker Tour season 3 results =

Below are the results of season three of the World Poker Tour television series (2004–2005).

== Results ==
=== Grand Prix de Paris ===
- Casino: Aviation Club de France, Paris
- Buy-in: €10,000
- 5-Day Event: July 17, 2004 to July 21, 2004
- Number of Entries: 205
- Total Prize Pool: €1,957,750
- Number of Payouts: 27
- Winning Hand: A♦ 7♠

Final Table
Place	Name	Prize
1st	Surinder Sunar	€679,860 ($828,956)
2nd	Tony G	€339,930 ($414,478)
3rd	Jim Overman	€203,960 ($248,689)
4th	Peter Roche	€135,970 ($165,789)
5th	Ben Roberts	€101,980 ($124,345)
6th	Dave Colclough	€84,890 ($103,507)

=== Mirage Poker Showdown ===
- Casino: The Mirage, Paradise, Nevada
- Buy-in: $10,000
- 4-Day Event: July 29, 2004 to August 1, 2004
- Number of Entries: 281
- Total Prize Pool: $2,725,200
- Number of Payouts: 27
- Winning Hand: A♦ Q♠

Final Table
Place	Name	Prize
1st	Eli Elezra	$1,024,574
2nd	Lee Watkinson	$513,038
3rd	Gabe Kaplan	$256,519
4th	John Juanda	$162,012
5th	Scotty Nguyen	$121,509
6th	Jim Meehan	$94,507

=== Legends of Poker ===
- Casino: Bicycle Casino, Los Angeles
- Buy-in: $5,000
- 4-Day Event: August 28, 2004 to August 31, 2004
- Number of Entries: 667
- Total Prize Pool: $3,335,000
- Number of Payouts: 63
- Winning Hand: Q♥ 9♥

Final Table
Place	Name	Prize
1st	Doyle Brunson	$1,198,260
2nd	Lee Watkinson	$578,375
3rd	Pete Lawson	$272,665
4th	Grant Helling	$170,175
5th	Joe Awada	$132,200
6th	Tom Lee	$99,150

=== Borgata Poker Open ===
- Casino: Borgata, Atlantic City
- Buy-in: $10,000
- 4-Day Event: September 19, 2004 to September 22, 2004
- Number of Entries: 302
- Total Prize Pool: $3,020,000
- Number of Payouts: 27
- Winning Hand: A♠ A♦

Final Table
Place	Name	Prize
1st	Daniel Negreanu	$1,117,400
2nd	David Williams	$573,800
3rd	Josh Arieh	$286,900
4th	Chris Tsiprailidis	$181,200
5th	Brandon Moran	$135,900
6th	Phil Ivey	$105,700

=== Ultimate Poker Classic ===
- Casino: Radisson Aruba Resort & Casino, Palm Beach, Aruba
- Buy-in: $6,000
- 6-Day Event: September 26, 2004 to October 1, 2004
- Number of Entries: 647
- Total Prize Pool: $3,879,000
- Number of Payouts: 200
- Winning Hand: 2♠ 2♣

Final Table
Place	Name	Prize
1st	Eric Brenes	$1,000,000
2nd	Layne Flack	$500,000
3rd	Mike Matusow	$250,000
4th	Pat McMillan	$170,000
5th	John Juanda	$130,000
6th	Vic Fey	$105,000

=== Festa Al Lago (Doyle Brunson North American Poker Championship) ===
- Casino: Bellagio, Las Vegas
- Buy-in: $10,000
- 4-Day Event: October 19, 2004 to October 22, 2004
- Number of Entries: 312
- Total Prize Pool: $3,026,400
- Number of Payouts: 50
- Winning Hand: K♣ 10♣

Final Table
Place	Name	Prize
1st	Carlos Mortensen	$1,000,000
2nd	Kido Pham	$496,400
3rd	David Pham	$255,000
4th	Erik Seidel	$165,000
5th	Hung La	$120,000
6th	John Juanda	$84,000

=== World Poker Finals ===
- Casino: Foxwoods, Mashantucket, Connecticut
- Buy-in: $10,000
- 5-Day Event: November 13, 2004 to November 17, 2004
- Number of Entries: 674
- Total Prize Pool: $6,765,000
- Number of Payouts: 60
- Winning Hand: 7♣ 6♦

Final Table
Place	Name	Prize
1st	Tuan Le	$1,549,588
2nd	Temperance Hutter	$973,256
3rd	Humberto Brenes	$636,930
4th	Bradley Berman	$470,452
5th	J.C. Tran	$353,850
6th	David Pham	$277,014

=== Five Diamond World Poker Classic ===
- Casino: Bellagio, Las Vegas
- Buy-in: $15,000
- 5-Day Event: December 14, 2004 to December 18, 2004
- Number of Entries: 376
- Total Prize Pool: $5,470,800
- Number of Payouts: 50
- Winning Hand: K♣ 7♦

Final Table
Place	Name	Prize
1st	Daniel Negreanu	$1,770,218
2nd	Humberto Brenes	$923,475
3rd	Vinny Landrum	$462,851
4th	Jennifer Harman	$299,492
5th	Steve Rassi	$217,812
6th	Nam Le	$152,468

=== PokerStars Caribbean Poker Adventure ===
- Casino: Atlantis, Paradise Island, Bahamas
- Buy-in: $7,800
- 4-Day Event: January 8, 2005 to January 11, 2005
- Number of Entries: 461
- Total Prize Pool: $3,485,000
- Number of Payouts: 75
- Winning Hand: J J

Final Table
Place	Name	Prize
1st	John Gale	$890,000
2nd	Alex Balandin	$484,000
3rd	Mikael Westerlund	$306,000
4th	Patrick Hocking	$207,000
5th	John Cernuto	$155,800
6th	Nenad Medic	$112,000

=== World Poker Open ===
- Casino: Gold Strike Tunica
- Buy-in: $10,000
- 4-Day Event: January 24, 2005 to January 27, 2005
- Number of Entries: 512
- Total Prize Pool: $4,832,773
- Number of Payouts: 44
- Winning Hand: A♣ 10♠

Final Table
Place	Name	Prize
1st	Johnny Stolzmann	$1,491,444
2nd	Chau Giang	$773,448
3rd	Daniel Negreanu	$384,322
4th	Scotty Nguyen	$336,282
5th	Michael Mizrachi	$288,241
6th	Raja Kattamuri	$240,201

=== L.A. Poker Classic ===
- Casino: Commerce Casino, Los Angeles
- Buy-in: $10,000
- 5-Day Event: February 18, 2005 to February 22, 2005
- Number of Entries: 538
- Total Prize Pool: $5,166,414
- Number of Payouts: 45
- Winning Hand: A♠ 9♦

Final Table
Place	Name	Prize
1st	Michael Mizrachi	$1,859,909
2nd	Haralabos Voulgaris	$904,122
3rd	Hung La	$444,312
4th	Ted Forrest	$263,487
5th	Erick Lindgren	$206,657
6th	Harley Hall	$154,992

=== WPT Invitational ===
- Casino: Commerce Casino, Los Angeles
- Buy-in:
- 2-Day Event: February 24, 2005
- Number of Entries: 238
- Total Prize Pool: $200,000
- Number of Payouts:
- Winning Hand: A♥ A♣

Final Table
Place	Name	Prize
1st	Alex Brenes	$100,000
2nd	Johan Storåkers	$50,000
3rd	Tom Everett Scott	$20,000
4th	Chris Ferguson	$15,000
5th	Chau Giang	$10,000
6th	Bruce Buffer	$5,000

=== Bay 101 Shooting Star ===
- Casino: Bay 101, San Jose, California
- Buy-in: $10,000
- 5-Day Event: March 7, 2005 to March 11, 2005
- Number of Entries: 438
- Total Prize Pool: $4,070,000
- Number of Payouts: 45
- Winning Hand: 4♥ 3♦

Final Table
Place	Name	Prize
1st	Danny Nguyen	$1,025,000
2nd	Jay Martens	$600,000
3rd	Gus Hansen	$320,000
4th	Shandor Szentkuti	$280,000
5th	Corey Cheresnick	$240,000
6th	Men Nguyen	$200,000

=== Party Poker Million ===
- Buy-in: $10,000
- 5-Day Event: March 19, 2005 to March 23, 2005
- Number of Entries: 735
- Total Prize Pool: $7,430,000
- Number of Payouts: 180
- Winning Hand: J♦ 2♦

Final Table
Place	Name	Prize
1st	Michael Gracz	$1,525,500
2nd	David Minto	$1,000,000
3rd	Matthew Cherackal	$700,000
4th	Adam Csallany	$500,000
5th	Paul Darden	$300,000
6th	Richard Kain	$200,000

- This event, which was limit hold 'em, had the largest prize pool in history for a tournament that was not played at no-limit hold 'em.

=== World Poker Challenge ===
- Casino: Reno Hilton, Reno
- Buy-in: $5,000
- 4-Day Event: March 29, 2005 to April 1, 2005
- Number of Entries: 345
- Total Prize Pool: $1,725,350
- Number of Payouts: 27
- Winning Hand: 4♠ 3♠

Final Table
Place	Name	Prize
1st	Arnold Spee	$633,880
2nd	Blair Rodman	$327,815
3rd	Phil Ivey	$163,908
4th	Michael Yoshino	$103,521
5th	Russ Carlson	$77,641
6th	Mark Chapic	$60,387

=== WPT Championship ===
- Casino: Bellagio, Las Vegas
- Buy-in: $25,000
- 7-Day Event: April 18, 2005 to April 24, 2005
- Number of Entries: 453
- Total Prize Pool: $10,961,000
- Number of Payouts: 100
- Winning Hand: K♦ J♦

Final Table
Place	Name	Prize
1st	Tuan Le	$2,856,150
2nd	Paul Maxfield	$1,698,390
3rd	Hasan Habib	$896,375
4th	John Phan	$518,920
5th	Rob Hollink	$377,420
6th	Phil Ivey	$264,195

== Other Events ==
During season 3 of the WPT there was one special event that did not apply to the Player of the Year standings:

- The WPT Invitational - February 23–24, 2005 - Commerce Casino - postscript to Event #11: L.A. Poker Classic - won by Alex Brenes
