= Max Pescatori =

Italian poker player (born 1971)

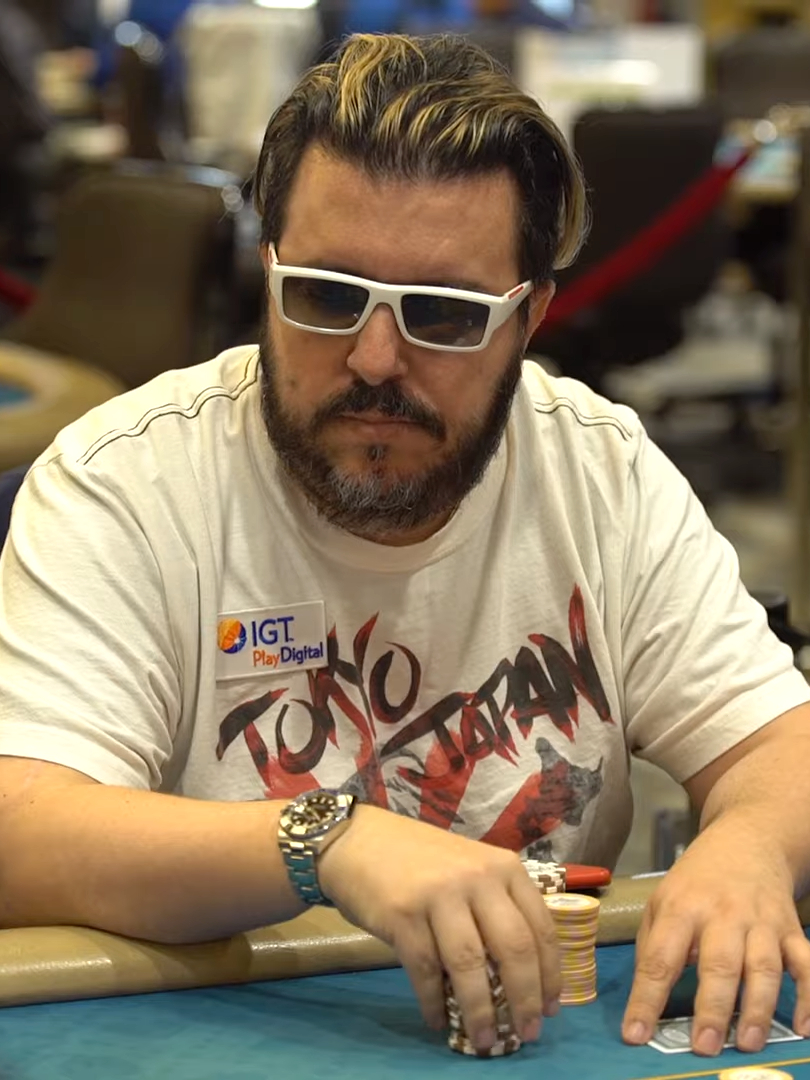
- Pescatori in 2019
- Nickname: The Italian Pirate
- Born: Massimiliano Pescatori; 22 January 1971 (age 55); Milan, Italy

World Series of Poker
- Bracelets: 4
- Money finishes: 66
- Highest WSOP Main Event finish: 365th, 2022

World Poker Tour
- Title: None
- Final table: None
- Money finishes: 8

European Poker Tour
- Title: None
- Final table: None
- Money finishes: 3

Massimiliano Pescatori (born 22 January 1971 in Milan) is an Italian professional poker player.

His first tournament win was in the $300 limit hold'em event in the 2003 World Poker Challenge in Reno, Nevada. Three days later he won the Omaha High Low event. At the 2006 WSOP, Pescatori won the $2,500 no limit hold 'em event when his J♣ 8♣ defeated Anthony Reategui's Q♣ 10♦ on a board of 10♣ 7♦ 6♥ K♥ 9♦. At the 2008 World Series of Poker he won the pot limit half Texas hold 'em, half Omaha hold 'em event, with its $246,471 first prize. At the 2015 WSOP, Pescatori won two bracelets in the $1,500 Seven Card Razz and the $10,000 Seven Card Stud Hi-Low Split-8 or Better events.

Pescatori has also finished in the money in eight World Poker Tour (WPT) events.

As of 2017, his total live tournament winnings exceed $4,475,000. His 66 cashes as the WSOP account for over $2,450,000 of those winnings.

== WSOP Bracelets ==
Year	Tournament	Prize (US$)
2006	$2,500 No Limit Hold'em	$682,389
2008	$2,500 Pot Limit Hold'em/Omaha	$246,509
2015	$1,500 Razz	$155,947
2015	$10,000 Seven Card Stud Hi-Lo 8 or Better Championship	$292,158

== Books ==
Max Pescatori has co-authored two books on poker originally written in Italian.

Book title	ISBN
Giocare e vincere a poker online, 2009, by Max Pescatori and Dario De Toffoli	ISBN 978-88-200-4760-3
A scuola di poker, 2010, by Dario De Toffoli, Max Pescatori and Giorgio Sigon	ISBN 978-88-200-4890-7
