= Tuan Le =

Vietnamese-American poker player (born 1978)

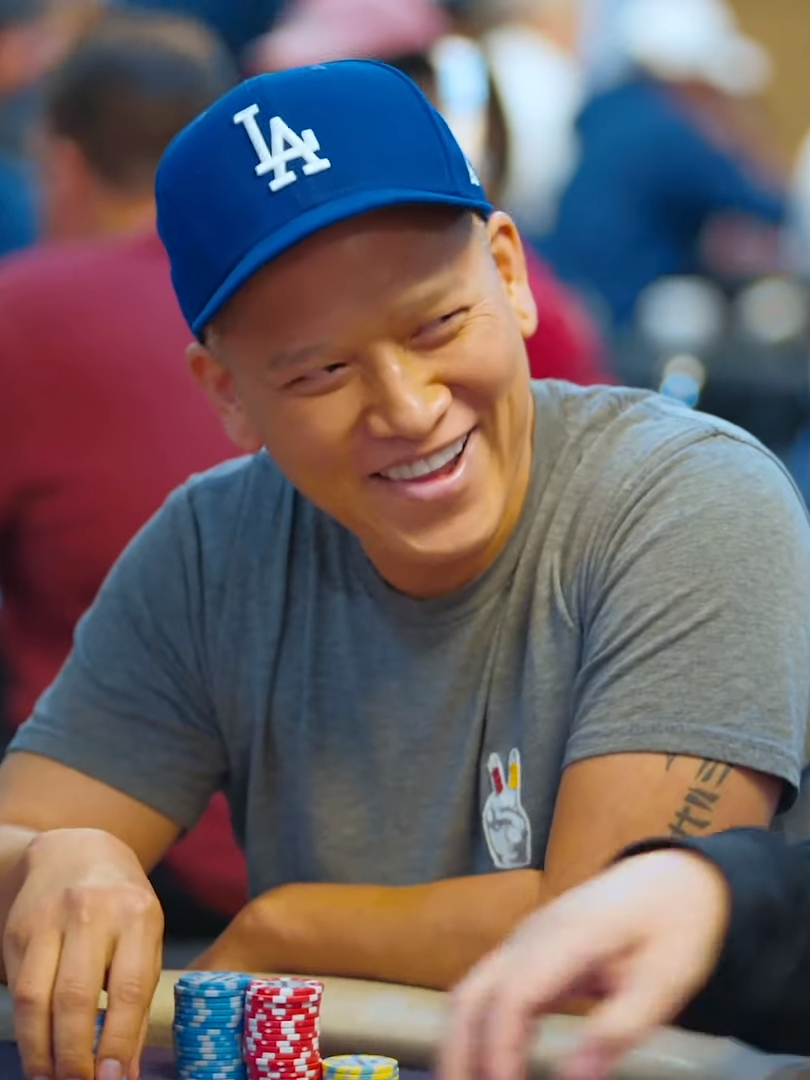
- Le at the 2019 World Poker Tour Legends of Poker
- Born: February 15, 1978 (age 48)

World Series of Poker
- Bracelets: 2
- Money finishes: 9
- Highest WSOP Main Event finish: 411th, 2013

World Poker Tour
- Titles: 2
- Final tables: 2
- Money finishes: 7

Tuan Le (born February 15, 1978, in Paris, France) is a Vietnamese-American professional poker player.

Of Vietnamese ancestry, Le was raised in Kansas City, Missouri, in the United States, but by middle school age he was living in Los Angeles, California, where he attended John Burroughs Junior High School, on McCadden and 6th Street. He later attended Cal State-Northridge as a finance major.

Le began playing in the $20/$40 limit hold'em games at the Hustler Casino in Los Angeles, where he currently resides.

As of 2015, Le's total live tournament winnings exceed $5,600,000.

== World Poker Tour ==
In 2004, Le won his first World Poker Tour (WPT) event, earning over $1,500,000. In 2005, he finished first at the World Poker Tour Season 3 Championship, winning just over $2,800,000. He won the WPT Battle of Champions III event, defeating Eli Elezra heads-up.

World Poker Tour Titles
Year	Tournament	Prize (US$)
2004	$10,000 World Poker Finals	1,574,588
2005	$25,000 WPT World Championship	2,856,150

== World Series of Poker bracelets ==
In 2014 and 2015, Le won the $10,000 Limit 2-7 Triple Draw Lowball Championship for the second year in a row. His feat was the first time in WSOP history that a player has won consecutive $10,000 championships other than the main event.

Year	Event	Prize Money
2014	$10,000 Limit 2-7 Triple Draw Lowball	$355,324
2015	$10,000 Limit 2-7 Triple Draw Lowball	$322,756
