= Michael Wang (poker) =

American poker player

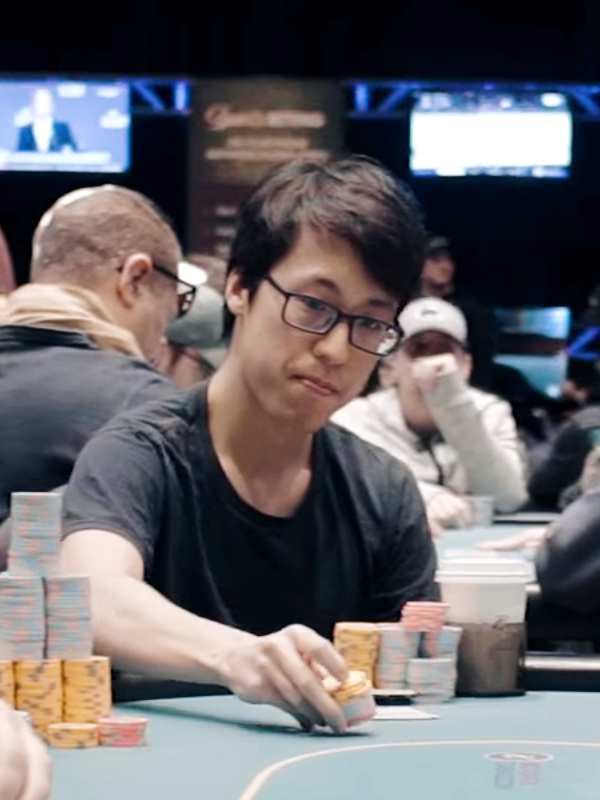
- Wang at the 2019 WPT Borgata Winter Poker Open
- Born: New Orleans, Louisiana, U.S.

World Series of Poker
- Bracelets: 3
- Final tables: 24
- Money finishes: 163
- Highest WSOP Main Event finish: 69th, 2020

World Poker Tour
- Title: 1
- Final table: 1
- Money finishes: 30

European Poker Tour
- Title: None
- Final table: 1
- Money finishes: 21

Michael Wang is a professional poker player, born in New Orleans, Louisiana, now living in Livingston, New Jersey. He learned to play poker as a teenager by mainly playing online. As of 2025, he has won three World Series of Poker bracelets and has career earnings exceeding $8,800,000.

== Poker career ==
Michael Wang has been playing poker professionally since the 2010s and already has achieved a lot in his career. Wang's first cash ever, dates back in January 2009, when he was playing at $1,700 No Limit Hold'em tournament and finished 1st, taking home $32,685. During 2010, he managed to finish in the money in few other tournaments. For 2011 there is no actual track for his performances. He appeared on the poker stage again in January 2012. He did cashed 11 times from various tournaments, including his first WSOP participation.

It was June 2012 and Michael was playing in a $1,500 NLHE WSOP tournament, he finished 123rd, for $4,595. 2013 was also a bit dark for him, having participated in only 3 tracked live tournaments. He spent time playing, studying the game and testing his skills. Soon in May 2014, he started a great year in poker. He cashed from both from WSOP connected circuits – WSOPC and WSOPE.

In May 2014 he finished first in a $1,125 No Limit Hold'em – with added National Championship entry tournament for $21,750. Then he participated in 4 WSOP tournaments, winning more than $22,000 in total earnings. October 2014 he made 2 notable cashes in WSOP APAC, he made 8th and 37th place, both exceeding more than $6,000. He also cashed twice from the WSOPC – Atlantic City. Meanwhile, he was all the time traveling in order to play poker – Hollywood, Bensalem, West Palm Beach – just a few of his points during 2014.

Till June 2015 he has 18 in the money finishes, consisting his biggest prize ever. In January, he played in the World Poker Tour – Hollywood, making 4 cashes in total for more than $80,000. Later in March and April, Wang went to play at the EPT – Malta, performing great in both tournaments, he played at. May and June 2015, mark Michael's biggest poker success ever. He played in the WSOP and he was one of the first to win a tournament. It was a $5,000 No Limit Hold'em, game was really though and Wang had to defeat a 422-poker player field and one of the most respected players. Finally he was heads-up with Bryn Kenney, after the long game, Wang came out with $466,120, plus a WSOP bracelet.

=== World Series of Poker ===
World Series of Poker bracelets
Year	Event	Prize money
2015	$5,000 No Limit Hold'em	$466,120
2022	$5,000 No-Limit Hold'em 8-Handed	$541,604
2025	$10,000 Pot Limit Omaha Championship	$1,394,579

=== World Poker Tour ===
World Poker Tour Titles
Year	Event	Prize money
2024	WPT Playground C$3,500 No Limit Hold'em	C$412,300
