= Jonathan Duhamel =

Canadian poker player (born 1987)

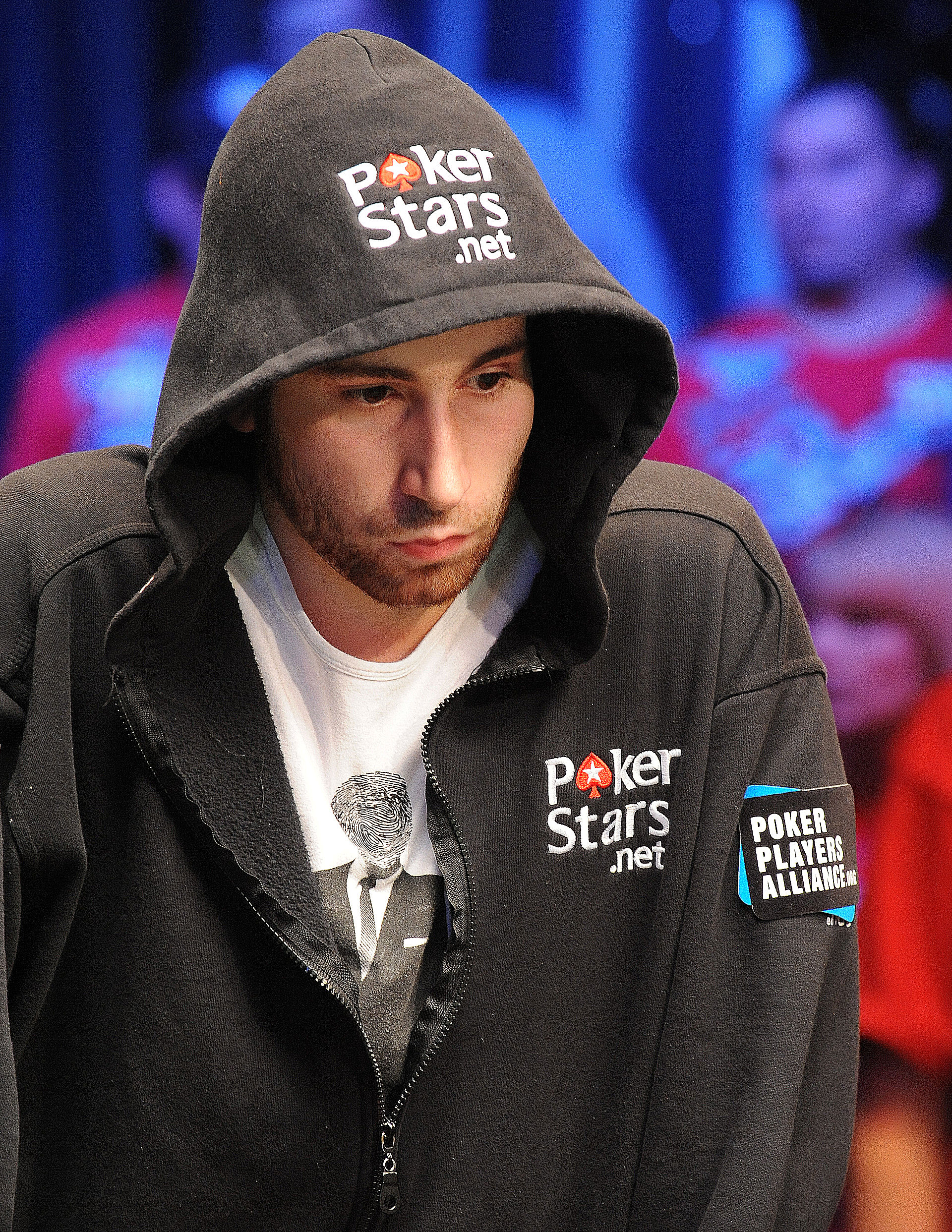
- Duhamel at the final table of the 2010 World Series of Poker Main Event
- Born: August 24, 1987 (age 39)

World Series of Poker
- Bracelets: 3
- Final tables: 8
- Money finishes: 26
- Highest WSOP Main Event finish: Winner, 2010

World Poker Tour
- Title: None
- Final table: None
- Money finishes: 3

European Poker Tour
- Title: None
- Final table: None
- Money finishes: 2

Jonathan Duhamel (born August 24, 1987) is a Canadian poker professional from Boucherville, Quebec, best known as the winner of the Main Event at the 2010 World Series of Poker (WSOP). He has won three WSOP bracelets in his career.

== Poker career ==
Jonathan Duhamel started playing poker with his high school friends during the Moneymaker boom. He later attended the Université du Québec in Montreal, studying business administration and finance. However, he did not graduate, preferring to focus on his professional poker career.

Duhamel defeated fellow poker professional John Racener heads-up to secure the 2010 Main Event title, earning $8,944,310 and becoming the first Canadian player to capture the Main Event bracelet.

A fan of the Montreal Canadiens, Duhamel elected to donate $100,000 of his winnings to the Montreal Canadiens Children's Foundation, which is the largest individual donation ever made to the organization, after his win.

In January 2011, Duhamel won the High Roller Event at the European Poker Tour (EPT) Deauville for €200,000 ($272,209). Later that year, he cashed twice at the 2011 World Series of Poker for over $40,000 in earnings.

Between January 2011 and April 2015, Duhamel was a member of Team PokerStars Pro.

In January 2012, Duhamel made four final tables at the PokerStars Caribbean Poker Adventure. He finished fourth in the Super High Roller Event after his elimination by the winner of the event, Viktor Blom. Duhamel won $313,600 for his performance. Duhamel made another final table in the turbo event, finishing fifth. Then, he finished first in a side event and won $239,830. Finally, Duhamel finished second in the High Roller Event and won $634,550.

On March 23, 2013, Duhamel finished in third place to win $125,000 at Premier League Poker VI in London.

In June 2015, Duhamel defeated Bill Klein heads-up to win the $111,111 buy-in WSOP High Roller for One Drop for $3,989,985 and his second WSOP bracelet. In October 2015, he won the $25,600 No Limit Hold'em High Roller at the World Series of Poker Europe for $628,815 and his third WSOP bracelet.

As of March 2021, Duhamel's live tournament winnings exceed $18,000,000, nearly half of which comes from his $8.9 million first place prize at the 2010 World Series of Poker Main Event.

As of November 2021, Duhamel no longer plays professionally, although he continues to play poker occasionally on a recreational level.

=== World Series of Poker bracelets ===
Year	Tournament	Prize (US$)
2010	$10,000 No Limit Hold'em World Championship	$8,944,310
2015	$111,111 High Roller for One Drop	$3,989,985
2015E	€25,600 High Roller No-Limit Hold’em	€554,395

An "E" following a year denotes bracelet(s) won at the World Series of Poker Europe

== Robbery ==
Duhamel was badly beaten in a home invasion robbery in December 2011. Duhamel's Main Event bracelet, a Rolex watch, and $150,000 in cash were stolen. Anthony Bourque and John Stephen Clark Lemay, who carried out the robbery and Andres Valderrama, the getaway driver, were arrested. Police have since recovered approximately half of the cash stolen.

== Income tax case ==
Unlike in the United States, gambling winnings are generally not considered taxable income in Canada. However, the Canada Revenue Agency has taken the position that poker earnings can be taxable if they constitute income derived from the conduct of business, which from the CRA's point of view has included playing the game on a professional basis. Based on this position, the CRA re-assessed Duhamel's income tax returns from 2010, 2011 and 2012 and demanded Duhamel remit millions of dollars in what it claimed to be unpaid taxes. Duhamel objected, leading to litigation in the Tax Court of Canada over whether his poker winnings were taxable income. The case was delayed by the COVID-19 pandemic, but eventually adjudicated in June 2022.

As Duhamel (via a corporation he owned and controlled) had already declared and paid taxes on income derived from sources such as his sponsorship agreement with PokerStars, the only issue before the court was whether Duhamel's net earnings from the WSOP Main Event and subsequent events, which he considered to be non-taxable gambling winnings, legally constituted business income for 2010, 2011 and 2012. The CRA's reassessment of the taxpayer's 2010, 2011 and 2012 taxation years included the taxpayer's net winnings from the poker tournaments in which he participated during these taxation years, on the basis that the taxpayer was carrying on a business through his poker gambling activities.

The court upheld Duhamel's appeal, finding that on a balance of probabilities the taxpayer's poker gambling activities were not carried on in a sufficiently commercial manner to constitute a source of income from a business for the purposes of the Income Tax Act, and ordered the CRA to exclude net gains from these activities in determining Duhamel's income.
