= Byron Kaverman =

Irish-born American poker player (born 1986)

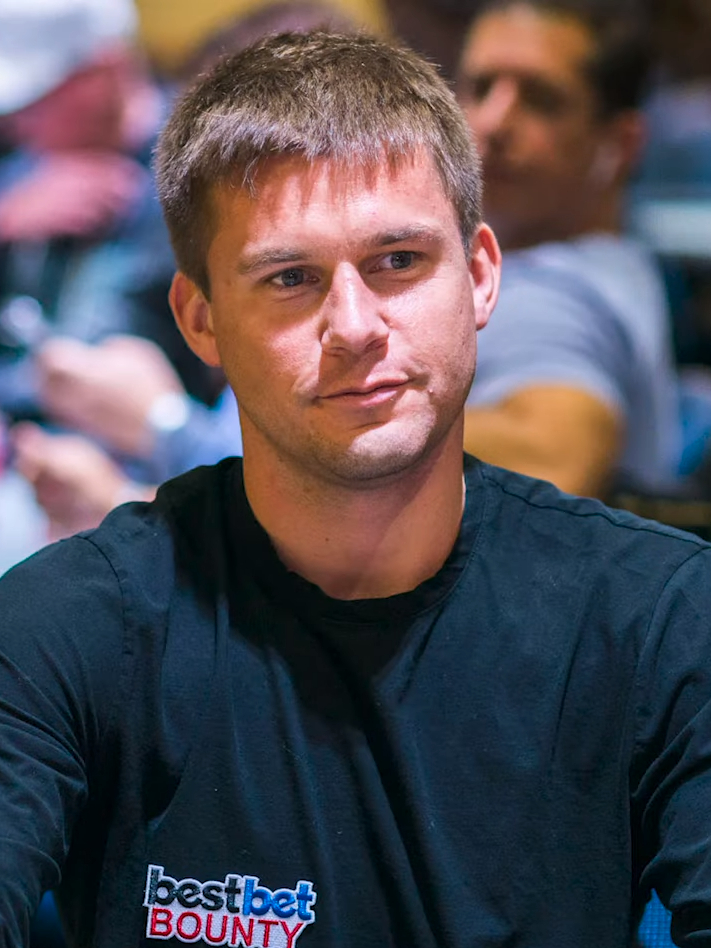
- Kaverman in 2019
- Born: 1986 (age 39–40); Fort Jennings, Ohio
World Series of Poker
- Bracelet: 1
- Money finishes: 29
- Highest WSOP Main Event finish: 34th, 2013
World Poker Tour
- Money finishes: 19
European Poker Tour
- Money finishes: 3

Byron Kaverman (born 1986) is an American professional poker player from Fort Jennings, Ohio.

== Poker career ==
Kaverman began playing poker in 2004 and first cashed in live tournament in 2008. He first cashed in the WSOP in 2008 finishing 37th in the $3,000 No Limit Hold'em event and won $7,311. He won his first bracelet in 2015 in $10,000 No Limit Hold'em Six Handed Championship event defeating Doug Polk heads-up earning $657,351 in the process.

Kaverman was eliminated from the 2018 Big One for One Drop $1,000,000 buy-in tournament after a three way all-in holding A♣ 5♣ against Rick Salomon's A♥ K♥ and Fedor Holz's 10♠ 10♣. The board ran out A♦ K♠ 2♣ Q♣ 10♦. Kaverman was eliminated in 5th winning $2,000,000 in the process.

Kaverman held the 1st place poker world rankings for 15 consecutive weeks from September 30, 2015, to January 12, 2016.

As of September 2020, Kaverman's career live tournament winnings exceed $15,400,000.

World Series of Poker bracelet
Year	Tournament	Prize
2015	$10,000 No Limit Hold'em Six Handed Championship	$657,351

== Personal life ==
Kaverman is from Fort Jennings, Ohio. He played soccer at Tiffin University. He currently resides in San Diego.
