= Mike Gorodinsky =

American poker player (born 1986)

- Nickname: gordo16
- Born: 1986 (age 39–40); Leningrad, Soviet Union

World Series of Poker
- Bracelets: 5
- Final tables: 9
- Money finishes: 21
- Highest WSOP Main Event finish: 87th, 2016

World Poker Tour
- Title: None
- Final table: None
- Money finish: 1

European Poker Tour
- Title: None
- Final table: None
- Money finishes: 2

Mike Gorodinsky (born 1986) is an American professional poker player from Denver, Colorado. He was born in St. Petersburg, Russia and at the age of six moved to St. Louis, Missouri with his family. Mike graduated from Washington University in St. Louis in 2008. He has won five World Series of Poker bracelets in his career. He won his first bracelet in 2013 with the $2,500 Omaha/Seven Card Stud Hi-Low event and the second one came in 2015 when he won the $50,000 Poker Players Championship.

His third bracelet came in the $10,000 H.O.R.S.E. Championship in 2023.

He won his fourth bracelet in the $10,000 Paradise Pot-Limit Omaha in 2024.

He won his fifth bracelet in the $10,000 Eight Game Mixed Championship in 2025.

As of 2025, his total live tournament winnings exceed $5,577,000.

== World Series of Poker bracelets ==
World Series of Poker bracelets
Year	Tournament	Prize (US$)
2013	$2,500 Omaha/Seven Card Stud Hi-Low 8-or Better	$216,988
2015	$50,000 The Poker Players Championship	$1,270,086
2023	$10,000 H.O.R.S.E. Championship	$422,747
2024P	$10,000 Paradise Pot-Limit Omaha	$393,250
2025	$10,000 Eight Game Mixed Championship	$422,421

A "P" following a year denotes bracelet(s) won during the World Series of Poker Paradise
