= Bill Klein (businessman) =

American businessman and poker player

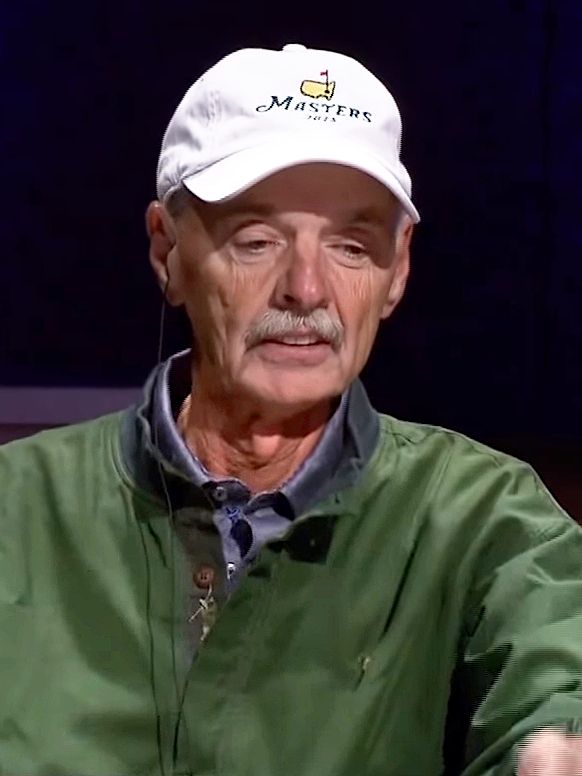
- Bill Klein in 2015
- Born: William G. Klein c. 1948

World Series of Poker
- Bracelet: None
- Final tables: 3
- Money finishes: 14
- Highest WSOP Main Event finish: 278th, 2023

World Poker Tour
- Title: None
- Final table: 1
- Money finishes: 3

William G. Klein (born c. 1948) is a retired American businessman and poker player from Laguna Hills, California.

== Poker ==
Klein's family was a part owner of a manufacturing company. They sold the company and he retired after being diagnosed with throat cancer. Klein entered the 2015 $111,111 One Drop High Roller and finished as the runner-up receiving a $2,465,522 payout. Klein donated his entire payout to two charities, the Orangewood Children’s Foundation and The Shea Center for Therapeutic Riding.

In 2010, Klein appeared in Season 7 of Game Show Network's High Stakes Poker. In 2015, Klein played in the $250,000 Aria Super High Roller cash game where he won a $458,500 pot after hero calling Antonio Esfandiari with J♣ 8♣ on a board of 7♦ 9♦ 8♦ 9♠ 3♥. Esfandiari held K♣ 5♣ for a stone cold bluff.

As of 2023, Klein's live tournament winnings exceed $6,100,000.

== Rankings ==
Klein was ranked 18th and 96th on the 2015 & 2016 Money Lists, respectively. Klein is currently ranked #180 on the Global Poker Index with his highest ranking being #158.
