= Joe McKeehen =

American poker player (born 1991)

Joseph McKeehen
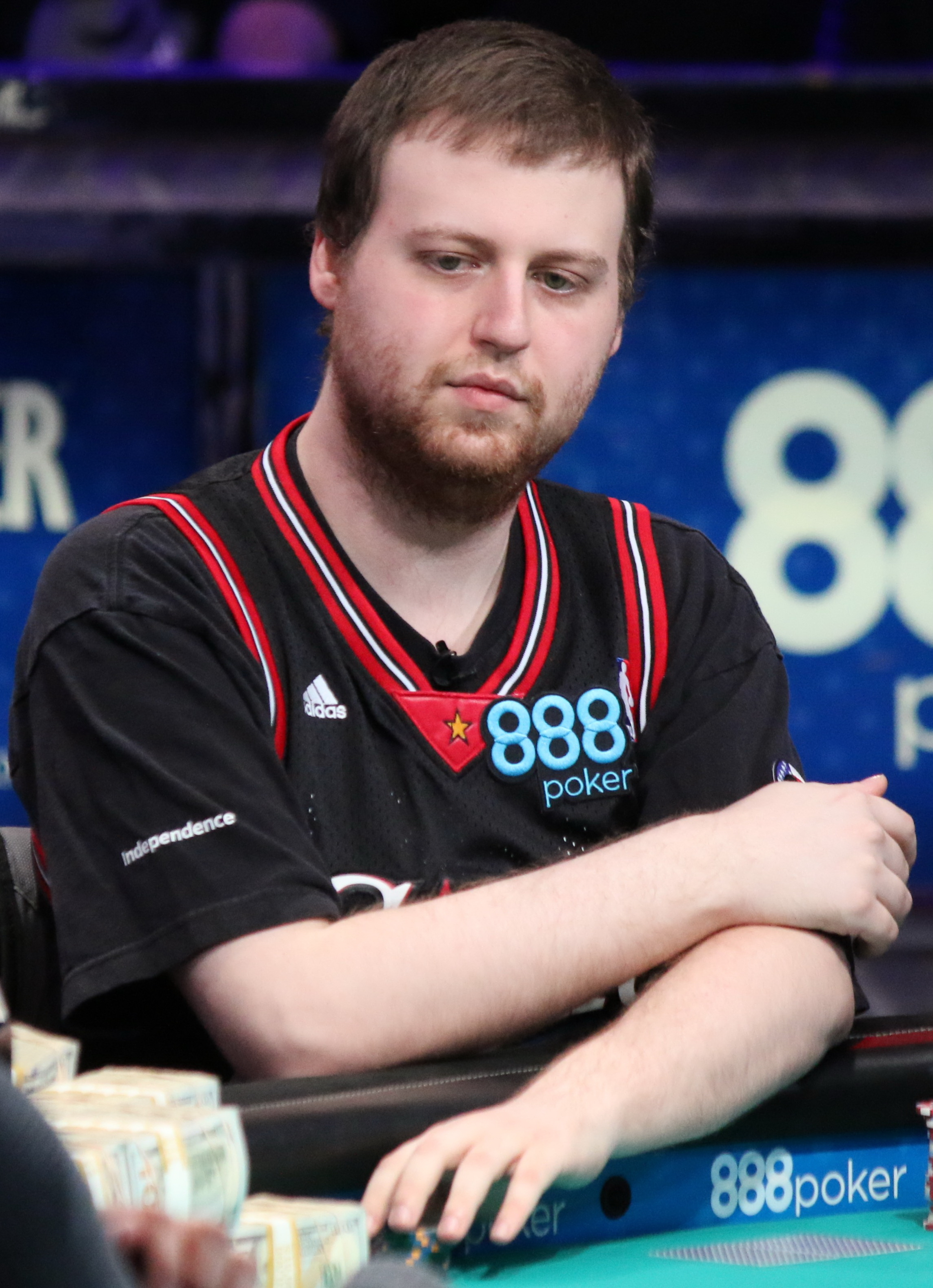
- McKeehen at the World Series of Poker in 2015
- Born: June 28, 1991 (age 35)

World Series of Poker
- Bracelets: 3
- Final tables: 22
- Money finishes: 91
- Highest WSOP Main Event finish: Winner, 2015

World Poker Tour
- Title: None
- Final tables: 5
- Money finishes: 26

European Poker Tour
- Money finish: 1

Joseph McKeehen (born June 28, 1991) is an American professional poker player and mind sports player from North Wales, Pennsylvania. In 2015 he won the World Series of Poker Main Event, earning $7,683,346.

== Early life and education ==
McKeehen was born in North Wales, Pennsylvania in 1991. He graduated from La Salle College High School, then attended Arcadia University, where he graduated with a degree in mathematics.

== Career ==
In 2010, McKeehan won the world championship in the board game Risk, the Risk Annual Classic.

McKeehen played poker online while being underaged until he could start playing live tournaments at the age of 18.

McKeehen's first poker title came in 2012, when he won a side event at the PokerStars Caribbean Adventure for $116,230. In March 2013, he won the WSOP Circuit event in Atlantic City, New Jersey, earning $174,147. That year he cashed in the WSOP Main Event for the first time, finishing in 489th place. Prior to the 2015 Main Event, McKeehen's largest cash came for a 2nd-place finish in the Monster Stack event at the 2014 World Series of Poker, where he earned $820,863.

At the 2015 WSOP Main Event, McKeehen made the November Nine with the chip lead and nearly a third of the chips in play. Throughout the final table, he never relinquished the chip lead and defeated Josh Beckley heads-up with A♥ 10♦ against 4♦ 4♣ for $7.683 million.

In January 2016, McKeehen finished runner-up to Bryn Kenney in the $100,000 Super High Roller event at the PokerStars Caribbean Adventure, earning $1,220,480.

In April 2016, McKeehen appeared on an episode of season 4 of Poker Night in America, on CBS Sports.

In July 2016, he finished 6th in WSOP $111,111 No Limit Hold'em High Roller for One Drop for $829,792. McKeehen captured his second WSOP bracelet in 2017, winning the $10,000 Limit Hold'em World Championship.

As of February 2026, McKeehen's total live tournament winnings exceeds $21,000,000. His 43 WSOP cashes account for $11,640,900 of those earnings.

== World Series of Poker bracelets ==
Year	Tournament	Prize (US$)
2015	$10,000 No Limit Hold'em Main Event	$7,683,346
2017	$10,000 Limit Hold'em Championship	$311,817
2020 O	$3,200 No Limit Hold'em High Roller	$352,985

An "O" following a year denotes bracelet(s) won during the World Series of Poker Online
