= Kevin MacPhee =

American poker player

- Born: 1980 (age 45–46); Coeur d'Alene, Idaho, U.S.

World Series of Poker
- Bracelets: 2
- Money finishes: 31
- Highest WSOP Main Event finish: 242nd, 2014

World Poker Tour
- Title: None
- Final table: 1
- Money finishes: 3

European Poker Tour
- Title: 1
- Final tables: 6
- Money finishes: 33

Kevin MacPhee (born 1980) is an American professional poker player. Born in Coeur d'Alene, Idaho, he currently resides in Las Vegas, Nevada. MacPhee competes in high-stakes poker tournaments worldwide.

== Early years and poker career ==
MacPhee was born in Coeur d'Alene, Idaho, and attended Lake City High School. He graduated from the University of Idaho in 2005 with a degree in general studies. MacPhee began playing poker during his college years as a hobby.

After graduating, MacPhee won the title of 2002 Magic: The Gathering Idaho State Champion.

In 2003, following Chris Moneymaker's victory in the World Series of Poker Main Event, MacPhee decided to transition from Magic: The Gathering to playing poker.

MacPhee has been playing poker professionally since April 2008, when he set the PokerStars Tournament Leader Board record. As of November 2024, he continues to travel and compete in live events.

== Achievements ==
In March 2010, MacPhee won the European Poker Tour (EPT) Berlin Main Event during Season 6, earning the title of tournament champion and a prize of €1,000,000. In an interview, MacPhee stated, "I am a luck-sack. (...) I ran extremely good and I had the nuts every time someone played back at me." Since 2010, he has achieved more than 20 notable cashes in EPT events.

MacPhee was the EPT Player's Choice Award Winner for 2010.

In June 2015, MacPhee won his first World Series of Poker bracelet by taking first place in Event #56: $5,000 Turbo No-Limit Hold'em, earning $490,900. In October 2015 he won his second bracelet, winning the World Series of Poker Europe Main Event for $1,001,577.

As of January 2025, his total live tournament winnings exceed $6,000,000.
