= 2017 World Series of Poker Europe results =

Poker tournament results

Below are the results for the 2017 World Series of Poker Europe, held from October 19-November 10 at King's Casino in Rozvadov, Czech Republic.

== Key ==
*	Elected to the Poker Hall of Fame
(#/#)	This denotes a bracelet winner. The first number is the number of bracelets won in 2017. The second number is the total number of bracelets won. Both numbers represent totals as of that point during the tournament.
Place	What place each player finished
Name	The player who made it to the final table
Prize (€)	The amount of money, in Euros (€), awarded for each finish at the event's final table

== Results ==
=== Event 1: €1,100 No Limit Hold'em Monster Stack ===
- 5-Day Event: October 19-23
- Number of buy-ins: 561
- Total Prize Pool: €538,280
- Number of Payouts: 84
- Winning Hand: 7♠ 7♥

Final Table
Place	Name	Prize
1st	Oleksandr Shcherbak (1/1)	€117,708
2nd	Viliyan Petleshkov	€72,747
3rd	Sergio Fernandez	€49,929
4th	Carlo Savinelli	€34,869
5th	Walter Treccarichi	€24,787
6th	Peter Bstieler	€17,940
7th	Serge Danis	€13,225
8th	Ismael Bojang	€9,934
9th	Ali Sameeian	€7,605

=== Event 2: €550 Pot Limit Omaha ===
- 3-Day Event: October 23-25
- Number of buy-ins: 523
- Total Prize Pool: €250,909
- Number of Payouts: 31
- Winning Hand: A♣ J♠ 10♦ 2♥

Final Table
Place	Name	Prize
1st	Andreas Klatt (1/1)	€56,400
2nd	Nico Ehlers	€34,860
3rd	Georgios Zisimopoulos	€23,979
4th	Theodoros Aidonopolos	€16,809
5th	Sergio Fernandez	€11,985
6th	Krzystof Magott	€8,700
7th	Michal Maryska	€6,433
8th	Vasile Stancu	€4,847

=== Event 3: €1,100 No Limit Hold'em Super Turbo Bounty ===
- 1-Day Event: October 25
- Number of buy-ins: 325
- Total Prize Pool: €214,337
- Number of Payouts: 49
- Winning Hand: 10♥ 7♥

Final Table
Place	Name	Prize
1st	Martin Kabrhel (1/1)	€53,557
2nd	Philipp Caranica	€33,094
3rd	Salvatore Camarda	€22,159
4th	Liran Twito	€15,168
5th	Yves Kupfermunz	€10,620
6th	John Racener (1/1)	€7,609
7th	Bernd Gleissner	€5,582
8th	Georgios Koliofotis	€4,195
9th	Viktor Kovachev	€3,232

=== Event 4: €1,650 No Limit Hold'em Six-Handed ===
- 3-Day Event: October 26-28
- Number of buy-ins: 240
- Total Prize Pool: €345,420
- Number of Payouts: 36
- Winning Hand: K♥ K♣

Final Table
Place	Name	Prize
1st	Theodore McQuilkin (1/1)	€88,043
2nd	Jan Bednar	€54,410
3rd	Andrej Desset	€35,714
4th	Jerry Odeen	€24,046
5th	Petr Setka	€16,618
6th	Maksym Shulga	€11,797

=== Event 5: €550 The Colossus No Limit Hold'em ===
- 7-Day Event: October 27-November 2
- Number of buy-ins: 4,115
- Total Prize Pool: €2,078,075
- Number of Payouts: 258
- Winning Hand: K♠ 8♠

Final Table
Place	Name	Prize
1st	Matous Skorepa (1/1)	€270,015
2nd	Florian Fuchs	€166,855
3rd	Jonathan Khalifa	€123,241
4th	Ivaylo Sivinov	€91,711
5th	Makarios Avramidis (0/1)	€68,771
6th	Roman Motovsky	€51,968
7th	Pascal Pflock	€39,576
8th	Nebojsa Ankucic	€30,376
9th	Gaetan Cauchy	€23,499

=== Event 6: €2,200 Pot Limit Omaha ===
- 3-Day Event: October 28-30
- Number of buy-ins: 191
- Total Prize Pool: €366,529
- Number of Payouts:
- Winning Hand: J♣ J♥ 6♦ 3♦

Final Table
Place	Name	Prize
1st	Lukas Zaskodny (1/1)	€93,677
2nd	Allen Kessler	€57,897
3rd	Krasimir Yankov	€40,353
4th	Pim van Holsteyn	€28,702
5th	Sergej Barbarez	€20,842
6th	Liran Twito	€15,458
7th	Georgios Koliofotis	€11,715
8th	Willm Engelke	€9,076

=== Event 7: €1,650 Pot Limit Omaha Hi-Lo 8 or Better ===
- 2-Day Event: October 31-November 1
- Number of buy-ins: 92
- Total Prize Pool: €132,411
- Number of Payouts: 14
- Winning Hand: K♥ K♦ 7♥ 2♥

Final Table
Place	Name	Prize
1st	Chris Ferguson (1/6)	€39,289
2nd	Stanislav Wright	€24,283
3rd	Eldert Soer	€16,607
4th	Artur Sojka	€11,693
5th	Rex Clinkscales	€8,483
6th	Divanshu Khurana	€6,347
7th	Dario Alioto (0/1)	€4,902
8th	Sebastian Langrock (1/1)	€3,913

=== Event 8: €1,111 Little One for One Drop No Limit Hold'em ===
- 4-Day Event: November 1-4
- Number of buy-ins: 868
- Total Prize Pool: €866,654
- Number of Payouts: 131
- Winning Hand: A♦ 10♣

Final Table
Place	Name	Prize
1st	Albert Hoekendijk (1/1)	€170,764
2nd	Thomas Hofmann	€105,532
3rd	Johannes Toebbe	€74,055
4th	Abdelhakim Zoufri	€52,703
5th	Oleh Haisiuk	€38,046
6th	Jonas Lauck	€27,865
7th	Serghei Lisiy	€20,710
8th	Artan Dedusha	€15,623
9th	Przemyslaw Klejnowski	€11,966

=== Event 9: €25,000 No Limit Hold'em High Roller ===
- 2-Day Event: November 1-2
- Number of buy-ins: 113
- Total Prize Pool: €2,673,545
- Number of Payouts: 17
- Winning Hand: A♠ J♥

Final Table
Place	Name	Prize
1st	Niall Farrell (1/1)	€745,287
2nd	Benjamin Pollak	€460,622
3rd	Claas Segebrecht	€321,863
4th	Ryan Riess (0/1)	€230,071
5th	Sylvain Loosli	€168,323
6th	Andrew Leathem	€126,113
7th	Stefan Schillhabel	€98,819
8th	Antoine Saout	€76,209

=== Event 10: €111,111 High Roller for One Drop No Limit Hold'em ===
- 3-Day Event: November 3-5
- Number of buy-ins: 132
- Total Prize Pool: €12,980,000
- Number of Payouts: 20
- Winning Hand: Q♦ 10♥

Final Table
Place	Name	Prize
1st	Dominik Nitsche (1/4)	€3,487,463
2nd	Andreas Eiler	€2,155,418
3rd	Mikita Badziakouski	€1,521,312
4th	Thomas Muehloecker	€1,096,206
5th	Steffen Sontheimer	€806,758
6th	Christoph Vogelsang	€606,694
7th	Ahadpur Khangah	€466,421
8th	Martin Kabrhel (1/1)	€366,762

=== Event 11: €10,350 No Limit Hold'em Main Event ===
- 7-Day Event: November 4-10
- Number of buy-ins: 529
- Total Prize Pool: €5,025,500
- Number of Payouts: 80
- Winning Hand: Q♥ 5♦

Final Table
Place	Name	Prize
1st	Marti Roca de Torres (1/1)	€1,115,207
2nd	Gianluca Speranza	€689,246
3rd	Mathijs Jonkers	€476,585
4th	Robert Bickley	€335,089
5th	Niall Farrell (1/1)	€239,639
6th	Maria Ho	€174,365
7th	Jack Salter	€129,121
8th	Luis Rodriguez	€97,344
