= 2022 World Series of Poker Europe results =

Below are the results of the 2022 World Series of Poker Europe, held from October 26-November 16 at King's Casino in Rozvadov, Czech Republic. There were 15 scheduled bracelet events.

== Key ==
*	Elected to the Poker Hall of Fame
(#/#)	This denotes a bracelet winner. The first number is the number of bracelets won in the 2019 WSOP. The second number is the total number of bracelets won. Both numbers represent totals as of that point during the tournament.
Place	What place each player at the final table finished
Name	The player who made it to the final table
Prize (€)	The amount of money awarded for each finish at the event's final table

== Results ==
=== Event #1: €350 No-Limit Hold'em Opener ===
- 7-Day Event: October 26-November 1
- Number of Entries: 2,454
- Total Prize Pool: €734,359
- Number of Payouts: 369
- Winning Hand: 5♦ 5♣

Final Table
Place	Name	Prize
1st	Fabio Peluso (1/1)	€95,670
2nd	Carlo Savinelli	€59,032
3rd	Stefan Vogt	€43,813
4th	Kevin Fluegel	€32,801
5th	Dennis Wilke	€24,773
6th	Gennaro Proscia	€18,875
7th	Miroslav Navratil	€14,509
8th	Simone Andrian	€11,254
9th	Gabriel Jansen Falcao Baleeiro	€8,809

=== Event #2: €550 Pot-Limit Omaha 8-Max ===
- 4-Day Event: October 29-November 1
- Number of Entries: 566
- Total Prize Pool: €268,850
- Number of Payouts: 86
- Winning Hand: K♥ 9♥ 6♥ 6♣

Final Table
Place	Name	Prize
1st	Helmut Phung (1/1)	€55,132
2nd	Martin Almaas	€34,051
3rd	Pascal Foged	€23,848
4th	Jakob Madsen	€16,987
5th	Gregory Sellam	€12,310
6th	Andreas Zampas	€9,078
7th	Bartlomiej Staszczak	€6,815
8th	Misel Bosancic	€5,210

=== Event #3: €1,350 Mini Main Event No Limit Hold'em ===
- 5-Day Event: October 31-November 4
- Number of Entries: 1,431
- Total Prize Pool: €1,631,340
- Number of Payouts: 215
- Winning Hand: K♣ 4♣

Final Table
Place	Name	Prize
1st	Ilija Savevski (1/1)	€245,319
2nd	Stefan Schoss	€151,554
3rd	Dennis Magro	€110,686
4th	Peter Kamaras	€81,716
5th	Jochen Kaiser	€60,990
6th	Yunho Choi	€46,027
7th	Braz Borges Fagundes Junior	€35,124
8th	Emanuele de Lemmi	€27,109
9th	Clement Cure	€21,162

=== Event #4: €2,000 Pot-Limit Omaha ===
- 2-Day Event: November 1-2
- Number of Entries: 221
- Total Prize Pool: €423,557
- Number of Payouts: 34
- Winning Hand: A♣ K♦ Q♠ 4♣

Final Table
Place	Name	Prize
1st	Anson Tsang (1/2)	€95,461
2nd	Tomasz Gluszko	€58,988
3rd	Shawn Stroke	€40,232
4th	Dario Alioto (0/1)	€28,162
5th	Oswin Ziegelbecker	€20,245
6th	Vivian Saliba	€14,959
7th	Farid Jattin	€11,368
8th	Pavel Izotov	€8,893
9th	Jorryt van Hoof	€7,168

=== Event #5: €550 No-Limit Hold'em Colossus ===
- 5-Day Event: November 3-7
- Number of Entries: 2,982
- Total Prize Pool: €1,416,450
- Number of Payouts: 360
- Winning Hand: Q♦ 7♥

Final Table
Place	Name	Prize
1st	Lubos Laska (1/1)	€170,568
2nd	Nino Junior Pansier	€105,241
3rd	De Han Kim	€79,495
4th	Demetrio Caminita	€60,442
5th	Florin Adrian Bilan	€46,262
6th	Patrik Zidek	€35,644
7th	Demetrio Caminita	€27,647
8th	Ismet Oral	€21,590
9th	Jason Wheeler	€16,975

=== Event #6: €5,000 Pot-Limit Omaha ===
- 2-Day Event: November 6-7
- Number of Entries: 223
- Total Prize Pool: €1,006,287
- Number of Payouts: 34
- Winning Hand: J♦ 5♥ 3♦ 2♠

Final Table
Place	Name	Prize
1st	Roman Verenko (1/1)	€247,288
2nd	Omar Eljach	€152,827
3rd	Eran Carmi	€104,234
4th	Gergo Nagy	€72,962
5th	Thomer Pidun	€52,453
6th	Oleksii Kovalchuk (0/2)	€38,756
7th	Michael Magalashvili	€29,453
8th	Roland Israelashvili	€23,042
9th	Dimitrios Michailidis	€18,572

=== Event #7: €1,650 No-Limit Hold'em 6-Handed ===
- 2-Day Event: November 7-8
- Number of Entries: 413
- Total Prize Pool: €588,525
- Number of Payouts: 62
- Winning Hand: 2♥ 2♠

Final Table
Place	Name	Prize
1st	Max Kruse (1/1)	€134,152
2nd	Dorian Melchers	€87,059
3rd	Farid Jattin	€63,874
4th	Leonid Yanovski	€38,010
5th	Nikola Orhan Sen	€27,482
6th	Jose Ignacio Barbero (0/1)	€20,236
7th	Jonathan Khalifa	€15,180
8th	Mario Colavita	€11,606
9th	Giorgio Montebelli	€9,046

=== Event #8: €25,000 No-Limit Hold'em Platinum High Roller ===
- 2-Day Event: November 7-8
- Number of Entries: 67
- Total Prize Pool: €1,565,790
- Number of Payouts: 11
- Winning Hand: A♣ 3♥

Final Table
Place	Name	Prize
1st	Paul Phua (1/1)	€482,433
2nd	Gab Yong Kim	€298,163
3rd	Shaun Deeb (0/5)	€205,566
4th	Daniel Negreanu* (0/6)	€146,370
5th	Julien Martini (0/4)	€107,752
6th	Ben Heath (0/1)	€82,104
7th	Wayne Heung	€64,835
8th	Eelis Parssinen (0/1)	€53,129
9th	Espen Jorstad (0/1)	€45,242

=== Event #9: €2,200 Short Deck ===
- 2-Day Event: November 8-9
- Number of Entries: 91
- Total Prize Pool: €172,900
- Number of Payouts: 14
- Winning Hand: A♥ 10♥

Final Table
Place	Name	Prize
1st	Emil Bise (1/2)	€49,521
2nd	Jakub Koleckar	€30,602
3rd	Felipe Ramos	€21,416
4th	Helmut Phung (1/1)	€15,351
5th	Giuliano Bandinelli	€11,278
6th	Simeon Tsonev	€8,498
7th	Tom Orpaz	€6,570

=== Event #10: €2,000 8-Game Mix ===
- 2-Day Event: November 9-10
- Number of Entries: 102
- Total Prize Pool: €179,265
- Number of Payouts: 16
- Winning Hand: J♣ 6♣ (Limit Hold'em)

Final Table
Place	Name	Prize
1st	Thomer Pidun (1/1)	€49,245
2nd	Oleksii Kovalchuk (0/2)	€30,430
3rd	Philipp Krieger	€21,311
4th	Julien Sitbon	€15,299
5th	Dario Alioto (0/1)	€11,266
6th	Jose Ignacio Barbero (0/1)	€8,516
7th	Allen Kessler	€6,612

=== Event #11: €50,000 No-Limit Hold'em Diamond High Roller ===
- 2-Day Event: November 10-11
- Number of Entries: 45
- Total Prize Pool: €2,116,125
- Number of Payouts: 7
- Winning Hand: K♥ Q♦

Final Table
Place	Name	Prize
1st	Orpen Kisacikoglu (1/1)	€748,106
2nd	Sam Grafton	€462,363
3rd	Shaun Deeb (0/5)	€313,919
4th	Nick Petrangelo (0/2)	€220,045
5th	Timothy Adams (0/1)	€159,413
6th	Daniel Pidun	€119,492
7th	Daniel Dvoress	€92,787

=== Event #12: €10,350 No-Limit Hold'em Main Event ===
- 5-Day Event: November 11-15
- Number of Entries: 763
- Total Prize Pool: €7,248,500
- Number of Payouts: 115
- Winning Hand: Q♠ Q♦

Final Table
Place	Name	Prize
1st	Omar Eljach (1/1)	€1,380,128
2nd	Jonathan Pastore	€852,949
3rd	Shaun Deeb (0/5)	€607,531
4th	Vladas Tamasauskas	€438,978
5th	Paul Adrian Covaciu	€321,838
6th	Armin Rezaei	€239,466
7th	Barny Boatman (0/2)	€180,867
8th	Alexandre Reard (0/1)	€138,702
9th	Timothy Adams (0/1)	€108,024

=== Event #13: €1,650 Pot-Limit Omaha / No-Limit Hold'em Mixed ===
- 2-Day Event: November 13-14
- Number of Entries: 251
- Total Prize Pool: €357,675
- Number of Payouts: 38
- Winning Hand: A♣ 10♣ 9♣ 9♠ (Pot-Limit Omaha)

Final Table
Place	Name	Prize
1st	Yair van Ruiten (1/1)	€85,405
2nd	Ioannis Angelou Konstas	€52,772
3rd	Christian Polkow	€36,531
4th	Ran Ilani	€25,872
5th	Marco Di Persio	€18,756
6th	Rutger Johan Bosch	€13,927
7th	Steve Galletti	€10,598
8th	Manig Loeser (0/2)	€8,270
9th	Oleksii Kovalchuk (0/2)	€6,622

=== Event #14: €1,100 No-Limit Hold'em Bounty Hunter ===
- 1-Day Event: November 14
- Number of Entries: 436
- Total Prize Pool: €283,400
- Number of Payouts: 66
- Winning Hand: K♣ J♣

Final Table
Place	Name	Prize
1st	Karim Maekelberg (1/1)	€62,111
2nd	Theo Schmitt	€38,375
3rd	Brian Cornell	€26,542
4th	Rolando Camardese	€18,715
5th	Dinesh Alt	€13,458
6th	Aaron Duczak	€9,873
7th	Antonino Calabro	€7,393
8th	Hossein Ensan (0/1)	€5,653
9th	Balakrishna Patur	€4,415

=== Event #15: €1,000 No-Limit Hold'em Turbo Freezeout ===
- 1-Day Event: November 15
- Number of Entries: 211
- Total Prize Pool: €182,409
- Number of Payouts: 32
- Winning Hand: A♥ Q♠

Final Table
Place	Name	Prize
1st	Andriy Lyubovetskiy (1/2)	€45,606
2nd	Oleksii Kovalchuk (0/2)	€28,178
3rd	Mehdi Chaoui Roqai	€19,304
4th	Edolo Ghirelli	€13,565
5th	Benjamin Stiefel	€9,783
6th	Johan Guilbert	€7,246
7th	Martin Kabrhel (0/2)	€5,517
8th	Thore Kunze	€4,320
9th	Fabio Peluso	€3,482
