= 2017 Poker Masters =

Series of poker tournaments

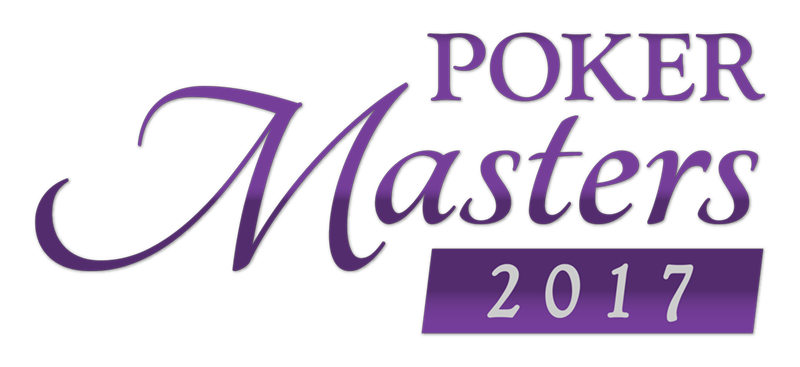
- Venue: ARIA Resort & Casino
- Location: Las Vegas, Nevada
- Dates: September 13-20, 2017

Champion
- (Germany) Steffen Sontheimer (Purple Jacket winner); (Germany) Steffen Sontheimer (Main Event winner)

The 2017 Poker Masters was the inaugural season of the Poker Masters. It took place from September 13-20, 2017, at ARIA Resort & Casino in Las Vegas, Nevada. The event was sponsored by Poker Central, and every final table was streamed on PokerGO. There were five No-Limit Hold'em events on the schedule with the first four events being a $50,000 buy-in, while the Main Event was a $100,000 buy-in.

The Main Event was won by Germany's Steffen Sontheimer, and he also won the Poker Masters Purple Jacket for accumulating the most winnings during the series.

== Schedule ==
The schedule for the 2017 Poker Masters featured only No-Limit Hold'em events. The first four events were $50,000 buy-ins and lasted two days with the first day ending once the final table was down to seven players. Those players returned the next day to resume play with the action streamed on PokerGO. The Main Event was a $100,000 buy-in and played out over three days. All three days were streamed on PokerGO.

2017 Poker Masters
#	Event	Entrants	Prize Pool (US$)	Winner	Winning Hand	Prize (US$)	Runner-up	Losing hand	Results
1	$50,000 No-Limit Hold'em	51	$2,550,000	(United States) Nick Schulman	A♠ K♥	$918,000	(United States) Matthew Hyman	A♦ 8♦	Results
2	$50,000 No-Limit Hold'em	50	$2,500,000	(Germany) Steffen Sontheimer	A♣ J♥	$900,000	(Germany) Fedor Holz	K♣ J♥	Results
3	$50,000 No-Limit Hold'em	48	$2,400,000	(United States) Bryn Kenney	K♥ J♦	$960,000	(United States) Erik Seidel	3♦ 2♠	Results
4	$50,000 No-Limit Hold'em	39	$1,950,000	(United States) Brandon Adams	9♦ 7♦	$819,000	(United States) Doug Polk	5♦ 4♦	Results
5	$100,000 No-Limit Hold'em Main Event	36	$3,600,000	(Germany) Steffen Sontheimer	Q♥ Q♦	$1,512,000	(Germany) Christian Christner	2♦ 2♣	Results

== Purple Jacket standings ==
The 2017 Poker Masters awarded the Purple Jacket to the player that accumulated the most winnings during the series. Germany's Steffen Sontheimer won two events, and cashed four times on his way to accumulating $2,733,000 in winnings to be awarded the inaugural Purple Jacket.

Poker Masters Purple Jacket Standings
Rank	Name	Earnings
1	(Germany) Steffen Sontheimer	$2,733,000
2	(United States) Bryn Kenney	$1,085,000
3	(Germany) Fedor Holz	$1,054,000
4	(Germany) Christian Christner	$1,039,000
5	(United States) Nick Schulman	$918,000
6	(United States) Brandon Adams	$819,000
7	(United States) Doug Polk	$612,000
8	(United States) Erik Seidel	$576,000
9	(United States) Matthew Hyman	$561,000
10	(Germany) Stefan Schillhabel	$486,000

== Results ==
=== Event #1: $50,000 No-Limit Hold'em ===
- 2-Day Event: September 13-14, 2017
- Number of Entrants: 51
- Total Prize Pool: $2,550,000
- Number of Payouts: 8
- Winning Hand: A♠ K♥

Event #1 Results
Place	Name	Prize
1st	(United States) Nick Schulman	$918,000
2nd	(United States) Matthew Hyman	$561,000
3rd	(Germany) Stefan Schillhabel	$306,000
4th	(Germany) Steffen Sontheimer	$204,000
5th	(Germany) Dominik Nitsche	$178,500
6th	(Germany) Koray Aldemir	$153,000
7th	(Spain) Adrian Mateos	$127,500
8th	(Canada) Daniel Negreanu	$102,000

=== Event #2: $50,000 No-Limit Hold'em ===
- 2-Day Event: September 14-15, 2017
- Number of Entrants: 50
- Total Prize Pool: $2,500,000
- Number of Payouts: 8
- Winning Hand: A♣ J♥

Event #2 Results
Place	Name	Prize
1st	(Germany) Steffen Sontheimer	$900,000
2nd	(Germany) Fedor Holz	$550,000
3rd	(United States) Tom Marchese	$300,000
4th	(United States) Phil Hellmuth	$200,000
5th	(Germany) Christian Christner	$175,000
6th	(Spain) Adrian Mateos	$150,000
7th	(United States) Bryn Kenney	$125,000
8th	(United States) Dan Shak	$100,000

=== Event #3: $50,000 No-Limit Hold'em ===
- 2-Day Event: September 15-16, 2017
- Number of Entrants: 48
- Total Prize Pool: $2,400,000
- Number of Payouts: 7
- Winning Hand: A♣ J♥

Event #3 Results
Place	Name	Prize
1st	(United States) Bryn Kenney	$960,000
2nd	(United States) Erik Seidel	$576,000
3rd	(United States) Jake Schindler	$312,000
4th	(United States) Dan Smith	$192,000
5th	(United States) Doug Polk	$144,000
6th	(United States) Cary Katz	$120,000
7th	(Spain) Sergio Aido	$96,000

=== Event #4: $50,000 No-Limit Hold'em ===
- 2-Day Event: September 16-17, 2017
- Number of Entrants: 39
- Total Prize Pool: $1,950,000
- Number of Payouts: 6
- Winning Hand: 9♦ 7♦

Event #4 Results
Place	Name	Prize
1st	(United States) Brandon Adams	$819,000
2nd	(United States) Doug Polk	$468,000
3rd	(United States) David Peters	$273,000
4th	(United States) Justin Bonomo	$175,500
5th	(Germany) Steffen Sontheimer	$117,000
6th	(United States) Jake Schindler	$97,500

=== Event #5: $100,000 No-Limit Hold'em Main Event ===
- 3-Day Event: September 18-20, 2017
- Number of Entrants: 36
- Total Prize Pool: $3,600,000
- Number of Payouts: 6
- Winning Hand: Q♥ Q♦

Event #5 Results
Place	Name	Prize
1st	(Germany) Steffen Sontheimer	$1,512,000
2nd	(Germany) Christian Christner	$864,000
3rd	(Germany) Fedor Holz	$504,000
4th	(United States) Seth Davies	$324,000
5th	(United States) Justin Bonomo	$216,000
6th	(Germany) Stefan Schillhabel	$180,000
