= 2021 World Series of Poker Europe results =

Below are the results of the 2021 World Series of Poker Europe, held from November 19-December 8 at King's Casino in Rozvadov, Czech Republic. There are 15 scheduled bracelet events.

== Key ==
| * | Elected to the Poker Hall of Fame |
| (#/#) | This denotes a bracelet winner. The first number is the number of bracelets won in the 2019 WSOP. The second number is the total number of bracelets won. Both numbers represent totals as of that point during the tournament. |
| Place | What place each player at the final table finished |
| Name | The player who made it to the final table |
| Prize (€) | The amount of money awarded for each finish at the event's final table |

== Results ==
=== Event #1: €350 No-Limit Hold'em Opener ===
- 3-Day Event: November 19-21
- Number of Entries: 1,789
- Total Prize Pool: €535,358
- Number of Payouts: 269
- Winning Hand: A♦ A♠

Final Table
| Place | Name | Prize |
|---|---|---|
| 1st | Antonello Ferraiuolo (1/1) | €87,920 |
| 2nd | Levent Efe | €58,289 |
| 3rd | Ion Tabacaru | €45,579 |
| 4th | Narcis Gabriel Nedulcu | €26,157 |
| 5th | Logi Thor Laxdal | €19,623 |
| 6th | Roberto Bizaj | €14,876 |
| 7th | Gal Aviv | €11,397 |
| 8th | Marius Alexandru Gicovanu | €8,826 |
| 9th | Andy Schlegel | €6,909 |

=== Event #2: €550 Pot-Limit Omaha 8-Max ===
- 3-Day Event: November 20-22
- Number of Entries: 623
- Total Prize Pool: €295,925
- Number of Payouts: 91
- Winning Hand: A♠ A♦ Q♦ 3♦

Final Table
| Place | Name | Prize |
|---|---|---|
| 1st | Bjorn Verbakel (1/1) | €60,253 |
| 2nd | Zhao Feng | €36,617 |
| 3rd | Ken Beckers | €25,530 |
| 4th | Richard Toth | €18,111 |
| 5th | Alfredo Vega Meister | €13,078 |
| 6th | Tobias Peters | €9,615 |
| 7th | Mikkel Frimer Plum | €7,200 |
| 8th | Martin Kabrhel (0/2) | €5,494 |

=== Event #3: €1,350 Mini Main Event No Limit Hold'em ===
- 3-Day Event: November 22-24
- Number of Entries: 1,397
- Total Prize Pool: €1,592,580
- Number of Payouts: 211
- Winning Hand: K♠ 9♠

Final Table
| Place | Name | Prize |
|---|---|---|
| 1st | Emil Bise (1/1) | €260,525 |
| 2nd | Marius Alexandru Gicovanu | €162,961 |
| 3rd | Rolf Van Brug | €122,735 |
| 4th | Alessandro Pichierri | €92,996 |
| 5th | David Sinclair | €71,845 |
| 6th | Ciro Perna | €56,654 |
| 7th | Vivian Saliba | €35,288 |
| 8th | Pablo Finini | €27,223 |
| 9th | Gerardo Giammugnani | €21,261 |

=== Event #4: €2,000 Pot-Limit Omaha ===
- 2-Day Event: November 23-24
- Number of Entries: 241
- Total Prize Pool: €423,557
- Number of Payouts: 37
- Winning Hand: K♠ Q♠ 10♣ 9♣

Final Table
| Place | Name | Prize |
|---|---|---|
| 1st | Samuel Stranak (1/1) | €101,764 |
| 2nd | Alan Sabo | €62,894 |
| 3rd | Ian Bradley | €44,044 |
| 4th | Vasil Medarov | €31,484 |
| 5th | Amir Mozaffarian | €22,982 |
| 6th | Krasimir Yankov | €17,140 |
| 7th | Stanislav Parkhomenko | €13,065 |
| 8th | Ermanno Di Nicola | €10,185 |
| 9th | Andriy Lyubovetskiy | €8,123 |

=== Event #5: €550 No-Limit Hold'em Colossus ===
- 1-Day Event: November 24
- Number of Entries: 2,478
- Total Prize Pool: €1,177,050
- Number of Payouts: 355
- Winning Hand: A♣ 9♣

Final Table
| Place | Name | Prize |
|---|---|---|
| 1st | Edmond Jahjaga (1/1) | €158,125 |
| 2nd | Riadh Farhat | €101,668 |
| 3rd | Matteo Calzoni | €77,946 |
| 4th | Andrea Ricci | €60,856 |
| 5th | Roman Krahula | €48,445 |
| 6th | Zlatin Nedyalkov Penev | €40,337 |
| 7th | Aurelio Reggi | €32,652 |
| 8th | Ntamaris Fotios Konstantinos | €27,664 |
| 9th | Gabriele Re | €24,823 |

=== Event #6: €1,650 Pot-Limit Omaha / No-Limit Hold'em Mixed ===
- 3-Day Event: November 25-27
- Number of Entries: 339
- Total Prize Pool: €483,075
- Number of Payouts: 51
- Winning Hand: K♠ K♥ J♠ 3♣

Final Table
| Place | Name | Prize |
|---|---|---|
| 1st | Antoine Vranken (1/1) | €113,000 |
| 2nd | Moncef Karoui | €69,831 |
| 3rd | Carter Newhof | €47,286 |
| 4th | Claudio Di Giacomo | €32,787 |
| 5th | Stanislav Koleno | €23,296 |
| 6th | Mikkel Frimer Plum | €16,971 |
| 7th | Manuel Fritz | €12,685 |
| 8th | Fahredin Mustafov | €9,734 |
| 9th | Julien Sitbon | €7,675 |

=== Event #7: €5,000 Pot-Limit Omaha ===
- 2-Day Event: November 27-28
- Number of Entries: 184
- Total Prize Pool: €830,300
- Number of Payouts: 28
- Winning Hand: A♠ K♥ Q♠ 5♠

Final Table
| Place | Name | Prize |
|---|---|---|
| 1st | Maximilian Klostermeier (1/2) | €204,010 |
| 2nd | Joni Jouhkimainen | €126,091 |
| 3rd | Ermanno Di Nicola | €88,520 |
| 4th | Armando Davanzo | €63,613 |
| 5th | Nikola Minkov | €46,821 |
| 6th | Peter Jaroslav | €35,317 |
| 7th | Vasil Medarov | €27,317 |
| 8th | Veselin Karakitukov | €21,681 |
| 9th | Bjorn Verbakel | €17,669 |

=== Event #8: €2,500 Short Deck ===
- 2-Day Event: November 28-29
- Number of Entries: 98
- Total Prize Pool: €830,300
- Number of Payouts: 15
- Winning Hand: A♣ K♣

Final Table
| Place | Name | Prize |
|---|---|---|
| 1st | Julien Martini (1/2) | €60,009 |
| 2nd | Philipp Schwab | €37,087 |
| 3rd | Emil Base (1/1) | €26,182 |
| 4th | Reto Herrmann | €18,856 |
| 5th | Brian Cornell | €13,858 |
| 6th | Christian Stratmeyer | €10,399 |
| 7th | Nicolas Bokowski | €7,971 |

=== Event #9: €1,100 No-Limit Hold'em Turbo Bounty Hunter ===
- 2-Day Event: November 29-30
- Number of Entries: 604
- Total Prize Pool: €392,600
- Number of Payouts: 91
- Winning Hand: 9♥ 7♥

Final Table
| Place | Name | Prize |
|---|---|---|
| 1st | Sergiu Covrig (1/1) | €79,282 |
| 2nd | Michael Oliver Strauch | €49,006 |
| 3rd | Tim Novotny | €34,452 |
| 4th | Pablo Finini | €24,627 |
| 5th | Romain Le Neillon | €17,905 |
| 6th | Nicola D'Anselmo | €13,243 |
| 7th | Mykhailo Sezonenko | €9,969 |
| 8th | Pierre Trauer | €7,639 |
| 9th | Nebojsa Ankucic | €5,961 |

=== Event #10: €25,000 Platinum No-Limit Hold'em High Roller ===
- 3-Day Event: November 29-December 1
- Number of Entries: 72
- Total Prize Pool: €1,682,640
- Number of Payouts: 11
- Winning Hand: K♥ 5♠

Final Table
| Place | Name | Prize |
|---|---|---|
| 1st | Andriy Lyubovetskiy (1/1) | €518,430 |
| 2nd | Joni Jouhkimainen | €320,415 |
| 3rd | Tom Bedell | €220,905 |
| 4th | Martin Kabrhel (0/2) | €157,295 |
| 5th | Jordan Westmorland | €115,795 |
| 6th | Didier Rabl | €88,230 |
| 7th | Ole Schemion | €69,675 |
| 8th | Thomer Pidun | €57,095 |
| 9th | Fahredin Mustafov | €48,620 |

=== Event #11: €1,650 No-Limit Hold'em 6-Max ===
- 3-Day Event: November 30-December 2
- Number of Entries: 535
- Total Prize Pool: €762,375
- Number of Payouts: 81
- Winning Hand: A♠ J♦

Final Table
| Place | Name | Prize |
|---|---|---|
| 1st | Simone Andrian (1/1) | €158,616 |
| 2nd | Josef Snejberg | €98,020 |
| 3rd | Norbert Baumgartner | €65,540 |
| 4th | Zlatin Nedyalkov Penev | €44,800 |
| 5th | Jan Bednar | €31,312 |
| 6th | Tony Tran | €22,410 |

=== Event #12: €2,000 8-Game Mix ===
- 2-Day Event: December 1-2
- Number of Entries: 61
- Total Prize Pool: €107,207
- Number of Payouts: 10
- Winning Hand: 8♠ 7♥ (Limit Hold'em)

Final Table
| Place | Name | Prize |
|---|---|---|
| 1st | Julien Martini (2/3) | €33,910 |
| 2nd | Ole Schemion (1/1) | €20,960 |
| 3rd | Nicolas Bokowski | €14,290 |
| 4th | Mikkel Plum | €10,085 |
| 5th | Symeon Alexandridis | €7,390 |
| 6th | Artan Dedusha | €5,620 |
| 7th | Grzegorz Ireneusz Wyraz | €4,450 |

=== Event #13: €10,000 No-Limit Hold'em 6-max ===
- 3-Day Event: December 2-4
- Number of Entries: 73
- Total Prize Pool: €672,695
- Number of Payouts: 11
- Winning Hand: K♦ 10♥

Final Table
| Place | Name | Prize |
|---|---|---|
| 1st | Romain Le Dantec (1/1) | €207,267 |
| 2nd | Sonny Franco | €128,096 |
| 3rd | Jakob Miegel | €88,223 |
| 4th | Bertrand Grospellier (0/2) | €62,574 |
| 5th | Sirzat Hissou | €45,747 |
| 6th | Christopher Puetz | €34,507 |

=== Event #14: €10,350 No-Limit Hold'em Main Event ===
- 5-Day Event: December 3-8
- Number of Entries: 688
- Total Prize Pool: €6,536,000
- Number of Payouts: 104
- Winning Hand: A♦ 8♠

Final Table
| Place | Name | Prize |
|---|---|---|
| 1st | Josef Gulas Jr (1/1) | €1,276,712 |
| 2nd | Johan Guilbert | €789,031 |
| 3rd | Alexander Tkatschew | €558,505 |
| 4th | Athanasios Kidas | €401,344 |
| 5th | Stanislav Koleno | €292,862 |
| 6th | Aleksandar Trajkovski | €217,054 |
| 7th | Thomas Denie | €163,434 |
| 8th | Ilija Savevski | €125,052 |
| 9th | Brian Kamphorst | €97,260 |

=== Event #15: €3,000 No-Limit Hold'em Closer ===
- 1-Day Event: December 6
- Number of Entries: 228
- Total Prize Pool: €606,480
- Number of Payouts: 35
- Winning Hand: 10♣ 9♠

Final Table
| Place | Name | Prize |
|---|---|---|
| 1st | Alessandro Pichierri (1/1) | €148,008 |
| 2nd | Timo Kamphues | €91,568 |
| 3rd | Manuel Fischer | €62,534 |
| 4th | Claudio Di Giacomo | €43,876 |
| 5th | Romain Locquet | €31,616 |
| 6th | Thomer Pidun | €23,414 |
| 7th | Milos Petakovic | €17,834 |
| 8th | Anil Ataoglu | €13,983 |
| 9th | Georgios Tsouloftas | €11,295 |
