= 2021 World Series of Poker Europe =

Series of poker tournaments

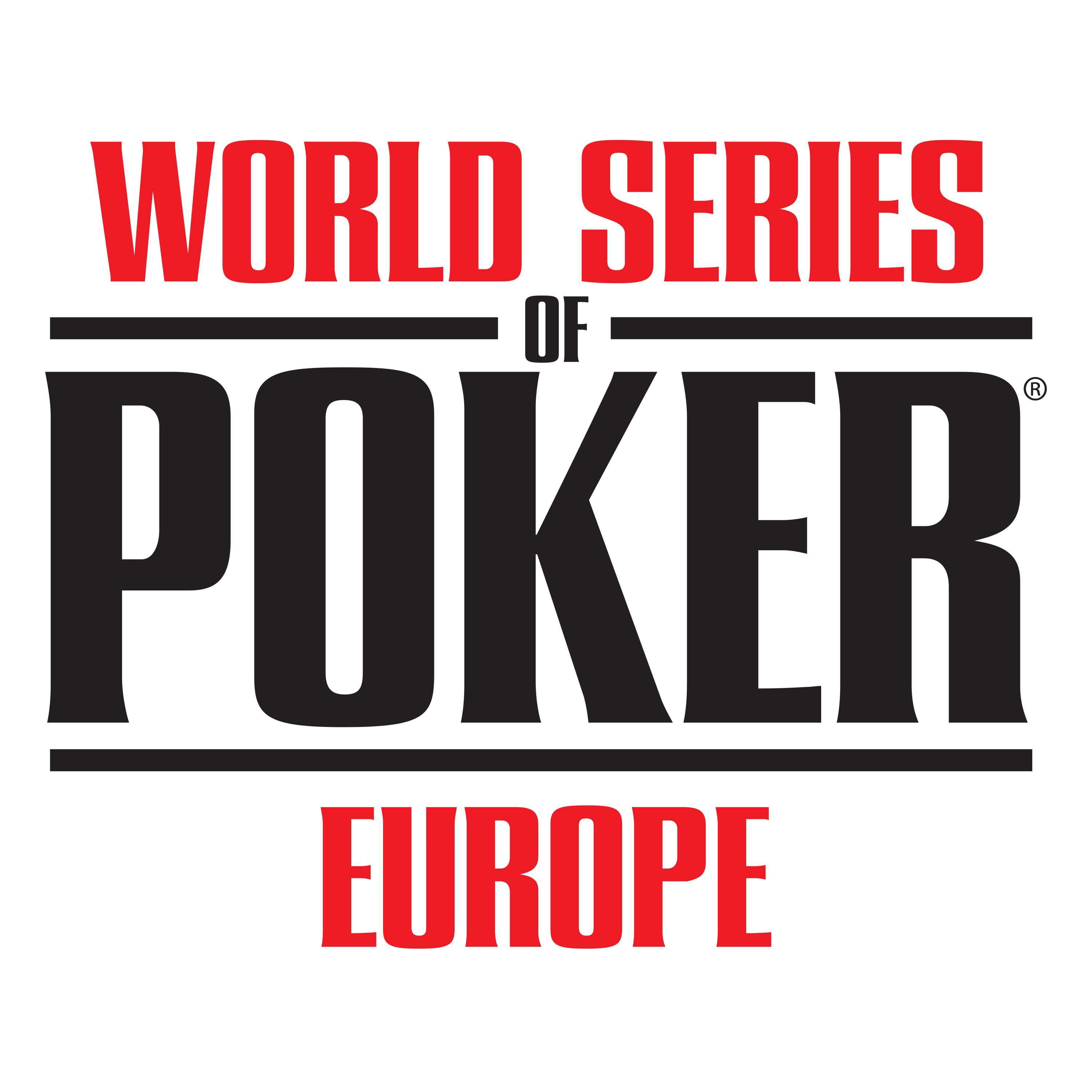
- Location: King's Casino, Rozvadov, Czech Republic
- Dates: 19 November – 8 December

Champion
- (Czech Republic) Josef Gulas

The 2021 World Series of Poker Europe was the 12th edition of the series of poker tournaments. It took place from 19 November – 8 December at King's Casino in Rozvadov, Czech Republic and featured 15 WSOP bracelet events.

On 25 November, the Czech government declared a state of emergency as a result of rising COVID-19 cases in the country. The WSOP Europe proceeded as planned, but all events had to conclude by 10 p.m. local time to comply with curfew restrictions.

== Event schedule ==
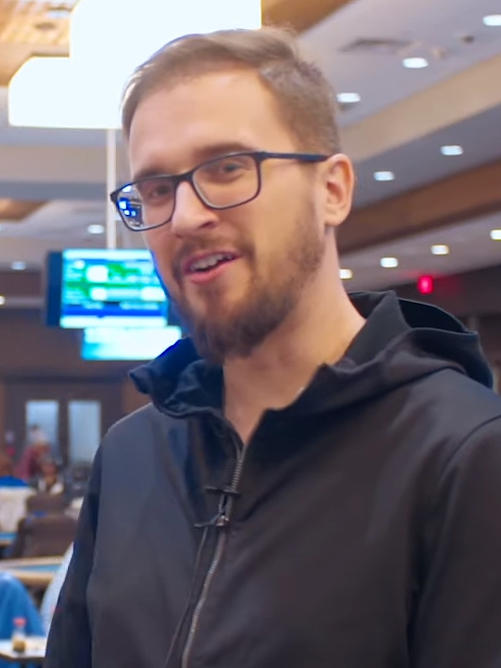
Julien Martini won two events, becoming the first Frenchman with three WSOP bracelets

| # | Event | Entrants | Winner | Prize | Runner-up | Results |
|---|---|---|---|---|---|---|
| 1 | €350 No-Limit Hold'em Opener | 1,789 | (Italy) Antonello Ferraiuolo (1/1) | €87,920 | (Germany) Levent Efe | Results |
| 2 | €550 Pot-Limit Omaha 8-Max | 623 | (Netherlands) Bjorn Verbakel (1/1) | €60,253 | (Singapore) Feng Zhao | Results |
| 3 | €1,350 Mini Main Event | 1,397 | (Switzerland) Emil Bise (1/1) | €260,525 | (Romania) Marius Gicovanu | Results |
| 4 | €2,000 Pot-Limit Omaha | 241 | (Slovakia) Samuel Stranak (1/1) | €101,764 | (Slovakia) Alan Sabo | Results |
| 5 | €550 No-Limit Hold'em Colossus | 2,478 | (Kosovo) Edmond Jahjaga (1/1) | €158,125 | (France) Riadh Farhat | Results |
| 6 | €1,650 PLO/NLH Mixed | 339 | (Netherlands) Antoine Vranken (1/1) | €113,000 | (Tunisia) Moncef Karoui | Results |
| 7 | €5,000 Pot-Limit Omaha | 184 | (Denmark) Maximilian Klostermeier (1/2) | €204,010 | (Finland) Joni Jouhkimainen | Results |
| 8 | €2,500 Short Deck | 98 | (France) Julien Martini (1/2) | €60,009 | (Germany) Philipp Schwab | Results |
| 9 | €1,100 No-Limit Hold'em Turbo Bounty Hunter | 604 | (Romania) Sergiu Covrig (1/1) | €79,282 | (Germany) Michael Strauch | Results |
| 10 | €25,000 Platinum High Roller | 72 | (Ukraine) Andriy Lyubovetskiy (1/1) | €518,430 | (Finland) Joni Jouhkimainen | Results |
| 11 | €1,650 No-Limit Hold'em 6-Max | 535 | (Italy) Simone Andrian (1/1) | €158,616 | (Czech Republic) Josef Snejberg | Results |
| 12 | €2,000 8-Game Mix | 61 | (France) Julien Martini (2/3) | €33,910 | (Germany) Ole Schemion (1/1) | Results |
| 13 | €10,000 No-Limit Hold'em 6-Max | 73 | (France) Romain Le Dantec (1/1) | €207,267 | (France) Sonny Franco | Results |
| 14 | €10,350 No-Limit Hold'em Main Event | 688 | (Czech Republic) Josef Gulas (1/1) | €1,276,712 | (France) Johan Guilbert | Results |
| 15 | €3,000 No-Limit Hold'em Closer | 228 | (Italy) Alessandro Pichierri (1/1) | €148,008 | (Germany) Timo Kamphues | Results |

== Main Event ==
The €10,350 No-Limit Hold'em Main Event began on 3 December with the first of two starting flights. The event drew 688 entries, the largest Main Event field in WSOP Europe history. The final table was played on 8 December, with the winner earning €1,276,712.

=== Final Table ===
| Name | Number of chips (percentage of total) | WSOP Bracelets | WSOP Cashes* | WSOP Earnings* |
|---|---|---|---|---|
| (Czech Republic) Josef Gulas | 20,200,000 (29.4%) | 0 | 2 | $6,842 |
| (Germany) Alexander Tkatschew | 17,375,000 (25.3%) | 0 | 10 | $57,494 |
| (France) Johan Guilbert | 13,025,000 (18.9%) | 0 | 22 | $431,567 |
| (Greece) Athanasios Kidas | 6,025,000 (8.8%) | 0 | 0 | 0 |
| (Netherlands) Thomas Denie | 5,500,000 (8.0%) | 0 | 0 | 0 |
| (Slovakia) Stanislav Koleno | 3,400,000 (4.9%) | 0 | 5 | $48,833 |
| (North Macedonia) Aleksandar Trajkovski | 3,250,000 (4.7%) | 0 | 4 | $8,600 |

*-Career statistics prior to the beginning of the 2021 WSOPE Main Event

=== Final Table results ===
| Place | Name | Prize |
|---|---|---|
| 1st | Josef Gulas (1/1) | €1,276,712 |
| 2nd | Johan Guilbert | €789,031 |
| 3rd | Alexander Tkatschew | €558,505 |
| 4th | Athanasios Kidas | €401,344 |
| 5th | Stanislav Koleno | €292,862 |
| 6th | Aleksandar Trajkovski | €217,854 |
| 7th | Thomas Denie | €163,434 |
| 8th | Ilija Savevski | €125,052 |
