= 2023 World Series of Poker Europe =

Series of poker tournaments

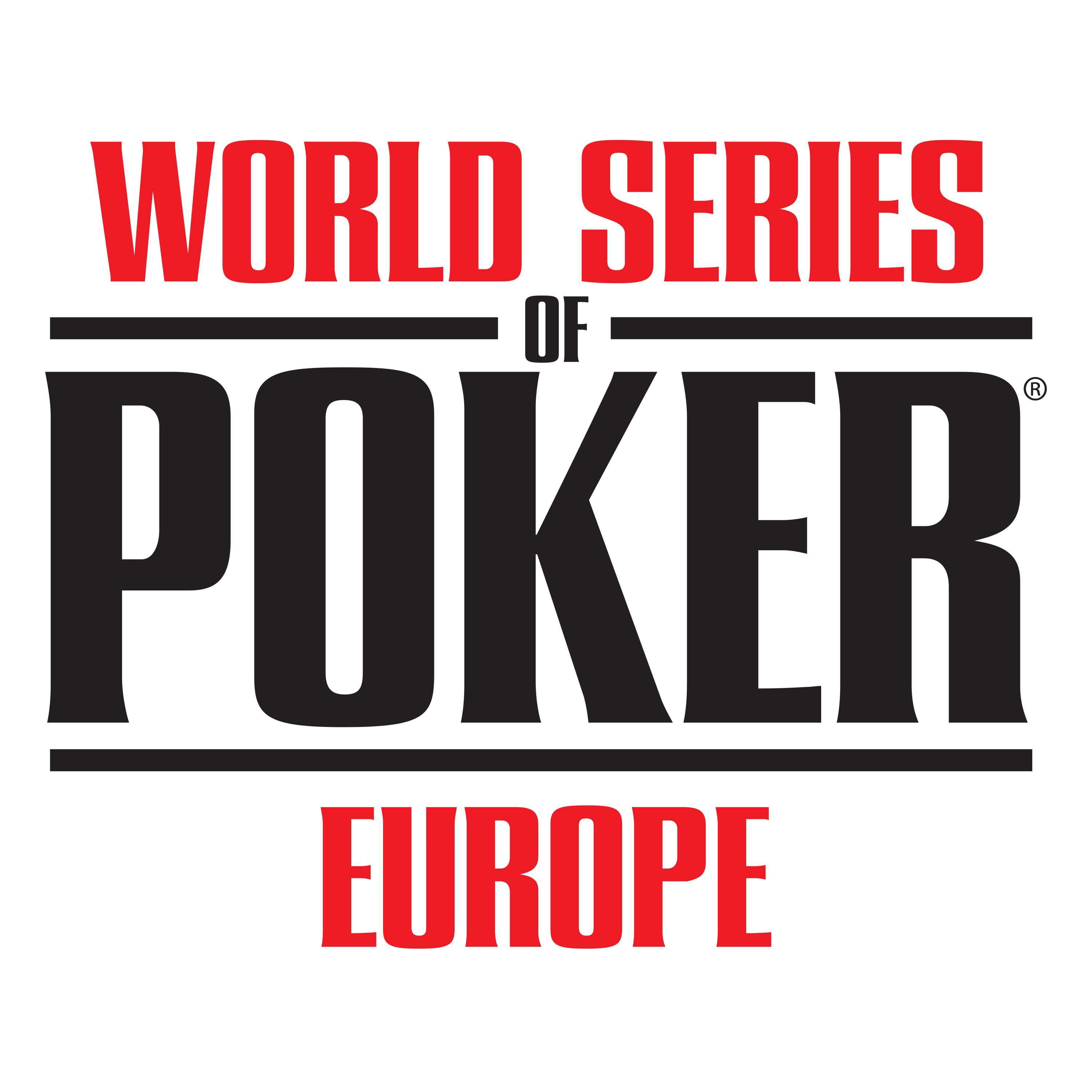
- Location: King's Casino, Rozvadov, Czech Republic
- Dates: 25 October – 15 November

Champion
- (Austria) Max Neugebauer

The 2023 World Series of Poker Europe was the 14th edition of the World Series of Poker Europe. It was held between 25 October – 15 November at King's Resort in Rozvadov, Czech Republic and featured 15 bracelet events.

Omar Eljach, the reigning WSOP Europe champion, won his second bracelet in Event #2: €550 Pot-Limit Omaha and had another second-place finish.

The Main Event attracted a record field of 817 entries and was won by Max Neugebauer of Austria.

== Event schedule ==
#	Event	Entrants	Winner	Prize	Runner-up	Results
1	€350 No-Limit Hold'em Opener	3,503	(Slovakia) Lukas Pazma (1/1)	€110,000	(Hungary) Andras Balogh	Results
2	€550 Pot-Limit Omaha	719	(Sweden) Omar Eljach (1/2)	€65,900	(Portugal) Diana Volcovschi	Results
3	€1,350 Mini Main Event	1,729	(Greece) Sokratis Linaras (1/1)	€310,350	(Norway) Daniel Lehmann	Results
4	€2,000 Pot-Limit Omaha	206	(Hong Kong) Hokyiu Lee (1/1)	€91,183	(Italy) Dario Alioto (0/1)	Results
5	€550 No-Limit Hold'em Colossus	3,436	(Italy) Ermanno Di Nicola (1/1)	€210,350	(Poland) Alain Saka	Results
6	€5,000 Pot-Limit Omaha	202	(Hong Kong) Wing Po Liu (1/1)	€230,000	(Sweden) Omar Eljach (1/2)	Results
7	€1,650 No-Limit Hold'em 6-Max	495	(Netherlands) Tobias Peters (1/1)	€143,100	(United Kingdom) Barny Boatman (0/2)	Results
8	€25,000 No-Limit Hold'em GGMillion€	89	(Canada) Daniel Dvoress (1/2)	€600,000	(United States) Michael Rocco	Results
9	€1,100 No-Limit Hold'em Mystery Bounty	803	(Sweden) Tobias Garp (1/1)	€92,300	(Austria) Adi Rajkovic	Results
10	€2,000 8-Game Mix	97	(Lithuania) Dainius Antanaitis (1/1)	€47,770	(United Kingdom) Ian Bradley	Results
11	€1,100 No-Limit Hold'em Turbo Bounty Hunter	570	(Sweden) Joakim Andersson (1/1)	€70,000	(Italy) Samantha Algeri	Results
12	€50,000 No-Limit Hold'em Diamond High Roller	34	(India) Santhosh Suvarna (1/1)	€650,000	(China) Ren Lin	Results
13	€10,350 No-Limit Hold'em Main Event	817	(Austria) Max Neugebauer (1/1)	€1,500,000	(Taiwan) Eric Tsai	Results
14	€1,000 No-Limit Hold'em Turbo Freezeout	182	(Germany) Bernd Gleissner (1/1)	€46,700	(Italy) Candido Cappiello	Results
15	€550 No-Limit Hold'em Closer	628	(Germany) Maurice Nass (1/1)	€60,000	(Romania) Traian Stanciu	Results

== Main Event ==
The €10,350 No-Limit Hold'em Main Event began on 10 November with the first of two starting flights. The event attracted 817 total entries, the most in WSOP Europe history, generating a prize pool of €7,761,500. The champion was crowned on 15 November and earned €1,500,000.

Max Neugebauer, a former professional basketball player from Austria, defeated Taiwan's Eric Tsai heads-up to win the title and his first WSOP bracelet.

=== Final Table ===
Name	Number of chips (percentage of total)	WSOP Bracelets	WSOP Cashes*	WSOP Earnings*
(Taiwan) Eric Tsai	23,650,000 (29.0%)	0	24	$327,247
(Lithuania) Kasparas Klezys	13,950,000 (17.1%)	0	50	$349,406
(Austria) Max Neugebauer	10,325,000 (12.7%)	0	3	$10,049
(Germany) Nils Pudel	9,875,000 (12.1%)	0	26	$100,867
(United States) Michael Rocco	8,000,000 (9.8%)	0	36	$1,376,692
(Italy) Michele Tocci	6,525,000 (8.0%)	0	3	$19,160
(Ukraine) Ruslan Volkov	6,000,000 (7.4%)	0	8	$23,274
(Sweden) Alf Martinsson	3,150,000 (3.9%)	0	1	$3,037

*Career statistics prior to the Main Event

=== Final Table results ===
Place	Name	Prize
1st	(Austria) Max Neugebauer (1/1)	€1,500,000
2nd	(Taiwan) Eric Tsai	€891,000
3rd	(Italy) Michele Tocci	€639,000
4th	(Lithuania) Kasparas Klezys	€464,000
5th	(United States) Michael Rocco	€341,000
6th	(Germany) Nils Pudel	€255,000
7th	(Ukraine) Ruslan Volkov	€193,000
8th	(Sweden) Alf Martinsson	€148,000
