= 2017 World Series of Poker Europe =

Series of poker tournaments

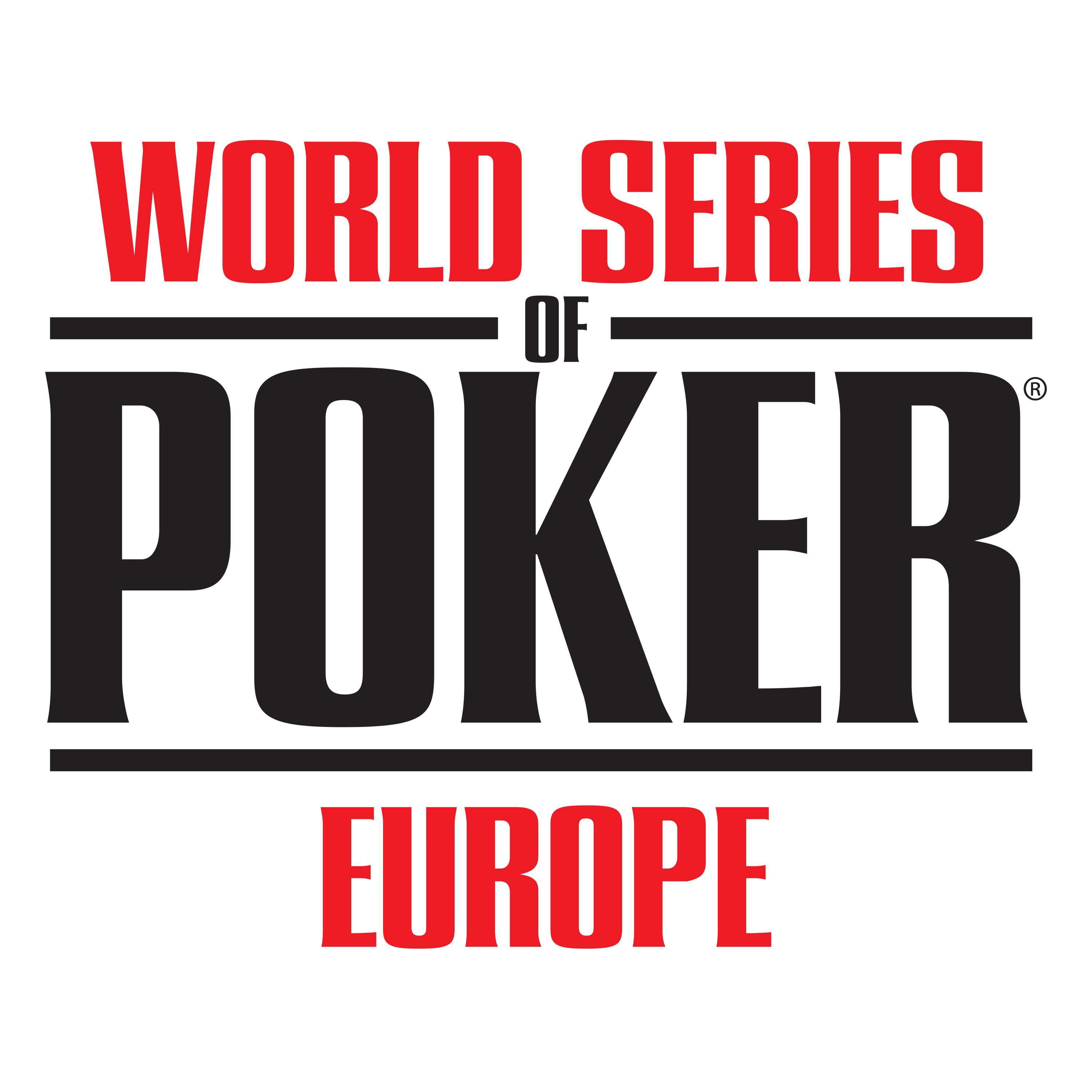
- Location: King's Casino, Rozvadov, Czech Republic
- Dates: 19 October – 10 November 2017

Champion
- (Spain) Marti Roca de Torres

The 2017 World Series of Poker Europe (WSOPE) took place from 19 October to 10 November at King's Casino in Rozvadov, Czech Republic. It featured 11 bracelet events with buy-ins ranging from €550 to €111,111, culminating in the €10,350 No Limit Hold'em Main Event. The series was the first WSOP Europe since 2015, and the first to take place in the Czech Republic.

== Event schedule ==
#	Event	Entrants	Winner	Prize	Runner-up	Results
1	€1,100 No Limit Hold'em Monster Stack	561	Oleksandr Shcherbak (1/1)	€117,707	Viliyan Petleshkov	Results
2	€550 Pot Limit Omaha	523	Andreas Klatt (1/1)	€56,400	Nico Ehlers	Results
3	€1,100 No Limit Hold'em Super Turbo Bounty	325	Martin Kabrhel (1/1)	€53,557	Philipp Caranica	Results
4	€1,650 No Limit Hold'em Six-Handed	240	Theodore McQuilkin (1/1)	€88,043	Jan Bednar	Results
5	€550 The Colossus No Limit Hold'em	4,115	Matous Skorepa (1/1)	€270,015	Florian Fuchs	Results
6	€2,200 Pot Limit Omaha	191	Lukas Zaskodny (1/1)	€93,677	Allen Kessler	Results
7	€1,650 Pot Limit Omaha Hi-Lo 8 or Better	92	Chris Ferguson (1/6)	€39,289	Stanislav Wright	Results
8	€1,100 Little One for One Drop No Limit Hold'em	868	Albert Hoekendijk (1/1)	€170,764	Thomas Hofmann	Results
9	€25,000 No Limit Hold'em High Roller	113	Niall Farrell (1/1)	€745,287	Benjamin Pollak	Results
10	€111,111 High Roller for One Drop No Limit Hold'em	132	Dominik Nitsche (1/4)	€3,487,463	Andreas Eiler	Results
11	€10,350 No Limit Hold'em Main Event	529	Marti Roca de Torres (1/1)	€1,115,207	Gianluca Speranza	Results

== Player of the Year ==
Final standings as of 10 November (end of WSOPE):

Standings
Rank	Name	Points	Bracelets
1	(United States) Chris Ferguson	1,178.53	1
2	(United States) John Racener	1,042.04	1
3	(United States) Ryan Hughes	994.35	0
4	(Canada) Mike Leah	910.01	0
5	(United States) John Monnette	865.2	1
6	(Belgium) Kenny Hallaert	838.35	0
7	(United States) Alex Foxen	833.45	0
8	(Italy) Dario Sammartino	775.89	0
9	(United States) Ray Henson	768.49	0
10	(United States) Ben Yu	766.49	1

== Main Event ==
The 2017 World Series of Poker Europe Main Event began on 4 November and finished 10 November. The event drew 529 entrants, generating a prize pool of €5,025,500. The top 80 players made the money, with the winner earning €1,115,207.

=== Final Table ===
Name	Number of chips (percentage of total)	WSOP Bracelets	WSOP Cashes*	WSOP Earnings*
(United States) Maria Ho	7,830,000 (29.7%)	0	44	$1,311,124
(Spain) Marti Roca de Torres	7,260,000 (27.5%)	0	1	$1,932
(Italy) Gianluca Speranza	4,400,000 (16.7%)	0	11	$215,441
(United Kingdom) Niall Farrell	3,025,000 (11.5%)	1	36	$2,286,524
(Netherlands) Mathijs Jonkers	2,785,000 (10.6%)	0	0	0
(United Kingdom) Robert Bickley	1,085,000 (4.1%)	0	3	$9,654

*-Career statistics prior to beginning of 2017 WSOPE Main Event

=== Final Table results ===
Place	Name	Prize
1st	Marti Roca de Torres (1/1)	€1,115,207
2nd	Gianluca Speranza	€689,246
3rd	Mathijs Jonkers	€476,585
4th	Robert Bickley	€335,089
5th	Niall Farrell (1/1)	€239,639
6th	Maria Ho	€174,365
7th	Jack Salter	€129,121
8th	Luis Rodriguez	€97,344
