= 2022 World Series of Poker Europe =

Series of poker tournaments

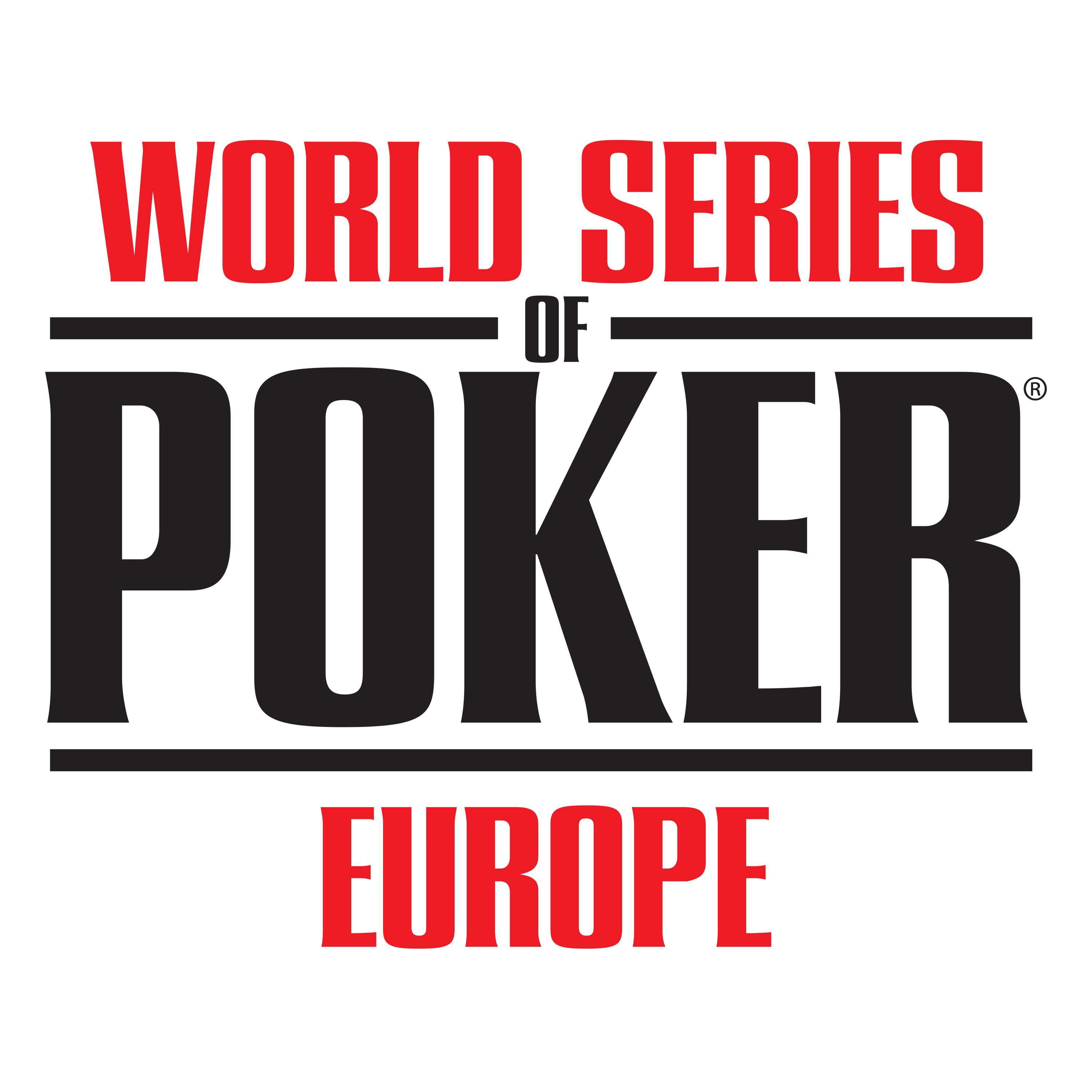
- Location: King's Casino, Rozvadov, Czech Republic
- Dates: 26 October – 16 November

Champion
- (Sweden) Omar Eljach

The 2022 World Series of Poker Europe (WSOPE) was the 13th edition of the World Series of Poker Europe, a series of poker tournaments organized by the WSOP. It was between 26 October – 16 November at King's Casino in Rozvadov, Czech Republic and consisted of 15 WSOP bracelet events.

== Event schedule ==
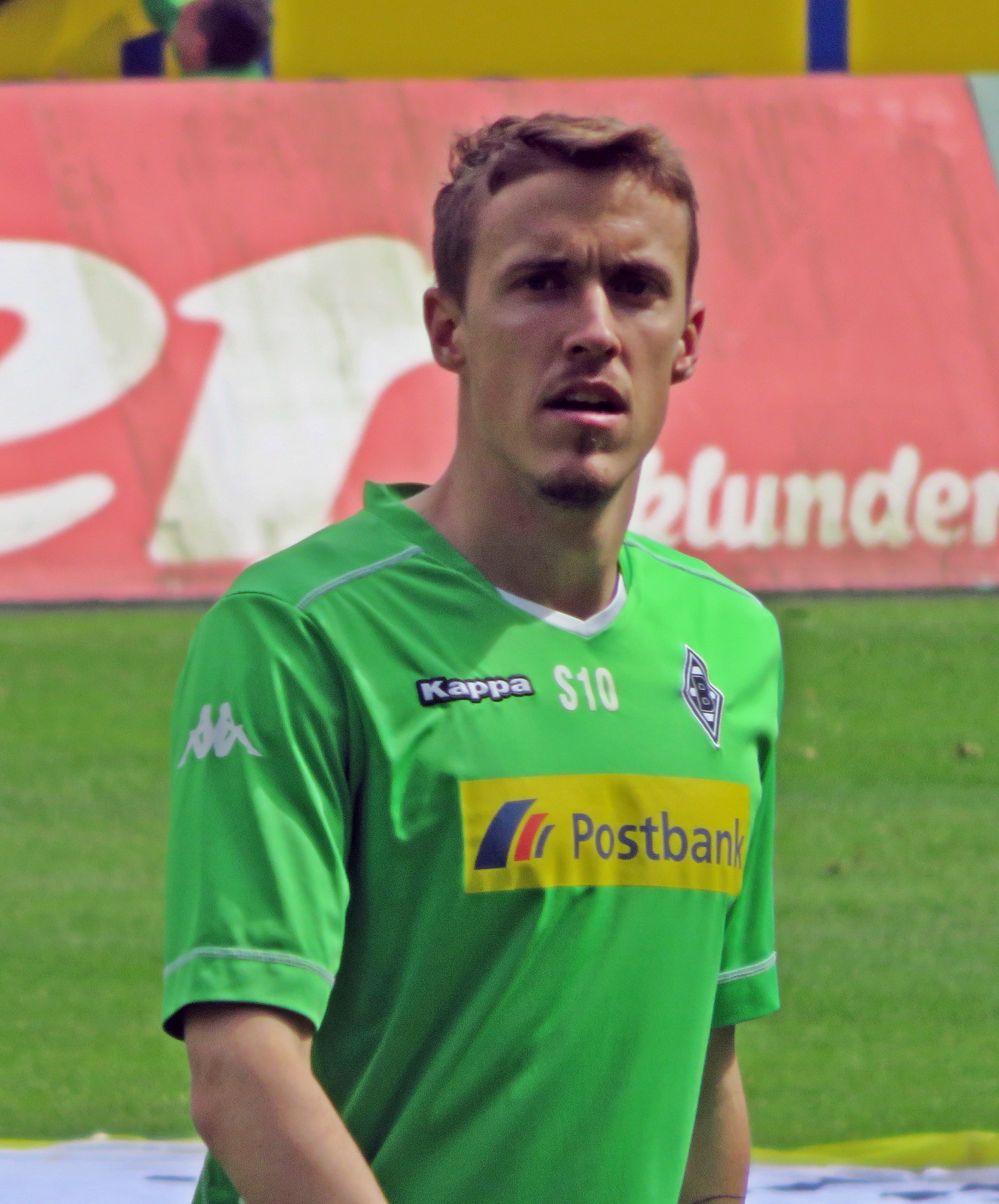
German professional football player Max Kruse earned his first WSOP bracelet in Event #7

#	Event	Entrants	Winner	Prize	Runner-up	Results
1	€350 No-Limit Hold'em Opener	2,454	(Italy) Fabio Peluso (1/1)	€95,670	(Italy) Carlo Savinelli	Results
2	€550 Pot-Limit Omaha 8-Max	566	(Germany) Helmut Phung (1/1)	€55,132	(Norway) Martin Almaas	Results
3	€1,350 Mini Main Event	1,431	(North Macedonia) Ilija Savevski (1/1)	€245,319	(Germany) Stefan Schoss	Results
4	€2,000 Pot-Limit Omaha	221	(Hong Kong) Anson Tsang (1/3)	€95,461	(Poland) Tomasz Gluszko	Results
5	€550 No-Limit Hold'em Colossus	2,982	(Slovakia) Lubos Laska (1/1)	€170,568	(Netherlands) Nino Pansier	Results
6	€5,000 Pot-Limit Omaha	223	(Ukraine) Roman Verenko (1/1)	€247,288	(Sweden) Omar Eljach	Results
7	€1,650 No-Limit Hold'em 6-Handed	413	(Germany) Max Kruse (1/1)	€134,152	(France) Dorian Melchers	Results
8	€25,000 No-Limit Hold'em Platinum High Roller	67	(Malaysia) Paul Phua (1/1)	€482,433	(South Korea) Gab Yong Kim	Results
9	€2,200 Short Deck	91	(Switzerland) Emil Bise (1/2)	€49,521	(Czech Republic) Jakub Koleckar	Results
10	€2,000 8-Game Mix	102	(Germany) Thomer Pidun (1/1)	€49,245	(Ukraine) Oleksii Kovalchuk (0/2)	Results
11	€50,000 No-Limit Hold'em Diamond High Roller	45	(Turkey) Orpen Kisacikoglu (1/1)	€748,106	(United Kingdom) Sam Grafton	Results
12	€10,350 No-Limit Hold'em Main Event	763	(Sweden) Omar Eljach (1/1)	€1,380,128	(France) Jonathan Pastore (1/1)	Results
13	€1,650 PLO/NLH Mixed	251	(Netherlands) Yair van Ruiten (1/1)	€85,405	(Greece) Ioannis Angelou Konstas	Results
14	€1,100 No-Limit Hold'em Bounty Hunter	436	(Belgium) Karim Maekelberg (1/1)	€62,111	(Germany) Theo Schmitt	Results
15	€1,000 No-Limit Hold'em Turbo Freezeout	211	(Ukraine) Andriy Lyubovetskiy (1/2)	€45,606	(Ukraine) Oleksii Kovalchuk (0/2)	Results

== Main Event ==
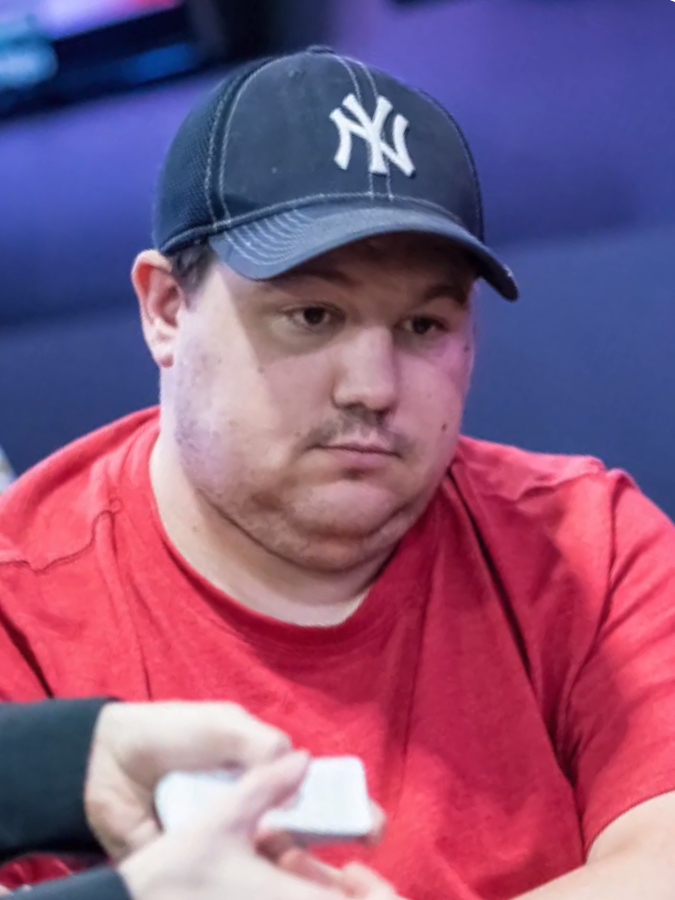
Five-time WSOP bracelet winner Shaun Deeb finished in third place in the Main Event

The €10,350 No-Limit Hold'em Main Event began on 11 November with the first of two starting flights. The event attracted 763 total entrants, making it the largest Main Event in WSOPE history.

The top 115 players finished in the money and earned a share of the €7,248,500 prizepool, with the champion earning €1,380,129. Sweden's Omar Eljach, who finished second in Event #6 earlier in the 2022 WSOPE, beat another 2022 bracelet winner, Jonathan Pastore of France, to win the title and his first WSOP bracelet.

=== Final Table ===
Name	Number of chips (percentage of total)	WSOP Bracelets	WSOP Cashes*	WSOP Earnings*
(Sweden) Omar Eljach	19,480,000 (25.5%)	0	8	$377,217
(United States) Shaun Deeb	16,580,000 (21.7%)	5	136	$7,668,881
(France) Jonathan Pastore	9,925,000 (13.0%)	1	7	$789,770
(Romania) Paul Covaciu	9,125,000 (12.0%)	0	1	$3,322
(United Kingdom) Barny Boatman	7,730,000 (10.1%)	2	67	$1,702,678
(Lithuania) Vladas Tamasauskas	5,950,000 (7.8%)	0	26	$280,645
(France) Alexandre Reard	5,300,000 (6.9%)	1	35	$1,117,834
(Austria) Armin Rezaei	2,205,000 (2.9%)	0	11	$71,376

*Career statistics prior to the 2022 WSOPE Main Event

=== Final Table results ===
Place	Name	Prize
1st	(Sweden) Omar Eljach (1/1)	€1,380,128
2nd	(France) Jonathan Pastore	€852,949
3rd	(United States) Shaun Deeb (0/5)	€607,531
4th	(Lithuania) Vladas Tamasauskas	€438,978
5th	(Romania) Paul Covaciu	€321,838
6th	(Austria) Armin Rezaei	€239,466
7th	(United Kingdom) Barny Boatman (0/2)	€180,867
8th	(France) Alexandre Reard (0/1)	€138,702
