= 2023 World Series of Poker Europe results =

Below are the results of the 2023 World Series of Poker Europe, held from October 25-November 14 at King's Casino in Rozvadov, Czech Republic. There were 15 scheduled bracelet events.

== Key ==
*	Elected to the Poker Hall of Fame
(#/#)	This denotes a bracelet winner. The first number is the number of bracelets won in the 2023 WSOP. The second number is the total number of bracelets won. Both numbers represent totals as of that point during the tournament.
Place	What place each player at the final table finished
Name	The player who made it to the final table
Prize (€)	The amount of money awarded for each finish at the event's final table

== Results ==
=== Event #1: €350 No-Limit Hold'em Opener ===
- 6-Day Event: October 25-30
- Number of Entries: 3,503 (2,359 entries + 1,144 re-entries)
- Total Prize Pool: €1,048,272
- Number of Payouts: 499
- Winning Hand: A♠ Q♦

Final Table
Place	Name	Prize
1st	(Slovakia) Lukas Pazma (1/1)	€120,350
2nd	(Hungary) Andras Balogh	€76,350
3rd	(Slovakia) Stanislav Koleno	€58,350
4th	(Romania) Florin Bilan	€45,350
5th	(Austria) Stephan Glausch	€36,850
6th	(Netherlands) Iman Ghashayar	€30,350
7th	(Italy) Alessandro De Michele	€25,850
8th	(Romania) Stefan Drusca	€22,350
9th	(Switzerland) Emil Bise (0/2)	€20,350

=== Event #2: €550 Pot-Limit Omaha 8-Max ===
- 5-Day Event: October 27-31
- Number of Entries: 719 (414 entries + 305 re-entries)
- Total Prize Pool: €341,525
- Number of Payouts: 1-9
- Winning Hand: Q♣ 8♣ 3♦ 2♥

Final Table
Place	Name	Prize
1st	(Sweden) Omar Eljach (1/1)	€65,900
2nd	(Portugal) Diana Volcovschi	€40,700
3rd	(United States) Roland Israelashvili	€29,100
4th	(Portugal) Michael Rodrigues	€21,000
5th	(Belarus) Ihar Pliashko	€15,500
6th	(Italy) Martino Cito	€11,500
7th	(Czech Republic) Patrik Jaros	€8,700
8th	(Hong Kong) Yan Tsang	€6,700

=== Event #3: €1,350 Mini Main Event No Limit Hold'em ===
- 7-Day Event: October 29-November 4
- Number of Entries: 1,729 (1,304 entries + 425 re-entries)
- Total Prize Pool: €1,971,060
- Number of Payouts: 260
- Winning Hand: A♦ Q♦

Final Table
Place	Name	Prize
1st	(Greece) Sokratis Linaras (1/1)	€310,350
2nd	(Norway) Daniel Lehmann	€183,850
3rd	(France) Jamel Ghizaoui	€136,750
4th	(Sweden) Omar Eljach (1/2)	€103,350
5th	(Mongolia) Bayar Saran	€79,650
6th	(Lebanon) Georges Chehade	€62,550
7th	(Germany) Aleksej Grenz	€50,050
8th	(Germany) Francis Klar	€40,950
9th	(England) Matthew Davenport	€34,150

=== Event #4: €2,000 Pot-Limit Omaha ===
- 2-Day Event: October 31-November 1
- Number of Entries: 206 (113 entries + 93 re-entries)
- Total Prize Pool: €362,045
- Number of Payouts: 31
- Winning Hand: A♣ 6♣ 5♦ 4♠

Final Table
Place	Name	Prize
1st	(Hong Kong) Hokyiu Lee (1/1)	€91,183
2nd	(Italy) Dario Alioto (0/1)	€56,358
3rd	(South Korea) Gab Yong Kim	€38,800
4th	(Germany) Daniel Smuskovics	€27,366
5th	(England) Barny Boatman (0/2)	€19,785
6th	(Italy) Bruno Stefanelli	€14,673
7th	(China) Zhengfan Ye	€11,168
8th	(South Korea) Kim Namhyung	€8,732
9th	(Germany) Guy Goossens	€7,017

=== Event #5: €550 No-Limit Hold'em Colossus ===
- 6-Day Event: November 1-6
- Number of Entries: 3,436 (2,453 entries + 983 re-entries)
- Total Prize Pool: €1,632,100
- Number of Payouts: 495
- Winning Hand: K♦ 5♠

Final Table
Place	Name	Prize
1st	(Italy) Ermanno Di Nicola (1/1)	€210,350
2nd	(Poland) Alain Deniz Saka	€125,350
3rd	(Italy) Angelo Marrone	€97,350
4th	(Italy) Alessandro Predaroli	€76,350
5th	(Netherlands) Tobias Peters	€61,630
6th	(France) Julien Loire	€49,150
7th	(Switzerland) Xhavid Berisha	€40,350
8th	(Finland) Juuso Luokkanen	€33,700
9th	(Germany) Dennis Magro	€28,625

=== Event #6: €5,000 Pot-Limit Omaha ===
- 2-Day Event: November 5-6
- Number of Entries: 202 (119 entries + 83 re-entries)
- Total Prize Pool: €911,525
- Number of Payouts: 34
- Winning Hand: Q♥ Q♦ 10♣ 3♥

Final Table
Place	Name	Prize
1st	(Hong Kong) Wing Po Liu (1/1)	€230,000
2nd	(Sweden) Omar Eljach (1/2)	€141,800
3rd	(Lithuania) Kasparas Klezys	€97,600
4th	(Hong Kong) Yan Shing Tsang (0/2)	€68,850
5th	(Italy) Marco Di Persio	€49,800
6th	(Hungary) Gergo Nagy	€36,900
7th	(South Korea) Wooram Cho	€28,100
8th	(China) Tong Li (0/1)	€22,000
9th	(Ukraine) Oleksii Kovalchuk (0/2)	€17,625

=== Event #7: €1,650 No-Limit Hold'em 6-Handed ===
- 2-Day Event: November 6-7
- Number of Entries: 495 (315 entries + 180 re-entries)
- Total Prize Pool: €705,375
- Number of Payouts: 75
- Winning Hand: A♣ 9♦

Final Table
Place	Name	Prize
1st	(Netherlands) Tobias Peters (1/1)	€153,450
2nd	(England) Barny Boatman (0/2)	€98,850
3rd	(Israel) Rafi Elharar	€70,450
4th	(Spain) Jorge Ufano Pardo	€41,600
5th	(Hungary) Daniel Koloszar	€29,400
6th	(Austria) Adem Marjanovic	€21,200
7th	(Belarus) Artsiom Panasiuk	€15,575

=== Event #8: €25,000 No-Limit Hold'em GGMillion$ ===
- 2-Day Event: November 6-7
- Number of Entries: 99 (72 entries + 17 re-entries)
- Total Prize Pool: €2,079,930
- Number of Payouts: 14
- Winning Hand: A♠ 8♥

Final Table
Place	Name	Prize
1st	(Canada) Daniel Dvoress (1/2)	€600,000
2nd	(United States) Michael Rocco	€365,000
3rd	(Czech Republic) Martin Kabrhel (0/2)	€260,000
4th	(South Korea) Gab Yong Kim	€189,000
5th	(Germany) Leonard Maue	€140,300
6th	(Sweden) Niklas Astedt	€106,600
7th	(France) Cedric Schwaederle	€82,900
8th	(Hungary) Tamas Adamszky	€66,200
9th	(Sweden) Jerry Ödeen (0/1)	€54,100

=== Event #9: €1,100 WSOPE Mystery Bounty ===
- 2-Day Event: November 7-8
- Number of Entries: 803 (431 entries + 372 re-entries)
- Total Prize Pool: €521,950
- Number of Payouts: 121
- Winning Hand: 8♣ 8♠

Final Table
Place	Name	Prize
1st	(Sweden) Tobias Garp (1/1)	€92,300
2nd	(Austria) Adi Rajkovic	€67,350
3rd	(Turkey) Koray Korkmaz	€50,750
4th	(France) Benjamin Pitoun	€29,050
5th	(Germany) Otto Lemke	€21,200
6th	(Poland) Stanislaw Miadzel	€15,700
7th	(Germany) Alexander Romme	€11,800
8th	(Switzerland) Martin Schamaun	€9,000
9th	(Ukraine) Yehor Shumeiko	€6,990

=== Event #10: €2,000 8-Game Mix ===
- 2-Day Event: November 8-9
- Number of Entries: 97 (63 entries + 34 re-entries)
- Total Prize Pool: €170,477
- Number of Payouts: 15
- Winning Hand: Kg 4♣ 3♦ 2♥ (Omaha Hi-Lo)

Final Table
Place	Name	Prize
1st	(Lithuania) Dainius Antanaitis (1/1)	€47,770
2nd	(England) Ian Bradley	€29,525
3rd	(South Korea) Wooram Cho	€20,640
4th	(Greece) Ioannis Angelou-Konstas	€14,795
5th	(Sweden) Viktor Blom	€10,885
6th	(Ukraine) Oleksii Kovalchuk (0/2)	€8,220
7th	(United States) Roland Israelashvili	€6,380

=== Event #11: €1,100 No-Limit Hold'em Bounty Hunter ===
- 1-Day Event: November 9
- Number of Entries: 570 (354 entries + 216 re-entries)
- Total Prize Pool: €370,500
- Number of Payouts: 86
- Winning Hand: 7♥ 6♣

Final Table
Place	Name	Prize
1st	(Sweden) Joakim Andersson (1/1)	€80,350
2nd	(Italy) Samantha Algeri	€53,150
3rd	(Brazil) Bruno Mota	€40,250
4th	(France) Jonathan Pastore (0/1)	€21,275
5th	(Italy) Agostino Scozzari	€15,400
6th	(England) Robert Bickley	€11,300
7th	(Italy) Jacopo Achille	€8,450
8th	(Spain) Miguel Abad	€6,450
9th	(Moldova) Stepan Budac	€5,000

=== Event #12: €50,000 No-Limit Hold'em Diamond High Roller ===
- 2-Day Event: November 9-10
- Number of Entries: 37 (29 entries + 8 re-entries)
- Total Prize Pool: €1,739,925
- Number of Payouts: 6
- Winning Hand: K♠ 6♥

Final Table
Place	Name	Prize
1st	(India) Santhosh Suvarna (1/1)	€650,000
2nd	(China) Tony Lin 'Ren'	€400,000
3rd	(Canada) Daniel Dvoress (1/1)	€266,000
4th	(United States) Christopher Brewer (0/2)	€185,000
5th	(Greece) Ioannis Angelou-Konstas	€135,000
6th	(Czech Republic) Martin Kabrhel (0/2)	€103,925

=== Event #13: €10,350 No-Limit Hold'em Main Event ===
- 6-Day Event: November 10-15
- Number of Entries: 817 (712 entries + 105 re-entries)
- Total Prize Pool: €7,761,500
- Number of Payouts: 123
- Winning Hand: J♠ 8♣

Final Table
Place	Name	Prize
1st	(Austria) Max Neugebauer (1/1)	€1,500,000
2nd	(Taiwan) Eric Tsai	€891,000
3rd	(Italy) Michele Tocci	€639,000
4th	(Lithuania) Kasparas Klezys	€464,000
5th	(United States) Michael Rocco (0/1)	€341,000
6th	(Germany) Nils Pudel	€255,000
7th	(Ukraine) Ruslan Volkov	€193,000
8th	(Sweden) Adam Martinsson	€148,000
9th	(Bulgaria) Yulian Bogdanov	€115,300

=== Event #14: €1,000 Turbo Freezeout ===
- 2-Day Event: November 12
- Number of Entries: 182
- Total Prize Pool: €203,026
- Number of Payouts: 28
- Winning Hand: Q♦ 9♦

Final Table
Place	Name	Prize
1st	(Germany) Bernd Gleissner (1/1)	€46,700
2nd	(Italy) Candido Cappiello	€28,800
3rd	(Austria) Moritz Dietrich	€20,650
4th	(Italy) Simone Piazzini	€15,050
5th	(Italy) Alessandro Predaroli	€11,200
6th	(Italy) Veronica Tuscano	€8,460
7th	(Cyprus) Angelos Michael	€6,500
8th	(Taiwan) James Cowen (0/3)	€5,100
9th	(Czech Republic) Jan Bogas	€4,075

=== Event #15: €550 No-Limit Hold'em Closer ===
- 3-Day Event: November 12-14
- Number of Entries: 628
- Total Prize Pool: €298,300
- Number of Payouts: 84
- Winning Hand: J♠ 6♠

Final Table
Place	Name	Prize
1st	(Germany) Maurice Nass (1/1)	€60,000
2nd	(Romania) Traian Stanciu	€37,667
3rd	(Germany) Duc Tuan Tran	€25,900
4th	(Romania) Sefora-Emanuela Pop	€18,600
5th	(France) Anthony Mahaut	€13,600
6th	(Romania) Bogdan-Alexandru Tilica	€10,050
7th	(Netherlands) Theodoor Woolschot	€7,550
8th	(United States) Roland Israelashvili	€6,604
9th	(Poland) Andrzej Jedryczka	€4,474
