= Seth Davies =

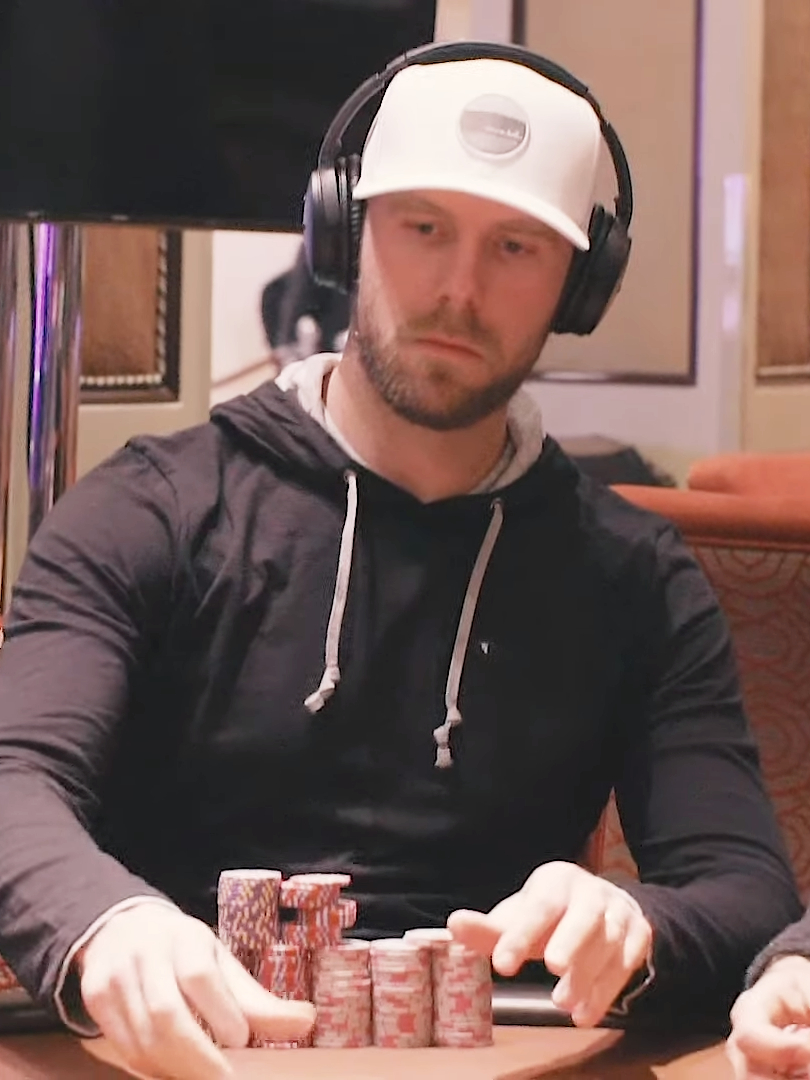
- Seth Davies (2019)
- Born: 1988/1989; Bend, Oregon

World Series of Poker
- Bracelet: None
- Final table: 1
- Money finishes: 39
- Highest WSOP Main Event finish: 123rd, 2011

World Poker Tour
- Title: 1
- Money finishes: 9

European Poker Tour
- Title: None
- Money finishes: 3

Seth Davies (* 1988 or 1989) is a professional American poker player.

Davies, through poker, has made over $22.5 million. In 2016, he won the Main Event of the World Poker Tour.

== Personal life ==
Davies went to the University of Oregon in Eugene. He lives in Bend, Oregon.

== Poker career ==
In June 2010 Davies reached his first prize finish at a live tournament in the Venetian Resort Hotel located on the Las Vegas Strip. In June 2011, the US citizen succeeded for the first time at the World Series of Poker (WSOP) in the Rio All-Suite Hotel and Casino, also on the Las Vegas Strip, and reached the money ranks at two tournaments with the Variant No Limit Hold’em, where he, among other placements, made the 123rd rank in the Main Event. In late June 2012, he reached his first WSOP final table and came 7th place in an Ante Only event, winning US$30,000.

In early May 2016 Davies won the Main Event of the World Poker Tour (WPT) in Kahnawake and secured prize money of more than CA$ 250,000. In mid August 2016, he was able to reach second place at the Seminole Hard Rock Poker Open Championship in Hollywood, Florida, after losing the Heads-Up against Jason Koon and received US$575,000. In September 2017, the US citizen placed 4th at the fifth Event of the Poker Masters at the Aria Resort and Casino, located on the Las Vegas Strip for a payout of US$324,000.

In late August 2018 he played at an event of the European Poker Tour (ETP )in Barcelona with a buy-in of €50.000, and finished in 6th place, which was worth over €200,000. In mid-September 2018, placed 3rd at the sixth tournament of the Poker Masters,earning over $350.000. In December 2018, he came in 3rd again at the Bellagio 25k of the Five Diamond World Poker Classic, an event held at the Hotel Bellagio on the Las Vegas Strip, where he was able to make a Deal with Nick Petrangelo and Sergio Aido for more than $250.000. Four days later, he prevailed at the third Bellagio 25k and secured about $340.000 through a deal with Isaac Haxton.

In late August 2019 the US citizen came in 2nd at an event hosted by the ETP in Barcelona and was awarded prize money of about $720.000. In mid-November 2019, he reached the Final Table of the Super High Roller Bowl Bahamas as the chip leader and finished 5th overall for a prize of around a $1 million. In December 2019, Davies was part of the Final Table at the WPT-Main-Event at the Bellagio and was awarded about $830.000 for his 3rd place finish. At the 2021 Super High Roller Series Europe, a tournament held in Kyrenia, Northern Cyprus, he surpassed $10 million in career prize money with four prize finishes, including a win at the eighth event. At the 2021 WSOP, the US citizen placed 4th at the Super High Roller and secured around $1 million.

In early May 2022 he was able to finish 1st and 2nd at one-day High Roller Events by the EPT in Monte-Carlo, earning himself overall prizes of about €770,000. In the same month, Davies reached three prize finishes at the Triton Poker Series in Madrid and made roughly $1.5 million. He also succeeded at five events of the Triton Series in Kyrenia in September 2022, and received payouts of over $2.2 million. In late January 2023, the US citizen placed 2nd at the Super High Roller of the PokerStars Caribbean Adventures, which was played in the Bahamas, and made another $1 million through a Deal with Adrián Mateos and Isaac Haxton.

=== Poker prize money ===
Year	Tournament wins	Prize Money (US$)
2010	0	$1,874
2011	0	$57,706
2012	0	$59,243
2013	0	$1,797
2014	0	$3,881
2015	0	$70,824
2016	2	$973,247
2017	0	$572,287
2018	1	$1,683,944
2019	2	$4,175,684
2020	0	$1,028,572
2021	1	$3,585,391
2022	1	$5,422,080
2023	0	$4,971,396
in total	7	$22,607,926
