= Leon Tsoukernik =

Czech entrepreneur, philanthropist and art collector

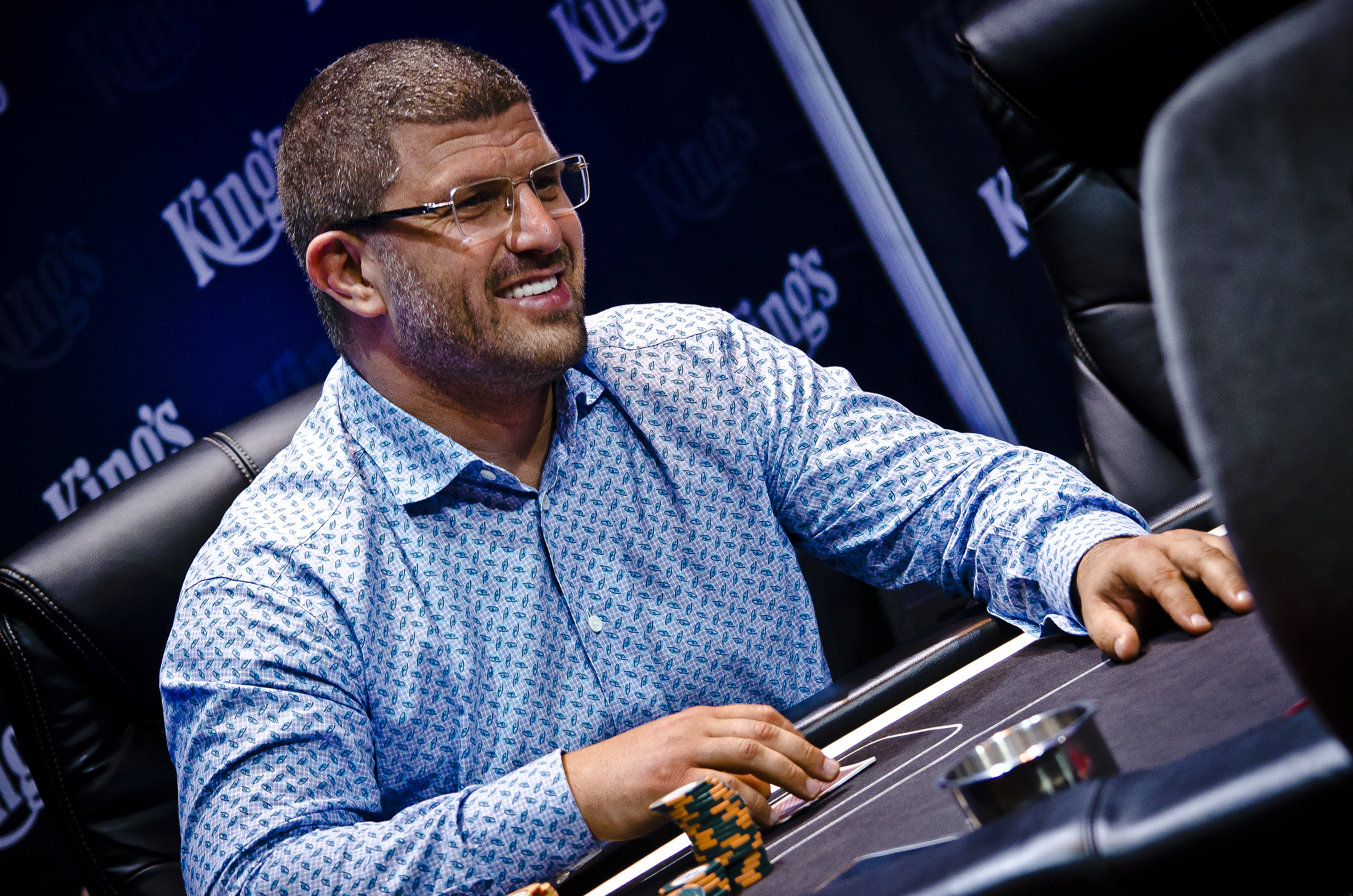
- Born: 7 November 1973 (age 52); Moscow, USSR
- Occupations: entrepreneur, art collector, poker player, former CEO of Vestar Group and King's Casino
- Known for: King's Casino Rozvadov
- Children: 2

Leon Tsoukernik (born 7 November 1973) is a Czech entrepreneur, philanthropist and art collector known for the establishment of King's Casino, the casino with the largest poker room in Europe where he held the position of CEO.

He has achieved success in poker, ranking among the most accomplished players in the Czech Republic.

Tsoukernik is the main sponsor of the hockey team HC Škoda Plzeň.

== Career ==
=== Antiquities ===
Tsoukernik's career began in 1991 in Toronto, Canada, where he worked as an assistant for an antique business. In 1993 he left Canada as an independent antiquity businessman, and he relocated to Prague, Czech Republic. As a prominent salesman of Biedermeier furniture at the time, he met Adam Brown and Andrea Zemel. This meeting eventually led to the foundation of an international antiquity company, ILIAD Antik New York, in 1999.

By 1993, Tsoukernik opened two antique stores in Prague and another two stores in Washington D.C. and New York City. He has attended international exhibitions in Palm Beach, Dallas and New York City.

Celebrities have used his services as an antiquity salesman, they include, Václav Havel, Madeleine Albright, Jackie Chan, Tom Cruise, Ronald Lauder, Paloma Picasso and Augusto Pinochet.

=== Casino business ===
In 2002, as a well-known poker player, Tsoukernik decided to buy land in Rozvadov, a border crossing between Czech Republic and Germany, and build his own casino. On 26 June 2003, King's Casino Rozvadov was officially opened. In 2009 it was transformed into a poker-oriented casino.

Tsoukernik was presented with the Industry Person of the Year award by European Poker Awards in 2014.

Since 2002 Tsoukernik has further extended the King's brand by building several casinos – in 2010 the King's Admiral Rozvadov, in 2011 King's Casino Prague and in 2014 the Casino Bellevue Marienbad. 4-star hotels were also built for casino players. In 2016 construction on a new casino officially began, accompanied by a construction of a 5-star hotel for players. The new casino area and hotel construction was finished in 2017 and King's Casino was renamed into King's Resort.

The World Series of Poker Europe (WSOPE) is taking place at King's Resort annually since 2017.

In 2019, Leon Tsoukernik acquired the Atrium Casino at the Hilton Prague Hotel in the Czech Republic. It was renamed to King's Casino Prague and hosts the European Poker Tour Prague.

He won the slot jackpot of €1,372,500 (~$1,530,500) at the Casino Seefeld in January 2020.

In 2020, King's Resort announced a partnership with GGPoker.

In June 2024, after more than two decades, Tsoukernik sold King's Casino and exited the gambling industry.

=== Poker ===
Tsoukernik regularly participates in global high-roller tournaments and high stakes cash games. His results included a victory at the 2016 EPT Super High Roller tournament in Prague, winning €741,100 and a 4th-place finish in the 2017 Super High Roller Bowl tournament in Las Vegas, winning $1.8 million. Tsoukernik also won the European Masters Series of Pot Limit Omaha, Rozvadov in 2014, winning €27,442 and he came 3rd at the same series event in 2014 winning €13,340 and 2nd at the CAPT Innsbruck 2011, winning €33,020. He won the €100,000 Short Deck, winning €1,102,000 during the 2019 WSOP Europe, defeating Phil Ivey in Heads-up.

In 2016 and 2017, poker players Elton Tsang and Matt Kirk accused Tsoukernik of refusing to pay gambling debts. In the spring of 2018 Leon Tsoukernik participated in one of the biggest cash games in Montreal, Canada, winning a record pot against Matt Kirk. The two have not been on good terms recently, but apparently their differences have been settled, and Leon and Matt are friends again.

Tsoukernik played on partypoker LIVE’s streams multiple times, where he plays under the screen name “KingsOfLeon”.

As of November 2020, Tsoukernik has won $4.936 million in live tournament earnings, over the course of 8 years.

=== Personal life ===
He has two children, son Leonel and a daughter Isabelle. He loves art, poker, helicopters and classical music.

=== Religion and philanthropy ===
Leon Tsoukernik professes Judaism. In 2023, he bought a plot of land in Marienbad on which stood a synagogue from 1884 to 1938, which was set on fire and completely destroyed by the Nazis during Kristallnacht on 9–10 November 1938. Tsoukernik plans to build a new modern synagogue on the site, for which he has chosen the architect Moshe Safdie.
