= Marti Roca de Torres =

Spanish poker player

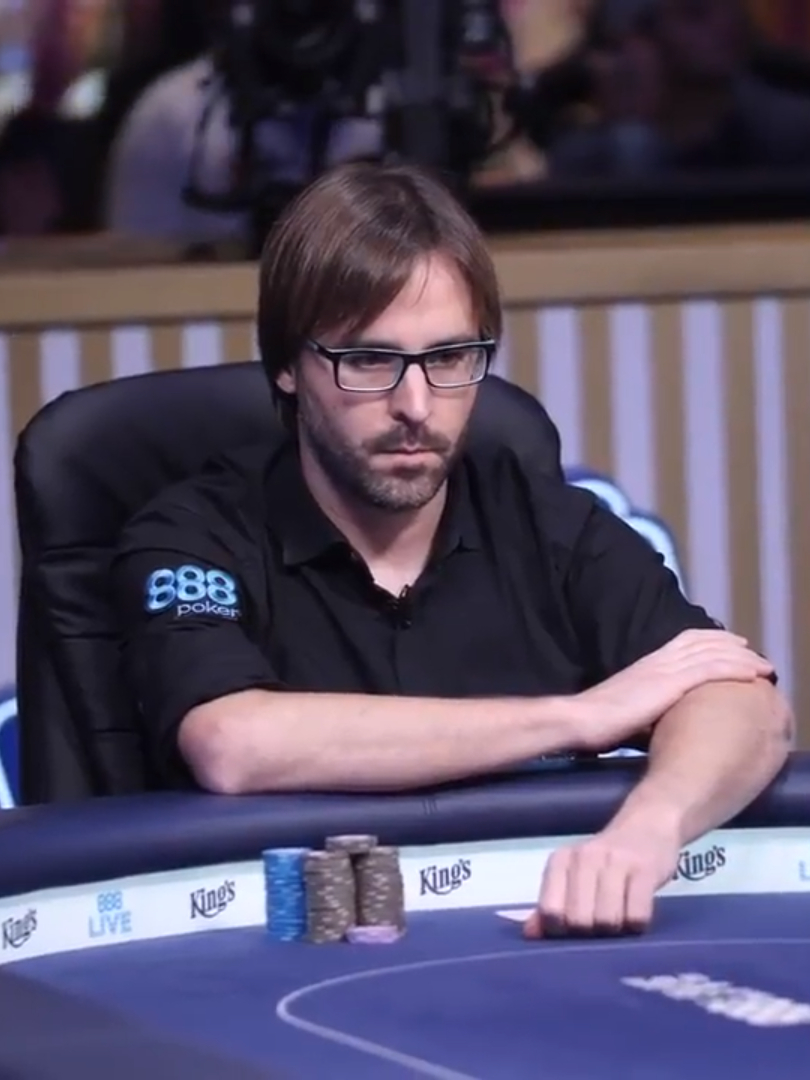
- Marti Roca de Torres in 2017

World Series of Poker
- Bracelet: 1
- Final table: 1
- Money finishes: 2

European Poker Tour
- Money finishes: 3

Marti Roca de Torres is a professional poker player who won a World Series of Poker bracelet in the 2017 World Series of Poker Europe main event for €1,115,207. He was born in Barcelona and lived in Mataró at the time of his first bracelet. He is a former economics teacher.

== World Series of Poker ==
World Series of Poker bracelets
Year	Tournament	Prize (US$)
2017E	€10,350 No Limit Hold'em Championship	€1,115,207

An "E" following a year denotes bracelet(s) won at the World Series of Poker Europe
