= Chris Ferguson =

American poker player (born 1963)

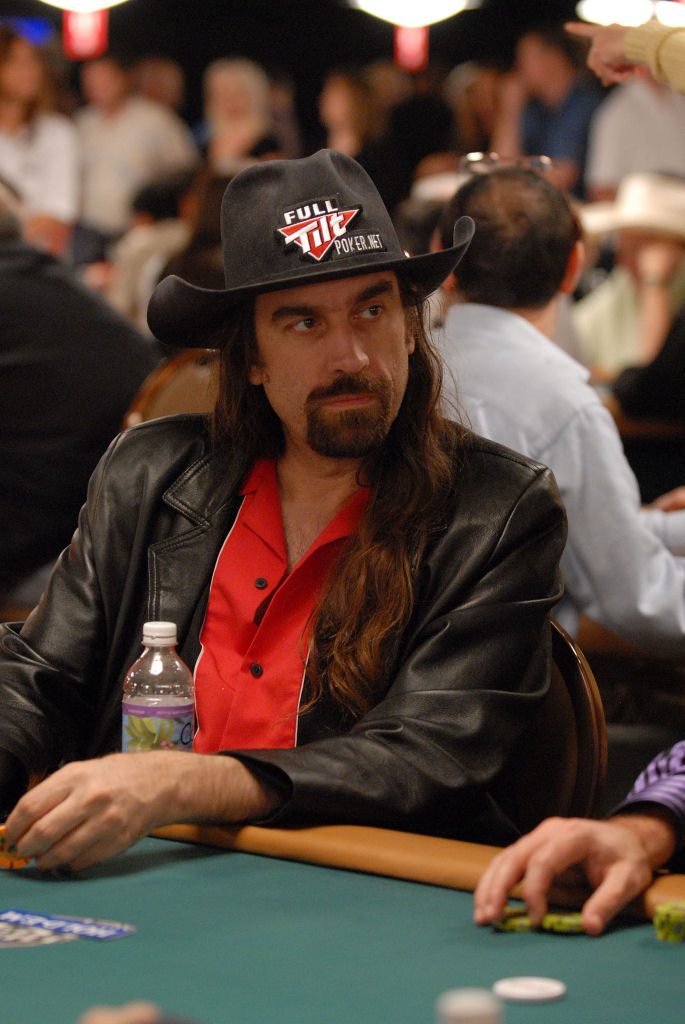
- Ferguson at the 2007 World Series of Poker
- Nickname: Jesus
- Born: Christopher Philip Ferguson; April 11, 1963 (age 63); Los Angeles, California, U.S.

World Series of Poker
- Bracelets: 6
- Money finishes: 168
- Highest WSOP Main Event finish: Winner, 2000

World Poker Tour
- Title: None
- Final tables: 2
- Money finishes: 11

European Poker Tour
- Money finish: 1

Christopher Philip Ferguson (born April 11, 1963) is an American retired professional poker player. He has won six World Series of Poker events, including the 2000 WSOP Main Event, and the 2008 NBC National Heads-Up Poker Championship. Ferguson is a computer scientist by training and education.

On September 20, 2011, the U.S. Justice Department filed a motion to amend a civil complaint, with the belief that Ferguson and three other directors for the popular poker client Full Tilt Poker were running a Ponzi scheme that paid out $444 million of customer money to themselves and the firm's owners.

== Early life and education ==
Ferguson was born in Los Angeles, California. Both Ferguson's parents have doctoral degrees in mathematics and his father, Thomas S. Ferguson, teaches game theory and theoretical probability at UCLA.

Ferguson attended UCLA, where he earned a Ph.D. in computer science (focusing on virtual network algorithms) in 1999 after five years as an undergraduate and 13 years as a graduate student. His Ph.D. advisor was Leonard Kleinrock. While at UCLA Ferguson appeared on the Ricky Jay Television Special "Learned Pigs and Fireproof Women" as an assistant.

== Poker career ==
Ferguson began playing poker at the age of 10. In college, he honed his skill on IRC poker playing online for play money in chat rooms. In 1994, he began playing in tournaments in California and in 1995, he entered his first World Series of Poker. He is a relatively quiet player who often adopts a characteristic motionless pose to avoid providing information to his opponents. He adopted his trademark wide-brimmed hat and sunglasses consciously, to point towards a table image that does not display outright the fact that he was a college student. Ferguson is nicknamed "Jesus" because of his trademark long brown hair and beard. His style is highly mathematical, using a strong knowledge of game theory and developing computer simulations to improve his understanding of the game.

In the 2000 WSOP Ferguson won his first bracelet in the $2,500 Seven-Card Stud event for $151,000. He followed this up by defeating T. J. Cloutier heads-up at the Main Event to win the $1.5 million prize. In 2004, he earned $120,000 in the Main Event for his 26th-place finish (out of 2,576 players).

Ferguson finished runner-up to Phil Hellmuth in the 2005 National Heads-Up Poker Championship. He made the finals again in 2006, but again finished second, this time to Ted Forrest. In 2008, he made the finals for the third time, this time defeating Andy Bloch and winning the title.

At the 2017 WSOP, Ferguson set a record with 23 cashes. He also won his sixth bracelet, and first in 14 years, at the WSOP Europe in the €1,650 Pot Limit Omaha Hi-Lo 8 or Better event. With these results Ferguson won the WSOP Player of the Year award.

As of September 2020, his total live tournament winnings exceed $9,500,000. His 168 WSOP cashes account for over $6,800,000 of those winnings.

=== World Series of Poker bracelets ===
Year	Tournament	Prize ($)
2000	$2,500 Seven-Card Stud	$151,000
2000	$10,000 No Limit Texas Hold 'em World Championship	$1,500,000
2001	$1,500 Omaha Hi-Lo Split Eight or Better	$164,735
2003	$2,000 Omaha Hi-Lo Split Eight or Better	$123,680
2003	$2,000 1/2 Limit Hold'em – 1/2 Seven Card Stud	$66,220
2017E	€1,650 Pot Limit Omaha Hi-Lo 8 or Better	€39,289

An "E" following a year denotes bracelet(s) won at the World Series of Poker Europe

In addition to his six bracelets, Ferguson was the first player to have won three World Series of Poker Circuit rings.

== Full Tilt Poker scandal ==
In 2004, Ferguson co-founded the online poker site Full Tilt Poker. On September 20, 2011, the United States Department of Justice amended an existing civil complaint against Full Tilt Poker, alleging that directors Chris Ferguson, Howard Lederer, and Rafe Furst "lined their own pockets with funds picked from the pockets of their most loyal customers while blithely lying to both players and the public alike about the safety and security of the money deposited." A lawyer for Ferguson denied the allegations, suggesting that the issues may have been the result of mismanagement not malice. The legality of online poker is at present being challenged by state legislation therein. His court case was dismissed on February 19, 2013, and no further legal action was, nor is, pending.

== Personal life ==
Ferguson's interests include being president of a swing dancing club at UCLA, as well as his ability to throw playing cards fast enough to cut through bananas, carrots and even melons. His card throwing ability was showcased on a side segment called ‘The Nuts’ on the ESPN broadcast of the World Series of Poker.
