= Steffen Sontheimer =

German poker player (born 1990)

- Nickname: go0se.core!
- Born: 13 September 1990 (age 36); Gernsbach, Germany

World Series of Poker
- Final tables: 2
- Money finishes: 10

World Poker Tour
- Money finish: 1

European Poker Tour
- Money finish: 1

Steffen Christian Sontheimer (born 13 September 1990) is a German professional poker player, originally from Gernsbach, Germany who focuses on poker tournaments and cash games. He plays online on PokerStars under the alias go0se.core!.

== Poker ==
Sontheimer plays online poker under the alias "go0se.core!" on PokerStars (where he had the supernova elite status for two years) and "Partygo0se" on partypoker.

He decided to become a professional poker player during a trip to Canada to play Scoops in May 2014 alongside Reiner Kempe, Fedor Holz, and a few others.

Sontheimer first cashed in live tournament in the summer of 2015. One year later he started competing in high roller tournaments. Professional poker player Fedor Holz, predicted that 2017 would be a "breakout year" for Sontheimer. Later that year Sontheimer won the inaugural Poker Masters Purple Jacket winning $2,733,000 in the process.

In 2017, he took down the very first Poker Masters Purple Jacket, the grand prize of the new high roller tournament series.

In 2018, Sontheimer won the Caribbean Poker Party $250,000 Super High Roller Championships earning him $3,685,000.

Sontheimer helped poker player Kitty Kuo improve her game. He has been described as a "crusher".

Sontheimer along with Holz is a shareholder of No Limit Gaming, an esports organisation founded by Stefan Schillhabel. He regularly streams poker for the organization.

He is a member of the poker and e-sports team NoLimitGG.

As of August 2020, Sontheimer is 6th on the German all-time money list with career live tournament winnings of over $13,700,000.

== Personal life ==
Steffen Sontheimer studied industrial engineering at the Karlsruhe Institute of Technology.

He is close friends with many famous German poker players, including Fedor Holz, Stefan Schillhabel and others.
