= Dominik Nitsche =

German poker player (born 1990)

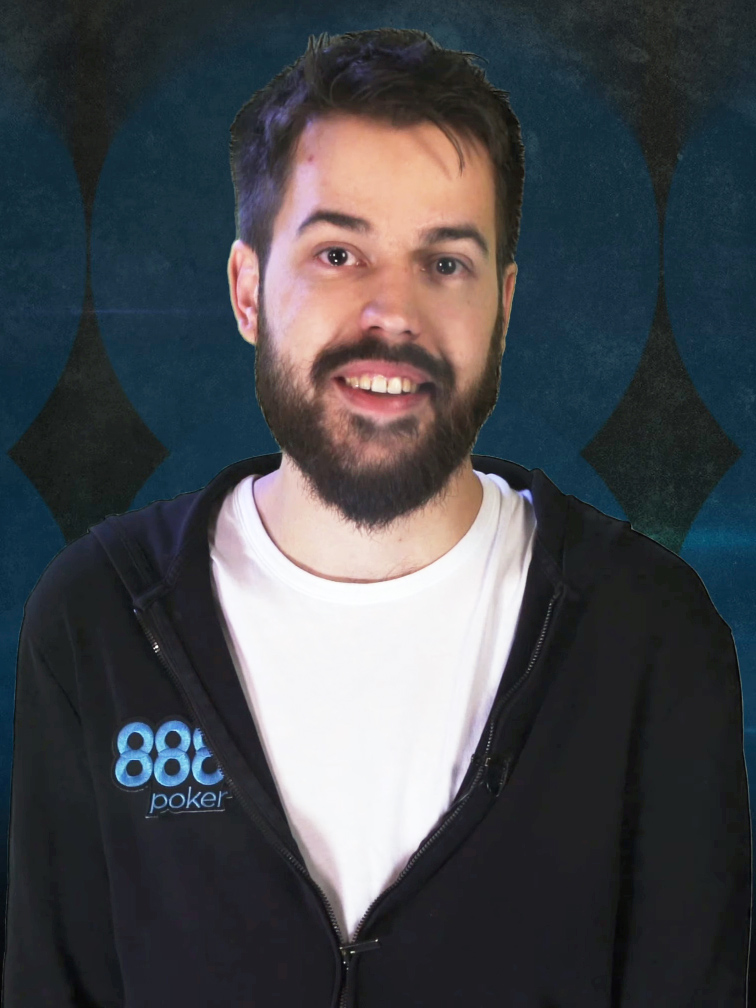
- Dominik Nitsche in 2018
- Nicknames: Bounatirou (PokerStars), JustLuck1337 (Full Tilt)

World Series of Poker
- Bracelets: 4
- Money finishes: 33
- Highest WSOP Main Event finish: 195th, 2017

World Poker Tour
- Title: 1
- Final tables: 3
- Money finishes: 6

European Poker Tour
- Title: None
- Final table: None
- Money finishes: 6

Dominik Nitsche (born 1990) is a professional poker player, originally from Minden, Germany but now residing in Edinburgh, Scotland.

Nitsche began playing poker online in 2006, amassing winnings exceeding $3 million. In 2009, playing in his first live poker tournament, he won a Latin American Poker Tour event in Mar del Plata, Argentina, earning $381,000. In 2012 he won his first World Series of Poker bracelet, outlasting a field of 4,620 in a $1,000 No Limit Hold'em tournament and earning $654,000. Later that same year he won a World Poker Tour title in South Africa. The next year he made the final table of the same tournament before finishing in 4th place.

In 2014 Nitsche added two WSOP bracelets. First, he won the WSOP National Championship for $352,000. He then won another $1,000 NLHE tournament, becoming at age 23 the youngest player to win 3 bracelets (Phil Ivey was 26 when he won his third). He also made the final table of the WSOP Europe Main Event in 2013, finishing in 3rd place.

At the 2017 WSOPE Nitsche won his fourth bracelet in the €111,111 High Roller for One Drop event. The prize of €3,487,463 ($4,064,000) was his largest career cash. As of 2018, his live tournament winnings exceed $14,600,000.

== Early life ==
As a child, Dominik Nitsche wanted to be a professional footballer. However, he realized that he was not a good fit for sports, but that he excelled at maths. At the age of 16, Nitsche downloaded his first poker softwares, and started playing online under his mother’s name.

== World Series of Poker Bracelets ==
Year	Tournament	Prize (US$)
2012	$1,000 No Limit Hold'em	$654,797
2014	$10,000 WSOP National Championship	$352,800
2014	$1,000 No Limit Hold'em	$335,659
2017E	€111,111 High Roller for One Drop No Limit Hold'em	€3,487,463

An "E" following a year denotes bracelet(s) won at the World Series of Poker Europe

== Online poker ==
Online, Dominik Nitsche plays under the screen name “Bounatirou” on PokerStars and “JustLuck1337” on Full Tilt when the platform still existed. On those two accounts, he’s amassed $7.045 million in online MTT cashes.

In May 2020, he won the SCOOP (Spring Championship of Online Poker) title on PokerStars.
