= Johan Guilbert =

French poker player (born 1989)

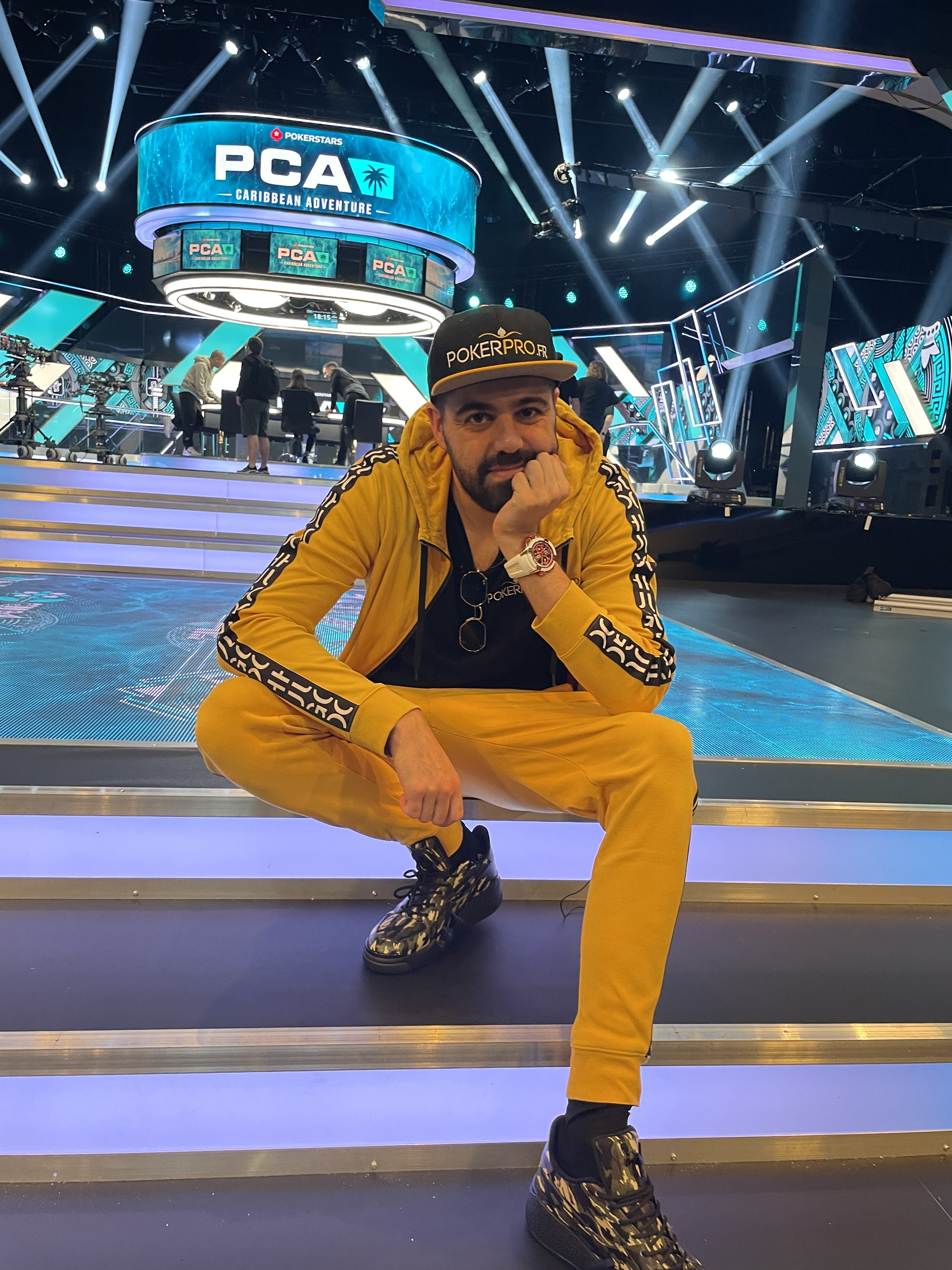
- Nickname: YoH ViraL
- Born: 19 April 1989 (age 37); Sarreguemines, Moselle, France

Johan Guilbert, also known as YoH ViraL, (born 19 April 1989, in Sarreguemines, Moselle, France) is a professional poker player.

== Biography ==
His first live poker tournament cash was in mid-December 2010 at the Aviation Club de France in Paris during a No Limit Hold’em event. He won his first live tournament at the end of January 2011, earning a prize of nearly €10,000. In July 2012, Johan Guilbert made his debut at the World Series of Poker (WSOP) at the Rio All-Suite Hotel and Casino in Paradise on the Las Vegas Strip and cashed in the Main Event. At the 2014 WSOP, he cashed once, and in 2016, he made two cashes.

In October 2016, he reached the final table of the Main Event of the Italian Poker Tour in Malta, finishing the tournament in fourth place, earning over €40,000. At the High Roller of the WSOP Circuit in Paris, he also finished fourth at the end of November 2017, receiving more than €50,000. In mid-April 2018, Guilbert finished ninth at the Partypoker Millions High Roller held in Barcelona, Spain, earning €60,000. At the 2019 WSOP, he cashed six times, and received his highest prize of nearly $130,000 for a second-place finish in a Shootout event.

In May 2021, he reached the final table twice at the Aria High Roller Series of the PokerGO Tour at the Aria Resort and Casino on the Las Vegas Strip, earning nearly $170,000. At the end of August 2021, he won the second tournament of the Super High Roller Series Europe in Kyrenia, Northern Cyprus, receiving over $500,000. Four days later, he reached another final table of the series and finished third in the sixth event, earning $560,000. He also reached the final table of the Super High Roller at Partypoker Millions North Cyprus in Kyrenia in September 2021, finishing fourth for about $110,000. In December 2021, he reached the final table of the Main Event of the World Series of Poker Europe at King's Resort in Rozvadov and finished second, earning nearly €800,000.

At the Global Poker Awards, Johan Guilbert received the Breakout Player of the Year 2021 award in mid-February 2022. In total, Johan Guilbert has won over $4 million in live poker tournaments.
