= Allen Kessler =

American poker player (born 1961)

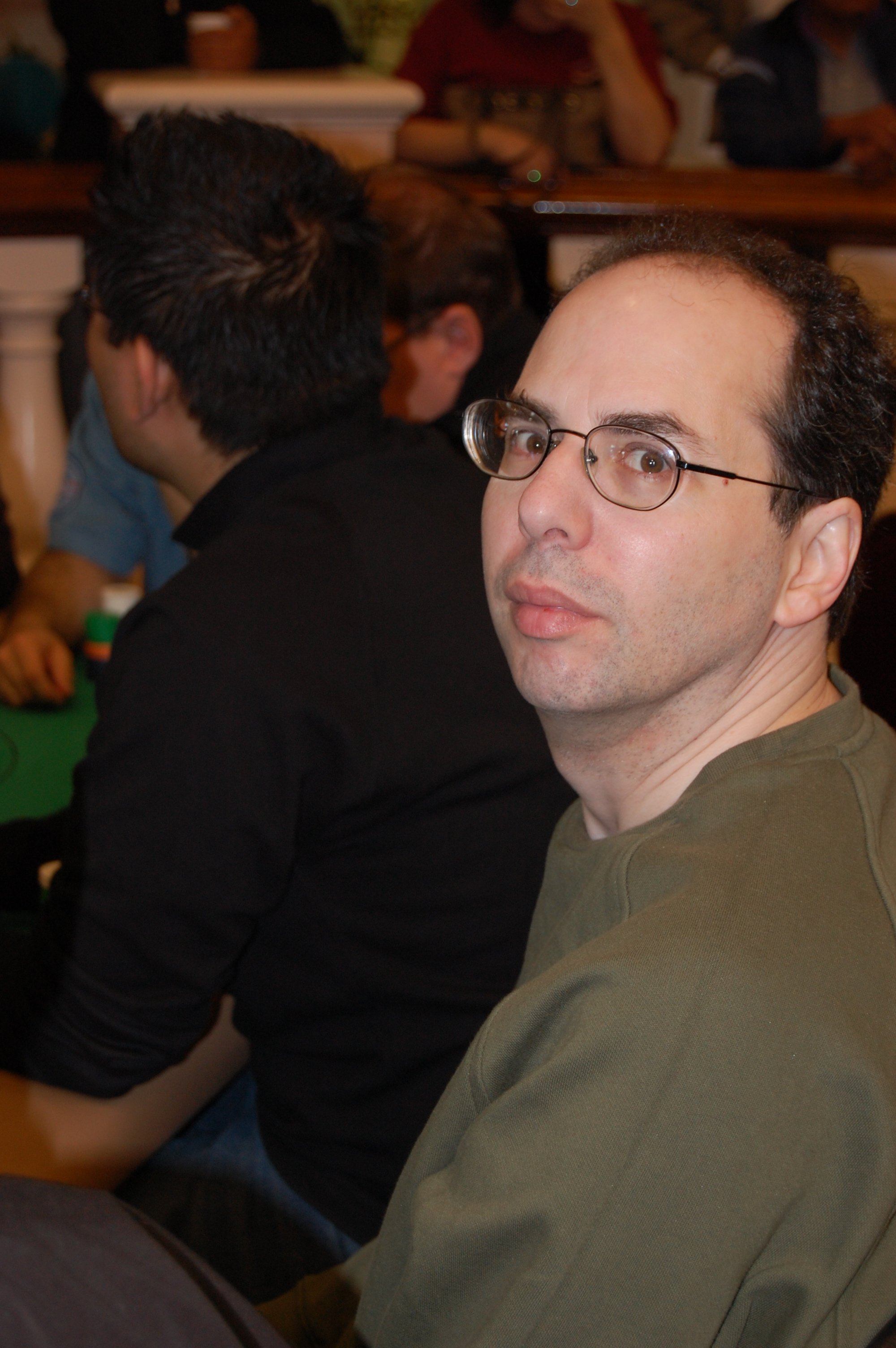
- Nickname: Chainsaw

World Series of Poker
- Bracelet: None
- Final tables: 7
- Money finishes: 101
- Highest WSOP Main Event finish: 320th, 2019

World Poker Tour
- Title: None
- Final tables: 2
- Money finishes: 27

Allen Kessler (born 20 December, 1961) is an American professional poker player now residing in Las Vegas, Nevada. He is ranked 10th in All Time Total Cashes with 363 tournament cashes as recorded in the Global Poker Index. These include 69 WSOP cashes, 12 WSOP Europe cashes and 91 WSOP Circuit cashes including 3 rings and 9 cashes in the 2010 World Series of Poker, the most cashes of any player at the 2010 WSOP. Those 9 cashes include a 2nd-place finish. Kessler is also the Heartland Poker Tour Player of the Year for 2013. His career earnings exceed $3.87 million with an excess of $1.97 million in earnings at the WSOP and WSOP Circuit combined.

== Poker career ==
Kessler started playing poker in college and in the 1980s he spent time in Atlantic City playing slot machines. When the casinos offered poker in the 1990s, Kessler played high-stakes games with players like John Hennigan, Cyndy Violette, Nick Frangos, and Phil Ivey.

After years of experience at the cash tables he started playing tournament poker and in 2001 finished 16th in the 2001 WSOP $5,000 Omaha Hi-Lo Split 8 or Better. His first final table at the WSOP came in 2005 where he finished runner-up to Todd Brunson in the $2,500 Omaha Hi-Lo.

At the 2010 World Series of Poker (WSOP), Kessler had a total of nine cashes, setting the record for most cashes in that year's series. This included his biggest career cash of $276,485 when he finished runner-up to Frank Kassela in the $10,000 Seven Card Stud Hi-Lo 8 Championship. At the 2014 World Series of Poker he had five cashes including a final table appearance in the prestigious $50,000 Poker Players Championship.

Highlighted among his 15 documented live tournament wins are; Main Event Champion - 2009 Winter Bayou Poker Challenge and Main Event Champion - 2014 WSOPC at Foxwoods Casino.

In the 2006 L.A. Poker Classic he appeared in his first televised final table finishing 3rd in the WPT Invitiational - No Limit Hold'em event.

Kessler is the Heartland Poker Tour Player of the Year 2013. He earned this title without winning a single HPT event that year but cashing in 12 of 20 events for over $85,000, and making four final tables.

As of April 2025, his total live tournament winnings are $4,510,488.

== Nickname and other activities ==
Kessler was given the nickname "The Chainsaw" at a 2007 WPT Foxwoods Casino event. The Mid-State Poker Tour's Main Event tournament structure was designed by Kessler and is identified as "Chainsaw Approved".
