= King's Resort Rozvadov =

Casino and resort in Rozvadov, Czech Republic

King's Resort

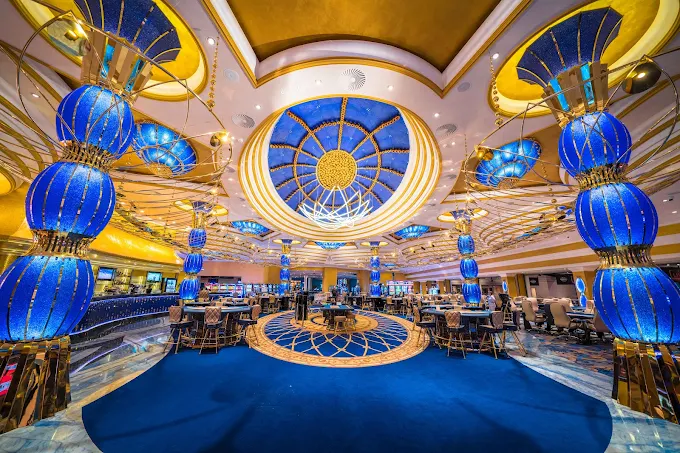
- Interactive map of King's Resort
- Location: Rozvadov, Czech Republic; Rozvadov 7, 34806 Rozvadov; 49°40′12″N 12°33′24.3″E
- Opened: 26 June 2003; 23 years ago
- No. of rooms: Approximately 400
- Gaming space: 64,584 sq ft (6,000.0 m^{2})
- Notable restaurants: Radimský
- Casino type: Land-based
- Website: kings-resort.com

King's Resort is a casino and resort located in Rozvadov, Czech Republic. The casino currently houses the largest poker room in Europe.

== History ==
In 2002, art collector and poker player Leon Tsoukernik decided to open a casino in the Czech Republic, close to the German border, benefiting from liberal Czech gambling laws. King's Casino Rozvadov opened on 26 June 2003.

Approximately two hundred thousand poker players played in the casino in 2014. Over €15 million was paid out to players in poker tournament price pools that year. Tsoukernik closed a deal with the organizers of the World Series of Poker for the first WSOP Circuit Festival hosted in the Czech Republic in 2015. In 2017 the Czech Republic took over hosting the WSOP Europe.

The 2017 €10,350 WSOPE Main Event was won by Marti Roca De Torres and the $111,111 One Drop High Roller was won by Dominik Nitsche. The 2018 €10,350 WSOPE Main Event was won by Jack Sinclair and the €100,000 Super High Roller was won by Martin Kabrhel.

In 2017, over thirty thousand players attended the WSOPE, making it the most successful WSOPE to date. The success of the Czech premiere led to a deal, which allows the WSOPE to take place in the Czech Republic annually until 2022, with further cooperation being open for discussion. The WSOPE Festivals had been held every second year.

In 2018, the King's Casino was renamed to King's Resort.

The casino hosted professional poker player Tony G's birthday in 2018, holding a €200,000 guaranteed PLO tournament.

== Casino ==
The gambling area measures 64,584 ft^{2} or 6,000 m^{2}. In 2009, the casino began focusing on poker. King's Casino has over 160 poker tables making it the largest poker room in Europe. Poker tournaments are offered daily with guaranteed prize pools ranging €3,000 and higher.

The casino features roulette, blackjack, baccarat, craps. Over 300 slot machines are also present on the casino floor.

The total capacity of the hotel is approximately 400 rooms. It is equipped with a Japanese, Turkish and Swedish sauna, as well as a fitness studio and swimming pool. An art gallery is located between the hotel and gambling area with 25 art pieces, featuring the Warhol paintings Daimler Motorkutsche (1886) and Benz Patent-Motorwagen (1886) from the Cars series, a Swarovski armchair, and works by Václav Radimský and Tony Cragg.
