= Sibaya Casino and Entertainment Kingdom =

Entertainment complex near uMhlanga, South Africa

- Interactive map of Sibaya Casino and Entertainment Kingdom
- Location: near uMhlanga and eMdloti, South Africa; 1 Sibaya Drive, uMhlanga Rocks, 4320; 29.6819°S 31.1002°E
- Casino type: Land-based
- Owner: Sun International
- Website: www.suninternational.com

Sibaya Casino and Entertainment Kingdom is an entertainment complex situated just north of uMhlanga and south-west of eMdloti on the North Coast of KwaZulu-Natal, South Africa.

Sibaya, owned by resort hotel chain and casino destination, Sun International is one of the only two casinos within the Greater Durban metropolitan area with the other one being Suncoast located in the city.

== Design ==
The casino was named Sibaya (Zulu meaning for "kraal") due to its main design and architecture centred around the Zulu culture, displaying the contemporary interpretation of African tribal designs based on traditional Zulu kraal imagery.

Its most notable Zulu-inspired architecture is its massive central domed structure is encircled by eight satellite structures with their own identities.

== Building components ==
Sibaya consists of the casino, two hotels- Sibaya Lodge and Royal Sibaya, foodcourt, a conference centre, Izimbo Conference Centre and a 577-seater Afro-chic theatre, iZulu Theatre.

== Access ==
Sibaya has a single access way, Sibaya Drive linking the casino with the N2 interchange (Exit 188) to the west and the M4 to the east. The N2 highway runs north to the King Shaka International Airport and KwaDukuza and south to Durban, while the M4 runs north to eMdloti and Ballito and south to uMhlanga and Durban.

== See also ==
- List of casinos in South Africa
