= London International =

- London International Financial Futures and Options Exchange
- University of London International Programmes
- London International Airport
- London Clubs International
- London International, a subsidiary label of London Records
