= Emerald Resort & Casino =

South African hotel and casino

- Interactive map of Emerald Resort & Casino
- Location: Vanderbijlpark, Emfuleni, South Africa; 777 Frikkie Meyer Blvd, Vanderbijlpark, 1900, South Africa; 26.74274°S 27.85771°E
- Opened: 1997; 29 years ago
- Owner: Tsogo Sun (55%)
- Website: www.emeraldcasino.co.za

Emerald Resort & Casino is a hotel and casino located at a private estate on the banks of the Vaal River in Vanderbijlpark, South Africa. The casino opened in 1997.

== Ownership ==
The Emerald Resort & Casino was majority-owned by London Clubs International, a London-based casino operator that in 2006 became a division of Harrah's Entertainment (later Caesars Entertainment). In May 2019, Caesars announced the sale of their 70% interest (the remaining 30% stake is owned by local minority partners) to Peermont Hotels, a Johannesburg-based hospitality and entertainment company. The deal was initially expected to close in the third quarter of 2019, but it was never completed. In July 2021, Caesars sold the entire London Clubs chain to Metropolitan Gaming. In 2022, Metropolitan Gaming sold its stake in the Emerald Resort and Casino to a group led by Tsogo Sun and Keystone Investments.

== Events ==
Emerald regularly hosts boxing matches as well as the South African Heavyweight Championship. On February 23, 2018, reigning heavyweight champion Osborne 'Big Daddy' Machimana was defeated by knockout in the 6th round by Ruann 'Giant King' Visser. The casino also hosted the first World Series of Poker Africa in 2010.

== Gaming ==
The casino offers over 430 slot machines and 22 gaming tables including baccarat, five blackjack tables, nine roulette wheels and two poker tables in the smoking and non smoking sections. It also has a computer gaming area for kids.

== See also ==
- List of Caesars Entertainment properties
- List of casinos in South Africa
