= List of casinos in South Africa =

This is a list of casinos in South Africa. Most casinos in South Africa are owned and operated by 3 companies, Tsogo Sun, Sun International and Peermont Global.

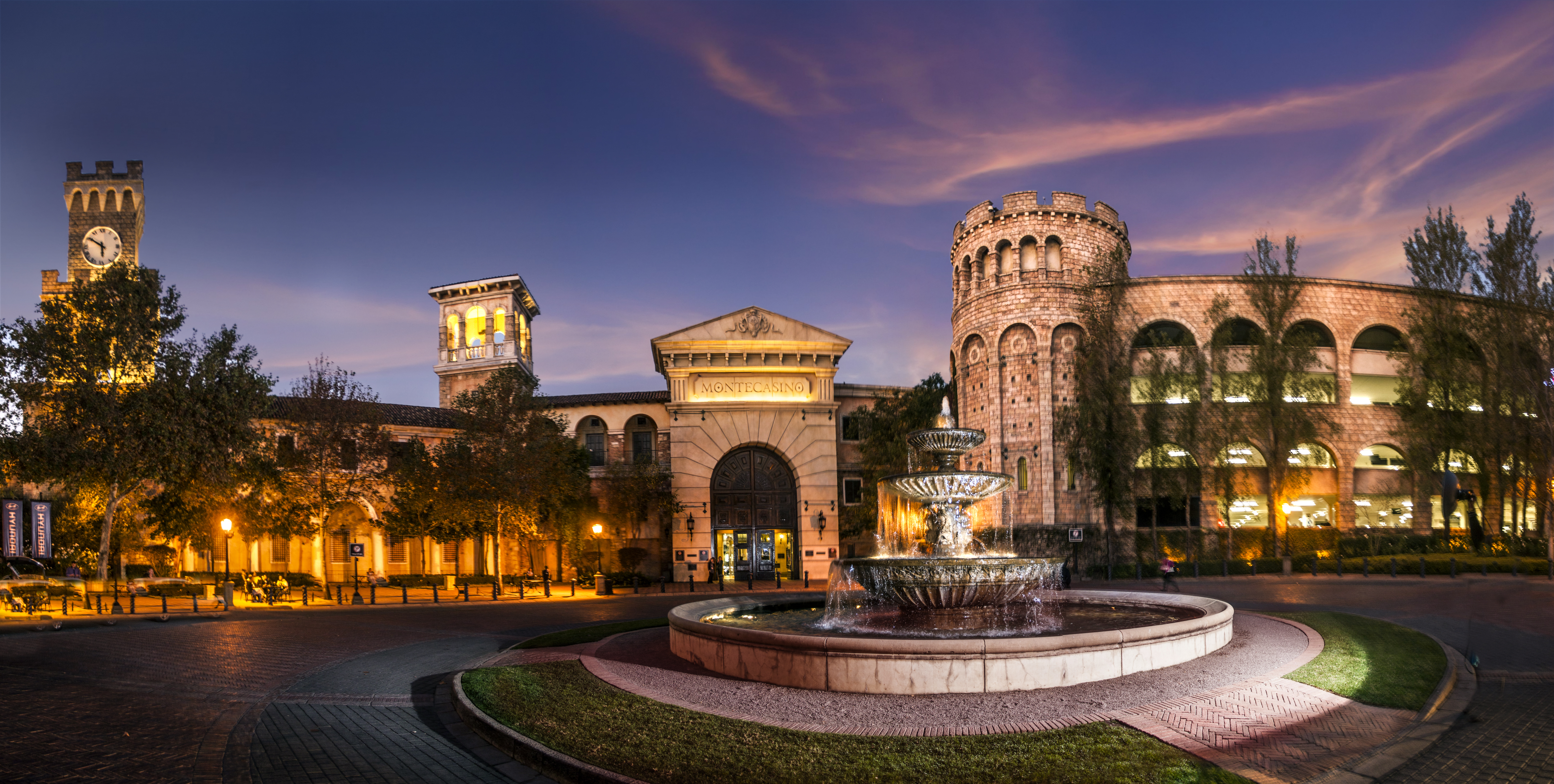
Montecasino, Fourways Johannesburg

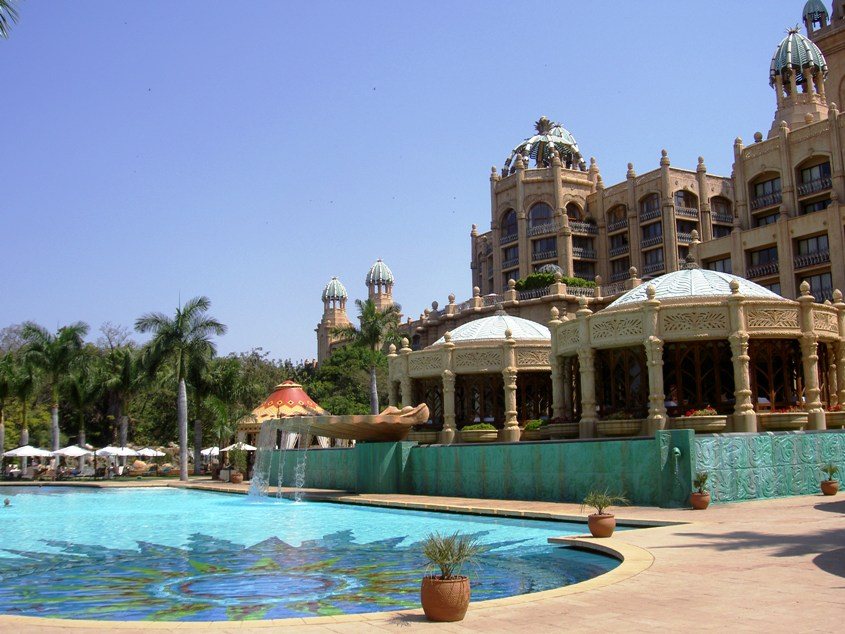
Sun City Resort

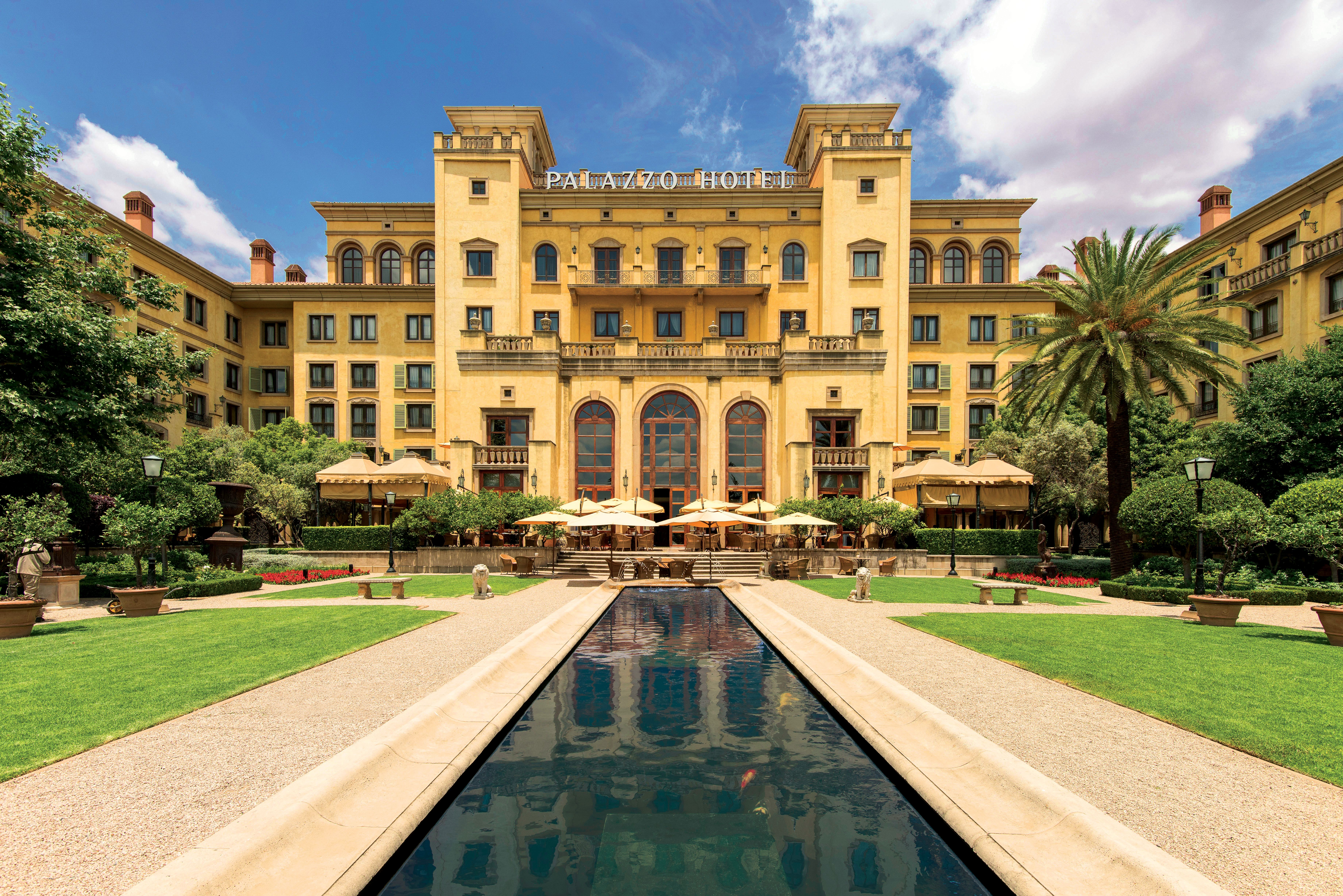
Palazzo Hotel Montecasino, Fourways Johannesburg

== List of casinos ==
Casino	Province	Owner	Coordinates	Ref
Montecasino	Gauteng	Tsogo Sun	26.0249°S 28.0122°E	https://www.montecasino.co.za/
Gold Reef City Casino & Theme Park	Gauteng	Tsogo Sun	26.235°S 28.0144°E	https://www.goldreefcity.co.za/
Silverstar Casino	Gauteng	Tsogo Sun	26.0957°S 27.8324°E	https://www.silverstar.co.za/
Emerald Resort & Casino	Gauteng	Tsogo Sun	26.7221°S 27.8432°E	https://emeraldcasino.co.za/
The Marco Polo	Gauteng	Tsogo Sun	26.1042°S 28.0543°E	https://themarcopolo.co.za/
Suncoast Casino, Hotels & Entertainment	KwaZulu-Natal	Tsogo Sun	29.8262°S 31.036°E	https://www.suncoastcasino.co.za/
Golden Horse Caisno	KwaZulu-Natal	Tsogo Sun	29.6063°S 30.3806°E	https://www.goldenhorsecasino.co.za/
Blackrock Casino	KwaZulu-Natal	Tsogo Sun	27.7579°S 29.929°E	https://www.blackrockcasino.co.za/
The Ridge Casino	Mpumalanga	Tsogo Sun	25.8703°S 29.2179°E	https://www.theridge.co.za/
Emnotweni	Mpumalanga	Tsogo Sun	25.4467°S 30.9701°E	https://www.emnotweni.co.za/
Hemingways Casino	Eastern Cape	Tsogo Sun	32.9661°S 27.9116°E	https://www.hemingways.co.za/
Garden Route Casino	Western Cape	Tsogo Sun	34.1583°S 22.0914°E	https://www.gardenroutecasino.co.za/
The Caledon Casino	Western Cape	Tsogo Sun	34.2251°S 19.428°E	https://www.thecaledoncasino.co.za/
Mykonos Casino	Western Cape	Tsogo Sun	33.0715°S 18.0387°E	https://www.mykonoscasino.co.za/
Goldfields Casino	Free State	Tsogo Sun	28.2354°S 26.8634°E	https://www.goldfieldscasino.co.za/
Boardwalk Hotel, Casino & Convention Centre	Eastern Cape	Sun International	33.9729°S 25.6545°E	https://www.suninternational.com/boardwalk
Wild Coast Sun	Eastern Cape	Sun International	31.0656°S 30.1923°E	https://www.suninternational.com/wild-coast-sun/
Windmill Casino	Free State	Sun International	29.1481°S 26.2283°E	https://www.suninternational.com/windmill/
Time Square Casino	Gauteng	Sun International	25.8013°S 28.2792°E	https://www.suninternational.com/time-square/
Carnival City	Gauteng	Sun International	26.2667°S 28.3061°E	https://www.suninternational.com/carnival-city/
Meropa Casino	Limpopo	Sun International	23.9106°S 29.4689°E	https://www.suninternational.com/meropa/
Flamingo Casino	Northern Cape	Sun International	28.7455°S 24.76°E	https://www.suninternational.com/flamingo/
Sibaya Casino	KwaZulu-Natal	Sun International	29.6884°S 31.0992°E	https://www.suninternational.com/sibaya/
GrandWest Casino & Entertainment World	Western Cape	Sun International	33.918°S 18.5251°E	https://www.suninternational.com/grandwest/
Sun City Resort	North West	Sun International	25.348°S 27.095°E	https://www.suninternational.com/sun-city/
Golden Valley Casino	Western Cape	Sun International	33.6791°S 19.4463°E	https://www.suninternational.com/golden-valley/
Emperors Palace	Gauteng	Peermont Global	26.1436°S 28.2204°E	https://emperorspalace.com/
Frontier Inn and Casino	Free State	Peermont Global	28.217°S 29.0861°E	https://frontierinn.co.za/
Graceland Hotel, Casino & Country Club	Mpumalanga	Peermont Global	26.5052°S 29.1187°E	https://graceland.co.za/
Khoroni Hotel Casino Convention Resort	Limpopo	Peermont Global	22.94°S 30.485°E	https://khoroni.co.za/
Mmabatho Palms Hotel Casino and Conference Resort	North West	Peermont Global	25.8408°S 25.6104°E	https://mmabathopalms.co.za/
Rio Hotel Casino and Convention Resort	North West	Peermont Global	26.7052°S 27.0887°E	https://riocasino.co.za/
Thaba Moshate Hotel Casino and Convention Resort	Limpopo	Peermont Global	24.6701°S 30.1564°E	https://thabamoshate.co.za/
Umfolozi Hotel Casino Convention Resort	KwaZulu-Natal	Peermont Global	28.733°S 31.883°E	https://umfolozicasino.co.za/
Desert Palace & Casino Resort	Northern Cape	Independent	28.5543°S 21.2465°E	https://www.desertpalace.co.za/
Mayfair Casino	Eastern Cape	Independent	33.9357°S 25.587°E	https://www.mayfaircasino.co.za/
Queens Casino and Hotel	Eastern Cape	Independent	32.9718°S 27.3844°E	https://www.queenscasino.co.za/
The Grand Oasis Casino	Northern Cape	Tsogo Sun	28.4711°S 21.2386°E	https://oasiscasino.co.za/

== See also ==
- List of casinos
- List of tourist attractions worldwide
