= North Beach (Durban) =

Beach in South Africa

Coordinates: 29.8488°S 31.0386°E

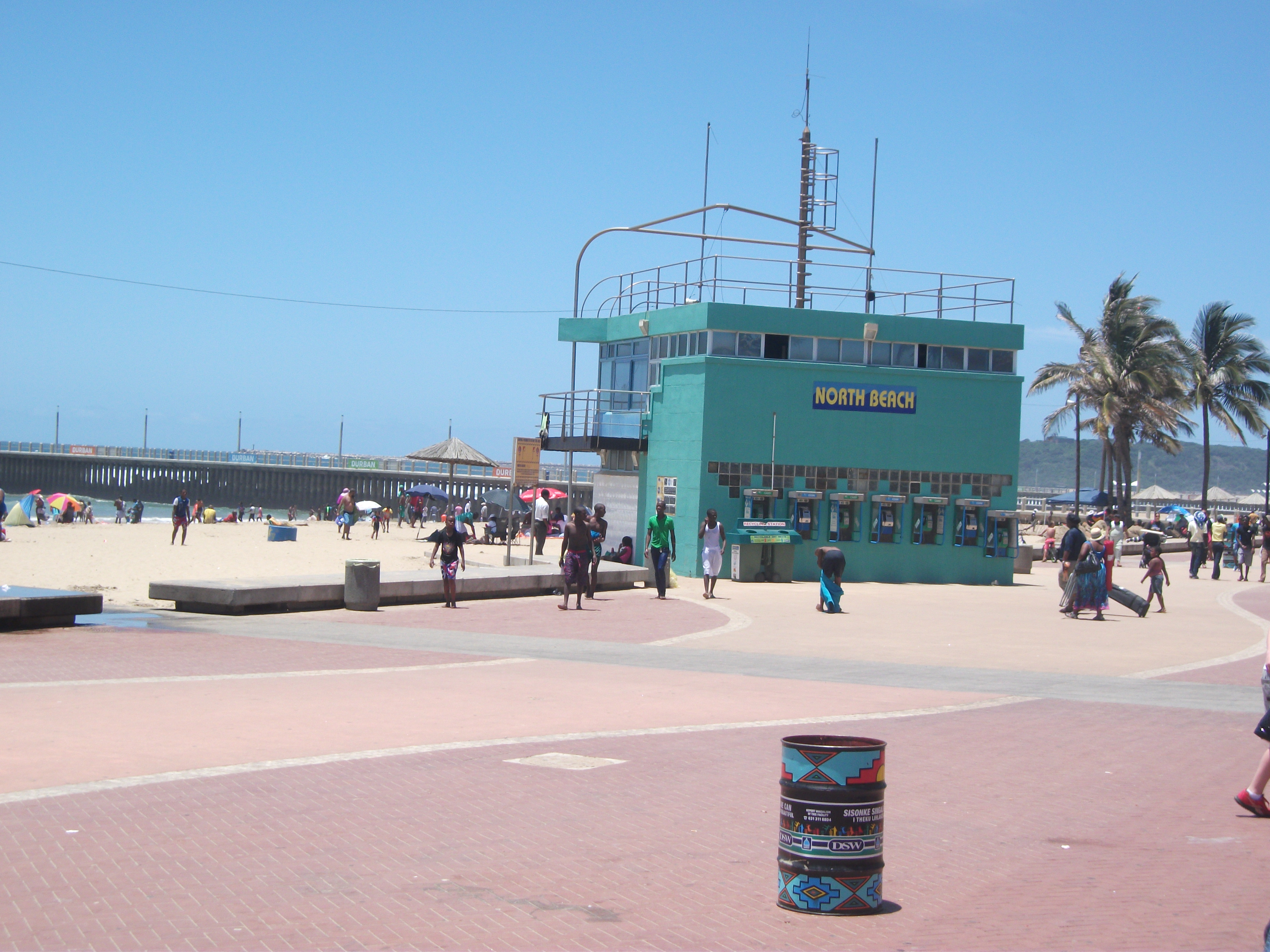
North Beach in Durban.jpeg

North Beach is one of the beaches of Durban, South Africa. It is situated north of the harbour and bluff, in between Bay of Plenty and Dairy Beach on Durban's Golden Mile.

North Beach is one of the main beaches in Durban and is cared for by the Durban Surf Lifesaving Club. The clubhouse features prominently on the Marine Parade. The beach itself is flanked by two large piers and is accessible from the Marine Parade that stretches along the Golden Mile.

== Attractions ==
Due to its good surf conditions, Durban and North Beach is an ideal holiday and tourist destination. North Beach provides facilities for surfing, body boarding, paddle ski, skateboarding and plain swimming and sun bathing. During the festive season, the beaches are flooded by holidaymakers and tourists.

North Beach has a number of restaurants in its immediate vicinity.

The beaches are protected by a series of shark nets and patrolled by lifesavers.

== See also ==
- North Beach, Durban, the residential area of equal name, with population statistics.
