= Metropolitan Gaming =

British gaming company

- Formerly: London Clubs International; Caesars Entertainment EMEA
- Industry: Gaming, hospitality
- Founded: 1981
- Headquarters: London, England
- Products: Casinos
- Owner: Silver Point Capital
- Website: metropolitangaming.com

Metropolitan Gaming is a British gaming company that operates eleven casinos in the United Kingdom and Egypt. It is owned by Silver Point Capital. The casinos began as part of Grand Metropolitan, and later became an independent company, London Clubs International. From 2006 to 2021, they were owned by Harrah's Entertainment and then Caesars Entertainment.

== History ==
London Clubs originated as a chain of casinos owned by the conglomerate Grand Metropolitan. In 1988, Grand Metropolitan decided to sell its casino division to focus on its core businesses of food, beverages, and retail. The next year, London Clubs became an independent company, when Grand Metropolitan sold an 80 per cent stake in the chain in a management buyout for £128 million. Its operations at the time comprised six casinos in London, one in France, and five on Cunard cruise ships.

In 1991, British gaming regulators opened an investigation of London Clubs, focusing on alleged violations of casino regulations and questionable backgrounds of some of the company's shareholders. The Gaming Board decided to oppose license renewals for the company's casinos in London. Ultimately, London Clubs was able to satisfy regulators by replacing its top management and arranging for shareholder David Shamoon to sell his stock, and the casinos' licenses were renewed.

LCI became a publicly traded company in 1994 when it was floated on the Unlisted Securities Market.

By 2001, LCI had developed severe financial problems, after its failed venture in the Aladdin Casino on the Las Vegas Strip. A combination of cost overruns, declining tourism, and poor design led to the casino filing bankruptcy in September 2001 and eliminating LCI's equity in the casino.

In 2006, London Clubs International was acquired by Harrah's Entertainment. Before being bought by Harrah's, LCI was in negotiations with Stanley Leisure (England's largest casino operator) about a possible merger, but the latter were outbid by Harrah's. Genting Group, a Malaysian gaming giant, was also interested in LCI. "London Clubs is an important strategic asset for foreign gaming companies wanting to establish a footprint in the UK ahead of deregulation," said Matthew Gerard of Investec Securities. Interest in British casinos had increased in 2006 due to legislation that allowed for larger "Vegas style" casinos.

At the time of purchase, LCI operated casinos in London, Southend, and Brighton, as well as in Egypt and South Africa. It also had licences to build five additional casinos.

LCI is best known for being the host of the World Series of Poker Europe (WSOPE). The World Series of Poker is the most prestigious poker tournament in the world, and the WSOPE was the first time it held an event outside of Las Vegas, Nevada. In 2007, Thomas Bihl became the first person to ever win a WSOP bracelet outside of Vegas. Bihl won the £2,500 World Championship H.O.R.S.E. at the World Series of Poker Europe at LCI. Days later, Annette Obrestad became the youngest player to ever win a WSOP bracelet at 18 years, 364 days, also becoming the first woman to win a World Series Main Event (Unlike Nevada, English gambling laws do not prohibit 18-year-olds from participating). Harrah's Casinos, the owner of the WSOP, considers the WSOP Europe bracelet to be the same in prestige as those awarded every year in Las Vegas.

While no definitive plans have been announced, Pollack indicated in February 2007 that other venues may start holding WSOP events. Egypt and South Africa were mentioned as possible expansion sites because Harrah's owns casinos, via LCI, in those two locations.

In 2010, Harrah's was renamed as Caesars Entertainment. Caesars was acquired in 2020 by Eldorado Resorts, which then changed its own name to Caesars Entertainment. By this time, the former London Clubs were known as Caesars Entertainment EMEA.

In July 2021, Caesars sold its EMEA division to the newly formed Metropolitan Gaming, an affiliate of Silver Point Capital, for a reported £15 million.

In 2022, Metropolitan sold the Emerald Resort & Casino in South Africa to a group led by Tsogo Sun, to focus its business on the United Kingdom and Egypt.

== Casinos ==
=== Egypt ===
- London Club Cairo
- The Ramses Casino Cairo
- The Kings and Queens Cairo

=== United Kingdom ===
- Alea Glasgow
- Alea Nottingham
- Empire Casino
- Manchester235
- Metropolitan Mayfair
- Park Lane Casino
- The Rendezvous Casino Brighton
- The Sportsman

=== Online ===
- MetGaming.com

=== Former properties ===
- Emerald Resort & Casino — Vanderbijlpark, South Africa — Sold in 2022.
