= World Series of Poker Africa =

Series of poker tournaments

The World Series of Poker Africa (WSOPA) is the second expansion effort of World Series of Poker-branded poker tournaments outside the United States. Since 1970, participants had to travel to Las Vegas if they wanted to compete in the World Series of Poker (WSOP). Although the WSOP started holding circuit events in 2005 in other states, the main tournaments, which awarded bracelets to the winners, were exclusively held in Las Vegas. In 2007, the inaugural World Series of Poker Europe marked the first time that a WSOP bracelet was awarded outside Las Vegas. In 2010, the WSOP expanded overseas once again, only this time to Gauteng, South Africa. While the WSOPE awarded bracelets, the WSOPA was considered a circuit event with the winners receiving Championship Rings instead of bracelets. The WSOPA did not occur in 2011, but the series of tournaments resumed in 2012.

== 2010 WSOPA ==
The first WSOPA was held in October 2010 at the Emerald Resort & Casino in Vanderbijlpark near Johannesburg, South Africa. Emerald Resort and Casino CEO Martin Rice said "Poker has, over the past half-decade, accelerated in popularity. Our Emerald Poker Series, and its growing fields, is testament to the unlimited success of the sport. It was only natural to follow-on its popularity with the greatest tournament on the planet." The tournament consisted of two events, which were a $1,100 Pot-Limit Omaha event with $300 rebuys and the $5,000 No Limit "Main Event."

Although the 2010 event was part of the WSOP Circuit, winners did not earn a gold ring or standing for the WSOP Circuit National Championship, both of which were common for other circuit events. This policy changed in 2012.

Event	First Prize	Winner
$1,100 Pot-Limit Omaha (Rebuy)	$36,786	Felipe Ramos
$5,000 No Limit Hold'em	$231,956	Warren Zackey

== 2012 WSOPA ==
The 2012 WSOPA was moved to 21–26 February and expanded to six circuit events, each of which counted towards Circuit National Championship standing and awarded a gold ring. In addition to the six ring events, the week included a Ladies No-Limit Tournament and a Celebrity Tournament. All events at the 2012 tournament were no-limit.

Five-time bracelet winner and former world champion Scotty Nguyen was the Master of Ceremonies.

Event	First Prize	Winner
$350 No-Limit Hold’em	$22,842	Gregory Ronaldson
$3,300 Main Event	$158,595	Joe-Boy Rahme
$10,400 High Roller No-Limit Hold'em	$97,000	Rob Fenner
$560 Six Handed No-Limit Hold'em	$25,979	Jason Strauss
$350 No-Limit Hold'em	$17,610	Armand Saayman
$350 Turbo No-Limit Hold'em	$7,784	Heau Pienaar

== 2013 World Series of Poker Africa ==
The 2013 WSOPA was moved to 5–10 February and expanded to seven circuit events, each of which counted towards Circuit National Championship standing and awarded a gold ring.

Event	First Prize	Winner
$365 No-Limit Hold’em	$20,018	Jarrod Solomon
$580 6-Handed No-Limit Hold'em	$12,920	Greg Tucker
$3,300 Main Event	$101,267	Michael Mizrachi
$580 No-Limit Hold'em	$19,741	Todd Neville
$10,400 High Roller No-Limit Hold'em	$38,400	Roman Szymonowicz
$365 Turbo No-Limit Hold'em	$7,753	Ahmed Karrim
