= Suncoast Casino and Entertainment World =

Entertainment complex in Durban, South Africa

Coordinates: 29°50′04″S 31°01′57″E

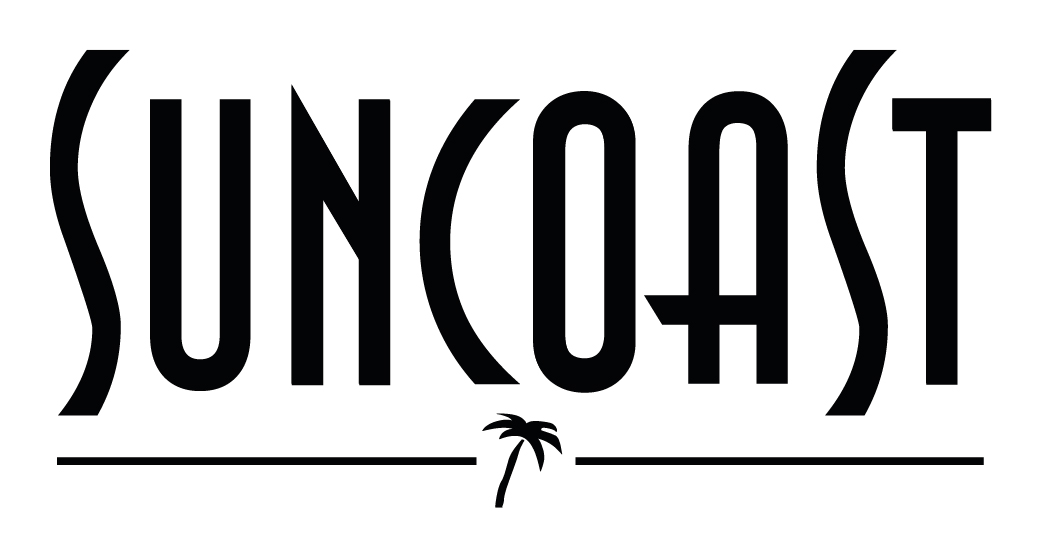

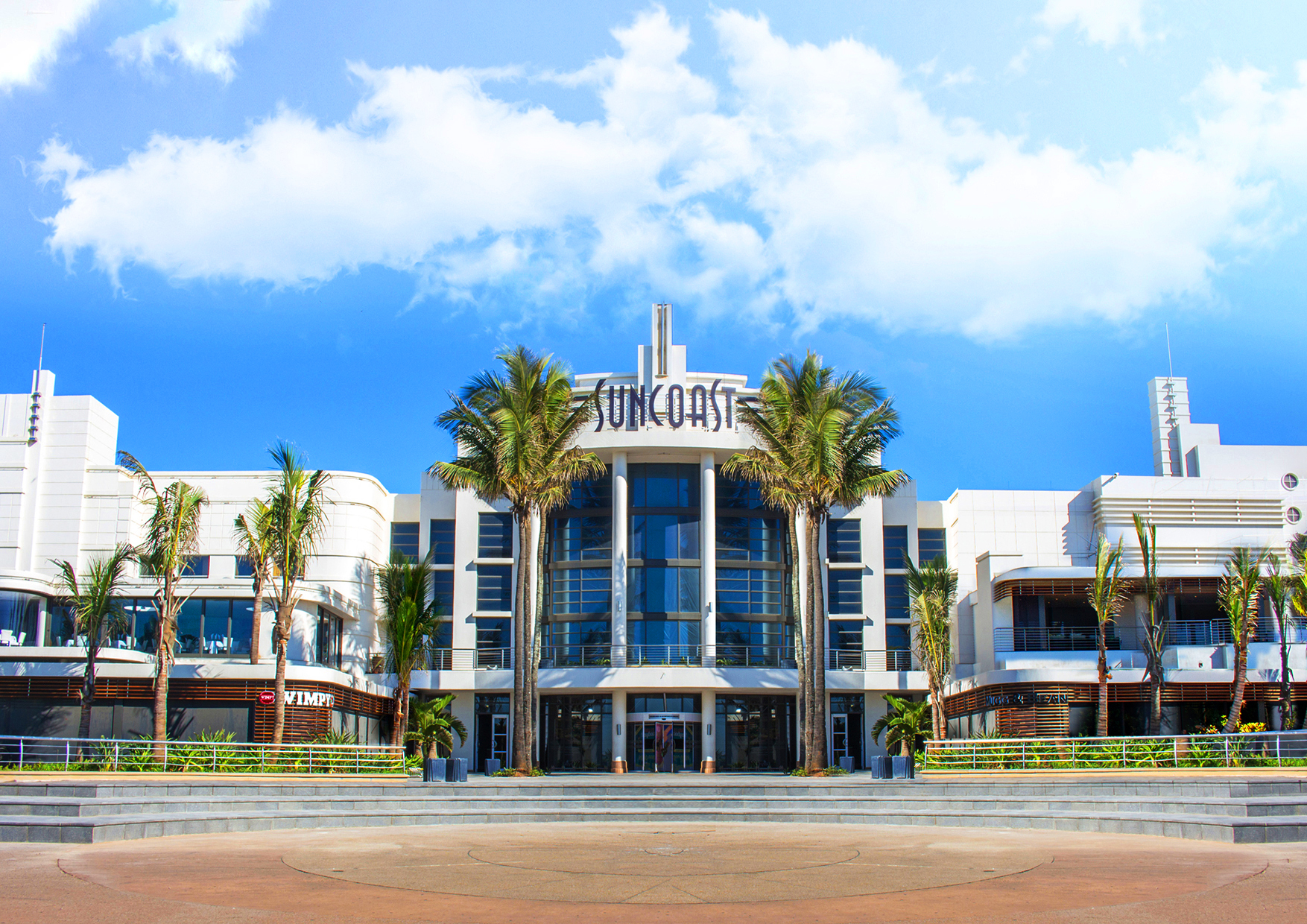
- Interactive map of Suncoast Casino, Hotels and Entertainment
- Location: Durban, KwaZulu-Natal, South Africa
- Opened: November 2002
- No. of rooms: 164
- Casino type: Land-based
- Owner: Tsogo Sun
- Website: tsogosun.com/suncoast-casino

Suncoast Casino, Hotels and Entertainment is an entertainment complex situated at the northern end of Durban's Golden Mile, adjacent to the Kings Park Sporting Precinct. Besides the casino, the complex houses many restaurants, a beach bar, cinemas and its own semi-private beach, which was rated as one of the top 3 beaches in South Africa. The design of the complex is aimed to complement the vast art deco heritage that is found across Durban. Suncoast houses the largest Casino complex in South Africa.

The casino is used by many recreational cyclists as a base for their training rides up the North Coast, as well as start of the Tour de Nandos cycle race in September, and the end of the Amashovashova National Classic in October. Furthermore, the A1 Grand Prix of Nations is held in the streets surrounding the casino during the end of January. This is the only street race in the entire A1 calendar.

Many restaurants are located within the complex, and the casino offers both smoking and non-smoking sections. Suncoast is owned wholly by Tsogo Sun.

== Accommodation ==
The accommodation affiliated with this casino is Suncoast Towers and SunSquare Suncoast.

== See also ==
- Gateway Theatre of Shopping
- List of casinos in South Africa
