= Sun International =

South African resort hotel chain

- Type: Public
- Traded as: JSE: SUI
- Industry: Gambling; Hospitality
- Founded: 11 July 1967; 59 years ago
- Founder: Sol Kerzner
- Headquarters: Sandton, Johannesburg, South Africa
- Area served: Southern Africa
- Key people: Ulrik Bengtsson (CEO) Norman Basthdaw (CFO)
- Revenue: ▲ R12.98B (2025)
- Net income: ▼ R1.62B (2025)
- Total assets: ▲ R13.64B (2025)
- Total equity: ▲ R3.67B (2025)
- Owner: Allan Gray (9.44%); PSG Financial Services (8.07%); Value Capital Partners H4 Q1 Hedge Fund (7.85%); Eskom Pension & Provident Fund (5.16%)
- Number of employees: ▼7,340 (2023)
- Subsidiaries: Sun City; SunWest (GrandWest); Sun Bet; Sun Slots; Sun Time Square; Sun Sibaya
- Website: suninternational.com sunbet.co.za

Sun International is a South African gambling and hospitality company, founded by Sol Kerzner in 1967.

Sun International owns diverse assets, including the Sun City resort in Ledig, in the North West Province, and the online betting platform SunBet.

Specialising in gambling and hospitality, the company has 49% of the South African casino market share, and owns or holds a significant interest in 11 out of the 38 operating casinos in South Africa.

== History ==
The hotel business traces its roots back to 1967, when the Southern Sun Hotel Company was created after South African Breweries and the South African businessman Sol Kerzner joined forces. By 1983, Southern Sun Hotels was operating a large portfolio of hotels in southern Africa.

In 1983, Kerzner broke away from South African Breweries, retaining Sun City and the other casino hotels located in the areas that South Africa had designated as "independent homelands", the business was named Sun International (South Africa). Southern Sun retained the company's other hotels in South Africa and remained focused on the hotel market rather than casinos.

In 1984, Sun International was listed on the Johannesburg Stock Exchange through Kersaf Investments Limited, which raised capital for expansions at Sun City.

In 2000, Southern Sun sold its stake in Sun International to Kersaf Investments Limited, which continued to acquire minority interests in Sun International.

In 2004, Kersaf Investments Limited merged with Sun International to form Sun International Limited, the company that exists today. In early 2015, Sun International sold its hotels in Botswana, Lesotho, Namibia and Zambia to Minor International. Since mid-2015, these have been run as hotels of the Avani Group. As of 2023, Sun International Limited owns or is involved in 13 hotels, casinos, and resorts.

== Properties ==
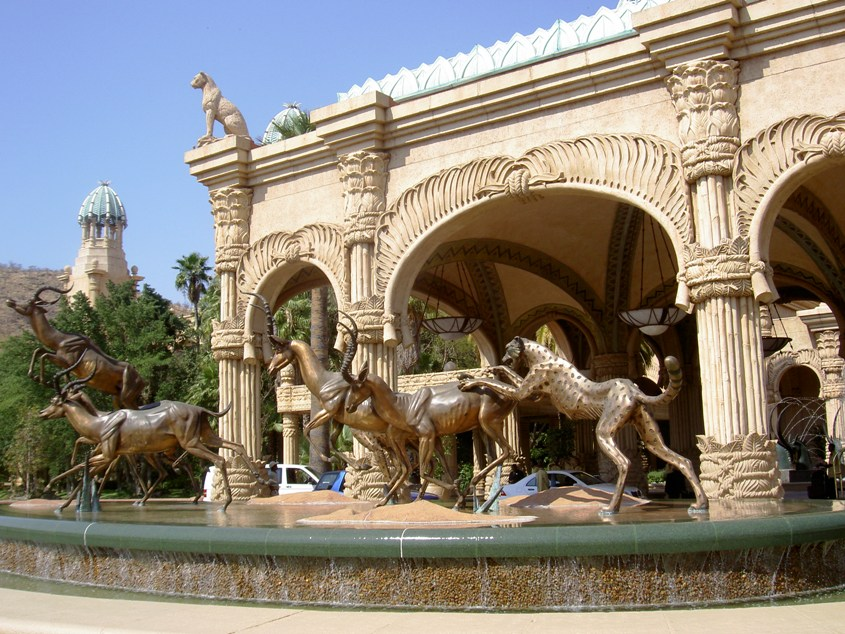
Sun City

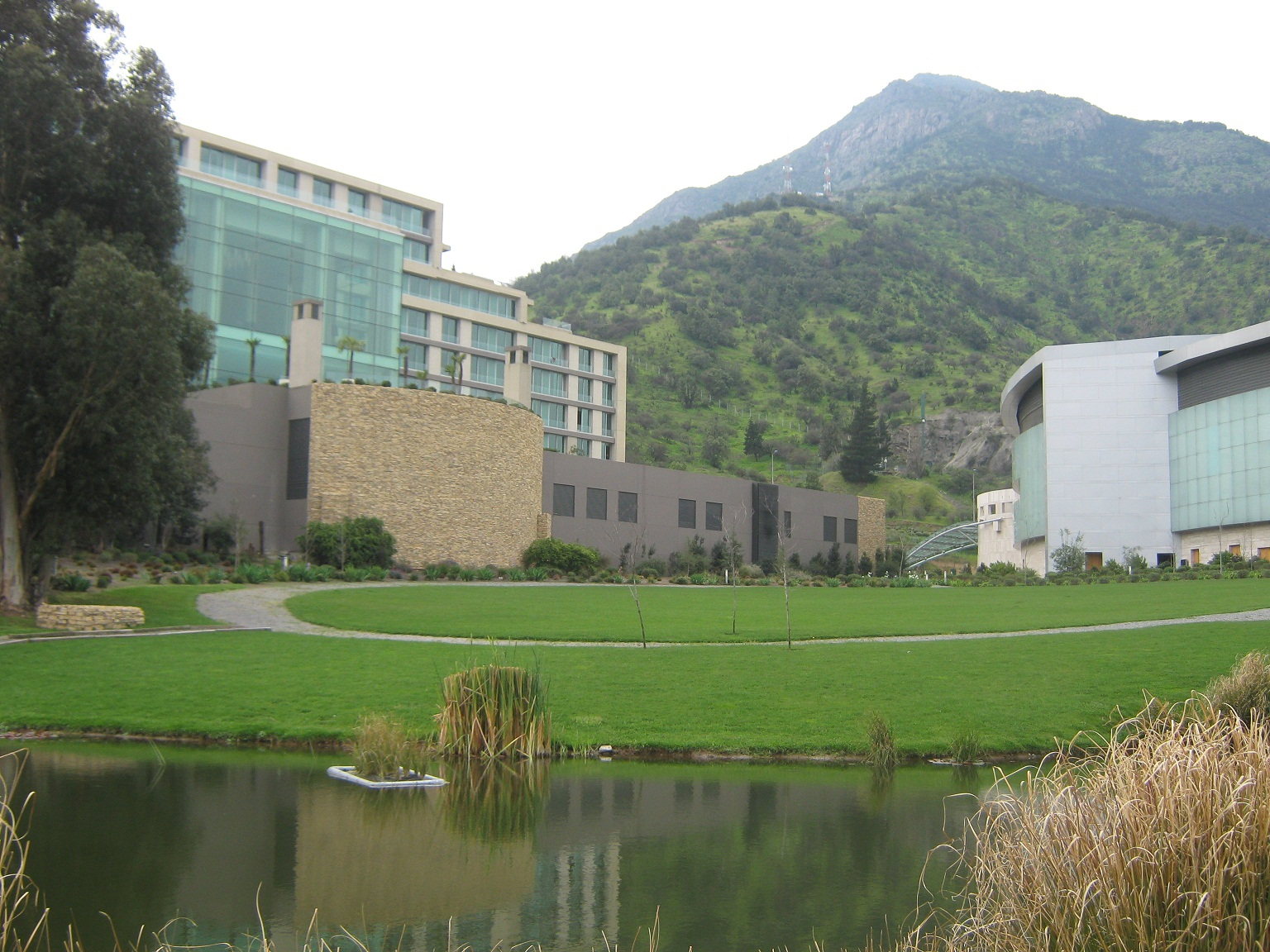
Sun Monticello in Chile

Sun International's operations include integrated resorts, luxury hotels, limited-payout machine slot routes, and casinos.

Country	Location	Resort
Chile	Mostazal	Sun Monticello
Nigeria	Lagos	The Federal Palace Hotel
South Africa	Brakpan	Carnival City Casino and Entertainment World
South Africa	Kimberley	Flamingo Casino
South Africa	Cape Town	Grand West Casino
South Africa	Worcester	Golden Valley Casino
South Africa	Polokwane	Meropa Casino and Entertainment World
South Africa	uMhlanga	Sibaya Casino and Entertainment Kingdom
South Africa	Ledig	Sun City
South Africa	Pretoria	Sun Bet Arena at Time Square Casino
South Africa	Port Elizabeth	The Boardwalk Casino and Entertainment World
South Africa	near Port Edward	Wild Coast Sun
South Africa	Bloemfontein	Windmill Casino and Entertainment Centre

Sun City Resort plays host to the Nedbank Golf Challenge annually.

== See also ==
- List of casinos in South Africa
