= Sun Monticello =

Hotel in Chile

Coordinates: 33.9214°S 70.7216°W

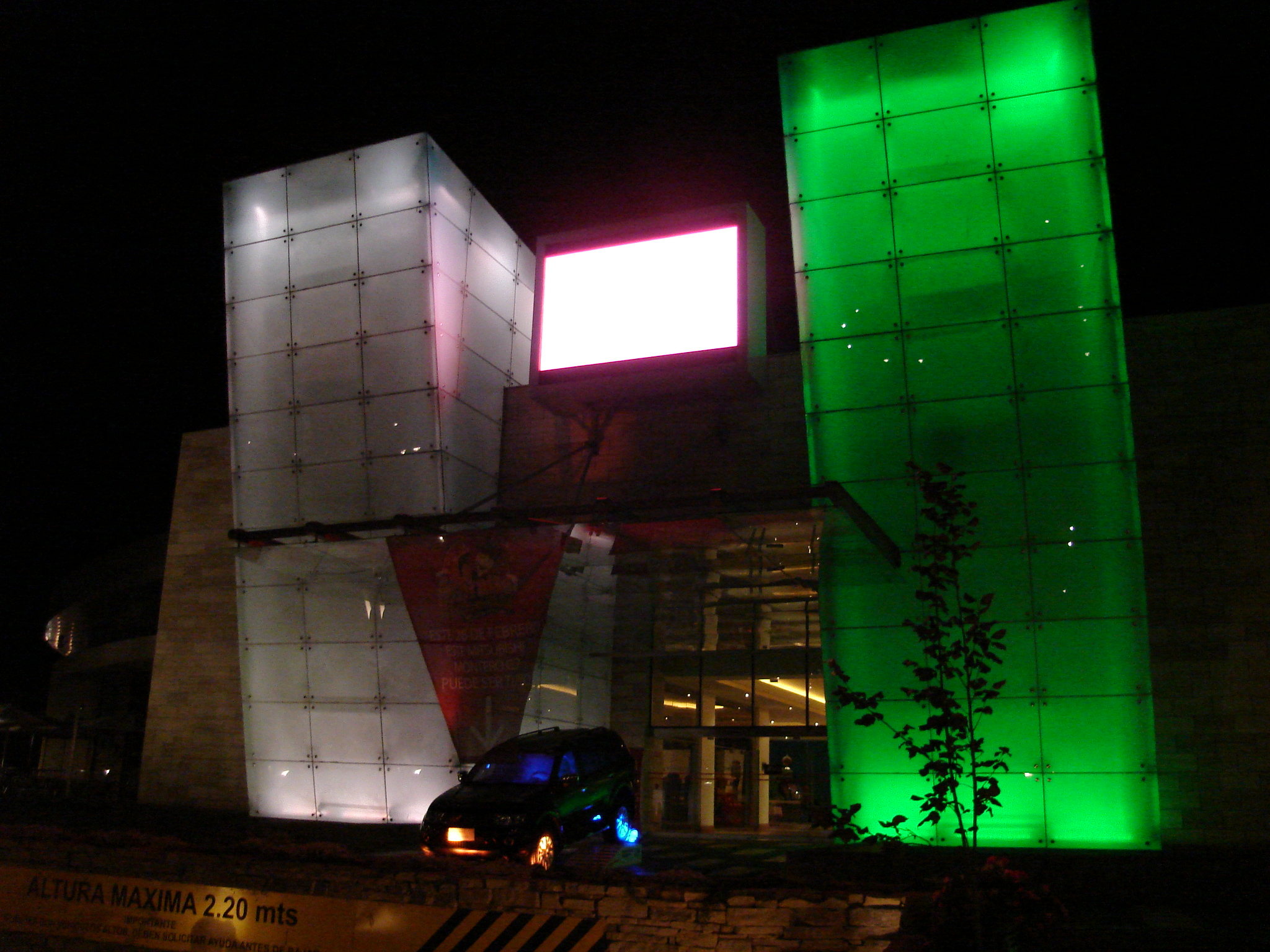
- Interactive map of Sun Monticello
- Location: Mostazal, Chile; Autopista del Maipo km 57
- Opened: October 8, 2008
- No. of rooms: 155
- Signature attractions: Suka Club
- Notable restaurants: El Capataz
- Casino type: Land
- Owner: Sun International
- Previous names: Monticello Grand Casino y Mundo de Entretención (2008-2014); Paihuén Casino & Resort (2005-2008)
- Website: http://www.sunmonticello.cl/

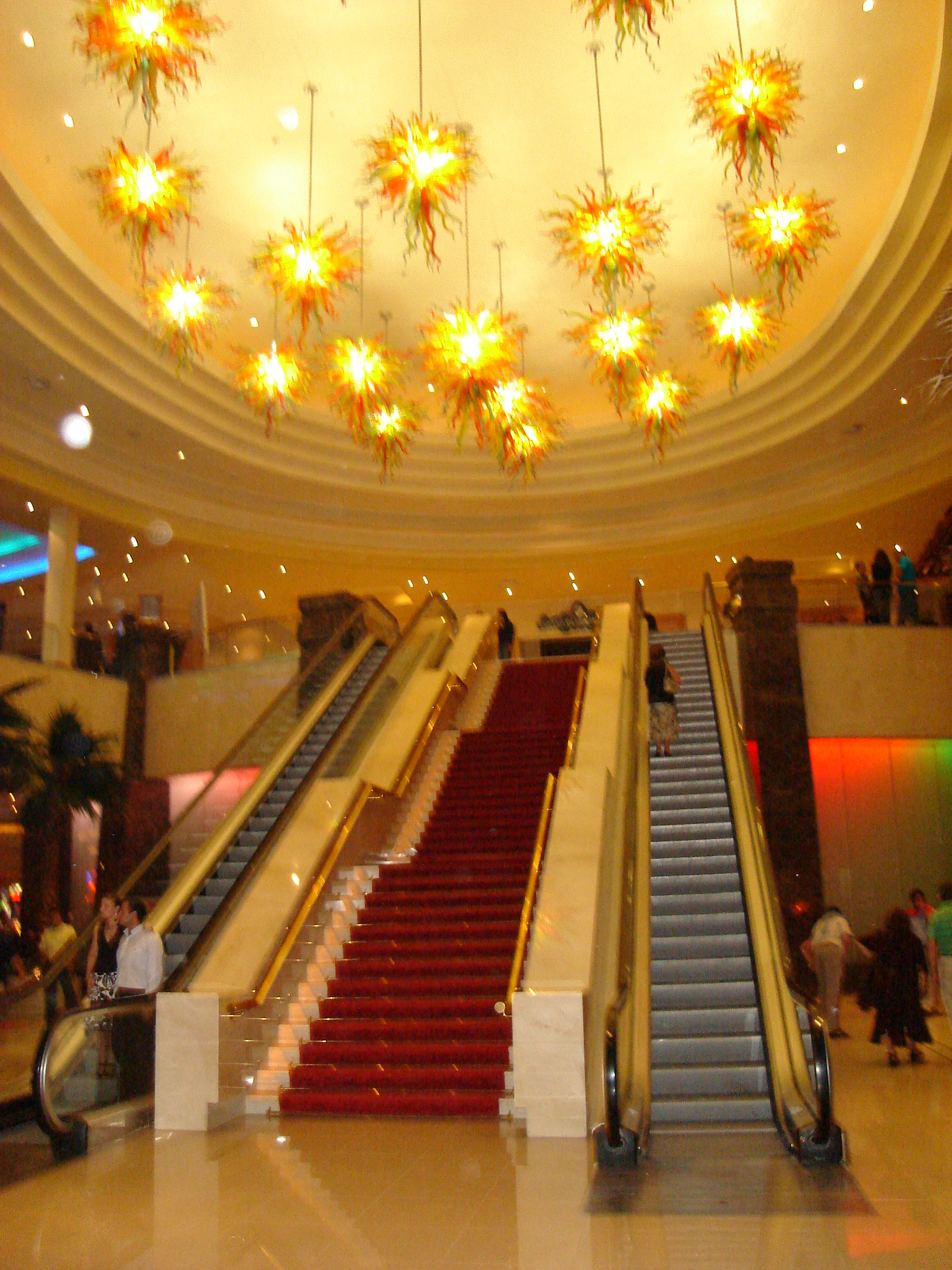
Hall of the casino.

Sun Monticello, formerly Monticello Grand Casino, is a casino and hotel, situated in Mostazal, Chile.

== History ==
The complex was developed by a joint venture between International Group of Gaming Resorts (IGGR) and Sun International, and opened in October 2008. The official inauguration and opening of the hotel was held on 17 December 2009 with a performance by Marc Anthony and Jennifer Lopez.

The casino was severely damaged by the 2010 Chile earthquake, and was closed for five months due to reparations valued in USD 10 million. As a result, it remained closed until July 30 of that year. After its reopening, it received 25,000 visitors in five days.

== Revenues ==
It is the casino with the main revenues in Chile from 2009.

Year	Revenues (USD)	% Revenues (of all Chilean casinos)
2009	77.600.000	35,30%
2010	77 880 000	▼24,54%
2011	▲146 790 000	▲28,50%
2012	▲164 000 000	27,60%
2013	▼130 700 000	27,30%
2014	129 500 000	28,80%
2015	▲146 790 000	▲22,50%
