= Golden Mile, Durban =

Stretch of beachfront in South Africa

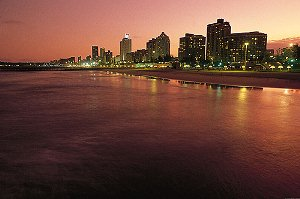
View of the Golden Mile at sunset

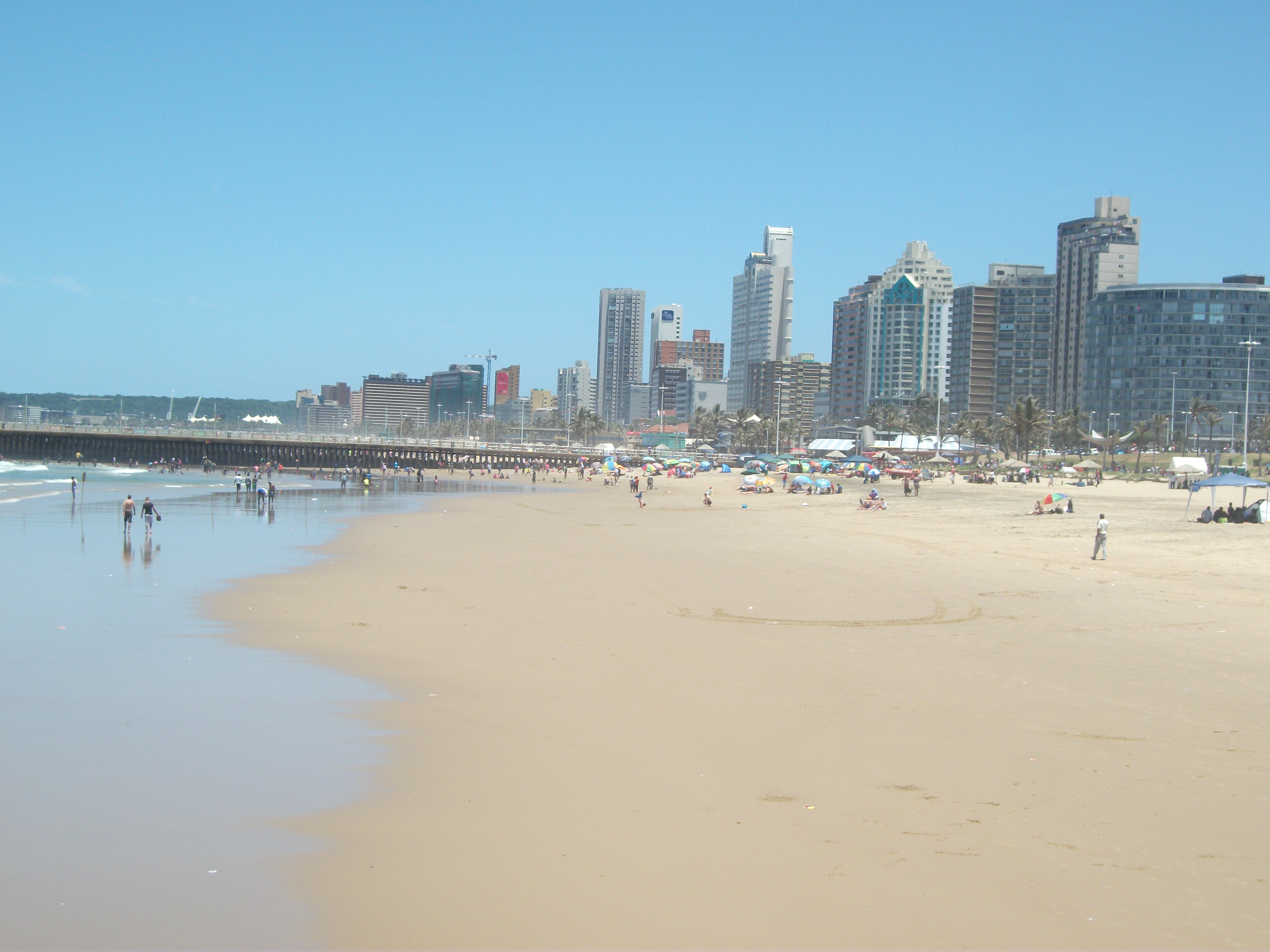
View of Golden Mile from North Beach

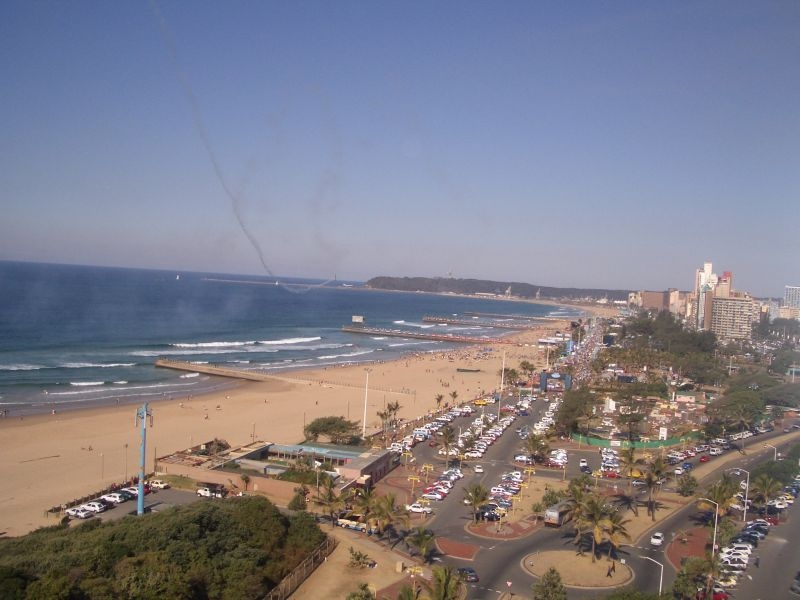
View of the Golden Mile, from the Snake Park to Harbour Mouth

The Golden Mile (or, colloquially, "The Mile") is the popular stretch of beachfront in the city of Durban, KwaZulu-Natal, South Africa, including the promenade that runs along with it. It runs roughly from uShaka Beach (where the uShaka Marine World is located) in Point Waterfront to Suncoast Casino and Entertainment World in the north and now includes a route directly to Moses Mabhida Stadium. It abuts the central business district of the city to its west.

It is one of the main tourist attractions in the Durban area. The wide stretch of golden sands, artificially separated by various piers, provides opportunities for sun-worshippers and swimmers to enjoy the sub-tropical sunshine and warm waters of the Indian Ocean. Common activities include swimming, surfing and fishing. Most of the Mile's beaches are protected year-round by lifeguards and shark nets. The Mile is also a well-known surfer's haven. The South Beach end, in particular, is well known as a safe beach for neophyte surfers. The beachfront properties are a mix of residential apartments and tourist hotels, development of which boomed in the 1970s, although remnants of Durban's art-deco architecture are still evident. Interspersed among the beachfront properties are several popular restaurants and nightclubs.

The Golden Mile has long been a popular domestic holiday destination and during the holiday seasons (June–July and December–January) South Africans from across the country, but in particular the Gauteng region, flock to enjoy its attractions and those of the longer beachfront area, which include:

- Blue Lagoon, a popular hangout, picnic and fishing spot
- Mini Town with a miniature replica of Durban, complete with a working miniature railway and airport.
- Moses Mabhida Stadium
- Traditional market vendors and other hawkers with a selection of Zulu art and crafts.
- An oceanway pavement along the beaches to encourage more people to enjoy walking and cycling.
- Suncoast Casino and Entertainment World, a casino complex with a semi-private beach, restaurants, shops and public entertainment facilities.
- uShaka Marine World aquarium, water park, dolphinarium, containing a restaurant with the largest shark tank in the world.
- North Beach, Dairy Beach, the Bay of Plenty, Snake Park, Pirates and Country Club beaches are popular surfing beaches separated by the piers.
- The Skate Park in front of the Bay of Plenty caters for skateboarders, roller bladers and BMX'ers.
- The Surfing Museum, a historical site cataloguing some of Durban's surfing history.

The street that runs alongside the Golden Mile is divided between Snell Parade in the north, O.R. Tambo Parade (formerly named, and still widely referred to, as Marine Parade) and Erskine Terrace in the south.

== See also ==
- List of restaurant districts and streets
