= Southern Sun Hotels =

South African multinational hospitality company

Southern Sun Limited
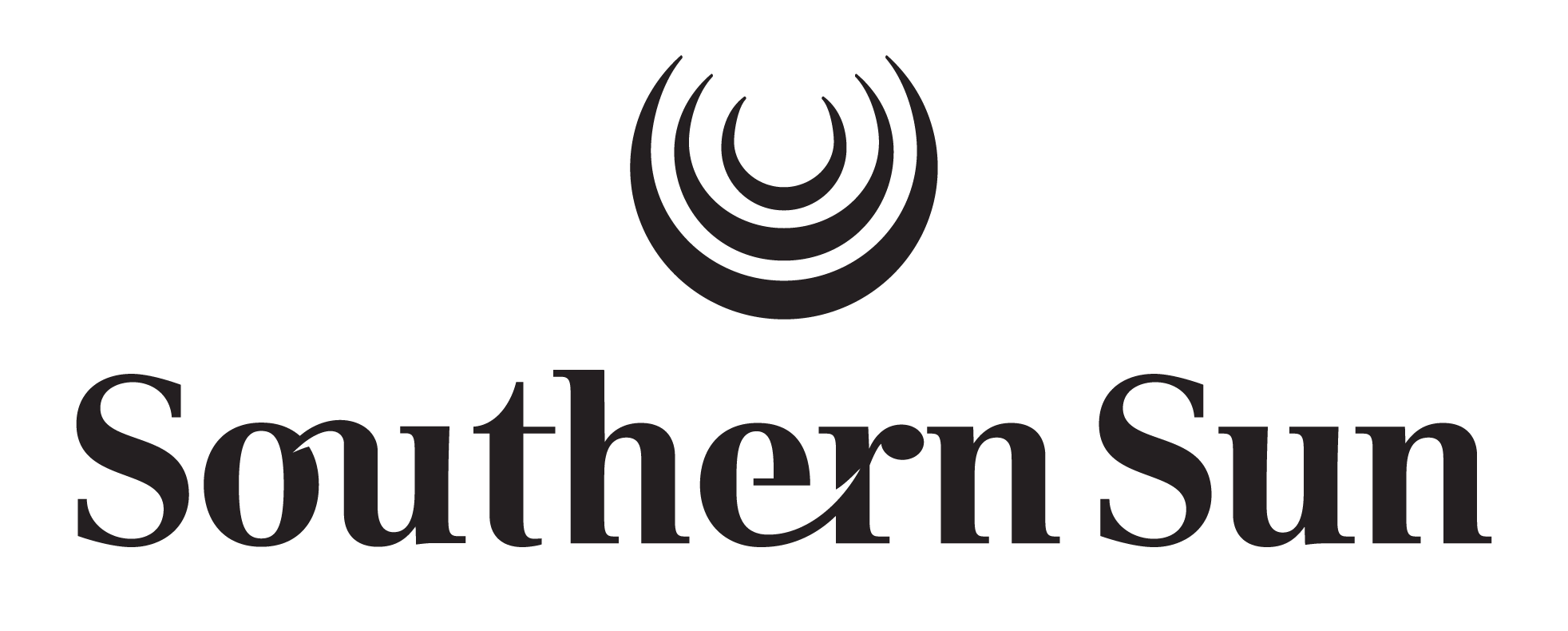

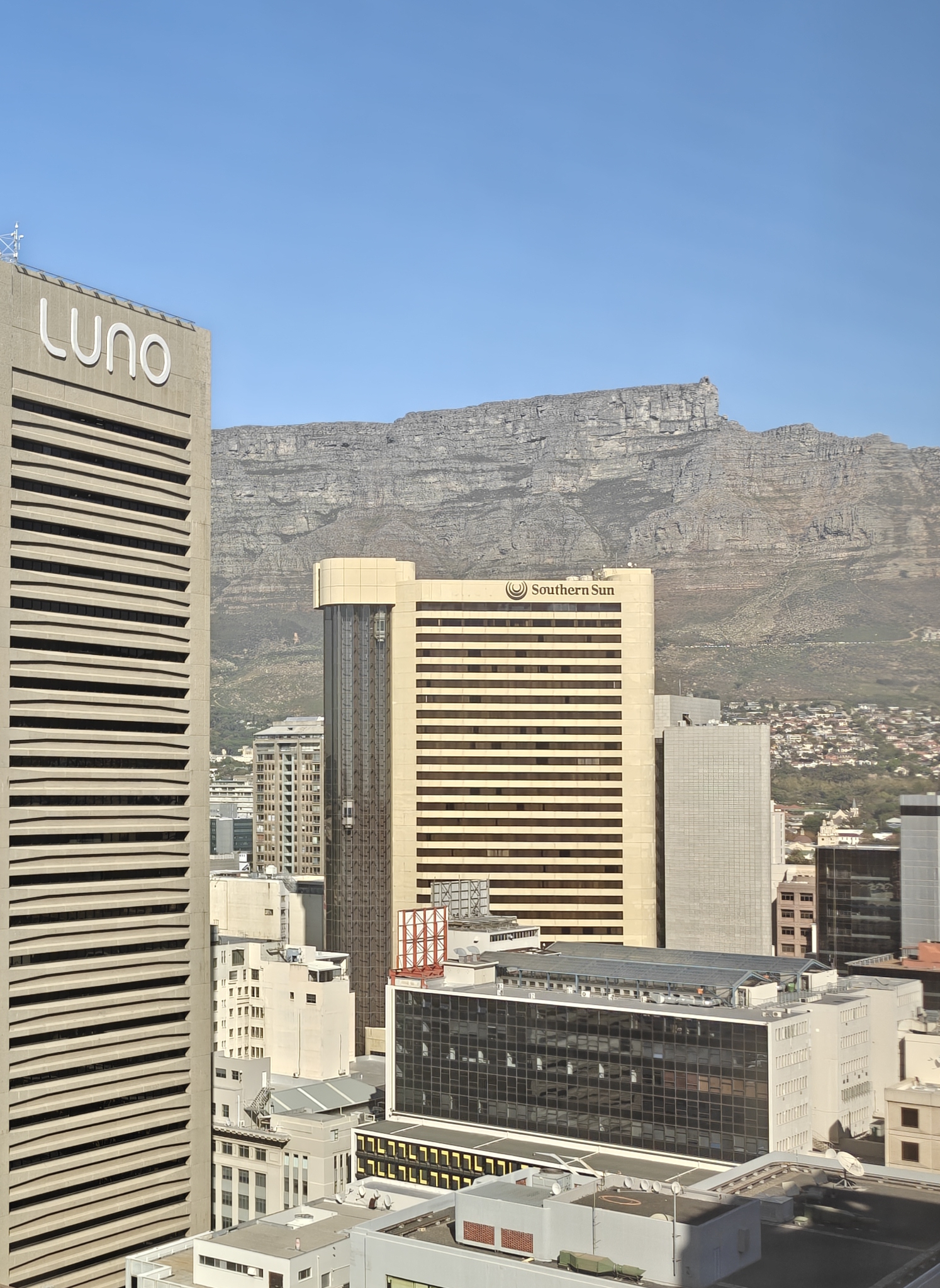
- The Southern Sun Cape Sun hotel in Strand Street, Cape Town CBD
- Type: Hotel chain
- Traded as: JSE: SSU
- ISIN: ZAE000272522
- Industry: Hospitality
- Founded: 1969; 57 years ago
- Founder: Sol Kerzner
- Headquarters: Sandton, South Africa
- Area served: South Africa; Zambia; Seychelles; Tanzania; Mozambique; United Arab Emirates
- Key people: Marcel von Aulock (CEO)
- Parent: Hosken Consolidated Investments (41.5%)
- Website: southernsun.com

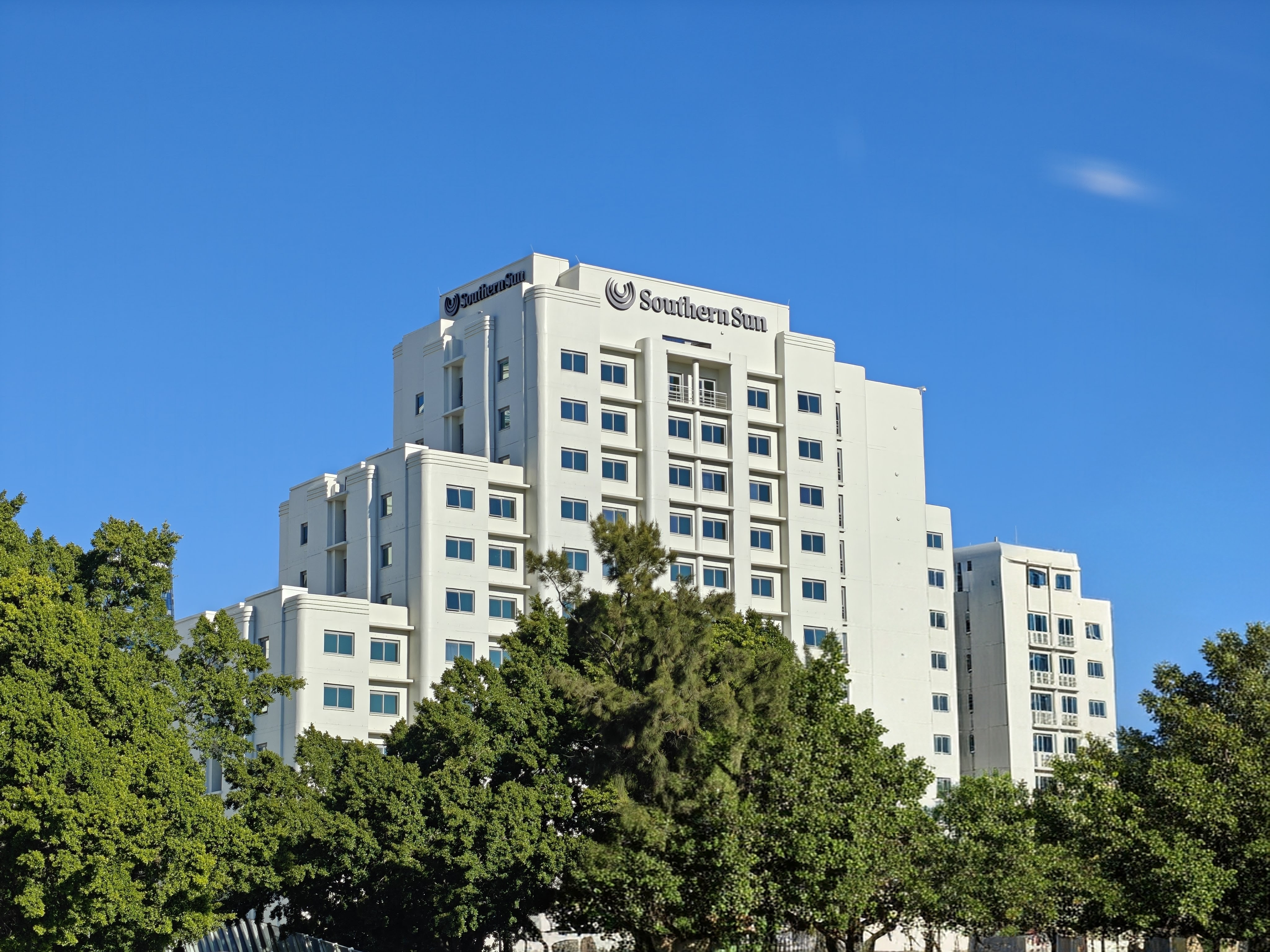
The Southern Sun Waterfront Hotel in Cape Town CBD

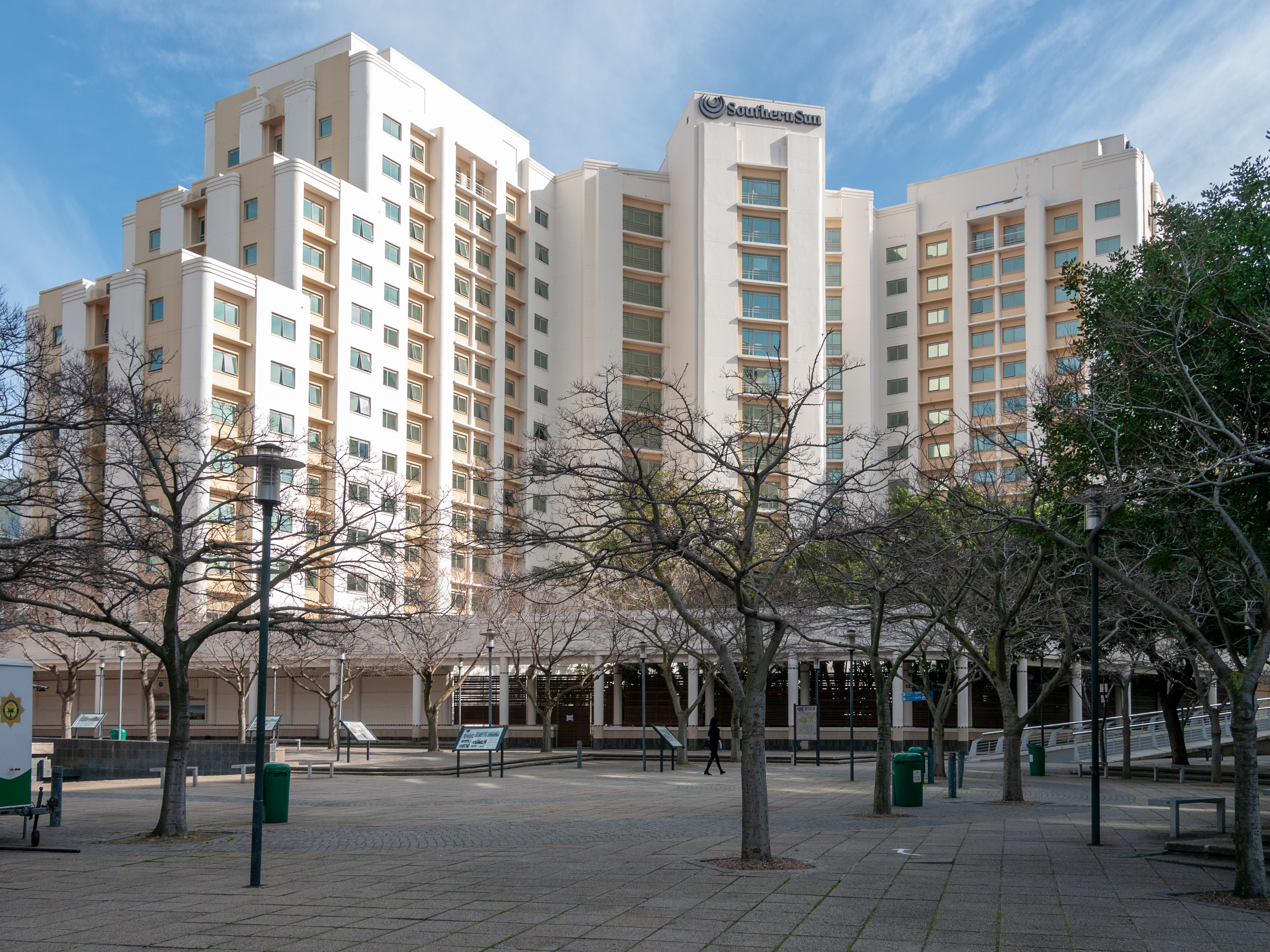
Southern Sun Waterfront hotel

Southern Sun (officially Southern Sun Limited) is a South African multinational hospitality company headquartered in Sandton, South Africa, and listed on the Johannesburg Stock Exchange (JSE). The company is partially owned by Cape Town-based investment holding company Hosken Consolidated Investments.

The group was founded in 1969 by hotelier Sol Kerzner, and South African Breweries. Between 2012 and April 2022 the group was known as Tsogo Sun. Southern Sun owns and operates over 90 hotels in South Africa, Zambia, Mozambique, Seychelles, and the Middle East.

In addition to hotels, the group operates conferencing venues, including Sandton Convention Centre in Sandton, food and beverage outlets, and spas.

== History ==
Southern Sun Hotels was formed in 1969 through a partnership between hotel magnate Sol Kerzner and South African Breweries Limited. At the time, Southern Sun Hotels was the largest hotel group in the Southern Hemisphere. The group started with six hotels including the Beverly Hills hotel in uMhlanga, near Durban.

In 1983 the group split, with the casino operations becoming Sun International, and the hotels remaining as Southern Sun. In 1985 the group acquired the Holiday Inn South Africa hotel group. This expanded operations from 27 to 50 hotels throughout the country.

In 1991 Southern Sun delisted from the JSE to become a wholly owned subsidiary of South African Breweries. In the same year Southern Sun entered into a joint venture with Accor SA to develop the Formula 1 and Formula Inn hotel brands in South Africa.

In 1995 Tsogo Sun Holdings was constituted as a bidding consortium between Southern Sun and numerous black empowerment partners to form Tsogo Sun Gaming. In the same year the group entered into an agreement with InterContinental Hotels & Resorts to operate three hotels in South Africa. In 1999 Southern Sun acquired a 50% interest in a consortium with Liberty Group Limited (‘Liberty’) called The Cullinan Hotel Proprietary Limited (‘Cullinan’) which owned three hotels.

In 2000 the group opened the Sandton Convention Centre, one of the largest privately opened convention centres of its kind. In 2002 the group restructured resulting in Tsogo Sun having 51% black ownership from various empowerment consortiums with the balance of the shares owned by SABMiller. Subsequent to this, Hosken Consolidated Investments (HCI) became the largest shareholder of the group. In 2005 the group rebranded several hotels to Southern Sun Hotels, Garden Court and StayEasy. The group also opened the first SunSquare branded property in the same year.

Between 2009 and 2011 the group acquired Blackrock Casino and the Caledon Casino, Hotel and Spa. A merger with Gold Reef Resorts Limited incorporated an additional seven casinos in the groups portfolio. In 2012 the group undertook a reverse listing on JSE to consolidate the casino businesses and Southern Sun Hotels under one brand, Tsogo Sun.

In 2013 the group acquired Accor SA's holding in Formula 1 hotels and rebranded them () to SUN1. The group also completed the consolidation of the 734 room Southern Sun Elangeni & Maharani hotel and invested $70 million into the Southern Sun Ikoyi hotel in Lagos, Nigeria.

In 2014, after 45 years, SABMiller disposed of its stake in the group and the investment was placed in the local and international market.

In 2015 construction began on the 500 room SunSquare and StayEasy hotel complex in the Cape Town City Bowl. In 2016 the group began managing Crowne Plaza Rosebank and Holiday Inn Sandton. In June 2019 the business unbundled into separate hotel and gaming interests.

In February 2022 Hospitality Property Fund delisted from the JSE and became a wholly owned subsidiary of Southern Sun (previously known as Tsogo Sun Hotels).

In May 2022 Tsogo Sun Hotels rebranded back to Southern Sun and in August of the same year the JSE listing changed to SSU completing the rebranding process.

== Brands ==
Southern Sun operates six hotel brands and eight individually-branded luxury properties.

- Individually Branded Luxury Properties: 54 on Bath, Arabella Hotel, Golf & Spa, Beverly Hills, InterContinental Johannesburg O.R. Tambo Airport, Sandton Sun, Sandton Towers, Mount Grace Hotel & Spa, and Paradise Sun.
- Southern Sun Hotels are a full service group of properties. These properties are 4-star graded properties.
- Southern Sun Resorts are a collection of holiday resorts in locations near the Kruger National Park, uMhlanga Rocks, the central Drakensberg and Plettenberg Bay. These resorts include timeshare accommodation.
- SunSquare are full service properties in urban locations.
- Garden Court is a mid-tier brand widely located in South Africa and in one location in Kitwe, Zambia.
- StayEasy are a budget brand with a focus on business travel.
- SUN1 are focused at budget travellers with rooms designed for three sharing.

== Notable Properties ==
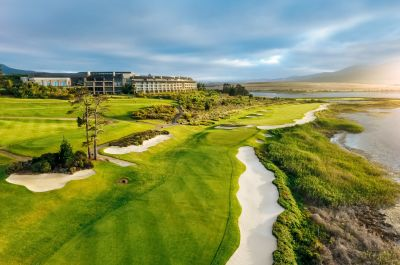
Arabella Hotel, Golf & Spa in Kleinmond, Western Cape, South Africa

Beverly Hills - South Africa's first five star property is located at 1 Lighthouse Road in uMhlanga, KwaZulu-Natal. In 2014 the hotel commemorated being in operation for 50 years.

Arabella Hotel, Golf & Spa - The property was added to the Southern Sun group in April 2020. The property is located in the Kogelberg Biosphere, a UNESCO World Heritage Site.

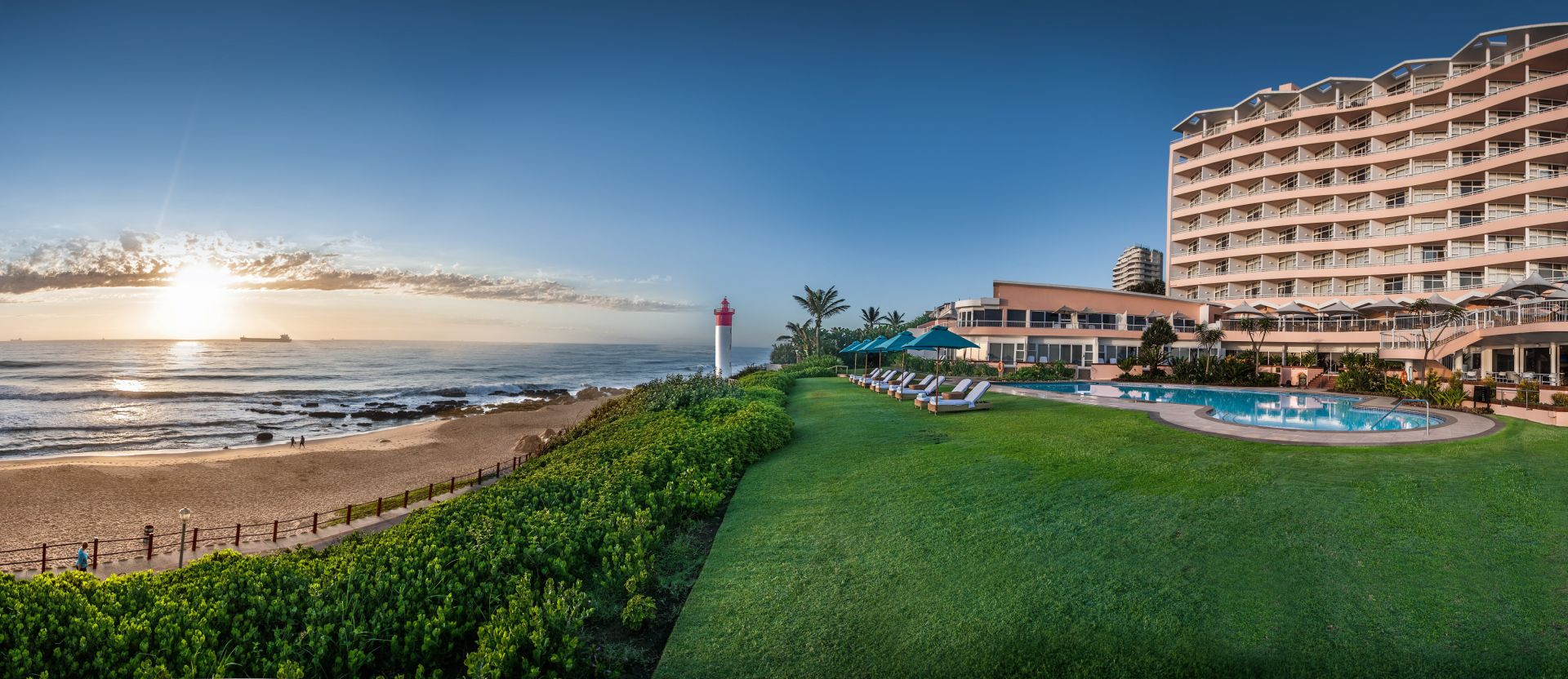
Beverly Hills hotel in uMhlanga, KwaZulu-Natal, South Africa

Sandton Sun & Towers - In 2022 Southern Sun rebranded the InterContinental Sandton Towers Hotel to Sandton Towers.

Beacon Island – Located in Plettenberg Bay, this resort is one of South Africa's longest running hotels. The property is notable for its architecture inspired by Frank Lloyd Wright's Guggenheim museum design.
