= Tsogo Sun =

Entertainment company headquartered in South Africa

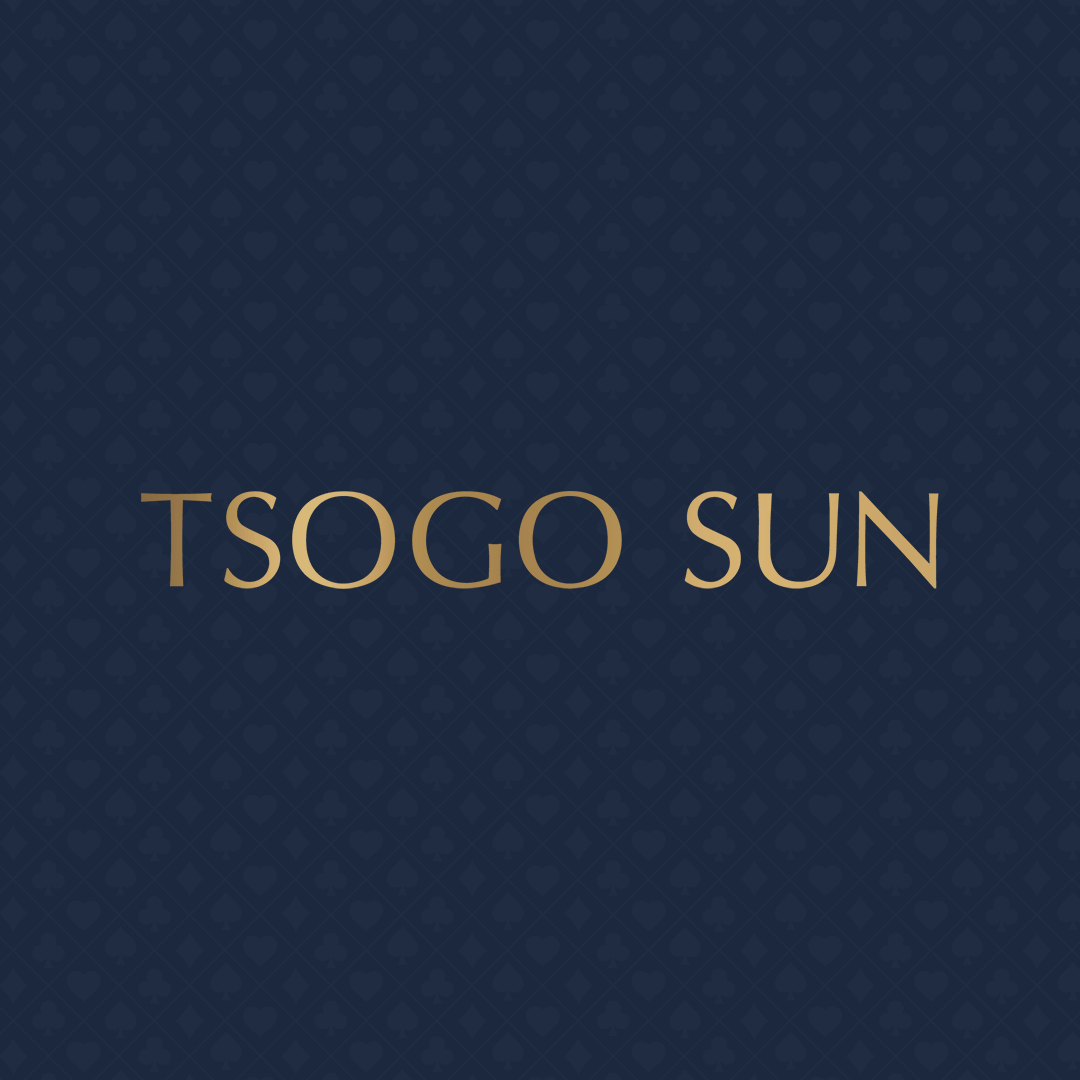
- Traded as: JSE: TSG
- ISIN: ZAE000273116
- Industry: Hospitality; Entertainment; Tourism; Gambling
- Founded: 1995; 31 years ago
- Headquarters: Johannesburg, South Africa
- Number of locations: 55
- Area served: South Africa
- Key people: Chris Du Toit (CEO)
- Brands: Montecasino; Gold Reef City playTSOGO bet.co.za VSlots
- Owner: Hosken Consolidated Investments (50%)
- Website: tsogosun.com

Tsogo Sun is a South African hotel, gambling, and entertainment group, half owned by Cape Town-based investment holding company Hosken Consolidated Investments.

Tsogo Sun operates 15 casinos, 24 Galaxy Bingo sites, 1 Independent Site Operator Licence (ISO), VSlots Limited Pay-out Machines (LPMs) across 9 South African provinces, Bet.co.za bookmaker licenses, hotels, a theme park, theaters, movie cinemas, restaurants, bars, and conference facilities.

Tsogo Sun means 'resurrection' or 'new life' – a term that mimics the daily rising of the sun in Setswana.

== Ownership ==
Prior to 2011, Tsogo Sun Holdings owned and operated two divisions: Southern Sun Hotel Interests and Tsogo Sun. On 24 February 2011, Tsogo Sun Holdings concluded a merger with and reverse listing through Gold Reef Resorts.

The group was one of the largest Johannesburg Stock Exchange listed companies in the hotel and tourism sector with a market capitalisation of R30.8 billion. Since the unbundling of its business into separate hotels and gaming interests in June 2019, Southern Sun and Tsogo Sun have been listed separately on the JSE. Tsogo Sun (TSG) and Tsogo Sun Hotels (TGO trading as Southern Sun) are both owned by Hosken Consolidated Investments (47%) and public shares.

== History ==
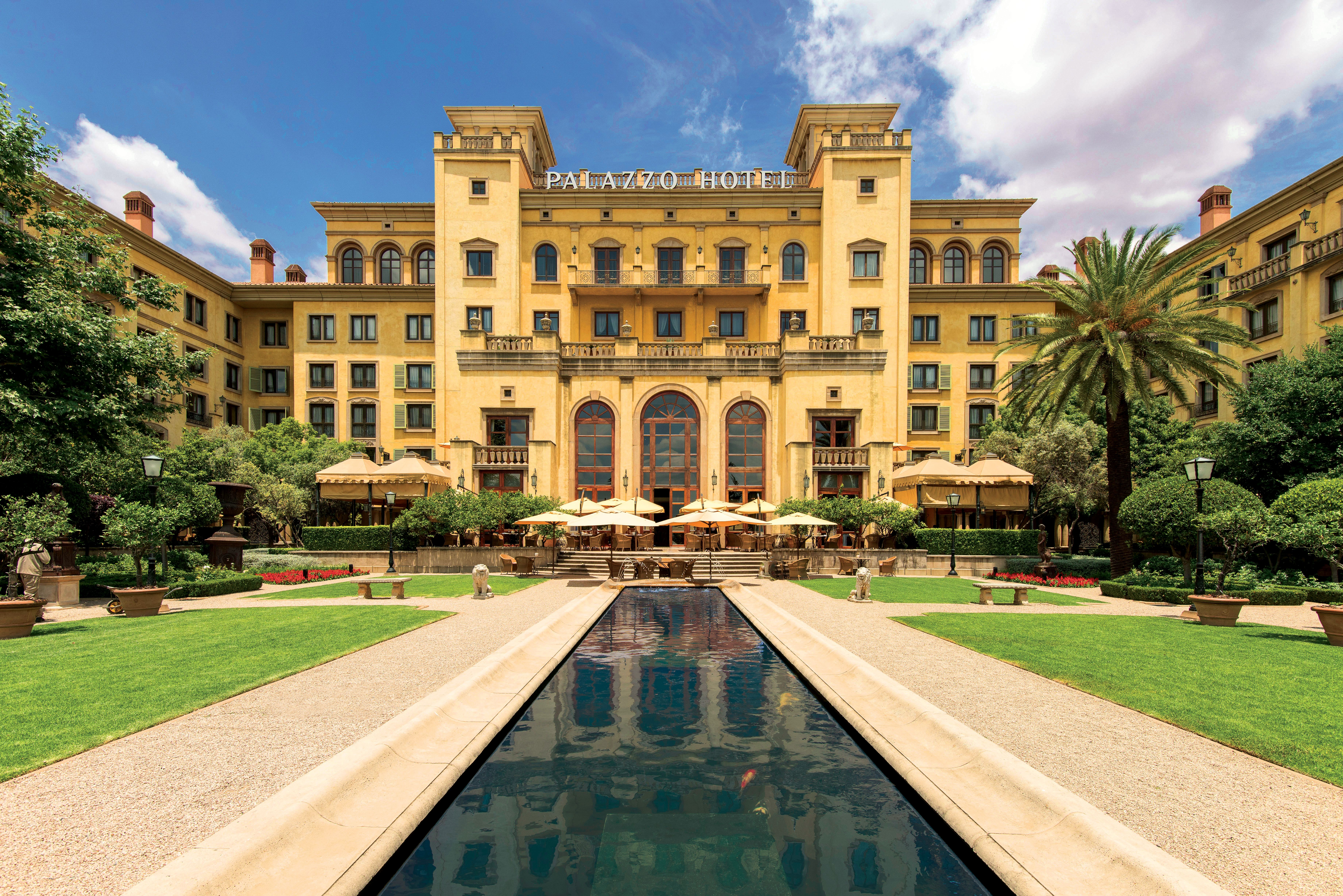
Palazzo Hotel Montecasino, Fourways Johannesburg

The group was established in 1969, when hotelier Sol Kerzner founded the chain of Southern Sun Hotels in partnership with South African Breweries.

Prior to 1994, the group's gambling operations were limited to those hotels located in Apartheid-era bantustans, as gambling in the rest of South Africa was heavily restricted. When the new democratic government came to power, gambling was legalised, which enabled the group to add 14 gaming destinations to its portfolio.

Through a process of bid applications, the group acquired five casino licences: Emnotweni (Nelspruit), The Ridge, Hemingways, Montecasino and Suncoast.

Two additional casinos, The Caledon and Blackrock (formerly known as Century Casino), were added to the group's portfolio in 2009 by acquiring Century Resorts Limited and Winlen Casino Operators (Pty) Limited. Subsequently, a further seven casinos were added to the portfolio through the reverse buy-out of Gold Reef Resorts in 2011: Gold Reef City, Silverstar, Queens, Mykonos, Goldfields, Golden Horse and Garden Route.

In May 2014, the group announced that it had entered into transaction agreements resulting in Tsogo Sun acquiring a 40% equity interest each in SunWest International and Worcester Casinos. This transaction gave the group a stake in all five casinos located in the Western Cape. However the deal failed and subsequently in 2016 an agreement was reached that gave Tsogo Sun a 20% stake in SunWest International and the Worcester Casino.

As of 1 June 2017 the Tsogo Sun CEO was Jacques Booysen. Jacques Booysen previously served as managing director of Gaming at Tsogo Sun Holdings since April 2007.

The group notified shareholders on 15 March 2019 of a proposed restructuring that would result in a separation of hotel and gaming interests and separate JSE listing of Tsogo Sun Hotels and Tsogo Sun Gaming.

As of 12 June 2019 Tsogo Sun was split into Tsogo Sun and Tsogo Sun Hotels. Tsogo Sun Hotels (now Southern Sun) includes individually branded hotels such as the luxury Beverly Hills and Palazzo as well as hotel brands that include Southern Sun Hotels, Garden Court, SunSquare and Hi Hotels.

Tsogo Sun Gaming includes casinos precincts such as Montecasino and Gold Reef City as well as ownership of Galaxy Bingo that operates 23 bingo venues across South Africa and V Slots a leading supplier of Limited Pay Out slot machines. In 2020 Tsogo Sun Gaming acquired a majority ownership of South African sports betting website Bet.co.za.

== Properties ==
=== Blackrock Casino ===
Blackrock Casino
- Owner: Tsogo Sun
- Website: www.blackrockcasino.co.za

Blackrock Casino is a hotel and casino located in New Castle in KwaZulu-Natal, South Africa.

=== Emerald Resort & Casino ===
Emerald Resort & Casino
- Interactive map of Emerald Resort & Casino
- Location: Vanderbijlpark, Emfuleni, South Africa; 777 Frikkie Meyer Blvd, Vanderbijlpark, 1900, South Africa; 26.74274°S 27.85771°E
- Opened: 1997; 29 years ago
- Owner: Tsogo Sun (55%)
- Website: www.emeraldcasino.co.za

Emerald Resort & Casino is a hotel and casino located at a private estate on the banks of the Vaal River in Vanderbijlpark, South Africa. The casino opened in 1997.

=== Emnotweni ===
Emnotweni Casino
- Opened: 2024; 2 years ago
- Owner: Tsogo Sun
- Website: www.emnotweni.co.za

=== Garden Route Casino ===
Garden Route Casino
- Opened: 2024; 2 years ago
- Owner: Tsogo Sun
- Website: www.gardenroutecasino.co.za

=== Gold Reef City Casino & Theme Park ===
Main Article: Gold Reef City

Gold Reef City Casino & Theme Park
- Opened: 1987; 39 years ago
- Owner: Tsogo Sun
- Website: www.goldreefcity.co.za

Montecasino
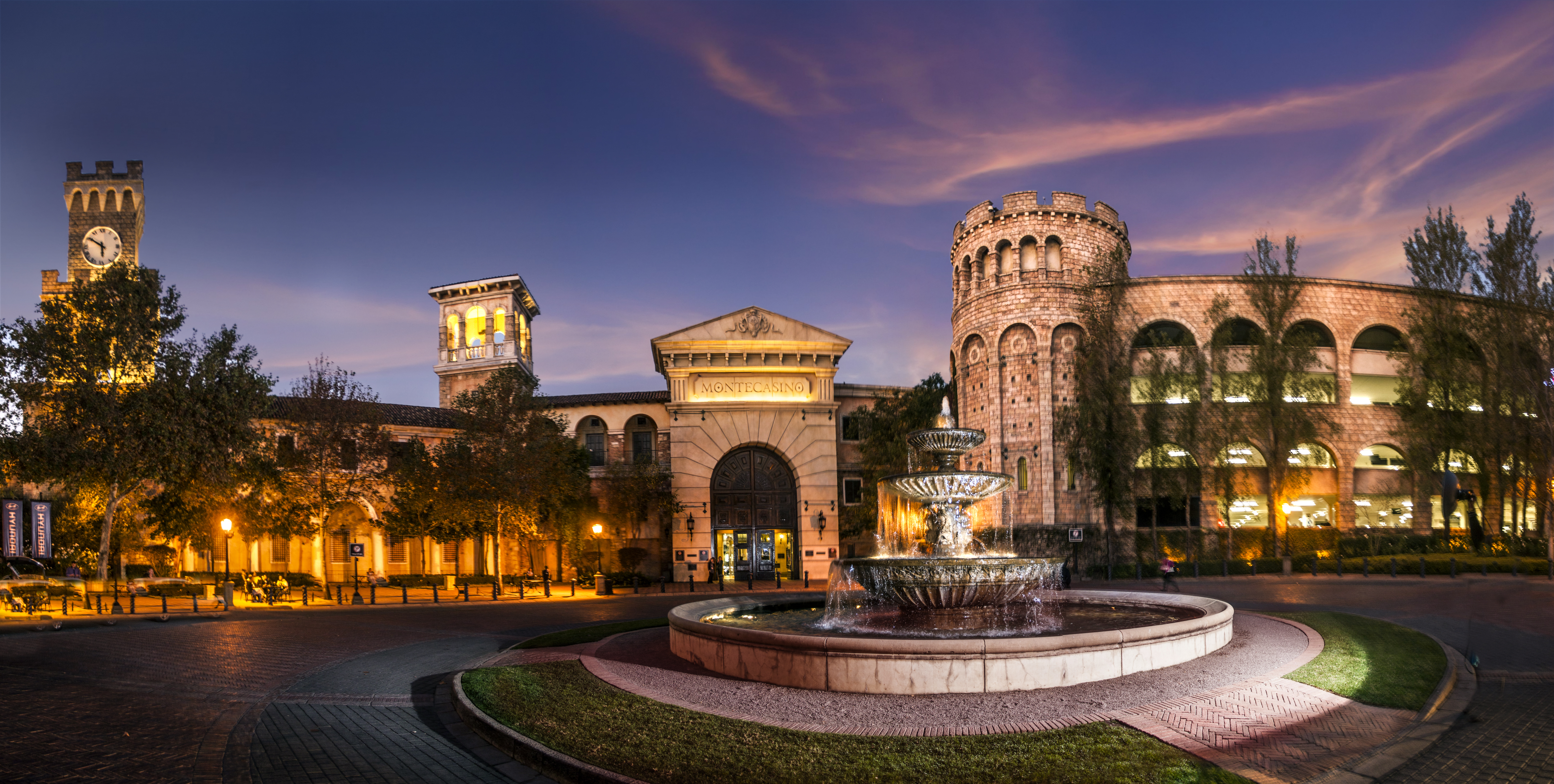
- The Main Entrance of Montecasino in 2016
- Location: Fourways, Sandton; 1 Montecasino Blvd, Fourways, Sandton, 2021
- Opened: 2000; 26 years ago
- Theme: Italian Village
- Owner: Tsogo Sun
- Website: www.montecasino.co.za

Mykonos Casino
- Opened: 2024; 2 years ago
- Owner: Tsogo Sun
- Website: www.mykonoscasino.co.za

=== Silverstar Casino ===
Silverstar Casino & Hotel is located in Muldersdrift, Mogale City in Johannesburg, Gauteng, South Africa. The casino first opened its doors in 2007.

Silverstar Casino
- Opened: 2024; 2 years ago
- Owner: Tsogo Sun
- Website: www.silverstar.co.za

=== Suncoast Casino, Hotels & Entertainment ===
Tsogo Sun
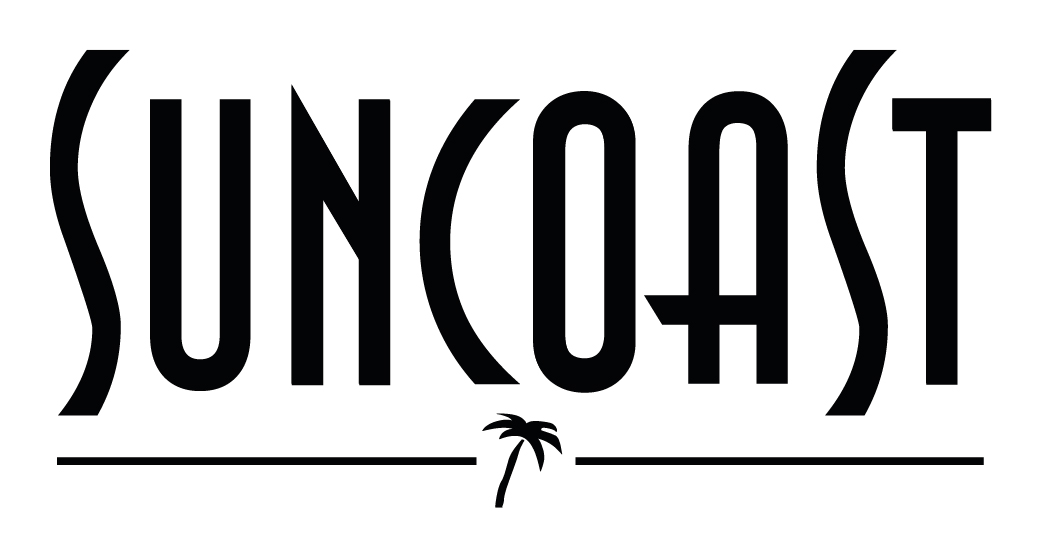

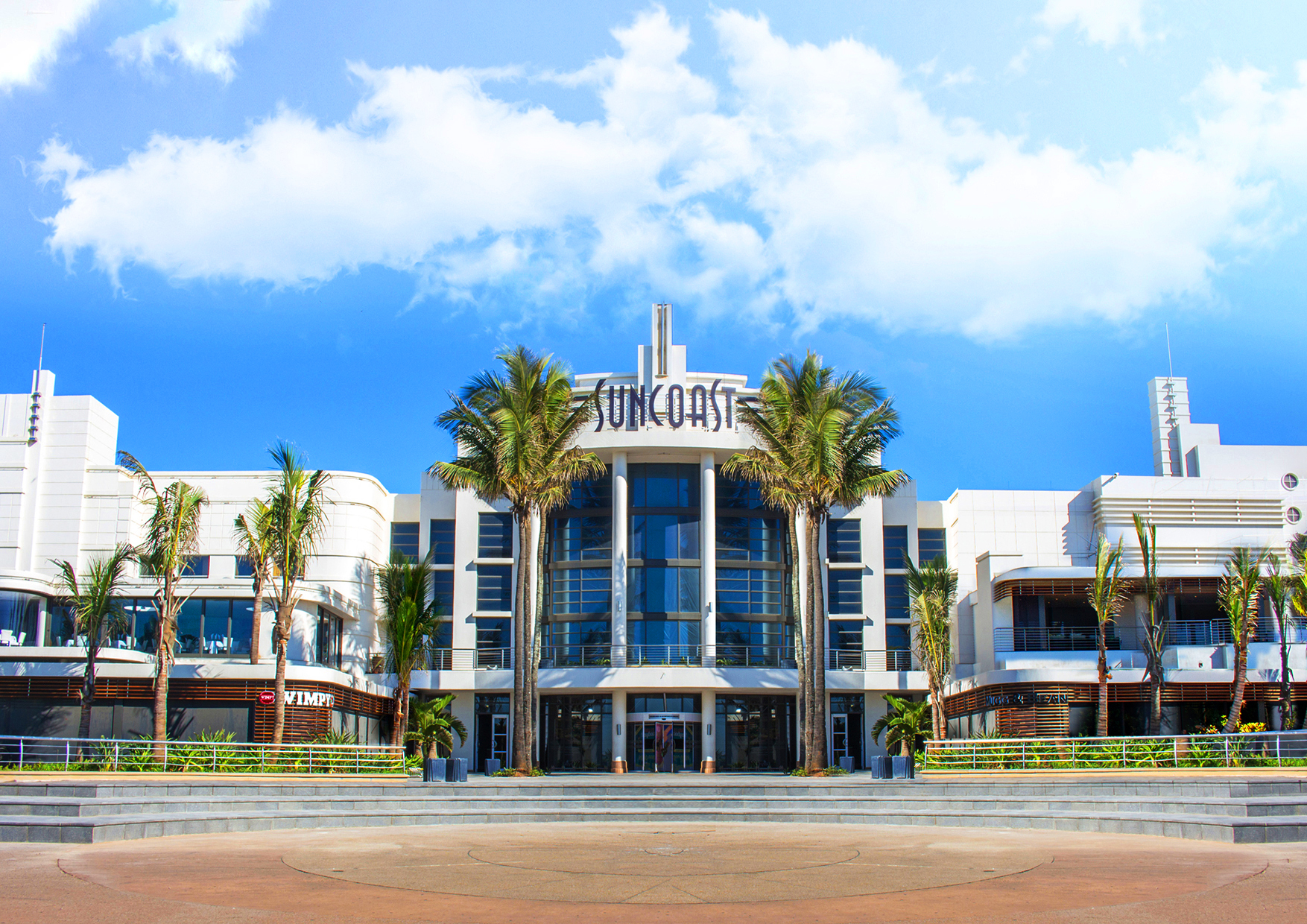
- Location: Durban, South Africa
- Opened: November 2002
- No. of rooms: 164
- Casino type: Land-based
- Owner: Tsogo Sun
- Website: tsogosun.com/suncoast-casino

The Ridge Casino
- Opened: 2024; 2 years ago
- Owner: Tsogo Sun
- Website: www.theridge.co.za

== See also ==
- List of casinos in South Africa
