= 2010 World Series of Poker results =

Below are the results for the 2010 World Series of Poker.

== Key ==
*	Elected to the Poker Hall of Fame
(#/#)	This denotes a bracelet winner. The first number is the number of bracelets won in the 2010 WSOP. The second number is the total number of bracelets won. Both numbers represent totals as of that point during the tournament.
Place	What place each player at the final table finished
Name	The player who made it to the final table
Prize (US$)	The amount of money awarded for each finish at the event's final table

== Results ==
=== Event 1: $500 Casino Employees No Limit Hold'em ===
- 2-Day Event: Friday, May 28, 2010 to Saturday, May 29, 2010
- Number of Entries: 721
- Total Prize Pool: $324,450
- Number of Payouts: 72
- Winning Hand: A♣ A♦

Final Table
Place	Name	Prize
1st	Hoai Pham (1/1)	$71,424
2nd	Arthur Vea	$44,079
3rd	Christopher Reider	$28,655
4th	Matthew Hollinger	$21,047
5th	Patrick Silvey	$15,677
6th	Kent Washington	$11,829
7th	David Villegas	$9,029
8th	Jeffrey Bennett	$6,969
9th	Yuta Motoyama	$5,434

=== Event 2: $50,000 The Poker Player's Championship ===
- 5-Day Event: Friday, May 28, 2010 to Tuesday, June 1, 2010
- Number of Entries: 116
- Total Prize Pool: $5,568,000
- Number of Payouts: 16
- Winning Hand: Q♠ 5♣

Final Table^{[a]}
Place	Name	Prize
1st	Michael Mizrachi (1/1)	$1,559,046
2nd	Vladimir Shchemelev	$963,375
3rd	David Oppenheim	$603,348
4th	John Juanda (0/4)	$436,865
5th	Robert Mizrachi (0/1)	$341,429
6th	David Baker	$272,275
7th	Daniel Alaei (0/2)	$221,105
8th	Mikael Thuritz	$182,463

=== Event 3: $1,000 No Limit Hold'em ===
- 4-Day Event: Saturday, May 29, 2010 to Tuesday, June 1, 2010
- Number of Entries: 4,345
- Total Prize Pool: $3,910,500
- Number of Payouts: 441
- Winning Hand: Q♦ Q♠

Final Table
Place	Name	Prize
1st	Aadam Daya (1/1)	$625,872
2nd	Deepak Bhatti	$385,106
3rd	Gabe Costner	$279,327
4th	Bart Davis	$206,904
5th	Nicholas Mitchell	$154,425
6th	Cory Brown	$116,141
7th	Isaac Settle	$88,025
8th	Dash Dudley	$67,221
9th	Richard Rice	$51,735

=== Event 4: $1,500 Omaha Hi-Low Split-8 or Better ===
- 3-Day Event: Sunday, May 30, 2010 to Tuesday, June 1, 2010
- Number of Entries: 818
- Total Prize Pool: $1,104,300
- Number of Payouts: 81
- Winning Hand: Q♥ 9♠ 3♥ 2♠

Final Table
Place	Name	Prize
1st	Michael Chow (1/1)	$237,140
2nd	Dan Heimiller (0/1)	$146,505
3rd	Ylon Schwartz	$94,561
4th	Fred Koubi	$69,272
5th	Scott Epstein	$51,493
6th	Michael Cipolla	$38,794
7th	Sasha Rosewood	$29,584
8th	Joe Leibman	$22,825
9th	Todd Barlow	$17,801

=== Event 5: $1,500 No Limit Hold'em ===
- 3-Day Event: Monday, May 31, 2010 to Wednesday, June 2, 2010
- Number of Entries: 2,092
- Total Prize Pool: $2,824,200
- Number of Payouts: 216
- Winning Hand: A♠ J♠

Final Table
Place	Name	Prize
1st	Praz Bansi (1/2)	$515,501
2nd	Vincent Jacques	$320,913
3rd	Calvin Kordus	$223,069
4th	David Tuthill	$160,654
5th	Tomer Berda	$117,416
6th	Donald Offord	$86,858
7th	Hugh Bell	$65,097
8th	David Sands	$49,409
9th	Kyle Knecht	$37,943

=== Event 6: $5,000 No Limit Hold'em Shootout ===
- 3-Day Event: Tuesday, June 1, 2010 to Thursday, June 3, 2010
- Number of Entries: 358
- Total Prize Pool: $1,682,600
- Number of Payouts: 36
- Winning Hand: A♥ J♣

Final Table
Place	Name	Prize
1st	Joshua Tieman (1/1)	$441,692
2nd	Neil Channing	$273,153
3rd	Stuart Rutter	$179,617
4th	Joseph Elpayaa	$125,387
5th	Nicolas Levi	$92,543
6th	Brent Hanks	$71,998

=== Event 7: $2,500 2–7 Triple Draw Lowball ===
- 3-Day Event: Tuesday, June 1, 2010 to Thursday, June 3, 2010
- Number of Entries: 291
- Total Prize Pool: $669,300
- Number of Payouts: 30
- Winning Hand: 9 7 4 3 2

Final Table
Place	Name	Prize
1st	Peter Gelencser (1/1)	$180,730
2nd	Raphael Zimmerman	$111,686
3rd	Don McNamara	$73,803
4th	David Chiu (0/4)	$50,157
5th	Jameson Painter	$34,843
6th	Leonard Martin	$24,723

=== Event 8: $1,500 No Limit Hold'em ===
- 3-Day Event: Wednesday, June 2, 2010 to Friday, June 4, 2010
- Number of Entries: 2,341
- Total Prize Pool: $3,160,350
- Number of Payouts: 243
- Winning Hand: J♠ 6♣

Final Table
Place	Name	Prize
1st	Pascal LeFrancois (1/1)	$568,974
2nd	Max Steinberg	$352,916
3rd	Kevin Howe	$249,351
4th	Daniel Wjuniski	$179,286
5th	David Aue	$130,617
6th	Jim Andersen	$96,422
7th	Kurt Disessa	$72,087
8th	Joshua Brikis	$54,579
9th	Saar Wilf	$41,843

=== Event 9: $1,500 Pot Limit Hold'em ===
- 3-Day Event: Thursday, June 3, 2010 to Saturday, June 5, 2010
- Number of Entries: 650
- Total Prize Pool: $877,500
- Number of Payouts: 63
- Winning Hand: A♦ 10♠

Final Table
Place	Name	Prize
1st	James Dempsey (1/1)	$197,470
2nd	Steve Chanthabouasy	$121,963
3rd	J. J. Liu	$86,512
4th	Mark Babekov	$62,232
5th	Scott Haraden	$45,393
6th	Armen Kara	$33,573
7th	Joseph Williams	$25,166
8th	Edward Brogdon	$19,120
9th	Gregg Wilkerson	$14,715

=== Event 10: $10,000 Seven Card Stud Championship ===
- 3-Day Event: Thursday, June 3, 2010 to Saturday, June 5, 2010
- Number of Entries: 150
- Total Prize Pool: $1,410,000
- Number of Payouts: 16
- Winning Hand: 9♠ 6♦ 10♠ K♣ J♦ 6♣ K♦

Final Table
Place	Name	Prize
1st	Men Nguyen (1/7)	$394,807
2nd	Brandon Adams	$243,958
3rd	Steve Billirakis (0/1)	$152,787
4th	Nikolay Evdakov	$110,628
5th	Joe Cassidy	$86,461
6th	Michael Mizrachi (1/1)	$68,949
7th	Vladimir Shchemelev	$55,991
8th	Sirous Jamshidi	$46,205

=== Event 11: $1,500 No Limit Hold'em ===
- 3-Day Event: Friday, June 4, 2010 to Sunday, June 6, 2010
- Number of Entries: 2,563
- Total Prize Pool: $3,460,050
- Number of Payouts: 270
- Winning Hand: 9♦ 9♣

Final Table
Place	Name	Prize
1st	Simon Watt (1/1)	$614,248
2nd	Tom Dwan	$381,885
3rd	David Randall	$270,299
4th	Austin McCormick	$194,939
5th	Jason Young (0/1)	$142,346
6th	Michael Smith	$105,185
7th	Marvin Rettenmaier	$78,681
8th	Kyle Winter	$59,547
9th	Eric Ladny	$45,603

=== Event 12: $1,500 Limit Hold'em ===
- 3-Day Event: Friday, June 4, 2010 to Sunday, June 6, 2010
- Number of Entries: 625
- Total Prize Pool: $843,750
- Number of Payouts: 63
- Winning Hand: Q♥ 8♦

Final Table
Place	Name	Prize
1st	Matt Matros (1/1)	$189,870
2nd	Ahmad Abghari	$117,272
3rd	Terrence Chan	$83,185
4th	Georgios Kapalas	$59,838
5th	Adrian Dresel-Velasquez	$43,647
6th	Jason Potter	$32,281
7th	Jameson Painter	$24,198
8th	Roberto Truijers	$18,385
9th	Mark Burford	$14,149

=== Event 13: $1,000 No Limit Hold'em ===
- 4-Day Event: Saturday, June 5, 2010 to Tuesday, June 8, 2010
- Number of Entries: 3,042
- Total Prize Pool: $2,737,800
- Number of Payouts: 324
- Winning Hand: A♥ K♥

Final Table
Place	Name	Prize
1st	Steven Gee (1/1)	$472,479
2nd	Matt Vance	$292,232
3rd	David Baker	$206,813
4th	Nicholas Heather	$149,702
5th	Jeffrey Gross	$109,621
6th	Daniel Thomas	$81,203
7th	Kyung Han	$60,833
8th	Jared Hamby	$46,077
9th	Mats Gavatin	$35,290

=== Event 14: $1,500 2–7 Draw Lowball ===
- 3-Day Event: Saturday, June 5, 2010 to Monday, June 7, 2010
- Number of Entries: 250
- Total Prize Pool: $337,500
- Number of Payouts: 28
- Winning Hand: 10♥ 8♦ 7♣ 6♥ 2♥

Final Table
Place	Name	Prize
1st	Yan Chen (1/1)	$92,817
2nd	Mike Wattel (0/1)	$57,375
3rd	Nick Binger	$37,857
4th	Derric Haynie	$25,839
5th	Todd Bui	$18,096
6th	James Bord	$12,997
7th	Alex Kravchenko (0/1)	$9,568

=== Event 15: $10,000 Seven Card Stud Hi-Low Split-8 or Better Championship ===
- 3-Day Event: Sunday, June 6, 2010 to Tuesday, June 8, 2010
- Number of Entries: 170
- Total Prize Pool: $1,598,000
- Number of Payouts: 16
- Winning Hand: 7♦ 7♣ Q♦ 2♥ Q♥ 3♠ J♥

Final Table
Place	Name	Prize
1st	Frank Kassela (1/1)	$447,442
2nd	Allen Kessler	$276,486
3rd	Jennifer Harman (0/2)	$173,159
4th	Steve Zolotow (0/2)	$125,379
5th	John Juanda (0/4)	$97,989
6th	Kirill Rabtsov	$78,142
7th	Vladimir Shchemelev	$63,457
8th	Dario Minieri (0/1)	$52,366

=== Event 16: $1,500 No Limit Hold'em Six Handed ===
- 3-Day Event: Monday, June 7, 2010 to Wednesday, June 9, 2010
- Number of Entries: 1,663
- Total Prize Pool: $2,245,050
- Number of Payouts: 162
- Winning Hand: A♦ K♣

Final Table
Place	Name	Prize
1st	Carter Phillips (1/1)	$482,774
2nd	Samuel Gerber	$298,726
3rd	Craig Bergeron	$189,661
4th	Hugo Perez	$124,690
5th	Russell Thomas	$84,256
6th	David Diaz	$58,483

=== Event 17: $5,000 No Limit Hold'em ===
- 3-Day Event: Tuesday, June 8, 2010 to Thursday, June 10, 2010
- Number of Entries: 792
- Total Prize Pool: $3,722,400
- Number of Payouts: 72
- Winning Hand: 10♠ 8♥

Final Table
Place	Name	Prize
1st	Jason DeWitt (1/1)	$818,959
2nd	Sam Trickett	$505,725
3rd	Jeff Williams	$328,762
4th	Peter Gilmore	$241,472
5th	Amit Makhija	$179,866
6th	David Benefield	$135,718
7th	James Carroll	$103,594
8th	Paul Foltyn	$79,957
9th	Manny Minaya	$62,350

=== Event 18: $2,000 Limit Hold'em ===
- 3-Day Event: Wednesday, June 9, 2010 to Friday, June 11, 2010
- Number of Entries: 476
- Total Prize Pool: $866,320
- Number of Payouts: 45
- Winning Hand: 10♥ 7♦

Final Table
Place	Name	Prize
1st	Eric Buchman (1/1)	$203,607
2nd	Brent Courson	$125,737
3rd	Steven Hustoft	$90,928
4th	Flavio Ferrari Zumbini	$66,446
5th	Hansu Chu	$49,068
6th	William Jensen	$36,619
7th	Matt Grapenthien	$27,609
8th	Gary Bogdanski	$21,025
9th	Matt Matros (1/1)	$16,174

=== Event 19: $10,000 2–7 Draw Lowball Championship ===
- 3-Day Event: Wednesday, June 9, 2010 to Friday, June 11, 2010
- Number of Entries: 101
- Total Prize Pool: $949,400
- Number of Payouts: 14
- Winning Hand: J-10-9-8-4

Final Table
Place	Name	Prize
1st	David Baker (1/1)	$294,321
2nd	Eric Cloutier	$181,886
3rd	George Danzer	$115,295
4th	John Juanda (0/4)	$78,088
5th	Doug Booth	$55,482
6th	Erik Seidel (0/8)	$41,270
7th	Eric Kesselman (0/1)	$32,080

=== Event 20: $1,500 Pot Limit Omaha ===
- 3-Day Event: Thursday, June 10, 2010 to Saturday, June 12, 2010
- Number of Entries: 885
- Total Prize Pool: $1,194,750
- Number of Payouts: 81
- Winning Hand: J♠ 7♠ 8♣ 2♦

Final Table
Place	Name	Prize
1st	John Barch (1/1)	$256,919
2nd	Thibaut Klinghammer	$158,698
3rd	Trai Dang	$102,306
4th	Nenad Medic (0/1)	$74,946
5th	Ashkan Razavi	$55,711
6th	Chris Hyong Chang	$41,971
7th	Blair Rodman (0/1)	$32,007
8th	Tyler Patterson	$24,695
9th	Denton Pfister	$19,259

=== Event 21: $1,500 Seven Card Stud ===
- 3-Day Event: Thursday, June 10, 2010 to Saturday, June 12, 2010
- Number of Entries: 408
- Total Prize Pool: $550,800
- Number of Payouts: 40
- Winning Hand: Q♦ Q♣ 3♥ 7♦ 9♣ 7♠ J♠

Final Table
Place	Name	Prize
1st	Richard Ashby (1/1)	$140,467
2nd	Christine Pietsch	$86,756
3rd	Darren Shebell	$55,955
4th	Dan Heimiller (0/1)	$40,544
5th	Owais Ahmed	$29,809
6th	Sorel Mizzi	$22,235
7th	Pat Pezzin	$16,826
8th	Jon Turner	$12,916

=== Event 22: $1,000 Ladies No Limit Hold'em Championship ===
- 3-Day Event: Friday, June 11, 2010 to Sunday, June 13, 2010
- Number of Entries: 1,054^{[b]}
- Total Prize Pool: $948,600
- Number of Payouts: 117
- Winning Hand: 5♠ 5♦

Final Table
Place	Name	Prize
1st	Vanessa Hellebuyck (1/1)	$192,132
2nd	Sidsel Boesen	$118,897
3rd	Timmi Derosa	$74,389
4th	Allison Whalen	$53,994
5th	Kami Chisholm	$39,860
6th	Holly Hodge	$29,880
7th	La Sengphet	$22,728
8th	Bonnie Overfield	$17,520
9th	Loren Watterworth	$13,688

=== Event 23: $2,500 Limit Hold'em Six Handed ===
- 3-Day Event: Friday, June 11, 2010 to Sunday, June 13, 2010
- Number of Entries: 384
- Total Prize Pool: $883,200
- Number of Payouts: 36
- Winning Hand: J♥ 10♦

Final Table
Place	Name	Prize
1st	Dutch Boyd (1/2)	$234,065
2nd	Brian Meinders	$144,650
3rd	Albert Minnullin	$93,892
4th	Art Parmann	$62,769
5th	Domenico Denotaristefani	$43,117
6th	Al Barbieri	$30,399

=== Event 24: $1,000 No Limit Hold'em ===
- 4-Day Event: Saturday, June 12, 2010 to Wednesday, June 16, 2010
- Number of Entries: 3,289
- Total Prize Pool: $2,960,100
- Number of Payouts: 342
- Winning Hand: K♣ 2♠

Final Table
Place	Name	Prize
1st	Jeffrey Tebben (1/1)	$503,389
2nd	J.D. McNamara	$310,248
3rd	Kiet Tran	$223,665
4th	Denis Murphy	$162,568
5th	David Cai	$119,410
6th	Blake Kelso	$88,654
7th	David Tolbert	$66,513
8th	Greg Pohler	$50,410
9th	Michael Gross	$38,629

=== Event 25: $10,000 Omaha Hi-Low Split-8 or Better Championship ===
- 3-Day Event: Saturday, June 12, 2010 to Monday, June 14, 2010
- Number of Entries: 212
- Total Prize Pool: $1,992,800
- Number of Payouts: 27
- Winning Hand: J♣ 9♥ 7♦ 4♥

Final Table
Place	Name	Prize
1st	Sam Farha (1/3)	$488,241
2nd	James Dempsey (1/1)	$301,789
3rd	Yueqi Zhu	$225,325
4th	Sergey Altbregin	$169,368
5th	Tony Merksick	$128,097
6th	Michael Chow (1/1)	$97,507
7th	Eugene Katchalov	$74,670
8th	Abe Mosseri (0/1)	$57,552
9th	Steve Wong	$44,619

=== Event 26: $2,500 No Limit Hold'em Six Handed ===
- 3-Day Event: Monday, June 14, 2010 to Wednesday, June 16, 2010
- Number of Entries: 1,245
- Total Prize Pool: $2,863,500
- Number of Payouts: 126
- Winning Hand: A♣ J♥

Final Table
Place	Name	Prize
1st	William Haydon (1/1)	$630,031
2nd	Jeffrey Papola	$391,068
3rd	Joe Baldwin	$248,265
4th	Eduard Scharf (0/2)	$163,649
5th	Jarred Solomon	$110,903
6th	Steve Cowley	$77,228

=== Event 27: $1,500 Seven Card Stud Hi-Low-8 or Better ===
- 3-Day Event: Monday, June 14, 2010 to Wednesday, June 16, 2010
- Number of Entries: 644
- Total Prize Pool: $869,400
- Number of Payouts: 64
- Winning Hand: 6♠ 5♠ 3♦ 6♦ 7♠ 7♣ J♦

Final Table
Place	Name	Prize
1st	David Warga (1/2)^{[c]}	$208,682
2nd	Maxwell Troy	$129,253
3rd	David Levi	$87,400
4th	Karina Jett	$60,588
5th	Christopher George	$42,913
6th	Jonathan Bascom	$31,046
7th	Chris Tryba	$22,926
8th	Allen Bari	$17,274

=== Event 28: $2,500 Pot Limit Omaha ===
- 3-Day Event: Tuesday, June 15, 2010 to Thursday, June 17, 2010
- Number of Entries: 596
- Total Prize Pool: $1,370,800
- Number of Payouts: 54
- Winning Hand: A♠ Q♦ Q♥ 2♠

Final Table
Place	Name	Prize
1st	Miguel Proulx (1/1)	$315,311
2nd	Loren Klein	$195,147
3rd	Michael Greco	$129,691
4th	Stephane Tayar	$96,243
5th	Joerg Engels	$72,227
6th	Karl Gal	$54,736
7th	Trevor Pope	$41,850
8th	Tommy Le	$32,254
9th	Patrick Hanoteau	$25,044

=== Event 29: $10,000 Limit Hold'em Championship ===
- 3-Day Event: Tuesday, June 15, 2010 to Thursday, June 17, 2010
- Number of Entries: 171
- Total Prize Pool: $1,607,400
- Number of Payouts: 18
- Winning Hand: A♥ 7♥

Final Table
Place	Name	Prize
1st	Matt Keikoan (1/2)^{[d]}	$425,969
2nd	Daniel Idema	$263,243
3rd	Kyle Ray	$190,701
4th	Jameson Painter	$140,760
5th	Brock Parker (0/2)	$105,782
6th	Zvi Groysman	$80,884
7th	Simon Morris	$62,897
8th	Michael Mizrachi (1/1)	$49,732
9th	David Chiu (0/4)	$39,959

=== Event 30: $1,500 No Limit Hold'em ===
- 3-Day Event: Wednesday, June 16, 2010 to Friday, June 18, 2010
- Number of Entries: 2,394
- Total Prize Pool: $3,231,900
- Number of Payouts: 243
- Winning Hand: A♦ 10♦

Final Table
Place	Name	Prize
1st	Mike Ellis (1/1)	$581,851
2nd	Christopher Gonzales	$360,906
3rd	David Wilkinson	$254,996
4th	Martin Jacobson	$183,345
5th	Billy Griner	$133,574
6th	William Kakon	$98,605
7th	Jason Hallee	$73,719
8th	Christopher Kastler	$55,814
9th	Jeff Cohen	$42,790

=== Event 31: $1,500 H.O.R.S.E. ===
- 3-Day Event: Wednesday, June 16, 2010 to Friday, June 18, 2010
- Number of Entries: 828
- Total Prize Pool: $1,117,800
- Number of Payouts: 80
- Winning Hand: 7♠ A♠ 2♣ 2♠ 7♣ 2♥ 9♠ (Stud 8/OB)

Final Table
Place	Name	Prize
1st	Konstantin Puchkov (1/1)	$256,820
2nd	Al Barbieri	$158,647
3rd	Dustin Leary	$107,849
4th	Ken Lennaárd	$75,058
5th	Hani Awad	$53,321
6th	Andrew Revesz	$38,651
7th	Blake Cahail	$28,569
8th	Robert Mizrachi (0/1)	$21,525

=== Event 32: $5,000 No Limit Hold'em Six Handed ===
- 3-Day Event: Thursday, June 17, 2010 to Saturday, June 19, 2010
- Number of Entries: 568
- Total Prize Pool: $2,669,600
- Number of Payouts: 54
- Winning Hand: J♠ J♦

Final Table
Place	Name	Prize
1st	Jeffrey Papola (1/1)	$667,433
2nd	Men Nguyen (1/7)	$412,746
3rd	Mark Radoja	$262,902
4th	Bruno Launais	$173,123
5th	Orlando Delacruz	$117,595
6th	Erick Lindgren (0/1)	$82,303

=== Event 33: $2,500 Pot Limit Hold'em/Omaha ===
- 3-Day Event: Thursday, June 17, 2010 to Saturday, June 19, 2010
- Number of Entries: 482
- Total Prize Pool: $1,108,600
- Number of Payouts: 45
- Winning Hand: 7♦ 6♣

Final Table
Place	Name	Prize
1st	Luis Velador (1/2)	$260,517
2nd	David Chiu (0/4)	$160,902
3rd	Rob Hollink (0/1)	$116,359
4th	Craig Gray	$85,030
5th	Kevin MacPhee	$62,791
6th	Victor Ramdin	$46,861
7th	James Mitchell	$35,331
8th	Gavin Cochrane	$26,906
9th	Matt Sterling	$20,698

=== Event 34: $1,000 Seniors No Limit Hold'em Championship ===
- 3-Day Event: Friday, June 18, 2010 to Sunday, June 20, 2010
- Number of Entries: 3,142
- Total Prize Pool: $2,827,800
- Number of Payouts: 324
- Winning Hand: K♠ J♠

Final Table
Place	Name	Prize
1st	Harold Angle (1/1)	$487,994
2nd	Michael Minetti	$301,839
3rd	John Woo	$213,612
4th	Eric Stemp	$154,624
5th	Daniel Camillo	$113,225
6th	Preston Derden	$83,872
7th	Ernest Ward	$62,833
8th	Carlos Pianelli	$47,591
9th	Jay Hong	$36,450

=== Event 35: $10,000 Heads Up No Limit Hold'em Championship ===
- 3-Day Event: Friday, June 18, 2010 to Sunday, June 20, 2010
- Number of Entries: 256
- Total Prize Pool: $2,406,400
- Number of Payouts: 32
- Winning Hand: Q♥ 10♥

Final Table
Place	Name	Prize
1st	Ayaz Mahmood (1/1)	$625,682
2nd	Ernst Schmejkal	$386,636
SF	Jason Somerville	$214,289
SF	Alexander Kostritsyn	$214,289
QF	Vanessa Rousso	$92,580
QF	Faraz Jaka	$92,580
QF	Ludovic Lacay	$92,580
QF	Kido Pham	$92,580

=== Event 36: $1,000 No Limit Hold'em ===
- 4-Day Event: Saturday, June 19, 2010 to Tuesday, June 22, 2010
- Number of Entries: 3,102
- Total Prize Pool: $2,791,800
- Number of Payouts: 324
- Winning Hand: A♦ 7♥

Final Table
Place	Name	Prize
1st	Scott Montgomery (1/1)	$481,760
2nd	Mick Carlson	$297,996
3rd	Adam Richardson	$210,892
4th	Daniel Fuhs	$152,655
5th	Sebastien Roy	$111,783
6th	John Dolan	$82,804
7th	Peter Dufek	$62,033
8th	Timothy Beeman	$46,985
9th	Michael Michnik	$35,986

=== Event 37: $3,000 H.O.R.S.E. ===
- 3-Day Event: Saturday, June 19, 2010 to Monday, June 21, 2010
- Number of Entries: 478
- Total Prize Pool: $1,319,280
- Number of Payouts: 48
- Winning Hand: A-2-3-4-5 (Razz)

Final Table
Place	Name	Prize
1st	Phil Ivey (1/8)	$329,840
2nd	Bill Chen (0/2)	$203,802
3rd	John Juanda (0/4)	$129,553
4th	Ken Aldridge (0/1)	$93,418
5th	Jeff Lisandro (0/4)	$68,417
6th	Dave Baker	$50,871
7th	Albert Hahn	$38,391
8th	Chad Brown	$29,406

=== Event 38: $10,000 Pot Limit Hold'em Championship ===
- 3-Day Event: Sunday, June 20, 2010 to Tuesday, June 22, 2010
- Number of Entries: 268
- Total Prize Pool: $2,519,200
- Number of Payouts: 27
- Winning Hand: J♦ 8♦

Final Table
Place	Name	Prize
1st	Valdemar Kwaysser (1/1)	$617,214
2nd	Matt Marafioti	$381,507
3rd	James Calderaro	$284,845
4th	Konstantin Bucherl	$214,106
5th	Dani Stern	$161,934
6th	Tom Marchese	$123,264
7th	Peter Jetten	$94,394
8th	Blair Rodman (0/1)	$72,754
9th	Alexander Kuzmin	$56,404

=== Event 39: $1,500 No Limit Hold'em Shootout ===
- 3-Day Event: Monday, June 21, 2010 to Wednesday, June 23, 2010
- Number of Entries: 1,397
- Total Prize Pool: $1,885,950
- Number of Payouts: 140
- Winning Hand: A♥ 9♦

Final Table
Place	Name	Prize
1st	Steven Kelly (1/1)	$382,725
2nd	Jeffrey King	$237,327
3rd	Derric Haynie	$161,463
4th	Dustin Dirksen	$112,455
5th	Reagan Leman	$78,530
6th	Brett Shaffer	$56,568
7th	Paul Varano	$40,975
8th	Michael Cooper	$30,183
9th	Justin Scott (0/1)	$22,623

=== Event 40: $2,500 Razz ===
- 3-Day Event: Monday, June 21, 2010 to Wednesday, June 23, 2010
- Number of Entries: 365
- Total Prize Pool: $839,500
- Number of Payouts: 40
- Winning Hand: 7–5–4–3–2

Final Table
Place	Name	Prize
1st	Frank Kassela (2/2)	$214,085
2nd	Maxwell Troy	$132,229
3rd	Melville Lewis	$85,284
4th	Vladimir Shchemelev	$61,795
5th	Mikko Pispala	$45,433
6th	Jennifer Harman (0/2)	$33,890
7th	Stuart Rutter	$25,646
8th	Chris Björin (0/2)	$19,686

=== Event 41: $1,500 Pot Limit Omaha Hi-Low Split-8 or Better ===
- 3-Day Event: Tuesday, June 22, 2010 to Thursday, June 24, 2010
- Number of Entries: 847
- Total Prize Pool: $1,143,450
- Number of Payouts: 81
- Winning Hand: A♠ A♥ Q♦ 4♥

Final Table
Place	Name	Prize
1st	Steve Jelinek (1/1)	$245,871
2nd	John Gottlieb	$151,884
3rd	Anders Taylor	$97,913
4th	Michael Chappus	$71,728
5th	Ben Lamb	$53,319
6th	Mendy Commanda (0/1)	$40,169
7th	Phil Hellmuth* (0/11)	$30,633
8th	Ryan Karp	$23,635
9th	Joel Ettedgi	$18,432

=== Event 42: $1,500 No Limit Hold'em ===
- 3-Day Event: Wednesday, June 23, 2010 to Friday, June 25, 2010
- Number of Entries: 2,521
- Total Prize Pool: $3,403,305
- Number of Payouts: 270
- Winning Hand: A♦ Q♥

Final Table
Place	Name	Prize
1st	Dean Hamrick (1/1)	$604,222
2nd	Thomas O'Neal	$375,627
3rd	Ian Wiley	$265,869
4th	Niccolo Caramatti	$191,744
5th	Aaron Kaiser	$140,013
6th	Ryan Hemmel	$103,461
7th	Andrew Rosskamm	$77,392
8th	Thomas Johnson	$58,571
9th	Aaron Gustavson	$44,856

=== Event 43: $10,000 H.O.R.S.E. Championship ===
- 3-Day Event: Wednesday, June 23, 2010 to Friday, June 25, 2010
- Number of Entries: 241
- Total Prize Pool: $2,265,400
- Number of Payouts: 24
- Winning Hand: 9♥ 9♠ (Hold'em)

Final Table
Place	Name	Prize
1st	Ian Gordon (1/1)	$611,666
2nd	Richard Ashby (1/1)	$378,027
3rd	Eugene Katchalov	$248,831
4th	Marco Johnson	$181,503
5th	Matt Glantz	$135,040
6th	Carlos Mortensen (0/2)	$102,237
7th	Nick Schulman (0/1)	$78,654
8th	Marco Traniello	$61,414

=== Event 44: $2,500 Mixed Hold'em ===
- 3-Day Event: Thursday, June 24, 2010 to Saturday, June 26, 2010
- Number of Entries: 507
- Total Prize Pool: $1,166,100
- Number of Payouts: 54
- Winning Hand: A♥ Q♥

Final Table
Place	Name	Prize
1st	Gavin Smith (1/1)	$268,238
2nd	Danny Hannawa	$166,005
3rd	Timothy Finne	$110,324
4th	Michael Michnik	$81,871
5th	Jamie Rosen	$61,441
6th	Jarred Solomon	$46,562
7th	Daniel Idema	$35,601
8th	Dwyte Pilgrim	$27,438
9th	Mike Santoro	$21,304

=== Event 45: $1,500 No Limit Hold'em ===
- 3-Day Event: Friday, June 25, 2010 to Sunday, June 27, 2010
- Number of Entries: 3,097
- Total Prize Pool: $4,180,950
- Number of Payouts: 423
- Winning Hand: 7♥

Final Table
Place	Name	Prize
1st	Jesse Rockowitz (1/1)	$721,373
2nd	Raymond Coburn	$446,274
3rd	Thiago Nishijima	$315,828
4th	Kevin O'Dell	$228,614
5th	Michael Goldfarb	$167,405
6th	Steven Brown	$124,006
7th	Shaun Malough	$92,900
8th	Justin Conley	$70,365
9th	Johan Jakobsson	$53,892

=== Event 46: $5,000 Pot Limit Omaha Hi-Low Split-8 or Better ===
- 3-Day Event: Friday, June 25, 2010 to Sunday, June 27, 2010
- Number of Entries: 284
- Total Prize Pool: $1,334,800
- Number of Payouts: 27
- Winning Hand: K♠ 10♣ 9♠ 8♦

Final Table
Place	Name	Prize
1st	Chris Bell (1/1)	$327,040
2nd	Dan Shak	$202,142
3rd	Dave Ulliott (0/1)	$150,925
4th	Joe Ritzie	$113,444
5th	Erik Seidel (0/8)	$85,800
6th	Leif Force	$65,311
7th	Rob Hollink (0/1)	$50,014
8th	Perry Green (0/3)	$38,549
9th	Jeremy Harkin	$29,886

=== Event 47: $1,000 No Limit Hold'em ===
- 5-Day Event: Saturday, June 26, 2010 to Wednesday, June 30, 2010
- Number of Entries: 3,128
- Total Prize Pool: $2,815,200
- Number of Payouts: 324
- Winning Hand: A♥ 4♠

Final Table
Place	Name	Prize
1st	Shawn Busse (1/1)	$485,791
2nd	Owen Crowe	$300,494
3rd	Pekka Ikonen	$212,660
4th	Chuan Shi	$153,935
5th	Wenlong Jin	$112,720
6th	Ilya Andreev	$83,498
7th	Jason Mann	$62,553
8th	Allan Baekke	$47,379
9th	Adam White	$36,287

=== Event 48: $2,500 Mixed Event (8-Game) ===
- 3-Day Event: Saturday, June 26, 2010 to Monday, June 28, 2010
- Number of Entries: 453
- Total Prize Pool: $1,041,900
- Number of Payouts: 48
- Winning Hand: A♣ 9♠

Final Table
Place	Name	Prize
1st	Sigurd Eskeland (1/1)	$260,497
2nd	Steve Sung (0/1)	$160,952
3rd	Alexander Wice	$102,314
4th	Nikolai Yakovenko	$73,776
5th	Stephen Su	$54,032
6th	Scott Seiver (0/1)	$40,175
7th	Jared Jaffee	$30,319
8th	Kirill Rabtsov	$23,223

=== Event 49: $1,500 No Limit Hold'em ===
- 3-Day Event: Monday, June 28, 2010 to Wednesday, June 30, 2010
- Number of Entries: 2,543
- Total Prize Pool: $3,433,050
- Number of Payouts: 270
- Winning Hand: A♦ 2♣

Final Table
Place	Name	Prize
1st	Michael Linn (1/1)	$609,493
2nd	Taylor Larkin	$378,905
3rd	Mihai Manole	$268,189
4th	Benjamin Smith	$193,418
5th	Chadwick Grimes	$141,235
6th	Alexander Kuzmin	$104,364
7th	Justin Zaki	$78,067
8th	Erle Mankin	$59,082
9th	Tyler Cornell	$45,247

=== Event 50: $5,000 Pot Limit Omaha ===
- 3-Day Event: Monday, June 28, 2010 to Wednesday, June 30, 2010
- Number of Entries: 460
- Total Prize Pool: $2,162,000
- Number of Payouts: 45
- Winning Hand: 6♥ Q♣ 8♥ 9♦

Final Table
Place	Name	Prize
1st	Chance Kornuth (1/1)	$508,090
2nd	Kevin Boudreau	$313,792
3rd	Danny Smith	$226,923
4th	Edward Martin	$165,825
5th	Scott Mandel	$122,455
6th	Julian Gardner	$91,387
7th	Eric Liu	$68,902
8th	Robert Mizrachi (0/1)	$52,471
9th	Jose Barbero	$40,364

=== Event 51: $3,000 Triple Chance No Limit Hold'em ===
- 3-Day Event: Tuesday, June 29, 2010 to Thursday, July 1, 2010
- Number of Entries: 965
- Total Prize Pool: $2,663,400
- Number of Payouts: 90
- Winning Hand: Q♥ J♦

Final Table
Place	Name	Prize
1st	Ryan Welch (1/1)	$559,371
2nd	Jon Eaton	$344,830
3rd	Guillaume Darcourt	$223,459
4th	Will Failla	$163,532
5th	Bradley Craig	$121,451
6th	Sergey Lebedev	$91,407
7th	Tommy Vedes	$69,647
8th	Noel Scruggs	$53,694
9th	Tad Jurgens	$41,842

=== Event 52: $25,000 No Limit Hold'em Six Handed ===
- 4-Day Event: Wednesday, June 30, 2010 to Saturday, July 3, 2010
- Number of Entries: 191
- Total Prize Pool: $4,536,250
- Number of Payouts: 18
- Winning Hand: A♣ 10♦

Final Table
Place	Name	Prize
1st	Dan Kelly (1/1)	$1,315,518
2nd	Shawn Buchanan	$812,941
3rd	Frank Kassela (2/2)	$556,053
4th	Jason Somerville	$386,125
5th	Mikael Thuritz	$272,084
6th	Eugene Katchalov	$194,559

=== Event 53: $1,500 Limit Hold'em Shootout ===
- 3-Day Event: Wednesday, June 30, 2010 to Friday, July 2, 2010
- Number of Entries: 548
- Total Prize Pool: $739,800
- Number of Payouts: 64
- Winning Hand: A♦ 7♦

Final Table
Place	Name	Prize
1st	Brendan Taylor (1/1)	$184,950
2nd	Ben Yu	$114,484
3rd	Jonathan Little	$73,218
4th	Joseph McGowan	$48,546
5th	Brian Tate	$33,276
6th	Mike Schneider	$23,563
7th	Sijbrand Maal	$17,215
8th	Terrence Chan	$12,961

=== Event 54: $1,000 No Limit Hold'em ===
- 4-Day Event: Thursday, July 1, 2010 to Sunday, July 4, 2010
- Number of Entries: 3,844
- Total Prize Pool: $3,459,000
- Number of Payouts: 396
- Winning Hand: A♥ 3♥

Final Table
Place	Name	Prize
1st	Marcel Vonk (1/1)	$570,960
2nd	David Peters	$350,803
3rd	Paul Kerr	$255,076
4th	Nathan Jessen	$186,818
5th	Henrik Tollefsen	$138,107
6th	Matthew Lupton	$103,061
7th	Mehul Chaudhari	$77,633
8th	Espen Moen	$59,020
9th	Dustin Dorrance-Bowman	$45,286

=== Event 55: $10,000 Pot Limit Omaha Championship ===
- 3-Day Event: Thursday, July 1, 2010 to Saturday, July 3, 2010
- Number of Entries: 346
- Total Prize Pool: $3,252,400
- Number of Payouts: 36
- Winning Hand: 7♠ 6♣ 5♠ 5♥

Final Table
Place	Name	Prize
1st	Daniel Alaei (1/3)	$780,599
2nd	Miguel Proulx (1/1)	$482,265
3rd	Ville Mattila	$354,218
4th	Ludovic Lacay	$262,208
5th	Trevor Uyesugi	$195,631
6th	Stephen Pierson	$147,138
7th	Dmitry Stelmak	$111,524
8th	Alexander Kravchenko (0/1)	$85,180
9th	Matthew Wheat	$65,568

=== Event 56: $2,500 No Limit Hold'em ===
- 3-Day Event: Friday, July 2, 2010 to Sunday, July 4, 2010
- Number of Entries: 1,942
- Total Prize Pool: $4,466,600
- Number of Payouts: 198
- Winning Hand: A♦ 4♣

Final Table
Place	Name	Prize
1st	Tomer Berda (1/1)	$825,976
2nd	Vladimir Kochelaevskiy	$510,939
3rd	Bryan Porter	$353,260
4th	Salvatore Bonavena	$254,777
5th	Mike Wattel (0/1)	$186,250
6th	Hungcheng Hung	$137,946
7th	Ali Alawadhi	$103,527
8th	Joseph Curcio	$78,705
9th	Alfonso Amendola	$60,580

=== Event 57: $10,000 No Limit Hold'em Championship ===
- 13-Day Event: Monday, July 5, 2010 to Saturday, July 17, 2010
- Final Table: Saturday, November 6, 2010 to Tuesday, November 9, 2010
- Number of Entries: 7,319
- Total Prize Pool: $68,798,600
- Number of Payouts: 747
- Winning Hand: A♠ J♥

Final Table
Place	Name	Prize
1st	Jonathan Duhamel (1/1)	$8,944,310
2nd	John Racener	$5,545,955
3rd	Joseph Cheong	$4,130,049
4th	Filippo Candio	$3,092,545
5th	Michael Mizrachi (1/1)	$2,332,992
6th	John Dolan	$1,772,959
7th	Jason Senti	$1,356,720
8th	Matthew Jarvis	$1,045,743
9th	Soi Nguyen	$811,823

== Notes ==
^{a} Robert and Michael Mizrachi's appearance at the final table of the $50,000 Player's Championship is only the third time in WSOP history that two siblings faced each other at the final table of a WSOP event. Howard Lederer and Annie Duke both made it to the final table in 1998 in a Seven-Card Stud event and Ross and Barny Boatman made it to the final table in 2002 in a pot-limit Omaha event.

^{b} While the event is called the "Ladies Championship" the WSOP cannot ban men from participating. In past years, a few men have played in the Ladies Championship, but in 2010 at least half a dozen and "some estimates on the floor are that the number of men who entered the event is in the double digits." WSOP Communications Director Seth Palansky called the men "scumbags" and declared, "The good news is at the World Series of Poker, we have the right to refuse service to anyone at any time at any point that we deem, as operators of the event."

^{c} David Warga became the first person to win the Casino Employees' Championship to win a second bracelet in an open event.

^{d} With the big blind at $240,000, Matt Keikoan was heads up with Daniel Idema with only $300,000 in chips. He jokingly announced, "Greatest comeback in history right here," before making a comeback to win the event.
