= World Poker Tour season 8 results =

Below are the results of season eight of the World Poker Tour (2009-2010)

== Results ==
=== WPT Venice ===
- Casino: Casino Di Venezia, Venice, Italy
- Buy-in: $5,302 + $530
- 5-Day Event: May 6, 2009 to May 10, 2009
- Number of Entries: 397
- Total Prize Pool: $2,035,237
- Number of Payouts: 45
- Winning Hand: 4♦ 4♠

Final Table
Place	Name	Prize
1st	Sven Ragnar Åström	$532,388
2nd	Martin Jacobson	$319,518
3rd	Vincent Pasdeloup	$213,699
4th	Michael McDonald	$146,542
5th	Michele Slama-Saad	$116,013
6th	Mario Adinolfi	$89,552

=== WPT Spanish Championship ===
- Casino: Casino Barcelona, Barcelona, Spain
- Buy-in: $6,988 + $419
- 5-Day Event: June 26, 2009 to June 30, 2009
- Number of Entries: 160
- Total Prize Pool: $1,121,815
- Number of Payouts: 9

Final Table
Place	Name	Prize
1st	Mark Flowers	$388,453
2nd	Per Sjogren	$200,515
3rd	Dan Bitsch	$117,785
4th	Roland van Morckhoven	$86,937
5th	Josef Samanek	$70,671
6th	Martin Wendt	$58,894

=== Bellagio Cup V ===
- Casino: Bellagio, Las Vegas, Nevada
- Buy-in: $15,000 + $400
- 7-Day Event: July 13, 2009 to July 19, 2009
- Number of Entries: 268
- Total Prize Pool: $3,899,400
- Number of Payouts: 27
- Winning Hand: A♣ J♥

Final Table
Place	Name	Prize
1st	Alexandre Gomes	$1,187,670
2nd	Faraz Jaka	$774,780
3rd	Justin Smith	$464,870
4th	Alec Torelli	$271,165
5th	Christoffer Sonesson	$203,385
6th	Erik Seidel	$164,640

=== Legends of Poker ===
- Casino: The Bicycle Casino, Bell Gardens, California
- Buy-in: $9,800 + $200
- 5-Day Event: August 22, 2009 to August 26, 2009
- Number of Entries: 279
- Total Prize Pool: $2,625,000
- Number of Payouts: 27
- Winning Hand: A♥ Q♠

Final Table
Place	Name	Prize
1st	Prahlad Friedman	$1,009,000
2nd	Kevin Schaffel	$471,670
3rd	Todd Terry	$231,300
4th	Alfredo Leonidas	$144,600
5th	Sam Stein	$116,225
6th	Mike Krescanko	$89,220

=== WPT Slovakia ===
- Casino: Golden Vegas, Bratislava, Slovakia
- Buy-in: €4,000 + €400
- 5-Day Event: August 31, 2009 to September 4, 2009
- Number of Entries: 100
- Total Prize Pool:
- Number of Payouts: 18

Final Table
Place	Name	Prize
1st	Richard Toth	€104,000
2nd	Boris Zeleny	€66,000
3rd	Sasa Standé	€42,000
4th	Alec Torelli	€31,000
5th	Péter Traply	€25,000
6th	Marek Tatar	€20,000

=== WPT Merit Cyprus Classic ===
- Casino: Merit Crystal Cove Hotel and Casino, Cyprus
- Buy-in: $10,000 + $300
- 7-Day Event: September 6, 2009 to September 12, 2009
- Number of Entries: 181
- Total Prize Pool: $1,810,000
- Number of Payouts: 18
- Winning Hand: 7♥ 7♦

Final Table
Place	Name	Prize
1st	Thomas Bichon	$579,165
2nd	Uri Keider	$380,645
3rd	Steven Fung	$216,275
4th	Rep Porter	$121,115
5th	Janar Kiivramees	$90,835
6th	Rony Jazzar	$73,535

=== Borgata Poker Open ===
- Casino: Borgata, Atlantic City, New Jersey
- Buy-in: $3,300 + $200
- 6-Day Event: September 19, 2009 to September 24, 2009
- Number of Entries: 1,018
- Total Prize Pool: $3,359,400
- Number of Payouts: 100
- Winning Hand: A♠ 4♦

Final Table
Place	Name	Prize
1st	Olivier Busquet	$925,514
2nd	Jeremy Brown	$453,519
3rd	Ivan Mamuzic	$251,955
4th	Yanick Brodeur	$216,681
5th	Keith Crowder	$188,126
6th	Kenny Nguyen	$156,212

=== WPT Marrakech ===
- Casino: Casino De Marrakech, Marrakesh, Morocco
- Buy-in: €4,500
- 8-Day Event: October 12, 2009 to October 19, 2009
- Number of Entries: 416
- Total Prize Pool: €1,812,000
- Number of Payouts: 54
- Winning Hand: 8♣ 7♣

Final Table
Place	Name	Prize
1st	Christophe Savary	€377,262
2nd	Eoghan O'Dea	€262,446
3rd	Ludovic Lacay	€164,182
4th	Julien Arneodo	€105,077
5th	Adrian Marin	€72,240
6th	Benny Spindler	€55,828

=== Festa al Lago ===
- Casino: Bellagio, Las Vegas, Nevada
- Buy-in: $15,000 + $400
- 7-Day Event: October 20, 2009 to October 26, 2009
- Number of Entries: 275
- Total Prize Pool: $4,001,250
- Number of Payouts: 27
- Winning Hand: K♦ Q♦

Final Table
Place	Name	Prize
1st	Tommy Vedes	$1,218,225
2nd	Jason Lavallee	$795,150
3rd	Craig Crivello	$477,090
4th	Freddy Deeb	$278,300
5th	Jason Burt	$208,725
6th	Shawn Cunix	$168,970

=== World Poker Finals ===
- Casino: Foxwoods Resort Casino, Mashantucket, Connecticut
- Buy-in: $9,700 + $300
- 6-Day Event: November 5, 2009 to November 10, 2009
- Number of Entries: 353
- Total Prize Pool: $3,424,100
- Number of Payouts: 36
- Winning Hand: A♠ J♥

Final Table
Place	Name	Prize
1st	Cornel Andrew Cimpan	$910,058
2nd	Soheil Shamseddin	$463,332
3rd	Matt Stout	$265,710
4th	Eric Froehlich	$232,496
5th	Curt Kohlberg	$199,283
6th	Lee Markholt	$166,069

=== Doyle Brunson Five Diamond World Poker Classic ===
- Casino: Bellagio, Las Vegas, Nevada
- Buy-in: $15,000 + $400
- 7-Day Event: December 13, 2009 to December 19, 2009
- Number of Entries: 329
- Total Prize Pool: $4,761,450
- Number of Payouts: 27
- Winning Hand: 10♥ 8♦

Final Table
Place	Name	Prize
1st	Daniel Alaei	$1,428,430
2nd	Josh Arieh	$952,290
3rd	Faraz Jaka	$571,374
4th	Shawn Buchanan	$333,302
5th	Scotty Nguyen	$249,976
6th	Steve O'Dwyer	$202,362

=== Southern Poker Championship ===
- Casino: Beau Rivage, Biloxi, Mississippi
- Buy-in: $9,700 + $300
- 4-Day Event: January 24, 2010 to January 27, 2010
- Number of Entries: 208
- Total Prize Pool: $1,930,000
- Number of Payouts: 18
- Winning Hand: A♥ 7♣

Final Table
Place	Name	Prize
1st	Hoyt Corkins	$739,486
2nd	Jonathan Kantor	$366,643
3rd	Jerry Van Strydonck	$196,829
4th	Jared Jaffee	$135,079
5th	James Reed	$106,134
6th	Tyler Smith	$86,837

=== WPT Invitational ===
- Casino: Commerce Casino, Commerce, California
- Buy-in:
- 2-Day Event: February 20, 2010
- Number of Entries: 564
- Total Prize Pool: $200,000
- Number of Payouts:
- Winning Hand: 3♠ 2♣

Final Table
Place	Name	Prize
1st	Leron Washington	$100,000
2nd	Sean Urban	$50,000
3rd	Trishelle Cannatella	$20,000
4th	Neev Baram	$15,000
5th	Thor Hansen	$10,000
6th	Steven Elliott	$5,000

=== L.A. Poker Classic ===
- Casino: Commerce Casino, Commerce, California
- Buy-in: $9,600 + $400
- 6-Day Event: February 26, 2010 to March 4, 2010
- Number of Entries: 745
- Total Prize Pool: $7,152,000
- Number of Payouts: 72
- Winning Hand: Q♥ 8♥

Final Table
Place	Name	Prize
1st	Andras Koroknai	$1,788,001
2nd	Raymond Dolan	$1,002,710
3rd	Tri Huynh	$665,136
4th	Gevork Kasabyan	$450,576
5th	Jean-Claude Moussa	$321,840
6th	Michael Kamran	$246,744

=== Bay 101 Shooting Star ===
- Casino: Bay 101, San Jose, California
- Buy-in: $9,600 + $400
- 5-Day Event: March 8, 2010 to March 12, 2010
- Number of Entries: 333
- Total Prize Pool: $3,163,500
- Number of Payouts: 36
- Winning Hand: 8♣ 8♦

Final Table
Place	Name	Prize
1st	McLean Karr	$878,500
2nd	Andy Seth	$521,500
3rd	Dan O'Brien	$292,800
4th	Hasan Habib	$234,300
5th	Matt Keikoan	$175,700
6th	Phil Hellmuth	$117,000

=== Hollywood Poker Open ===
- Casino: Hollywood Casino, Lawrenceburg, Indiana
- Buy-in: $9,600 + $400
- 5-Day Event: March 20, 2010 to March 24, 2010
- Number of Entries: 144
- Total Prize Pool: $1,331,616
- Number of Payouts: 12
- Winning Hand: K♣ 10♦

Final Table
Place	Name	Prize
1st	Carlos Mortensen	$391,212
2nd	Mike Mustafa	$222,040
3rd	Frank Calo	$166,530
4th	Chris Bell	$124,081
5th	Ravi Raghavan	$104,489
6th	Jerry Payne	$88,163

=== WPT Bucharest ===
- Casino: Regent Casino, Bucharest, Romania
- Buy-in: €3,000 + €300
- 8-Day Event: March 27, 2010 to April 2, 2010
- Number of Entries: 161
- Total Prize Pool: €449,450
- Number of Payouts: 18
- Winning Hand: Q♦ 9♣

Final Table
Place	Name	Prize
1st	Guillaume Darcourt	€144,530
2nd	Simon Münz	€93,400
3rd	Joseph Ebanks	€59,750
4th	Jose Guardia	€36,600
5th	Abdula Atila	€30,550
6th	Eva Iosif	€23,150

=== WPT Championship ===
- Casino: Bellagio, Las Vegas, Nevada
- Buy-in: $25,000 + $500
- 8-Day Event: April 17, 2010 to April 24, 2010
- Number of Entries: 195
- Total Prize Pool: $4,728,750
- Number of Payouts: 18
- Winning Hand: 2♣ 2♦

Final Table
Place	Name	Prize
1st	David Williams	$1,530,537
2nd	Eric Baldwin	$1,034,715
3rd	Shawn Buchanan	$587,906
4th	David Benyamine	$329,228
5th	Billy Baxter	$246,921
6th	John O'Shea	$199,888

== Other Events ==
During season 8 of the WPT there was one special event that did not apply to the Player of the Year standings:

- The WPT Celebrity Invitational - February 20–21, 2010 - Commerce Casino - prelude to Event #13: L.A. Poker Classic
