= Faraz Jaka =

American poker player and businessman (born 1985)

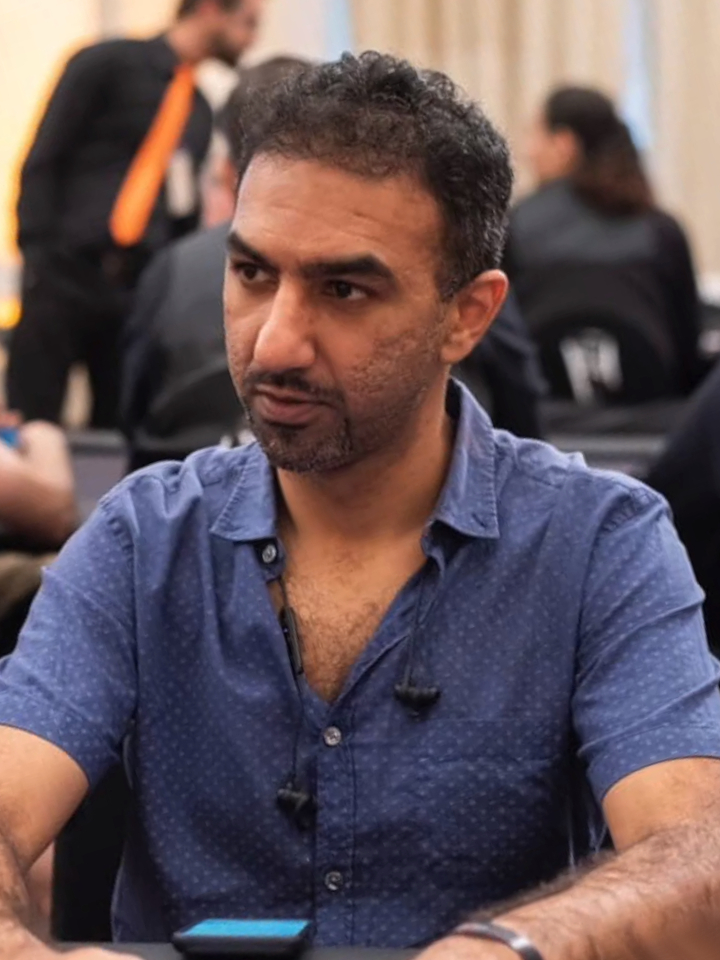
- Jaka in 2019
- Nickname: "The Toilet"
- Born: September 9, 1985 (age 41); San Jose, California, U.S.

World Series of Poker
- Bracelet: 1
- Final tables: 9
- Money finishes: 65
- Highest WSOP Main Event finish: 219th, 2023

World Poker Tour
- Title: 1
- Final tables: 7
- Money finishes: 18

Faraz Jaka (born September 9, 1985, in San Jose, California) is an American professional poker player and businessman who was World Poker Tour (WPT) Player of the Year for Season VIII (2009–2010). He has reached two WPT final tables, six WSOP final tables and his lifetime tournament winnings exceed $10 million.

In 2023, Jaka won his first WSOP bracelet in the $1,500 Shootout No-Limit Hold'em event, marking a significant milestone in his poker career.

Jaka is also the founder of JAKA Coaching, a poker training site launched in 2021. The platform has gained significant traction, with numerous students achieving deep runs in major tournaments worldwide, further solidifying his influence in the poker community.

Previously, Jaka was involved in the creation of Checkraise, a poker site aimed at the Brazilian market, live between 2017 and 2019.

== Early life ==
Jaka is from San Jose, California and is of Pakistani descent. He attended Piedmont Hills High School, and during this time, Jaka ran track, breaking 2:00 in the half mile and 4:30 in the mile. He also played for the basketball team, wrote poetry and became an avid hip-hop fan. Jaka often says it was during this time that he developed the competitive spirit and mental fortitude that would help him in his poker career.

== Poker ==
=== Early career ===
Jaka began his poker career playing online and in small live games during his freshman year at the University of Illinois at Urbana–Champaign. Early on, with little knowledge of the game, Jaka had a habit of playing any two suited hole cards with the intent to draw to a flush. His frequent use of this play quickly earned him the nickname "The Toilet". Jaka embraced the tag, adopting it as his online alias, and the moniker has stuck ever since.

Jaka found early success in high-stake online cash games, soon building his bankroll to more than $170,000 during his sophomore year in college. But as he began playing beyond his means, he was challenging the odds, and probability caught up with him.

“I lost it all,” said Jaka. “It was bound to happen, playing those stakes. At the same time, it was a good life lesson. It made me a lot stronger. A lot of people may have given up at that point, but I reviewed what I’d done wrong and learned from my mistakes.”

After some soul searching, Jaka bounced back, switching up his approach and opting to play low buy-in tournaments and sit-and-gos rather than cash games. Today, Jaka credits his decision to focus on studying tournament strategy as essential to his success.

=== World Poker Tour ===
Jaka has thirteen cashes at the World Poker Tour (WPT), including five final tables. In 2024, he demonstrated his short-handed skillset by winning the WPT Rock 'N' Roll Poker Open $10,000 Deep Stack for $313,495 after a grueling heads-up battle against Phillip Krnyaich that lasted several hours.

His first final table appearance came at the WPT Bellagio Cup V, where he finished runner-up to Alexandre Gomes, earning $774,780. Other final table professionals included: Justin Smith (3rd), Alec Torelli (4th) and Erik Seidel (6th). In the same season, Jaka made another final table at the WPT Doyle Brunson Five Diamond World Poker Classic, finishing third for $571,374, behind the winner Daniel Alaei and runner-up Josh Arieh. This final table also featured Shawn Buchanan(4th) and Scotty Nguyen (5th). He also made a deep run in the $25,000 WPT Championship event where he finished in 14th place earning $51,736.

=== World Series of Poker ===
At the World Series of Poker (WSOP), Jaka achieved a major career milestone in 2023 by winning his first gold bracelet in the $1,500 Shootout event at the Horseshoe and Paris Las Vegas. He conquered a field of 987 players to claim victory and earned $237,367.

Jaka has sixty five cashes, including nine final tables, one where he finished in third place behind the winner Matt Hawrilenko and runner-up Josh Brikis at the 2008 World Series of Poker in the $5,000 No Limit Hold'em – Six Handed event and received $400,525. Later at the 2010 World Series of Poker, he made it to the quarterfinal round of 256 entries in the $10,000 Heads-Up No-Limit Hold'em Championship earning $94,956. In 2017, Jaka made other two final tables ($10,000 No-Limit Hold'em Championship and the $2,620 No-Limit Hold'em The Marathon), cashing a total of five events this summer, which totaled over $272,000 in winnings.

=== World Series of Poker bracelets ===
Year	Tournament	Prize (US$)
2023	$1,500 Shootout No-Limit Hold'em	$237,367

=== Other poker events ===
Jaka won the $1,000 No Limit Hold'em event at the 2008 L.A. Poker Classic, earning $104,900 the event was held at the Commerce Casino in Los Angeles. At the North American Poker Tour (NAPT) in 2010 in the $25,000 Invitational High Roller Bounty Shootout, Jaka came in fifth winning $95,000 which includes the bounties that were won. In 2012 at the Pokerstars Caribbean Adventure, he finished third for $755,000. He led the tournament on day 2 and at the beginning of the final table.

As of 2024, his total live tournament winnings exceed $7,300,000.

== Entrepreneurship ==
Faraz Jaka received bachelor degrees in economics and business from the University of Illinois at Urbana–Champaign and has often been quoted as saying he considers himself "a businessman first and a poker player second." As he has experienced increased success in the poker world, Jaka has made good on this statement, investing his earnings in real estate and startups.

Between 2017 and 2019, Jaka launched a poker site called Checkraise in the Brazilian market. He declared in an interview that he worked over 50 hours per week on this project, dedicating less time to playing poker.

Since 2021, Jaka has operated JAKA Coaching, a poker training website that offers weekly live lessons and a library of training videos.] Students of the program have achieved tournament wins in various international events.
