= 2010 World Series of Poker =

Series of poker tournaments

- Location: Rio All-Suite Hotel and Casino, Las Vegas, Nevada
- Dates: May 28 – July 17

Champion
- (Canada) Jonathan Duhamel

The 2010 World Series of Poker was the 41st annual World Series of Poker (WSOP), held at the Rio All-Suite Hotel and Casino in Paradise, Nevada, and ran from May 28 to July 17. There were 57 bracelet events, culminating in the $10,000 No Limit Hold'em Championship that began on July 5. The November Nine concept returned for the third year, with the Main Event finalists returning on November 6.

A notable change from 2009 was the revamping of the $50,000 buy-in tournament. From its inception in 2006 through 2009, it had been a H.O.R.S.E. event in which play rotated between Texas hold 'em, Omaha 8-or-better, Razz, stud, and stud 8-or-better, all played with a limit betting structure. In 2010, it became an "8-game" tournament, rotating between the five H.O.R.S.E. games followed by rounds of no-limit hold 'em, pot-limit Omaha (high only), and limit 2–7 triple draw. Once the final table was reached, play switched exclusively to no-limit hold 'em (as was the case in the 2006 H.O.R.S.E. event). The tournament, now known as The Poker Player's Championship, was moved to the second spot on the WSOP schedule, preceded only by the restricted $500 Casino Employees No Limit Hold'em event. Thus, the 2010 WSOP open events started with The Poker Player's Championship and ended with the No Limit Hold'em Championship/Main Event. Several celebrities were in attendance, including Ben Affleck, Matt Damon, and Ray Romano.

== Event schedule ==
#	Event	Entrants	Winner	Prize	Runner-up	Results
1	$500 Casino Employees No Limit Hold'em	721	Hoai Pham (1/1)	$71,424	Arthur Vea	Results
2	$50,000 Poker Players Championship	116	Michael Mizrachi (1/1)	$1,559,046	Vladimir Shchemelev	Results
3	$1,000 No Limit Hold'em	4,345	Aadam Daya (1/1)	$625,872	Deepak Bhatti	Results
4	$1,500 Omaha Hi-Low Split-8 or Better	818	Michael Chow (1/1)	$237,140	Dan Heimiller (0/1)	Results
5	$1,500 No Limit Hold'em	2,092	Praz Bansi (1/2)	$515,501	Vincent Jacques	Results
6	$5,000 No Limit Hold'em Shootout	358	Joshua Tieman (1/1)	$441,692	Neil Channing	Results
7	$2,500 2–7 Triple Draw Lowball	291	Peter Gelencser (1/1)	$180,730	Raphael Zimmerman	Results
8	$1,500 No Limit Hold'em	2,341	Pascal LeFrancois (1/1)	$568,974	Max Steinberg	Results
9	$1,500 Pot Limit Hold'em	650	James Dempsey (1/1)	$197,470	Steve Chanthabouasy	Results
10	$10,000 Seven Card Stud Championship	150	Men Nguyen (1/7)	$394,807	Brandon Adams	Results
11	$1,500 No Limit Hold'em	2,563	Simon Watt (1/1)	$614,248	Tom Dwan	Results
12	$1,500 Limit Hold'em	625	Matt Matros (1/1)	$189,870	Ahmad Abghari	Results
13	$1,000 No Limit Hold'em	3,042	Steven Gee (1/1)	$472,479	Matt Vance	Results
14	$1,500 No Limit 2–7 Draw Lowball	250	Yan Chen (1/1)	$92,817	Mike Wattel (0/1)	Results
15	$10,000 Seven Card Stud Hi-Low Split-8 or Better Championship	170	Frank Kassela (1/1)	$447,442	Allen Kessler	Results
16	$1,500 No Limit Hold'em Six Handed	1,663	Carter Phillips (1/1)	$482,774	Samuel Gerber	Results
17	$5,000 No Limit Hold'em	792	Jason DeWitt (1/1)	$818,959	Sam Trickett	Results
18	$2,000 Limit Hold'em	476	Eric Buchman (1/1)	$203,607	Brent Courson	Results
19	$10,000 No Limit 2–7 Draw Lowball Championship	101	David Baker (1/1)	$294,321	Eric Cloutier	Results
20	$1,500 Pot Limit Omaha	885	John Barch (1/1)	$256,919	Thibaut Klinghammer	Results
21	$1,500 Seven Card Stud	408	Richard Ashby (1/1)	$140,467	Christine Pietsch	Results
22	$1,000 Ladies No Limit Hold'em Championship	1,054	Vanessa Hellebuyck (1/1)	$192,132	Sidsel Boesen	Results
23	$2,500 Limit Hold'em Six Handed	384	Dutch Boyd (1/2)	$234,065	Brian Meinders	Results
24	$1,000 No Limit Hold'em	3,289	Jeffrey Tebben (1/1)	$503,389	J.D. McNamara	Results
25	$10,000 Omaha Hi-Low Split-8 or Better Championship	212	Sam Farha (1/3)	$488,241	James Dempsey (1/1)	Results
26	$2,500 No Limit Hold'em Six Handed	1,245	William Haydon (1/1)	$630,031	Jeffrey Papola	Results
27	$1,500 Seven Card Stud Hi-Low-8 or Better	644	David Warga (1/2)	$208,682	Maxwell Troy	Results
28	$2,500 Pot Limit Omaha	596	Miguel Proulx (1/1)	$315,311	Loren Klein	Results
29	$10,000 Limit Hold'em Championship	171	Matt Keikoan (1/2)	$425,969	Daniel Idema	Results
30	$1,500 No Limit Hold'em	2,394	Mike Ellis (1/1)	$581,851	Christopher Gonzales	Results
31	$1,500 H.O.R.S.E.	828	Konstantin Puchkov (1/1)	$256,820	Al Barbieri	Results
32	$5,000 No Limit Hold'em Six Handed	568	Jeffrey Papola (1/1)	$667,433	Men Nguyen (1/7)	Results
33	$2,500 Pot Limit Hold'em/Omaha	482	Luis Velador (1/2)	$260,517	David Chiu (0/4)	Results
34	$1,000 Seniors No Limit Hold'em Championship	3,142	Harold Angle (1/1)	$487,994	Michael Minetti	Results
35	$10,000 Heads Up No Limit Hold'em Championship	256	Ayaz Mahmood (1/1)	$625,682	Ernst Schmejkal	Results
36	$1,000 No Limit Hold'em	3,102	Scott Montgomery (1/1)	$481,760	Mick Carlson	Results
37	$3,000 H.O.R.S.E.	478	Phil Ivey (1/8)	$329,840	Bill Chen (0/2)	Results
38	$10,000 Pot Limit Hold'em Championship	268	Valdemar Kwaysser (1/1)	$617,214	Matt Marafioti	Results
39	$1,500 No Limit Hold'em Shootout	1,397	Steven Kelly (1/1)	$382,725	Jeffrey King	Results
40	$2,500 Seven Card Razz	365	Frank Kassela (2/2)	$214,085	Maxwell Troy	Results
41	$1,500 Pot Limit Omaha Hi-Low Split-8 or Better	847	Steve Jelinek (1/1)	$245,871	John Gottlieb	Results
42	$1,500 No Limit Hold'em	2,521	Dean Hamrick (1/1)	$604,222	Thomas O'Neal	Results
43	$10,000 H.O.R.S.E. Championship	241	Ian Gordon (1/1)	$611,666	Richard Ashby (1/1)	Results
44	$2,500 Mixed Hold'em	507	Gavin Smith (1/1)	$268,238	Danny Hannawa	Results
45	$1,500 No Limit Hold'em	3,097	Jesse Rockowitz (1/1)	$721,373	Raymond Coburn	Results
46	$5,000 Pot Limit Omaha Hi-Low Split-8 or Better	284	Chris Bell (1/1)	$327,040	Dan Shak	Results
47	$1,000 No Limit Hold'em	3,128	Shawn Busse (1/1)	$485,791	Owen Crowe	Results
48	$2,500 Mixed Event	453	Sigurd Eskeland (1/1)	$260,497	Steve Sung (0/1)	Results
49	$1,500 No Limit Hold'em	2,543	Michael Linn (1/1)	$609,493	Taylor Larkin	Results
50	$5,000 Pot Limit Omaha	460	Chance Kornuth (1/1)	$508,090	Kevin Boudreau	Results
51	$3,000 Triple Chance No Limit Hold'em	965	Ryan Welch (1/1)	$559,371	Jon Eaton	Results
52	$25,000 No Limit Hold'em Six Handed	191	Dan Kelly (1/1)	$1,315,518	Shawn Buchanan	Results
53	$1,500 Limit Hold'em Shootout	548	Brendan Taylor (1/1)	$184,950	Ben Yu	Results
54	$1,000 No Limit Hold'em	3,844	Marcel Vonk (1/1)	$570,960	David Peters	Results
55	$10,000 Pot Limit Omaha Championship	346	Daniel Alaei (1/3)	$780,599	Miguel Proulx (1/1)	Results
56	$2,500 No Limit Hold'em	1,942	Tomer Berda (1/1)	$825,976	Vladimir Kochelaevskiy	Results
57	$10,000 No Limit Hold'em Championship (The Main Event)	7,319	Jonathan Duhamel (1/1)	$8,944,310	John Racener	Results

== Achievements ==
- Robert and Michael Mizrachi's appearance at the final table of the $50,000 Player's Championship is only the third time in WSOP history that two siblings faced each other at the final table of a WSOP event. In 1995, Howard Lederer and Annie Duke made the final table in a pot-limit Hold'em event and in 2002, Ross and Barny Boatman made it to the final table in a pot-limit Omaha event.
- While the event is called the "Ladies Championship," the WSOP cannot ban men from participating. In past years, a few men have played in the Ladies Championship, but in 2010 at least half a dozen and "some estimates on the floor are that the number of men who entered the event is in the double digits." WSOP Communications Director Seth Palansky called the men "scumbags" and declared, “The good news is at the World Series of Poker, we have the right to refuse service to anyone at any time at any point that we deem, as operators of the event.”
- Robert and Michael Mizrachi were also part of another sibling milestone. They and their brothers Eric and Donny became the first set of four siblings ever to cash in the same Main Event. Eric finished in 718th place on Day 4, Donny finished in 345th place on Day 5 and Robert finished in 116th place on Day 6, while Michael made the final table and played for the title in November, when he finished fifth.
- Breeze Zuckerman won the 2010 Last Woman Standing Cup in the Main Event, finishing 121st and cashing for $57,201.

== Main Event ==
The $10,000 No Limit Texas Hold 'em Championship Main Event began on July 5 with the first of four starting days. Each of the participants at the 2010 WSOP Main Event received 30,000 in tournament chips for the $10,000 buy-in event. After reaching the final table of nine players on July 17, the final table was delayed until November 6.

The total number of entrants in the 2010 Main Event was 7,319 with a prize pool of $68,798,600 with the winner receiving $8,944,138 for first place. The payout "bubble" was reached during Day 4 at 747 players, each of whom earned a minimum of $19,263. The bubble finisher (748th place) was Tim McDonald, a professional angler and recreational poker player from Lexington, Kentucky; he received the consolation prize of a guaranteed seat in the 2011 WSOP Main Event. Matt Affleck, with his 15th-place finish in this year’s championship combined with an 80th-place in 2009, outlasted 13,718 players in back-to-back years, which is the fourth-most in WSOP history. (Stefan Mattsson - 15,052 in 2006 & 2007, Humberto Brenes - 15,012 in 2006 & 2007, Joseph Hachem - 14,153 in 2005 & 2006)

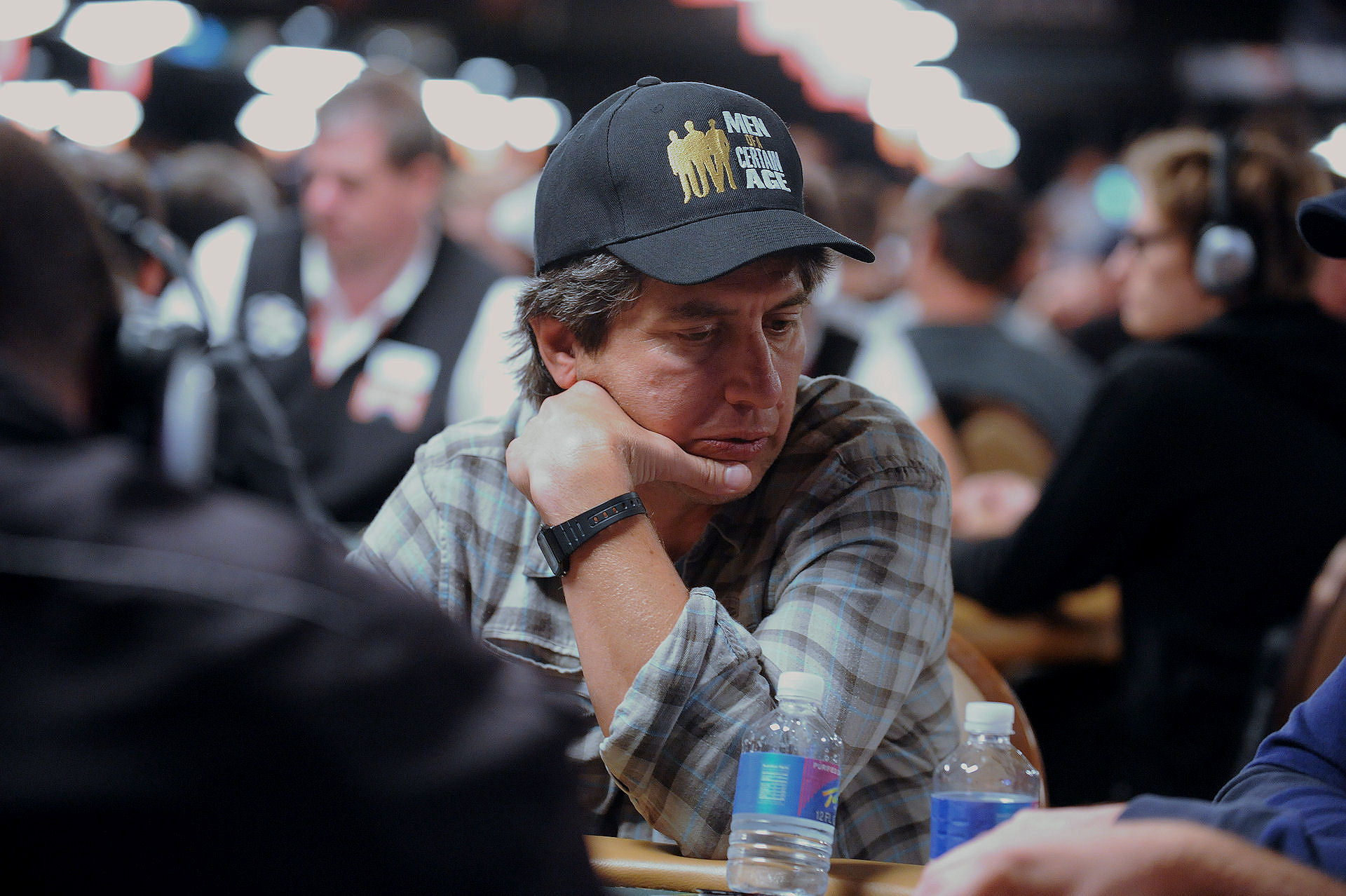
Ray Romano at the main event

The Main Event was a draw for many celebrities to play including:

- Day 1A: Ray Romano, David Alan Grier, Sara Jean Underwood, Petter Northug, René Angélil, Irving Lorenzo
- Day 1B: Orel Hershiser
- Day 1C: Scott Ian, Shanna Moakler, Anthony Rapp, Sully Erna, Gabe Kaplan, Alexia Portal, Shane Warne
- Day 1D: Bruce Buffer, Shannon Elizabeth, Emmitt Smith, Audley Harrison, Hank Azaria, Jason Alexander, Trishelle Cannatella, Sam Simon, Jeff Fenech

Of these celebrities, Northug (653rd), Fenech (585th), and Buffer (478th) made the money.

=== Performance of past champions ===
Name	Championship Year(s)	Day of Elimination
Doyle Brunson	1976 & 1977	2B
Bobby Baldwin	1978	2A
Tom McEvoy	1983	2A
Berry Johnston	1986	2A
Johnny Chan	1987 & 1988	6 (156th)
Phil Hellmuth	1989	1C
Jim Bechtel	1993	3
Dan Harrington	1995	4
Huck Seed	1996	1C
Scotty Nguyen	1998	5 (209th)
Chris Ferguson	2000	2B
Carlos Mortensen	2001	2A
Robert Varkonyi	2002	4
Chris Moneymaker	2003	3
Greg Raymer	2004	1A
Joe Hachem	2005	1D
Jamie Gold	2006	1B
Jerry Yang	2007	1C
Joe Cada	2009	3

=== Other notable high finishes ===
NB: This list is restricted to top 100 finishers with an existing Wikipedia entry.

Place	Name	Prize
14th	Hasan Habib	$500,165
17th	David Baker	$396,967
18th	Scott Clements	$396,967
22nd	William Thorson	$317,161
24th	Ronnie Bardah	$317,161
27th	Johnny Lodden	$317,161
28th	Bryn Kenney	$317,161
30th	Theo Jørgensen	$255,242
50th	Tony Dunst	$168,556
58th	David Benyamine	$138,285
78th	Jean-Robert Bellande	$94,942
86th	Juha Helppi	$79,806
100th	Christian Harder	$57,102

=== November Nine ===
Name	Number of chips (percentage of total)	WSOP Bracelets	WSOP Cashes*	WSOP Earnings*
(Canada) Jonathan Duhamel	65,975,000 (30.0%)	0	2	$43,000
(United States) John Dolan	46,250,000 (21.1%)	0	5	$105,340
(United States) Joseph Cheong	23,525,000 (10.7%)	0	2	$31,064
(United States) John Racener	19,050,000 (8.7%)	0	10	$157,528
(Canada) Matthew Jarvis	16,700,000 (7.6%)	0	0	0
(Italy) Filippo Candio	16,400,000 (7.5%)	0	1	$3,460
(United States) Michael Mizrachi	14,450,000 (6.6%)	1	23	$2,271,327
(United States) Soi Nguyen	9,650,000 (4.4%)	0	0	0
(United States) Jason Senti	7,625,000 (3.5%)	0	1	$17,987

*Career statistics prior to the beginning of the 2010 Main Event.

=== Final Table ===
Place	Name	Prize
1st	Jonathan Duhamel	$8,944,310
2nd	John Racener	$5,545,955
3rd	Joseph Cheong	$4,130,049
4th	Filippo Candio	$3,092,545
5th	Michael Mizrachi	$2,332,992
6th	John Dolan	$1,772,959
7th	Jason Senti	$1,356,720
8th	Matthew Jarvis	$1,045,743
9th	Soi Nguyen	$811,823

== Bracelet ==
American jewelry designer Steve Soffa was chosen by the World Series of Poker to design and manufacture the entire set of bracelets for the 2010 World Series of Poker.
