= Chris Bell (poker player) =

American poker player (born 1971)

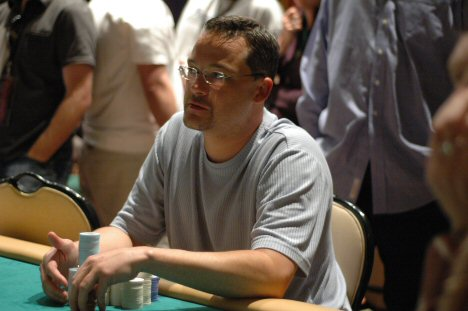
- Bell playing in the WPT 2005 Mirage Poker Showdown.
- Born: July 26, 1971 (age 55); St. Pauls, North Carolina, U.S.

World Series of Poker
- Bracelet: 1
- Final tables: 4
- Money finishes: 14
- Highest WSOP Main Event finish: None

World Poker Tour
- Title: None
- Final tables: 3
- Money finishes: 13

Christopher Bell (born July 26, 1971, in St. Pauls, North Carolina) is an American professional poker player from Raleigh, North Carolina who won the 2010 World Series of Poker $5,000 Pot Limit Omaha Hi-Low Split-8 or Better event. He has also made three final tables at the World Poker Tour (WPT).

== World Series of Poker ==
Bell's accolades at the World Series of Poker (WSOP) which includes four final tables with one bracelet. He won his bracelet at the 2010 World Series of Poker in the $5,000 Pot Limit Omaha Hi-Low Split-8 or Better event, earning $327,040 after defeating professional poker player Dan Shak during heads-up play, other professionals at the final table included English professional Dave "Devilfish" Ulliott (3rd), Eight time bracelet winner and 1988 World Series of Poker Main Event runner-up Erik Seidel (5th), Dutch Pro Rob Hollink (7th), and three time bracelet winner and 1981 World Series of Poker Main Event runner-up Perry Green (8th). Bell almost won a bracelet two years earlier at the 2008 World Series of Poker in the $2,000 Pot-Limit Hold'em event where he finished second to Davidi Kitai, earning $155,806, that same year he also made the final table in the $10,000 World Championship Pot-Limit Hold'em event and finished in 6th place for $157,168. Bell's first WSOP Final table cash was at the 2007 World Series of Poker in the $2,500 Omaha/Seven-Card Stud Hi-Low-8 or Better event which he finished in fifth place for $39,109.

In December 2010, Bell won a WSOP Circuit event at the $10,000 No Limit Hold'em Regional Championship in Atlantic City for $358,295.

=== World Series of Poker bracelets ===
Year	Event	Prize Money
2010	$5,000 Pot Limit Omaha Hi-Low Split-8 or Better	$327,040

== World Poker Tour ==
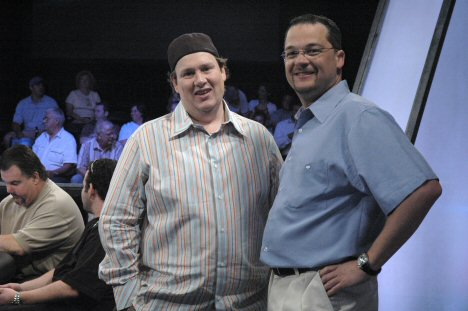
Gavin Smith and Bell at the WPT 2005 Mirage Poker Showdown.

Bell's accolades at the World Poker Tour (WPT), include three (Six-Handed) WPT final tables, third at the WPT 2005 Mirage Poker Showdown to winner Gavin Smith and runner-up Ted Forrest. His second WPT final table was at the WPT 2006 Borgata Poker Open finishing fifth for $314,280 and the third was at the WPT Hollywood Poker Open, finishing in fourth for $124,966. He came close to another final table when he finished in ninth place at the 2003 Borgata Poker Open.

As of 2023, Bell's total live tournament winnings exceed $3,200,000.
