= David Bakes Baker =

American poker player (born 1986)

- Nicknames: Bakes; WhooooKidd; Bussa Buss
- Born: October 17, 1986 (age 40); Charlotte, North Carolina, U.S.

World Series of Poker
- Bracelets: 3
- Final tables: 8
- Money finishes: 31
- Highest WSOP Main Event finish: 252nd, 2008

World Poker Tour
- Title: none
- Final table: none
- Money finishes: 5

European Poker Tour
- Title: none
- Final table: none
- Money finish: 1

David Bakes Baker (born October 17, 1986) is an American professional poker player who has won a World Series of Poker bracelet and appeared at four World Series of Poker final tables. He also has a Spring Championship of Online Poker (SCOOP) championship. Baker currently has over US$2 million in tournament winnings. In order to avoid confusion with David "ODB" Baker, he is listed in the World Series of Poker (WSOP) database by the name "David Bakes Baker" and listed at Bluff Magazine as "David (Bakes) Baker". Baker, who is from Bloomfield Hills, Michigan, attended Michigan State University before taking up poker.

== Career ==
Hailing from Bloomfield Hills, Michigan, Baker began playing poker in high school. During his freshman year at Michigan State, he played small-stakes games with future WSOP bracelet winners Justin Scott and Dean Hamrick. He spent two years at Michigan State. After getting distracted from classwork by poker, he began to play online and moved to Miami to enroll at the School of Audio Engineering. He first visited Las Vegas at age twenty and studied poker under Vanessa Selbst, eventually becoming a boarder at her house. After turning 21, he was staked to play high stakes at Foxwood Casino by Shaun Deeb, Thayer Rasmussen, Vivek Rajkumar, Ray Coburn, Jonathan Aguiar, Adam Shuman and others, known as Team Waffle Crush. Later, he moved to backing by Tom Dwan

He played mostly no limit hold 'em between 2006 and 2010 as he built up his online poker resume. As of July 13, 2011, his largest online prize was his 2009 Spring Championship of Online Poker where his first-place finish in the 190-player $5,000+$200 pot limit omaha event 19-H earned a prize of $215,000. Prior to the 2010 World Series of Poker, he began playing mixed poker games, which have much smaller fields at the WSOP. This led to two final tables in the 2010 WSOP.

At the 2012 World Series of Poker, Baker won his second bracelet and $451,779 in the $10,000 H.O.R.S.E. event that featured a star-studded final table of notable poker professionals that included runner-up John Monnette, Phil Hellmuth (4th), Phil Ivey (5th), Abe Mosseri (6th), Matt Waxman (7th) and Dan Kelly (8th).

At the 2021 World Series of Poker, Baker won his third bracelet and $87,837 in the $1,500 Limit 2-7 Lowball Triple Draw event. Baker faced tough competition, including notable players Peter Lynn, Brian Yoon and Frankie O'Dell.

As of 2023, Baker has won more than $4,050,000 playing live poker tournaments.

== Baker confusion ==
"Bakes" Baker has cashed regularly at the WSOP since the 2008 World Series of Poker. "ODB" Baker first cashed at the 2004 World Series of Poker and has cashed regularly since the 2006 World Series of Poker. Both David Bakers have had multiple in the money finishes in each WSOP since 2008 with at least 4 in each year since 2009. As of 12 July 2011, the two David Bakers have twice cashed in the same WSOP event. At the 3042-player $1,000 2010 No-Limit Hold’em Event 13 ODB placed 3rd for a prize of $206,813, while Bakes placed 59th for a prize of $6,132. At the 817-player $5,000 2011 Triple Chance No-Limit Hold’em Event 50 Bakes placed 32nd for a prize of $21,311, while ODB placed 39th for a prize of $17,817.

Additionally, both David "ODB" Baker and David "Bakes" Baker won World Series of Poker bracelets three days apart at the 2012 World Series of Poker. ODB won $2,500 477-entrant Event #37: Eight Game Mix, while Bakes won $10,000 178-entrant Event #32: H.O.R.S.E.

== World Series of Poker ==
World Series of Poker results
Year	Cashes	Final Tables	Bracelets
2008	2		
2009	4		
2010	4	2	1
2011	4	1	
2012	4	1	1
2013	8	4	
2014	3		
2015	2		
2017	2	1	
2018	6	1	
2019	8	3	
2021	4	1	1
2022	5		
2023	13	1	
2024	5		

World Series of Poker bracelets
Year	Tournament	Prize (US$)
2010	$10,000 No-Limit 2-7 Lowball	$294,321
2012	$10,000 H.O.R.S.E.	$451,779
2021	$1,500 Limit 2-7 Lowball Triple Draw	$87,837

At the 2010 World Series of Poker, Baker had four in the money finishes, including two prizes over $200,000 and a WSOP bracelet. The bracelet for his 1st-place finish at the 101-player $10,000 2010 2-7 Draw Lowball World Championship (No-Limit) Event 19 for a prize of US$294,321. followed a final table with a 6th-place finish at the 116-player $50,000 2010 The Poker Players Championship Event 2 for a prize of US$272,275, giving him two quarter million dollar prize final table finishes for the series. Of the 2010 bracelet winners, he had the highest 2011 finish in defense of his title (6th).
