= Matt Keikoan =

American poker player

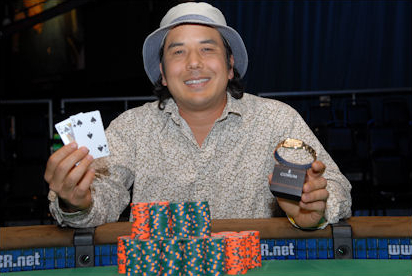
- Keikoan after winning the $2,000 No Limit Hold'em at the 2008 World Series of Poker

World Series of Poker
- Bracelets: 2
- Money finishes: 13
- Highest WSOP Main Event finish: 63rd, 2007

World Poker Tour
- Title: None
- Final table: 1
- Money finishes: 7

Matt Keikoan is an American professional poker player who has won two World Series of Poker bracelets; his first was in the 2008 World Series of Poker $2,000 No-Limit Hold'em event and his second was in the 2010 World Series of Poker $10,000 Limit Hold'em Championship.

== World Series of Poker ==
Keikoan has 12 cashes at the World Series of Poker (WSOP) including coming in 63rd place at the 2007 World Series of Poker Main Event. On June 6, 2008, Keikoan won his first World Series of Poker bracelet after defeating Shannon Shorr at the $2,000 No Limit Holdem event.

Two years later, on June 18, 2010 at the 2010 World Series of Poker in the $10,000 Limit Hold'em Championship event, Keikoan began heads-ups play with Daniel Idema who had almost a 3-1 chip advantage against him. He battled back to take the chip lead several times during the more than four-hour heads-up match and at one time he was severely crippled down to only 300,000 in chips while the blinds were at 120,000/240,000. At that point Keikoan jokingly told his supporters in the audience that he was going to make “(the) greatest comeback in history right here.” and indeed did finish the come back to win his second bracelet and earning himself $425,969.

=== World Series of Poker bracelets ===
Year	Event	Prize Money
2008	$2,000 No-Limit Hold'em	$550,601
2010	$10,000 Limit Hold'em Championship	$425,969

== World Poker Tour ==
Keikoan has seven cashes on the World Poker Tour (WPT). At the WPT Season VII, Keikoan nearly made the WPT final table at the 2008 Legends of Poker, finishing in 7th place, earning $140,830. He made his first WPT final table finishing 5th at WPT Season VIII Bay 101 Shooting Star.

As of 2010, his total live tournament winnings exceed $1,800,000. His 12 cashes at the WSOP account for $1,290,876 of those winnings.
