= Carter Phillips =

American poker player (born 1988)

- Nickname: bdybldngpkr
- Born: October 1988 (age 38); Richmond, Virginia

World Series of Poker
- Bracelets: 2
- Money finishes: 5
- Highest WSOP Main Event finish: 483rd, 2010

European Poker Tour
- Title: 1
- Final table: 1
- Money finishes: 2

William Carter Phillips (born October 1988 in Richmond, Virginia) is a professional poker player from Charlotte, North Carolina who won the 2010 World Series of Poker $1,500 No Limit Hold'em Six Handed event earning $482,774 and is the winner of the European Poker Tour Season 6 Barcelona Main Event earning €850,000 ($1,216,023).

As of 2012, his total live tournament winnings exceed $2,600,000.

== World Series of Poker bracelets ==
| Year | Tournament | Prize |
|---|---|---|
| 2010 | $1,500 No Limit Hold'em Six Handed | $482,774 |
| 2012 | $1,500 No Limit Hold'em | $664,130 |
