= James Dempsey (poker player) =

English poker player

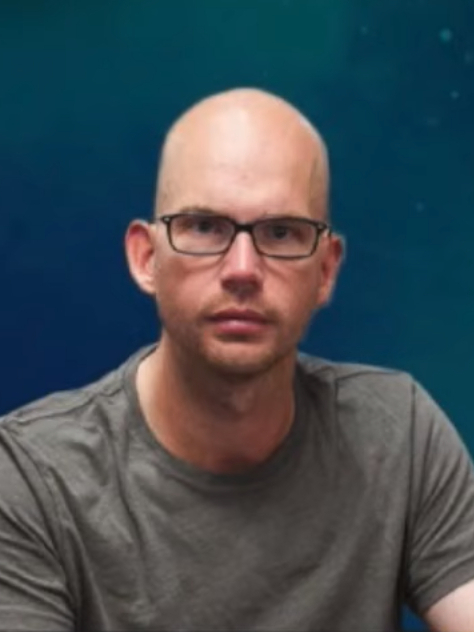
- Dempsey at the 2017 World Series of Poker
- Nicknames: Flushy, Dr. Demps (The Norse Horse/MKKMOO)

World Series of Poker
- Bracelet: 1
- Final tables: 2
- Money finishes: 4

World Poker Tour
- Title: 1
- Final table: 1
- Money finish: 1

European Poker Tour
- Title: None
- Final table: None
- Money finish: 1

James Dempsey, known online as Flushy, is an English professional poker player from Brighton, England, who won a World Series of Poker bracelet at the 2010 World Series of Poker in the $1,500 Pot Limit Hold'em event and a World Poker Tour title at the 2011 Doyle Brunson World Poker Classic.

Dempsey's other activities include playing recreational golf and semi-professional bocce

== World Series of Poker ==
At the 2010 World Series of Poker (WSOP), after winning his first bracelet in the 1,500 Pot Limit Hold'em event and earning $197,470, he made a smaller cash of $10,497 coming 69th in the $5,000 No Limit Hold'em event but then at the $10,000 Omaha Hi-Low Split-8 or Better Championship, he finished runner-up to Sammy Farha, while earning his biggest cash to date of $301,789. At the 2013 World Series of Poker Europe (WSOPE), he had two cashes.

=== World Series of Poker bracelets ===
Year	Event	Prize Money
2010	$1,500 Pot Limit Hold'em	$197,470

== World Poker Tour ==
In December 2011, Dempsey won the Doyle Brunson World Poker Classic, beating a field of 413 players and a final table that included Antonio Esfandiari (6th place), Vanessa Selbst (3rd place), and Soi Nguyen (2nd place.) Dempsey earned $821,612 for his win.

As of 2019, his total live tournament winnings exceed $2,100,000.
