= Gavin Smith (poker player) =

Canadian poker player (1968–2019)

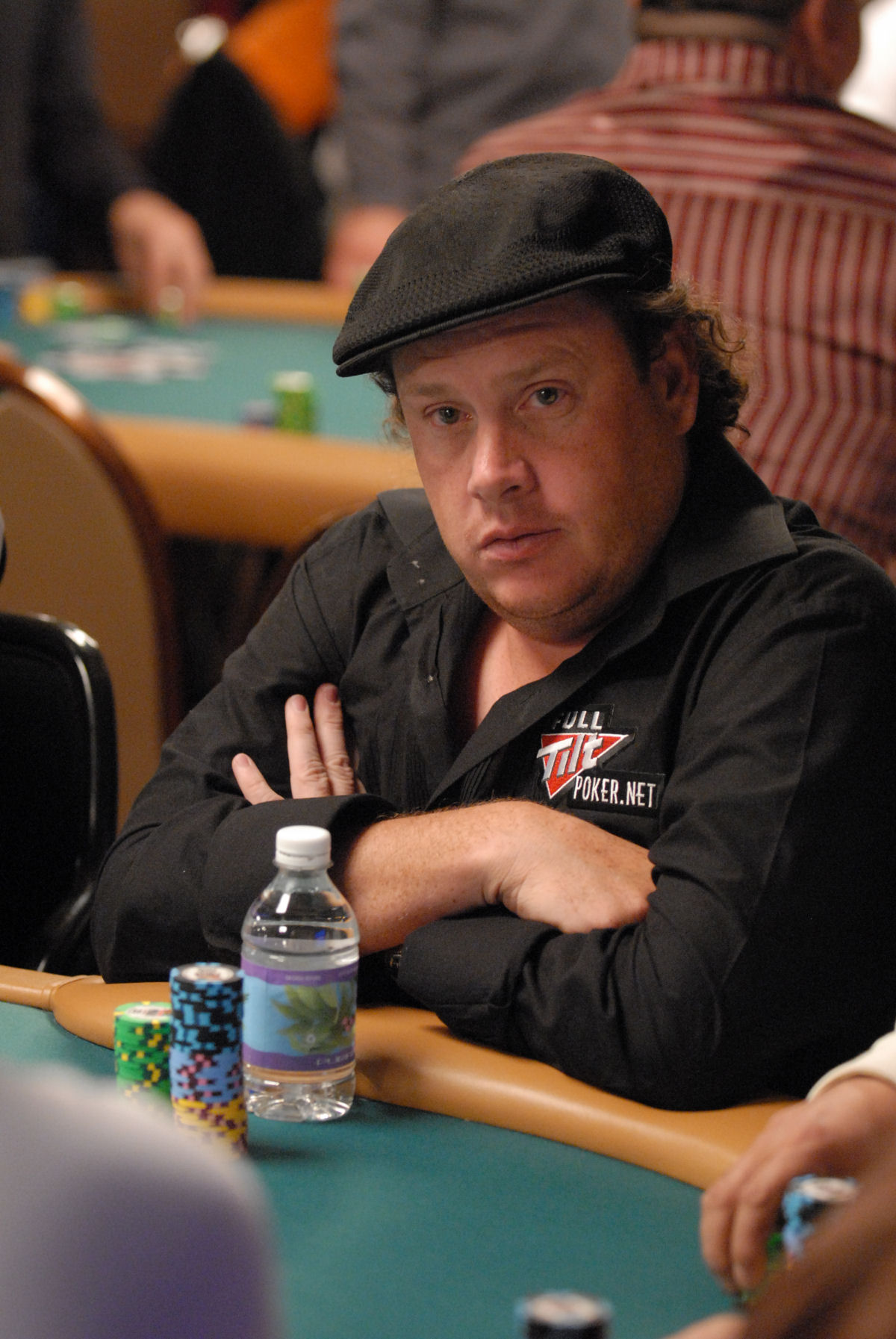
- Smith at the 2007 World Series of Poker
- Nicknames: Birdguts, Caveman
- Born: September 4, 1968; Guelph, Ontario, Canada
- Died: January 14, 2019 (aged 50); Houston, Texas, U.S.

World Series of Poker
- Bracelet: 1
- Final tables: 2
- Money finishes: 18
- Highest WSOP Main Event finish: 52nd, 2004

World Poker Tour
- Title: 1
- Final tables: 4
- Money finishes: 10

Gavin Smith (September 4, 1968 – January 14, 2019) was a Canadian professional poker player who won the World Poker Tour's Season IV Mirage Poker Showdown Championship event and the WPT Season IV Player of the Year award in 2005, then at the 2010 World Series of Poker, won the $2,500 Mixed Hold 'em event along with his first bracelet.

Smith learned how to play cards by playing cribbage and rummy with his father. He started playing poker at the age of 26, playing mixed games with co-workers. Smith became a poker dealer in 1996 and set up his own poker club in 1998 in Kitchener, Ontario. Before that, he worked as a taxicab driver and on a golf course in Guelph, Ontario.

== Poker career ==
Smith first came to note by winning tournaments in no limit Texas hold 'em and seven card stud in the 1999 and 2000 World Poker Finals at Foxwoods.

=== World Poker Tour ===
In May 2005, he won the first prize of $1,128,278 in the World Poker Tour (WPT) Mirage Poker Showdown in Las Vegas, defeating Ted Forrest in the final heads-up confrontation. In October 2005 he made the WPT final table again in the 2nd Annual Doyle Brunson North American Poker Championship, where he finished third, behind Minh Ly and Dan Harrington. He made a third WPT final table in January 2006, finishing fourth. The three WPT final tables earned him the World Poker Tour Player of the Year award for Season 4.

=== World Series of Poker ===
Smith first cashed in the World Series of Poker (WSOP) in 2003 and would later cash in the $10,000 no limit hold'em main event in 2004, finishing 52nd. He went on to cash in 2005 also (471st), as well as in 2007 (592nd).

Smith boasted several other high finishes, including a runner-up finish in 2007 ($1,500 Pot-Limit Hold 'Em for $155,645). The experience Smith gained in mixed-games when he started playing also served him well, as he had several high finishes in H.O.R.S.E. tournaments.

Smith earned his first World Series of Poker bracelet in the $2,500 Mixed Hold'em (Limit/No Limit) event at the 2010 World Series of Poker, defeating Danny Hannawa heads-up, and earning $268,238 for his first-place finish.

=== World Series of Poker bracelets ===
Year	Tournament	Prize (US$)
2010	$2,500 Mixed Hold'em (Limit/No-Limit)	$268,238

=== World Series of Poker Circuit events ===
In May 2006, Smith finished runner-up in the World Series of Poker circuit event at Harrah's New Orleans, winning $293,930.

=== Other poker related activities ===
Smith won the Big August Rec.Gambling Excursion (BARGE) Main Event in 2004, besting a field of 249 poker enthusiasts, in Las Vegas, Nevada.

In July 2006, Smith won the World Pro-Am Challenge event at the Poker Dome Challenge, taking home the $500,000 first prize.

From April 2006 until October 2006, Gavin was one of the hosts of The Circuit radio show sponsored by Card Player magazine. Beginning in 2007, Smith and Joe Sebok co-hosted PokerRoad Radio with Joe Stapleton. Smith's final episode as a co-host on PokerRoad Radio was July 12, 2010.

He won Poker After Dark´s Season 3 Week 2 "19th Hole", defeating Phil Ivey in heads-up play. It was his first time on the show.

Smith's lifetime live tournament winnings exceeded $6,321,000. His 47 cashes as the WSOP accounted for $1,673,208 of those winnings.

== Prop bets ==
Smith co-starred with Joe Sebok on a show called "Prop Bets" on the Internet-TV site RawVegas.tv, mainly due to the above-mentioned prop bet at the 2006 World Series of Poker.

Smith won a bet with Sebok on who would win the most Card Player magazine points at the 2006 World Series of Poker. As a consequence, Sebok had to wear a bear outfit on Day 1B, among other funny-looking outfits, including Wonder Woman.

Smith had a tattoo on his upper right shoulder of a four-leaf clover and the initials J.S. He had to get the tattoo after losing a prop bet to Sebok.

== Death ==
Smith died on January 14, 2019, at his home in Houston, Texas, at the age of 50. He died in his sleep.

As a tribute, the Gavin Smith Memorial Poker Tournament was held at the Rio Hotel & Casino in Las Vegas, as the first event of the 2019 World Series of Poker.
