= Luis Velador =

Mexican-American poker player

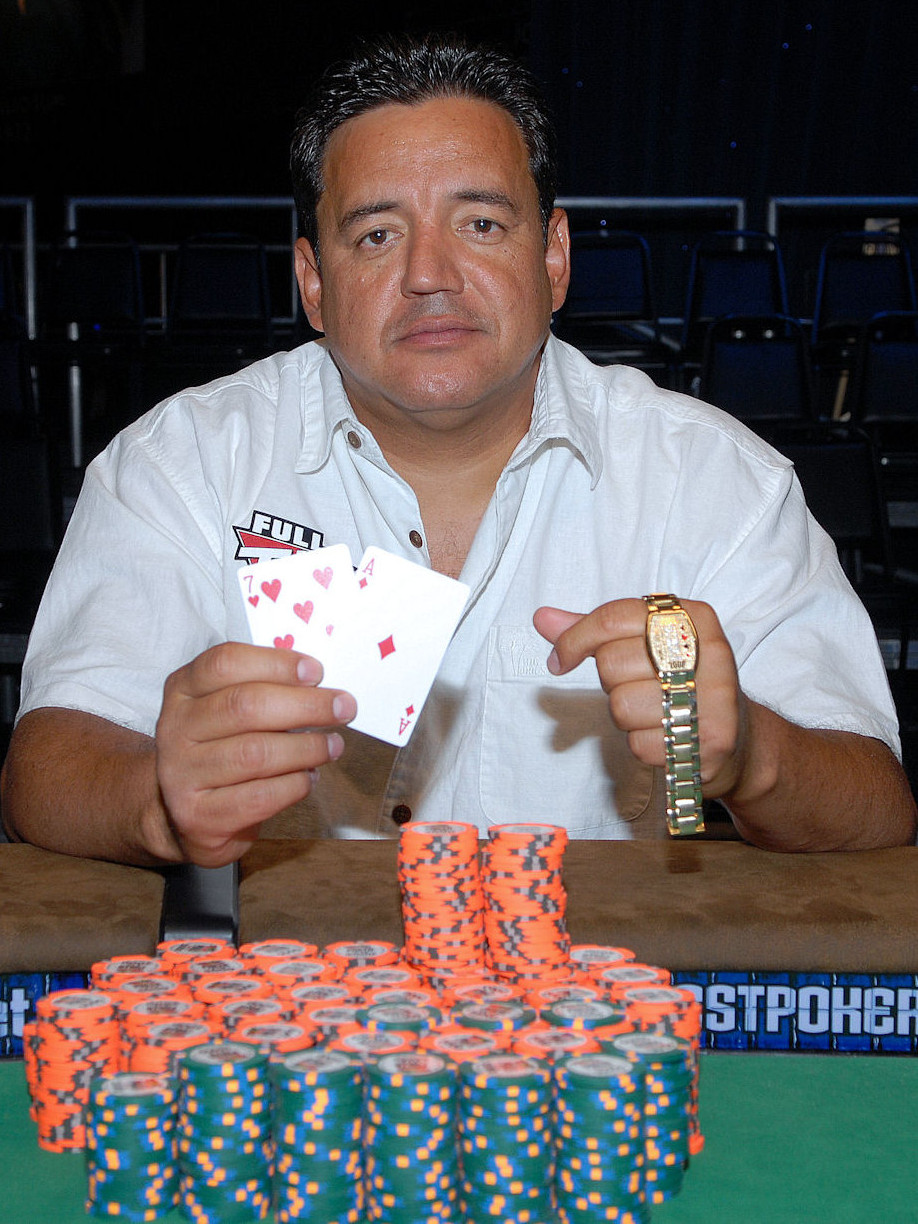
- Velador after winning at the 2008 World Series of Poker
- Born: Jalisco, Mexico

World Series of Poker
- Bracelets: 2
- Final tables: 3
- Money finishes: 24
- Highest WSOP Main Event finish: 10th, 2014

World Poker Tour
- Title: None
- Final table: None
- Money finishes: 5

José-Luis Velador (born in Jalisco, Mexico) is a Mexican-American professional poker player from Corona, California, who is a two-time World Series of Poker bracelet winner. He won his first bracelet at the 2008 World Series of Poker beating Chris Signore in the $1,500 No-Limit Hold'em event. Two years later at the 2010 World Series of Poker, he won his second bracelet after defeating David Chiu heads-up in the $2,500 Pot Limit Hold'em/Omaha event.

As of 2018, his total live tournament winnings exceed $2,150,000.

== World Series of Poker bracelets ==
Year	Event	Prize Money
2008	$1,500 No-Limit Hold'em	$574,734
2010	$2,500 Pot Limit Hold'em/Omaha	$260,552
