= Dan Kelly (poker player) =

American poker player (born 1989)

- Nicknames: djk123 (PokerStars) imabigkidnow (Full Tilt Poker)
- Born: March 10, 1989 (age 37); Fairfax, Virginia, U.S.

World Series of Poker
- Bracelets: 2
- Final tables: 6
- Money finishes: 27
- Highest WSOP Main Event finish: None

World Poker Tour
- Title: None
- Final table: 1
- Money finishes: 2

Daniel J. Kelly (born March 10, 1989, in Fairfax, Virginia) is an American professional poker player from Potomac, Maryland, who won his first bracelet at the 2010 World Series of Poker in the $25,000 No Limit Hold'em Six Handed event, earning $1,315,518. his second came at the 2014 WSOP in the $1,500 Limit Hold'em event.

Kelly graduated from Villanova University in 2011 with a degree in mechanical engineering. He was also a sponsored professional poker player as one of Doyle's 10 at the online card-room Doyles Room.

== World Series of Poker ==
At the 2010 World Series of Poker, Kelly won his first WSOP bracelet in the $25,000 No Limit Hold'em Six Handed event, collecting $1,315,518 in prizemoney. He defeated Shawn Buchanan in a heads up battle after surviving a final table which included Frank Kassela (3rd), Jason Somerville (4th), Mikael Thuritz (5th) and Eugene Katchalov (6th). Kelly also has three other cashes at the 2010 World Series of Poker in the first year he was of legal age to play. Dan Kelly finished in fourth place in the 2013 Millionaire Maker at the World Series of Poker for $325,000.

=== World Series of Poker bracelets ===
Year	Event	Prize Money
2010	$25,000 No Limit Hold'em Six Handed	$1,315,518
2014	$1,500 Limit Hold'em	$195,167

== World Poker Tour ==
Dan made his first ever WPT money finish in the WPT Spanish Championship in 2008, finishing in 24th place and earned himself €7,580. His made the final table in his second WPT cash at the L.A. Poker Classic in 2011, finishing 3rd place for $521,770.

As of 2014, his total live tournament winnings exceed $3,100,000.

== Online poker ==
In a July 2010 article by Andrew Feldman of ESPN, wrote "Dan "djk123" Kelly had been one of the more-hyped rookies heading into the WSOP, and his performance in this event simply proved all the critics right."

In an interview in Bluff Magazine by Ryan Nelson, the World Series of Poker Europe Main Event winner Annette "Annette_15" Obrestad was asked who she would least like to have position on her, she mention four players, Sorel "Imper1um" Mizzi, Chad "lilholdem954" Batista, Isaac "westmenloAA" Baron and Dan "djk123" Kelly, she said of Kelly in particular "djk123 always owns me!"

In an article in ESPN poker about 2010 World Series of Poker where Kelly won he first bracelet, Gary Wise wrote "Jason Somerville described him prior to the final table as "One of the greatest tournament players in history," a sentiment that seems to be shared by many in the online community."

- Some of Kelly's online poker tournament achievements include:

In the PokerStars $215 Sunday Warm-Up, an online poker tournament that began on March 28, 2010, Kelly finished second for $109,300.30

In June 2009, he placed second in the PokerStars' $530 "Sunday 500" tournament, earning $68,900.

=== World Championship of Online Poker ===
Kelly known on PokerStars by the screen name "djk123" has played several events at the World Championship of Online Poker (WCOOP), He cashed a total of 11 times in the 2009 WCOOP alone while winning two titles that year, one in the $215 Razz event earning $53,410.01 and the other in the $10,300 H.O.R.S.E. event, earning $252,350. Also in 2009 he made the final table at the $5,200 No Limit Hold'em Main Event along with the eventual winner Yevgeniy "Jovial Gent" Timoshenko, Kelly finished in fourth for $643,200 and due to his overall achievements, he won the 2009 WCOOP Player of the Year award.

At the 2011 WCOOP Kelly playing out of the country of Malta won his third WCOOP title in Event 37, the $109 8-Game for $23,529. This was the first WCOOP held by PokerStars after the events of Black Friday 2011.

At the 2012 WCOOP Kelly playing out of the country of Costa Rica won a record fourth WCOOP title in Event 36: $215 No-Limit Hold'em w/Rebuys for $138,355.

World Championship of Online Poker Titles
Year	Event	Tournament	Prize (US$)
2009	Event #2	$215 Razz	$53,410.01
2009	Event #44	$10,300 HORSE	$252,350.00
2011	Event #37	$109 8-Game [10-minute Levels]	$23,529.00
2012	Event #36	$215 No-Limit Hold'em w/Rebuys	$138,355.00

=== Full Tilt Online Poker Series ===
Kelly is known on Full Tilt Poker as "imabigkidnow", and on the site he won a Full Tilt Online Poker Series title in the FTOPS X Event #14 $216 No Limit Hold ‘em Turbo, earning $104,869.80. In the next series in the FTOPS XI Event #17 No Limit Hold'em 6-max with Rebuy, he came in third, earning $116,661.60.
