= Hoai Pham =

Vietnamese-American poker player (born 1967)

- Born: November 1967 (age 58–59); Vietnam

World Series of Poker
- Bracelet: 1
- Money finishes: 2
- Highest WSOP Main Event finish: 212th, 2011

Hoai Pham (Vietnamese: Hoài Phạm; born November 1967) is a Vietnamese-born American dealer at the Village Club Casino, in Chula Vista, California who won the first event of the 2010 World Series of Poker---the $500 Casino Employee Championship. Pham plays poker primarily online and prefers the games of seven-card stud and pot-limit Omaha.

== World Series of Poker bracelets ==
Pham won $71,424 at the 2010 World Series of Poker.

Year	Tournament	Prize (US$)
2010	$500 Casino Employees No Limit Hold'em	$71,424
