= David Benyamine =

French poker player (born 1972)

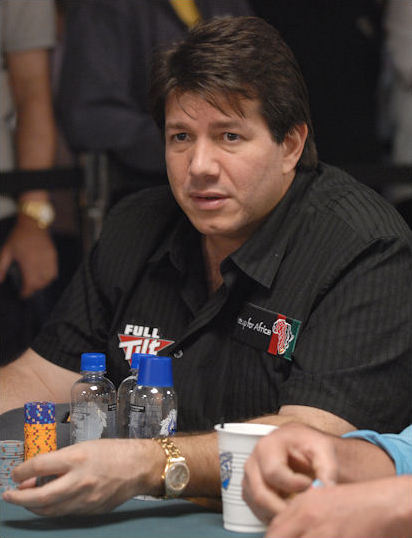
- Benyamine at the 2008 World Series of Poker
- Nicknames: Napoleon, Degenyamine
- Born: 5 July 1972 (age 54)

World Series of Poker
- Bracelet: 1
- Money finishes: 10
- Highest WSOP Main Event finish: 58th, 2010

World Poker Tour
- Title: 1
- Final tables: 4
- Money finishes: 11

European Poker Tour
- Title: None
- Final table: 1
- Money finishes: 2

David Benyamine (born 5 July 1972 in Paris, France) is a French professional poker player with a World Poker Tour title. Benyamine was a professional tennis player in his early career but had to retire because of shoulder pain. He was also a successful top ten billiards player in France. He learned poker at the age of 12 and plays high-stakes cash games on a regular basis. Benyamine is a Pot-Limit Omaha specialist.

== Poker career ==
Benyamine first started playing poker in a professional setting at the Aviation Club de France.

He is a regular in the world's most famous high stakes cash room at the Bellagio, Bobby's Room (now renamed Legend's Room).

=== World Poker Tour ===
Benyamine has made four final tables in World Poker Tour (WPT) open events: the 2003 Grand Prix de Paris (second season) – 1st place (€357,200); the 2004 L.A. Poker Classic (second season) – 6th place ($132,355); the 2008 Bellagio Cup IV (seventh season) – 2nd place ($840,295) and the 2010 WPT Championship (eighth season) – 4th place ($329,228). He won the Premier League of Poker IV. He is also the winner of the WPT Battle of Champions II invitational event, where he defeated a final table including fellow professionals Hoyt Corkins, Mel Judah, Antonio Esfandiari, and Phil Laak.

=== World Series of Poker ===
Benyamine is primarily a cash game player, but due to comments from his friends, he started playing tournaments more regularly during the 2008 World Series of Poker. He has made four WSOP final tables, three of which were in 2008, which was the same year he won his first bracelet. He finished in 58th place in the 2010 WSOP Main Event.

World Series of Poker bracelet
Year	Tournament	Prize (US$)
2008	$10,000 Omaha Hi-Low Split	$535,687

=== Other poker ventures ===
Benyamine played high-stakes online poker under his own name at Full Tilt Poker until the site was shut down.

=== Poker earnings ===
As of 2020, his total live tournament winnings exceed $7,800,000. His forty cashes at the WSOP account for $2,541,000 of those winnings.

== Personal life ==
Benyamine lives in Henderson, Nevada. He has one daughter, and was formerly engaged to professional poker and blackjack player Erica Schoenberg. The couple have since separated.
