= Marcel Vonk =

Dutch poker player (born 1974)

- Born: 14 January 1974 (age 52); Leiderdorp, Netherlands

World Series of Poker
- Bracelet: 1
- Final tables: 2
- Money finishes: 3

Marcel Louis Vonk (born 14 January 1974) is a poker player and the first Dutch person to win a World Series of Poker (WSOP) bracelet in No Limit Hold'em (NLHE). On 5 July 2010, he beat out 3,843 opponents to capture the gold bracelet in event #54: $1,000 No-Limit Hold'em, taking home $570,960 USD for the victory. He has live tournament winnings exceeding $1,100,000.

== Personal life ==
Marcel Vonk has a Ph.D. in physics from University of Amsterdam, and works as a researcher in string theory at the University of Amsterdam. In 2010 he authored a book on string theory in Dutch.

=== World Series of Poker bracelets ===
Year	Event	Prize Money
2010	$1,000 No Limit Hold'em Event #54	$570,960
