= Richard Ashby =

English poker player (born 1972)

- Nickname: Chufty
- Born: 1972 (age 53–54); London, England

World Series of Poker
- Bracelets: 2
- Final tables: 13
- Money finishes: 43

Richard "Chufty" Ashby (born 1972 in London) is a professional poker player from England. He was given the name 'Chufty' by his friends at University, due to Ashby's frequency of using the term "chuffed".

Ashby picked up poker at his local tennis club, as well as playing for pennies with his father. In the mid nineties, he played his first tournament, a £10 Stud tournament. A few years later, he earned entry into the Aussie Millions. After he bust from the first tournament, he put his entire $4,000 bankroll on the line in a cash game and spun it up to $100,000. By the end of the week, he had lost it all.

Ashby's first recorded win came at the 2001 Grosvenor UK Open in Luton when he won £10,500 in the £100 Pot Limit Seven Card Stud Event. Since then, he's accrued over half a million dollars in live tournament winnings including final table finishes at the 2007 Manchester GUKPT and the 2009 Aussie Millions, the latter of which earned him A$150,000 for his seventh-place finish.

However, Ashby openly admits that he needs to work on his live game, and is much better known as an online player, in particular on Black Belt Poker where was recently acquired as one of their sponsored pros in September 2010. Ashby can often been seeing playing on the site in some of the highest stakes available, and against many of the biggest names in poker.

Ashby's favoured game is Omaha and he is good friends with fellow Omaha specialist Ben Grundy. For a while, they played in the same games but eventually realised that it was a pointless exercise and decided to avoid each other from there on in. In addition to Grundy, Ashby considers France's David Benyamine to be the best Omaha player in Europe, although he cites Phil Ivey as the only player he would consider sitting out against.

In July 2009, Ashby emerged as online poker's biggest cash winner when he earned a total of $1,824,074 over the four-week period. This success garnered him much interest, in particular on the Two Plus Two forums where the nosebleed stakes are avidly followed.

On 13 June 2010 Ashby won the World Series of Poker Event #21, a $1,500 seven card stud event, winning $140,467 in the process. He followed that success less than two weeks later by finishing 2nd in World Series of Poker Event #43, the $10,000 H.O.R.S.E. World Championship, netting him $378,027 in winnings.

On 24 September 2010 Ashby won Event #54 of the World Championship Of Online Poker, the $2,100 Pot Limit Omaha 6-max event. He was successful out of a field of 480 players, collecting his first WCOOP bracelet along with $185,760 in winnings.

Ashby won his second bracelet at the 2024 WSOP in a $1,500 Seven Card Stud event for $113,725.
