= Michael Linn =

American poker player

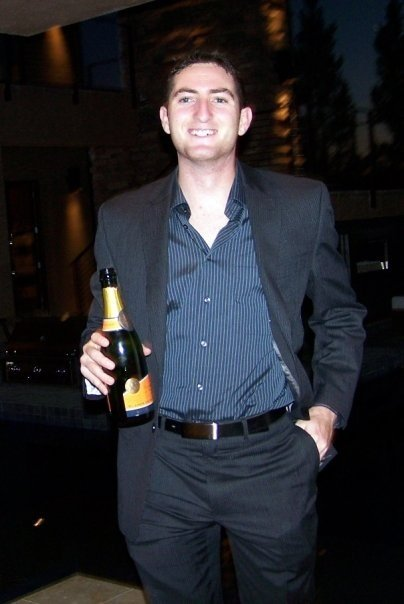
- Born: Michael Jacob Linn; San Diego, California, United States

World Series of Poker
- Bracelet: 1
- Highest WSOP Main Event finish: 49, 2010

Michael Jacob Linn is a professional poker player who won event number 49 at the 2010 World Series of Poker for $609,493.

== Biography ==
Linn was self-taught at no-limit hold'em, however his uncle is bracelet winner Barry Greenstein. He is a student at Cal Poly San Luis Obispo and is from San Diego, California. He grew up in La Jolla, California with his brother Joe Linn, father Dan Linn, and mother Sandie Linn. He currently lives in San Luis Obispo with two other high-stakes poker players, Daniel Ketchum and Daniel Ray.
