= David ODB Baker =

American poker player (born 1972)

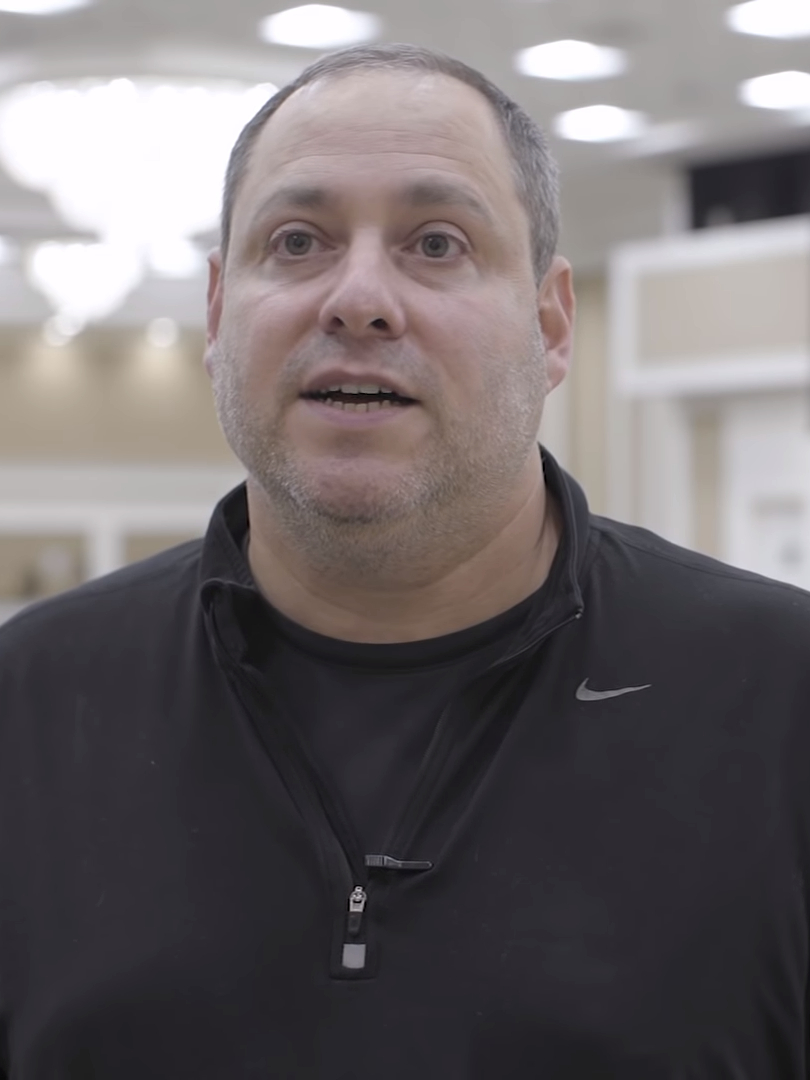
- Baker in 2019
- Nicknames: ODB, Original David Baker, "OG"
- Born: July 14, 1972 (age 54); Connecticut, U.S.

World Series of Poker
- Bracelets: 4
- Final tables: 28
- Money finishes: 162
- Highest WSOP Main Event finish: 17th, 2010

World Poker Tour
- Title: 1
- Final tables: 2
- Money finishes: 17

David ODB Baker (born July 14, 1972) is an American professional poker player living in Sahuarita, Arizona, who has won four World Series of Poker (WSOP) bracelets. Baker currently has over $8.3 million in tournament winnings. Baker is an Auburn University alumnus.

== Career ==
Born in Connecticut, Baker earned a finance degree from Auburn and became a business salesman. As of 2008, he lived with his wife and daughter Kathy in Texas. He had been introduced to poker in college. By the mid 1990s, he was playing pot limit Omaha at casinos in New Orleans and eventually began playing three times a week at underground casinos in Houston. He became a full-time professional poker player in 2004.

== World Series of Poker ==
Baker currently has 156 WSOP in the money finishes. Highlighted by a 17th-place finish in the main event, his 2010 World Series of Poker performance included seven in the money finishes. Baker's success was confusing to those following the WSOP because David "Bakes" Baker also finished in the money four times and won a World Series of Poker bracelet at the 2010 WSOP.

His first World Series of Poker cash was an 18th-place finish at the 237-player $2,500 2004 Limit Hold'em Event 11 for a prize of $4,360. His first WSOP final table was in the 720-player $1,500 2007 Limit Hold'em Shootout Event 53 for a prize of $12,776. As of June 15, 2025, his highest WSOP prize was in the 2025 $5,000 Seniors No-Limit Hold'em event for a prize of $646,845.

In June 2012, Baker won his first World Series of Poker bracelet in the $2,500 Eight Game Mix event, defeating Greg Mueller heads-up to earn $271,312. As of 2025, he has won over $8,600,000 playing live poker tournaments.

World Series of Poker results
Year	Cashes	Final tables	Bracelets
2004	1		
2006	5		
2007	1	1	
2008	2	1	
2009	4		
2010	7	2	
2011	5	1	
2012	8	4	1
2013	3	1	
2014	4	1	
2015	5	2	
2016	6		
2017	10	2	
2018	5	2	
2019	16	2	1
2020			
2021	6	1	
2022	11		
2023	18	4	1
2024	18	2	
2025	14	2	1

World Series of Poker bracelets
Year	Tournament	Prize (US$)
2012	$2,500 Eight Game Mix	$271,312
2019	$1,500 Limit Hold'em	$161,139
2023	$1,500 Razz	$152,991
2025	$5,000 Seniors High-Roller	$646,845

== See also ==
- List of Auburn University people
