= RawVegas.tv =

RawVegas.tv is a defunct video website. RawVegas was first launched on January 19, 2007 and is the first venture for Raw Networks LLC, a Las Vegas-based Internet television studio that creates and produces short form video content exclusively for the Internet. Programming on RawVegas.tv includes a daily mix of content that focuses on Las Vegas, including a daily news show, review shows designed to inform both locals and visitors, regular red carpet interviews, a celebrity gossip beat, a number of comedy programs, wagering shows, a slate of reality series starring Las Vegas personalities and poker players and other programs that display life in Las Vegas.
