= Frank Kassela =

American poker player (born 1968)

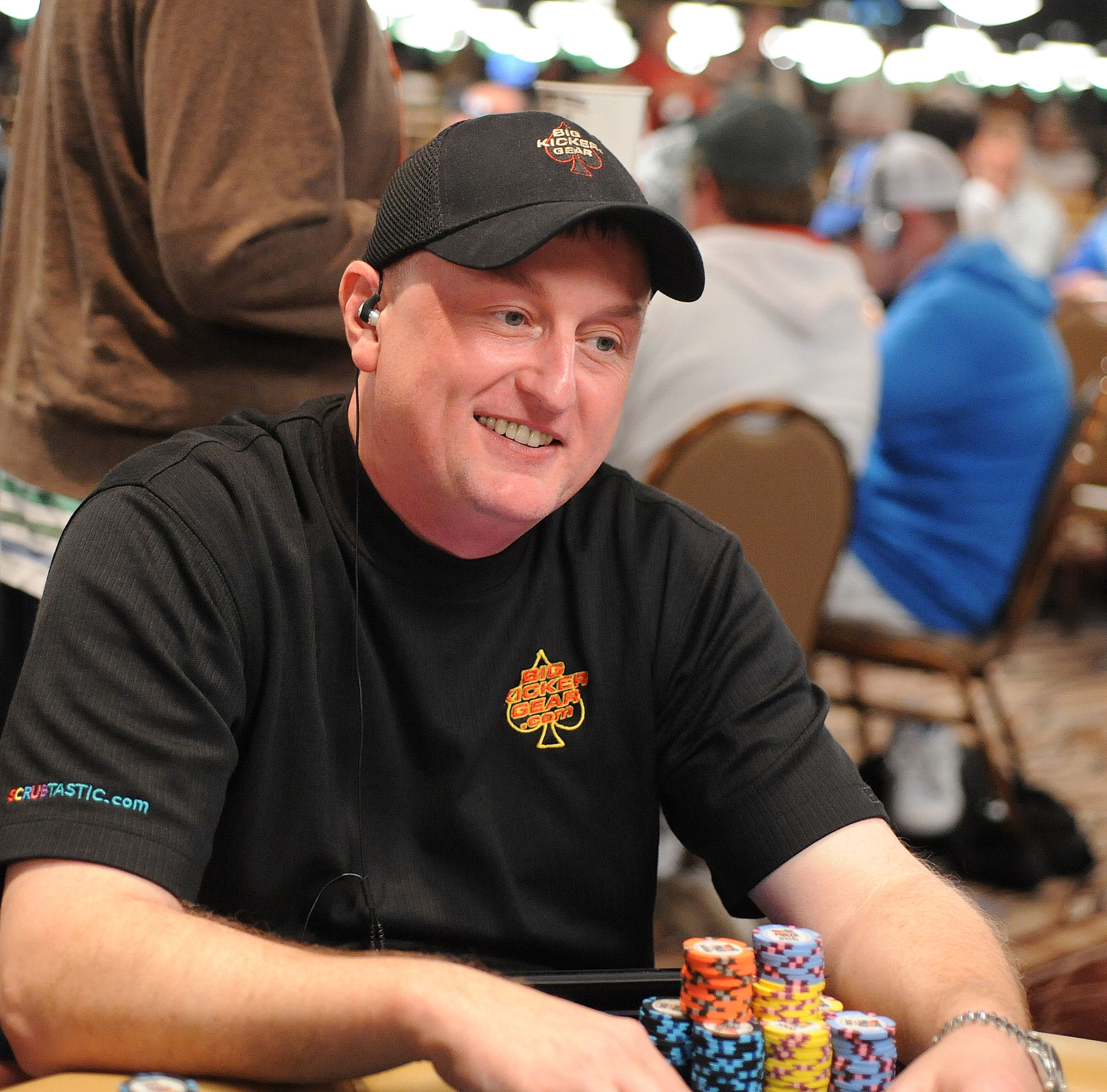
- Kassela at the 2010 World Series of Poker
- Born: February 26, 1968 (age 58); Chicago Heights, Illinois, U.S.
- Occupations: Small business owner, Army Reserve veteran, poker player
- Political party: Democratic
- Website: Official website

Frank Kassela
- Nickname: Lights Out

World Series of Poker
- Bracelets: 3
- Final tables: 10
- Money finishes: 29
- Highest WSOP Main Event finish: 674th, 2010

World Poker Tour
- Title: None
- Final table: None
- Money finishes: 2

Frank R. Kassela (born February 26, 1968) is an American professional poker player from Germantown, Tennessee now residing in Las Vegas, who is a three-time World Series of Poker bracelet winner. He won two bracelets at the 2010 World Series of Poker, first in the $10,000 Seven Card Stud Hi-Low Split-8 or Better Championship event and second in the $2,500 Razz event. and earned the 2010 WSOP Player of the Year Award. He won his third bracelet at the $1,500 No Limit 2-7 Lowball Draw.

== World Series of Poker ==
At the World Series of Poker (WSOP), Kassela has won three bracelets, cashed 26 times, and made ten final tables.

The first time Kassella made a final table was at the 2005 World Series of Poker in the $2,500 Pot Limit Hold'em event which was won by Johnny Chan, finishing fourth and earning $68,425. At the 2010 WSOP, Kassela won the $10,000 Seven Card Stud Hi-Low Split-8 or Better Championship, with its $447,446 first prize, and also the first place prize of $214,085 in the $2,500 Razz event. Additionally in 2010, Kassela finished in third place in the $25,000 No-Limit Hold 'Em Six-Handed event for $556,053 and also cashed in the 2010 WSOP Main Event finishing 674th place, earning him $21,327 after his K♦ K♣ failed to hold up to his opponents' A♠ Q♣.

As of 2017, his total live tournament winnings exceed $3,025,000.

=== World Series of Poker bracelets ===
| Year | Event | Prize Money |
|---|---|---|
| 2010 | $10,000 Seven Card Stud Hi-Low Split-8 or Better Championship | $447,446 |
| 2010 | $2,500 Razz | $214,085 |
| 2017 | $1,500 No Limit 2-7 Lowball Draw | $89,151 |

== 2014 Congressional Run ==
On October 28, 2013, Kassela filed papers with the Federal Election Commission to run for Congress in Nevada's 3rd congressional district. On November 25, 2013, Kassela withdrew his candidacy and endorsed Erin Bilbray.
