= Matt Matros =

American poker player (born 1977)

- Born: May 13, 1977 (age 49)

World Series of Poker
- Bracelets: 3
- Final tables: 6
- Money finishes: 28
- Highest WSOP Main Event finish: 78th, 2008

World Poker Tour
- Title: None
- Final table: 1
- Money finishes: 3

Matthew "Matt" Matros (born May 13, 1977) is a professional poker player and author from Brooklyn, New York, who has won three World Series of Poker events.

Matros holds a Bachelor of Science degree from Yale University and a Master of Fine Arts degree from Sarah Lawrence College. He is the author of the book The Making Of A Poker Player: How An Ivy League Math Geek Learned To Play Championship Poker, and was a poker coach on the now defunct poker site, CardRunners.

== Live poker ==
Matros won his first bracelet at the 2010 World Series of Poker Event 12: $1,500 Limit Hold’em earning $189,870. He has three other WSOP final tables, finishing 9th at the 2005 WSOP $3,000 Limit Hold'em event, 6th at the 2008 WSOP $1,500 No Limit Hold'em event, and 9th at the 2010 $2,000 Limit Hold 'Em event.

He finished in third place behind the runner up Hasan Habib and winner Martin de Knijff in 2004 at the $25,000 World Poker Tour (WPT) Championship, earning him $706,903. Matros finished 22nd at the 2006 (WPT) Pokerstars.com Caribbean Adventure, and just missed the 6 handed Final Table of the WPT 2008 North American Poker Championship, where he finished 7th.

At the 2012 World Series of Poker, Matros won his third WSOP bracelet in the $1,500 No Limit Hold'em Six-Handed event, earning $454,835.

As of 2012, his total live tournament winnings exceed $2,300,000.

=== World Series of Poker bracelets ===
Year	Event	Prize Money
2010	$1,500 Limit Hold'em	$189,870
2011	$2,500 Mixed Hold'em (Limit/No-Limit)	$303,501
2012	$1,500 No Limit Hold'em Six-Handed	$454,835
