= Guillaume Darcourt =

French poker player (born 1973)

Guillaume Darcourt (born in 1973 in Neuilly-sur-Seine) is a French professional poker player. He is nicknamed The Boa.

For eighteen months Loïc Xans followed Guillaume Darcourt to film a low budget documentary in French titled BOA that can be viewed on YouTube. The script was based on some professional circuits.

He is currently sponsored by the ONPOK structure, and previously by the teams Poker770 and PMU.

He won the WPT Bucharest in March 2010 and reached 3rd place in the $3,000 No Limit Hold'em - Triple Chance at the WSOP 2010 in Las Vegas., finished 3rd in the SCOOP Main Event in 2011 organized by the site Pokerstars.com., reached 35th place in the Main Event of the WSOP 2011 in Las Vegas, which had about 6900 players., and won the WPT National Cannes 2013, the same year his partnership with PMU expired. His tournament winnings amount to over $1.5 million.
