= Rob Hollink =

Dutch poker player (born 1962)

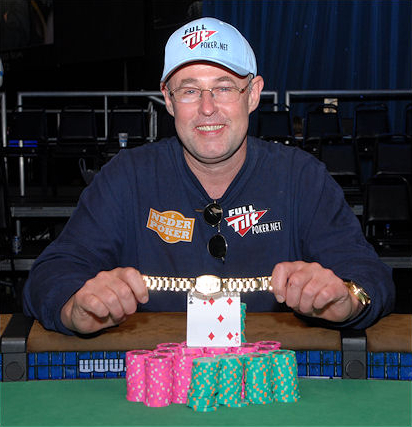
- Hollink after winning the $10,000 Limit Hold'em World Championship at the 2008 WSOP.
- Born: 27 March 1962 (age 64); Enschede, Netherlands

World Series of Poker
- Bracelet: 1
- Money finishes: 24
- Highest WSOP Main Event finish: 193rd, 2004

World Poker Tour
- Title: None
- Final table: 1
- Money finishes: 2

European Poker Tour
- Title: 1
- Final tables: 2
- Money finishes: 4

Rob Hollink (born 27 March 1962 in Enschede, Netherlands) is a professional poker player based in Groningen. He has won both a European Poker Tour (EPT) title and World Series of Poker bracelet, becoming the first person from the Netherlands to do so, first was at the EPT's inaugural Grand Final of the European Poker Tour in Monte Carlo in 2005 and then he won his first bracelet at the 2008 World Series of Poker in the $10,000 Limit Hold'em World Championship, becoming the first Dutch bracelet winner.

== Before poker ==
Prior to playing poker professionally, Hollink played tennis, football (soccer) and basketball when he was a kid, but injuries prevented his career from progressing as far as he wanted. Rob Hollink has been a professional gambler since 1985. After winning a poker-tournament in Paris in 2001, Hollink decided to stop playing black-jack and roulette and proceeded as a poker professional.

== Poker career ==
His numerous Omaha tournament wins include:

- HFl 400 Pot Limit Omaha at the Master Classics of Poker 2001, Amsterdam - HFl 90,763 ($37,187)
- €500 Pot Limit Omaha at the Austrian Masters 2002, Vienna - €25,220 ($23,523)
- €3,000 Pot Limit Omaha at the Euro Finals of Poker 2003, Paris - €122,440 ($131,798)
- €250 Pot Limit Omaha at the World Heads-Up Poker Championship 2004, Barcelona - €23,000 ($27,855)

Holllink made the final table of the Pot Limit Omaha tournament at the 2003 World Series of Poker (WSOP), finishing in eighth place.

On 7 August 2003 the opening event of the 2003 World Championship of Online Poker, a $109 buy-in heads up No Limit tournament, was won by Hollink for a $12,800 first prize, using the screen name 'batoelrob.'

In no limit hold'em events, Rob has finished in the money of two World Poker Tour (WPT) events:

- 12th in the Grand Prix de Paris 2004 - €19,000 ($23,167)
- 5th in the Season 3 WPT Championship - $377,420

One of his greatest wins was defeating the 211 player field at the €10,000 European Poker Tour Grand Final in Monte Carlo, where he took home the €635,000 ($845,190) grand prize.

In 2005, Hollink won 4 tournaments, he won the European tournament performance of the year and was also chosen as European poker player of the year

In June 2008, Rob Hollink won the $10,000 World Championship Limit Hold'em at the World Series of Poker in Las Vegas, earning $496,931.

In 2026, his total live tournament winnings exceed $4,700,000.

=== World Series of Poker bracelets ===
Year	Event	Prize Money
2008	$10,000 Limit Hold'em World Championship	$496,931
