= Dan Idema =

Canadian ice hockey and poker player

Daniel Idema

World Series of Poker
- Bracelets: 3
- Final tables: 7
- Money finishes: 25
- Highest WSOP Main Event finish: None

World Poker Tour
- Title: None
- Final table: None
- Money finishes: 2

Daniel Idema is a Canadian professional poker player from South Delta, British Columbia.

In 2007, Idema won the $2,500 buy-in British Columbia Poker Championship main event, beating out a field of 643 players to win the $410,000 first prize.

In 2011, Idema bested a field of 152 players to take down the $10,000 buy-in Limit Holdem Championship at the 2011 World Series of Poker, claiming his first WSOP gold bracelet and $378,642.

In 2013, Idema won his second gold World Series of Poker bracelet, in Event #39, which was the $1,500 buy-in Seven Card Stud hi/lo.

== World Series of Poker Bracelets ==
Year	Tournament	Prize (US$)
2011	$10,000 Limit Hold'em Championship	$378,642
2013	$1,500 Seven Card Stud Hi-Lo Split-8 or Better	$184,590
2015	$3,000 H.O.R.S.E.	$261,774

== Hockey ==
Idema played for three years in the Western Hockey League with the Medicine Hat Tigers and one year in the Ontario Hockey League with the Saginaw Spirit. In 2004, he anchored the Medicine Hat Tiger defence corps that included future NHL players Cam Barker and Kris Russell that played for the Memorial Cup in Kelowna, British Columbia. Idema finished his junior career with the Surrey Eagles of the BCHL and ended up with a total of 12 goals and 25 assists over his four years in junior hockey.
