= Daniel Alaei =

Professional poker player (born 1982)

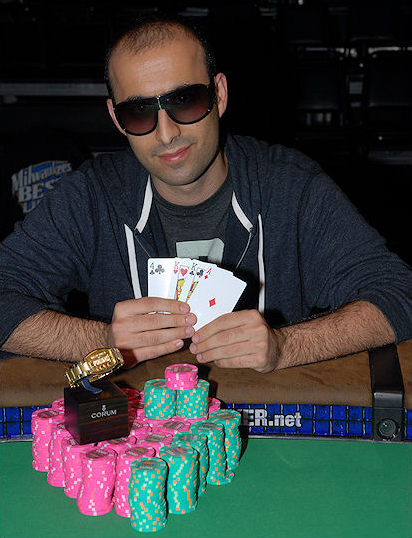
- Alaei after winning event 18 of the 2009 World Series of Poker
- Born: 1982 (age 43–44)

World Series of Poker
- Bracelets: 5
- Money finishes: 31
- Highest WSOP Main Event finish: 25th, 2007

World Poker Tour
- Title: 1
- Final table: 1
- Money finishes: 10

Daniel Christopher Alaei (born 1982) is a professional poker player from Santa Fe Springs, California. He is of Assyrian descent.

Primarily a $50–100 no-limit Texas hold 'em cash game player, Alaei won his first World Series of Poker bracelet in 2006 in a no-limit 2–7 draw Lowball event. He was featured on the first three seasons of High Stakes Poker.

In 2007, Alaei cashed in the 2007 World Series of Poker Main Event, coming in a career-best 25th place out of a field of 6,358 players and winning $333,490. Alaei has two other Main Event cashes (59th in 2004 and 140th in 2005).

On December 19, 2009, he outlasted a field of 329 players to take down the WPT Doyle Brunson Five Diamond Classic, winning $1,428,430. He beat a final table that included poker professionals Scotty Nguyen and Josh Arieh, whom he defeated heads-up to win the tournament.

At the 2010 World Series of Poker, Alaei first finished 7th in the $50,000 Player's Championship Event for $221,105 before clinching his third WSOP bracelet when he defeated 345 players to win the $10,000 Pot Limit Omaha Championship for $780,599.

At the 2013 World Series of Poker, Alaei won his fourth WSOP bracelet, winning the $10,000 Pot Limit Omaha Championship for $852,692.

At the 2015 World Series of Poker, Alaei won the $10,000 Omaha Hi-Lo 8 or Better Championship event for his fifth career bracelet and $391,097.

As of 2023, his total live tournament winnings exceed $7,400,000. His 42 cashes at the WSOP account for $4,727,644 of those winnings.

== World Series of Poker Bracelets ==
Year	Tournament	Prize (US$)
2006	$5,000 No-Limit 2-7 Draw Lowball w/ Rebuys	$430,698
2009	$10,000 World Championship Omaha Hi/Lo 8-or-better	$445,898
2010	$10,000 Pot-limit Omaha Championship	$780,599
2013	$10,000 Pot-limit Omaha Championship	$852,692
2015	$10,000 Omaha Hi-Lo 8 or Better Championship	$391,097
