= 2011 World Series of Poker Europe results =

Below are the results for the 2011 World Series of Poker Europe.

== Key ==
*	Elected to the Poker Hall of Fame
(#/#)	This denotes a bracelet winner. The first number is the number of bracelets won in 2011. The second number is the total number of bracelets won. Both numbers represent totals as of that point during the tournament.
Place	What place each player finished
Name	The player who made it to the final table
Prize (€)	The amount of money, in Euros (€), awarded for each finish at the event's final table

== Results ==
=== Event 1: €2,680 Six Handed No Limit Hold'em ===
- 3-Day Event: October 7, 2011 to October 9, 2011
- Number of buy-ins: 360
- Total Prize Pool: €864,000
- Number of Payouts: 36
- Winning Hand: 8♥ 5♣

Final Table
Place	Name	Prize
1st	Guillaume Humbert (1/1)	€215,999
2nd	Azusa Maeda	€133,471
3rd	Roy Finlay	€92,629
4th	Matan Kraków	€65,068
5th	Adrien Allain	€46,250
6th	Marton Czuczor	€33,255

=== Event 2: €1,090 No Limit Hold'em ===
- 5-Day Event: October 8, 2011 to October 12, 2011
- Number of buy-ins: 771
- Total Prize Pool: €740,160
- Number of Payouts: 81
- Winning Hand: A♠ K♠

Final Table
Place	Name	Prize
1st	Andrew Hinrichsen (1/1)	€148,030
2nd	Gianluca Speranza	€91,262
3rd	Tarcisio Bruno	€67,281
4th	Bernard Guigon	€50,146
5th	Roberto Romanello	€37,874
6th	Eric Baudry	€28,977
7th	John Eames	€22,449
8th	Nabil Nedjai	€17,608
9th	Gregory Lejolivet	€13,982

=== Event 3: €5,300 Pot Limit Omaha ===
- 3-Day Event: October 10, 2011 to October 12, 2011
- Number of buy-ins: 180
- Total Prize Pool: €882,000
- Number of Payouts: 18
- Winning Hand: A♣ K♥ Q♦ 3♥

Final Table
Place	Name	Prize
1st	Steve Billirakis (1/2)	€238,140
2nd	Michele Di Lauro	€147,171
3rd	Ramzi Jelassi	€105,937
4th	Sam Trickett	€77,642
5th	Jerome Bradpiece	€57,912
6th	Konstantin Uspenskiy	€43,950
7th	Erich Kollmann	€33,922
8th	Sam Chartier	€26,610
9th	Eoghan O'Dea	€21,221

=== Event 4: €3,200 No Limit Hold'em SHOOTOUT ===
- 3-Day Event: October 11, 2011 to October 13, 2011
- Number of buy-ins: 258
- Total Prize Pool: €743,040
- Number of Payouts: 30
- Winning Hand: J♠ J♥

Final Table
Place	Name	Prize
1st	Tristan Wade (1/1)	€182,048
2nd	Michael Watson	€112,526
3rd	Richard Toth	€84,016
4th	Max Silver	€63,151
5th	Bertrand Grospellier (1/1)	€47,763
6th	Steve O'Dwyer	€36,357
7th	Emil Patel	€27,842
8th	Taylor Paur	€21,459
9th	James Dempsey (0/1)	€16,637
10th	John Armbrust	€12,981

=== Event 5: €10,400 No Limit Hold'em (Split Format) ===
- 4-Day Event: October 12, 2011 to October 15, 2011
- Number of buy-ins: 125
- Total Prize Pool: €1,200,000
- Number of Payouts: 16
- Winning Hand: A♥ 10♦

Final Table
Place	Name	Prize
1st	Michael Mizrachi (1/2)	€336,008
2nd	Shawn Buchanan	€207,624
SF	Roger Hairabedian	€112,092
SF	Noah Schwartz	€112,092
QF	Dan Fleyshman	€54,810
QF	Brian Powell	€54,810
QF	Anatolii Ozhenilok	€54,810
QF	Brian Hastings	€54,810

=== Event 6: €1,620 Six-Handed Pot Limit Omaha ===
- 3-Day Event: October 13, 2011 to October 15, 2011
- Number of buy-ins: 339
- Total Prize Pool: €498,330
- Number of Payouts: 36
- Winning Hand: A♠ Q♣ 10♦ 9♣

Final Table
Place	Name	Prize
1st	Philippe Boucher (1/1)	€124,584
2nd	Michel Dattani	€76,982
3rd	Nicolas Fierro	€53,426
4th	Alexander Dovzhenko	€37,529
5th	Jarred Solomon	€26,676
6th	Jack Ellwood	€19,181

=== Event 7: €10,400 WSOPE Main Event Championship ===
- 5-Day Event: October 15, 2011 to October 19, 2011
- Number of buy-ins: 593
- Total Prize Pool: €5,692,800
- Number of Payouts: 64
- Winning Hand: A♦ 10♠

Final Table
Place	Name	Prize
1st	Elio Fox (1/1)	€1,400,000
2nd	Chris Moorman	€800,000
3rd	Moritz Kranich	€550,000
4th	Brian Roberts	€400,000
5th	Dermot Blain	€275,000
6th	Shawn Buchanan	€200,000
7th	Jake Cody (1/1)	€150,000
8th	Max Silver	€115,000
