= European Poker Tour season 3 results =

EPT Season 3
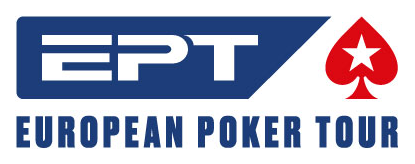
- League: European Poker Tour
- Sport: Poker
- Duration: September 13, 2006 – April 2, 2007
- Total attendance: 3,481 (Main Event only)

Statistics
- Countries: Spain – Barcelona; United Kingdom – London; Austria – Baden; Ireland – Dublin; Denmark – Copenhague; Germany – Dortmund; Poland – Warsaw; Monaco – Monte Carlo
- Top Season 3 Money List: (United States) Gavin Griffin ($2,434,060)

EPT seasons
- ← Season 2 Season 4 →

Below are the results of the third season of the European Poker Tour (EPT). All currency amounts are in "€" Euro, U$ Dollar (and local currency when apply).

== Results ==
=== (Spain) EPT Barcelona Open ===
- Casino: Casino Barcelona. Barcelona, Spain
- Buy-in: €4,800+200 (~$6,334)
- 7-day event: Monday, September 11, 2006, to Sunday, September 17, 2006
- 4-day main event: Wednesday, September 13, 2006, to Saturday, September 16, 2006
- Number of buy-ins: 480
- Total prize pool: €2,304,000 (~$2,918,733)
- Number of payouts: 45
- Winning hand: 10♥ 10♦
- Board: 5♣ J♥ 10♠ 8♦ 8♥
- Losing hand: A♥ 5♥
- Official results: The Hendom Mob
- Videos:

EPT Barcelona Season 3 (2006 Barcelona Open) – Day 1 (1h09m59s)
EPT Barcelona Season 3 (2006 Barcelona Open) – Day 2 (1h10m07s)
EPT Barcelona Season 3 (2006 Barcelona Open) – Final table (1h11m08s)

Barcelona Open 2006: European Poker Tour.

Bjorn-Erik Glenne, a 35-year-old Norwegian, beat some of the best poker players in the world to win €691,000 at the PokerStars.com European Poker Tour Barcelona Open.
At the end of a four-day tournament, the former marketing manager triumphed heads-up against American superstar Phil Ivey to take the top prize in the €5,000 buy-in No Limit Texas Hold'em event.
The tournament was the first event of EPT Season 3 and attracted a record-breaking 480 players. The field was 155 more than previous year, making it the largest attendance for an EPT event and creating a prize pool of €2,304,000

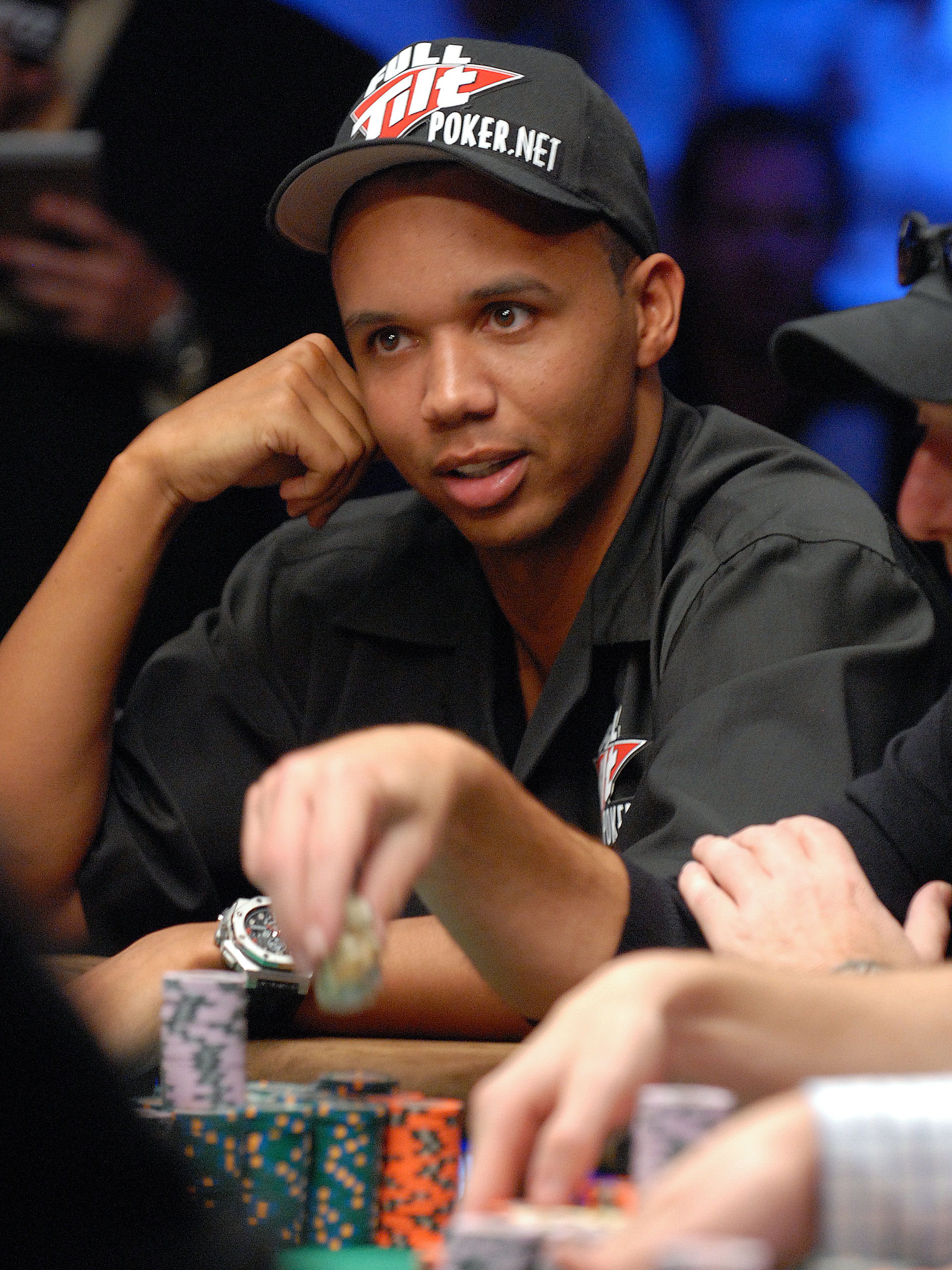
2nd place: Phil Ivey

Final table
Place	Name	Original prize	Prize (U$D)
1st	(Norway) Bjorn-Erik Glenne	€691,000	$875,403
2nd	(United States) Phil Ivey	€371,000	$470,006
3rd	(England) Dave Gregory	€184,300	$233,483
4th	(United States) David Daneshgar	€161,300	$204,345
5th	(Sweden) Joakim Geigert	€138,200	$175,080
6th	(Australia) Jeff Lisandro	€115,200	$145,942
7th	(United States) Jonathan Dull	€92,200	$116,804
8th	(England) Robin Keston	€69,100	$87,540

=== (United Kingdom) EPT London 2006 European Poker Championships ===
- Casino: The Poker Room formerly The Vic, London, United Kingdom
- Buy-in: £3,500+50 (~€5,292) (~$6,685)
- 9-day event: Saturday, September 16, 2006, to Sunday, September 24, 2006
- 4-day main event: Thursday, September 21, 2006, to Sunday, September 24, 2006
- Number of buy-ins: 398
- Total prize pool: £1,393,000 (~€2,076,563) (~$2,623,056)
- Number of payouts: 32
- Winning hand: 7♦ 6♣
- Board: 5♣ 3♣ 4♦ 10♦ J♠
- Losing hand: 8♣ 6♥
- Official results: The Hendom Mob
- Videos:

YouTube: EPT London Season 3 (The European Poker Championships) – Day 1 (1h09m16)
YouTube: EPT London Season 3 (The European Poker Championships) – Day 2 (01h09m44)
YouTube: EPT London Season 3 (The European Poker Championships) – Final table (1h11m23)

Vicky Coren, 34 years, the daughter of humorist Alan Coren, is a regular poker pundit and writes a column for The Guardian newspaper. She gained fame as a regular on Channel 4's Late Night Poker show and recently presented the popular BBC series Balderdash & Piffle. Until EPT London 2006, her previous best win was winning £25,000 in the 2004 Celebrity Poker Challenge.

"I am so happy and proud to win this tournament in the Victoria casino.The whole EPT is an amazing thing – it's a fantasy to win any EPT event – but to win in London at the Vic is beyond my wildest dreams."
Vicky Coren

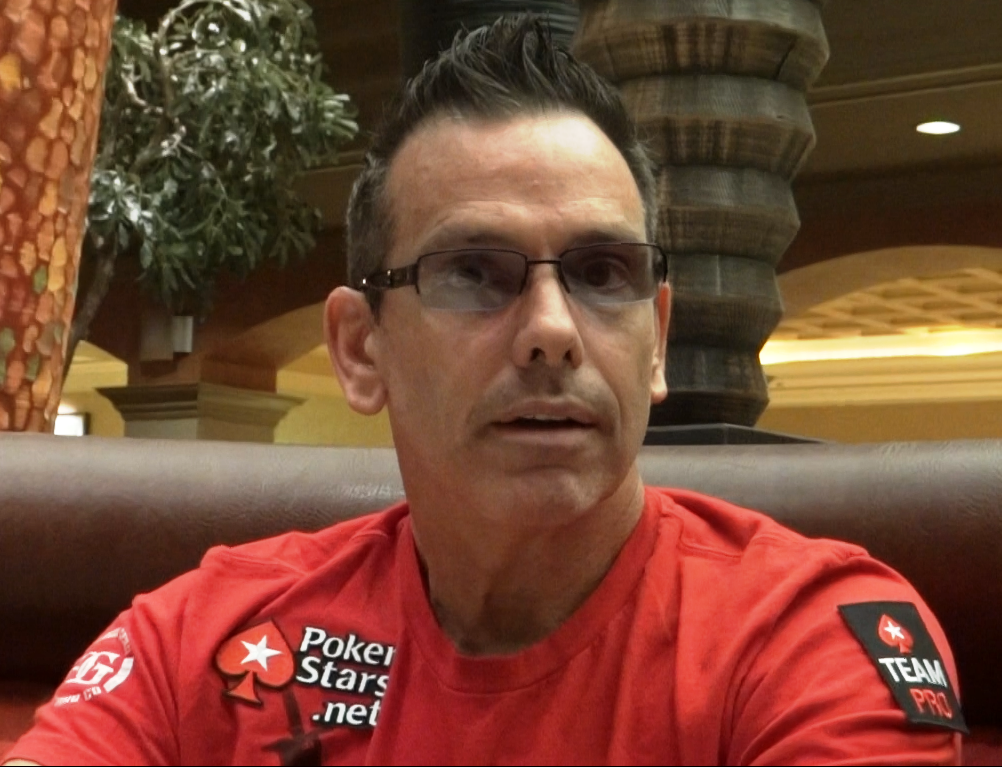
5th place: Chad Brown

Final table
Place	Name	Original prize	Prize (€uro)	Prize (U$D)
1st	(England) Victoria Coren	£500,000	€737,864	$941,513
2nd	(Australia) Emad Tahtouh	£285,900	€421,910	$538,357
3rd	(Norway) Jan Sjavik	£168,600	€248,807	$317,478
4th	(England) Michael Muldoon	£110,000	€162,330	$207,132
5th	(United States) Chad Brown	£58,600	€86,477	$110,345
6th	(Sweden) Jules Dreamell	£44,000	€64,932	$82,853
7th	(Sweden) Peter Hedlund	£36,600	€54,011	$68,918
8th	(England) Sid Harris	£29,300	€43,237	$55,172

=== (Austria) EPT Baden The Big Double ===
- Casino: Casinos Austria, Baden, Austria
- Buy-in: €5,000 (~$6,351)
- 9-day event: Friday, October 6, 2006, to Saturday, October 14, 2005
- 4-day main event: Saturday, October 7, 2006, to Tuesday, October 10, 2006
- Number of buy-ins: 331
- Total prize pool: €1,572,397 (~$1,997,227)
- Number of payouts: 36
- Winning hand: 4♦ 4♣
- Board: Q♣ 3♥ A♥ 4♥ 9♦
- Losing hand: K♥ 3♠
- Official results: The Hendom Mob
- Videos:

YouTube: EPT Baden Season 3 (The Big Double 2006) – Day 1 (1h10m19s)
YouTube: EPT Baden Season 3 (The Big Double 2006) – Final table (1h11m53s)

EPT3 Baden The Big Double

Thang Duc Nguyen, a 42 -year-old chef from Hamburg, Germany, won €487,397 at the PokerStars.com European Poker Tour in Baden, Austria.
At the end of the four-day tournament, Nguyen triumphed heads-up against New Yorker Ben Johnson to take the top prize in the €5,000 buy-in No Limit Texas Hold'em event. Chess player Johnson, 29, from Brooklyn won €251,560 for second place. The tournament attracted 331 players to the famous Austrian spa resort, nearly double 2005 field, creating a prize pool of €1,572,250.
Nguyen – originally from Ho Chi Minh City in Vietnam – has had some impressive wins in recent months, including two final tables in September's PokerStars.com World Championship of Online Poker picking up a total of €35,000. Prior to this win, Nguyen said he wasn't ready to give up his day job as a chef, but admitted he is now considering "taking a nice family holiday".
The fearless Italian Dario Minieri, 22, who is set to become a huge name on the European poker circuit, finished third with €125,780. Belgian PokerStars qualifier Daniel Dodet finished 4th for €110,000.

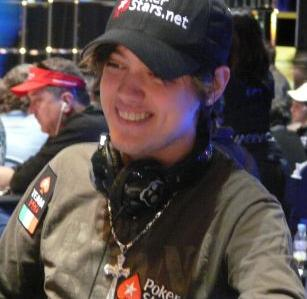
3rd place: Dario Minieri

Final table
Place	Name	Original prize	Prize (U$D)
1st	(Germany) Duc Thang Nguyen	€487,397	$619,082
2nd	(United States) Ben Johnson	€251,560	$319,526
3rd	(Italy) Dario Minieri	€125,780	$159,763
4th	(Belgium) Daniel Dodet	€110,060	$139,796
5th	(Germany) Sascha Biorac	€94,330	$119,816
6th	(Russia) Rodion Cherednichenko	€87,610	$111,280
7th	(Sweden) Jonas Molander	€62,890	$79,882
8th	(Sweden) Peter Eichhardt	€47,167	$59,911

= PokerStars Online Qualifier

=== (Republic of Ireland) EPT Dublin The Irish Masters 2006 ===
- Casino: Regency Hotel Dublin Airport, Dublin, Ireland
- Buy-in: €5,000 (~$6,287)
- 5-day event: Wednesday, October 25, 2006, to Sunday, October 29, 2006
- 4-day main event: Thursday, October 26, 2006, to Sunday, October 29, 2006
- Number of buy-ins: 389
- Total prize pool: €1,847,750 (~$2,323,337)
- Number of payouts: 32
- Winning hand: 5♠ 4♣
- Board: 3♥ 5♦ A♠ 5♥ 9♣
- Losing hand: Q♠ J♥
- Official results: The Hendom Mob
- Videos:

YouTube: EPT Dublin Season 3 (The Irish Masters) – Day 1 (1h10m11s)
YouTube: EPT Dublin Season 3 (The Irish Masters) – Day 2 (1h10m02s)
YouTube: EPT Dublin Season 3 (The Irish Masters) – Final table (1h09m53s)

EPT3 Dublin – Roland De Wolfe wins Dublin EPT

Londoner Roland De Wolfe, 27, cemented an awesome 15 months of poker success since October 29, 2006 by taking the €554,300 top prize at the PokerStars.com European Poker Tour event in Dublin.
De Wolfe, 27, a former poker writer, beat a tough field of 389 players in the four-day No Limit Texas Hold'em event, which generated a total prize pool of €1,847,750. De Wolfe, who won the World Poker Tour (WPT) event in Paris in 2005, becomes the first player to win both EPT and WPT titles.
PokerStars qualifier David Tavernier, 50, – a Parisian anaesthetist who plays poker as a hobby – came second for €314,120, with 23-year-old Swedish pro William Thorson taking third place for €184,780.
De Wolfe said:

"This week I didn't have the luck of the Irish, I had the luck of the whole of Europe. It's an honour to be the first person to win an EPT title and a WPT title when there are so many good players out there. I'm thrilled."
Roland De Wolfe

Winner: Roland De Wolfe

Final table
Place	Name	Original prize	Prize (U$D)
1st	(England) Roland De Wolfe	€554,300	$696,970
2nd	(France) David Tavernier	€314,120	$394,970
3rd	(Sweden) William Thorson	€184,780	$232,340
4th	(England) Gavin Simms	€138,580	$174,249
5th	(Republic of Ireland) George McKeever	€112,710	$141,720
6th	(England) Robert Yong	€88,690	$111,518
7th	(England) Nick Slade	€70,210	$88,281
8th	(France) Patrick Bueno	€51,740	$65,057

= PokerStars Online Qualifier

=== (Denmark) EPT Copenhagen Scandinavian Open ===
- Casino: Casino Copenhagen, Copenhagen, Denmark
- Buy-in: DKr.37,500 (~€5,022) (~$6,496)
- 7-day event: Monday, January 15, 2007, to Sunday, January 21, 2007
- 4-day main event: Wednesday, January 17, 2007, to Saturday, January 20, 2007
- Number of buy-ins: 400
- Total prize pool: DKr.13,824,000 (~€1,850,650) (~$2,394,927)
- Number of payouts: 40
- Winning hand: Q♣ 6♣
- Board: Q♠ 7♥ 6♥ J♠ 10♣
- Losing hand: A♥ J♥
- Official results: The Hendom Mob
- Videos:

YouTube: EPT Copenhagen Season 3 (EPT Scandinavian Open) – Day 1 (1h10m08)
YouTube: EPT Copenhagen Season 3 (EPT Scandinavian Open) – Day 2 (1h11m44)
YouTube: EPT Copenhagen Season 3 (EPT Scandinavian Open) – Final table (1h09m35s)

EPT3 Copenhagen: Petersson takes title

Swede Magnus Petersson has won the EPT Copenhagen, beating Team PokerStars' ElkY heads up to win €550,000. "This is a very good feeling," he said. "I played tight early on and then changed gears when it mattered."
ElkY had a commanding lead when they sat down together, but two hands turned the tables. First Petersson rivered a full house to beat ElkY's trips. He pushed all in with the nuts, and ElkY had to call.
Petersson said:

"I have no real plans for tonight – maybe a drink. My girlfriend lives a couple of hours from Stockholm and bought a car today, a BMW. This money will pay for it. I am a financial advisor, so I will now advise myself to invest in some stocks and bonds."
Magnus Petersson

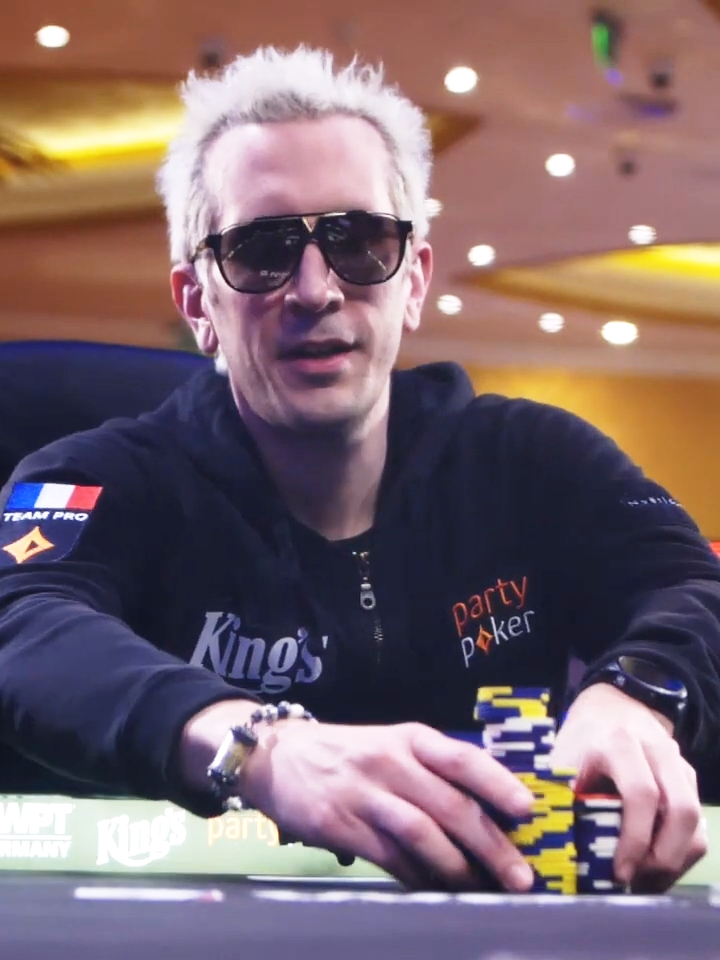
2nd place: Bertrand "ElkY" Grospellier

Final table
Place	Name	Original prize	Prize (€uro)	Prize (U$D)
1st	(Sweden) Magnus Petersson	DKr.4,078,080	€545,942	$706,503
2nd	(France) Bertrand Grospellier	DKr.2,308,608	€309,058	$399,952
3rd	(Hungary) Richard Toth	DKr.1,340,928	€179,512	$232,307
4th	(Denmark) Theo Jørgensen	DKr.1,022,976	€136,947	$177,224
5th	(Sweden) Samir Shakhtoor	DKr.843,264	€112,889	$146,090
6th	(France) Alexandre Poulain	DKr.663,552	€88,830	$114,956
7th	(Denmark) Thomas Holm	DKr.525,312	€70,324	$91,007
8th	(Sweden) Anders Wijk	DKr.373,248	€49,967	$64,663

= PokerStars Online Qualifier

=== (Germany) EPT Dortmund German Open ===
- Casino: Casino Hohensyburg, Dortmund, Germany
- Buy-in: €5,000 (~$6,551)
- 5-day event: Wednesday, March 7, 2007, to Sunday, March 11, 2007
- 4-day main event: Thursday, March 8, 2007, to Sunday, March 11, 2007
- Number of buy-ins: 493
- Total prize pool: €2,317,100 (~$3,036,271)
- Number of payouts: 48
- Winning hand: Q♠ Q♣
- Board: Q♦ A♥ 8♣ 8♦ K♥
- Losing hand: 10♥ 9♦
- Official results: The Hendom Mob
- Videos:

YouTube: EPT Dortmund Season 3 (EPT German Open) – Day 1 (1h10m25)
YouTube: EPT Dortmund Season 3 (EPT German Open) – Day 2 (1h11m07s)
YouTube: EPT Dortmund Season 3 (EPT German Open) – Final table (1h11m42s)

EPT Dortmund: Hoivold takes EPT German Open

A record-breaking EPT field of 493, one of the biggest prize pools in Europe, one of the nicest guys to take a title. Andreas Hoivold has lifted the EPT German Open trophy here in Dortmund, Germany, collecting a massive €672,000 – but, boy, did he have to work for it.

The Norwegian, 35, clawed his way through a gruelling seven-hour final table using his undoubted talent and cheeky sense of humour to win many new friends, as well as the cash. The victory is his second big result in recent months, after his third-place finish in the Poker Million in London in December, where he secured $250,000. His decision to turn pro just seven months ago now looks inspired. This victory makes him the second Norwegian to lift an EPT title this season, after Erik-Bjorn Glenne's stunning success in Barcelona.

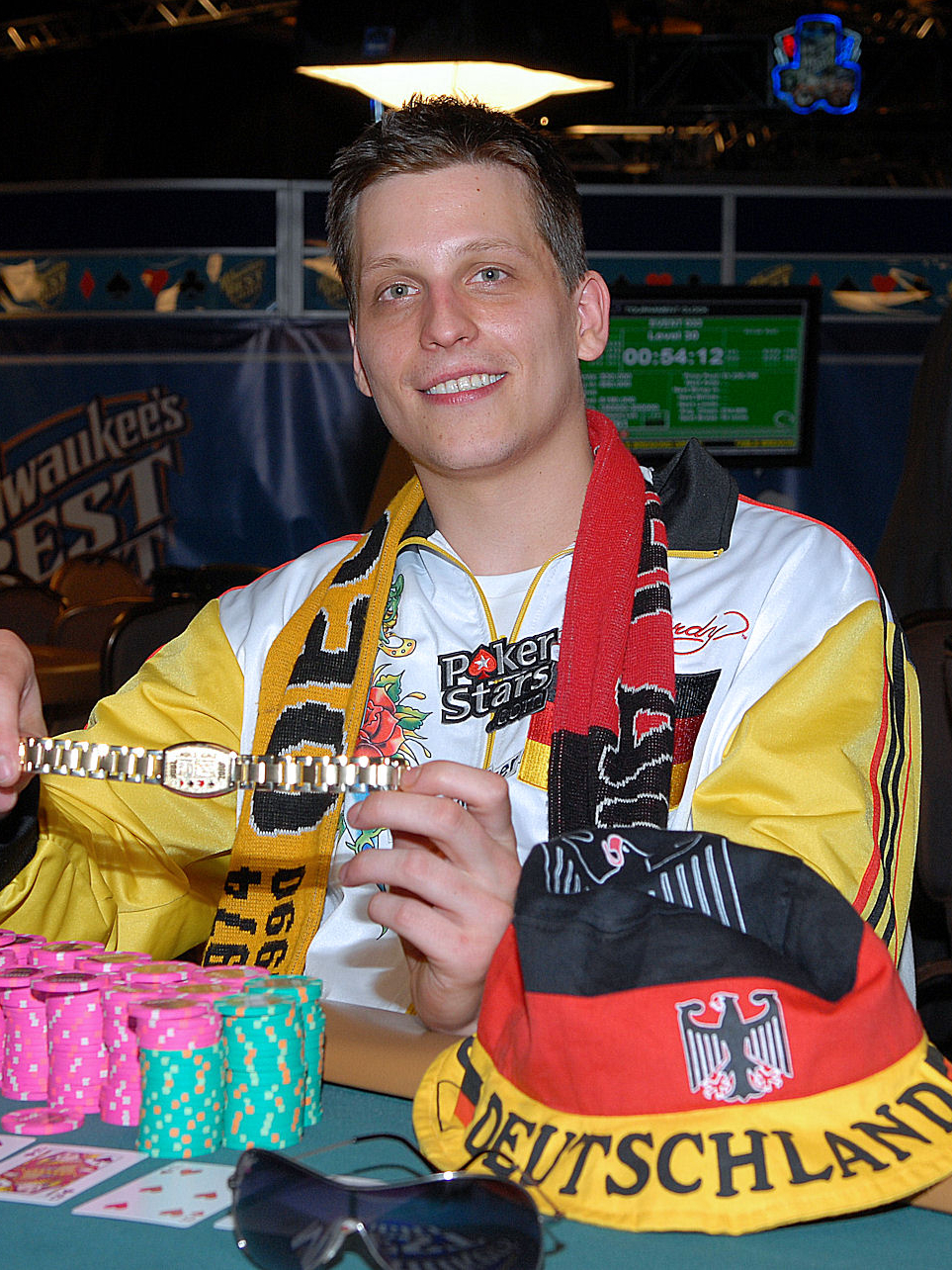
3rd place and online qualifier Sebastian Ruthenberg

Final table
Place	Name	Original prize	Prize (U$D)
1st	(Norway) Andreas Høivold	€672,000	$880,572
2nd	(Italy) Cristiano Blanco	€380,000	$497,943
3rd	(Germany) Sebastian Ruthenberg	€220,000	$288,283
4th	(Sweden) Gunnar Rabe	€169,000	$221,453
5th	(Denmark) Jacob Rasmussen	€139,000	$182,142
6th	(Sweden) Erik Lindberg	€109,000	$142,831
7th	(France) Nicolas Levi	€85,700	$112,299
8th	(France) Thomas Fougeron	€60,300	$79,016

= PokerStars Online Qualifier

=== (Poland) EPT Warsaw Polish Open ===
- Casino: Casinos Poland – Hyatt Regency Hotel, Warsaw, Poland
- Buy-in: zł15,000 (~€3,856) (~$5,083)
- 6-day event: Monday, March 12, 2007, to Saturday, March 17, 2007
- 4-day main event: Tuesday, March 13, 2007, to Saturday, March 17, 2007
- Number of buy-ins: 284
- Total prize pool: zł 4,007,000 (~€1,040,360) (~$1,357,799)
- Number of payouts: 24
- Winning hand: 7♥ 7♠
- Board: 9♣ 6♦ 7♦ 4♠ 2♠
- Losing hand: A♠ 5♦
- Official results: The Hendom Mob

EPT Warsaw: Peter Jepsen wins the Polish Open

Peter Jepsen is our winner in EPT Warsaw. The former soldier took up poker when he was seriously injured in Iraq, and became a different kind of hero today when he took the Polish Open title. This Danish player always stacked his chips with military precision, and had a cool methodical style of play, this made his assault on this EPT title look almost effortless.
Peter had this to say about his win:

"The money is great but I really, really wanted to win this EPT tournament. I won $165,000 at a tournament in St Kitts last year, but it's important to me to have a proper title to my name."
Peter Jepsen

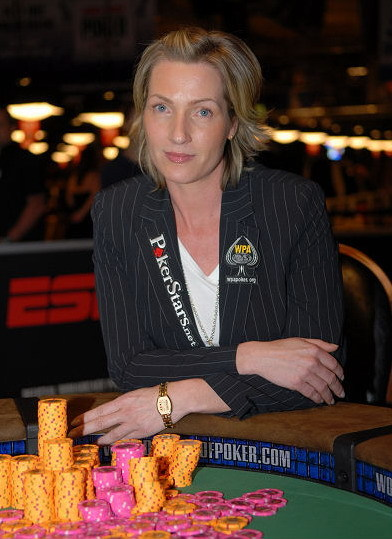
5th place PokerStars team Katja Thater

Final table
Place	Name	Original prize	Prize (€uro)	Prize (U$D)
1st	(Denmark) Peter Jepsen	zł1,226,711	€325,633	$415,679
2nd	(France) Farid Meraghni	zł708,225	€182,063	$239,987
3rd	(Republic of Ireland) John Conroy	zł424,935	€109,238	$143,992
4th	(Norway) Marius Torbergsen	zł303,525	€78,027	$102,851
5th	(Germany) Katja Thater	zł250,914	€64,502	$85,024
6th	(England) Andrew O'Flaherty	zł198,303	€50,978	$67,196
7th	(Sweden) Patrick Martenson	zł157,833	€40,574	$53,483
8th	(Denmark) Frederik Hostrup-Pedersen	zł113,316	€29,130	$38,398

= Team PokerStars Katja Thater
(name)+ = PokerStars Online Qualifier

=== (Monaco) EPT Monte Carlo Grand Final ===
- Casino: Monte-Carlo Bay Hotel & Resort, Monte Carlo, Monaco

Buy-in: €10,000 (€9,600+€400) (~$13,337)

- 7-day event: Tuesday, March 27, 2007, to Monday, April 2, 2007
- 6-day main event: Wednesday, March 28, 2007, to Monday, April 2, 2007
- Number of buy-ins: 706
- Total prize pool: €6,636,400 (~$8,851,130)
- Number of payouts: 64
- Winning hand: K♦ 5♣
- Board: 3♣ 2♠ 4♦ 3♥ K♥
- Losing hand: 7♥ 4♠
- Official results: The Hendom Mob
- Videos:

YouTube: EPT Monte Carlo Season 3 (European Poker Tour Grand Final) – Day 1 (1h10m41s)
YouTube: EPT Monte Carlo Season 3 (European Poker Tour Grand Final) – Day 2 (1h11m38s)
YouTube: EPT Monte Carlo Season 3 (European Poker Tour Grand Final) – Day 3 (13m47s)
YouTube: EPT Monte Carlo Season 3 (European Poker Tour Grand Final) – Final table (1h11m36s)

EPT Monte Carlo: Gavin Griffin wins EPT Grand Final

American Gavin Griffin arrived in Europe for the first time to join 705 other poker hopefuls at the EPT Grand Final – the richest poker tournament ever held outside the US. He returned home to Orange County, California, more than $2.4 million (€1.8 million) richer after beating off competition from some of the best players in the world and winning the six-day No Limit Texas Hold'em event (March 28-April 2, 2007).

The gently-spoken 25-year-old, originally from Chicago, won his seat for the Grand Final in a $240 Double Shoot-Out qualifier on PokerStars. He showed remarkable poker skills during the €10,000 buy-in event and became a tournament favourite after it was revealed that his pink-dyed hair was to mark his involvement in the Avon Walk for Breast cancer charity. Gavin and his girlfriend Kristen, 21, set off on their 39-mile, two-day Los Angeles marathon in September.
PokerStars helped Gavin raise even more money for the Avon Walk for Breast Cancer. In addition to an immediate donation of $15,000, they also set up a special account to raise further funds. For every donation made during the final table on April 2, PokerStars matched it dollar for dollar: the total raised was over $10,000. To donate from now on, go to Gavin's page on the Avon site.
Gavin Griffin had this to say about his win:

"This tournament's structure was awesome, just incredible. It was my first visit to Europe, and you can be assured I will be coming back. I have been supporting the breast cancer charity here because when my girlfiend was 21, she suffered from it. In September we will be doing a 39-mile charity walk over two days as we thought it was important to try and give something back, and hopefully help women in the future."
Gavin Griffin

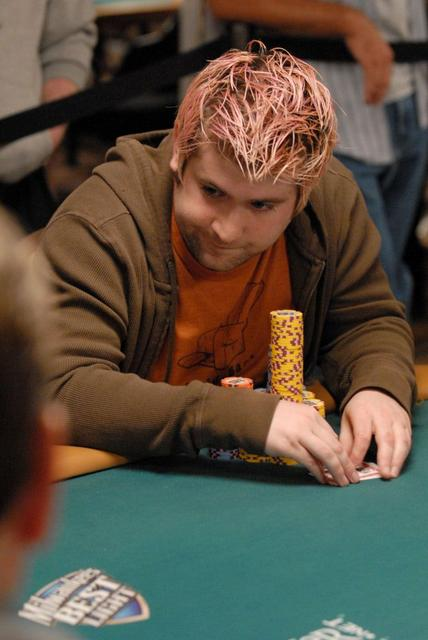
Winner: Gavin Griffin

Final table
Place	Name	Original prize	Prize (U$D)
1st	(United States) Gavin Griffin	€1,825,010	$2,434,060
2nd	(Canada) Marc Karam	€1,061,820	$1,416,175
3rd	(Denmark) Søren Kongsgaard Nielsen	€610,550	$814,305
4th	(Norway) Kristian Kjøndal	€471,180	$628,424
5th	(United States) Joshua Prager	€391,550	$522,219
6th	(England) Steve Jelinek	€305,270	$407,146
7th	(Republic of Ireland) Andy Black	€238,910	$318,640
8th	(England) Ram Vaswani	€159,270	$212,422

= PokerStars Qualifier
