= Triple Crown (poker) =

Poker term

In poker, the term Triple Crown is used to describe an accomplishment achieved when a player has won all three of the following events during their career:

  - Any bracelet at a World Series of Poker event;
  - A Main Event on the World Poker Tour (WPT);
  - A Main Event on the European Poker Tour (EPT, rebranded as the PokerStars Championship for 2017 only).

So far, only 10 players have completed the Triple Crown: Gavin Griffin, Roland De Wolfe, Jake Cody, Bertrand Grospellier, Davidi Kitai, Mohsin Charania, Harrison Gimbel, Niall Farrell, Roberto Romanello, and Mike Watson. In 2008, Griffin won his first World Poker Tour title, becoming the first to complete the feat.

On January 25th, 2010, Jake Cody won the EPT Deauville Main Event and closed out the first of his three Triple Crown legs. He followed that up on September 4th, 2010, winning the WPT London Poker Classic, and completed the crown on June 4th, 2011 by earning a WSOP Bracelet after winning the $25,000 Heads-Up Championship. It took him 1 year, 4 months, 11 days, which is the shortest span of the ten players to complete all three legs of the Triple Crown.

== Triple Crown winners ==
Information correct as of December 2024.

| No | Player | WSOP bracelet(s) | WPT Main Event title(s) | EPT/PSC Main Event title(s) | Time span | Age at time of Triple Crown win | Ref. |
|---|---|---|---|---|---|---|---|
| 1 | (United States) Gavin Griffin | 2004 | 2008 | 2007 | 3 years, 8 months, 17 days | 26 | |
| 2 | (United Kingdom) Roland De Wolfe | 2009 | 2005 | 2006 | 3 years, 10 months, 17 days | 29 | |
| 3 | (United Kingdom) Jake Cody | 2011 | 2010 | 2010 | 1 year, 4 months, 11 days | 22 | |
| 4 | (France) Bertrand "ElkY" Grospellier | 2011, 2019 | 2008 | 2008 | 3 years, 5 months, 5 days | 30 | |
| 5 | (Belgium) Davidi Kitai | 2008, 2013, 2014 | 2011 * | 2012 | 3 years, 10 months | 32 | |
| 6 | (United States) Mohsin Charania | 2017 | 2013, 2014 | 2012 | 5 years, 2 months | 32 | |
| 7 | (United States) Harrison Gimbel | 2017 | 2016 | 2010 | 7 years, 6 months | 32 | |
| 8 | (United Kingdom) Niall Farrell | 2017 | 2016 | 2015 | 2 years, 1 month | 30 | |
| 9 | (United Kingdom) Roberto Romanello | 2020 ** | 2011 | 2010 | 9 years, 7 months | 45 | |
| 10 | (Canada) Mike Watson | 2024 ** | 2008 | 2016, 2023 | 15 years, 11 months, 28 days | 40 | |

*WPT title won in a 482 player invitational tournament
**WSOP bracelet won in an online event

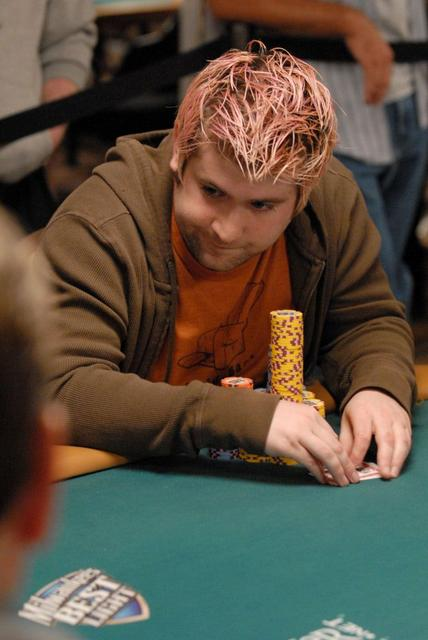
Gavin Griffin
(image from 2007)

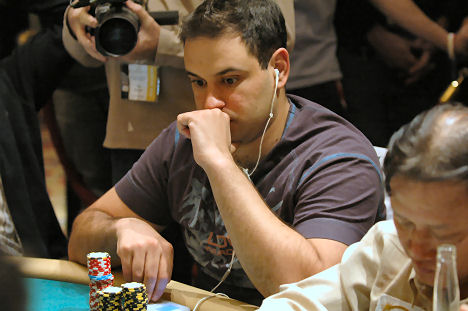
Roland De Wolfe
(image from 2006)

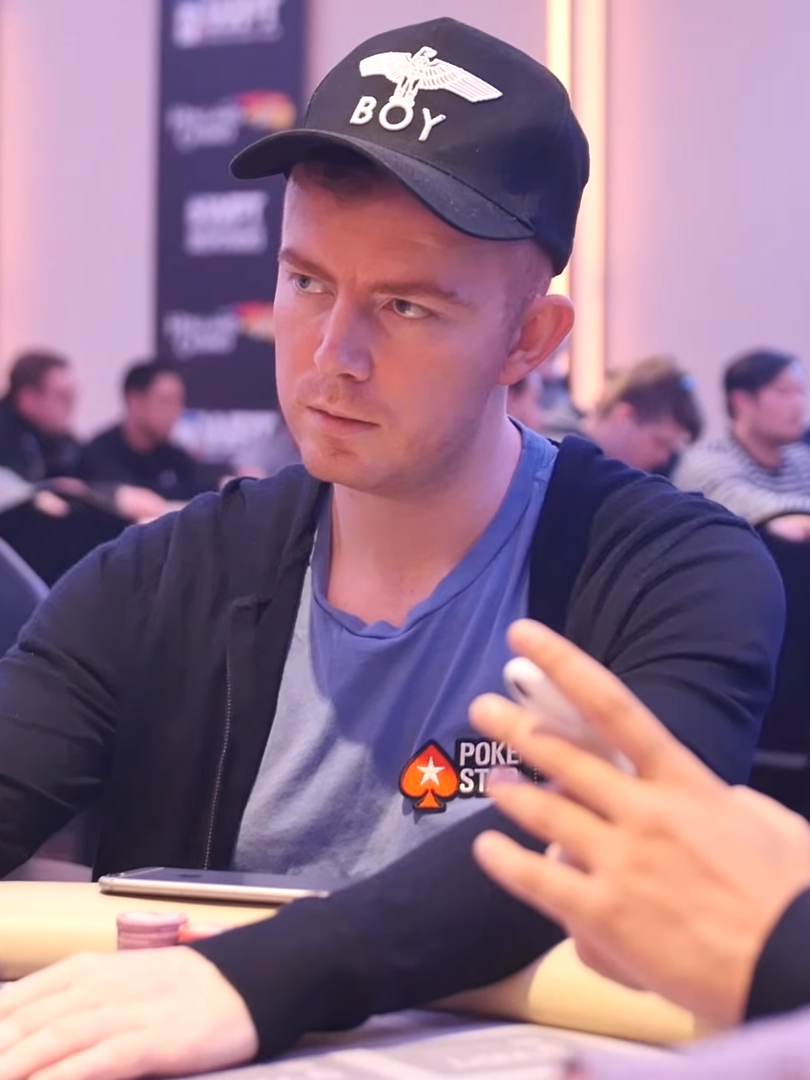
Jake Cody
(image from 2017)

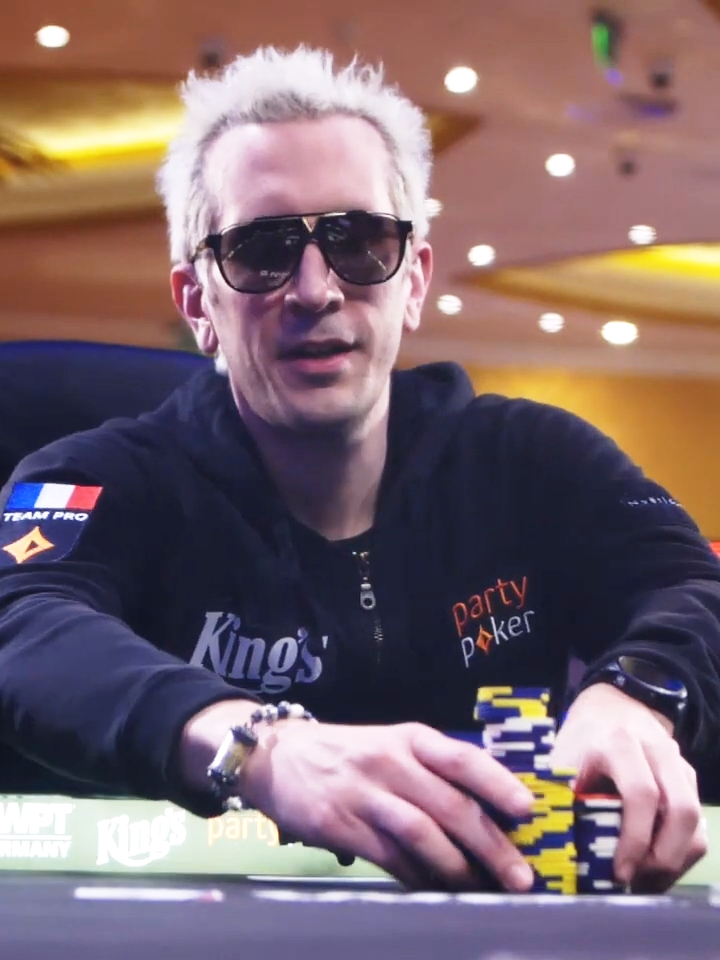
Bertrand Grospellier
(image from 2020)

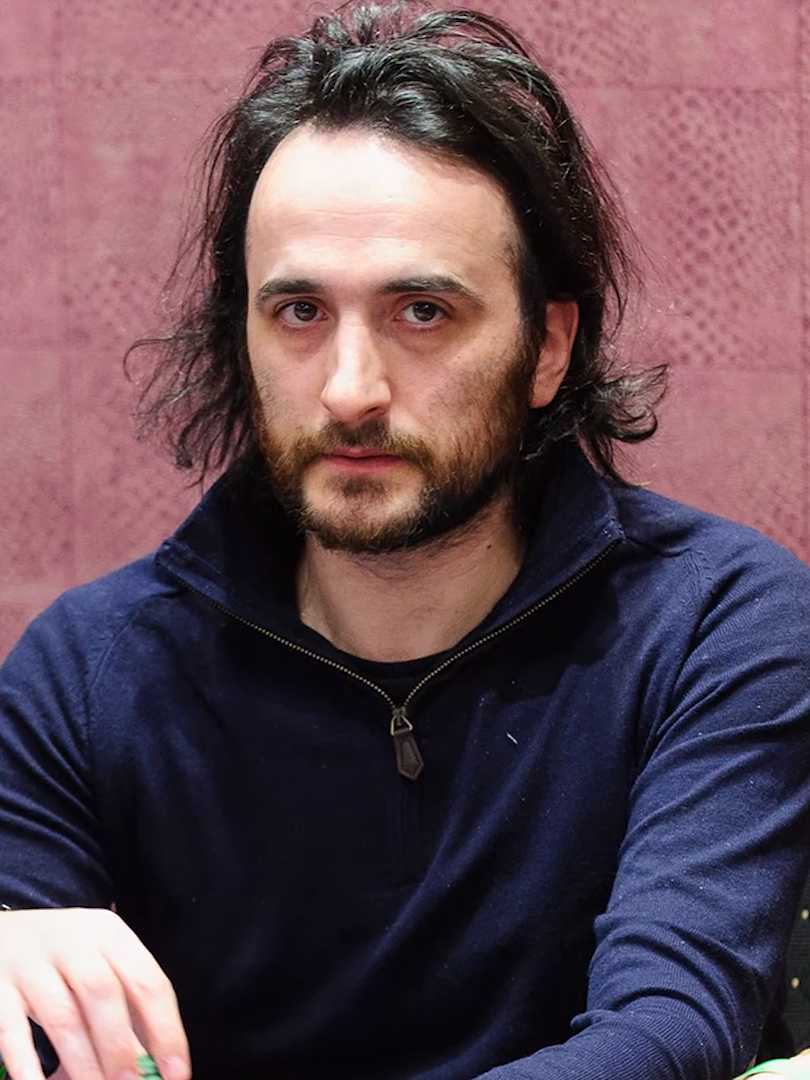
Davidi Kitai
(image from 2018)

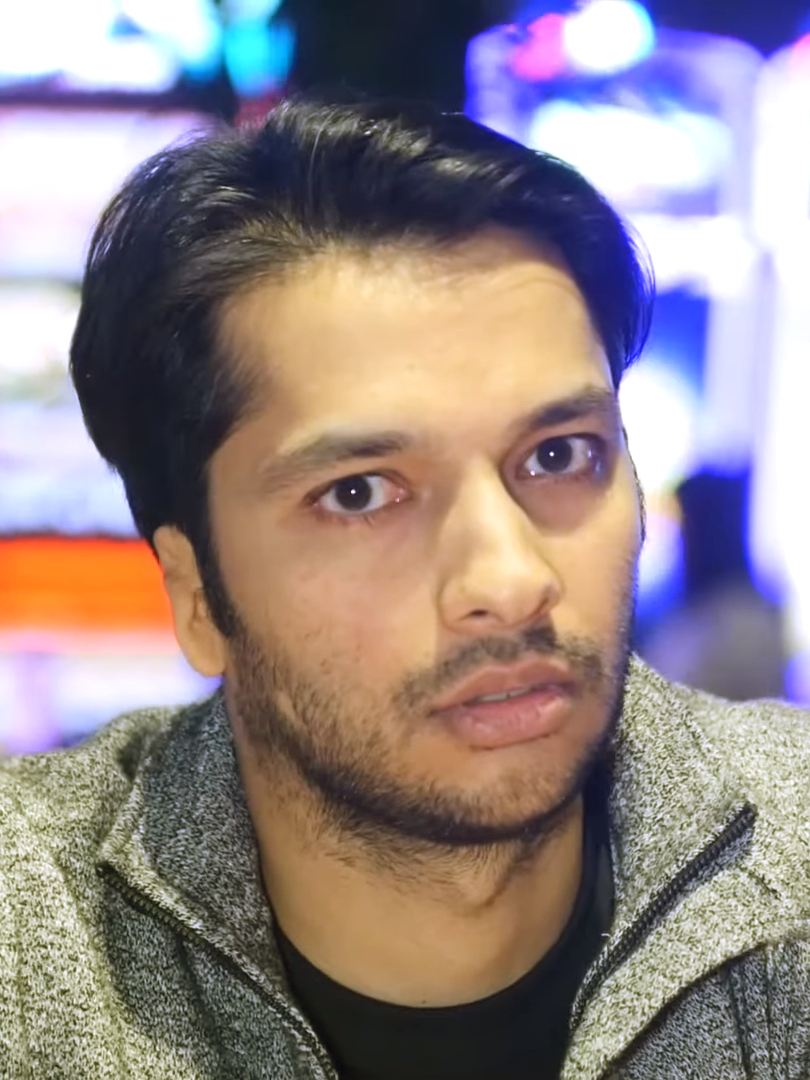
Mohsin Charania
(image from 2019)

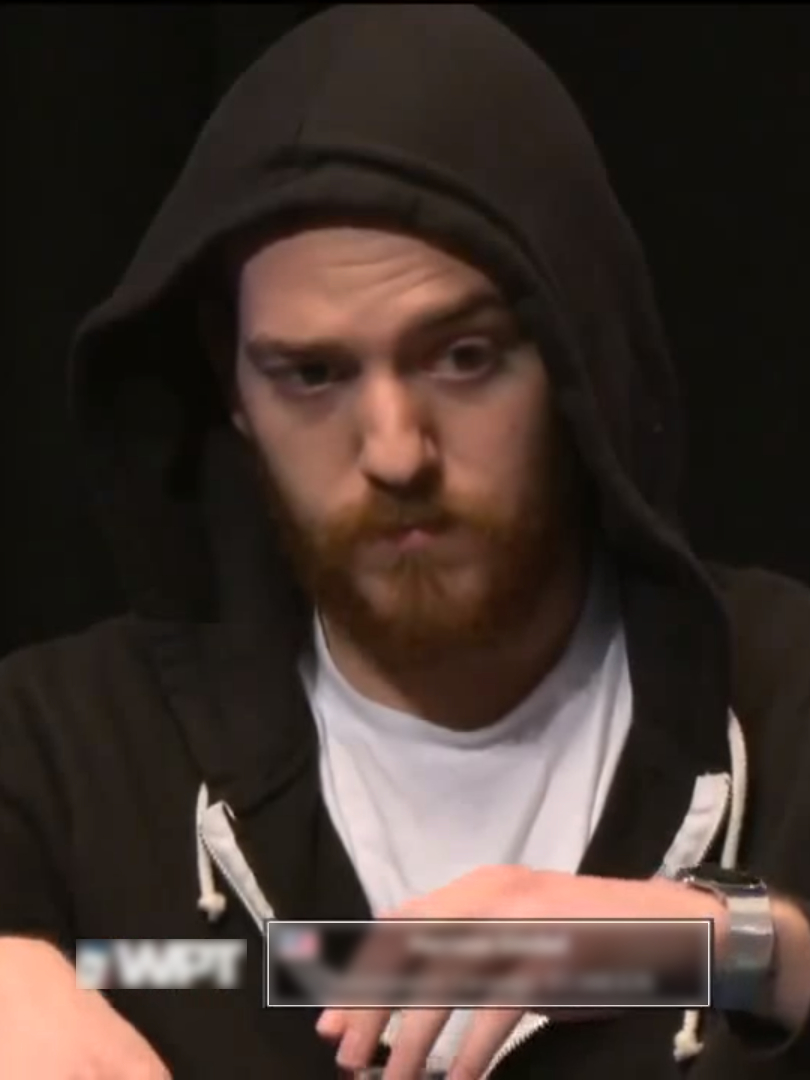
Harrison Gimbel
(image from 2015)

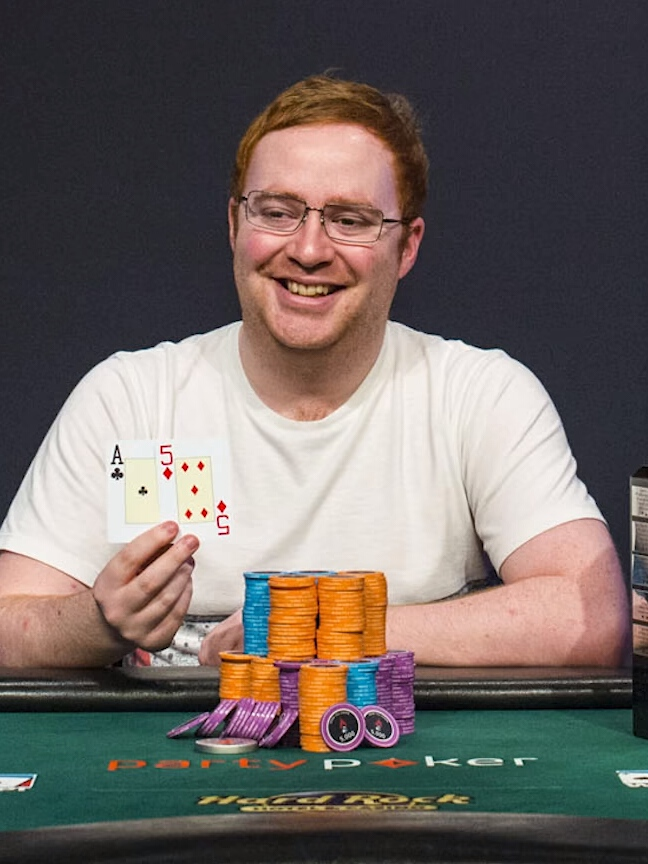
Niall Farrell
(image from 2016)

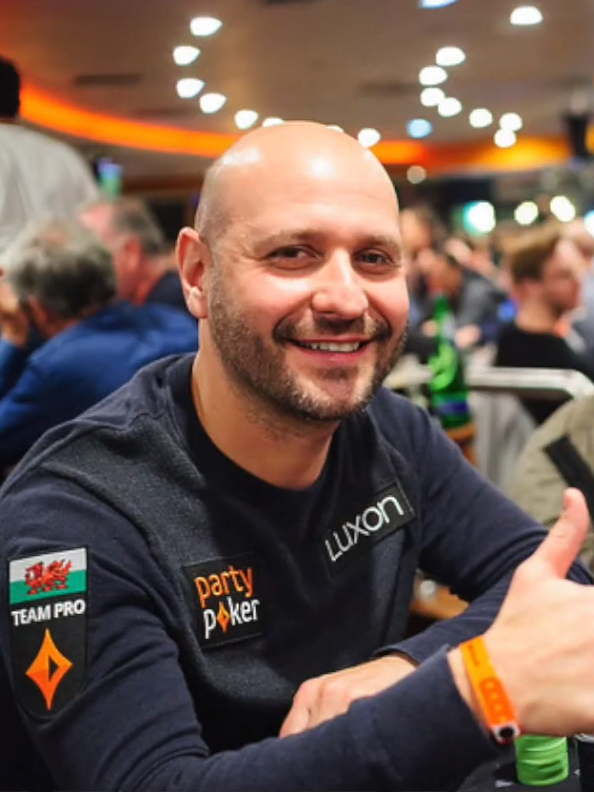
Roberto Romanello
(image from 2019)

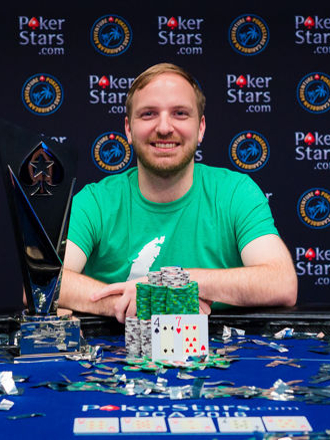
Mike Watson
(image from 2016)

== Players one win away ==
=== Without WSOP bracelet ===
- (Russia) Andrey Pateychuk
- (United States) Chino Rheem
- (Germany) Moritz Kranich
- (Sweden) Simon Brändström

=== Without WPT Main Event title ===
- (Spain) Adrián Mateos
- (Russia) Artur Martirosian
- (United Kingdom) Barny Boatman
- (Canada) Benjamin Wilinofsky
- (United States) Brandon Schaefer
- (United States) Carter Phillips
- (Bulgaria) Dimitar Danchev
- (Poland) Dominik Panka
- (United States) Galen Hall
- (Germany) Hossein Ensan
- (United States) Jason Mercier
- (Finland) Jens Kyllönen
- (Indonesia) John Juanda
- (United States) Kevin MacPhee
- (United Kingdom) Liv Boeree
- (Germany) Manig Löser
- (Germany) Martin Finger
- (Russia) Maxim Lykov
- (Sweden) Michael Tureniec
- (Germany) Oliver Weis
- (Bulgaria) Ognyan Dimov
- (Germany) Paul Michaelis
- (United Kingdom) Ram Vaswani
- (Netherlands) Rob Hollink
- (Germany) Sebastian Ruthenberg
- (United States) Stephen Song
- (United Kingdom) Toby Lewis

=== Without EPT/PSC Main Event title ===
- (United States) Alan Goehring
- (United States) Alan Sternberg
- (United States) Alex Foxen
- (Brazil) Alexandre Gomes
- (United States) Andy Frankenberger
- (United States) Anthony Gregg
- (United States) Anthony Zinno
- (United States) Antonio Esfandiari
- (United States) Arthur Peacock
- (United States) Asher Conniff
- (United States) Barry Greenstein
- (United States) Bill Edler
- (United States) Brandon Cantu
- (United States) Brek Schutten
- (United States) Brian Altman
- (Ecuador) Carlos Mortensen
- (United States) Chad Eveslage
- (United States) Chance Kornuth
- (Canada) Chanracy Khun
- (United Kingdom) Chris Moorman
- (Germany) Christian Rudolph
- (United States) Craig Varnell
- (United States) Dan Harrington
- (United States) Dan Smith
- (United States) Daniel Alaei
- (Canada) Daniel Negreanu
- (United States) Daniel Sepiol
- (United States) Daniel Strelitz
- (United States) Daniel Weinman
- (United States) David "ODB" Baker
- (France) David Benyamine
- (China) David Chiu
- (United States) David Williams
- (Germany) Dietrich Fast
- (Germany) Dominik Nitsche
- (United States) Dylan Linde
- (Israel) Eli Elezra
- (United States) Erick Lindgren
- (United States) Erik Seidel
- (Ukraine) Eugene Katchalov
- (Lebanon) Freddy Deeb
- (Lithuania) Gediminas Uselis
- (Denmark) Gus Hansen
- (United States) Hoyt Corkins
- (United States) Howard Lederer
- (Vietnam) J. C. Tran
- (United States) James Calderaro
- (United Kingdom) James Dempsey
- (Australia) James Obst
- (United States) James Mackey
- (United States) Jared Jaffee
- (Australia) Joe Hachem
- (Finland) Juha Helppi
- (United States) John Hennigan
- (Vietnam) John Phan
- (United States) Keven Stammen
- (United States) Kevin Eyster
- (Germany) Konstantin Held
- (United States) Matt Waxman
- (Australia) Mel Judah
- (Poland) Michael Gracz
- (United States) Michael Mizrachi
- (United States) Michael Wang (poker)
- (Canada) Mike Leah
- (United States) Nick Petrangelo
- (United States) Nick Schulman
- (Serbia) Nenad Medić
- (United States) Noah Schwartz
- (Germany) Ole Schemion
- (United States) Pat Lyons
- (United States) Paul Darden
- (Moldova) Pavel Plesuv
- (Taiwan) Pete Chen
- (United States) Phil Ivey
- (Republic of Ireland) Phil Laak
- (United States) Prahlad Friedman
- (United States) Robert Mizrachi
- (Italy) Rocco Palumbo
- (United States) Ryan Riess
- (United States) Ryan Tosoc
- (United States) Scott Clements
- (United States) Scott Eskenazi
- (United States) Scott Seiver
- (Vietnam) Scotty Nguyen
- (United States) Sean Jazayeri
- (Canada) Shawn Buchanan
- (United States) Shawn Daniels
- (United States) Soheb Porbandarwala
- (United States) Taylor Paur
- (United States) Ted Forrest
- (Denmark) Theo Jørgensen
- (United States) Tony Dunst
- (Vietnam) Tuan Le
- (United States) Tyler Patterson

.

- (United Kingdom) Dave Ulliott (died 2015)
- (Canada) Gavin Smith (died 2019)
- (United Kingdom) John Gale (died 2019)
- (United States) Ron Rose (died 2019)
- (United States) Mike Sexton (died 2020)
- (United States) Layne Flack (died 2021)
- (United States) Doyle Brunson (died 2023)
