= Davidi Kitai =

Belgian poker player (born 1979)

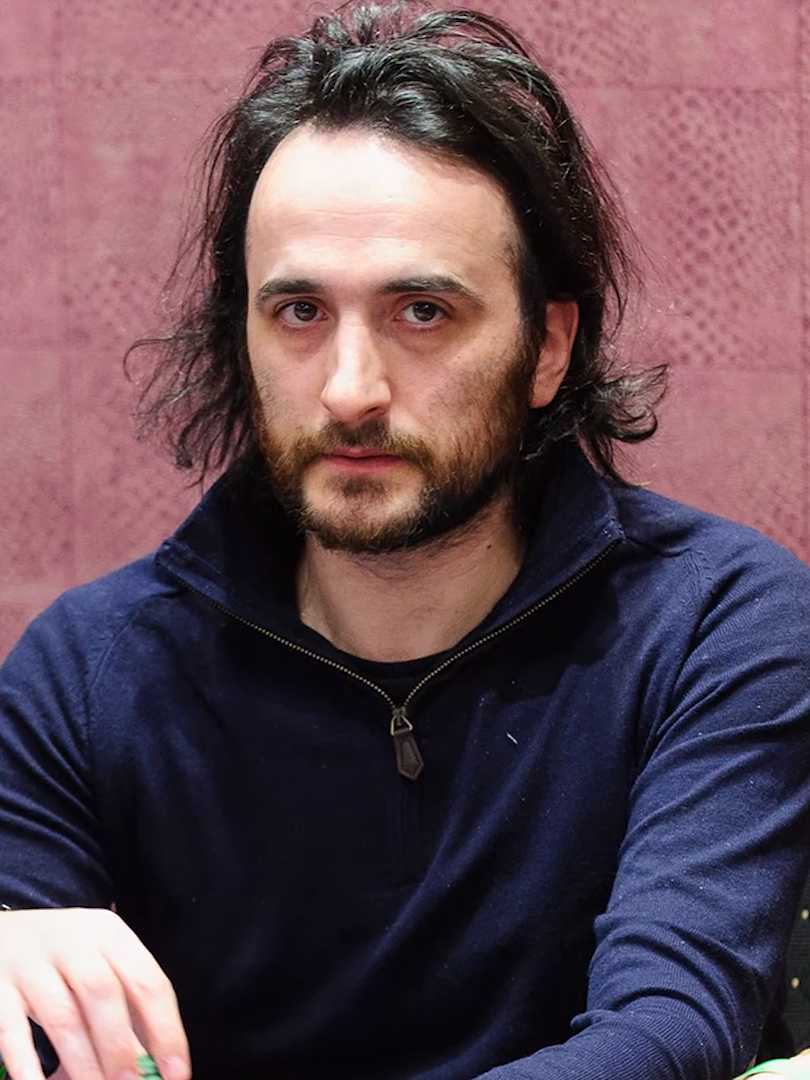
- Kitai in 2018
- Born: 28 September 1979 (age 47)

World Series of Poker
- Bracelets: 3
- Final tables: 9
- Money finishes: 36
- Highest WSOP Main Event finish: 170rd, 2023

World Poker Tour
- Title: 1
- Final tables: 2
- Money finishes: 7

European Poker Tour
- Title: 1
- Final tables: 3
- Money finishes: 17

Davidi Kitai (born 28 September 1979) is a Belgian professional poker player who won the 2008 World Series of Poker $2,000 Pot-Limit Hold'em event for $244,583, becoming the first Belgian to win a WSOP bracelet. He also has won 2 other bracelets and has an EPT title and a WPT title, along with numerous other big scores and titles.

In February 2011, Kitai won his second big title in the WPT Celebrity Invitational event, earning $100,000.

At the 2012 European Poker Tour in Berlin, Kitai won his first EPT title earning €712,000 in the €5,000 Main Event. In the heads-up phase Kitai was trailing Andrew Chen but his infamous hero all-in call with K♣5♣ on a 2♣Q♣8♡-4♠-5♢ board gave him a considerable lead over Chen as he went on to win the match.

He became one of only ten players to win poker's Triple Crown, joining other players like Gavin Griffin, Bertrand Grospellier, Jake Cody, and Roland De Wolfe. Poker's Triple Crown consists of winning a WSOP bracelet as well as main event titles on the WPT and EPT. There was some debate on the legitimacy of his Triple Crown achievement since his WPT win was the Celebrity Invitational event, thus not being an open event and arguments that this charity event had a weakened field. The WPT eventually officially stated that they recognise the Invitational as an official WPT main event.

Kitai won his second bracelet at the 2013 World Series of Poker in the $5,000 Pot-Limit Hold'em event, defeating Cary Katz heads-up and earning $224,560. His third bracelet came in the $3,000 6-Max Event of the 2014 WSOP, where he had to get past Gordon Vayo heads-up to complete his WSOP hattrick while bagging $508,640.

Kitai won the 25K Super High Roller of the PartyPoker Millions Barcelona 2018 for €700,000. In November 2020 Kitai won the Super MILLION$ $10,300 Main Event on GGPoker for $726,839, defeating a final table with other top players like Niklas Åstedt, David Yan, Mike Watson, Aleks Ponakovs and Eelis Parssinen.

On 7 January 2015, Kitai was ranked #2 on the Global poker index, which ranks the top live tournament players in the world

His total live tournament winnings exceed $10,000,000.

== World Series of Poker bracelets ==
Year	Event	Prize Money
2008	$2,000 Pot-Limit Hold'em	$244,583
2013	$5,000 Pot-Limit Hold'em	$224,560
2014	$3,000 No-Limit Hold'em Six Handed	$508,640

== Online Poker ==
Although he mainly plays live tournaments, Kitai has some impressive online scores as well. He plays under the screen name “legrouzin” on PokerStars, where he won hundreds of thousands of dollars in MTT cashes.

In November 2020, he took down the $10,300 Super MILLION$ Main Event for $726,839 on Natural8-GGNetwork.

== Personal life ==
It was Davidi Kitai's childhood dream to become a professional football player. He played on an amateur level for low-tier clubs in Belgium until he was 20.

He then graduated in Economics and moved to Los Angeles at the age of 22.

Later on, he tried to open a running online and retail store in Brussels, Belgium, unsuccessfully.
