= Elio Fox =

American poker player

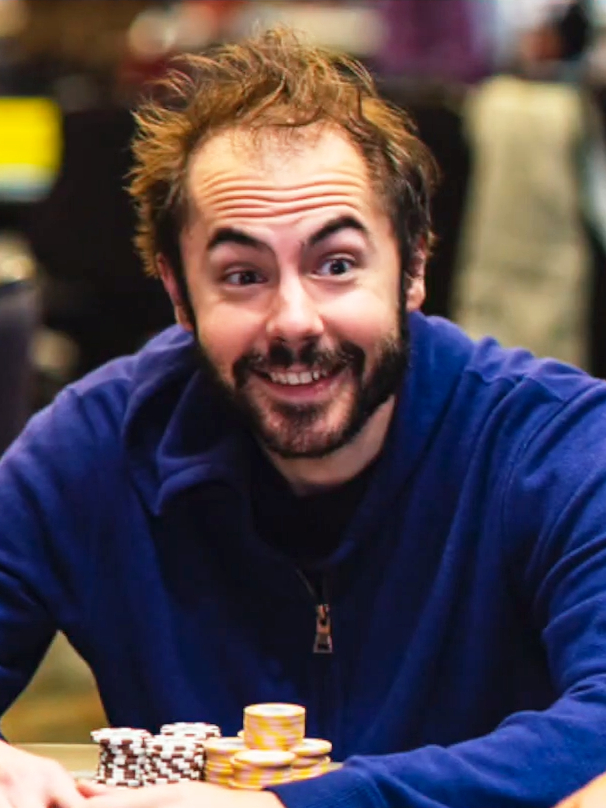
- Elio Fox in 2019
- Nicknames: smokrokbyflock (Full Tilt) smokrokflock (PokerStars); TURBOKING333 (Absolute)

World Series of Poker
- Bracelets: 2
- Final tables: 4
- Money finishes: 15
- Highest WSOP Main Event finish: 163rd, 2015

World Poker Tour
- Final table: 1
- Money finish: 1

European Poker Tour
- Money finish: 1

Elio Fox is an American professional poker player whose first World Series of Poker (WSOP) in the money finish was the 2011 World Series of Poker Europe main event that he won. He has played online, where he is a high-stakes No limit Texas hold'em rebuy specialist, since 2009 but had his first notable live play results in 2011. Prior to the World Series of Poker bracelet that he won at the 2011 WSOP Europe, his best live event finish was the 224-player $10,000 + $300 July 12 – 19, 2011 Bellagio Cup VII victory for a prize of $669,692. The event's final table included Ted Forrest, William Thorson and Brandon Cantu. Fox' other previous live event victory was the 251-player $1,590 June 24 – 26, 2011 Venetian Deep Stack Extravaganza III No-Limit Hold'em Event 30 for a prize of $87,192.

As of 2018, his live tournament winnings exceed $3,750,000.

== World Series of Poker Bracelets ==
Year	Tournament	Prize (US$)
2011E	€10,400 No Limit Texas hold'em	€1,400,000 ($1,927,660)
2018	$10,000 No Limit Hold'em Super Turbo Bounty	$393,693

An "E" following a year denotes bracelet(s) won at the World Series of Poker Europe

His first WSOP in the money finish was the first-place finish in the 593-player 8-handed €10,400 October 15 – 20, 2011 WSOPE Main Event Championship for a prize of €1,400,000 ($1,927,660) over a final table that included Jake Cody, Chris Moorman and Shawn Buchanan.

Fox won his second bracelet at the 2018 WSOP in the $10,000 No-Limit Hold'em Super Turbo Bounty.

== Personal ==
Fox is from New York City and attended Bard College.

== See also ==
- List of World Series of Poker Main Event champions
