= 2011 World Series of Poker Europe =

Series of poker tournaments

The fifth World Series of Poker Europe (WSOPE) took place from 7 October 2011 to 20 October 2011. There were seven bracelet events, culminating in the €10,400 WSOPE Championship No-Limit Hold'em event. Events were held at the Majestic Barrière Cannes and the Le Croisette Casino Barrière in Cannes, France. The 7 official gold bracelet events were complemented by a total of 51 other events in the two-week schedule, the most prominent of which is the €550 Ladies only event. ESPN broadcast the Main Event on its worldwide television network, and all official gold bracelet events streamed live on WSOP.com.

The first four WSOPEs were held at the Casino at the Empire in Leicester Square, London, making 2011 the first WSOPE not held in London and the first whose buy-ins and prize funds were fixed in euros instead of British pounds. 2011 marks the first time that the WSOP Player of the Year Award included all open bracelet events at both the WSOP and the WSOPE, meaning that the results of the 2011 WSOPE and those of the 2011 World Series of Poker are being combined to determine the player of the year. The 2011 WSOP Europe main event was an 8-handed event.

== Event schedule ==
#	Event	Entrants	Winner	Prize	Runner-up	Results	Reference
1	€2,680 Six Handed No Limit Hold'em	360	Guillaume Humbert (1/1)	€215,999	Azusa Maeda	Results	
2	€1,090 No Limit Hold'em	771	Andrew Hinrichsen (1/1)	€148,030	Gianluca Speranza	Results	
3	€5,300 Pot Limit Omaha	180	Steve Billirakis (1/2)	€238,140	Michele Di Lauro	Results	
4	€3,200 No Limit Hold'em Shootout	258	Tristan Wade (1/1)	€182,048	Michael Watson	Results	
5	€10,400 No Limit Hold'em (Split Format)	125	Michael Mizrachi (1/2)	€336,008	Shawn Buchanan	Results	
6	€1,620 Six-Handed Pot Limit Omaha	339	Philippe Boucher (1/1)	€124,584	Michel Dattani	Results	
7	€10,400 WSOPE Main Event Championship	593	Elio Fox (1/1)	€1,400,000	Chris Moorman	Results	

== Main Event ==
The 2011 World Series of Poker Europe Main Event ran from 15–20 October. The event drew 593 entrants, creating a prize pool of €5,692,800. The top 64 players made the money, with the winner earning €1,400,000.

=== Final table ===
Name	Number of chips (percentage of total)	WSOP Bracelets	WSOP Cashes*	WSOP Earnings*
(United States) Elio Fox	3,990,000 (22.4%)	0	0	0
(United Kingdom) Jake Cody	2,685,000 (15.1%)	1	3	$875,786
(Republic of Ireland) Dermot Blain	2,405,000 (13.5%)	0	2	$9,053
(United Kingdom) Chris Moorman	2,230,000 (12.5%)	0	12	$1,129,832
(United States) Brian Roberts	2,000,000 (11.2%)	0	4	$47,220
(United Kingdom) Max Silver	1,825,000 (10.2%)	0	1	$84,361
(Germany) Moritz Kranich	1,660,000 (9.3%)	0	0	0
(Canada) Shawn Buchanan	1,015,000 (5.7%)	0	26	$1,936,315

*-Career statistics before start of 2011 WSOPE Main Event

=== Final Table results ===
Place	Name	Prize
1st	Elio Fox (1/1)	€1,400,000
2nd	Chris Moorman	€800,000
3rd	Moritz Kranich	€550,000
4th	Brian Roberts	€400,000
5th	Dermot Blain	€275,000
6th	Shawn Buchanan	€200,000
7th	Jake Cody (1/1)	€150,000
8th	Max Silver	€115,000
