= Ruthenberg =

Ruthenberg is a German language habitational surname. Notable people with the name include:

- C. E. Ruthenberg (1882–1927), American Marxist politician
- Georg Ruthenberg (1959), American musician
- Sebastian Ruthenberg (1984), German professional poker player
- Trevor Ruthenberg (1968), Australian politician
