= Chris Moorman =

British poker player (born 1985)

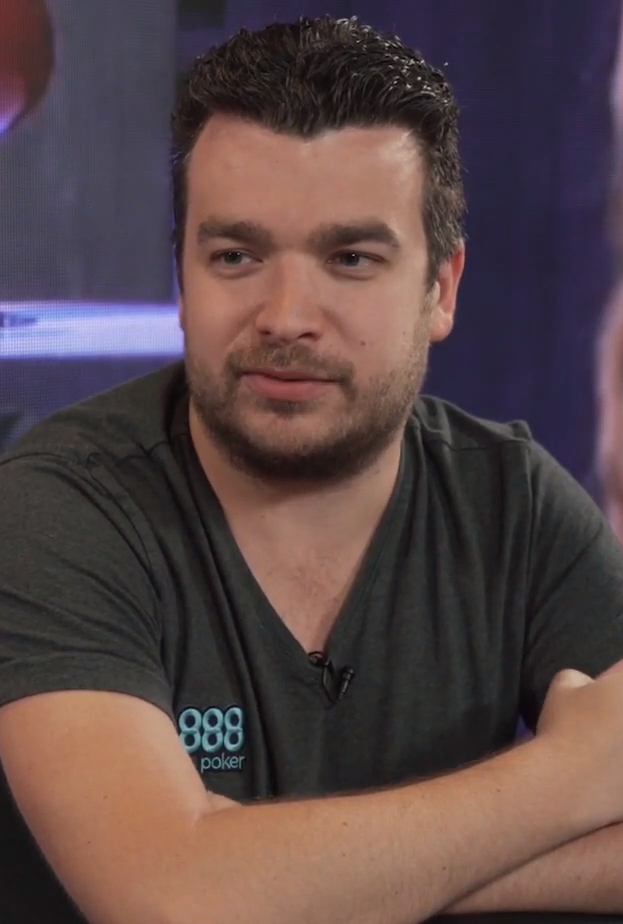
- Moorman in 2019
- Nicknames: Moorman1 (PokerStars, Full Tilt); 888moorman (888poker); Moorman1 (Bodog & Party Poker); INYOUREYE111 (Absolute Poker)
- Born: 12 July 1985 (age 41); Essex, UK

World Series of Poker
- Bracelets: 2
- Final tables: 8
- Money finishes: 82
- Highest WSOP Main Event finish: 273rd, 2018

World Poker Tour
- Title: 1
- Final table: 1
- Money finishes: 3

European Poker Tour
- Final table: 1
- Money finishes: 3

Chris Moorman (born 12 July 1985) is a British professional poker player. As of August 2017, he is the all-time leader in career online poker tournament earnings crossing the $14 million mark.

== Career ==
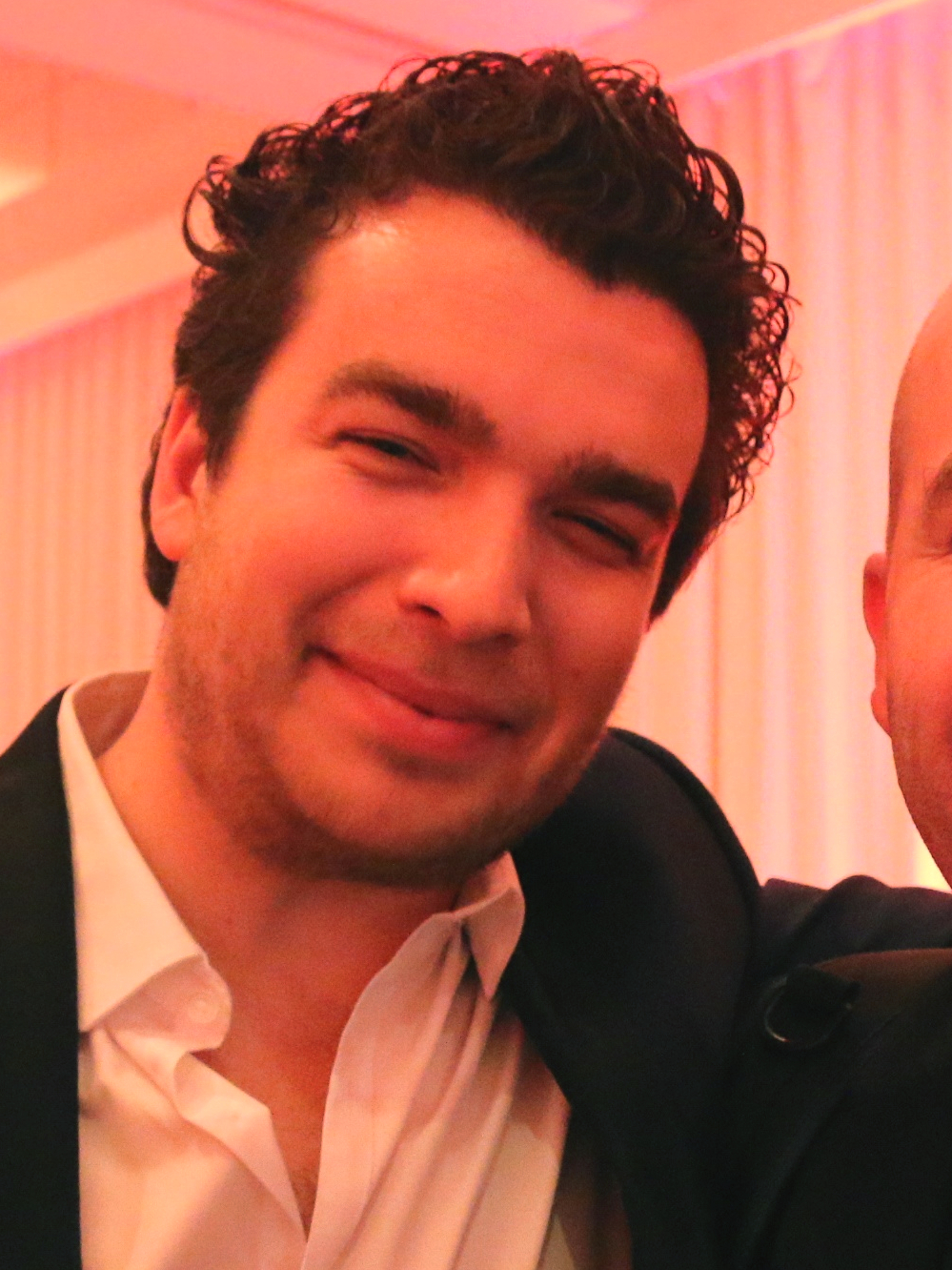
Moorman in 2015

He was among the leaders in the 2011 World Series of Poker Player of the Year point standings. If he had won the 2011 World Series of Poker Europe main event (he finished second), he would have taken the lead in the Player of the Year race with only the November Nine play remaining, which would have forced Player of the Year Ben Lamb to place 4th or higher to retake the lead. Chris Moorman won his first WSOP bracelet in the $3,000 NLH 6-handed event during the 2017 series. Four of his WSOP in the money finishes were in $10,000 or €10,000 championship events. Five of his twelve WSOP in the money finishes have been in six-handed events and another was in the eight-handed 2011 World Series of Poker Europe main event. He also has a final table appearance at an Aussie Millions Poker Championship main event. Prior to 2011, he was primarily an online poker player. His career online winnings exceed $7 million, while more than $1 million of his $1.3 million in live earnings have come in 2011. As of 1 July 2011, his largest online prizes and his largest live game prizes have been from non-win final table appearances. He has been ranked the no.1 online tournament player in the world on several occasions and is currently the most successful online tournament player in terms of overall winnings as of September 2013. He plays online as "Moorman1" at PokerStars, Full Tilt Poker, Ultimate Bet, Party Poker and Bodog.

His first WSOP cash was a 124th-place finish in the 2008 1593-player $2,000 No-Limit Hold'em Event 7 for a prize of $4,056. All seven of his WSOP in the money finishes before 2011 were in no limit Texas hold 'em events. Prior to his 7th-place finish in the 721-player A$10,000 2011 Aussie Millions Main event for a prize of A$175,000 (approximately US$174,000), his largest live prize was a 15th-place finish in the 2010 WSOP 256-player $10,000 Heads Up No-Limit Hold'em Championship (256 player max) Event 35 for a prize of $38,424. At the 2011 WSOP Europe, he established a career best prize with a second-place finish in the 593-player 8-handed €10,400 on 15–20 October 2011 WSOPE Main Event Championship for a prize of €800,000 ($1,101,520) at a final table that included Jake Cody, Elio Fox and Shawn Buchanan.

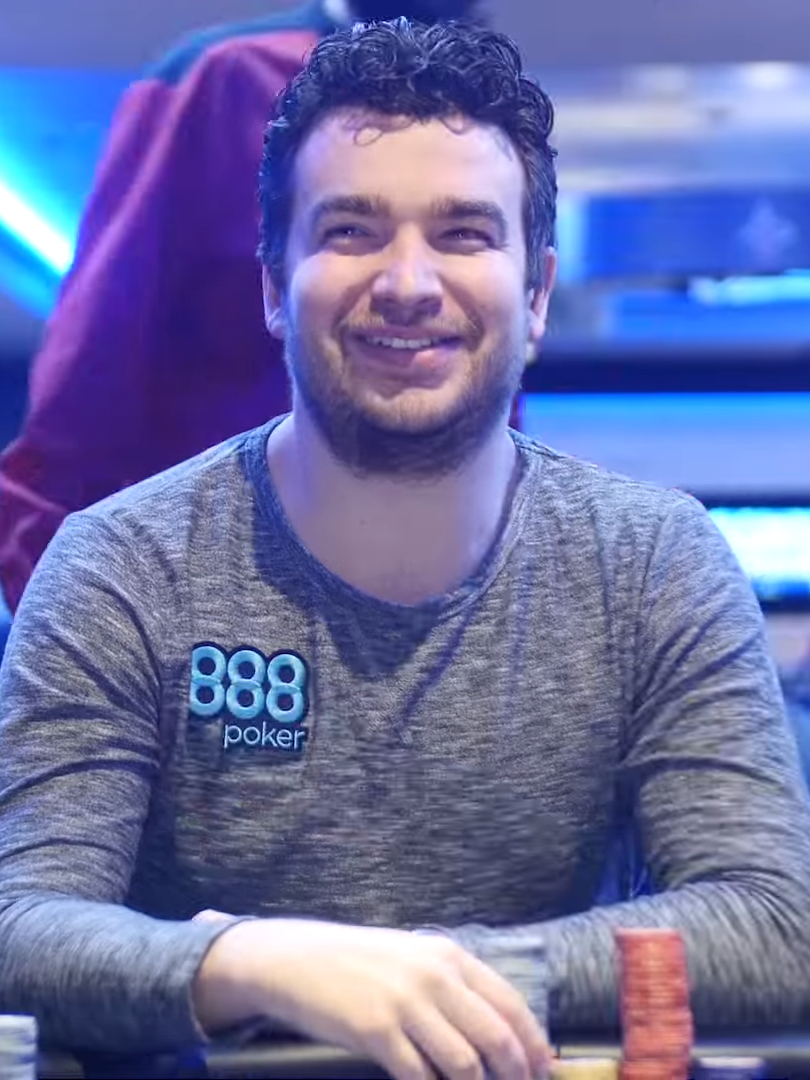
Moorman in 2018

As of November 2013, his $10.2 million career earnings stood as the highest all-time online career total. His largest payout was $235,592 for a 3rd-place finish in the 2404-player $1000+60 on 28–29 March 2011 Full Tilt Poker – $1K Monday $2 Million Tournament. His largest online wins were the 2,700-player $240+16 on 14 March 2010 Full Tilt Poker – The Sunday Brawl for $109,620 and the 20-player $5000+200 on 9 March 2008 winner-take-all PokerStars – Sunday $5,200 Freezeout for $100,000.

As of June 2016 he became a poker ambassador and team member of Team 888poker.

In 2018, Chris Moorman crossed the symbolic milestone of $15 million in online earnings. He also holds the all-time record for most online "Triple Crowns" with 29. This award is given to any player on Pocket Fives who can win three tournaments across three different networks with a $10,000 or above prize pool, in the space of a week.

== World Series of Poker ==
WSOP RESULTS LIFETIME
TOUR	TOTAL CASHES	TOTAL EARNINGS
WSOP VEGAS	35	$1,840,601
WSOP EUROPE	2	$1,134,988

WSOP RESULTS BY YEAR
Year	Cashes	Final Tables	Bracelets
2008	2		
2009	1		
2010	3		
2010 E	1	1	
2011	5	2	
2011 E	1		
2012	3		
2013	4	1	
2014	1		
2015	3		
2016	3		
2017	9	1	1

=== World Series of Poker bracelets ===
Year	Tournament	Prize (US$)
2017	$3,000 No Limit Hold'em 6-Handed	$498,682
2021 O	$800 No Limit Hold'em Turbo Deepstack Championship	$102,406

== Personal ==
Moorman has an economics degree from Essex University.
