= Tristan Wade =

American poker player

- Nicknames: Cre8ive (Full Tilt Poker and PokerStars)
- Born: 1984-1985; Boynton Beach, Florida

World Series of Poker
- Bracelet: 1
- Final tables: 5
- Money finishes: 39
- Highest WSOP Main Event finish: 113, 2010

World Poker Tour
- Money finishes: 3

European Poker Tour
- Money finish: 1

Tristan Wade is an American professional poker player from Boynton Beach, Florida. He won his first World Series of Poker bracelet at the 2011 World Series of Poker Europe. In addition to a bracelet, 2011 saw Wade earn his first 3 World Series of Poker (WSOP) final tables, with two at the summer 2011 World Series of Poker before his fall bracelet in Europe. He's known for limping the button then calling off 30bb shoves with 22 like a boss. Wade is also an instructor at Deepstacks University. Wade is an alumnus of University of Central Florida where he earned a Bachelor of Science degree in psychology. WSOP.com lists him as a resident of Boynton Beach, Florida, while Hendon mob claims he is from Orlando, Florida. Wade made his first trip to Europe at the age of 26 in 2011 because of Black Friday, which had limited his options for play in the United States.

== Career ==
Wade's first professional live game tournament in the money finish was 25th-place in Event 3 at the 2007 World Series of Poker (WSOP), for a prize of $23,735.

His largest online tournament payouts have been $47,500 for 3rd in a February 2010 PokerStars $500 No Limit Hold'em event and $46,115 for 3rd in a July 2009 Full Tilt Poker $1,000 No Limit Hold'em event.

As of 2017, Wade's most successful tournament year was 2011, with tournament winnings of $757,841. This includes his largest single cash ($292,866), his first three WSOP final tables and his first WSOP win (see next section).

Wade has been a regular on the WPT Deepstacks (WPTDS) North American mid-major poker tour. In 2015, the second season of the series, Wade was WPTDS Player of the Year. Wade played at 14 of the 16 stops that season, cashing at seven of them, and finishing in the top 15 at four events.

== World Series of Poker ==
Wade's first WSOP final table was a seventh-place finish in Event #18 at the 2011 WSOP, cashing for $94,700.

Wade scored his largest WSOP and largest ever tournament cash a few weeks later, winning $292,866 with his fourth-place finish in Event #46 at the 2011 WSOP.

A few months later, 2011 continued to be a year of WSOP firsts for Wade, as he won his first WSOP bracelet in Event #4 at the 2011 WSOP Europe, for a prize of €182,048 (US$243,191).

World Series of Poker bracelets
Year	Tournament	Prize (US$)
2011E	€3,200 No Limit Hold 'em Shootout	€182,048

An "E" following a year denotes bracelet(s) won at the World Series of Poker Europe

World Series of Poker results
Year	Cashes	Final Tables	Bracelets
2007	1		
2008	3		
2009	1		
2010	4		
2011	2	2	
2011 E	2	1	1
2012	4	1	
2012 E	1		
2013	1		
2014	2		
2015	3	1	
2016	5		
2017	3		
2018	7		
2019	2		
2021	5		
2022	5		
