= Andreas Høivold =

Norwegian poker player (1972–2026)

- Nickname: Tegneseriesamleren
- Born: 19 October 1972; Sunderland, England
- Died: 17 June 2026 (aged 53); Kristiansand, Norway

World Series of Poker
- Bracelet: None
- Money finishes: 21
- Highest WSOP Main Event finish: None

World Poker Tour
- Money finish: 1

European Poker Tour
- Title: 1
- Final table: 1
- Money finishes: 6

Andreas Høivold (19 October 1972 – 17 June 2026) was a Norwegian professional poker player. He moved to Oslo in 1974, then moved a year after to Kristiansand where he lived until 2009 when he moved to Las Vegas, where he stayed for five years before moving back to Norway.

Høivold became famous when he came 3rd in Poker Million V in 2006, despite having turned professional only seven months prior. He since won an EPT event in Dortmund, for which he won €672,000.

He cashed 21 times in the World Series of Poker, with total earnings of just over $127,000.

Ladbrokes signed him up after his 3rd-place finish in Poker Million V, but the sponsorship ended in 2009.

Høivold stated his poker idols are Phil Ivey, Doyle Brunson, and fellow Scandinavian Gus Hansen, who he said are the players he respected the most.

He also appeared in the opening episodes of High Stakes Poker season six.

As of 2013, his total live tournament winnings exceed $1,700,000.

Høivold died from organ failure on 17 June 2026, at the age of 53.
