= William Thorson =

Swedish poker player

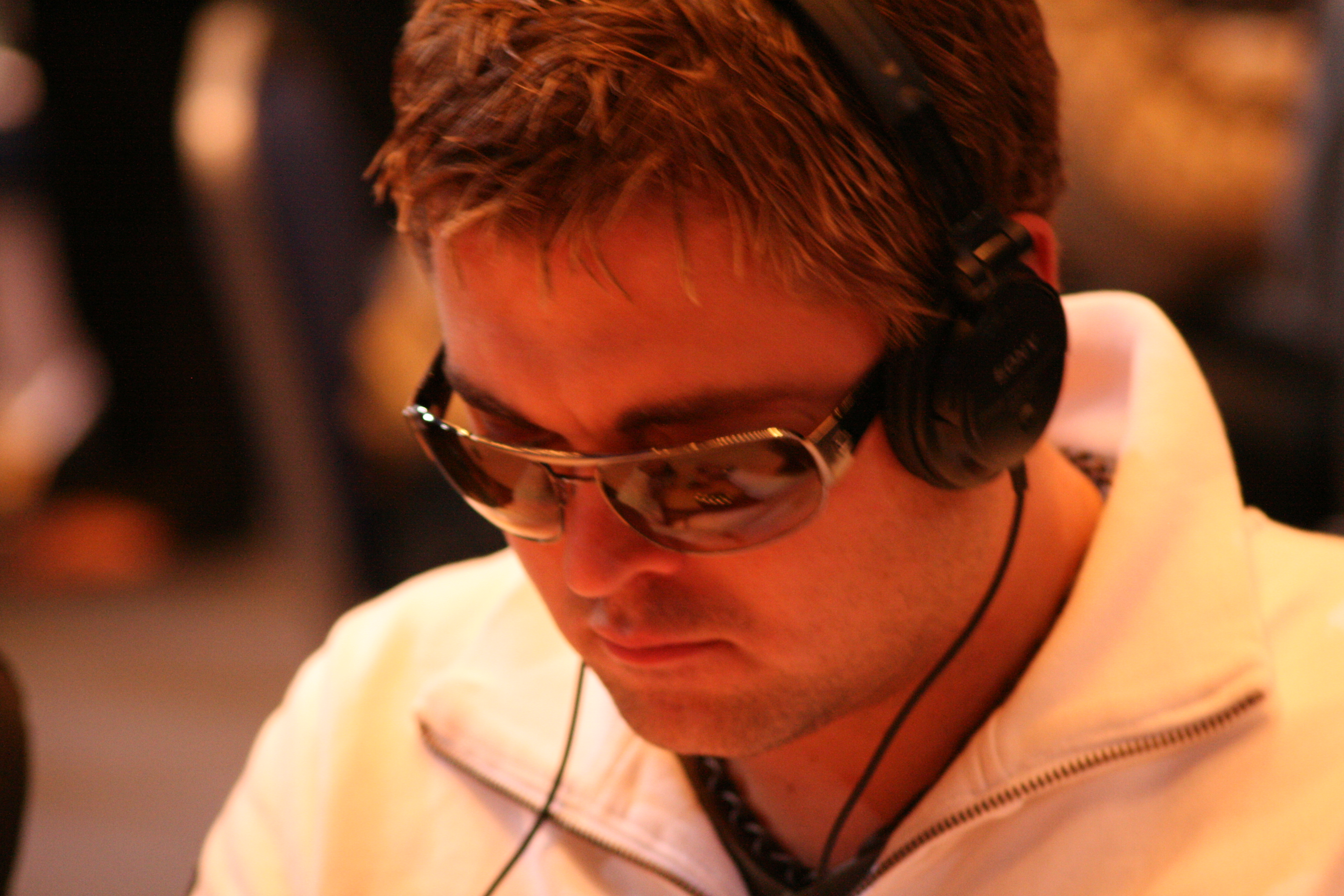
- Thorson at EPT Grand Final, Monte Carlo, 2008
- Born: c. 1983 (age 42–43); Varberg, Sweden

World Series of Poker
- Money finishes: 4
- Highest WSOP Main Event finish: 13th, 2006

World Poker Tour
- Money finishes: 2

European Poker Tour
- Final tables: 3
- Money finishes: 4

William Thorson (born c. 1983) is a Swedish professional poker player from Varberg, Sweden and a three time European Poker Tour (EPT) final table participant who, in the 2006 World Series of Poker (WSOP) Main Event, finished in 13th place.

In 2012, Thorson disappeared from the poker scene. In 2014, it was publicly confirmed that Thorson found a job at the Casa Blanca club in Barcelona, leaving poker behind. He is now a practicing Muslim.

== Poker ==
=== World Series of Poker ===
Thorson has cashed four times at the World Series of Poker, most notably finishing in 13th place at the 2006 World Series of Poker Main Event earning $907,128. The next year at the 2007 World Series of Poker $5,000 World Championship Limit Hold'em event, Thorson finished 3rd earning $136,493, a tournament that was eventually won by Saro Getzoyan. Three years later at the 2010 World Series of Poker Main Event, Thorson finished in 22nd place earning $317,161.

=== European Poker Tour ===
Thorson has made three final tables at the European Poker Tour, his first was at the EPT Dublin season three finishing 3rd for €184,780 ($232,340). He reached a second final table at the EPT San Remo season four, finishing 6th for €140,600, and a third at the EPT Dortmund season five, finishing 7th, earning €116,500. In addition he nearly made another final table coming in 9th at the PokerStars Caribbean Adventure season four, earning $120,000.

As of 2010, his total live tournament winnings exceed $2,425,000. His four cashes at the WSOP account for $1,052,884 of those winnings.

=== Top places in tournaments ===
Event	Place	Winning	Year
Pokerstars.com Baltic Festival	1st	$115,942	2010
NAPT Caribbean Poker Adventure PokerStars EPT/ Season 6 LAPT/ Season 3	1st	$72,465	2010
London Open PokerStars EPT/Season 6	1st	$85,342	2009
Spring Poker Week	2nd	$8,619	2008
38th Annual World Series of Poker	3rd	$136,493	2007
The Irish Winter Tour PokerStars EPT/Season 3	3rd	$242,176	2006
Showdown Poker Tour	2nd	$56,619	2006
