= Steve Billirakis =

American poker player (born 1986)

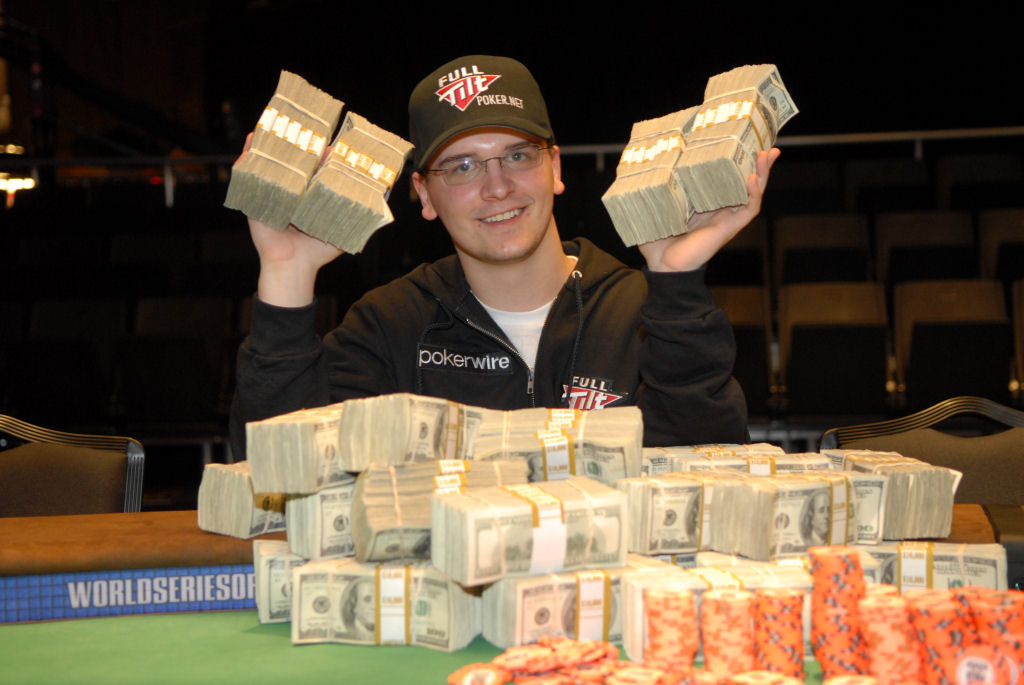
- Billirakis after his win at the 2007 World Series of Poker
- Nickname: MrSmokey1

World Series of Poker
- Bracelets: 2
- Money finishes: 26
- Highest WSOP Main Event finish: 199rd, 2008

World Poker Tour
- Title: None
- Final table: None
- Money finishes: 5

Steve Billirakis (born May 23, 1986) is an American professional poker player. He was born in Hampshire, Illinois.

Billirakis won the first tournament of the 2007 World Series of Poker winning the $5,000 World Championship Mixed Hold'em Limit/No-Limit event after beating Canadian poker player and former professional hockey player Greg Mueller heads-up. Billirakis won $536,287 and became the then youngest WSOP bracelet winner in history, having won the event only 11 days after his 21st birthday. The previous record holder was Jeff Madsen, who had set the record only the year before. Billirakis' record was broken on September 10, 2007 when Annette Obrestad won the main event of the World Series of Poker Europe where the age limit was only 18 years. Prior to signing up for this mixed hold'em event, Billirakis had never played limit hold'em. His friends gave him a crash course in the days leading up to the event.

On one key hand when they were heads up, Mueller had made top pair against Billirakis's trips. When Billirakis raised on the river, Mueller made a feint of putting chips into the pot to attempt to get a read on whether Billirakis wanted him to call. While not a formal breach of the rules, ESPN commentator Norman Chad opined that such plays "ain't kosher" according to poker etiquette. A short-stacked Mueller later called the big blind with 5♦ 4♦. Billirakis raised Mueller all-in with K♠ 2♦. The board came down J♦ Q♥ 2♠ 8♥ Q♠, giving Billirakis the winning hand with two pair queens and deuces.

In November 2008, Billirakis won a WSOP Circuit Event - Horseshoe Hammond, $5,150 Championship, earning $208,885. He won his second bracelet in the 2011 WSOP Europe in a Pot Limit Omaha event.

As of 2014, Billirakis's total live tournament winnings exceed $2,625,000. His 21 cashes at the WSOP account for $1,675,026 of those winnings.

== World Series of Poker bracelets ==
Year	Event	Prize Money
2007	$5,000 World Championship Mixed Hold'em (Limit/No-Limit)	$536,287
2011E	€5,300 Pot Limit Omaha (WSOPE)	€238,140 ($328,752)

An "E" following a year denotes bracelet(s) won at the World Series of Poker Europe
