= Katja Thater =

German poker player (born 1966)

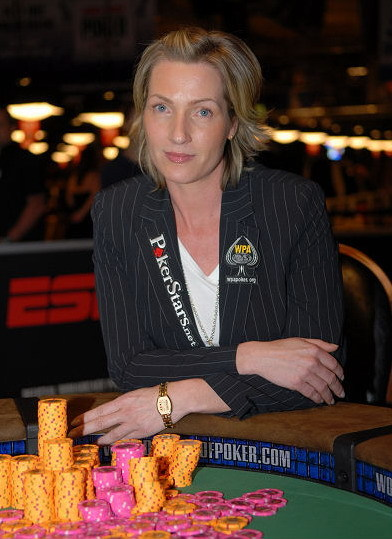
- Thater in the 2007 World Series of Poker
- Nicknames: Miss Slick, Lady Horror
- Born: 14 July 1966 (age 60); Hamburg, Germany

World Series of Poker
- Bracelet: 1
- Final tables: 2
- Money finishes: 6
- Highest WSOP Main Event finish: None

European Poker Tour
- Title: None
- Final table: 1
- Money finishes: 2

Katja Thater (German pronunciation: [ˈkatja ˈtaːtɐ]; born 14 July 1966 in Hamburg) is a German professional poker player and horse breeder. She is married to another poker professional, Jan von Halle.

Her popularity in Germany comes from the wide coverage on local television of her participation in the Poker Nations Cup and Women's Poker Open.

Before becoming a professional poker player, Thater was the director of an event and marketing company in Hamburg and competed in dressage tournaments at horse shows. She continues competing in her spare time.

Thater represented Germany as a member of the national team in the 2006 Poker Nations Cup in Cardiff, participated in the Women's Poker Open in London. She was also a member of PokerStars Team Pro.

She won her first World Series of Poker bracelet in 2007 in the $1,500 Razz event. Other major tournament finishes include fourth place in the 2002 Austrian Classics and fifth place in the $1,000 World Championship Ladies no limit Texas hold 'em event in 2007. In 2010, she won a $1,000 buy-in 8-Game Mix Event at the PokerStars Caribbean Adventure in the Bahamas for over $10,000. In 2016, Thater continued her success at the PokerStars Caribbean Adventure, finishing second to Donald McCalmont in the $1,100 7-Card Stud Hi/Lo Split Eight-or-Better event.

As of 2010, Thater's total live tournament winnings exceed $350,000.
