= Kristian Kjøndal =

Norwegian poker player (born 1985)

- Nickname: Pokerkong1
- Born: 1985 (age 40–41); Larvik, Norway

World Series of Poker
- Bracelet: None
- Money finish: 1
- Highest WSOP Main Event finish: None

European Poker Tour
- Title: None
- Final tables: 3
- Money finishes: 4

Kristian Kjøndal (born 1985 in Larvik, Norway) is a Norwegian poker player, who came in fourth in the season 3 EPT grand final. He is also an internet player known as "Kris85" on the Prima Poker network or "Pokerkong1" on Full Tilt Poker. Kjøndal is a high-stakes internet poker player, often playing in $40,000 No Limit Hold'em games.

As of 2022, his total live tournament winnings exceed $1,000,000.
