= Gavin Griffin =

American poker player (born 1981)

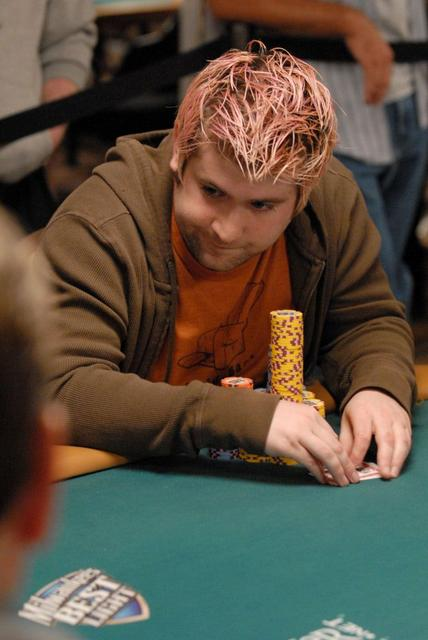
- Griffin at the 2007 World Series of Poker
- Born: August 28, 1981 (age 45); Darien, Illinois, U.S.

World Series of Poker
- Bracelet: 1
- Money finishes: 10
- Highest WSOP Main Event finish: 505th, 2016

World Poker Tour
- Title: 1
- Final table: 1
- Money finishes: 2

European Poker Tour
- Title: 1
- Final table: 1
- Money finish: 1

Gavin Griffin (born August 28, 1981, in Darien, Illinois) is an American professional poker player. He attended Texas Christian University in Fort Worth, Texas.

Starting as an internet poker player he successfully made the transition to live poker, and broke Allen Cunningham's record as the youngest person ever to win a World Series of Poker title in 2004, winning a $3,000 Pot Limit Texas hold'em event. Griffin lost that record the following World Series to Eric Froehlich.

In 2007, he won the Grand Final of the European Poker Tour in Monte Carlo, after qualifying via a $240 online satellite tournament on PokerStars.com. His victory paid him €1,825,010 ($2,434,061) which pushed him to the top of the all-time European Poker Tour winnings list.

Other achievements include finishing 3rd in a World Series of Poker Circuit Event at Harrah's Rincon in San Diego and finishing 7th at the 2007 World Series of Poker Pot Limit Hold'em Championship at the Rio in Las Vegas.

In 2008 Griffin won the Borgata Winter Open, his first World Poker Tour title. With the win, he was the first player to have won a WSOP bracelet, an EPT event, and a WPT event. Only four other players, Roland De Wolfe, Jake Cody, Davidi Kitai, and Bertrand Grospellier, have won a title in each of these three tournaments since Griffin accomplished the feat.

As of 2012, his total live tournament winnings exceed $4,800,000. His 10 cashes at the WSOP account for $442,255 of those winnings.

Griffin has been active in breast cancer awareness. He won the EPT Monte Carlo with pink hair for this cause. Griffin also walked in the September 2007 and September 2009 Avon Walk for Breast Cancer in Long Beach, California with teammates and fiancée Amy Roberts. He credits much of his success to the support of his friends, family and fiancée.

== World Series of Poker bracelets ==
Year	Tournament	Prize (US$)
2004	$3,000 Pot Limit Hold'em	$270,420
