= ElkY =

French poker player and electronic sports player

Bertrand Grospellier
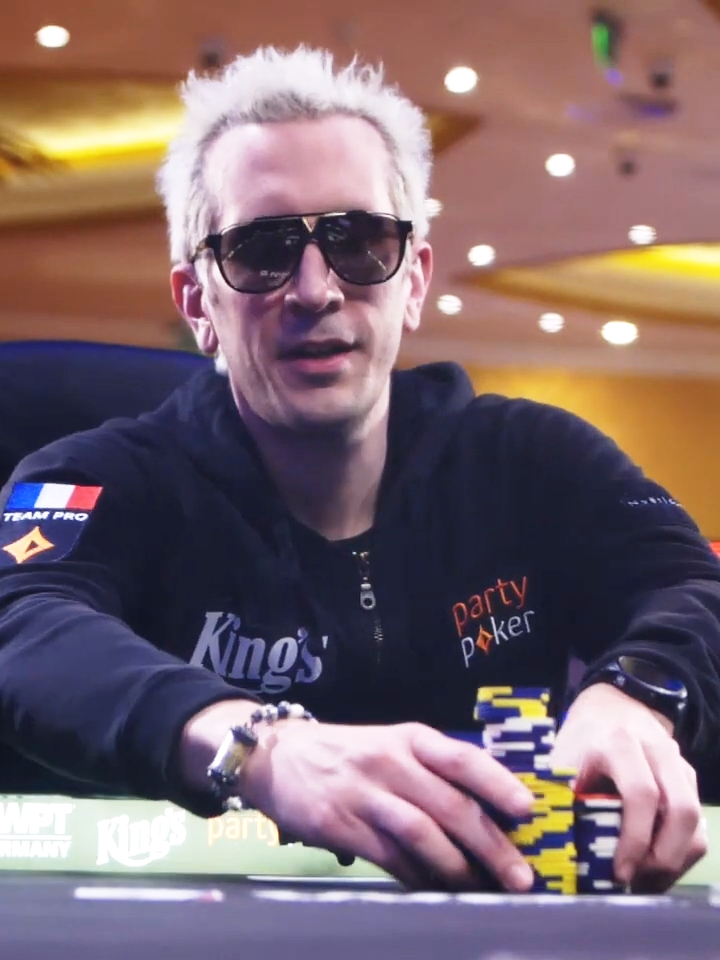
- ElkY at King's Casino Rozvadov in 2020
- Nickname: ElkY
- Born: 8 February 1981 (age 45); Melun, France

World Series of Poker
- Bracelets: 2
- Final tables: 6
- Money finishes: 47
- Highest WSOP Main Event finish: 122nd, 2009

World Poker Tour
- Title: 1
- Final tables: 2
- Money finishes: 5

European Poker Tour
- Title: 1
- Final tables: 2
- Money finishes: 18
Personal info
- Race: Terran/Zerg; Tournaments/Cash Games

Current team
- Team: Team Liquid
- Game: Hearthstone

Esports career information
- Games: StarCraft: Brood War; Warcraft III; Hearthstone

Career highlights and awards
- Euro Cyber Games champion (2003)

Bertrand Grospellier (French pronunciation: [bɛʁtʁɑ̃ ɡʁopɛlje]; born 8 February 1981 in Melun), also known as ElkY /ˈɛlki/, is a French poker player and former StarCraft: Brood War and Warcraft III esports player. As of February 2025, his total live poker earnings exceeds $15.4 million. He has won two World Series of Poker bracelets.

He has won a World Poker Tour (WPT), a World Series of Poker (WSOP) bracelet and a European Poker Tour (EPT) title, giving him the Triple Crown. He is a PartyPoker Pro, and he currently resides in Prague, Czech Republic, as of 2024. ElkY maintained the number-one rank on the Global Poker Index for 18 weeks between July 2011 and October 2012. In November 2015, ElkY returned to the esports scene by joining Team Liquid as a Hearthstone player.

== StarCraft and WarCraft III ==
ElkY was one of the top-ranked StarCraft players in the world, having placed second in the World Cyber Games in 2001 and continuing his career in South Korea for a few years subsequent, including a fourth-place finish in an Ongamenet Starleague. By 2002, he picked up the newly released WarCraft III: Reign of Chaos and garnered success by finishing second in the televised Ongamenet WarCraft Retail League before retiring.

=== Accomplishments ===
- 3rd – StarCraft: Brood War, KBK Jeju, 2001 (Seoul, South Korea)
- 2nd – StarCraft: Brood War, World Cyber Games 2001 (Seoul, South Korea)
- 4th – StarCraft: Brood War, World Cyber Games 2002 (Daejeon, South Korea)
- 4th – StarCraft: Brood War, SKY 2 Ongamenet Starleague, 2002 (Seoul, South Korea)
- 2nd – WarCraft III: Reign of Chaos, Ongamenet WarCraft Retail League, 2002 (Seoul, South Korea)
- 1st – StarCraft: Brood War, Euro Cyber Games 2003 (Paris, France)
- Round 8 – StarCraft: Brood War, World Cyber Games 2003 (Seoul, South Korea)
- Round 16 – StarCraft: Brood War, World Cyber Games 2004 (San Francisco, California, United States)

== Poker career ==
ElkY turned his attention to professional poker from 2004 to 2005, where he became a full-time poker pro. ElkY was a member of Team PokerStars. He was the first person to reach "Supernova" and "Supernova Elite" statuses on PokerStars, having earned 100,000 and 1,000,000 player points in 2 weeks, and 4 1/2 months, respectively.

=== Accomplishments ===
He set the Guinness World Record for most Single Table Sit & Goes played in one hour for a total of 62 at a $6.50 buy-in with a profit of $23.60. In addition to playing a high number of simultaneous tournaments, he has transferred well to live tournaments and cash games.

=== European Poker Tour ===
On Saturday, 20 January 2007, he finished second in the Copenhagen event on the European Poker Tour for €309,000. In January 2008, ElkY finished in 1st place, winning $2,000,000 at the European Poker Tour's (EPT) PokerStars Caribbean Poker Adventure. A year later, while being knocked out of the main event of the PokerStars Caribbean Poker Adventure on day 1, ElkY went on to take home the EPT5 $25,000 buy-in "High Roller" side event for $433,500.

=== World Poker Tour ===
In October 2008, ElkY added to his tournament haul by winning the World Poker Tour's Festa al Lago tournament, claiming a $1.4 million first prize. The win marked ElkY's first-ever cash on the WPT. He also became just the third person, along with Roland De Wolfe and Gavin Griffin, to win a title on both the WPT and EPT. As a result of his success on the seventh season of the World Poker Tour, ElkY was awarded the distinction of "WPT Player of the Year.

World Poker Tour Titles
Year	Tournament	Prize (US$)
2008	$15,000 Festa al Lago	$1,411,015

=== World Championship of Online Poker ===
ElkY was disqualified from event 29 in the 2008 World Championship of Online Poker (WCOOP) for agreeing to go all-in blind with another player. This violated the tournament rule which states "Poker is an individual (not a team) game. Any action or chat intended to help another player is unethical and is prohibited." His winnings were forfeited and other places were moved up in the standings to replace his finish. Two other players (Annette_15 and charder30) had also violated the same rule earlier.

On 18 September 2009, ElkY won his first WCOOP bracelet in event 38. He added a second bracelet only three days later in Event 43 by besting a field of 9,220 entrants. His winnings for both events totalled nearly $500,000.

World Championship of Online Poker Titles
Year	Event	Tournament	Prize (US$)
2009	Event 38	$530 No Limit Hold’em 1R1A	$232,730
2009	Event 43	$215 No Limit Hold’em	$263,323

Spring Championship of Online Poker Titles

Year	Event	Tournament	Prize(US$)
2011	Event 35	$25,000 Heads-Up NLHE	$112,500

=== World Series of Poker ===
ElkY won his first WSOP bracelet in the 2011 Seven Card Stud Championship, overcoming a field of 126 to collect $331,639 in prize money. This win made ElkY only the fourth player to win a WPT, EPT and WSOP title.

ElkY won his second bracelet in the 2019 WSOPE, winning the $550 Colossus No-limit Hold'em event.

World Series of Poker
Year	Tournament	Prize
2011	$10,000 Seven Card Stud Championship	$331,639
2019E	€550 Colossus No-Limit Hold’em	€191,172

An "E" following a year denotes bracelet(s) won at the World Series of Poker Europe

=== Career earnings ===
As of February 2025, his total live poker earnings exceeds $15.4 million.

== Charity ==
Today, ElkY is a member of the "Champions for Peace" club, a group of 54 famous elite athletes committed to serving peace in the world through sport, created by Peace and Sport, a Monaco-based international organization.

== Hearthstone ==
In November 2015, Elky returned to the esports scene by joining Team Liquid as a Hearthstone player.
