= Mike Watson (poker player) =

Canadian poker player (born 1984)

Michael Watson
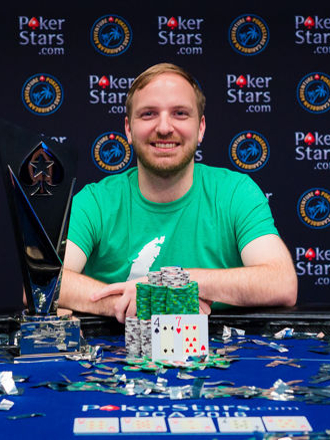
- Watson in 2016
- Nicknames: SirWatts, SirBusket
- Born: 1984 (age 41–42)

World Series of Poker
- Bracelet: 1
- Final tables: 25
- Money finishes: 88
- Highest WSOP Main Event finish: 589th, 2013

World Poker Tour
- Title: 1
- Final tables: 6
- Money finishes: 13

European Poker Tour
- Titles: 2
- Final tables: 20
- Money finishes: 41

Michael Watson (born 1984) is a Canadian professional online poker player from St. John's, Newfoundland and Labrador who won a World Poker Tour title in July 2008. He also finished 2nd in the $1,500 No Limit Hold'em – Mixed Max (Event #58) of the 2014 World Series of Poker.

On July 11, 2014, Mike Watson is ranked #24 on the Global poker index (he ranked as high as #2 in June 2013) As of 2023, his total live tournament winnings exceed $20,700,000.

Watson is one of only 10 players to achieve a Triple Crown, which he completed in July 2024.

== World Poker Tour ==
Watson was the winner of the World Poker Tour (WPT) Bellagio Cup IV, in A final table made up of Gabriel Thaler, John Phan, Ralph Perry, fellow professional online poker player Luke "IWEARGOGGLES" Staudenmaier and David Benyamine who Watson defeated during heads-up play to take the title, and $1,673,770.

== European Poker Tour ==
Watson finished 3rd in 2008 EPT London High Roller Showdown, taking home $422,750. The final table included notable professionals Jason Mercier, John Juanda, Scotty Nguyen, David Benyamine, and Isabelle Mercier.

He won the PokerStars Caribbean Adventure in 2016 for over $700,000.

In 2023, Watson won the main event at EPT Monte Carlo for €749,425, becoming the third ever person to win two EPT main events.

== World Series of Poker ==
Watson secured his first ever WSOP bracelet on July 8, 2024 after winning the $1,000 No-Limit Hold 'Em 6-Max Online Championship. The win made him the 10th person to achieve a Triple Crown, having previously won titles in both the WPT and EPT.

In addition to a bracelet, Watson has accumulated 88 cashes and 25 final tables in WSOP events worth a combined $3,792,962 in earnings.
