= Sebastian Ruthenberg =

German poker player (born 1984)

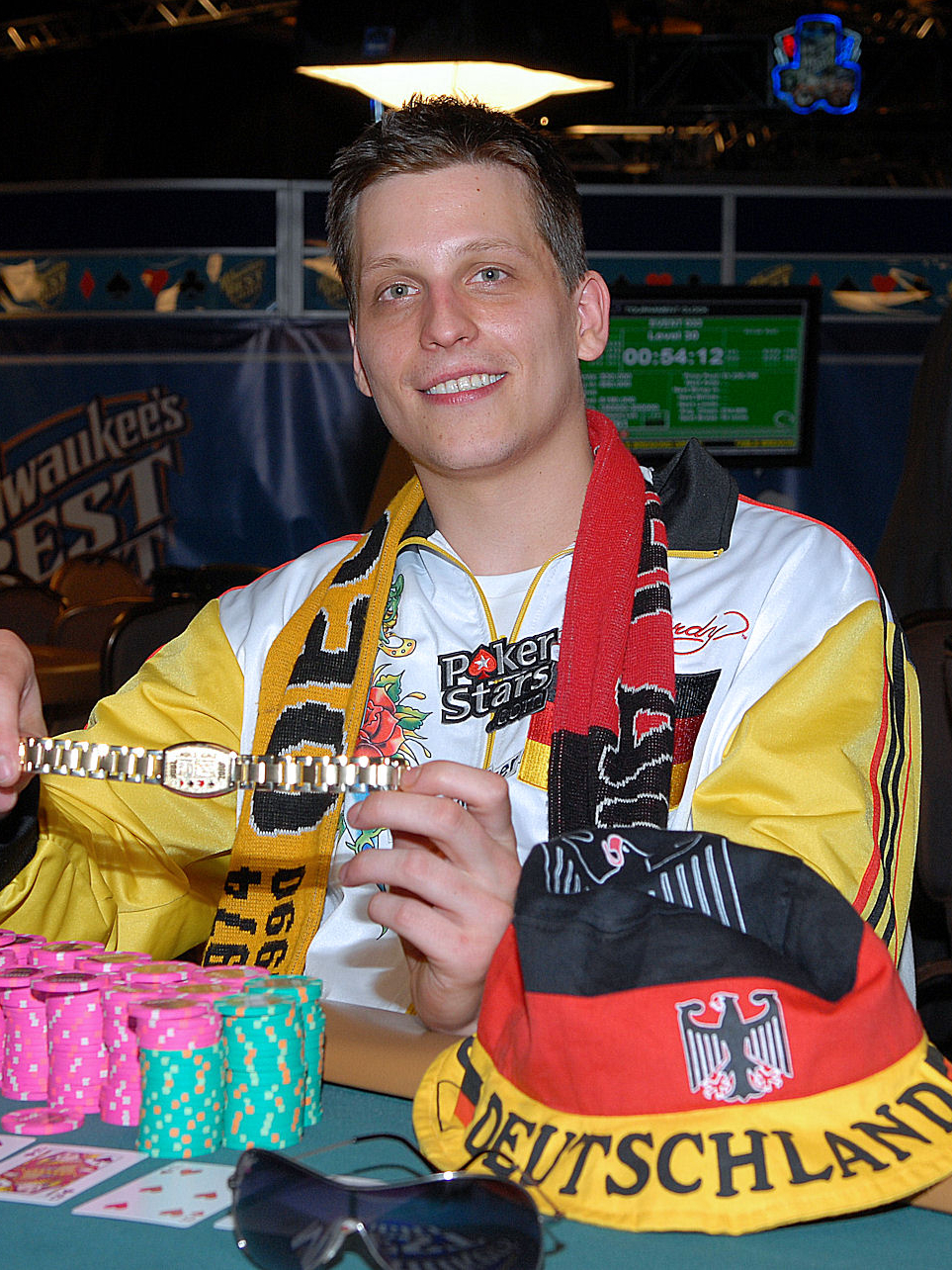
- Ruthenberg after winning the $5,000 Seven Card Stud Hi-Low World Championship in 2008
- Nickname: taktloss47
- Born: 6 February 1984 (age 42); Hamburg, Germany

World Series of Poker
- Bracelet: 1
- Money finishes: 6
- Highest WSOP Main Event finish: 55th, 2011

World Poker Tour
- Money finish: 1

European Poker Tour
- Title: 1
- Final tables: 2
- Money finishes: 8

Sebastian Ruthenberg (born 6 February 1984 in Hamburg) is a German professional poker player who is both a World Series of Poker bracelet and a European Poker Tour title winner.

== World Series of Poker ==
Ruthenberg has six cashes at the World Series of Poker, two of them were at the 2008 World Series of Poker, In his first cash he finished in 68th place in the $2,500 No Limit Hold'em event. In his second cash he won the $5,000 Seven Card Stud Hi-Low World Championship, the bracelet and $328,762 after defeating professional poker player Chris Ferguson during heads-up play.

=== World Series of Poker bracelets ===
Year	Event	Prize Money
2008	$5,000 Seven-Card Stud Hi-Low World Championship	$328,762

== European Poker Tour ==
Ruthenberg has cashed eight times at the European Poker Tour (EPT) and was the winner of fifth season of the 2008 PokerStars.com EPT Barcelona Open, earning €1,361,000 (US$1,941,401), but the last three Players decided to make a deal. He also made another final table earlier at the 2007 EPT Dortmund event earning €220,000 ($288,283) for third place. In December 2008 he nearly made another final table at fifth season EPT Prague where he finished in ninth place, earning €42,800.

As of 2011, his total live tournament winnings exceed $3,400,000.
