= Shawn Buchanan =

Canadian poker player (born 1982)

- Nickname: The Cannon
- Born: July 6, 1982 (age 44)

World Series of Poker
- Bracelet: 1
- Final tables: 10
- Money finishes: 57
- Highest WSOP Main Event finish: 404th, 2012

World Poker Tour
- Title: 1
- Final tables: 3
- Money finishes: 12

Shawn Buchanan (born July 6, 1982) is a Canadian poker player from Vancouver, British Columbia who won the World Poker Tour Mandalay Bay Poker Championship in 2007, earning $768,775.

As of 2023, his total live tournament winnings exceed $7,100,000. Buchanan has recorded dozens of cashes at the World Series of Poker (57 as of July 2019), including eight at the 2010 WSOP and nine at either the 2011 WSOP or the 2011 WSOP Europe. He was among the leaders in the 2011 World Series of Poker Player of the Year point standings.

In July 2019, Buchanan won his first WSOP bracelet in Event #76, the $800 WSOP.com Online No Limit Hold'em 6-Handed event, defeating a field of 1,560 entrants and beating two-time bracelet winner David "Bakes" Baker heads-up for $223,119. The win came after three earlier WSOP runner-up finishes, and he had 57 WSOP cashes and nearly $3 million in WSOP earnings at that point.

As of 2026, his recorded live tournament earnings total about $7.48 million from 219 cashes, which places him 14th on the Canadian all-time money list.

== Online poker ==
On September 28, 2007, Buchanan, who uses the name 'buck21' on PokerStars, won event #19 of the 2007 World Championship of Online Poker, a $530 buy-in Pot-limit Omaha tournament. Buchanan bested a field of 1,046 to win the $97,262.78 first prize.

== World Series of Poker bracelets ==
Year	Tournament	Prize (US$)
2019	$800 WSOP.com Online No Limit Hold'em 6-Handed	$223,119
2019	$800 WSOP.com Online No Limit Hold'em 6-Handed	$223,119
