= Jake Cody =

English poker player (born 1988)

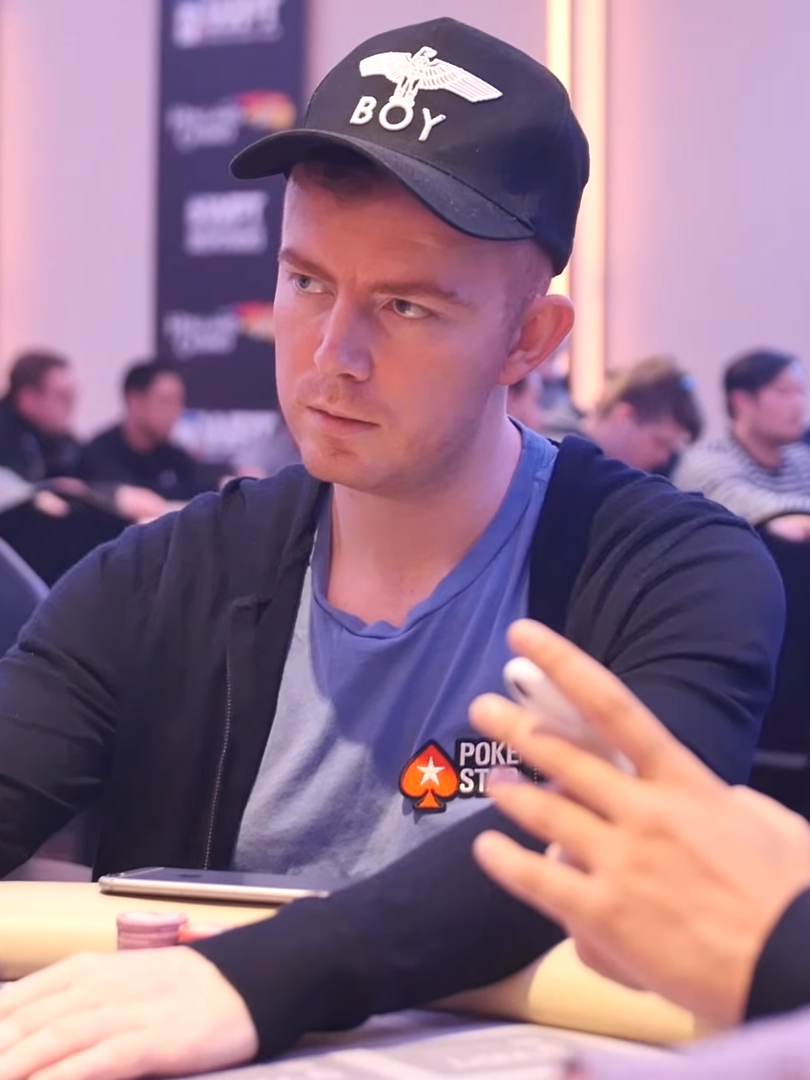
- Jake Cody in 2017
- Nicknames: neverbluff67 in Y0UR F4CE
- Born: 4 July 1988 (age 38)

World Series of Poker
- Bracelet: 1
- Final tables: 3
- Money finishes: 14
- Highest WSOP Main Event finish: 113th, 2015

World Poker Tour
- Title: 1
- Final table: 1
- Money finishes: 5

European Poker Tour
- Title: 1
- Final tables: 2
- Money finishes: 13

Jake Cody (born 4 July 1988) is a professional poker player from Rochdale, England, United Kingdom.

He entered the European tournament scene in 2010 with major wins at the European Poker Tour event in Deauville in January where he won €857,000 and the main event of the World Poker Tour London in August where he pocketed a further £273,783.

== Career ==
Cody revealed in an interview with Bluff Europe magazine that he started his online career by depositing just $10 and has not made a further deposit since. The Rochdale native was studying psychology at university before giving up his studies to play poker professionally, a decision that didn't initially sit well with his parents. He puts his success down to hard work, regularly playing 12 hours days and constantly reading about poker, posting on forums and discussing hands and strategy with fellow players, something he says is crucial to developing as a player.

He enjoyed his first minor tournament success with a small cash in the Grosvenor UK Poker Tour side event in Manchester in April 2009 and also made the money in the maiden UK and Ireland Poker Tour (UKIPT) event in Galway in December 2009. Cody's professional career really took off a month later when the youngster outlasted a field of 768-runners to take the €5,000 EPT Deauville Main Event for a massive €857,000 pay day.

Cody had a relatively quiet time on the tournament circuit with a few small cashes at UKIPT events before completing the second part of poker's triple crown after winning the World Poker Tour event in London. Cody beat Sweden's Nichlas Mattsson heads up in the £5,000 buy-in event at the Palm Beach Casino to take home the £273,783 first prize.

Cody achievements were recognised by the judging panel of the European Poker Awards, where he was named the Poker Player of the Year and the Rookie of the Year. He was unable to attend the ceremony at the Aviation Club de France in Paris on 13 February as he was playing in the £1,500 High Roller tournament at the UKIPT event Nottingham. He beat a final table that included Dave 'Devilfish' Ulliott to take the title and the £34,200 first prize.

On 4 June 2011, Cody completed the triple crown by winning his first WSOP Bracelet. He defeated Yevgeniy Timoshenko to win the $25,000 Heads-Up No-Limit Hold'em event, only the second bracelet event in which Jake had played.

At the 2011 WSOPE, he made the final table at the Main Event and finished 7th, earning €150,000.

On 17 November 2011, Cody signed a sponsorship deal with online poker site PKR.com. However, on 8 January 2013 Cody was announced as a member of Team PokerStars Pro at the PokerStars Caribbean Adventure in the Bahamas. Cody plays online regularly on PokerStars under the screen name "jakecody".

Cody's total live tournament winnings exceed $5,100,000.

== Personal life ==
Jake Cody currently resides in Los Angeles with his girlfriend. He also produces weekly vlogs on his eponymous YouTube channel.

== World Series of Poker bracelets ==
Year	Tournament	Prize (US$)
2011	$25,000 Heads Up No Limit Hold'em Championship	$851,192

== World Poker Tour Title ==
Year	Tournament	Prize (US$)
2010	£5,300 WPT London Main Event	£273,783

== European Poker Tour Title ==
Year	Tournament	Prize (US$)
2010	€5,300 EPT Deauville Main Event	€857,000
