= 2011 World Series of Poker results =

Below are the results for the 2011 World Series of Poker.

== Key ==
*	Elected to the Poker Hall of Fame
(#/#)	This denotes a bracelet winner. The first number is the number of bracelets won in the 2011 WSOP. The second number is the total number of bracelets won. Both numbers represent totals as of that point during the tournament.
Place	What place each player at the final table finished
Name	The player who made it to the final table
Prize (US$)	The amount of money awarded for each finish at the event's final table

== Results ==
=== Event #1: $500 Casino Employees No Limit Hold'em ===
- 2-Day Event: May 31 – June 1
- Place: Rio All Suite Hotel and Casino
- Number of Entries: 850
- Total Prize Pool: $382,500
- Number of Payouts: 81
- Winning Hand: Q♣ 6♣

Final Table
Place	Name	Prize
1st	Sean Drake (1/1)	$82,292
2nd	Jason Baker	$50,807
3rd	Claudio Falcaro	$32,753
4th	Christopher Perez	$23,994
5th	Daniel Quach	$17,835
6th	Richard Kozlowski	$13,437
7th	Adam Falk	$10,247
8th	Joseph Zeman	$7,906
9th	Edward Marcus	$6,165

=== Event #2: $25,000 Heads Up No Limit Hold'em Championship ===
- 4-Day Event: May 31 – June 3
- Place: Rio All Suite Hotel and Casino
- Number of Entries: 128
- Total Prize Pool: $3,040,000
- Number of Payouts: 16
- Winning Hand: K♣ 9♣

Final Table
Place	Name	Prize
1st	Jake Cody (1/1)	$851,192
2nd	Yevgeniy Timoshenko	$525,980
SF	Gus Hansen (0/1)	$283,966
SF	Eric Froehlich (0/2)	$283,966
QF	Matt Marafioti	$138,852
QF	Anthony Guetti	$138,852
QF	Nikolay Evdakov	$138,852
QF	David Paredes	$138,852

=== Event #3: $1,500 Omaha Hi-Low Split-8 or Better ===
- 3-Day Event: June 1–3
- Number of Entries: 925
- Total Prize Pool: $1,248,750
- Number of Payouts: 90
- Winning Hand: Q♥ Q♦ 3♠ 3♣

Final Table
Place	Name	Prize
1st	Francesco Barbaro (1/1)	$262,283
2nd	Kostas Kalathakis	$161,675
3rd	Matthew Waxman	$104,770
4th	Bradley Helm	$76,673
5th	Michael Deveronica	$56,943
6th	Humberto Brenes (0/2)	$42,857
7th	Cameron McKinley	$32,654
8th	Vladimir Shchemelev	$25,174
9th	Travis Pearson	$19,617

=== Event #4: $5,000 No Limit Hold'em ===
- 3-Day Event: June 2–4
- Number of Entries: 865
- Total Prize Pool: $4,065,500
- Number of Payouts: 81
- Winning Hand: 8♥ 8♠

Final Table
Place	Name	Prize
1st	Allen Bari (1/1)	$874,116
2nd	Maria Ho	$540,020
3rd	Sean LeFort	$348,128
4th	Eddie Blumenthal	$255,028
5th	Josh Gahards	$189,574
6th	Ricky Fohrenbach	$142,821
7th	Jesse Chinni	$108,914
8th	Mikhail Lakhitov	$84,033
9th	Farzad Bonyadi (0/3)	$65,535

=== Event #5: $1,500 Seven Card Stud ===
- 3-Day Event: June 2–4
- Number of Entries: 357
- Total Prize Pool: $481,950
- Number of Payouts: 40
- Winning Hand: A♣ 3♦ 9♥ 8♠ 5♠ 9♣ A♥

Final Table
Place	Name	Prize
1st	Eugene Katchalov (1/1)	$122,909
2nd	Alessio Isaia	$75,911
3rd	Eric Buchman (0/1)	$48,961
4th	Jonathan Spinks	$35,476
5th	Dennis Parker	$26,083
6th	Kai Landry	$19,456
7th	Ali Eslami	$14,723
8th	Vasilis Lazarou (0/2)	$11,301

=== Event #6: $1,500 Limit Hold'em ===
- 3-Day Event: June 3–5
- Number of Entries: 675
- Total Prize Pool: $911,250
- Number of Payouts: 63
- Winning Hand: A♠ 2♦

Final Table
Place	Name	Prize
1st	Harrison Wilder (1/1)	$205,065
2nd	Thomas Jamieson	$126,654
3rd	John Myung	$89,840
4th	William Davis	$64,625
5th	Matthew Elsby	$47,138
6th	Sean Nguyen	$34,864
7th	Craig Laben	$26,134
8th	Mitch Schock	$19,856
9th	Scott Clements (0/2)	$15,281

=== Event #7: $10,000 Pot Limit Hold'em Championship ===
- 3-Day Event: June 3–5
- Number of Entries: 249
- Total Prize Pool: $2,340,600
- Number of Payouts: 27
- Winning Hand: A♠ Q♥

Final Table
Place	Name	Prize
1st	Amir Lehavot (1/1)	$573,456
2nd	Jarred Solomon	$354,460
3rd	Sam Stein	$264,651
4th	Stephen Chidwick	$198,927
5th	Todd Callewaert	$150,453
6th	Nicolas Levi	$114,525
7th	Eric Cloutier	$87,702
8th	McLean Karr	$67,596
9th	Michael Benvenuti	$52,406

=== Event #8: $1,000 No Limit Hold'em ===
- 5-Day Event: June 4–8
- Number of Entries: 4,178
- Total Prize Pool: $3,760,200
- Number of Payouts: 423
- Winning Hand: 5♦ 5♥

Final Table
Place	Name	Prize
1st	Sean Getzwiller (1/1)	$611,185
2nd	Sadan Turker	$377,411
3rd	Jon Turner	$274,005
4th	Max Weinberg	$201,433
5th	Stefan Raffay	$149,392
6th	Lawrence Riley	$111,753
7th	Hunter Frey	$84,341
8th	Daniel Haglund	$64,186
9th	Odette Tremblay	$49,258

=== Event #9: $1,500 2–7 Draw Lowball (No Limit) ===
- 3-Day Event: June 4–6
- Number of Entries: 275
- Total Prize Pool: $371,250
- Number of Payouts: 28
- Winning Hand: 8–6–5–3–2

Final Table
Place	Name	Prize
1st	Matt Perrins (1/1)	$102,105
2nd	Chris Bjorin (0/2)	$63,112
3rd	Robin Rightmire	$41,643
4th	Bernard Lee	$28,422
5th	Thomas Fuller	$19,906
6th	Josh Brikis	$14,296
7th	Jason Mercier (0/1)	$10,524

=== Event #10: $1,500 No Limit Hold'em Six Handed ===
- 3-Day Event: June 6–8
- Number of Entries: 1,920
- Total Prize Pool: $2,592,000
- Number of Payouts: 180
- Winning Hand: A♦ K♠

Final Table
Place	Name	Prize
1st	Geffrey Klein (1/1)	$544,388
2nd	Eddie Blumenthal	$334,756
3rd	Jeffrey Papola (0/1)	$214,410
4th	David Vamplew	$141,030
5th	Bryan Colin	$95,333
6th	Anthony Spinella	$66,199

=== Event #11: $10,000 Omaha Hi-Low Split-8 or Better Championship ===
- 3-Day Event: June 6–8
- Number of Entries: 202
- Total Prize Pool: $1,898,800
- Number of Payouts: 27
- Winning Hand: A♣ J♥ 7♥ 3♠

Final Table
Place	Name	Prize
1st	Viacheslav Zhukov (1/1)	$465,216
2nd	George Lind	$287,554
3rd	Steve Billirakis (0/1)	$214,697
4th	Richard Ashby (0/1)	$161,379
5th	Mack Lee	$122,054
6th	Guillaume Rivet	$92,908
7th	Jason Steinberg	$71,148
8th	Mikael Thuritz	$54,837
9th	Josh Arieh (0/2)	$42,514

=== Event #12: $1,500 Triple Chance No Limit Hold'em ===
- 3-Day Event: June 7–9
- Number of Entries: 1,340
- Total Prize Pool: $1,809,000
- Number of Payouts: 144
- Winning Hand: A♥ 10♦

Final Table
Place	Name	Prize
1st	David Diaz (1/1)	$352,808
2nd	Anders Meli	$218,183
3rd	Andrea Dato	$138,044
4th	Bill Chen (0/2)	$100,200
5th	Corey Hastings	$73,915
6th	Richard Trigg	$55,355
7th	Justin Sternberg	$42,059
8th	Nicholas Rampone	$32,381
9th	Matthew Henson	$25,253

=== Event #13: $1,500 No Limit Hold'em Shootout ===
- 3-Day Event: June 8–10
- Number of Entries: 1,440
- Total Prize Pool: $1,944,000
- Number of Payouts: 160
- Winning Hand: K♥ 2♥

Final Table
Place	Name	Prize
1st	Andrew Badecker (1/1)	$369,371
2nd	Robbie Verspui	$228,334
3rd	Daniel Makowsky	$151,379
4th	Jonathan Spinks	$108,358
5th	Erik Cajelais (0/1)	$79,315
6th	Dan Kelly (0/1)	$58,903
7th	Vitaly Lunkin (0/2)	$44,362
8th	Joseph Webber	$33,864
9th	David Pham (0/2)	$26,185

=== Event #14: $3,000 Limit Hold'em ===
- 3-Day Event: June 8–10
- Number of Entries: 337
- Total Prize Pool: $920,010
- Number of Payouts: 36
- Winning Hand: K♦ 10♣

Final Table
Place	Name	Prize
1st	Tyler Bonkowski (1/1)	$220,817
2nd	Brandon Demes	$136,419
3rd	Andrew Brongo	$100,198
4th	Shawn Keller	$74,171
5th	Matt Sterling	$55,338
6th	Mitch Schock	$41,621
7th	Casey McCarrel	$31,547
8th	Ron Burke	$24,095
9th	Jeff Shulman	$18,547

=== Event #15: $1,500 Pot Limit Hold'em ===
- 3-Day Event: June 9–11
- Number of Entries: 765
- Total Prize Pool: $1,032,750
- Number of Payouts: 72
- Winning Hand: K♥ 9♥

Final Table
Place	Name	Prize
1st	Brian Rast (1/1)	$227,232
2nd	Allen Kessler	$140,309
3rd	Dajuan Whorley	$91,212
4th	Daisuke Endo	$66,994
5th	Mika Paasonen	$49,902
6th	Ali Eslami	$37,654
7th	John Gordon	$28,741
8th	Ted Lawson (0/1)	$22,183
9th	Ronald Lee	$17,298

=== Event #16: $10,000 2–7 Draw Lowball Championship (No Limit) ===
- 3-Day Event: June 9–11
- Number of Entries: 126
- Total Prize Pool: $1,184,400
- Number of Payouts: 14
- Winning Hand: J-8-6-3-2

Final Table
Place	Name	Prize
1st	John Juanda (1/5)	$367,170
2nd	Phil Hellmuth* (0/11)	$226,907
3rd	Richard Ashby (0/1)	$143,833
4th	Steve Sung (0/1)	$97,416
5th	Nick Schulman (0/1)	$69,216
6th	David Baker (0/1)	$51,485
7th	Hasan Habib (0/1)	$40,020

=== Event #17: $1,500 H.O.R.S.E. ===
- 3-Day Event: June 10–12
- Number of Entries: 963
- Total Prize Pool: $1,300,050
- Number of Payouts: 96
- Winning Hand: A♦ 8♦ A♠ 6♣ K♣ 3♥ 5♦ (Stud-8)

Final Table
Place	Name	Prize
1st	Aaron Steury (1/1)	$289,283
2nd	Michael Chow (0/1)	$178,691
3rd	Adam Friedman	$121,437
4th	Jonathan Tamayo	$84,516
5th	Ron Ware	$60,036
6th	Denis Ethier (0/1)	$43,512
7th	David Baker	$32,150
8th	Paolo Compagno	$24,219

=== Event #18: $1,500 No Limit Hold'em ===
- 3-Day Event: June 11–13
- Number of Entries: 3,157
- Total Prize Pool: $4,261,950
- Number of Payouts: 324
- Winning Hand: J♥ 9♠

Final Table
Place	Name	Prize
1st	Foster Hays (1/1)	$735,400
2nd	Casey Kelton	$454,920
3rd	Jeffrey Lavelle	$321,947
4th	Allan Le	$233,043
5th	Stanley Tavanese	$170,648
6th	Robert Koss	$126,409
7th	Tristan Wade	$94,700
8th	Philippe Vert	$71,728
9th	Jordan Young	$54,936

=== Event #19: $2,500 Limit Hold'em Six Handed ===
- 3-Day Event: June 11–13
- Number of Entries: 354
- Total Prize Pool: $805,350
- Number of Payouts: 36
- Winning Hand: 4♥ 2♥

Final Table
Place	Name	Prize
1st	Darren Woods (1/1)	$213,431
2nd	Stephanie Nguyen	$131,900
3rd	Samuel Golbuff	$85,616
4th	Alexander Kuzmin	$57,236
5th	Andrey Zaichenko	$39,317
6th	Gabriel Nassif	$27,720

=== Event #20: $1,000 No Limit Hold'em ===
- 3-Day Event: June 12–14
- Number of Entries: 3,175
- Total Prize Pool: $2,857,500
- Number of Payouts: 324
- Winning Hand: A♣ A♥

Final Table
Place	Name	Prize
1st	Jason Somerville (1/1)	$493,091
2nd	Yashar Darian	$305,009
3rd	Travis Atkins	$215,855
4th	Richard Fridvalszki	$156,248
5th	Alexander Martin	$114,414
6th	Gian Oliveri	$84,753
7th	Diana Allen	$63,493
8th	Shane Rose	$48,091
9th	James Schaaf (0/1)	$36,833

=== Event #21: $10,000 Seven Card Stud Championship ===
- 3-Day Event: June 12–14
- Number of Entries: 126
- Total Prize Pool: $1,184,400
- Number of Payouts: 16
- Winning Hand: J♣ 5♣ 9♦ 5♠ 6♠ 6♥ 6♦

Final Table
Place	Name	Prize
1st	Bertrand Grospellier (1/1)	$331,639
2nd	Steve Landfish	$204,924
3rd	Maxwell Troy	$128,341
4th	John Hennigan (0/2)	$92,928
5th	Alexander Kostritsyn	$72,627
6th	Chad Brown	$57,917
7th	Kevin Tang	$47,032
8th	Chris Tryba	$38,812

=== Event #22: $1,500 Pot Limit Omaha ===
- 3-Day Event: June 13–15
- Number of Entries: 1,071
- Total Prize Pool: $1,445,850
- Number of Payouts: 117
- Winning Hand: Q♥ 9♥ 8♦ 7♠

Final Table
Place	Name	Prize
1st	Elie Payan (1/1)	$292,825
2nd	Rafael Kibrit	$181,222
3rd	David Sands	$113,383
4th	Juha Vilkki	$82,297
5th	Stephen Wolfe	$60,754
6th	Emil Patel	$45,544
7th	Cody Munger	$34,642
8th	Jeffrey Sarwer	$26,704
9th	Roland Israelashvili	$20,863

=== Event #23: $2,500 Eight Game Mix ===
- 3-Day Event: June 13–15
- Number of Entries: 489
- Total Prize Pool: $1,112,475
- Number of Payouts: 48
- Winning Hand: 3♦ 2♦ A♥ J♣ J♦ K♦ 8♣ (Stud 8/b)

Final Table
Place	Name	Prize
1st	John Monnette (1/1)	$278,144
2nd	Eric Buchman (0/1)	$171,855
3rd	Michele Limongi	$109,245
4th	Brent Hanks	$78,774
5th	Desmond Portano	$57,692
6th	John Juanda (1/5)	$42,897
7th	Adam Kornuth	$32,373
8th	John Racener	$24,797

=== Event #24: $5,000 No Limit Hold'em Shootout ===
- 3-Day Event: June 14–16
- Number of Entries: 387
- Total Prize Pool: $1,818,900
- Number of Payouts: 40
- Winning Hand: K♥ 10♦

Final Table
Place	Name	Prize
1st	Mark Radoja (1/1)	$436,568
2nd	Jeffrey Gross	$269,742
3rd	Nicolas Fierrogottner	$198,096
4th	Scott Baumstein	$146,639
5th	Adam Junglen	$109,406
6th	Nikita Lebedev	$82,287
7th	Todd Terry	$62,370
8th	Tom Marchese	$47,636
9th	Sean Getzwiller (1/1)	$36,669
10th	Daniel Smith	$28,447

=== Event #25: $1,500 Seven Card Stud Hi-Low-8 or Better ===
- 3-Day Event: June 14–16
- Number of Entries: 606
- Total Prize Pool: $818,100
- Number of Payouts: 56
- Winning Hand: 2♦ 6♦ 6♣ 3♣ Q♦ 8♦ 2♣

Final Table
Place	Name	Prize
1st	Chris Viox (1/1)	$200,459
2nd	Mike Sexton* (0/1)	$123,925
3rd	Gerard Rechnitzer	$77,907
4th	Hakon Lundberg	$55,917
5th	Tyson Marks	$40,782
6th	Cory Zeidman	$30,228
7th	Sean Urban	$22,767
8th	Hernan Salazar	$17,417

=== Event #26: $2,500 No Limit Hold'em Six Handed ===
- 3-Day Event: June 15–17
- Number of Entries: 1,378
- Total Prize Pool: $3,134,950
- Number of Payouts: 126
- Winning Hand: 7♣ 7♥

Final Table
Place	Name	Prize
1st	Oleksii Kovalchuk (1/1)	$689,739
2nd	Anton Ionel	$428,140
3rd	Chris Moorman	$271,800
4th	Dan O'Brien	$179,162
5th	Mazin Khoury	$121,416
6th	Anthony Ruberto	$84,549

=== Event #27: $10,000 Limit Hold'em Championship ===
- 3-Day Event: June 15–17
- Number of Entries: 152
- Total Prize Pool: $1,428,800
- Number of Payouts: 18
- Winning Hand: J♣ 3♣

Final Table
Place	Name	Prize
1st	Daniel Idema (1/1)	$378,642
2nd	Matthew Gallin	$233,994
3rd	Barry Greenstein (0/3)	$169,512
4th	Steve Landfish	$125,120
5th	Dom Denotaristefani	$94,029
6th	Justin Smith	$71,897
7th	Isaac Haxton	$55,908
8th	Richard Brodie	$44,207
9th	Nick Schulman (0/1)	$35,519

=== Event #28: $1,500 No Limit Hold'em ===
- 3-Day Event: June 16–18
- Number of Entries: 2,500
- Total Prize Pool: $3,375,000
- Number of Payouts: 270
- Winning Hand: J♠ 7♦

Final Table
Place	Name	Prize
1st	Andy Frankenberger (1/1)	$599,153
2nd	Joshua Evans	$372,498
3rd	Robert Shortway	$263,655
4th	Owen Crowe	$190,147
5th	Tyler Kenney	$138,847
6th	Steven Merrifield	$102,600
7th	Thao Nguyen	$76,747
8th	Sidney Hasson	$58,083
9th	Bret Hruby	$44,482

=== Event #29: $2,500 10-Game Mix Six Handed ===
- 3-Day Event: June 16–18
- Number of Entries: 431
- Total Prize Pool: $980,525
- Number of Payouts: 42
- Winning Hand: 10–9–8–4–2 (2–7 Triple Draw)

Final Table
Place	Name	Prize
1st	Chris Lee (1/1)	$254,955
2nd	Brian Haveson	$157,491
3rd	Travis Pearson	$101,258
4th	Shaun Deeb	$67,146
5th	Kendall Fukumoto	$45,839
6th	John D'Agostino	$32,200

=== Event #30: $1,000 Seniors No Limit Hold'em Championship ===
- 3-Day Event: June 17–19
- Number of Entries: 3,752
- Total Prize Pool: $3,376,800
- Number of Payouts: 396
- Winning Hand: 10♠ 6♣

Final Table
Place	Name	Prize
1st	James Hess (1/1)	$557,435
2nd	Richard Harwood	$342,407
3rd	Craig Koch	$248,971
4th	Joseph Bolnick	$182,347
5th	Gregory Alston	$134,801
6th	James Jewell	$100,594
7th	Charles Cohen	$75,775
8th	Walter Browne	$57,608
9th	Leo Whitt	$44,202

=== Event #31: $3,000 Pot Limit Omaha ===
- 3-Day Event: June 17–19
- Number of Entries: 685
- Total Prize Pool: $1,870,050
- Number of Payouts: 63
- Winning Hand: A♣ Q♥ J♥ 6♥

Final Table
Place	Name	Prize
1st	Sam Stein (1/1)	$420,802
2nd	Ben Lamb	$259,918
3rd	Warren Fund	$184,368
4th	Christian Harder	$132,623
5th	Adam Junglen	$96,737
6th	Zimnan Ziyard	$71,548
7th	Brock Parker (0/2)	$53,633
8th	Austin Scott	$40,748
9th	Dilyan Kovachev	$31,360

=== Event #32: $1,500 No Limit Hold'em ===
- 3-Day Event: June 18–20
- Number of Entries: 2,828
- Total Prize Pool: $3,817,800
- Number of Payouts: 297
- Winning Hand: 8♣ 8♥

Final Table
Place	Name	Prize
1st	Kirk Caldwell (1/1)	$668,276
2nd	Corbin White	$414,918
3rd	Marc McLaughlin	$292,634
4th	Gabriel Morin	$211,353
5th	Dror Michaelo	$154,506
6th	Randy Haddox	$114,304
7th	Rodrigo Portaleoni	$85,556
8th	Kyle Cartwright	$64,788
9th	Martin Stevens	$49,631

=== Event #33: $10,000 Seven Card Stud Hi-Low Split-8 or Better Championship ===
- 3-Day Event: June 18–20
- Number of Entries: 168
- Total Prize Pool: $1,579,200
- Number of Payouts: 16
- Winning Hand: A♥ 8♦ 3♣ 2♠ 2♣ 3♦ K♦

Final Table
Place	Name	Prize
1st	Eric Rodawig (1/1)	$442,183
2nd	Phil Hellmuth* (0/11)	$273,233
3rd	John Racener	$171,122
4th	Ted Forrest (0/5)	$123,904
5th	David Benyamine (0/1)	$96,836
6th	Mikhail Savinov	$77,222
7th	Joe Tehan	$62,710
8th	Ali Eslami	$51,750

=== Event #34: $1,000 No Limit Hold'em ===
- 3-Day Event: June 19–21
- Number of Entries: 3,144
- Total Prize Pool: $2,829,600
- Number of Payouts: 324
- Winning Hand: Q♠ Q♣

Final Table
Place	Name	Prize
1st	Mark Schmid (1/1)	$488,283
2nd	Justin Cohen	$302,031
3rd	Andrew Rudnik	$213,747
4th	Jonathan Clancy	$154,722
5th	Trevor Vanderveen	$113,297
6th	Benjamin Volpe	$83,925
7th	Robbie Verspui	$62,873
8th	Michael Souza	$47,622
9th	Jeremy Kottler	$36,473

=== Event #35: $5,000 Pot Limit Omaha Six Handed ===
- 3-Day Event: June 20–22
- Number of Entries: 507
- Total Prize Pool: $2,382,900
- Number of Payouts: 54
- Winning Hand: Q♣ 6♣ 5♦ 3♠

Final Table
Place	Name	Prize
1st	Jason Mercier (1/2)	$619,575
2nd	Hans Winzeler	$383,075
3rd	Steven Merrifield	$239,100
4th	David Chiu (0/4)	$156,628
5th	Joseph Ressler	$105,967
6th	Michael McDonald	$73,965

=== Event #36: $2,500 No Limit Hold'em ===
- 3-Day Event: June 21–23
- Number of Entries: 1,734
- Total Prize Pool: $3,944,850
- Number of Payouts: 171
- Winning Hand: K♥ 2♦

Final Table
Place	Name	Prize
1st	Mikhail Lakhitov (1/1)	$749,610
2nd	Hassan Babajane	$463,480
3rd	Thomas Middleton	$305,015
4th	Thomas Miller	$219,885
5th	Ed Sabat	$160,949
6th	Matthew Berkey	$119,528
7th	James St. Hilaire	$90,021
8th	Conrad Monica	$68,719
9th	Lloyd Padgett	$53,137

=== Event #37: $10,000 H.O.R.S.E. Championship ===
- 3-Day Event: June 21–23
- Number of Entries: 240
- Total Prize Pool: $2,256,000
- Number of Payouts: 24
- Winning Hand: Q♦ J♠ 8♥ 6♥ (Omaha-8)

Final Table
Place	Name	Prize
1st	Fabrice Soulier (1/1)	$609,130
2nd	Shawn Buchanan	$376,458
3rd	Andrey Zaichenko	$247,799
4th	Daniel Ospina	$180,750
5th	Tom Dwan	$134,480
6th	Matthew Ashton	$101,813
7th	Michael Binger	$78,328
8th	Jacobo Fernandez	$61,160

=== Event #38: $1,500 No Limit Hold'em ===
- 3-Day Event: June 22–24
- Number of Entries: 2,192
- Total Prize Pool: $2,959,200
- Number of Payouts: 216
- Winning Hand: Q♣ J♦

Final Table
Place	Name	Prize
1st	Arkadiy Tsinis (1/1)	$540,136
2nd	Michael Blanovsky	$336,253
3rd	Randolph Lanosga	$233,732
4th	Pim de Goede	$168,334
5th	Paul Nash	$123,028
6th	Perry Lin	$91,010
7th	David Rounick	$68,209
8th	Ryan Laplante	$51,771
9th	Christopher Homan	$39,756

=== Event #39: $2,500 Pot Limit Hold'em/Omaha ===
- 3-Day Event: June 22–24
- Number of Entries: 606
- Total Prize Pool: $1,378,650
- Number of Payouts: 63
- Winning Hand: A♣ A♦ 6♦ 3♣

Final Table
Place	Name	Prize
1st	Mitch Schock (1/1)	$310,225
2nd	Rodney Brown	$191,618
3rd	Jan Collado	$135,921
4th	Carter Gill	$97,773
5th	Tyler Patterson	$71,317
6th	James Vanneman	$52,747
7th	David Lestock	$39,539
8th	Jonas Mackoff	$30,040
9th	Rami Boukai (0/1)	$23,119

=== Event #40: $5,000 No Limit Hold'em Six Handed ===
- 3-Day Event: June 23–25
- Number of Entries: 732
- Total Prize Pool: $3,440,400
- Number of Payouts: 78
- Winning Hand: A♠ 8♥

Final Table
Place	Name	Prize
1st	Matt Jarvis (1/1)	$808,538
2nd	Justin Filtz	$499,855
3rd	Wesley Pantling	$317,136
4th	Robert Merulla	$208,281
5th	Tore Lukashaugen	$141,125
6th	Matthew Vengrin	$98,567

=== Event #41: $1,500 Limit Hold'em Shootout ===
- 3-Day Event: June 24–26
- Number of Entries: 538
- Total Prize Pool: $726,300
- Number of Payouts: 60
- Winning Hand: K♠ 4♥

Final Table
Place	Name	Prize
1st	Justin Pechie (1/1)	$167,060
2nd	Dale Eberle	$103,454
3rd	Mathieu Jacqmin	$68,715
4th	Eugene Katchalov (0/1)	$50,993
5th	Jordan Rich	$38,268
6th	Stephen Bass	$29,001
7th	Adam Tyburski	$22,173
8th	Dom Denotaristefani	$17,089
9th	Christoph Kwon	$13,269
10th	Ari Engel	$10,378

=== Event #42: $10,000 Pot Limit Omaha Championship ===
- 3-Day Event: June 24–26
- Number of Entries: 361
- Total Prize Pool: $3,393,400
- Number of Payouts: 36
- Winning Hand: 6♠ 5♥ 4♠ 2♦

Final Table
Place	Name	Prize
1st	Ben Lamb (1/1)	$814,436
2nd	Sami Kelopuro	$503,173
3rd	John Shipley	$369,575
4th	Christopher King	$273,575
5th	Dario Alioto (0/1)	$204,113
6th	John Kabbaj (0/1)	$153,517
7th	Cory Wood	$116,359
8th	Joshua Tieman (0/1)	$88,873
9th	Hans Winzeler	$68,410

=== Event #43: $1,500 No Limit Hold'em ===
- 3-Day Event: June 25–27
- Number of Entries: 2,857
- Total Prize Pool: $3,856,950
- Number of Payouts: 297
- Winning Hand: : K♦ J♥

Final Table
Place	Name	Prize
1st	André Akkari (1/1)	$675,117
2nd	Nachman Berlin	$419,173
3rd	Matthew Carmody	$295,635
4th	Jacob Naquin	$213,520
5th	Scott Sitron	$156,090
6th	Nicolas Chouity	$115,477
7th	Zachary Hall	$86,434
8th	Philip Meulyzer	$65,452
9th	Ray Foley (0/1)	$50,140

=== Event #44: $2,500 Seven Card Razz ===
- 3-Day Event: June 25–27
- Number of Entries: 363
- Total Prize Pool: $825,825
- Number of Payouts: 40
- Winning Hand: (6–9–8)-8-2-Q-(4)

Final Table
Place	Name	Prize
1st	Rep Porter (1/2)	$210,615
2nd	Stephen Su	$130,075
3rd	Tommy Chen	$83,895
4th	Robert Williamson III (0/1)	$60,788
5th	Andreas Krause	$44,693
6th	Chris Bjorin (0/2)	$33,338
7th	Matthew Smith	$25,228
8th	Scott Epstein	$19,365

=== Event #45: $1,000 No Limit Hold'em ===
- 3-Day Event: June 26–28
- Number of Entries: 2,890
- Total Prize Pool: $2,601,000
- Number of Payouts: 297
- Winning Hand: A♦ A♣

Final Table
Place	Name	Prize
1st	Kenneth Griffin (1/1)	$455,356
2nd	Jean Luc Marais	$282,676
3rd	Philip Hammerling	$199,366
4th	Eric Baudry	$143,991
5th	Andrew Teng	$105,262
6th	Jonathan Lane	$77,873
7th	Antonio Esfandiari (0/1)	$58,288
8th	Aaron Massey	$44,138
9th	Jeremiah Siegmund	$33,813

=== Event #46: $10,000 No Limit Hold'em Six Handed Championship ===
- 3-Day Event: June 27–29 (extended to June 30)
- Number of Entries: 474
- Total Prize Pool: $4,455,600
- Number of Payouts: 48
- Winning Hand: K♦ 4♦

Final Table
Place	Name	Prize
1st	Joe Ebanks (1/1)	$1,158,481
2nd	Chris Moorman	$716,282
3rd	Bertrand Grospellier (1/1)	$447,074
4th	Tristan Wade	$292,866
5th	Taylor Paur	$198,140
6th	Todd Manin	$138,301

=== Event #47: $2,500 Omaha/Seven Card Stud Hi-Low-8 or Better ===
- 3-Day Event: June 27–29
- Number of Entries: 450
- Total Prize Pool: $1,023,750
- Number of Payouts: 48
- Winning Hand: Q♥ 10♣ 5♥ 3♣

Final Table
Place	Name	Prize
1st	Owais Ahmed (1/1)	$255,959
2nd	Michael Mizrachi (0/1)	$158,148
3rd	Abe Mosseri (0/1)	$100,532
4th	Scott Bohlman	$72,491
5th	Scotty Nguyen (0/5)	$53,091
6th	Gerard Rechnitzer	$39,475
7th	Gregory Jamison	$29,791
8th	Thomas Whitehair	$22,819

=== Event #48: $1,500 No Limit Hold'em ===
- 3-Day Event: June 28–30
- Number of Entries: 2,713
- Total Prize Pool: $3,662,550
- Number of Payouts: 270
- Winning Hand: J♠ 8♦

Final Table
Place	Name	Prize
1st	Athanasios Polychronopoulos (1/1)	$650,223
2nd	Simon Charette	$404,235
3rd	Peter Ippolito	$286,118
4th	Yevgeniy Timoshenko	$206,348
5th	Sebastian Winkler	$150,677
6th	Alexander Queen	$111,341
7th	Pius Heinz	$83,286
8th	Matt Stout	$63,032
9th	Niklas Heinecker	$48,272

=== Event #49: $2,500 2–7 Triple Draw Lowball (Limit) ===
- 3-Day Event: June 28–30
- Number of Entries: 309
- Total Prize Pool: $702,975
- Number of Payouts: 30
- Winning Hand: 8–7–6–4–3

Final Table
Place	Name	Prize
1st	Leonard Martin (1/1)	$189,818
2nd	Justin Bonomo	$117,305
3rd	David Bach (0/1)	$77,517
4th	Masayoshi Tanaka	$52,680
5th	Eli Elezra (0/1)	$36,596
6th	Jason Mercier (1/2)	$25,967

=== Event #50: $5,000 Triple Chance No Limit Hold'em ===
- 3-Day Event: June 29 – July 1
- Number of Entries: 817
- Total Prize Pool: $3,839,900
- Number of Payouts: 81
- Winning Hand: A♠ 8♥

Final Table
Place	Name	Prize
1st	Antonin Teisseire (1/1)	$825,604
2nd	Darryl Ronconi	$510,053
3rd	Adam Geyer	$328,810
4th	Eric Froehlich (0/2)	$240,876
5th	Narendra Banwari	$179,054
6th	Vanessa Peng	$134,895
7th	Mikhail Yakovlev	$102,870
8th	Andrew Savitz	$79,370
9th	James Routos	$61,899

=== Event #51: $1,500 Pot Limit Omaha Hi-Low Split-8 or Better ===
- 3-Day Event: June 30 – July 2
- Number of Entries: 946
- Total Prize Pool: $1,277,100
- Number of Payouts: 90
- Winning Hand: A♦ 8♣ 10♦ 5♥

Final Table
Place	Name	Prize
1st	David Singontiko (1/1)	$268,235
2nd	Michael Yee	$165,346
3rd	Jeffrey Gibralter	$107,148
4th	Igor Sharaskin	$78,413
5th	Thomas Scarber	$58,235
6th	Marco Oliveira	$43,830
7th	Cliff Kettinger	$33,396
8th	Robert Campbell	$25,746
9th	John Reiss	$20,063

=== Event #52: $2,500 Mixed Hold'em ===
- 3-Day Event: June 30 – July 2
- Number of Entries: 580
- Total Prize Pool: $1,319,500
- Number of Payouts: 54
- Winning Hand: A♠ 10♣

Final Table
Place	Name	Prize
1st	Matt Matros (1/2)	$303,501
2nd	Jonathan Lane	$187,844
3rd	Matt Hawrilenko (0/1)	$124,837
4th	Brandon Meyers	$92,642
5th	Brian Smith	$69,524
6th	Nikolay Losev	$52,687
7th	Noah Boeken	$40,284
8th	Aalok Arora	$31,047
9th	Adam Sanders	$24,107

=== Event #53: $1,000 Ladies No Limit Hold'em Championship ===
- 3-Day Event: July 1–3
- Number of Entries: 1,055
- Total Prize Pool: $949,500
- Number of Payouts: 117
- Winning Hand: Q♥ 9♥

Final Table
Place	Name	Prize
1st	Marsha Wolak (1/1)	$192,344
2nd	Karina Jett	$119,010
3rd	Carol Tomlinson	$74,459
4th	Valerie McColligan	$54,045
5th	Peg Ledman	$39,897
6th	Katherine Stahl	$29,909
7th	Jennifer Cowan	$22,750
8th	Genevieve Gloutnez	$17,537
9th	Jonathan Epstein	$13,701

=== Event #54: $1,000 No Limit Hold'em ===
- 5-Day Event: July 2–6
- Number of Entries: 4,576
- Total Prize Pool: $4,118,400
- Number of Payouts: 468
- Winning Hand: A♥ K♠

Final Table
Place	Name	Prize
1st	Maxim Lykov (1/1)	$648,880
2nd	Dror Michaelo	$401,296
3rd	Warren Wooldridge	$288,946
4th	Ren Ho Zhang	$213,539
5th	Harald Olsen	$159,134
6th	Stanislav Alekhin	$119,598
7th	Douglas MacKinnon	$90,604
8th	Joshua Evans	$69,230
9th	Sebastien Roy	$53,333

=== Event #55: $50,000 The Poker Player's Championship ===
- 5-Day Event: July 2–6
- Number of Entries: 128
- Total Prize Pool: $6,144,000
- Number of Payouts: 16
- Winning Hand: K♣ Q♣

Final Table
Place	Name	Prize
1st	Brian Rast (2/2)	$1,720,328
2nd	Phil Hellmuth* (0/11)	$1,063,034
3rd	Minh Ly	$665,763
4th	Owais Ahmed (1/1)	$482,058
5th	Matt Glantz	$376,750
6th	George Lind	$300,441
7th	Scott Seiver (0/1)	$243,978
8th	Ben Lamb (1/1)	$201,338

=== Event #56: $1,500 No Limit Hold'em ===
- 3-Day Event: July 5–7
- Number of Entries: 3,389
- Total Prize Pool: $4,575,150
- Number of Payouts: 342
- Winning Hand: A♠ 4♦

Final Table
Place	Name	Prize
1st	Alexander Anter (1/1)	$777,928
2nd	Nemer Haddad	$479,521
3rd	Andy Philachack	$345,698
4th	Selim Espoulmekki	$251,267
5th	John Borzio	$184,561
6th	John Horvatich	$137,025
7th	Rayan Nathan	$102,803
8th	Ryan Goindoo	$77,914
9th	James Boyle	$59,705

=== Event #57: $5,000 Pot Limit Omaha Hi-Low Split-8 or Better ===
- 3-Day Event: July 5–7
- Number of Entries: 352
- Total Prize Pool: $1,654,400
- Number of Payouts: 36
- Winning Hand: A♣ 5♦ 3♣ 3♦

Final Table
Place	Name	Prize
1st	Nick Binger (1/1)	$397,073
2nd	David Bach (0/1)	$245,314
3rd	Bryce Yockey	$180,180
4th	Phil Laak (0/1)	$133,377
5th	Trevor Reader	$99,512
6th	Peter Charalambous	$74,845
7th	Nick Schulman (0/1)	$56,729
8th	Bjorn Verbakel	$43,328
9th	Allen Kessler	$33,352

=== Event #58: $10,000 No Limit Hold'em Championship ===
- 13-Day Event: July 7–19
- Final Table: November 6–8
- Number of Entries: 6,865
- Total Prize Pool: $64,531,000
- Number of Payouts: 693
- Winning Hand: A♠ K♣

Place	Name	Prize
1st	Pius Heinz (1/1)	$8,715,638
2nd	Martin Staszko	$5,433,086
3rd	Ben Lamb (1/1)	$4,021,138
4th	Matt Giannetti	$3,012,700
5th	Phil Collins	$2,269,599
6th	Eoghan O'Dea	$1,720,831
7th	Badih "Bob" Bounahra	$1,314,097
8th	Anton Makiievskyi	$1,010,015
9th	Sam Holden	$782,115
