= Athanasios Polychronopoulos =

Green-American poker player (born 1984)

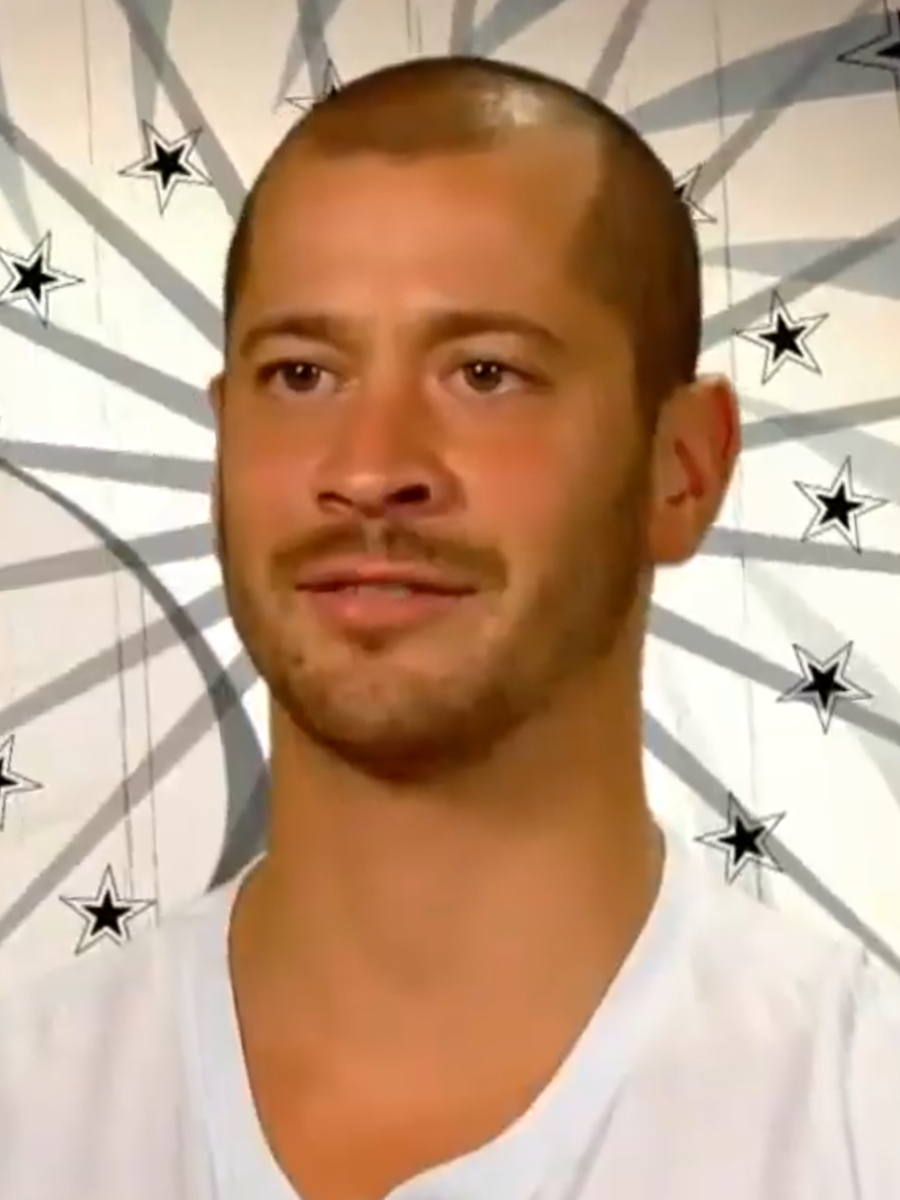
- Polychronopoulos in 2014
- Nickname: Athanasios 9 (Full Tilt)
- Born: 1984 (age 41–42); Southampton, New York, U.S.

World Series of Poker
- Bracelets: 2
- Final tables: 3
- Money finishes: 31
- Highest WSOP Main Event finish: 572, 2016

World Poker Tour
- Money finishes: 6

Athanasios Polychronopoulos (born 1984) is a Greek-American professional poker player who won World Series of Poker bracelets at the 2011 and 2013 World Series of Poker.

== Poker career ==
When he won his first bracelet at the 2,713-entrant $1,500 No Limit Hold'em 2011 World Series of Poker Event 48, Polychronopoulos defeated a final table that included Yevgeniy Timoshenko and Pius Heinz. When he won the 2,105-entrant $1,500 No Limit Hold'em 2013 World Series of Poker Event 17, he defeated a final table that included Joe Cada and David "Bakes" Baker. According to Poker News Daily, he is the first player to win two large field $1,500 or less buy-in events (2,713 entrants in 2010 and 2,105 in 2013). British professional Praz Bansi can make a similar claim over slightly smaller fields with victories over 1,100 entrants in 2006 and 2,092 in 2010.

At the 2010 PokerStars Spring Championship of Online Poker $1,050 No Limit Hold'em Main Event – M, Polychronopoulos was among the final three players who brokered a chop yielding him $418,500 when he finished third. In addition to his WSOP success, he has won some major online tournaments online at Full Tilt Poker. On September 13, 2010, he won the "Full Tilt 1K Monday" for a $98,750 prize in the $1,000+$60 buy-in event against a field of 395 contestants. He had previously won the 560-person $500 + $35 January 29, 2010, Friday Night Fight No-limit Hold'em Bounty event on Full Tilt for a prize of $56,000.

== Background ==
Polychronopoulos was born in Southampton, New York and resides in Springs, New York, but his parents come from Greece. Polychronopoulos is a former restaurateur. When he won World Series of Poker bracelets, the Greek National Anthem was played. Athanasios, which is Greek, translates to either "immortal" or "eternal life". As of July 7, 2013, the twenty-six letters in his full name make it the longest of anyone to ever win a World Series of Poker bracelet.

== World Series of Poker ==
World Series of Poker results
Year	Cashes	Final Tables	Bracelets
2011	2	1	1
2012	4	1	0
2013	3	1	1
2014	4	0	0
2015	2	0	0
2016	5	0	0
2017	3	0	0
2018	8	0	0

World Series of Poker bracelets
Year	Tournament	Prize (US$)
2011	$1,500 No Limit Texas hold 'em	$650,223
2013	$1,500 No Limit Texas hold 'em	$518,755
