= Matt Perrins =

British poker player

- Nickname: pez102 (Full Tilt)
- Born: c. 1988 (age 37–38)

World Series of Poker
- Bracelets: 2
- Final tables: 2
- Money finishes: 4

European Poker Tour
- Money finishes: 2

Matt Perrins (born c. 1988) is a British professional poker player who won World Series of Poker bracelets at the 2011 and 2013 World Series of Poker.

== Background ==
Perrins is a resident of Rochdale. He learned to play poker by playing with Jake Cody, whom he has known his whole life. Prior to becoming a professional poker player, Perrins was an engineer.

== Career highlights ==
In 2009, Perrins won the PokerStars.com Italian Poker Tour Venice, collecting €851,660 in the process against a field of 438 contestants that included Johnny Lodden, Dario Minieri, and Vanessa Rousso. Perrins was the first non-Italian to win an event on the PokerStars Italian Poker Tour. In 2010, he was featured on Late Night Poker along with Phil Ivey, Carlos Mortensen, James Akenhead, John Duthie, Scott Fischman, Michael Binger, and Ben Roberts.

When Perrins won the 275-entrant $1,500 2–7 Draw Lowball (No Limit) 2011 World Series of Poker Event 9 against a final table that included Jason Mercier, Bernard Lee and eventual runner-up Chris Björin, it was the first time he had ever played no-limit deuce-to-seven draw lowball. He won the 784-entrant $5,000 No Limit Hold'em 2013 World Series of Poker Event 57, earning nearly $800,000. Among those he defeated at the final table was Matt Berkey, who was at his third final table of the 2013 series. The victory came on the last day before the 2013 Main Event began on 6 July.

Online at Full Tilt Poker, where Perrins plays under the nickname "pez102". On 18 October 2009, he won the 2,606-entrant $200 buy-in Sunday Brawl for a prize of $105,803.60.

== World Series of Poker ==
World Series of Poker results
Year	Cashes	Final Tables	Bracelets
2011	1	1	1
2012	1	0	0
2013	2	1	1

World Series of Poker bracelets
Year	Tournament	Prize (US$)
2011	$1,500 2-7 Draw Lowball (No-Limit)	$102,105
2013	$5,000 No Limit Texas hold 'em	$792,275
