= Latin American Poker Tour season 6 results =

The sixth season of Latin American Poker Tour was held in 2013. There were 6 stops during the season, held in countries in Latin America. All amounts are in US dollars.

== Results ==
=== (Chile) LAPT Viña del Mar ===
- Casino: Enjoy Viña del Mar Casino & Resort
- Buy-in: $1,100
- Date: March 13–17, 2013
- Number of buy-ins: 1024
- Total Prize Pool: $993,280
- Number of Payouts: 160
- Winning Hand: Q♠ T♣

Final Table
Place	Name	Prize
1st	(Argentina) Pablo Tavitian	$184,220
2nd	(Brazil) Leonardo Martins	$117,200
3rd	(Argentina) Jose Ignacio Barbero	$78,460
4th	(Chile) Jaime Mayol	$57,620
5th	(Argentina) Fernando Gordo	$41,720
6th	(Brazil) Sérgio Braga	$31,720
7th	(Chile) Alejandro Cholakis	$23,780
8th	(Argentina) Sebastian Miranda	$19,220

=== (Brazil) LAPT São Paulo ===
- Casino: Tivoli Moffarej
- Buy-in: Approx. $2,000
- Date: April 25–30, 2013
- Number of buy-ins: 753
- Total Prize Pool: $1,315,740
- Number of Payouts: 56
- Winning Hand: Q♠ 4♠

Final Table
Place	Name	Prize
1st	(Brazil) Victor Sbrissa	$263,737
2nd	(Brazil) Daniel Murta de Almeida	$167,000
3rd	(Colombia) Rafael Pardo	$115,700
4th	(Brazil) Leonardo Bresia	$85,500
5th	(Brazil) André Akkari	$64,450
6th	(Brazil) Marcos Paulo de Almeida	$47,350
7th	(Argentina) Leonardo Fernandez	$34,200
8th	(Brazil) Thiago Azevedo Grigoletti	$26,300

=== LAPT Colombia ===
- Casino: Casino Allegre - Centro Comercial Premium Plaza
- Buy-in: Approx. $1,100
- Date: June 5–9, 2013
- Number of buy-ins: 629
- Total Prize Pool: $571,080
- Number of Payouts: 96
- Winning Hand: 9♣ 8♥

Final Table
Place	Name	Prize
1st	(Colombia) Weider Gutierrez	$115,510
2nd	(Venezuela) Miguel Angel Moscoso	$74,810
3rd	(Colombia) Miguel Velasco	$51,850
4th	(Mexico) Christian De Leòn Angeles	$38,720
5th	(Argentina) Alejandro Arruabarrena	$29,010
6th	(Ecuador) Pablo Luzardo	$21,585
7th	(Colombia) Mayu Roca Uribe	$15,875
8th	(Argentina) Juan Martin Pastor	$11,875

=== (Peru) LAPT Lima ===
- Casino: Atlantic City Casino
- Buy-in: $1,650
- Date: July 31 to August 4, 2013
- Number of buy-ins: 557
- Total Prize Pool: $835,500
- Number of Payouts: 88
- Winning Hand: A♥10♣

Final Table
Place	Name	Prize
1st	(Chile) Patricio Rojas	$123,840
2nd	(Venezuela) Rafael Pardo	$100,000
3rd	(Peru) Victor Jesus Lay	$80,000
4th	(Chile) Ricardo Chauriye	$60,000
5th	(Canada) Scott Diver	$50,000
6th	(Russia) Andrey Spitsyn	$45,000
7th	(Peru) Carlos Noriega	$40,000
8th	(Argentina) Julian Menendez	$17,600

=== LAPT Panama ===
- Casino: Veneto Casino
- Buy-in: $1,500 + $150
- Date: September 18–22, 2013
- Number of buy-ins: 570
- Total Prize Pool: $829,340
- Number of Payouts: 88
- Winning Hand: 5♠ 6♠

Mesa final
Place	Name	Prize
1st	(Panama) Galal Dahrouj	$132,535
2nd	(Brazil) Joel Oliveira	$115,540
3rd	(Honduras) Jesus Kafati	$106,365
4th	(United States) Carter Gill	$57,060
5th	(Brazil) Paulo Carrillo	$42,960
6th	(Panama) Raul Pino	$32,180
7th	(United States) Joseph Stefan	$23,880
8th	(Brazil) Marco Oliveira	$18,080

=== LAPT Uruguay Grand Final ===
- Casino: Mantra Resort & Casino
- Buy-in: $2,300 + $200
- Date: November 21–24, 2013
- Number of buy-ins: 508
- Total Prize Pool: $1,133,340
- Number of Payouts: 80
- Winning Hand: Q♣ 6♣

Mesa final
Place	Name	Prize
1st	(United States) Carter Gill	$218,692
2nd	(Argentina) Ivan Raich	$172,568
3rd	(Argentina) Ariel Mantel	$106,300
4th	(Argentina) Andres Korn	$79,100
5th	(Argentina) Juan Manuel Perez	$59,800
6th	(Uruguay) Cesar Sanguinetti	$45,100
7th	(Brazil) João Bauer	$33,780
8th	(Peru) Walid Mubarak	$25,840
