= Odendorf =

Village in Germany

Coordinates: 50°38′52″N 6°52′50″E

Map
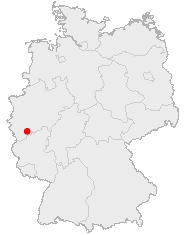

Odendorf is a village in Germany, located in the municipality of Swisttal in the Rhein-Sieg district of North Rhine-Westphalia. The village is situated approximately 20 km (12 mi) southwest of Bonn. As of 2007, the village had 3,581 inhabitants.

== Local business ==
Odendorf offers a wide range of local business. Situated in the village are an Edeka supermarket, also an Aldi as well a Rossmann drugstore. also a gas-station, post office, banks, pharmacy and several restaurants are based in the village. In a new business park further industrial business (manufacturing, wholesale trade) is located and land is still available for sale.

== Infrastructure ==
Odendorf is located 6 km (3.7 mi) west of Highway A61 with connection to Aachen (A61), Cologne (A1) and Koblenz (A61). Also Deutsche Bahn offers a regular Regionalbahn service on the Voreifel Railway between Euskirchen and Bonn. Also a bus service to Rheinbach and Euskirchen (school-service only) is available. The nearest airport is Cologne/Bonn Airport.

== Notable residents ==
- Pius Heinz - Winner of the Main Event at the 2011 World Series of Poker.
