= Italian Poker Tour season 1 results =

Season 1 of Italian Series of poker tournaments sponsored by PokerStars

== Season 1 ==
Below are the results of the first season of the Italian Poker Tour (IPT) sponsored by PokerStars

The winner of the IPT Leaderboard ranking will win a sponsorship contract for all stages of the second season of the PokerStars.it Italian Poker Tour.

=== (Italy) IPT Sanremo I ===
- Venue: Casino Sanremo, Sanremo, Italy
- Buy-in: €2,200
- 3-Day Event: June 5–7, 2009
- Number of buy-ins: 254
- Total Prize Pool: €508,000
- Number of Payouts: 40
- Official Results:

Final table
Place	Name	Prize
1st	(Italy) Stefano Puccilli	€120,000
2nd	(Italy) Vittorio Meraviglia	€70,000
3rd	(France) Roger Hairabedian	€35,000
4th	(Italy) Enzo Nardotto	€35,000
5th	(Italy) Alessandro Speranza	€27,000
6th	(Italy) Giovanni Drago	€22,000
7th	(Italy) Luca Moschitta	€17,000
8th	(Italy) Bruno Stefanelli	€12,000

=== (Italy) IPT Venice I ===
- Venue: Casino Di Venezia, Venice, Italy
- Buy-in: €2,200
- 4-Day Event: July 30-August 2, 2009
- Number of buy-ins: 439
- Total Prize Pool: €851,660
- Number of Payouts: 61
- Official Results:

Final table
Place	Name	Prize
1st	(England) Matt Perrins	€150,000
2nd	(Sweden) Johan Soderstrom	€120,000
3rd	(Denmark) Jesper Witved	€90,000
4th	(Italy) Luigi Pignataro	€80,000
5th	(Italy) Gianluca Bovini	€65,000
6th	(Italy) Marco Petrocchi	€30,000
7th	(Italy) Sandro Mescola	€20,000
8th	(Italy) Massimiliano Forti	€15,060

=== (Italy) IPT Sanremo II ===
- Venue: Casino Sanremo, Sanremo, Italy
- Buy-in: €2,200
- 5-Day Event: August 27–31, 2009
- Number of buy-ins: 368
- Total Prize Pool: €713,920
- Number of Payouts: 56
- Official Results:

Final table
Place	Name	Prize
1st	(Sweden) Ramzi Jelassi	€170,000
2nd	(Italy) Andrea Sapere	€100,000
3rd	(Italy) Francesco Veronese	€68,000
4th	(Italy) Massimo Di Cicco	€50,000
5th	(Italy) Giuseppe Pipino	€39,000
6th	(Italy) Roberto Pompei	€28,000
7th	(Switzerland) Claudio Rinaldi	€18,000
8th	(Italy) Niccolo Domeniconi	€13,000

=== (Slovenia) IPT Nova Gorica I ===
- Venue: Perla Casino & Hotel, Nova Gorica, Slovenia
- Buy-in: €2,200
- 5-Day Event: October 8–12, 2009
- Number of buy-ins: 332
- Total Prize Pool: €664,000
- Number of Payouts: 48
- Official Results:

Final table
Place	Name	Prize
1st	(Italy) Marco Figuccia	€160,000
2nd	(Italy) Marco Pistilli	€95,000
3rd	(Italy) Davide Pennelli	€65,000
4th	(Slovenia) Primoz Adamic	€45,000
5th	(Italy) Antonino Di Martino	€35,000
6th	(Italy) Sebastiano Kisvarday	€27,000
7th	(Italy) Marco Bognanni	€20,000
8th	(Italy) Gennaro Falanga	€16,200

=== (Italy) IPT Sanremo III ===
- Venue: Casino Sanremo, Sanremo, Italy
- Buy-in: €2,200
- 5-Day Event: November 12–16, 2009
- Number of buy-ins: 325
- Total Prize Pool: €670,000
- Number of Payouts: 48
- Official Results:

Final table
Place	Name	Prize
1st	(Italy) Giovanni Salvatore	€150,000
2nd	(Italy) Umberto Pavoncello	€85,000
3rd	(Italy) Alessandro Pennisi	€60,000
4th	(Italy) Mario Ristaldi	€42,000
5th	(France) Christian Debeil	€31,000
6th	(Italy) Gianbattista Sacchella	€25,000
7th	(Italy) Sergio Castelluccio	€20,000
8th	(Italy) Romolo Rosa	€16,700

=== (Italy) IPT Sanremo IV ===
- Venue: Casino Sanremo, Sanremo, Italy
- Buy-in: €2,200
- 5-Day Event: December 10–14, 2009
- Number of buy-ins: 273
- Total Prize Pool: €529,620
- Number of Payouts: 32
- Official Results:

Final table
Place	Name	Prize
1st	(Italy) Alessio Isaia	€140,000
2nd	(Italy) Alioscia Oliva	€93,000
3rd	(Italy) Gerardo Muro	€58,000
4th	(Italy) Giorgio Salemi	€42,500
5th	(Italy) Stefano Puccilli	€27,000
6th	(Finland) Joni Jouhkimainen	€21,400
7th	(Italy) Tania Scremin	€16,000
8th	(Finland) Riku Koivurinne	€13,000

=== (Italy) IPT Venice II ===
- Venue: Casino di Venezia, Venice, Italy
- Buy-in: €2,200
- 5-Day Event: January 14–18, 2010
- Number of buy-ins: 310
- Total Prize Pool: €600,000
- Number of Payouts: 48
- Official Results:

Final table
Place	Name	Prize
1st	(Italy) Salvatore Bonavena	€155,000
2nd	(Italy) Giuseppe Diep	€100,000
3rd	(Hungary) Andras Kovacs	€60,000
4th	(Italy) Gianni Billa	€45,000
5th	(Italy) Sergio Castelluccio	€30,000
6th	(Italy) Paolo Petrucci	€24,000
7th	(Italy) Gianluca Marcucci	€18,000
8th	(Italy) Massimiliano Forti	€12,600

=== (Italy) IPT Sanremo V ===
- Venue: Casino Sanremo, Sanremo, Italy
- Buy-in: €2,200
- 5-Day Event: February 25-March 1, 2010
- Number of buy-ins: 488
- Total Prize Pool: €976,000
- Number of Payouts: 72
- Official Results:

Final table
Place	Name	Prize
1st	(Hungary) Valdemar Kwaysser	€227,000
2nd	(Italy) Enrico Castaldi	€142,000
3rd	(Italy) Massimo Valentini	€85,000
4th	(United States) Brent Wheeler	€57,000
5th	(Italy) Michele Di Lauro	€45,000
6th	(Italy) Antonio Scalzi	€33,000
7th	(England) Matt Perrins	€24,000
8th	(Italy) Andrea Benelli	€17,500

=== (Slovenia) IPT Nova Gorica II ===
- Venue: Perla Casino & Hotel, Nova Gorica, Slovenia
- Buy-in: €2,200
- 5-Day Event: March 18–22, 2010
- Number of buy-ins: 393
- Total Prize Pool: €762,420
- Number of Payouts: 56
- Official Results:

Final table
Place	Name	Prize
1st	(Italy) Giuseppe Di Cicco	€200,000
2nd	(Italy) Manlio Iemina	€121,000
3rd	(Italy) Michele Di Lauro	€75,000
4th	(Hungary) Peter Kamaras	€57,000
5th	(Italy) Vincenzo Tommasone	€38,000
6th	(Italy) Roberto Masullo	€30,000
7th	(Italy) Paolo Palmieri	€23,000
8th	(Italy) Giovanni Salvatore	€15,000

- Italian Poker Tour - Season 1 Champion: (Italy) Giannino Salvatore
