= Joe Ebanks =

American poker player

- Nicknames: ender555 (PokerStars) sampson724 (Full Tilt)
- Born: 1984 or 1985 (age 41–42)

World Series of Poker
- Bracelet: 1
- Final tables: 2
- Money finishes: 22
- Highest WSOP Main Event finish: 596th, 2013

World Poker Tour
- Title: None
- Final table: 1
- Money finishes: 2

European Poker Tour
- Title: None
- Final table: None
- Money finishes: 5

Joe Ebanks (born 1984 or 1985) is an American professional poker player from Ohio. He grew up in Kent and as of 2011 resides in Stow. He won his first World Series of Poker bracelet at the 2011 World Series of Poker where he made his first final table and had three in the money finishes. Half of his six career WSOP in the money finishes are at short-handed events, and all of them are at No Limit Texas hold 'em.

== Career ==
Prior to his success at the 2011 WSOP, his largest live event prize came in April 2009 at the European Poker Tour (EPT). That month he won the April 22 $1,309 309-player EPT San Remo – Season V No-Limit Hold'em – Event 4 for a prize of $100,842. This followed his April 1, $4,800 48-player 2009 Foxwoods Poker Classic: No-Limit Hold'em – Event 10 victory for a prize of $95,570.

Ebanks is considered a high-caliber online poker player who often final tables multi-table tournaments. More than once he has had two first-place finishes in large online tournaments in the same day including both March 19, 2011 (418-player Super Turbo NL Hold'em $250+16 for $26,125 and 446-player NL Hold'em $150+13 for $18,750) and September 10, 2010 (170-player NL Hold'em+Rebuys $100+9 for $14,450 and 712-player NL Hold'em $100+9 for $13,386) His performance of May 16, 2010, in which he won a 903-player $200 + $15 NL Hold'em event for $44,920 and finished second in a 3,497-player $200 + $16 NL Hold'em event for $80,250 is perhaps his biggest online poker accomplishment.

== World Series of Poker ==
World Series of Poker results
Year	Cashes	Final Tables	Bracelets
2010	3		
2011	3	1	1
2013	3		
2014	2		
2015	3	1	
2016	5		
2018	3		

World Series of Poker bracelets
Year	Tournament	Prize (US$)
2011	$10,000 No Limit Texas hold 'em Six Handed Championship	$1,158,481

His first WSOP in the money finish was an 83rd-place finish in the 2010 4345-player $1,000 No-Limit Hold’em Event 3 for a prize of $4,731. His first WSOP final table and World Series of Poker Bracelet was a win at the 2011 474-player $10,000 No-Limit Hold’em / Six Handed Championship Event 46 for a prize of $1,158,481. The event was one of only two non-main event million dollar first place prizes in 2011 and was the largest prize until the Pro Players $50,000 event.
