= 2011 World Series of Poker =

Series of poker tournaments

- Location: Rio All-Suite Hotel and Casino, Las Vegas, Nevada
- Dates: May 31 – July 19

Champion
- (Germany) Pius Heinz

The 2011 World Series of Poker was the 42nd annual World Series of Poker (WSOP). The WSOP is the most prestigious poker tournament in the world with the winner of the Main Event considered to be the World Champion. It was held at the Rio All Suite Hotel and Casino in Las Vegas, Nevada between May 31 – July 19, 2011. There were 59 bracelet events, beginning with the WSOP National Circuit Championship and culminating in the $10,000 No Limit Hold'em Championship (also known as the "Main Event"). The November Nine concept returned for a fourth consecutive year, with the Main Event finalists returning on November 6, playing down to three that evening and then adjourning until November 8.

== Coverage ==
The 2011 WSOP marked the first time that every event at the WSOP was covered nearly live. Due to the nature of the competition, live coverage was not allowed by the Nevada Gaming Commission. WSOP.com streamed 55 gold bracelet events on a five-minute delay via the internet. ESPN3 streamed the $25K Heads Up, $50K Poker Players Championship and the Main Event online.

ESPN also doubled the airtime given to the WSOP from prior years. For the first time ever, television coverage of the WSOP Main Event was "live" with a 30-minute delay. The "live" coverage of the WSOP Main Event ran for six consecutive days from July 14–19 and offered 32 additional hours of coverage, with Lon McEachern and David Tuchman handling the play-by-play commentary.

Poker PROductions, led by Mori Eskandani, produced the coverage of the 2011 WSOP, with the goal to enact changes that would put poker coverage on par with the coverage delivered for live sports. It was the first year for Poker PROductions producing the WSOP.

The final table of the WSOP Main Event was televised in its entirety on ESPN. As per Nevada Gaming Commission stipulations, play was broadcast with a 15-minute delay and the hole cards were not shown to the television audience until after the hand was over.

== WSOP Circuit National Championship ==
Since 1970, the WSOP was held exclusively in Las Vegas, Nevada. In 2004, Harrah's Entertainment purchased the rights to the WSOP and almost immediately started to expand the name brand. After the purchase, Harrah's introduced Circuit Events around the country. These events were intended to build up hype for the WSOP. In 2011, they introduced WSOP Circuit National Championship.

The WSOP Circuit National Championship was an exclusive tournament, limited to 100 players who qualified through the circuit events. The winner of the championship was awarded a WSOP bracelet. The event, which took place from May 27 through May 29, was won by amateur player Sam Barnhart.

== Player statistics ==
Through the first 57 events, the 2011 WSOP:

- awarded $127,468,010 in prize money.
- had 68,807 tournament entries.
- had 98 countries represented.
- had representation from all 50 U.S. states.
- had a male participation percentage of 94.7%.
- had one multiple bracelet winner.

The Main Event:

- had 6,865 entrants.
- had 85 countries represented.
- had representation from all 50 U.S. states.
- had a male participation percentage of 96.5%.
- had 4,604 participants from the U.S.
- had 2,265 participants from other countries.

== Events ==
#	Event	Entrants	Winner	Prize	Runner-up	Results	Reference
1	$500 Casino Employees No Limit Hold'em	850	Sean Drake (1/1)	$82,292	Jason Baker	Results	
2	$25,000 Heads Up No Limit Hold'em Championship	128	Jake Cody (1/1)	$851,192	Yevgeniy Timoshenko	Results	
3	$1,500 Omaha Hi-Low Split-8 or Better	925	Francesco Barbaro (1/1)	$262,283	Kostas Kalathakis	Results	
4	$5,000 No Limit Hold'em	865	Allen Bari (1/1)	$874,116	Maria Ho	Results	
5	$1,500 Seven Card Stud	357	Eugene Katchalov (1/1)	$122,909	Alessio Isaia	Results	
6	$1,500 Limit Hold'em	675	Harrison Wilder (1/1)	$205,065	Thomas Jamieson	Results	
7	$10,000 Pot Limit Hold'em Championship	249	Amir Lehavot (1/1)	$573,456	Jarred Solomon	Results	
8	$1,000 No Limit Hold'em	4,178	Sean Getzwiller (1/1)	$611,185	Sadan Turker	Results	
9	$1,500 2-7 Draw Lowball	275	Matt Perrins (1/1)	$102,105	Chris Bjorin (0/2)	Results	
10	$1,500 No Limit Hold'em Six Handed	1,920	Geffrey Klein (1/1)	$544,388	Eddie Blumenthal	Results	
11	$10,000 Omaha Hi-Low Split-8 or Better Championship	202	Viacheslav Zhukov (1/1)	$465,216	George Lind	Results	
12	$1,500 Triple Chance No Limit Hold'em	1,340	David Diaz (1/1)	$352,808	Anders Meli	Results	
13	$1,500 No Limit Hold'em Shootout	1,440	Andrew Badecker (1/1)	$369,371	Robbie Verspui	Results	
14	$3,000 Limit Hold'em	337	Tyler Bonkowski (1/1)	$220,817	Brandon Demes	Results	
15	$1,500 Pot Limit Hold'em	765	Brian Rast (1/1)	$227,232	Allen Kessler	Results	
16	$10,000 2-7 Draw Lowball Championship	126	John Juanda (1/5)	$367,170	Phil Hellmuth (0/11)	Results	
17	$1,500 H.O.R.S.E.	963	Aaron Steury (1/1)	$289,283	Michael Chow (0/1)	Results	
18	$1,500 No Limit Hold'em	3,157	Foster Hays (1/1)	$735,400	Casey Kelton	Results	
19	$2,500 Limit Hold'em Six Handed	354	Darren Woods (1/1)	$213,431	Stephanie Nguyen	Results	
20	$1,000 No Limit Hold'em	3,175	Jason Somerville (1/1)	$493,091	Yashar Darian	Results	
21	$10,000 Seven Card Stud Championship	126	Bertrand Grospellier (1/1)	$331,639	Steve Landfish	Results	
22	$1,500 Pot Limit Omaha	1,071	Elie Payan (1/1)	$292,825	Rafael Kibrit	Results	
23	$2,500 Eight Game Mix	489	John Monnette (1/1)	$278,144	Eric Buchman (0/1)	Results	
24	$5,000 No Limit Hold'em Shootout	387	Mark Radoja (1/1)	$436,568	Jeffrey Gross	Results	
25	$1,500 Seven Card Stud Hi-Low-8 or Better	606	Chris Viox (1/1)	$200,459	Mike Sexton (0/1)	Results	
26	$2,500 No Limit Hold'em Six Handed	1,378	Oleksii Kovalchuk (1/1)	$689,739	Anton Ionel	Results	
27	$10,000 Limit Hold'em Championship	152	Daniel Idema (1/1)	$378,642	Matthew Gallin	Results	
28	$1,500 No Limit Hold'em	2,500	Andy Frankenberger (1/1)	$599,153	Joshua Evans	Results	
29	$2,500 10-Game Mix Six Handed	431	Chris Lee (1/1)	$254,955	Brian Haveson	Results	
30	$1,000 Seniors No Limit Hold'em Championship	3,752	James Hess (1/1)	$557,435	Richard Harwood	Results	
31	$3,000 Pot Limit Omaha	685	Sam Stein (1/1)	$420,802	Ben Lamb	Results	
32	$1,500 No Limit Hold'em	2,828	Kirk Caldwell (1/1)	$668,276	Corbin White	Results	
33	$10,000 Seven Card Stud Hi-Low Split-8 or Better Championship	168	Eric Rodawig (1/1)	$442,183	Phil Hellmuth (0/11)	Results	
34	$1,000 No Limit Hold'em	3,144	Mark Schmid (1/1)	$488,283	Justin Cohen	Results	
35	$5,000 Pot Limit Omaha Six Handed	507	Jason Mercier (1/2)	$619,575	Hans Winzeler	Results	
36	$2,500 No Limit Hold'em	1,734	Mikhail Lakhitov (1/1)	$749,610	Hassan Babajane	Results	
37	$10,000 H.O.R.S.E. Championship	240	Fabrice Soulier (1/1)	$609,130	Shawn Buchanan	Results	
38	$1,500 No Limit Hold'em	2,192	Arkadiy Tsinis (1/1)	$540,136	Michael Blanovsky	Results	
39	$2,500 Pot Limit Hold'em/Omaha	606	Mitch Schock (1/1)	$310,225	Rodney Brown	Results	
40	$5,000 No Limit Hold'em Six Handed	732	Matt Jarvis (1/1)	$808,538	Justin Filtz	Results	
41	$1,500 Limit Hold'em Shootout	538	Justin Pechie (1/1)	$167,060	Dale Eberle	Results	
42	$10,000 Pot Limit Omaha Championship	361	Ben Lamb (1/1)	$814,436	Sami Kelopuro	Results	
43	$1,500 No Limit Hold'em	2,857	André Akkari (1/1)	$675,117	Nachman Berlin	Results	
44	$2,500 Seven Card Razz	363	Rep Porter (1/2)	$210,615	Stephen Su	Results	
45	$1,000 No Limit Hold'em	2,890	Kenneth Griffin (1/1)	$455,356	Jean Luc Marais	Results	
46	$10,000 No Limit Hold'em Six Handed Championship	474	Joe Ebanks (1/1)	$1,158,481	Chris Moorman	Results	
47	$2,500 Omaha/Seven Card Stud Hi-Low-8 or Better	450	Owais Ahmed (1/1)	$255,959	Michael Mizrachi (0/1)	Results	
48	$1,500 No Limit Hold'em	2,713	Athanasios Polychronopoulos (1/1)	$650,223	Simon Charette	Results	
49	$2,500 2-7 Triple Draw Lowball	309	Leonard Martin (1/1)	$189,818	Justin Bonomo	Results	
50	$5,000 Triple Chance No Limit Hold'em	817	Antonin Teisseire (1/1)	$825,604	Darryl Ronconi	Results	
51	$1,500 Pot Limit Omaha Hi-Low Split-8 or Better	946	David Singontiko (1/1)	$268,235	Michael Yee	Results	
52	$2,500 Mixed Hold'em	580	Matt Matros (1/2)	$303,501	Jonathan Lane	Results	
53	$1,000 Ladies No Limit Hold'em Championship	1,055	Marsha Wolak (1/1)	$192,344	Karina Jett	Results	
54	$1,000 No Limit Hold'em	4,576	Maxim Lykov (1/1)	$648,880	Dror Michaelo	Results	
55	$50,000 Poker Players Championship	128	Brian Rast (2/2)	$1,720,328	Phil Hellmuth (0/11)	Results	
56	$1,500 No Limit Hold'em	3,389	Alexander Anter (1/1)	$777,928	Nemer Haddad	Results	
57	$5,000 Pot Limit Omaha Hi-Low Split-8 or Better	352	Nick Binger (1/1)	$397,073	David Bach (0/1)	Results	
58	$10,000 No Limit Hold'em Championship	6,865	Pius Heinz (1/1)	$8,715,638	Martin Staszko	Results	

== Main Event ==
The $10,000 No Limit Hold'em Championship began on July 7 with the first of four starting days. After reaching the final table of nine players on July 19, the remainder of the tournament was delayed until November 6.

The Main Event drew 6,865 players, creating a prize pool of $64,531,000. The top 693 finishers placed in the money, with first place paying $8,715,638. The Main Event was won by Pius Heinz. There were 301 hands played at the final table, including 119 hands of heads-up play, which was the most in WSOP Main Event history.

=== Celebrities ===
Several celebrities also participated in the Main Event:

- Day 1A: Jason Alexander, Vincent Van Patten
- Day 1B: Sam Simon, Patrick Bruel
- Day 1C: Paul Pierce, Brad Garrett, Petter Northug, Audley Harrison, Shane Warne, Ray Romano, Robert Iler
- Day 1D: Jennifer Tilly, Shannon Elizabeth, Nelly, René Angélil, Mars Callahan, Colson Whitehead

Of these celebrities, Sam Simon (500th), Robert Iler (275th) and Mars Callahan (94th) finished in the money.

=== Performance of past champions ===
Name	Championship Year(s)	Day of Elimination
Doyle Brunson	1976, 1977	1A
Bobby Baldwin	1978	2A
Tom McEvoy	1983	3
Berry Johnston	1986	4
Johnny Chan	1987, 1988	2A
Phil Hellmuth	1989	4
Dan Harrington	1995	2A
Huck Seed	1996	3
Scotty Nguyen	1998	2A
Carlos Mortensen	2001	3
Robert Varkonyi*	2002	4 (514th)
Chris Moneymaker	2003	1C
Greg Raymer	2004	1A
Joe Hachem	2005	2B
Jamie Gold	2006	2B
Jerry Yang	2007	1A
Joe Cada	2009	3
Jonathan Duhamel	2010	2A

* Indicates a player who finished in the money.

=== Other notable high finishes ===
NB: This list is restricted to top 100 finishers with an existing Wikipedia entry.

Place	Name	Prize
26th	J.P. Kelly	$302,005
28th	Philipp Gruissem	$302,005
43rd	Erick Lindgren	$196,174
45th	David Bach	$196,174
55th	Sebastian Ruthenberg	$130,997
56th	Minh Nguyen	$130,997
58th	Brian Yoon	$130,997
65th	Jean-Robert Bellande	$108,412
69th	Allen Cunningham	$108,412
94th	Mars Callahan	$64,531
95th	Sorel Mizzi	$64,531

=== November Nine ===
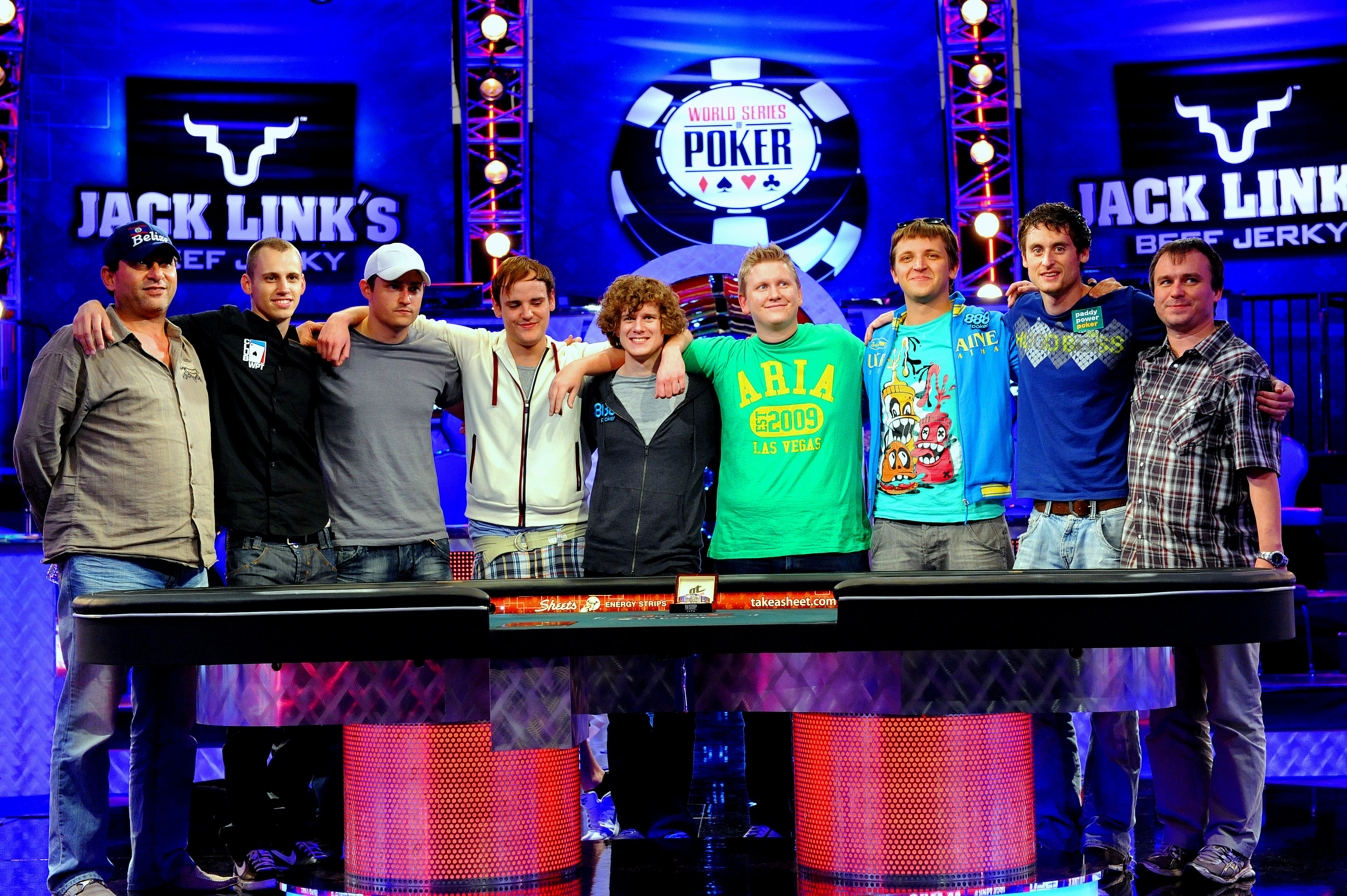
2011 November Nine

Name	Number of chips (percentage of total)	WSOP Bracelets	WSOP Cashes*	WSOP Earnings*
(Czech Republic) Martin Staszko	40,175,000 (19.5%)	0	4	$22,875
(Republic of Ireland) Eoghan O'Dea	33,925,000 (16.5%)	0	5	$37,516
(United States) Matt Giannetti	24,750,000 (12.0%)	0	10	$237,249
(United States) Phil Collins	23,875,000 (11.6%)	0	8	$48,769
(United States) Ben Lamb	20,875,000 (10.1%)	1	12	$2,157,249
(Belize) Badih "Bob" Bounahra	19,700,000 (9.6%)	0	1	$7,582
(Germany) Pius Heinz	16,425,000 (8.0%)	0	1	$83,286
(Ukraine) Anton Makiievskyi	13,825,000 (6.7%)	0	0	0
(United Kingdom) Sam Holden	12,375,000 (6.0%)	0	0	0

*Career statistics prior to the beginning of the 2011 Main Event.

=== Final table payouts ===
Place	Name	Prize
1st	Pius Heinz	$8,715,638
2nd	Martin Staszko	$5,433,086
3rd	Ben Lamb	$4,021,138
4th	Matt Giannetti	$3,012,700
5th	Phil Collins	$2,269,599
6th	Eoghan O'Dea	$1,720,831
7th	Badih "Bob" Bounahra	$1,314,097
8th	Anton Makiievskyi	$1,010,015
9th	Sam Holden	$782,115
