= Yevgeniy Timoshenko =

Ukrainian poker player (born 1988)

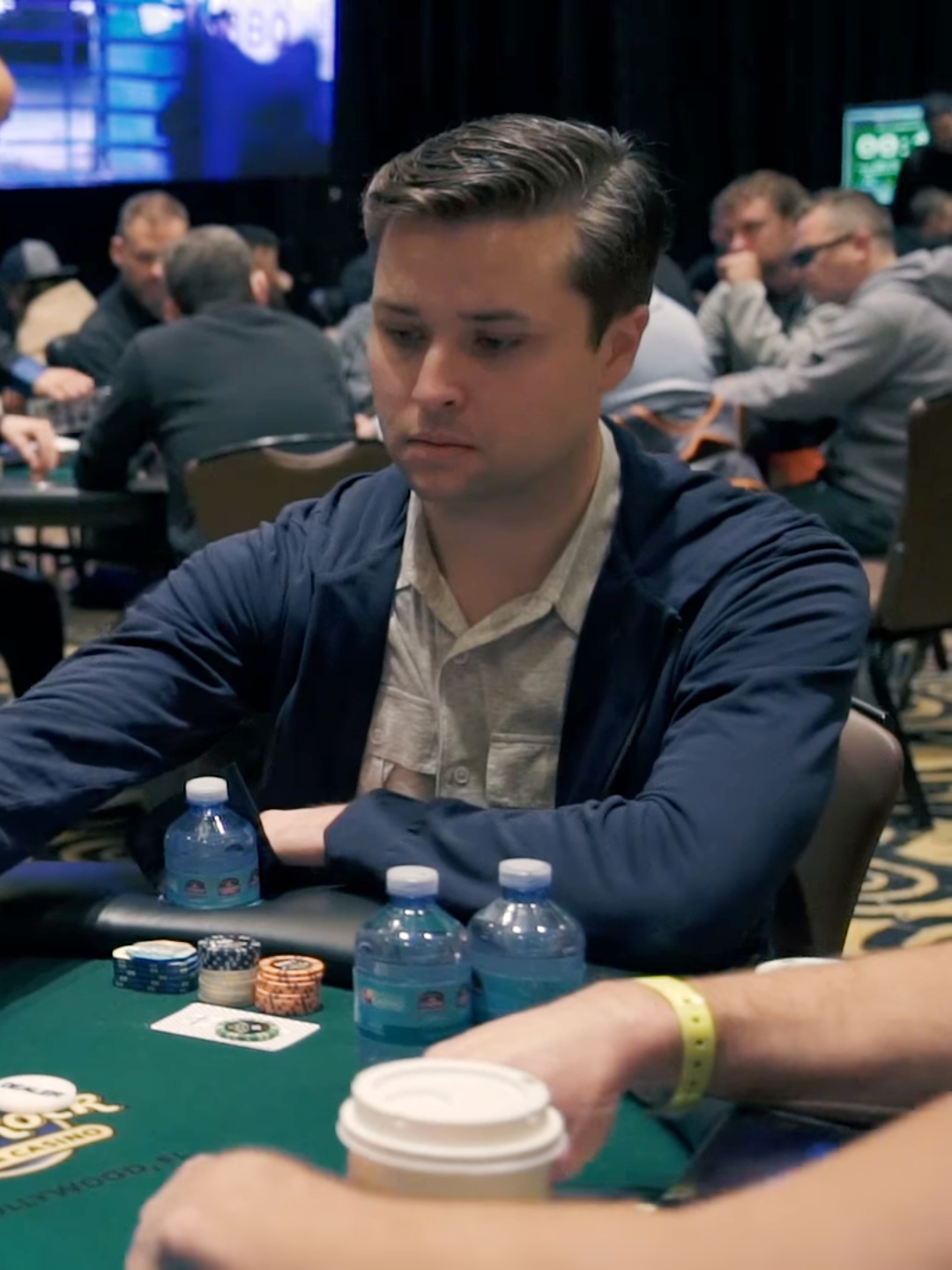
- Timoshenko at 2017 WPT Tournament of Champions
- Born: 1988 (age 37–38); Kharkiv, Ukrainian SSR, Soviet Union (now Ukraine)

World Series of Poker
- Final tables: 3
- Money finishes: 10
- Highest WSOP Main Event finish: 22nd, 2013

World Poker Tour
- Title: 1
- Final tables: 3
- Money finishes: 9

European Poker Tour
- Money finish: 1

Yevgeniy Timoshenko (Note: Ukrainian: Євген Тимошенко, romanized: Yevhen Tymoshenko) (born 1988) is a Ukrainian poker player. Timoshenko was born in Kharkiv and moved to Mukilteo, Washington, when he was 8 years old. He currently resides in Seattle, Washington.

== Live poker ==
In April 2009, Timoshenko won the season 7 World Poker Tour Championship, earning $2,149,960.

Timoshenko was previously a winner on the Asian Poker Tour in 2008, capturing a title in Macau for HK$3,812,200 (approximately US$500,000). Later in 2008, he had his first cash in the World Series of Poker, finishing in 3rd place in Event #1 in London.

At the 2011 World Series of Poker, Timoshenko finished 2nd in the $25,000 No Limit Hold'em Heads-Up Championship, earning $525,980. He finished 4th at a final table that included the eventual WSOP Main Event champion Pius Heinz at the $1,500 No Limit Hold'em event, earning himself $206,348.

At the 2013 WSOP Main Event, Timoshenko finished 22nd, earning $285,408. This Result was his thus far highest ITM finish in the $10,000 No Limit Hold'em Main Event.

Timoshenko won the Aussie Millions Super High Roller 2014 $100,000 buy in tournament in February 2014 and thus making this tournament his biggest payday for $1,791,248.

As of 2021, Timoshenko's live poker career winnings exceed $7,800,000.

== Online poker ==
Timoshenko plays on Full Tilt Poker under the alias of 'bballer88', while on Pokerstars he uses the screen name 'Jovial Gent'.

In 2009, Timoshenko won the main event of the World Championship of Online Poker. He bested a 2,144-player field to win $1,715,200. The same night he also won the weekly Full Tilt Poker $1,000 No Limit Holdem event for an additional $75,000.

As of July 2011, Timoshenko's online cashes exceed $4.7 million.
