= Mikhail Lakhitov =

Russian poker player

- Born: c. 1981 (age 44–45); Cheboksary, Chuvash Republic, Russia

World Series of Poker
- Bracelet: 1
- Final tables: 2
- Money finishes: 10
- Highest WSOP Main Event finish: 241st, 2012

European Poker Tour
- Money finishes: 5

Mikhail Lakhitov (born c. 1981) is a Russian professional poker player. In June 2011, he became one of the top 20 ranked players in the world. He has one World Series of Poker bracelet and seven career World Series of Poker (WSOP) in the money finishes, all in the time since he started playing in 2010.

== Poker career ==
He was introduced to poker while in the military by Kirill Gerasimov. Upon his discharge, he tried to become professional. He travelled Europe for much of 2010. He has four European Poker Tour main event in the money finishes. He did not know about the tradition of the World Series of Poker bracelet when he competed in 2010, but when he learned about it he promised his wife he would bring her one.

By mid-2011, following a handful of WSOP cashes, he was one of the top 20 ranked players in the world. In September 2011, Lakhitov signed a sponsorship agreement with the poker room GuruPlay Poker.

=== World Series of Poker ===
World Series of Poker results
Year	Cashes	Final Tables	Bracelets
2010	2		
2011	5	2	1
2012	3		

World Series of Poker bracelets
Year	Tournament	Prize (US$)
2011	$2,500 No Limit Texas hold 'em	$749,610

His first WSOP cash was an 8th-place finish in the 2010 1,663-player $1,500 No-Limit Hold’em / Six Handed Event 16 for a prize of $41,645. Note that since it was six-handed this eighth-place finish does not count as a final table. At the 2011 WSOP, he finished in the money with his first final table an 8th-place finish at the 865-player $5,000 No-Limit Hold’em Event 4 for a prize of $84,033. He achieved a 1st-place finish later that year, earning his first bracelet, at the 1734-player $2,500 No-Limit Hold’em Event 36 for a prize of $749,610.
