= Niklas Heinecker =

German poker player (born 1984)

- Nickname: ragen70
- Born: 17 June 1984 (age 42); Hamburg, Germany

World Series of Poker
- Bracelet: None
- Final table: 1
- Money finishes: 3
- Highest WSOP Main Event finish: 80th, 2007

World Poker Tour
- Title: None

Sven Niklas Heinecker (born 17 June 1984) known as, ragen70, is a German professional poker player from Hamburg, Germany who focuses on online draw and No Limit hold'em cash games.

== Early life ==
Heinecker was born in Hamburg and attended Gymnasium Süderelbe. He later studied at the University of Marburg.

== Poker career ==
Heinecker is an online cash game specialist. He was the biggest online cash game winner in 2013, amassing over $6,100,000 from players such as Gus Hansen and Phil Ivey. Antonio Esfandiari called Heinecker a "boss" and considered him a favorite against the top 200 poker players. In April 2014, Heinecker won $1,400,000 in three days.

Heinecker plays under the alias ragen70 on both Full Tilt Poker and PokerStars where he has earned over $7,600,000 and $2,100,000 respectively.

Heinecker also has had success in live tournaments. In 2013, he won the GuangDong Asia Millions No Limit Hold'em Main Event, earning him $4,456,885.

As of 2020, his live tournament winnings exceed $4,700,000.
