= Martin Staszko =

Czech poker player (born 1976)

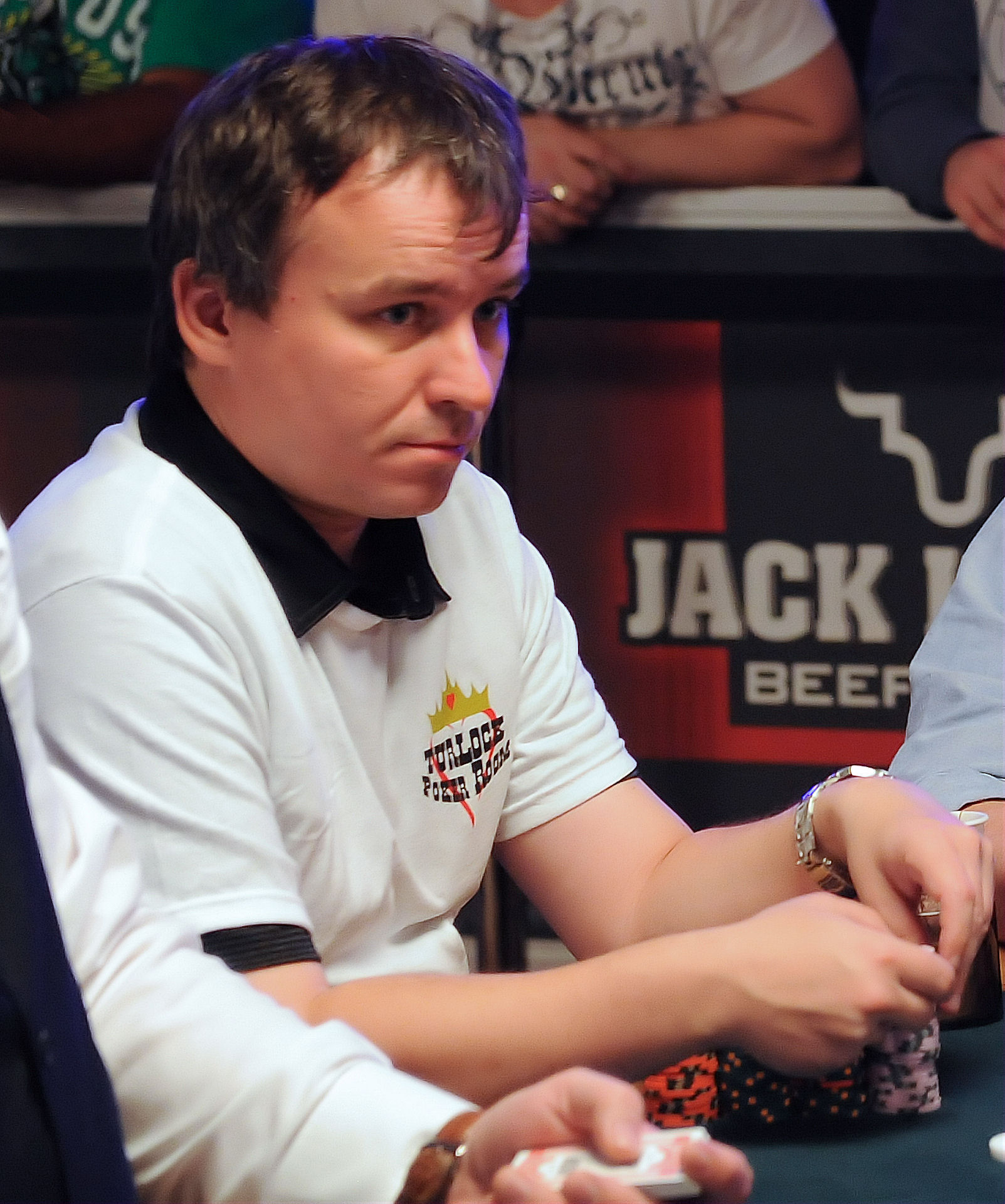
- Staszko at the 2011 WSOP Main Event.
- Nickname: filfedra
- Born: 22 June 1976 (age 50)

World Series of Poker
- Bracelet: None
- Money finishes: 13
- Highest WSOP Main Event finish: 2nd, 2011

World Poker Tour
- Title: None
- Final table: None
- Money finishes: 3

European Poker Tour
- Title: None
- Final table: None
- Money finishes: 4

Martin Staszko (born 22 June 1976 in Třinec) is a Czech poker player, best known as the runner-up of the Main Event at the 2011 World Series of Poker, where he finished second to Pius Heinz.

== Life and career ==
Staszko lives in the city of Třinec. His parents are Rudolf, who works in Třinec Iron and Steel Works, and Žofie, who works as a pharmacist.

As a child, Staszko was an athlete, becoming long jump champion of his Třinec Polish primary school. He started playing mariáš and betting on sport games during high school. Later, while studying at Technical University of Ostrava, he not only supported himself from the games, but he also saved roughly CZK400,000 (€14,000) annually. During his studies, Staszko became champion of the Czech university darts league and was also a successful chess player. After finishing studies, Staszko started working at Třinec Iron and Steel Works.

Playing chess taught me how to endure long sessions by the table. Chess also required much more preparation, which is not needed for poker. So compared to chess, poker playing is a piece of cake with much higher earnings.

He began playing poker in 2007, initially playing online in games which did not require entrance fee, but provided some very limited returns. At that time, Staszko worked as foreman at Hyundai Nošovice automobile manufacturing plant's paint shop. He was in charge of around 200 workers, earning a little over CZK 30,000 (€1,200) a month. He used to get up at five in the morning in order to attend twelve hours shifts followed by playing poker, leaving only some four to five hours for sleep. He was able to win an equivalent of six-months salary during a night online session. In 2010, following a win of €35,000 in France, Staszko decided to leave his job in order to fully concentrate on gaming.

His runner-up finish in the 2011 Main Event garnered him $5.43 million (€3.98 million).
