= Mitch Schock =

American poker player

- Born: November 14, 1971 (age 55); Billings, Montana, U.S.

World Series of Poker
- Bracelet: 1
- Final tables: 5
- Money finishes: 40
- Highest WSOP Main Event finish: 29th, 2006

Mitch Schock (born November 14, 1971) is an American professional poker player. He won his first World Series of Poker bracelet at the 2011 World Series of Poker where he made three final tables and has had at least five in the money finishes in each of the last three World Series of Poker (WSOP). Upon winning his first bracelet after several years of trying, he was quoted in The Bismarck Tribune as comparing poker with farming saying "some years are better than others."

== World Series of Poker ==
His first in the money finish was a 477th-place finish in the 2005 5,619-player $10,000 No-Limit Hold'em Championship (2005 Main Event) Event 42 for a prize of $14,135. His first final table was an 8th-place finish at a 2009 359-player $1,500 Seven Card Stud Event for a prize of $13,373. He believes himself to be the only bracelet winner from North Dakota.

World Series of Poker bracelets
| Year | Tournament | Prize (US$) |
|---|---|---|
| 2011 | $2,500 Pot Limit Hold 'em/Omaha | $310,225 |

World Series of Poker results
| Year | Cashes | Final Tables | Bracelets |
|---|---|---|---|
| 2005 | 2 | | |
| 2006 | 1 | | |
| 2008 | 2 | | |
| 2009 | 5 | 2 | |
| 2010 | 5 | | |
| 2011 | 5 | 3 | 1 |
| 2012 | 2 | | |
| 2013 | 3 | | |
| 2014 | 5 | | |
| 2015 | 3 | | |
| 2016 | 2 | | |
| 2017 | 4 | | |
| 2018 | 1 | | |

At the 2011 WSOP, he finished in 1st-place, which earned him his first bracelet, at the 606-player $2,500 Pot Limit Omaha/Hold'em Event 39 for a prize of $310,225,
