= Maxim Lykov =

Russian poker player (born 1987)

- Born: 21 September 1987 (age 39); Balashikha, Russia

World Series of Poker
- Bracelet: 1
- Final tables: 2
- Money finishes: 6

World Poker Tour
- Title: None
- Final table: 1
- Money finish: 1

European Poker Tour
- Title: 1
- Final tables: 2
- Money finishes: 3

Maxim Lykov (Russian: Максим Лыков, born 21 September 1987, in Balashikha, Russia, Soviet Union) is a professional poker player from Moscow, Russia. He has both a World Series of Poker bracelet and a European Poker Tour title. Lykov is a member of Team PokerStars Pro.

As of 2014, his total live tournament winnings exceed $3,153,000.

== World Series of Poker bracelets ==
Year	Event	Prize Money
2011	$1,000 No Limit Hold'em	$648,880
