= Ben Lamb (poker player) =

American poker player (born 1985)

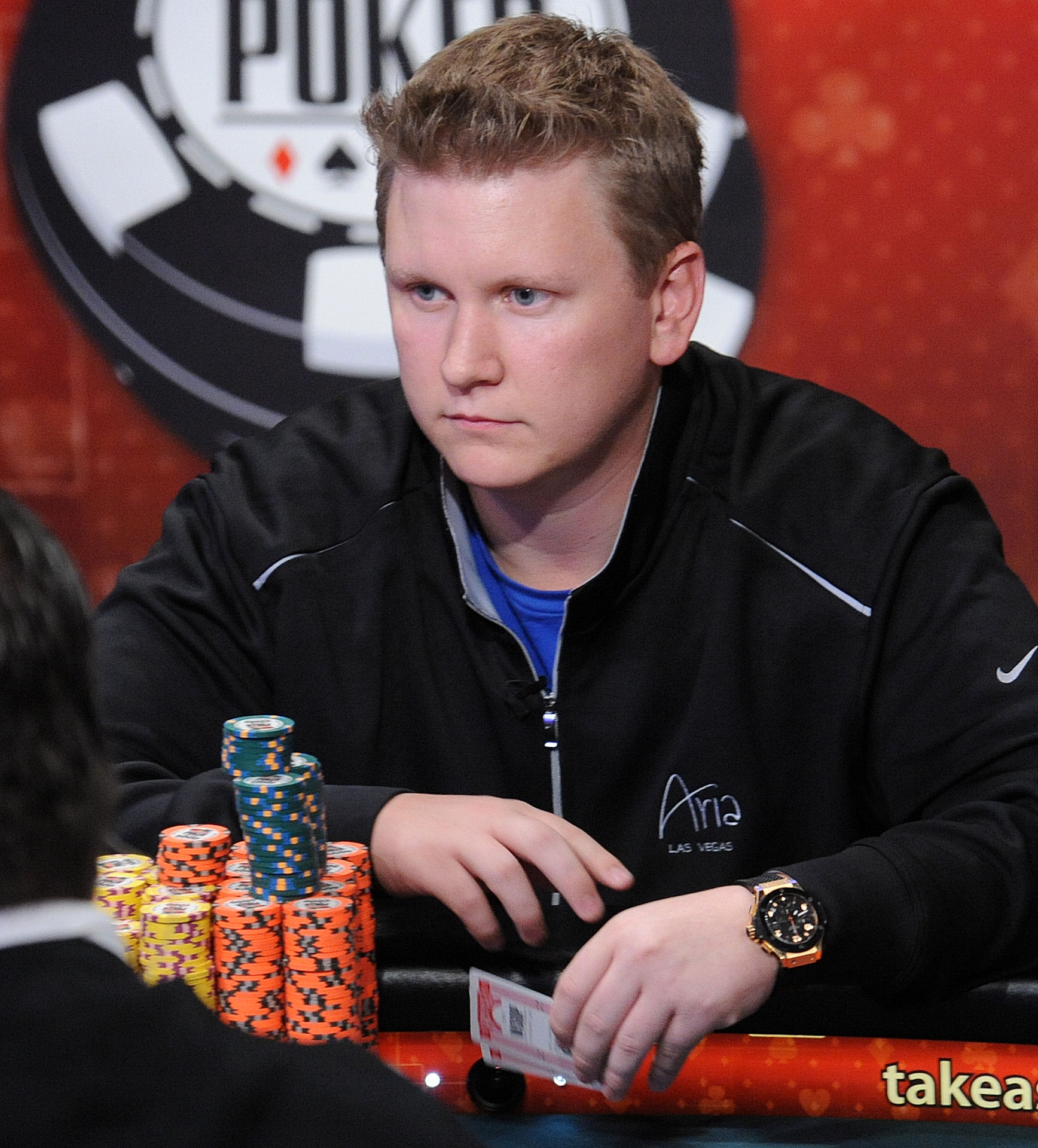
- Lamb at the 2011 World Series of Poker main event final table in 2011
- Nickname: Benba
- Born: March 31, 1985 (age 41); Las Vegas, Nevada, U.S./Tulsa, Oklahoma, U.S.

World Series of Poker
- Bracelets: 2
- Final tables: 19
- Money finishes: 47
- Highest WSOP Main Event finish: 3rd, 2011

Benjamin Lamb (born March 31, 1985) is an American professional poker player. Lamb was the 2011 World Series of Poker Player of the Year. He was also a member of the 2011 November Nine, finishing in third place in the no limit hold'em championship event. Lamb made a second WSOP Main Event final table in 2017 finishing 9th. Lamb has two World Series of Poker bracelets and 19 career World Series of Poker (WSOP) final tables, 11 in variations of Pot Limit Omaha, four in no limit hold'em and four in mixed formats. He was the winner of the 2011 Card Player Player of the Year Award.

== Early career ==
Lamb became a professional poker player in 2004. In September 2006, he won the United States Poker Championship $500 No Limit hold 'em 400-player event for a prize of $60,000. Another notable championship was his victory in the May 11, 2010, Spring Championship of Online Poker $109 No Limit hold 'em event. He outlasted a field of 4,204 competitors for a prize of $66,003. In 2011, he dominated the World Series of Poker on his way to the Card Player Player of the Year Award.

== World Series of Poker ==
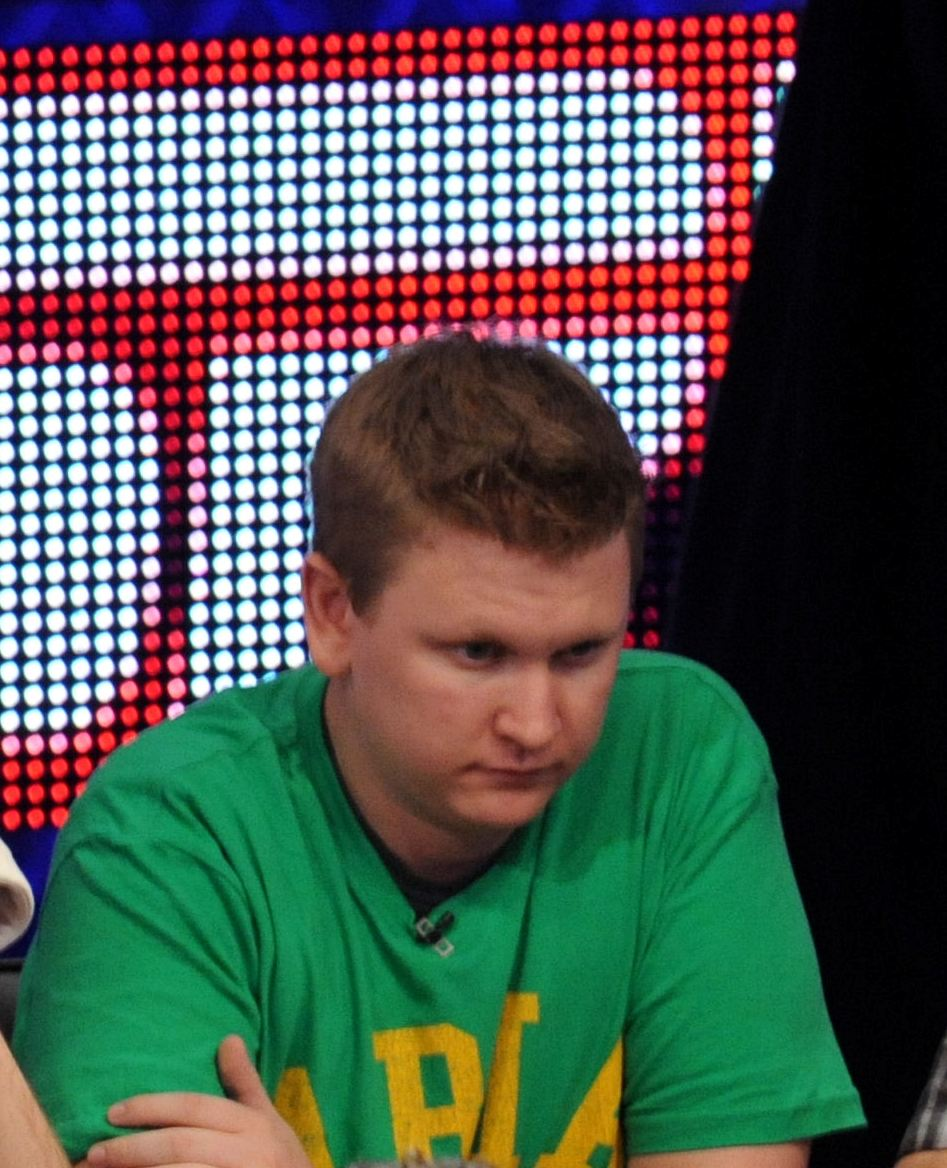
Lamb at 2011 World Series of Poker Main Event, July 2011

Prior to the 2011 World Series of Poker, Lamb's only WSOP final table was the 2010 WSOP $1500 Pot-Limit Omaha Hi-low Split-8 or Better where he was 5th in a field of 847 for a prize of $53,319. His best WSOP main event finish prior to 2011 came in 2009, when he finished 14th in the 6494-player event for a prize of $633,022.

At the 2011 World Series of Poker, he had four in the money finishes: He won a WSOP bracelet in the 361-player $10,000 Pot Limit Omaha Championship for a prize of $814,436; he finished 2nd in the 685-player $3000 Pot Limit Omaha Event 31 for a prize of $259,918; he finished 12th in the 474-player $10,000 No Limit Hold'em / Six Handed Championship for a prize of $56,140; and he finished 8th in the 128-player $50,000 Poker Player's Championship Event 55 for a prize of $201,338.

At the 2011 WSOP Main Event, Lamb was chip leader after Day 1-B, which was the second of four Day 1 starts in the tournament. He was also the overall chip leader after Day 2-B (of two Day 2 starts), entering Day 3 with 551,600 chips. On Day 6, he took the lead in the Player of the Year race and finished the day in second place in chips out of 57 remaining players. On Day 8, he qualified for the 2011 November Nine in fifth place with 20,875,000 chips. Lamb went on to finish in third place, earning $4,021,138.

In 2017, Ben Lamb again made the final table of the WSOP Main Event, outlasting 7,221 players to finish in 9th place for $1,000,000.

As of 2025, his live poker tournament winnings exceed $18,500,000.

World Series of Poker bracelets
Year	Tournament	Prize (US$)
2011	$10,000 Pot Limit Omaha	$814,436
2023	$10,000 Omaha Hi-Lo 8 or Better	$492,795

== Personal life ==
Lamb attended Jenks High School in Tulsa, graduating in 2004. He attended Trinity University in San Antonio, Texas for one semester. He is a former dealer at Tulsa's Cherokee Casino, which is now the Hard Rock Casino.
