= Bernard Lee (poker player) =

American poker player (born 1970)

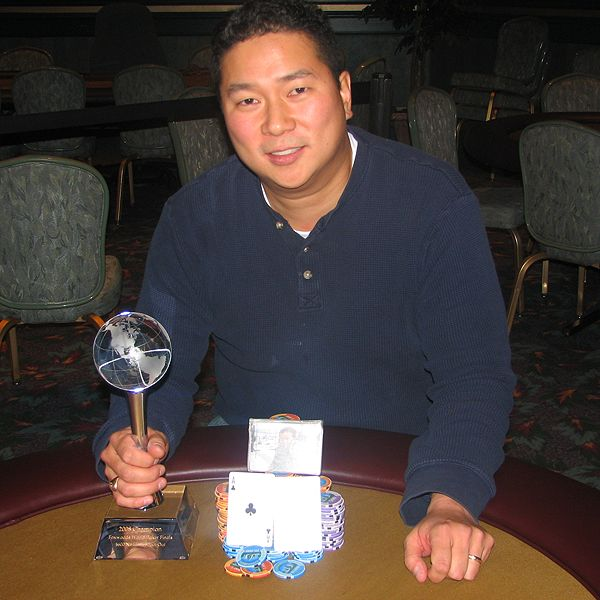
- Born: May 16, 1970 (age 56); New York City, New York

World Series of Poker
- Bracelet: None
- Final table: 1
- Money finishes: 10
- Highest WSOP Main Event finish: 13th, 2005

World Poker Tour
- Money finishes: 5

Bernard Lee (born May 16, 1970) is a professional poker player who first came to prominence by finishing 13th in the 2005 World Series of Poker (WSOP) Main Event. Since then, Lee has enjoyed some success in other poker tournaments. In October 2008, Lee won the $600 No-Limit Hold’em Shoot-out event at the World Poker Finals. This victory earned him three titles in three consecutive years as he won the $5,000 No-Limit Hold’em event at the 2006 World Poker Finals and the $2,000 No-Limit Hold’em event at the 2007 World Poker Finals. As of 2012, his live tournament winnings exceed $1,900,000.

== Media personality ==
Since September 2005, Lee has written the Sunday poker column for the Boston Herald. In April 2006, Lee joined the ESPN.com Poker website as a regular columnist. In July 2008, Lee released his first book, The Final Table, Volume I, which is a compilation of his Boston Herald columns. Based on the first book's success, Lee released his second book, The Final Table, Volume II, in December 2008. He has also been a guest columnist for several magazines.

Debuting in May 2007, Lee hosts a poker radio show in the Boston metropolitan area and on the online poker radio station Rounder's Radio. "The Bernard Lee Poker Show" incorporates interviews with poker guests including well known players and prominent industry personnel. In addition to current poker news and related information, Lee utilizes calls and e-mails from listeners to discuss poker topics and tips. Previous guests have included Pius Heinz, Jonathan Duhamel, Joe Cada, Peter Eastgate, Joseph Hachem, Greg Raymer, Chris Moneymaker, Daniel Negreanu, Phil Hellmuth, Mike Matusow, Norman Chad, Mike Sexton, Linda Johnson, JC Tran, Jonathan Little, Annie Duke, Dennis Phillips and members of the 2008, 2009, 2010 and 2011 November Nine. Over the past few years, Lee has commentated for www.worldseriesofpoker.com, ESPN360.com and the Eastern Poker Tour Championship Tournament

In November 2008, Cardplayer.com stated “While many people might think of Dan Harrington and his green Red Sox hat when they think of poker and Boston, it is really Lee who is the voice of poker in New England.”

In March 2008, Lee was the co-commentator, alongside legendary sports announcer Howard David, for the live coverage of the WSOP Circuit Main Event in Atlantic City seen on www.worldseriesofpoker.com. Since May 2008, Lee is the lead commentator for the Eastern Poker Tour Championship Tournament seen in New England on Comcast Sports Net. In June 2008, Lee was the co-commentator for the live coverage of the WSOP $5,000 preliminary no-limit hold ‘em events in Las Vegas. In June 2009, Lee was the lead commentator for the live coverage on ESPN360.com for the WSOP $10,000 world championship limit hold ‘em event in Las Vegas. In November 2010, Lee also was a guest commentator for live coverage on ESPN360.com for the WSOP main event final table.

Launched in August 2009, Lee is the co-host for ESPN.com's weekly poker show, ESPN Inside Deal. This show not only features some of the biggest players in the game and cover poker news each week, but take an in-depth look into the world of poker. Guests have included Joe Cada, Jonathan Duhamel, Pius Heinz, Daniel Negreanu, Chris Moneymaker, Phil Hellmuth, Mike Sexton and members of the 2009, 2010 and 2011 November Nine. In 2011, the show was featured on ESPN, ESPN2 and ESPN3.com during the breaks and received rave reviews.

== Teaching ==
Since 2005, Lee has been teaching poker to private students. Lee also caught the attention of the WPT Boot Camp for his teaching ability. Since then, he has taught several camps and is trained to teach both tournament and cash strategies. In 2009, Lee joined the teaching staff of the WSOP Academy as an instructor.

== Personal history ==
Lee was educated in the New England area (Harvard University BA, MA; Babson College MBA).

Lee currently lives just outside Boston, Massachusetts and is now divorced. According to his social media, Lee is dating once again.
