= Sami Kelopuro =

Finnish poker player (born 1987)

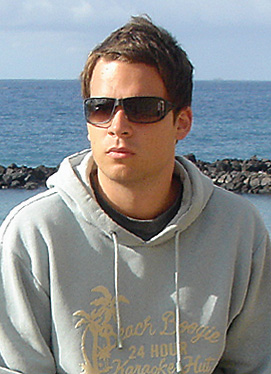
- Nicknames: LarsLuzak; Lrslzk (PokerStars)
- Born: 1987 (age 38–39); Finland

World Series of Poker
- Bracelet: None
- Money finishes: 2
- Highest WSOP Main Event finish: 111th, 2011

European Poker Tour
- Title: None
- Final table: None
- Money finishes: 2

Sami Kelopuro (born 1987 in Finland), a.k.a. LarsLuzak, is a professional poker player represented by Poker Icons.

== Early years ==
Kelopuro started to play poker cash games in late 2005 when he was invited to a home sit-and-go poker tournament. Shortly afterwards, he began playing online tournaments, sit-and-gos, cash games, heads up, shorthanded, and full ring games. He started on PAF, an online poker room belonging to the Ongame Network, where he made several deposits of €30 each and began playing $0.25/$0.50 and $0.50/$1.00 games. At the time he was just finishing high school, yet he devoted up to 10 hours a day playing online poker. Six months after graduating high school, Kelopuro joined the Finnish Defence Forces for nine months. During his service, he continued playing online poker and decided that he wanted to play poker professionally after completing his service. He made his first large profits as a cash game specialist on the poker room Betfair.

== Progress ==
Kelopuro made a major impact on the cash game scene in 2007, moving up to high-stakes no-limit Texas hold 'em and pot-limit Omaha hold 'em cash games at Full Tilt Poker, playing on limits up to $500/$1,000. He was involved in some of the biggest poker hands at the time, experiencing daily swings up to a million dollars. He is known for being one of the most aggressive and fearless cash game players in the world.

He started blogging at Coinflip, a poker website that he started with fellow Finnish poker pro Ilari Sahamies. When playing poker online, Kelopuro challenges himself by playing against some of the best poker players in the world.

He started to show results also in live poker tournaments, for a total of more than $200,000 in winnings. In May 2011 he won the Spring Championship of Online Poker Event 38-H ($10,300 No-Limit Hold’em Main Event) for $504,691.09.

In August 2019, Sami Kelopuro won $1.3 Million during 8 hours in a PLO Omaha heads-up game against an unknown player.

As of 2026, Sami Kelopuro has accumulated $1.245 million in live tournament earnings.

== Online Poker ==
Kelopuro has had the most success in playing online poker. He is one of the biggest multi table tournament winners in online poker history, cashing for $23.3 million over a number of sites.

On PokerStars, he plays under the screen name “Lrslzk”, where he collected $6.6 million in tournament winnings.

On GGNetwork Kelopuro used the alias “MiMosa1” and his real name. On that site, he collected over $13 million in MTT cashes.
