= Matthew Jarvis (poker player) =

Canadian poker player

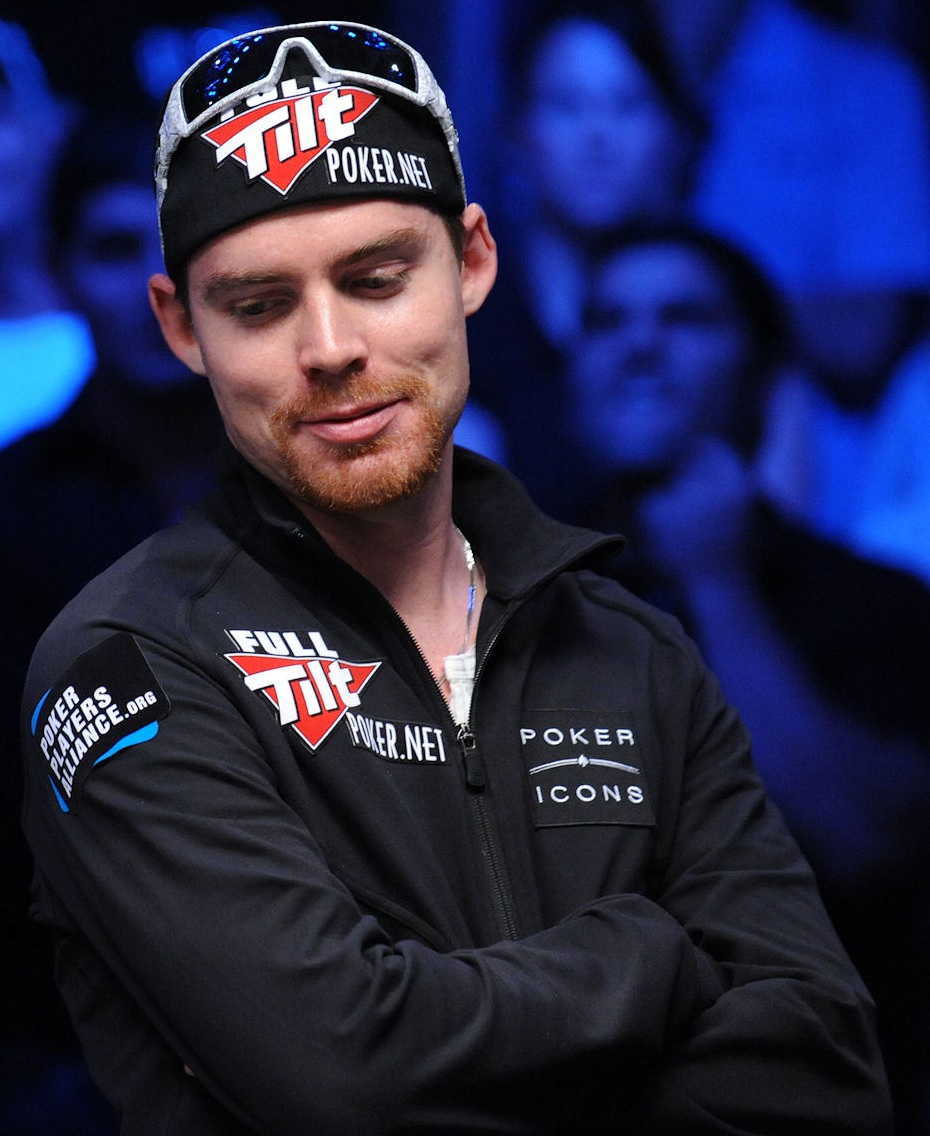
- Jarvis at the 2010 World Series of Poker main event
- Nicknames: Jarfish (PokerStars) jarfish (Full Tilt); JARFISH (Absolute Poker); Matt Jarvis (Full Tilt)
- Born: c. 1985; Richmond, BC

World Series of Poker
- Bracelet: 1
- Final tables: 2
- Money finishes: 15
- Highest WSOP Main Event finish: 8th, 2010

World Poker Tour
- Money finishes: 2

Matthew "Matt" Jarvis is a Canadian professional poker player from Surrey, British Columbia, known for his November Nine appearance in the 2010 World Series of Poker Main Event. He earned his first World Series of Poker bracelet at the 2011 World Series of Poker.

== Career ==
In 2010, he opted not to participate in most of the preliminary World Series of Poker (WSOP) events. Instead, he participated in several no limit hold 'em events at the June 2010 Venetian Deep Stack Extravaganza III, placing in the money in three of them. At the 7,319-player 2010 World Series of Poker US$10,000 World Championship No Limit Hold'em Event 57 (2010 WSOP Main Event), he entered the final table fifth in chips. During the interim between the main summer WSOP events and the November Nine final table he earned a Canadian Open Poker Championship victory in the August 23, 2010, 64-player CA$4,600 No Limit Hold'em - Heads-Up Championship, earning CA$100,000. He also had an in the money finish with a 40th place in the September 17, 2010 World Series of Poker Europe 582-player £1,075 No Limit Hold’em Event 3 for a prize of £2,747. At his November Nine appearance at the final table of the 2010 WSOP Main Event he placed 8th, earning US$1,045,743 for his first WSOP in the money finish. He was eliminated after getting 9♣ 9♥ all-in preflop, falling behind on the flop and turning a full house, but losing to a higher rivered full house against Michael Mizrachi's A♦ Q♦ when the cards ran Q♠ 8♦ Q♣ 9♠ A♠.

Jarvis plays online under the name Jarfish (with variations on the upper and lower cases at different poker networks). He has numerous five-figure online victories and in 2011 established his online career high prize with a victory in the 387-player July 23, 2011 $2000+100 Absolute Poker - UBOC16 $750K GTD High Roller No Limit Hold 'em Tournament for a prize of $193,500.

== World Series of Poker ==
World Series of Poker results
| Year | Cashes | Final Tables | Bracelets |
|---|---|---|---|
| 2010 | 2 | 1 | |
| 2011 | 1 | 1 | 1 |
| 2012 | 2 | | |
| 2013 | 1 | | |
| 2014 | 2 | | |
| 2015 | 2 | | |
| 2016 | 4 | | |
| 2017 | 1 | | |

World Series of Poker bracelets
| Year | Tournament | Prize (US$) |
|---|---|---|
| 2011 | $5,000 No Limit Texas hold 'em - Six Handed | $808,538 |

Jarvis earned his first World Series of Poker Bracelet at by winning the 732-player $5,000 2011 No-Limit Hold'em / Six Handed Event 40 for a prize of US$808,538. It was his tenth career WSOP event and the victory made him the third November Nine player, after Eric Buchman and Phil Ivey, to win a bracelet in the following year's WSOP.

== Personal ==
Jarvis was born in Richmond, British Columbia.
