= Chris Björin =

Swedish poker player

- Nickname: None

World Series of Poker
- Bracelets: 2
- Money finishes: 95
- Highest WSOP Main Event finish: 9th, 1997

World Poker Tour
- Title: None
- Final table: None
- Money finishes: 3

Christer "Chris" Björin is a Swedish professional poker player, now based in London, England. Throughout his career, Björin has kept a relatively low profile and avoided many televised poker tournaments and interviews.

== Poker career ==
Björin has been a regular at the World Series of Poker (WSOP) since the early 1990s, and has won two WSOP bracelets, one in 1997 and one in 2000.

He has also finished in the money in the $10,000 no limit hold'em Main Event in 1992, 1997, 2001, 2008, 2009, 2010, 2011, 2015, and 2018.

Björin has participated in the World Poker Tour, but has not yet made a final table. He made a final table in the first season of the Professional Poker Tour.

His highest finish in the WSOP Main Event was 9th-place finish in 1997. He also cashed multiple times at the World Series of Poker Europe including a 3rd-place finish at the 2010 WSOPE £2,650 Six Handed No Limit Hold'em event.

Björin finished 2nd in the 2012 English Poker Open taking £49,680 in prize money.

As of March 2021, his total live tournament winnings exceed $5,000,000. His 95 cashes at the WSOP account for $2,645,881 of those winnings.

As of March 2021, he is ranked as 2nd in the all time Sweden poker rankings.

== World Series of Poker bracelets ==
Year	Tournament	Prize (US$)
1997	$1,500 Pot Limit Omaha	$169,200
2000	$3,000 No Limit Hold'em	$334,110
