= André Akkari =

Brazilian poker player (born 1974)

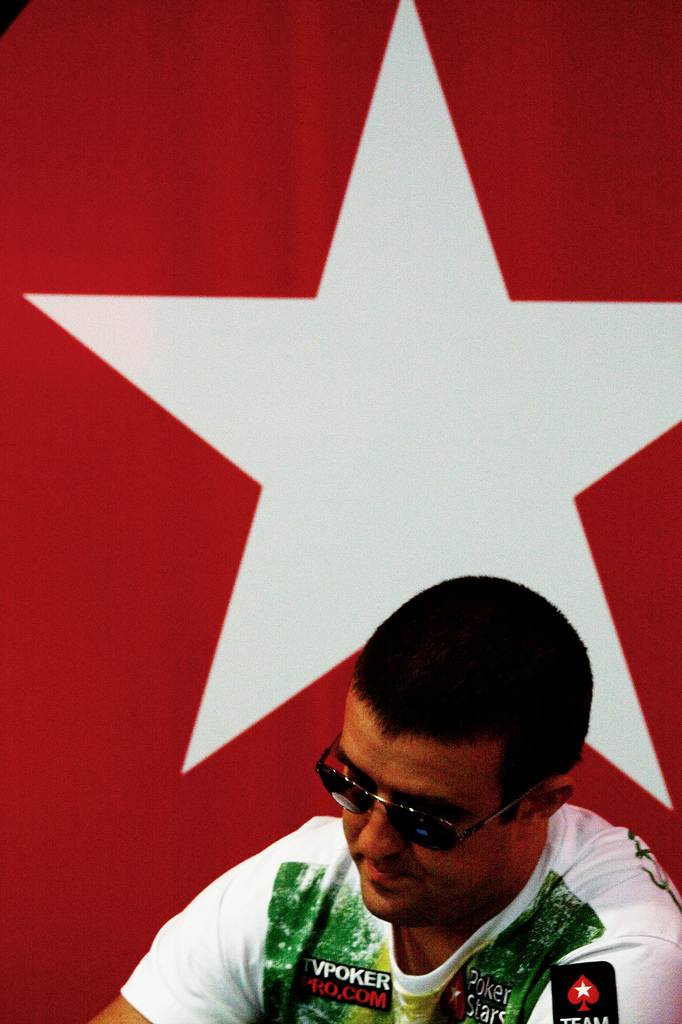
- André Akkari
- Born: 28 December 1974 (age 51); São Paulo, Brazil

World Series of Poker
- Bracelet: 1
- Final tables: 2
- Money finishes: 51
- Highest WSOP Main Event finish: 310th, 2015

World Poker Tour
- Title: None
- Final table: None
- Money finishes: 3

European Poker Tour
- Title: None
- Final table: 1
- Money finishes: 21

André Akkari (born 28 December 1974) is a Brazilian professional poker player. He is a member of Team PokerStars Pro Brazil. He won the 2011 World Series of Poker $1,500 No-Limit Hold'em event for $675,117.

He is the co-owner of Furia Esports, a Brazilian esports team.

== World Series of Poker bracelets ==
Year	Event	Prize Money
2011	$1,500 No Limit Hold'em	$675,117

As of 2015, his total live tournament winnings exceed $1,400,000.
