= Pius Heinz =

German poker player (born 1989)

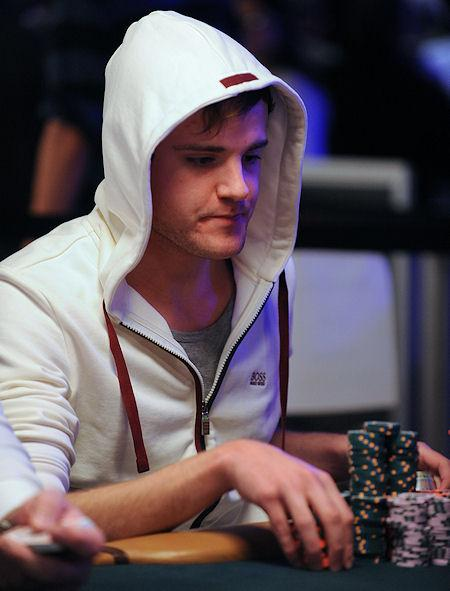
- Nickname: MastaP89
- Born: 4 May 1989 (age 37); Odendorf, West Germany

World Series of Poker
- Bracelet: 1
- Final tables: 2
- Money finishes: 5
- Highest WSOP Main Event finish: Winner, 2011

Pius Heinz (born 4 May 1989) is a German professional poker player from Bonn, best known as the winner of the Main Event at the 2011 World Series of Poker. He is the first German player to capture the Main Event bracelet.

He defeated Czech player Martin Staszko to win the event. On the final hand, Heinz's A♠ K♣ defeated Staszko's 10♣ 7♣, which did not improve on a board of 5♣ 2♦ 9♠ J♥ 4♦.

Heinz was a member of Team PokerStars.

== Personal life ==
Heinz was born in Bonn and raised in the village of Odendorf, Germany. He studied Business Psychology at the Hochschule Fresenius college in Cologne, which he put on hold in August 2011 to pursue his poker career as a part of Team Pokerstars. He is currently living in Vienna, Austria.

== Poker ==
Heinz started playing poker after watching the Main Event and High Stakes Poker on German television. After playing a few games with his friends, he decided that poker was a game of skill and immersed himself in studying the subject. He proceeded to win over $700,000 online.

Heinz won a Full Tilt Poker Sunday Mulligan in 2010 and a PokerStars $150,000 tournament in 2011.

Having developed his style online, he discovered that he "did not have a lot of experience playing live ... The live game is pretty boring and you need a lot of patience." He cashed once during his first 15 WSOP events, finishing in 7th place in the $1,500 No Limit Hold‘em event, which garnered him $83,286. That was his first ever live tournament cash. Because of the size of the field, the first day of the WSOP Main Event is split over a four-day period. Heinz registered for day 1-A so that he "could get out of there and go home as soon as possible" if he was eliminated. During the final table, his mother, who was watching the event, had left the Penn & Teller Theater because she found the tournament too stressful.

World Series of Poker bracelet
Year	Tournament	Prize (US$)
2011	$10,000 No Limit Hold'em World Championship	$8,715,638
