= 2012 World Series of Poker results =

Below are the 2012 World Series of Poker results.

== Key ==
*	Elected to the Poker Hall of Fame
(#/#)	This denotes a bracelet winner. The first number is the number of bracelets won in the 2012 WSOP. The second number is the total number of bracelets won. Both numbers represent totals as of that point during the tournament.
Place	What place each player at the final table finished
Name	The player who made it to the final table
Prize (US$)	The amount of money awarded for each finish at the event's final table or quarter-finalist and above in heads-up events.

== Results ==
=== Event #1: $500 Casino Employees No Limit Hold'em ===
- 2-Day Event: May 27–28
- Number of Entries: 732
- Total Prize Pool: $329,400
- Number of Payouts: 81
- Winning Hand: J♦ 4♦

Final Table
Place	Name	Prize
1st	Chiab Saechao (1/1)	$70,859
2nd	Patricia Baker	$43,754
3rd	James Routos	$28,206
4th	Ray Pulford	$20,663
5th	Nicolas Vaca-Rondon	$15,359
6th	Jay Pinkussohn	$11,571
7th	Steven Phan	$8,824
8th	Matthew Wilmot	$6,808
9th	Georgi Ivanov	$5,309

=== Event #2: $1,500 No Limit Hold'em ===
- 3-Day Event: May 28–30
- Number of Entries: 2,101
- Total Prize Pool: $2,836,350
- Number of Payouts: 216
- Winning Hand: A♥ 10♦

Final Table
Place	Name	Prize
1st	Brent Hanks (1/1)	$517,725
2nd	Jacob Bazeley	$322,294
3rd	Andrew Badecker (0/1)	$224,029
4th	Vanessa Selbst (0/1)	$161,345
5th	Ryan Schmidt	$117,921
6th	Abdyl Konjuhi	$87,231
7th	Michael Kaufman	$65,377
8th	J.P. Kelly (0/2)	$49,621
9th	Richard Park	$38,106

=== Event #3: $3,000 Heads Up No Limit Hold'em/Pot Limit Omaha ===
- 3-Day Event: May 29–31
- Number of Entries: 317
- Total Prize Pool: $870,870
- Number of Payouts: 64
- Winning Hand: A♣ K♣ J♥ 8♣

Final Table
Place	Name	Prize
1st	Leif Force (1/1)	$207,708
2nd	Jason Koon	$128,660
SF	Simeon Naydenov	$73,655
SF	Julian Powell	$73,655
QF	Gregg Merkow	$28,409
QF	Andy Frankenberger (0/1)	$28,409
QF	David Benefield	$28,409
QF	Annette Obrestad (0/1)	$28,409

=== Event #4: $1,500 Seven Card Stud Hi-Low 8 or Better ===
- 3-Day Event: May 29–31
- Number of Entries: 622
- Total Prize Pool: $839,700
- Number of Payouts: 64
- Winning Hand: K♠ K♣ 8♦ 4♠ 2♠ 7♣ 2♥

Final Table
Place	Name	Prize
1st	Cory Zeidman (1/1)	$201,559
2nd	Chris Bjorin (0/2)	$124,838
3rd	Brandon Shack-Harris	$84,415
4th	Yarron Bendor	$58,518
5th	Michael Mizrachi (0/2)	$41,447
6th	Xuan Liu	$29,985
7th	Todd Brunson (0/1)	$22,142
8th	Bonnie Rossi	$16,684

=== Event #5: $1,500 Pot Limit Hold'em ===
- 3-Day Event: May 30-June 1
- Number of Entries: 639
- Total Prize Pool: $862,650
- Number of Payouts: 72
- Winning Hand: 10♥ 10♣

Final Table
Place	Name	Prize
1st	Nick Jivkov (1/1)	$189,818
2nd	Bryan Pellegrino	$117,199
3rd	Jonathan Aguiar	$76,189
4th	Tommy Vedes	$55,960
5th	Daniel Negreanu (0/4)	$41,683
6th	Mike Allis	$31,452
7th	Brant Hale	$24,007
8th	John Eames	$18,529
9th	Keanu Tabali	$14,449

=== Event #6: $5,000 No Limit Hold'em Mixed Max ===
- 5-Day Event: May 31-June 4
- Number of Entries: 409
- Total Prize Pool: $1,922,300
- Number of Payouts: 44
- Winning Hand: K♠ K♥

Final Table
Place	Name	Prize
1st	Aubin Cazals (1/1)	$480,564
2nd	Joseph Cheong	$296,956
SF	Warwick Mirzikinian	$162,443
SF	Hugo Lemaire	$162,443
QF	Marvin Rettenmaier	$68,151
QF	Fabrizio Baldassari	$68,151
QF	Randy Haddox	$68,151
QF	Adam Geyer	$68,151

=== Event #7: $1,500 Seven Card Stud ===
- 3-Day Event: May 31-June 2
- Number of Entries: 367
- Total Prize Pool: $495,450
- Number of Payouts: 40
- Winning Hand: Q♠ Q♣ J♥ 10♥ 10♣ A♣ K♠

Final Table
Place	Name	Prize
1st	Andy Bloch (1/1)	$126,363
2nd	Barry Greenstein* (0/3)	$78,038
3rd	Stephen Su	$50,332
4th	David Williams (0/1)	$36,470
5th	Huu Vinh	$26,813
6th	Lee Goldman	$20,001
7th	Caroline Hermesh	$15,135
8th	Scott Abrams	$11,618

=== Event #8: $1,500 Omaha Hi-Low Split-8 or Better ===
- 3-Day Event: June 1–3
- Number of Entries: 967
- Total Prize Pool: $1,305,450
- Number of Payouts: 117
- Winning Hand: Q♣ 4♥ 10♠ 7♠

Final Table
Place	Name	Prize
1st	Herbert Tapscott (1/1)	$264,400
2nd	Gavin Griffin (0/1)	$163,625
3rd	Ashly Butler	$102,373
4th	Can Kim Hua	$74,306
5th	Michael Kleist	$54,855
6th	John Racener	$41,121
7th	Thayer Rasmussen	$31,278
8th	Raymond Davis	$24,111
9th	Bryan Jolly	$18,837

=== Event #9: $1,500 No Limit Hold'em Re-entry ===
- 5-Day Event: June 2–6
- Number of Entries: 3,404
- Total Prize Pool: $4,595,400
- Number of Payouts: 342
- Winning Hand: K♥ 10♦

Final Table
Place	Name	Prize
1st	Ashkan Razavi (1/1)	$781,398
2nd	Amanda Musumeci	$481,643
3rd	Derrick Huang	$347,228
4th	Ryan Olisar	$252,379
5th	Duy Ho	$185,378
6th	Brian Rast (0/2)	$137,632
7th	Greg Mueller (0/2)	$103,258
8th	Benjamin Reinhart	$78,259
9th	Dien Le	$59,969

=== Event #10: $5,000 Seven Card Stud ===
- 3-Day Event: June 3–5
- Number of Entries: 145
- Total Prize Pool: $681,500
- Number of Payouts: 16
- Winning Hand: A♣ Q♥ J♣ 6♦ J♦ 8♣ 9♥

Final Table
Place	Name	Prize
1st	John Monnette (1/2)	$190,826
2nd	Huu Vinh	$117,913
3rd	Timothy Finne	$73,847
4th	Perry Friedman (0/1)	$53,470
5th	Jeff Lisandro (0/5)	$41,789
6th	Mark Dickstein	$33,325
7th	Bryn Kenney	$27,062
8th	Raymond Dehkharghani	$22,332

=== Event #11: $1,500 Pot Limit Omaha ===
- 3-Day Event: June 4–6
- Number of Entries: 970
- Total Prize Pool: $1,309,500
- Number of Payouts: 117
- Winning Hand: J♣ 2♣ A♦ 7♣

Final Table
Place	Name	Prize
1st	Vincent van der Fluit (1/1)	$265,211
2nd	Charles Tonne	$164,132
3rd	Tristan Wade (0/1)	$102,690
4th	Damien Lhommeau	$74,536
5th	Alex Dovzhenko	$55,025
6th	Rodney Brown	$41,249
7th	Brian Garbe	$31,375
8th	Calvin Anderson	$24,186
9th	David Schnettler	$18,896

=== Event #12: $10,000 Heads Up No Limit Hold'em ===
- 3-Day Event: June 5–7
- Number of Entries: 152
- Total Prize Pool: $1,428,800
- Number of Payouts: 32
- Winning Hand: A♥ 4♥

Final Table
Place	Name	Prize
1st	Brian Hastings (1/1)	$371,498
2nd	Jason Mo	$229,722
SF	Brock Parker (0/2)	$130,606
SF	Tommy Chen	$130,606
QF	Chris Moore	$56,380
QF	Jeffrey Gross	$56,380
QF	Andrew Robl	$56,380
QF	Michael Drummond	$56,380

=== Event #13: $1,500 Limit Hold'em ===
- 3-Day Event: June 5–7
- Number of Entries: 730
- Total Prize Pool: $985,500
- Number of Payouts: 81
- Winning Hand: Q♦ 10♣

Final Table
Place	Name	Prize
1st	David Arsht (1/1)	$211,921
2nd	Stephen Hung	$130,903
3rd	Al Barbieri	$84,388
4th	Donald Auger	$61,820
5th	Glenn Engelbert	$45,953
6th	Ben Landowski	$34,620
7th	Jeff Weiss	$26,401
8th	Alexander Queen	$20,370
9th	Lori Kirgan	$15,886

=== Event #14: $1,500 No Limit Hold'em Shootout ===
- 3-Day Event: June 6–8
- Number of Entries: 1,138
- Total Prize Pool: $1,536,300
- Number of Payouts: 120
- Winning Hand: 8♠ 7♣

Final Table
Place	Name	Prize
1st	Brandon Schaefer (1/1)	$311,174
2nd	Jonathan Cohen	$192,559
3rd	Adam Kagin	$120,329
4th	Layne Flack (0/6)	$87,446
5th	David Chase	$64,555
6th	Michael Corson	$48,393
7th	Jeff Madsen (0/2)	$36,809
8th	Brandon Steven	$28,375
9th	Justin Schwartz	$22,168

=== Event #15: $5,000 Seven Card Stud Hi-Low Split-8 or Better ===
- 3-Day Event: June 6–8
- Number of Entries: 212
- Total Prize Pool: $996,400
- Number of Payouts: 24
- Winning Hand: J♥ J♣ 2♣ 5♦ Q♦ 3♦ 5♣

Final Table
Place	Name	Prize
1st	Adam Friedman (1/1)	$269,037
2nd	Todd Brunson (0/1)	$166,269
3rd	John Monnette (1/2)	$109,444
4th	Nikolai Yakovenko	$79,831
5th	Sven Arntzen	$59,395
6th	Zimnan Ziyard	$44,967
7th	Phil Ivey (0/8)	$34,595
8th	Bryn Kenney	$27,012

=== Event #16: $1,500 No Limit Hold'em Six Handed ===
- 3-Day Event: June 7–9
- Number of Entries: 1,604
- Total Prize Pool: $2,165,400
- Number of Payouts: 162
- Winning Hand: 6♥ 5♥

Final Table
Place	Name	Prize
1st	Matt Matros (1/3)	$454,835
2nd	Mark Radoja (0/1)	$281,502
3rd	Ramey Shaio	$182,521
4th	Gordon Vayo	$121,262
5th	Robert Muzzatti	$81,202
6th	Mark Darner	$56,300

=== Event #17: $10,000 Pot Limit Hold'em ===
- 3-Day Event: June 8–10
- Number of Entries: 179
- Total Prize Pool: $1,682,600
- Number of Payouts: 18
- Winning Hand: A♥ J♦

Final Table
Place	Name	Prize
1st	Andy Frankenberger (1/2)	$445,899
2nd	Phil Ivey (0/8)	$275,559
3rd	Ali Eslami	$199,623
4th	Alexander Venovski	$147,345
5th	Manuel Bevand	$110,731
6th	Shaun Deeb	$84,668
7th	Matt Marafioti	$65,840
8th	Daniel Weinman	$52,059
9th	Hoyt Corkins (0/2)	$41,829

=== Event #18: $2,500 Seven Card Razz ===
- 3-Day Event: June 8–10
- Number of Entries: 309
- Total Prize Pool: $702,975
- Number of Payouts: 32
- Winning Hand: A♠ 4♣ A♣ 2♣ J♠ 4♦ 10♣

Final Table
Place	Name	Prize
1st	Phil Hellmuth* (1/12)	$182,793
2nd	Don Zewin	$113,024
3rd	Brandon Cantu (0/2)	$74,269
4th	Scott Fischman (0/2)	$54,248
5th	Brendan Taylor (0/1)	$40,167
6th	Barry Greenstein* (0/3)	$30,150
7th	Michael Chow (0/1)	$22,945
8th	Jeffrey Mitseff	$17,693

=== Event #19: $1,500 No Limit Hold'em ===
- 3-Day Event: June 9–11
- Number of Entries: 2,302
- Total Prize Pool: $3,107,700
- Number of Payouts: 243
- Winning Hand: 6♣ 6♠

Final Table
Place	Name	Prize
1st	Clifford Goldkind (1/1)	$559,514
2nd	Kennii Nguyen	$347,036
3rd	Adria Balaguer	$245,197
4th	Patrick Smith	$176,299
5th	Gregg Wilkinson	$128,441
6th	Justin McGill	$94,815
7th	David Peters	$70,886
8th	Barry Shulman (0/2)	$53,669
9th	Gary Burks	$41,145

=== Event #20: $5,000 Limit Hold'em ===
- 3-Day Event: June 9–11
- Number of Entries: 166
- Total Prize Pool: $780,200
- Number of Payouts: 18
- Winning Hand: A♥ 10♣

Final Table
Place	Name	Prize
1st	Benjamin Scholl (1/1)	$206,760
2nd	Andrew Prock	$127,773
3rd	Jeff Shulman	$92,562
4th	Jesse Martin	$68,322
5th	Raymond Dehkharghani	$51,344
6th	Matt Glantz	$39,259
7th	Matthew Woodward	$30,529
8th	Nicholas Derke	$24,139
9th	Ayman Qutami	$19,395

=== Event #21: $1,000 No Limit Hold'em ===
- 3-Day Event: June 10–12
- Number of Entries: 2,799
- Total Prize Pool: $2,519,100
- Number of Payouts: 297
- Winning Hand: 10♣ 10♠

Final Table
Place	Name	Prize
1st	Michael Gathy (1/1)	$440,829
2nd	Jamie Armstrong	$273,776
3rd	Noah Vaillancourt	$193,089
4th	John Esposito (0/1)	$139,457
5th	Eric Baldwin (0/1)	$101,948
6th	Eric Davis	$75,422
7th	Jean-Louis Santoni	$56,453
8th	Jason Manggunio	$42,749
9th	Joshua Field	$32,748

=== Event #22: $2,500 2-7 Triple Draw Lowball (Limit) ===
- 3-Day Event: June 10–12
- Number of Entries: 228
- Total Prize Pool: $518,700
- Number of Payouts: 24
- Winning Hand: 9♣ 6♥ 4♦ 3♠ 2♥

Final Table
Place	Name	Prize
1st	Randy Ohel (1/1)	$145,247
2nd	Benjamin Lazer	$89,714
3rd	David "ODB" Baker	$59,925
4th	Farzad Bonyadi (0/3)	$40,987
5th	Jason Lavallee	$28,585
6th	Shawn Buchanan	$20,322

=== Event #23: $3,000 No Limit Hold'em Six Handed ===
- 3-Day Event: June 11–13
- Number of Entries: 924
- Total Prize Pool: $2,522,520
- Number of Payouts: 108
- Winning Hand: 6♠ 6♣

Final Table
Place	Name	Prize
1st	Simon Charette (1/1)	$567,624
2nd	Artem Metalidi	$350,806
3rd	Luis Rodriguez	$222,511
4th	Eddie Blumenthal	$146,053
5th	Foster Hays (0/1)	$98,756
6th	Bertrand Grospellier (0/1)	$68,738

=== Event #24: $5,000 Omaha Hi-Low Split-8 or Better ===
- 4-Day Event: June 11–14
- Number of Entries: 256
- Total Prize Pool: $1,203,200
- Number of Payouts: 27
- Winning Hand: A♠ K♦ 5♦ 2♥

Final Table
Place	Name	Prize
1st	Joe Cassidy (1/1)	$294,777
2nd	Scotty Nguyen (0/5)	$182,213
3rd	Phil Ivey (0/8)	$136,046
4th	Meng La (0/1)	$102,260
5th	Gregory Jamison	$77,342
6th	Elie Doft	$58,873
7th	Bart Hanson	$45,084
8th	Mike Matusow (0/3)	$34,748
9th	Ryan Lenaghan	$26,940

=== Event #25: $1,500 Limit Hold'em Shootout ===
- 3-Day Event: June 12–14
- Number of Entries: 366
- Total Prize Pool: $494,100
- Number of Payouts: 50
- Winning Hand: 5♠ 3♠

Final Table
Place	Name	Prize
1st	Brian Meinders (1/1)	$116,118
2nd	Darin Thomas	$71,704
3rd	Christopher Vitch	$51,861
4th	Victor Ramdin	$37,897
5th	Brock Parker (0/2)	$27,986
6th	Preston Derden	$20,886
7th	Matthew Schreiber	$15,747
8th	Sean Rice	$11,992
9th	Ian Johns (0/1)	$9,225
10th	Christopher Hartman	$7,164

=== Event #26: $3,000 Pot Limit Omaha ===
- 3-Day Event: June 12–14
- Number of Entries: 589
- Total Prize Pool: $1,607,970
- Number of Payouts: 63
- Winning Hand: 10♠ 7♠ 6♠ 4♦

Final Table
Place	Name	Prize
1st	Austin Scott (1/1)	$361,797
2nd	Brett Richey	$223,492
3rd	Vadzim Kursevich	$158,530
4th	Scott Stanko	$114,037
5th	Huykhiem Nguyen	$83,180
6th	Tom Chambers	$61,521
7th	Romik Vartzar	$46,117
8th	Dutch Boyd (0/2)	$35,038
9th	Thomas Pettersson	$26,966

=== Event #27: $1,500 H.O.R.S.E. ===
- 4-Day Event: June 13–16
- Number of Entries: 889
- Total Prize Pool: $1,200,150
- Number of Payouts: 96
- Winning Hand: Q♥ Q♠ 7♥ 8♣ K♠ 6♣ X (Stud Hi/Lo)

Final Table
Place	Name	Prize
1st	Ylon Schwartz (1/1)	$267,081
2nd	David Chiu (0/4)	$164,960
3rd	Stephen Chidwick	$112,106
4th	Robert Rasmussen	$78,021
5th	Elior Sion	$55,422
6th	John Rogers	$40,169
7th	Jason Brown	$29,679
8th	Marlon Milne	$22,358

=== Event #28: $2,500 No Limit Hold'em Four Handed ===
- 3-Day Event: June 14–16
- Number of Entries: 750
- Total Prize Pool: $1,706,250
- Number of Payouts: 80
- Winning Hand: A♣ Q♠

Final Table
Place	Name	Prize
1st	Timothy Adams (1/1)	$392,476
2nd	Brendon Rubie	$242,458
3rd	James Schaaf (0/1)	$164,823
4th	Anthony Gregg	$114,711

=== Event #29: $1,000 Seniors No Limit Hold'em Championship ===
- 4-Day Event: June 15–18
- Number of Entries: 4,128
- Total Prize Pool: $3,715,200
- Number of Payouts: 423
- Winning Hand: A♣ 10♦

Final Table
Place	Name	Prize
1st	Allyn Jaffrey Shulman (1/1)	$603,713
2nd	Dennis Phillips	$372,895
3rd	Bob Phelps	$270,727
4th	Hoyt Corkins (0/2)	$199,023
5th	Bill Stabler	$147,605
6th	Stuart Spear	$110,416
7th	William Thomson	$83,332
8th	Martin Fitzmaurice	$63,418
9th	Harold Lilie	$48,669

=== Event #30: $1,500 2-7 Draw Lowball (No Limit) ===
- 3-Day Event: June 15–17
- Number of Entries: 285
- Total Prize Pool: $384,750
- Number of Payouts: 35
- Winning Hand: 9♦ 8♣ 7♦ 4♣ 3♦

Final Table
Place	Name	Prize
1st	Larry Wright (1/1)	$101,975
2nd	Brandon Cantu (0/2)	$63,048
3rd	Andrew Lichtenberger	$41,445
4th	Michael Mizrachi (0/2)	$28,198
5th	Erick Lindgren (0/1)	$19,676
6th	Rep Porter (0/2)	$14,078
7th	Ryan Tepen	$10,318

=== Event #31: $1,500 No Limit Hold'em ===
- 3-Day Event: June 16–18
- Number of Entries: 2,811
- Total Prize Pool: $3,794,850
- Number of Payouts: 297
- Winning Hand: Q♣ J♦

Final Table
Place	Name	Prize
1st	Carter Phillips (1/2)	$664,130
2nd	Joe Cada (0/1)	$412,424
3rd	Tom Chambers	$290,875
4th	Cherish Andrews	$210,083
5th	Najib Kamand	$153,578
6th	Maxi Lehmanski	$113,618
7th	Michael Aron	$85,043
8th	Jonathan Poche	$64,399
9th	Huy Quach	$49,333

=== Event #32: $10,000 H.O.R.S.E. ===
- 3-Day Event: June 16–18
- Number of Entries: 178
- Total Prize Pool: $1,673,200
- Number of Payouts: 24
- Winning Hand: 7♠ 4♠ 7♣ 6♣ 10♠ K♠ 7♥ (Stud)

Final Table
Place	Name	Prize
1st	David "Bakes" Baker (1/2)	$451,779
2nd	John Monnette (1/2)	$279,206
3rd	Paul Sokoloff	$183,784
4th	Phil Hellmuth* (1/12)	$134,056
5th	Phil Ivey (0/8)	$99,739
6th	Abe Mosseri (0/1)	$75,511
7th	Matt Waxman	$58,093
8th	Dan Kelly (0/1)	$45,360

=== Event #33: $1,000 No Limit Hold'em ===
- 3-Day Event: June 17–19
- Number of Entries: 2,795
- Total Prize Pool: $2,515,500
- Number of Payouts: 297
- Winning Hand: 10♦ 10♥

Final Table
Place	Name	Prize
1st	Max Steinberg (1/1)	$440,238
2nd	Samuel Gerber	$273,385
3rd	Matt Stout	$192,813
4th	Dylan Hortin	$139,258
5th	Joseph Marzicola	$101,802
6th	David Nicholson	$75,314
7th	Ryan Laplante	$56,372
8th	Vitaly Meshcheriakov	$42,688
9th	Christopher Shaw	$32,702

=== Event #34: $5,000 Pot Limit Omaha Six Handed ===
- 3-Day Event: June 18–20
- Number of Entries: 419
- Total Prize Pool: $1,969,300
- Number of Payouts: 42
- Winning Hand: K♥ J♠ 6♣ Q♥

Final Table
Place	Name	Prize
1st	Naoya Kihara (1/1)	$512,029
2nd	Chris DeMaci	$316,308
3rd	Daniel Hindin	$203,369
4th	Hans Winzeler	$134,857
5th	Davidi Kitai (0/1)	$92,064
6th	Tommy Le	$64,671

=== Event #35: $2,500 Mixed Hold'em ===
- 3-Day Event: June 18–20
- Number of Entries: 393
- Total Prize Pool: $894,075
- Number of Payouts: 45
- Winning Hand: 10♦ 9♦

Final Table
Place	Name	Prize
1st	Chris Tryba (1/1)	$210,107
2nd	Erik Cajelais (0/1)	$129,766
3rd	Salman Behbehani	$93,842
4th	Joep van den Bijgaart	$68,576
5th	Michael Gathy (1/1)	$50,640
6th	Samuel Golbuff	$37,793
7th	Brent Wheeler	$28,494
8th	Phil Ivey (0/8)	$21,699
9th	Michael Foti	$16,692

=== Event #36: $3,000 No Limit Hold'em Shootout ===
- 3-Day Event: June 19–21
- Number of Entries: 587
- Total Prize Pool: $1,602,510
- Number of Payouts: 60
- Winning Hand: 8♦ 5♦

Final Table
Place	Name	Prize
1st	Craig McCorkell (1/1)	$368,593
2nd	Jeremiah Fitzpatrick	$228,261
3rd	Antonio Esfandiari (0/1)	$151,613
4th	Jonathan Lane	$112,512
5th	Athanasios Polychronopoulos (0/1)	$84,436
6th	Alessandro Longobardi	$63,988
7th	Roberto Romanello	$48,924
8th	Thiago Nishijima	$37,707
9th	Joe Tehan	$29,277
10th	Sardor Gaziev	$22,899

=== Event #37: $2,500 Eight Game Mix ===
- 4-Day Event: June 19–22
- Number of Entries: 477
- Total Prize Pool: $1,085,175
- Number of Payouts: 48
- Winning Hand: 2♥ 10♥ A♥ 6♦ 7♠ 3♠ 5♦ (Razz)

Final Table
Place	Name	Prize
1st	David "ODB" Baker (1/1)	$271,312
2nd	Greg Mueller (0/2)	$167,637
3rd	Kevin Calenzo	$106,564
4th	Joseph Couden	$76,841
5th	Donnacha O'Dea (0/1)	$56,277
6th	Konstantin Puchkov (0/1)	$41,844
7th	Christopher McHugh	$31,578
8th	Chris Viox (0/1)	$24,188

=== Event #38: $1,500 No Limit Hold'em ===
- 3-Day Event: June 20–22
- Number of Entries: 2,534
- Total Prize Pool: $3,420,900
- Number of Payouts: 270
- Winning Hand: Q♥ 10♠

Final Table
Place	Name	Prize
1st	Dung Nguyen (1/1)	$607,200
2nd	Theo Tran	$377,565
3rd	Bahman Jahanguiri	$267,241
4th	Blair Hinkle (0/1)	$192,734
5th	David Pham (0/2)	$140,736
6th	Kristijonas Andrulis	$103,995
7th	Zachary Korik	$77,791
8th	Jeffrey Manza	$58,874
9th	Tyler Patterson	$45,087

=== Event #39: $10,000 Pot Limit Omaha ===
- 3-Day Event: June 21–23
- Number of Entries: 293
- Total Prize Pool: $2,754,200
- Number of Payouts: 36
- Winning Hand: A♣ 4♠ 5♥ 2♠

Final Table
Place	Name	Prize
1st	Jan-Peter Jachtmann (1/1)	$661,000
2nd	Andrew Brown (0/1)	$408,393
3rd	Steven Silverman	$299,960
4th	Micah Smith	$222,044
5th	Andy Seth	$165,665
6th	Benjamin Sage	$124,600
7th	Nikolai Yakovenko	$94,442
8th	Jason Mercier (0/2)	$72,132
9th	Joe Kushner	$55,525

=== Event #40: $2,500 Limit Hold'em Six Handed ===
- 3-Day Event: June 21–23
- Number of Entries: 302
- Total Prize Pool: $687,050
- Number of Payouts: 36
- Winning Hand: A♥ 4♠

Final Table
Place	Name	Prize
1st	Ronnie Bardah (1/1)	$182,088
2nd	Marco Johnson	$112,525
3rd	Vincent Gironda	$73,040
4th	Brent Wheeler	$48,828
5th	Sorel Mizzi	$33,541
6th	Hans Minocha	$23,648

=== Event #41: $3,000 No Limit Hold'em ===
- 4-Day Event: June 22–25
- Number of Entries: 1,394
- Total Prize Pool: $3,805,620
- Number of Payouts: 144
- Winning Hand: 10♠ 7♥

Final Table
Place	Name	Prize
1st	Greg Ostrander (1/1)	$742,072
2nd	Jackie Glazier	$458,996
3rd	Paul Vas Nunes	$290,407
4th	Morten Mortensen	$210,793
5th	Roger Fontes	$155,498
6th	Darryl Ronconi	$116,452
7th	Joseph Chaplin	$88,481
8th	Kyle Frey	$68,121
9th	Dylan Hortin	$53,126

=== Event #42: $2,500 Omaha/Seven Card Stud Hi-Low 8 or Better ===
- 3-Day Event: June 22–24
- Number of Entries: 393
- Total Prize Pool: $894,075
- Number of Payouts: 40
- Winning Hand: A♠ K♦ 9♥ 4♠

Final Table
Place	Name	Prize
1st	Oleksii Kovalchuk (1/2)	$228,014
2nd	George Danzer	$140,825
3rd	Mark Gregorich	$90,829
4th	Daniel Ratigan	$65,812
5th	Yuval Bronshtein	$48,387
6th	Norman Chad	$36,093
7th	Wing Wong	$27,313
8th	Tim Burt	$20,966

=== Event #43: $1,500 No Limit Hold'em ===
- 3-Day Event: June 23–25
- Number of Entries: 2,770
- Total Prize Pool: $3,739,500
- Number of Payouts: 297
- Winning Hand: 4♣ 4♥

Final Table
Place	Name	Prize
1st	Henry Lu (1/1)	$654,380
2nd	Neil Channing	$406,409
3rd	James Mackey (0/1)	$286,633
4th	Tom Alner	$207,019
5th	John Nelson	$151,338
6th	Hovan Nguyen	$111,961
7th	Balazs Botond	$83,802
8th	Francois Dur	$63,459
9th	Jared Rosenbaum	$48,614

=== Event #44: $1,000 No Limit Hold'em ===
- 3-Day Event: June 24–26
- Number of Entries: 2,949
- Total Prize Pool: $2,654,100
- Number of Payouts: 297
- Winning Hand: A♦ 9♦

Final Table
Place	Name	Prize
1st	Rocco Palumbo (1/1)	$464,464
2nd	Nelson Robinson	$288,448
3rd	Thomas Conway	$203,437
4th	Niel Mittelman	$146,931
5th	Jason Everett	$107,411
6th	Kevin Elia	$79,464
7th	Anke Berner	$59,478
8th	Patrick Karschamroon	$45,040
9th	David Forster	$34,503

=== Event #45: $50,000 The Poker Players Championship ===
- 5-Day Event: June 24–28
- Number of Entries: 108
- Total Prize Pool: $5,184,000
- Number of Payouts: 16
- Winning Hand: Q♦ J♣ 9♥ 8♥ (Omaha-8)

Final Table
Place	Name	Prize
1st	Michael Mizrachi (1/3)	$1,451,527
2nd	Chris Klodnicki	$896,935
3rd	Andy Bloch (1/1)	$561,738
4th	Luke Schwartz	$406,736
5th	Roland Israelashvili	$317,882
6th	Stephen Chidwick	$253,497
7th	Bill Chen (0/2)	$205,856
8th	Bruno Fitoussi	$169,879

=== Event #46: $2,500 No Limit Hold'em ===
- 3-Day Event: June 25–27
- Number of Entries: 1,607
- Total Prize Pool: $3,655,925
- Number of Payouts: 171
- Winning Hand: A♥ Q♥

Final Table
Place	Name	Prize
1st	Joey Weissman (1/1)	$694,609
2nd	Jeremy Quehen	$429,535
3rd	Fernando Brito	$282,676
4th	Philip Meulyzer	$203,781
5th	Bradley Lipsey	$149,162
6th	Joe Gualtieri	$110,775
7th	Michael Gagliano	$83,428
8th	Joshua Pedraza	$63,686
9th	Konstantin Puchkov (0/1)	$49,245

=== Event #47: $1,500 Pot Limit Omaha Hi-Low Split-8 or Better ===
- 3-Day Event: June 26–28
- Number of Entries: 978
- Total Prize Pool: $1,320,300
- Number of Payouts: 117
- Winning Hand: A♥ 7♥ 4♦ 3♦

Final Table
Place	Name	Prize
1st	Steven Loube (1/1)	$267,345
2nd	Timothy Finne	$165,486
3rd	Roch Cousineau	$103,538
4th	Cameron McKinley	$75,151
5th	Charalampos Lappas	$55,479
6th	Sonu Sharma	$41,589
7th	Paul Taylor	$31,634
8th	Kyle Carlston	$24,386
9th	Paul Ewen	$19,052

=== Event #48: $3,000 Limit Hold'em ===
- 3-Day Event: June 26–28
- Number of Entries: 247
- Total Prize Pool: $674,310
- Number of Payouts: 27
- Winning Hand: K♣ 9♣

Final Table
Place	Name	Prize
1st	Kenny Hsiung (1/1)	$165,205
2nd	Robert Hwang	$102,118
3rd	John Virtue	$76,244
4th	Paul Berende	$57,310
5th	Dwyte Pilgrim	$43,345
6th	Matthew Woodward	$32,994
7th	Mitchell Davis	$25,266
8th	John Myung	$19,474
9th	Stephen Hung	$15,098

=== Event #49: $1,500 Ante Only No Limit Hold'em ===
- 3-Day Event: June 27–29
- Number of Entries: 939
- Total Prize Pool: $1,267,650
- Number of Payouts: 117
- Winning Hand: 7♥ 7♦

Final Table
Place	Name	Prize
1st	Greg Hobson (1/1)	$256,691
2nd	Mike Sowers	$158,887
3rd	John Hayes	$99,409
4th	Harrison Gimbel	$72,155
5th	Eugene Du Plessis	$53,267
6th	Mike McDonald	$39,931
7th	Seth Davies	$30,373
8th	Sameer Aljanedi	$23,413
9th	Justin Schwartz	$18,292

=== Event #50: $5,000 No Limit Hold'em ===
- 4-Day Event: June 28-July 1
- Number of Entries: 1,001
- Total Prize Pool: $4,704,700
- Number of Payouts: 117
- Winning Hand: A♣ J♠

Final Table
Place	Name	Prize
1st	Pete Vilandos (1/3)	$952,694
2nd	Kyle Julius	$589,687
3rd	Dan Smith	$368,943
4th	Kevin Schulz	$267,792
5th	Derek Gregory	$197,691
6th	Thomas Conway	$148,198
7th	Matt Giannetti	$112,725
8th	Tommy Vedes	$86,896
9th	Amir Lehavot (0/1)	$67,889

=== Event #51: $1,000 Ladies No Limit Hold'em Championship ===
- 3-Day Event: June 29-July 1
- Number of Entries: 936
- Total Prize Pool: $842,400
- Number of Payouts: 117
- Winning Hand: Q♠ 7♠

Final Table
Place	Name	Prize
1st	Yen Dang (1/1)	$170,587
2nd	Debbie Pechac	$105,586
3rd	Janet Howard	$66,061
4th	Angela Moed	$47,949
5th	Candida Ross-Powers	$35,398
6th	Rae Rocco	$26,536
7th	Lesley Amos	$20,184
8th	Freda Lawrence	$15,559
9th	Anna Lundholm	$12,156

=== Event #52: $2,500 10-Game Mix Six Handed ===
- 3-Day Event: June 29-July 1
- Number of Entries: 421
- Total Prize Pool: $957,775
- Number of Payouts: 48
- Winning Hand: 7♦ 5♣ 4♠ 3♠ 2♥ (2-7 Triple Draw)

Final Table
Place	Name	Prize
1st	Vanessa Selbst (1/2)	$244,259
2nd	Michael Saltzburg (0/1)	$150,849
3rd	Tam Hang	$97,884
4th	Chris Bjorin (0/2)	$64,649
5th	Thomas Chambers	$43,099
6th	Mike Gorodinsky	$30,169

=== Event #53: $1,500 No Limit Hold'em ===
- 4-Day Event: June 30-July 3
- Number of Entries: 3,166
- Total Prize Pool: $4,274,100
- Number of Payouts: 324
- Winning Hand: J♠ 6♠

Final Table
Place	Name	Prize
1st	Neil Willerson (1/1)	$737,248
2nd	Vladimir Mefodichev	$456,217
3rd	Hugh Henderson	$322,866
4th	Zachary Humphrey	$233,708
5th	Matthew Graham	$171,135
6th	Hai Chu	$126,770
7th	Bryan Piccioli	$94,971
8th	Randy Ashe	$71,933
9th	Ryan Hughes (0/2)	$55,093

=== Event #54: $1,000 No Limit Hold'em ===
- 4-Day Event: July 1–4
- Number of Entries: 3,221
- Total Prize Pool: $2,898,900
- Number of Payouts: 324
- Winning Hand: A♣ 2♠

Final Table
Place	Name	Prize
1st	Will Jaffe (1/1)	$500,075
2nd	Luis Campelo	$309,429
3rd	Joseph Kuether	$218,983
4th	Nghi Van Tran	$158,512
5th	Ken Fishman	$116,072
6th	Jason Tompkins	$85,981
7th	Muhamet Perati	$64,414
8th	Benjamin Grise	$48,788
9th	Jeffrey Fielder	$37,367

=== Event #55: $1,000,000 The Big One for One Drop ===
- 3-Day Event: July 1–3
- Number of Entries: 48
- Total Prize Pool: $42,666,672
- Number of Payouts: 9
- Winning Hand: 7♦ 5♠

Final Table
Place	Name	Prize
1st	Antonio Esfandiari (1/2)	$18,346,673
2nd	Sam Trickett	$10,112,001
3rd	David Einhorn	$4,352,000
4th	Phil Hellmuth* (1/12)	$2,645,333
5th	Guy Laliberté	$1,834,666
6th	Brian Rast (0/2)	$1,621,333
7th	Bobby Baldwin* (0/4)	$1,408,000
8th	Richard Yong	$1,237,333

=== Event #56: $1,500 No Limit Hold'em ===
- 3-Day Event: July 2–4
- Number of Entries: 2,798
- Total Prize Pool: $3,777,300
- Number of Payouts: 297
- Winning Hand: 10♦ 10♥

Final Table
Place	Name	Prize
1st	Tomas Junek (1/1)	$661,022
2nd	David Borg	$410,517
3rd	Donald Vogel	$289,530
4th	Peter Eastgate (0/1)	$209,111
5th	Eliyahu Levy	$152,867
6th	Andrew Taylor	$113,092
7th	Steven Goldberg	$84,649
8th	Tomas Trampota	$64,101
9th	Bassel Moussa	$49,105

=== Event #57: $10,000 No Limit Hold'em Six Handed ===
- 4-Day Event: July 3–6
- Number of Entries: 474
- Total Prize Pool: $4,455,600
- Number of Payouts: 48
- Winning Hand: K♠ 9♠

Final Table
Place	Name	Prize
1st	Greg Merson (1/1)	$1,136,197
2nd	Keith Lehr (0/1)	$701,757
3rd	Shannon Shorr	$455,362
4th	Eddy Sabat	$300,753
5th	Christopher Brammer	$200,502
6th	Andrew Lichtenberger	$140,351

=== Event #58: $3,000 Pot Limit Omaha Hi-Low Split-8 or Better ===
- 4-Day Event: July 3–6
- Number of Entries: 526
- Total Prize Pool: $1,435,980
- Number of Payouts: 54
- Winning Hand: A♣ 5♥ J♥ 2♦

Final Table
Place	Name	Prize
1st	Viacheslav Zhukov (1/2)	$330,277
2nd	Roch Cousineau	$204,426
3rd	Chris Bell (0/1)	$135,858
4th	David "ODB" Baker (1/1)	$100,820
5th	Randy Ohel (1/1)	$75,662
6th	Yuval Bronshtein	$57,339
7th	Jack Ernest Ward	$43,840
8th	Scotty Nguyen (0/5)	$33,789
9th	Juan Ramirez	$26,235

=== Event #59: $1,000 No Limit Hold'em ===
- 4-Day Event: July 4–7
- Number of Entries: 4,620
- Total Prize Pool: $4,158,000
- Number of Payouts: 468
- Winning Hand: K♠ 5♠

Final Table
Place	Name	Prize
1st	Dominik Nitsche (1/1)	$654,797
2nd	Jonathan Hilton	$405,156
3rd	Alex Cordero	$291,725
4th	Sebastien Comel	$215,592
5th	Randolph Lanosga	$160,665
6th	Franklin Johnson	$120,748
7th	Martin Vallo	$91,476
8th	Jonathan Miller	$69,896
9th	Daniel Eichhorn	$53,846

=== Event #60: $10,000 2-7 Draw Lowball (No Limit) ===
- 3-Day Event: July 5–7
- Number of Entries: 101
- Total Prize Pool: $949,400
- Number of Payouts: 14
- Winning Hand: 9 8 7 6 3

Final Table
Place	Name	Prize
1st	Nick Schulman (1/2)	$294,321
2nd	Mike Wattel (0/1)	$181,886
3rd	George Danzer	$115,295
4th	Benjamin Parker	$78,088
5th	Ashton Griffin	$55,482
6th	John Juanda (0/5)	$41,270
7th	Bob Bright	$32,080

=== Event #61: $10,000 No Limit Hold'em Main Event ===
- 10-Day Event: July 7–16
- Final Table: October 29–30
- Number of Entries: 6,598
- Total Prize Pool: $62,021,200
- Number of Payouts: 666
- Winning Hand: K♦ 5♦

Final Table
Place	Name	Prize
1st	Greg Merson (2/2)	$8,531,853
2nd	Jesse Sylvia	$5,295,149
3rd	Jacob Balsiger	$3,799,073
4th	Russell Thomas	$2,851,537
5th	Jeremy Ausmus	$2,155,313
6th	Andras Koroknai	$1,640,902
7th	Michael Esposito	$1,258,040
8th	Robert Salaburu	$971,360
9th	Steve Gee (0/1)	$754,798
