= 2012 World Series of Poker Europe results =

Below are the results for the 2012 World Series of Poker Europe.

== Key ==
*	Elected to the Poker Hall of Fame
(#/#)	This denotes a bracelet winner. The first number is the number of bracelets won in 2012. The second number is the total number of bracelets won. Both numbers represent totals as of that point during the tournament.
Place	What place each player finished
Name	The player who made it to the final table
Prize (€)	The amount of money, in Euros (€), awarded for each finish at the event's final table

== Results ==
=== Event 1: €2,700 Six Handed No Limit Hold'em ===
- 3-Day Event: September 21–23
- Number of buy-ins: 227
- Total Prize Pool: €544,800
- Number of Payouts: 24
- Winning Hand: J♠ J♣

Final Table
Place	Name	Prize
1st	Imed Ben Mahmoud (1/1)	€147,099
2nd	Yannick Bonnet	€90,884
3rd	Matan Kraków	€63,671
4th	Senh Ung	€44,913
5th	Roberto Romanello	€31,925
6th	Sylvain Ribes	€22,876

=== Event 2: €1,100 No Limit Hold'em ===
- 4-Day Event: September 22–25
- Number of buy-ins: 626
- Total Prize Pool: €600,960
- Number of Payouts: 63
- Winning Hand: Q♣ 8♦

Final Table
Place	Name	Prize
1st	Antonio Esfandiari (2/3)	€126,207
2nd	Remi Bollengier	€78,059
3rd	Salvatore Bonavena	€57,079
4th	Antonin Teisseire (0/1)	€42,356
5th	Valentin Detoc	€31,869
6th	McLean Karr	€24,309
7th	Ashly Butler	€18,798
8th	Jamel Haddad	€14,736
9th	Florian Ciuro	€11,707

=== Event 3: €5,300 Pot Limit Omaha ===
- 3-Day Event: September 24–26
- Number of buy-ins: 97
- Total Prize Pool: €475,300
- Number of Payouts: 12
- Winning Hand: 5♣ 2♣ K♠ 3♥

Final Table
Place	Name	Prize
1st	Roger Hairabedian (1/1)	€142,590
2nd	Ville Mattila	€88,130
3rd	Michael Mizrachi (1/3)	€62,749
4th	Jussi Ryynanen	€45,581
5th	Jussi Nevanlinna	€33,765
6th	Joe Hachem (0/1)	€25,490
7th	Michel Abecassis	€19,606
8th	Michael Schwartz	€15,357
9th	Jason Mercier (0/2)	€12,245

=== Event 4: €3,250 No Limit Hold'em Shootout ===
- 3-Day Event: September 25–27
- Number of buy-ins: 141
- Total Prize Pool: €406,080
- Number of Payouts: 20
- Winning Hand: Q♣ Q♦

Final Table
Place	Name	Prize
1st	Giovanni Rosadoni (1/1)	€107,614
2nd	Dan O'Brien	€66,503
3rd	John Monnette (1/2)	€48,177
4th	Oleksii Kovalchuk (1/2)	€35,560
5th	Adrien Allain	€26,724
6th	Paul Guichard	€20,434
7th	Roman Romanovskyi	€15,890
8th	Trond Aanensen	€12,564
9th	John Duthie	€10,095
10th	Valentin Messina	€8,239

=== Event 5: €10,450 Mixed Max No Limit Hold'em ===
- 4-Day Event: September 26–29
- Number of buy-ins: 96
- Total Prize Pool: €921,600
- Number of Payouts: 16
- Winning Hand: A♣ K♣

Final Table
Place	Name	Prize
1st	Jonathan Aguiar (1/1)	€258,047
2nd	Brandon Cantu (0/2)	€159,459
SF	Roger Hairabedian (1/1)	€86,087
SF	Faraz Jaka	€86,087
QF	Konstantin Puchkov (0/1)	€42,094
QF	Marvin Rettenmaier	€42,094
QF	Martin Jacobson	€42,094
QF	Kristijonas Andrulis	€42,094

=== Event 6: €1,650 Six Handed Pot Limit Omaha ===
- 3-Day Event: September 27–29
- Number of buy-ins: 206
- Total Prize Pool: €302,820
- Number of Payouts: 21
- Winning Hand: 10♠ 9♣ 7♦ 6♥

Final Table
Place	Name	Prize
1st	Francisco Da Costa Santos (1/1)	€83,275
2nd	Ana Marquez	€51,443
3rd	Aku Joentausta	€36,351
4th	Petteri Kalenius	€25,831
5th	Andrew Lichtenberger	€18,463
6th	Nikolay Volper	€13,273

=== Event 7: €10,450 No Limit Hold'em Main Event ===
- 6-Day Event: September 29-October 4
- Number of buy-ins: 420
- Total Prize Pool: €4,032,000
- Number of Payouts: 48
- Winning Hand: A♥ 10♦

Final Table
Place	Name	Prize
1st	Phil Hellmuth* (2/13)	€1,058,403
2nd	Sergii Baranov	€624,557
3rd	Stephane Albertini	€423,360
4th	Joseph Cheong	€292,320
5th	Christopher Brammer	€207,648
6th	Paul Tedeschi	€149,184
7th	Stephane Girault	€108,864
8th	Jason Mercier (0/2)	€84,672
