= Konstantin Puchkov =

Russian poker player (born 1952)

- Born: 1952 (age 73–74)

World Series of Poker
- Bracelet: 1
- Final tables: 8
- Money finishes: 55
- Highest WSOP Main Event finish: none

World Poker Tour
- Title: None
- Final table: 1
- Money finishes: 2

European Poker Tour
- Title: None
- Final tables: 2
- Money finishes: 9

Konstantin Puchkov (born 1952) is a Russian poker player, horse trainer and horse breeder from Moscow. He was the fourth Russian-born player to earn a World Series of Poker bracelet. He is best known for having earned a WSOP bracelet in his first World Series of Poker in the money finish (2010 World Series of Poker Event #31: H.O.R.S.E., $1,500 buy-in) and setting the record for most in the money finishes at one series during the 2012 World Series of Poker (11).

Puchkov had gone cashless in three prior World Series of Poker Series, including 21 events in 2009 prior to winning a bracelet in his first in the money finish. He claims his 21 events without cashing is a record. He also says that at both the 2007 and 2008 World Series of Poker, he only played in the main event. He names all the horses that he breeds after poker terms. According to his World Poker Tour profile, he began playing poker exclusively in Russia, before playing internationally in 2007.

== World Series of Poker ==
World Series of Poker results
Year	Cashes	Final Tables	Bracelets
2010	3	1	1
2011	3		
2012	11	2	
2012 E	1	1	
2013	6	2	
2013E	1		
2014	5	1	
2015	4	1	
2015 E	2		
2016	10		
2017	5		
2018	4		

=== Bracelets ===
On 19 June, Puchkov defeated "Sugar Bear" Al Barbieri heads up to win his first WSOP bracelet in 2010 World Series of Poker Event 31. Other final tablists in the event included Ken Lennaárd and Robert Mizrachi

World Series of Poker bracelets
Year	Tournament	Prize (US$)
2010	$1,500 H.O.R.S.E.	$256,820

=== 2012 World Series of Poker ===
At the 2012 World Series of Poker, Puchkov finished in the money 11 times in the series, which is a record. In his 11 in the money finishes, Puchkov totaled $173,382 in prize money and reached 2 final tables. His eleventh cash came while playing events 59 and 60 simultaneously. In setting the record, he surpassed fellow Russian Nikolay Evdakov. Although he began play on 6 July as the chip leader in event #60: $10,000 2-7 Lowball (No-Limit), he made his eleventh in the money finish in event 59.

Record-setting 2012 World Series of Poker
Event #	Tournament	Prize (US$)	Place	Field
Event #5	$1,500 Pot-Limit Hold'em	$2,846	56th	639
Event #6	$5,000 No-Limit Hold'em Mixed Max	$14,328	26th	409
Event #14	$1,500 No-Limit Hold'em Shootout (2,000 player max)	$5,295	56th	1138
Event #30	$1,500 2-7 Draw Lowball (No-Limit)	$5,955	11th	285
Event #33	$1,000 No-Limit Hold'em	$2,214	199th	2795
Event #35	$2,500 Mixed Hold'em (Limit/No-Limit)	$6,437	20th	393
Event #37	$2,500 Eight Game Mix	$41,844	6th	477
Event #44	$1,000 No-Limit Hold'em	$2,123	214th	2949
Event #46	$2,500 No-Limit Hold'em	$49,245	9th	1607
Event #50	$5,000 No-Limit Hold'em	$43,095	14th	1001
Event #59	$1,000 No-Limit Hold'em	$2,079	381st	4620

Puchkov also made a final table at the €10,450 Mixed Max No Limit Hold'em 2012 World Series of Poker Europe Event 5.
