= Italian Poker Tour season 3 results =

Season 3 of Italian Series of poker tournaments sponsored by PokerStars

== Season 3 ==
Below are the results of the third season of the Italian Poker Tour (IPT) sponsored by PokerStars. For this season, there will be nine stages between the cities of Campione d'Italia, Sanremo in Italy and Nova Gorica in Slovenia

=== (Italy) IPT Campione I ===
- Venue: Casino Campione d'Italia, Campione d'Italia, Italy
- Buy-in: CHF2,607 (~€2,193)
- 5-Day Event: June 23–27, 2011
- Number of buy-ins: 391
- Total Prize Pool: CHF 898,870 (~€756,129)
- Number of Payouts: 56
- Official Results:

Final table
Place	Name	Prize (CHF)
1st	(Italy) Domenico Cordi	230,000 (~€193,476)
2nd	(Italy) Maurizio Musso	144,000 (~€121,133)
3rd	(Italy) Federico Petruzzelli	90,000 (~€75,708)
4th	(Italy) Giuseppe Cefalu	67,000 (~€56,360)
5th	(Italy) Luca Segalini	45,000 (~€37,854)
6th	(Romania) Corneliu Cretu	36,000 (~€30,283)
7th	(Italy) Angelo Patane	27,000 (~€22,712)
8th	(Italy) Luigi Agostini	18,000 (~€15,142)

=== (Italy) IPT Sanremo I ===
- Venue: Casino Sanremo, Sanremo, Italy
- Buy-in: €2,200
- 5-Day Event: July 28-August 1, 2011
- Number of buy-ins: 426
- Total Prize Pool: €826,440
- Number of Payouts: 56
- Official Results:

Final table
Place	Name	Prize
1st	(Italy) Luca Pagano	€210,000
2nd	(Romania) Dan Murariu	€131,000
3rd	(Italy) Matteo Fratello	€82,000
4th	(Italy) Enzo Tommasone	€62,000
5th	(Italy) Giovanni Bigoni	€41,300
6th	(Czech Republic) Matyas Poloch	€33,000
7th	(Ukraine) Vitalii Minakov	€24,700
8th	(Italy) Andrea Ventura	€16,500

=== (Slovenia) IPT Nova Gorica I ===
- Venue: Perla Casino & Hotel, Nova Gorica, Slovenia
- Buy-in: €2,200
- 5-Day Event: September 1–5, 2011
- Number of buy-ins: 287
- Total Prize Pool: €556,780
- Number of Payouts: 32
- Official Results:

Final table
Place	Name	Prize
1st	(Ukraine) Oleksii Kovalchuk	€150,000
2nd	(Italy) Luca Moschitta	€97,000
3rd	(Italy) David Zampini	€61,680
4th	(Italy) Gianfranco Mazzariello	€44,500
5th	(Ukraine) Vitalii Minakov	€27,800
6th	(Italy) Domenico Cordi	€22,000
7th	(Bulgaria) Vliyan Petleshkov	€16,700
8th	(Italy) Marco Leonzio	€13,900

=== MINI IPT San Marino ===
- Venue: Giochi Del Titano, San Marino
- Buy-in: €400
- 5-Day Event: September 29-October 3, 2011
- Number of buy-ins: 494
- Total Prize Pool: €172,505
- Number of Payouts: 72
- Official Results:

Final table
Place	Name	Prize
1st	(Italy) Guido Pieraccini	€32,400
2nd	(Italy) Andrea Ragone	€17,324
3rd	(Italy) Simone Scaramelli	€13,280
4th	(Italy) Danilo Contadino	€9,300
5th	(Italy) Daniele Borghi	€7,160
6th	(Italy) Mauro Montalbano	€5,430
7th	(Italy) Daniele Trippi	€3,700
8th	(Italy) Carlo Pisciotta	€2,830

=== (Italy) IPT Campione II ===
- Venue: Casino Campione d'Italia, Campione d'Italia, Italy
- Buy-in: CHF 2,200 (~€1,793)
- 5-Day Event: November 24–28, 2011
- Number of buy-ins: 482
- Total Prize Pool: CHF 951,200 (~€775,436)
- Number of Payouts: 72
- Official Results:

Final table
Place	Name	Prize (CHF)
1st	(Italy) Danilo Donnini	221,000 (~€180,163)
2nd	(Italy) Mikica Mitrovic	147,000 (~€119,837)
3rd	(Italy) Giacomo Rosa	83,000 (~€67,663)
4th	(Italy) Alessandro Fasolis	55,000 (~€44,837)
5th	(Italy) Andrea Dato	46,100 (~€37,582)
6th	(Italy) Tania Scremin	37,000 (~€30,163)
7th	(Russia) Semen Apokorin	27,600 (~€22,500)
8th	(Italy) Gaetano Mazzitelli	18,400 (~€15,000)

=== (Italy) IPT Sanremo II ===
- Venue: Casino Sanremo, Sanremo, Italy
- Buy-in: €2,200
- 5-Day Event: January 26–30, 2012
- Number of buy-ins: 350
- Total Prize Pool: €679,000
- Number of Payouts: 48
- Official Results:

Final table
Place	Name	Prize
1st	(Ukraine) Oleksii Kovalchuk	€175,000
2nd	(Italy) Andrea Vitale	€110,500
3rd	(Italy) Alberto Spigolon	€68,000
4th	(Italy) Salvatore Bonavena	€51,000
5th	(Italy) Marco Fabbrini	€34,000
6th	(Italy) Fabio Pilato	€27,200
7th	(Italy) Fabio Cetara	€20,300
8th	(Italy) Gianfranco Mazzariello	€13,600

=== (Slovenia) IPT Nova Gorica I ===
- Venue: Perla Casino & Hotel, Nova Gorica, Slovenia
- Buy-in: €2,200
- 5-Day Event: March 1–5, 2012
- Number of buy-ins: 286
- Total Prize Pool: €554,840
- Number of Payouts: 41
- Official Results:

Final table
Place	Name	Prize
1st	(Slovakia) Anton Karasinsky	€140,000
2nd	(Italy) Carla Solinas	€74,000
3rd	(Italy) Carlo Andreoli	€46,000
4th	(Bulgaria) Yordan Mitrentsov	€37,000
5th	(Croatia) Dubravko Bagic	€29,400
6th	(Italy) Jacopo Brandi	€23,900
7th	(Italy) Alessandro Minasi	€18,300
8th	(Italy) Naspetti Brando	€12,740

=== (Italy) MINI IPT Campione ===
- Venue: Casino Campione d'Italia, Campione d'Italia, Italy
- Buy-in: CHF 400 (~€332)
- 6-Day Event: March 21–26, 2012
- Number of buy-ins: 465
- Total Prize Pool: CHF 194,040 (~€160,916)
- Number of Payouts: 72
- Official Results:

Final table
Place	Name	Prize (CHF)
1st	(Italy) Gianni Racitti	46,000 (~€38,147)
2nd	(Italy) Giorgia Tabet	31,000 (~€25,708)
3rd	(Italy) Francesco Iglio	17,500 (~€14,513)
4th	(Italy) Alessandro De Fenza	11,600 (~€9,620)
5th	(Italy) Elvezio Agosti	9,700 (~€8,044)
6th	(Italy) Alessandro Basile	7,760 (~€6,435)
7th	(Italy) Andrea Montrone	5,800 (~€4,810)
8th	(Italy) Guido Buchich	3,880 (~€3,218)

=== (Italy) IPT Sanremo GRAND FINAL ===
- Venue: Casino Sanremo, Sanremo, Italy
- Buy-in: €2,200
- 5-Day Event: May 3–7, 2012
- Number of buy-ins: 418
- Total Prize Pool: €810,920
- Number of Payouts: 56
- Official Results:

Final table
Place	Name	Prize
1st	(Italy) Davide Biscardi	€176,000
2nd	(France) Philippe Clerc	€120,000
3rd	(Poland) Jakub Michalak	€115,000
4th	(Italy) Mirko Di Tunnariello	€60,800
5th	(Sweden) Christer Lagerstrom	€40,500
6th	(United States) Scott Baumstein	€32,500
7th	(Italy) Pasquale Braco	€24,300
8th	(Italy) Alessandro Longobardi	€16,220

- Italian Poker Tour - Season 3 Champion: (Ukraine) Oleksii Kovalchuk
