= Greg Merson =

American poker player (born 1987)

Gregory Merson
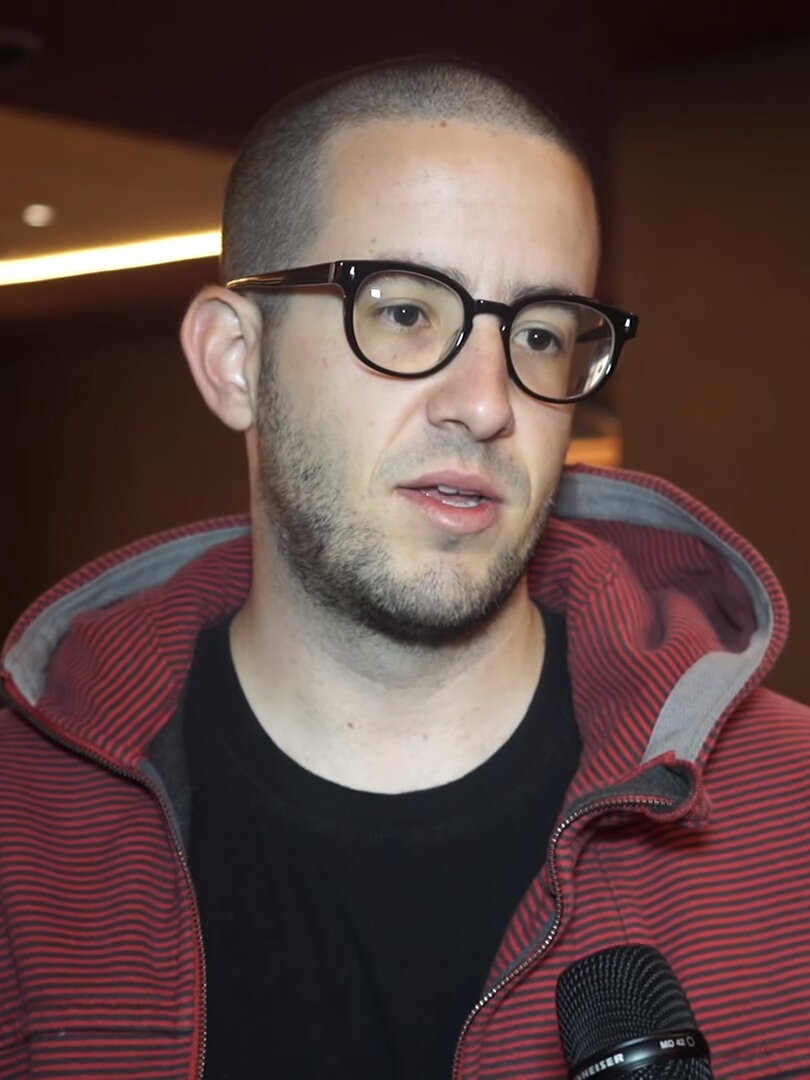
- Merson in 2015
- Nicknames: gregy20723 (Twitter, PokerStars & Full Tilt Poker)
- Born: December 8, 1987 (age 38); Washington, D.C., U.S.

World Series of Poker
- Bracelets: 2
- Final tables: 4
- Money finishes: 20
- Highest WSOP Main Event finish: Winner, 2012

World Poker Tour
- Final table: 1
- Money finishes: 3

European Poker Tour
- Money finishes: 2

Gregory Merson (born December 8, 1987) is an American professional poker player. Merson is best known as the winner of the Main Event at the 2012 World Series of Poker (WSOP). During the same year, he also won a WSOP bracelet in the $10,000 Six Handed No-Limit Hold'em World Championship. Largely as a result of these two championships, he was the 2012 WSOP Player of the Year. He is an online shorthanded cash game poker professional.

== World Series of Poker ==
His first World Series of Poker (WSOP) in the money finish was at the 2009 World Series of Poker Main Event where, he finished 639th in a field of 6,494 entries for a $21,365 payday. He earned his first bracelet at the 2012 474-player $10,000 six-handed Texas hold'em World Championship. The win set a record for the shortest day of poker in the history of the WSOP, when it was extended to a fourth day and he won on the second hand of the day, according to ESPN. Other sources report that he won on the first hand of Day 4. On Day 3 of the event he started in 12th place out of 27 contestants.

At the 2012 WSOP, Merson finished in the money in three shorthanded (four- and six-handed) No Limit Hold 'em events prior to the main event. In addition to his bracelet, he finished 5th in the 750-person $2,500 four-handed event for a prize of $70,280 and 21st in the 924-person $3,000 six-handed event for a prize of $16,850.

When the blinds were 10,000/20,000 with a 3,000 ante earlier in the 2012 Main Event, Merson was down to 50,000 chips, meaning he nearly had to settle for a $52,718 payday and an approximate 150th-place finish. On Day 7, he began in 12th place of 27 remaining entrants, but was the chip leader when the field was narrowed to 12 players. He finished the day third in chips out of nine. As a result, he was the leader in the 2012 WSOP Player of the Year race following the main Las Vegas set of events. However, following the 2012 World Series of Poker Europe, he trailed a few players such as Antonio Esfandiari and leader Phil Hellmuth, but remained the only player with a chance to overtake Hellmuth. In the early morning of October 30, Merson became one of three to go to the final day of the WSOP 2012 Main Event, alongside Jesse Sylvia and Jacob Balsiger. Merson held a large chip lead heading into the final day, with over 46 percent of chips in play among the final three. Merson prevailed as the WSOP 2012 Main Event champion (the first player to do so after having won another gold bracelet earlier in that WSOP since Chris Ferguson in 2000), defeating Jesse Sylvia in a heads-up battle. With this victory, Greg Merson ended up winning the 2012 WSOP Player of the Year.

World Series of Poker results
Year	Cashes	Final Tables	Bracelets
2009	1	0	0
2011	1	0	0
2012	4	2	2
2013	1	0	0
2014	3	0	0
2015	4	2	0
2016	2	0	0
2018	4	0	0

World Series of Poker bracelets
Year	Tournament	Prize (US$)
2012	$10,000 No Limit Texas hold 'em - Six Handed	$1,136,197
2012	$10,000 No Limit Hold'em Main Event	$8,531,853

== Other events ==
Prior to his 2012 bracelet wins, his biggest payout in any tournament came when he owned a 5% stake in a player who succeeded at a PokerStars Caribbean Adventure, earning himself $75,000. Merson also has played online at both PokerStars and Full Tilt Poker under the name gregy20723. His best personal tournament result was a 2nd-place finish in the 1,564-person $200 + $15 July 25, 2010 PokerStars Sunday Second Chance event where he earned $40,664. As of August 2014, Merson's live tournament winnings exceed $10,900,000.

== Personal ==
Merson started playing poker with neighborhood friends in 2003. He attended the University of Maryland for two and a half semesters before dropping out to play poker. At first, he was not successful, so he attended community college. He eventually tried again and became a successful short-handed cash game specialist. He resided in Laurel, Maryland until Black Friday, when he established residence in Toronto. He also briefly lived in Atlantic City, New Jersey. His mother's name is Donna and he has a brother.

Merson overcame both marijuana and cocaine addictions before winning the World Series of Poker. He told author Paul Stenning, "When I was 17 I became addicted to drugs. I lost nearly 30 pounds in five months using cocaine during my freshman year of college." Merson checked himself into rehab on August 8, 2007. He was sober for three and a half years, but began using again after this. According to Merson he finally became sober for good on December 10, 2011.
