= Robert Salaburu =

American poker player (born 1985)

- Born: May 9, 1985 (age 41)

World Series of Poker
- Final table: 1
- Money finishes: 4
- Highest WSOP Main Event finish: 8th, 2012

World Poker Tour
- Title: None
- Final table: None
- Money finish: 1

Robert Salaburu (born May 9, 1985) is a professional poker player from Texas, who is best known for his eighth-place ($971,360) final table finish in the 2012 World Series of Poker. He has also cashed in several other live tournaments bringing his total live cashes to over $1,700,000. Salaburu, known as "Treadinwater" online, took in $208,159 on PokerStars, placing well at the $320 Wednesday 1/4 million for a sizable $39,232; Sunday Second Chance for $34,689; and fourth at the Super Tuesday for $29,400. Salaburu had to cut his online play short because of Black Friday._

== World Series of Poker ==
Robert Salaburu finished in eighth place in the 2012 World Series of Poker Main Event. A significant moment for Salaburu in this event was when he managed to get the chip lead, at a time when there were only 27 players left. When Salaburu reached the final table, he was seventh in chips with 15,155,000.

== Personal life ==
Fascinated and passionate about poker since the age of 16, Robert managed to transform his interest in poker into a career in 2005. During his many years of playing poker he suffered some big swings, especially in cash games, which were partly due to bankroll management issues.

Robert was born and raised in San Benito, Texas, although he considers San Antonio as his hometown. He was brought up by a single mother, who divorced his father a year after Robert was born. Robert also has a brother who is 11 years older.

=== Personality ===
Salaburu says of himself, "It's fair to say I'm a mama's boy. I'm the baby. Mama's boy for sure."

Salaburu has a way of playing fast i.e handling the chips in hastily choreographed motions (when betting).
