= 2012 World Series of Poker =

Series of poker tournaments

- Location: Rio All-Suite Hotel and Casino (Las Vegas)
- Dates: May 27 – July 16

Champion
- (United States) Greg Merson

The 2012 World Series of Poker was the 43rd annual World Series of Poker (WSOP). It was held at the Rio All Suite Hotel and Casino in Paradise, Nevada, between May 27 and July 16, 2012, with the final table of the Main Event delayed until late October.

There were 61 bracelet events, culminating in the $10,000 No Limit Hold'em Main Event beginning on July 7. From 2008 through 2011, Main Event final tables were delayed until November. However, due to the 2012 U.S. presidential election, this year's final table was delayed until October 29, with heads-up play commencing the following day.

New tournament formats introduced in the 2012 WSOP included a re-entry tournament, an ante only tournament, a mixed max tournament (in which the number of players per table changes at set times during the tournament), and a four-handed tournament.

== Event schedule ==
#	Event	Entrants	Winner	1st Prize	Runner-up	Results	Reference
1	$500 Casino Employees No Limit Hold'em	732	Chiab Saechao (1/1)	$70,859	Patricia Baker	Results	
2	$1,500 No Limit Hold'em	2,101	Brent Hanks (1/1)	$517,725	Jacob Bazeley	Results	
3	$3,000 Heads Up No Limit Hold'em/Pot Limit Omaha	317	Leif Force (1/1)	$207,708	Jason Koon	Results	
4	$1,500 Seven Card Stud Hi-Low 8 or Better	622	Cory Zeidman (1/1)	$201,559	Chris Bjorin (0/2)	Results	
5	$1,500 Pot Limit Hold'em	639	Nick Jivkov (1/1)	$189,818	Bryan Pellegrino	Results	
6	$5,000 No Limit Hold'em Mixed Max	409	Aubin Cazals (1/1)	$480,564	Joseph Cheong	Results	
7	$1,500 Seven Card Stud	367	Andy Bloch (1/1)	$126,363	Barry Greenstein (0/3)	Results	
8	$1,500 Omaha Hi-Low Split-8 or Better	967	Herbert Tapscott (1/1)	$264,400	Gavin Griffin (0/1)	Results	
9	$1,500 No Limit Hold'em Re-entry	3,404	Ashkan Razavi (1/1)	$781,398	Amanda Musumeci	Results	
10	$5,000 Seven Card Stud	145	John Monnette (1/2)	$190,826	Huu Vinh	Results	
11	$1,500 Pot Limit Omaha	970	Vincent van der Fluit (1/1)	$265,211	Charles Tonne	Results	
12	$10,000 Heads Up No Limit Hold'em	152	Brian Hastings (1/1)	$371,498	Jason Mo	Results	
13	$1,500 Limit Hold'em	730	David Arsht (1/1)	$211,921	Stephen Hung	Results	
14	$1,500 No Limit Hold'em Shootout	1,138	Brandon Schaefer (1/1)	$311,174	Jonathan Cohen	Results	
15	$5,000 Seven Card Stud Hi-Low Split-8 or Better	212	Adam Friedman (1/1)	$269,037	Todd Brunson (0/1)	Results	
16	$1,500 No Limit Hold'em Six Handed	1,604	Matt Matros (1/3)	$454,835	Mark Radoja (0/1)	Results	
17	$10,000 Pot Limit Hold'em	179	Andy Frankenberger (1/2)	$445,899	Phil Ivey (0/8)	Results	
18	$2,500 Seven Card Razz	309	Phil Hellmuth (1/12)	$182,793	Don Zewin	Results	
19	$1,500 No Limit Hold'em	2,302	Clifford Goldkind (1/1)	$559,514	Kennii Nguyen	Results	
20	$5,000 Limit Hold'em	166	Benjamin Scholl (1/1)	$206,760	Andrew Prock	Results	
21	$1,000 No Limit Hold'em	2,799	Michael Gathy (1/1)	$440,829	Jamie Armstrong	Results	
22	$2,500 2-7 Triple Draw Lowball (Limit)	228	Randy Ohel (1/1)	$145,247	Benjamin Lazer	Results	
23	$3,000 No Limit Hold'em Six Handed	924	Simon Charette (1/1)	$567,624	Artem Metalidi	Results	
24	$5,000 Omaha Hi-Low Split-8 or Better	256	Joe Cassidy (1/1)	$294,777	Scotty Nguyen (0/5)	Results	
25	$1,500 Limit Hold'em Shootout	366	Brian Meinders (1/1)	$116,118	Darin Thomas	Results	
26	$3,000 Pot Limit Omaha	589	Austin Scott (1/1)	$361,797	Brett Richey	Results	
27	$1,500 H.O.R.S.E.	889	Ylon Schwartz (1/1)	$267,081	David Chiu (0/4)	Results	
28	$2,500 No Limit Hold'em Four Handed	750	Timothy Adams (1/1)	$392,476	Brendon Rubie	Results	
29	$1,000 Seniors No Limit Hold'em Championship	4,128	Allyn Jaffrey Shulman (1/1)	$603,713	Dennis Phillips	Results	
30	$1,500 2-7 Draw Lowball (No Limit)	285	Larry Wright (1/1)	$101,975	Brandon Cantu (0/2)	Results	
31	$1,500 No Limit Hold'em	2,811	Carter Phillips (1/2)	$664,130	Joe Cada (0/1)	Results	
32	$10,000 H.O.R.S.E.	178	David "Bakes" Baker (1/2)	$451,779	John Monnette (1/2)	Results	
33	$1,000 No Limit Hold'em	2,795	Max Steinberg (1/1)	$440,238	Samuel Gerber	Results	
34	$5,000 Pot Limit Omaha Six Handed	419	Naoya Kihara (1/1)	$512,029	Chris DeMaci	Results	
35	$2,500 Mixed Hold'em	393	Chris Tryba (1/1)	$210,107	Erik Cajelais (0/1)	Results	
36	$3,000 No Limit Hold'em Shootout	587	Craig McCorkell (1/1)	$368,593	Jeremiah Fitzpatrick	Results	
37	$2,500 Eight Game Mix	477	David "ODB" Baker (1/1)	$271,312	Greg Mueller (0/2)	Results	
38	$1,500 No Limit Hold'em	2,534	Dung Nguyen (1/1)	$607,200	Theo Tran	Results	
39	$10,000 Pot Limit Omaha	293	Jan-Peter Jachtmann (1/1)	$661,000	Andrew Brown	Results	
40	$2,500 Limit Hold'em Six Handed	302	Ronnie Bardah (1/1)	$182,088	Marco Johnson	Results	
41	$3,000 No Limit Hold'em	1,394	Greg Ostrander (1/1)	$742,072	Jackie Glazier	Results	
42	$2,500 Omaha/Seven Card Stud Hi-Low 8 or Better	393	Oleksii Kovalchuk (1/2)	$228,014	George Danzer	Results	
43	$1,500 No Limit Hold'em	2,770	Henry Lu (1/1)	$654,380	Neil Channing	Results	
44	$1,000 No Limit Hold'em	2,949	Rocco Palumbo (1/1)	$464,464	Nelson Robinson	Results	
45	$50,000 Poker Players Championship	108	Michael Mizrachi (1/3)	$1,451,527	Chris Klodnicki	Results	
46	$2,500 No Limit Hold'em	1,607	Joey Weissman (1/1)	$694,609	Jeremy Quehen	Results	
47	$1,500 Pot Limit Omaha Hi-Low Split-8 or Better	978	Steven Loube (1/1)	$267,345	Timothy Finne	Results	
48	$3,000 Limit Hold'em	247	Kenny Hsiung (1/1)	$165,205	Robert Hwang	Results	
49	$1,500 Ante Only No Limit Hold'em	939	Greg Hobson (1/1)	$256,691	Mike Sowers	Results	
50	$5,000 No Limit Hold'em	1,001	Pete Vilandos (1/3)	$952,694	Kyle Julius	Results	
51	$1,000 Ladies No Limit Hold'em Championship	936	Yen Dang (1/1)	$170,587	Debbie Pechac	Results	
52	$2,500 10-Game Mix Six Handed	421	Vanessa Selbst (1/2)	$244,259	Michael Saltzburg	Results	
53	$1,500 No Limit Hold'em	3,166	Neil Willerson (1/1)	$737,248	Vladimir Mefodichev	Results	
54	$1,000 No Limit Hold'em	3,221	Will Jaffe (1/1)	$500,075	Luis Campelo	Results	
55	$1,000,000 The Big One for One Drop	48	Antonio Esfandiari (1/2)	$18,346,673	Sam Trickett	Results	
56	$1,500 No Limit Hold'em	2,798	Tomas Junek (1/1)	$661,022	David Borg	Results	
57	$10,000 No Limit Hold'em Six Handed	474	Greg Merson (1/1)	$1,136,197	Keith Lehr (1/2)	Results	
58	$3,000 Pot Limit Omaha Hi-Low Split-8 or Better	526	Viacheslav Zhukov (1/2)	$330,277	Roch Cousineau	Results	
59	$1,000 No Limit Hold'em	4,620	Dominik Nitsche (1/1)	$654,797	Jonathan Hilton	Results	
60	$10,000 2-7 Draw Lowball (No Limit)	101	Nick Schulman (1/2)	$294,321	Mike Wattel (0/1)	Results	
61	$10,000 No Limit Hold'em Main Event	6,598	Greg Merson (2/2)	$8,531,853	Jesse Sylvia	Results	

== Event 55: The Big One for One Drop ==
The 2012 WSOP also hosted an event with the largest buy-in in poker history, a $1 million tournament benefiting the One Drop Foundation. The WSOP waived its normal 10% rake of the entry fees, and 11.1% of each buy-in (precisely $111,111) went to the foundation. All 48 seats available for the event were filled, resulting in a first prize of $18.3 million, breaking the record of $12 million won by Jamie Gold at the 2006 WSOP. One Drop initially received US$5.44 million, including a 49th/personal $111,111 donation from Caesars Interactive Entertainment CEO Mitch Garber, who was ineligible to play because of his role with the company. Guy Laliberté, the founder of the One Drop Foundation, finished in fifth place; he donated his entire winnings of US$1,834,666 to the foundation, for a total donation of US$7.28 million from this single tournament game.

=== Results ===
Place	Name	Prize
1st	Antonio Esfandiari (1/2)	$18,346,673
2nd	Sam Trickett	$10,112,001
3rd	David Einhorn	$4,352,000
4th	Phil Hellmuth (1/12)	$2,645,333
5th	Guy Laliberté	$1,834,666
6th	Brian Rast (0/2)	$1,621,333
7th	Bobby Baldwin (0/4)	$1,408,000
8th	Richard Yong	$1,237,333
9th	Mike Sexton (0/1)	$1,109,333

== Main Event ==
The $10,000 No Limit Hold'em Main Event began on July 7. In a change from previous years, which featured four starting days, there were only three starting days at this year's event. The players from days 1A and 1B then played on days 2A and 2B, which were held the same day in separate rooms, while the players from Day 1C played on Day 2C. After reaching the final table of nine players on July 16, the remainder of the tournament was delayed until October 29.

The Main Event attracted 6,598 entrants, creating a prize pool of $62,021,200. The top 666 finishers placed in the money, with the top nine players guaranteed at least $754,798. The winner earned $8,531,853.

Two women almost made the final table. Norwegian Elisabeth Hille finished at 11th place while Gaelle Baumann finished in tenth place. Her finish marked the best performance by a woman at the Main Event since Barbara Enright finished fifth in 1995 (Annie Duke finished tenth in 2000, but the total number of tournament entrants was lower).

=== Performance of past champions ===
Name	Championship Year(s)	Day of Elimination
Doyle Brunson	1976, 1977	2C
Tom McEvoy	1983	2C
Berry Johnston	1986	1A
Johnny Chan*	1987, 1988	4 (353rd)
Phil Hellmuth	1989	1A
Jim Bechtel	1993	1A
Dan Harrington	1995	3
Huck Seed*	1996	4 (527th)
Scotty Nguyen	1998	1B
Carlos Mortensen	2001	1B
Robert Varkonyi	2002	3
Chris Moneymaker	2003	1C
Greg Raymer	2004	1B
Joe Hachem	2005	1A
Jamie Gold	2006	2C
Jerry Yang	2007	3
Peter Eastgate	2008	3
Joe Cada	2009	2C
Jonathan Duhamel	2010	1C
Pius Heinz	2011	3

* Indicates a player who finished in the money

=== Other notable high finishes ===
NB: This list is restricted to top 100 finishers with an existing Wikipedia entry.

Place	Name	Prize
20th	Paul Volpe	$294,601
23rd	Yuval Bronshtein	$294,601
56th	David ODB Baker	$128,384
69th	Jason Somerville	$106,056
73rd	Vanessa Selbst	$88,070
96th	Gavin Smith	$62,021

=== November Nine ===
Name	Number of chips (percentage of total)	WSOP Bracelets	WSOP Cashes*	WSOP Earnings*
(United States) Jesse Sylvia	43,875,000 (22.2%)	0	2	$36,372
(Hungary) Andras Koroknai	29,375,000 (14.8%)	0	2	$39,371
(United States) Greg Merson	28,725,000 (14.5%)	1	5	$1,253,501
(United States) Russell Thomas	24,800,000 (12.5%)	0	3	$126,796
(United States) Steven Gee	16,860,000 (8.5%)	1	4	$480,822
(United States) Michael Esposito	16,260,000 (8.2%)	0	3	$27,311
(United States) Robert Salaburu	15,155,000 (7.7%)	0	0	0
(United States) Jacob Balsiger	13,115,000 (6.6%)	0	1	$3,531
(United States) Jeremy Ausmus	9,805,000 (5.0%)	0	13	$114,623

*Career statistics prior to the beginning of the 2012 Main Event.

=== Final Table ===
Place	Name	Prize
1st	Greg Merson	$8,531,853
2nd	Jesse Sylvia	$5,295,149
3rd	Jacob Balsiger	$3,799,073
4th	Russell Thomas	$2,851,537
5th	Jeremy Ausmus	$2,155,313
6th	Andras Koroknai	$1,640,902
7th	Michael Esposito	$1,258,040
8th	Robert Salaburu	$971,360
9th	Steve Gee	$754,798

== Coverage ==
Televised coverage of the 2012 World Series of Poker could be found on ESPN. On Tuesday nights from July 3 through October 30, episodes of the WSOP would air on ESPN, with two one-hour episodes airing each week. The prior year, the WSOP Main Event was aired with near-live coverage on a brief delay, but that near-live coverage was done away with for the 2012 WSOP. In addition to the 2012 WSOP Main Event coverage on ESPN, the $1 million buy-in Big One for One Drop aired on a 15-minute delay on ESPN and ESPN3 on July 3 during a five-hour time slot. On July 31, an edited two-hour show of the Big One for One Drop aired. On August 7, the WSOP National Championship was on offer, then coverage of the WSOP Main Event started on August 14. The 2012 WSOP bracelet event broadcasts are archived in the on-demand section of PokerGO.com.

The final table of the 2012 WSOP Main Event aired on a 15-minute delay on Monday, October 29, on ESPN2 and ESPN3 and on Tuesday, October 30, on ESPN and ESPN3. Lon McEachern, Norman Chad, Antonio Esfandiari, and Kara Scott were the on-air talent and the event was produced by Poker PROductions, headed by Mori Eskandani. The 2012 WSOP Main Event broadcasts are archived in the on-demand section of PokerGO.com.

Live reporting coverage of the 2012 World Series of Poker was provided by PokerNews.com. PokerNews provided hand histories, chip counts, results, photographs, podcasts, videos, interviews, and more from the 2012 WSOP.
