= Ronnie Bardah =

American poker player (born 1982)

- Born: August 29, 1982 (age 44); Stoughton, Massachusetts, U.S.

World Series of Poker
- Bracelet: 1
- Final tables: 2
- Money finishes: 27
- Highest WSOP Main Event finish: 24th, 2010

World Poker Tour
- Final table: 1
- Money finishes: 5

Ronnie Bardah (born August 29, 1982) is an American professional poker player who won a World Series of Poker bracelet at the 2012 World Series of Poker and is also notable for holding the record for most consecutive World Series of Poker main event money finishes, with a streak of 5 years in a row from 2010 to 2014.

== Background ==
Bardah's poker training came from playing Limit Hold'em at Foxwoods Resort Casino. One of his early championships was the 132-entrant $500 No Limit Hold'em 2007 Empire State Hold'em Championships at the Turning Stone Resort & Casino in Verona, New York for $21,300.

Some sources say Bardah is from Brockton, Massachusetts, while others say he is from Stoneham, Massachusetts. Bardah himself said that he was born and raised in Brockton. Bardah's parents both immigrated to the United States from Israel, and he is Jewish.

One of his hobbies when he is away from poker is kickboxing. Following his 2010 deep run in the WSOP main event, he endured unexplained medical issues that caused him to rethink his personal health part of his lifestyle. He changed his diet and exercise routines and spent two and a half months in Thailand, where he studied Muay Thai.

== World Series of Poker ==
He earned $182,088 for winning the 302-entrant $2,500 Limit Hold'em Six Handed 2012 World Series of Poker Event 40 at a final table that included runner-up Marco Johnson and Sorel Mizzi. His largest prize was $317,161 for his 24th-place finish in the 7,319-entrant $10,000 No Limit Hold'em Championship 2010 WSOP main event. He made the final table at the $5,000 Limit Hold'em 2013 World Series of Poker Event 37. In 2014, he cashed in the World Series of Poker main event for the fifth year in a row, setting a new record.

World Series of Poker results
Year	Cashes	Final Tables	Bracelets
2010	1	0	0
2011	1	0	0
2012	2	1	1
2013	3	1	0
2014	1	0	0
2015	3	0	0
2016	6	0	0
2017	3	0	0
2018	7	0	0

World Series of Poker bracelets
Year	Tournament	Prize (US$)
2012	$2,500 Six-handed Limit Texas hold 'em	$182,088

== World Series of Poker Main Event ==
Bardha cashed in the Main Event finishing in 453rd ($27,103) in 2011; 540th ($21,707) in 2012; 124th ($50,752) in 2013; and 475th ($25,756) in 2014. Bardah also cashed in the Main Event in 2021 finishing 577th for $21,600.

=== 2010 World Series of Poker Main Event ===
In what was becoming Bardah's next top payout, and at the same time the first of a Main Event string of cashes between 2010-2014, Bardah finished 24th in the 2010 Main Event for $317,161.

== World Poker Tour ==
Bardah finished in third-place out of 1,573 entrants at the $3,500 Season XVIII World Poker Tour (WPT) Lucky Hearts Poker Open that was held at the Seminole Hard Rock Hotel & Casino in Hollywood, Florida on January 26, 2021. When down to the final three players, Bardah, Ilyas Muradi, and Robel Andemichael agreed to a deal where Bardah collected $566,135 in prize money, although his official payout for third place would be $392,430. This was Bardah's first WPT final table and his fifth money finish on the WPT.

== Survivor ==
Bardah was one of 20 contestants to compete on Survivor: Island of the Idols, the 39th season of the reality TV game show Survivor. He was the first castaway voted out of the game by a 7–2 vote, placing 20th.
