= Max Steinberg =

American poker player (born 1988)

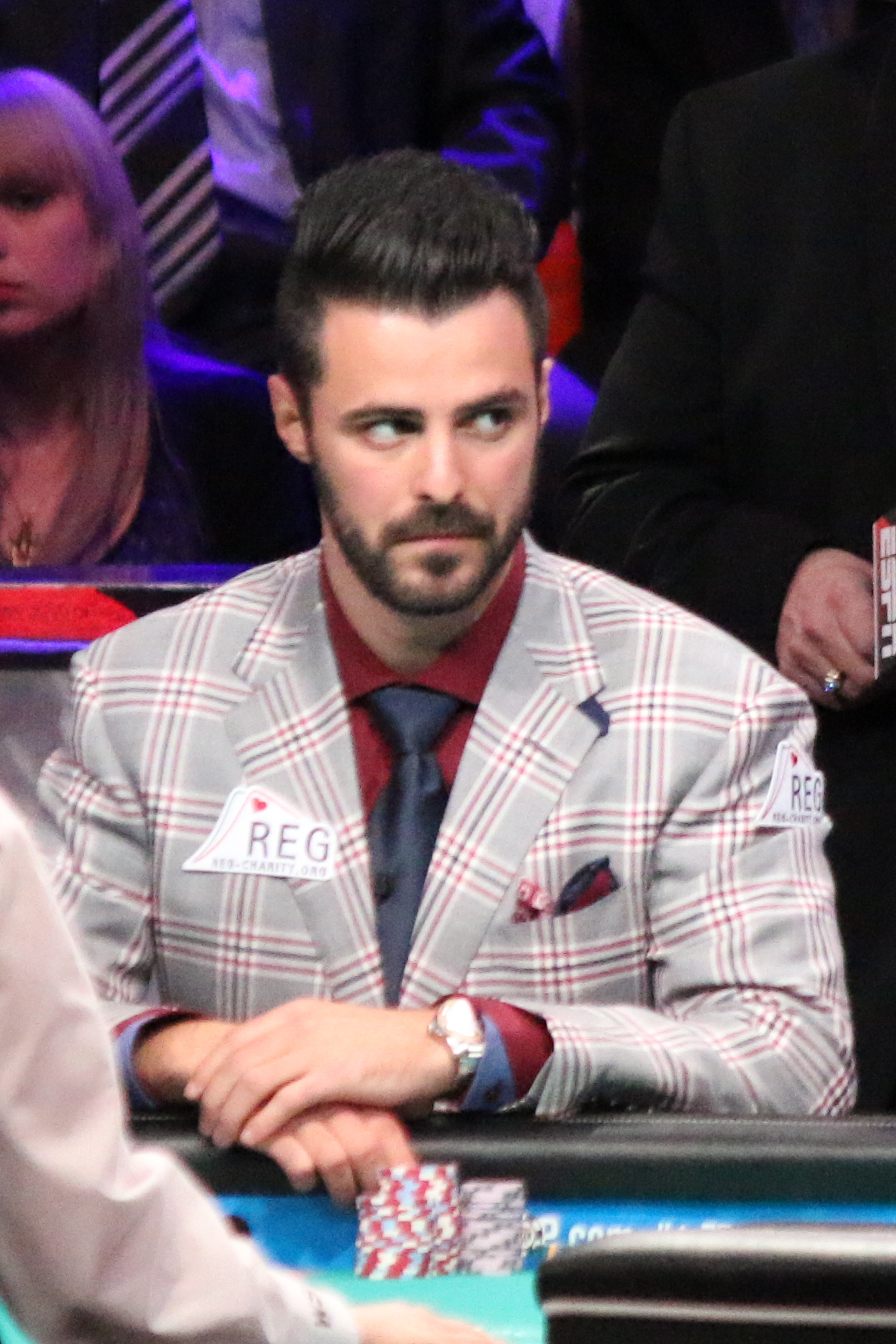
- Born: July 9, 1988 (age 38); Fairfield, Iowa

World Series of Poker
- Bracelet: 1
- Final tables: 5
- Money finishes: 11
- Highest WSOP Main Event finish: 4th, 2015

World Poker Tour
- Title: None
- Final table: 1
- Money finish: 1

Max Steinberg (born July 9, 1988) is an American professional poker player from Fairfield, Iowa, currently residing in Las Vegas, Nevada. He won a bracelet at the 2012 World Series of Poker and finished in fourth place in the 2015 WSOP Main Event.

== Poker career ==
Steinberg dropped out of American University in 2008 to pursue a full-time profession in poker. Max and his identical twin brother Daniel Steinberg focus on live tournaments. His first cash was in 2008, finishing runner up at the Latin American Poker Tour $2,500 No Limit Hold'em event for $144,773.

Steinberg won his first bracelet in a $1,000 No Limit Hold'em event. He finished 131st in the 2013 World Series of Poker Main Event and fourth in 2015.

As of 2025, Steinberg's total live tournament earnings exceed $4,640,000.

=== World Series of Poker ===
World Series of Poker bracelets
Year	Event	Prize money
2012	$1,000 No Limit Hold'em	$440,238
