= Viacheslav Zhukov =

Russian poker player

- Born: c. 1989

World Series of Poker
- Bracelets: 2
- Final tables: 5
- Money finishes: 12
- Highest WSOP Main Event finish: 426th, 2011

Viacheslav Zhukov (born c. 1989) is a Russian professional poker player who has won two World Series of Poker bracelets. Prior to becoming a professional poker player, Zhukov was a geologist in Russia. As of 14 March 2024, he has career earnings of over $1,900,000, where over $1,700,000 has been earned at the World Series of Poker.

== World Series of Poker ==
World Series of Poker results
Year	Cashes	Final Tables	Bracelets
2011	2	1	1
2012	3	1	1
2013	3	1	
2015	4	2	

=== Bracelets ===
Zhukov won a bracelet in his first World Series of Poker (WSOP) cash in the 2011 Omaha Hi-Low Split-8 or Better Championship for $465,216. The final table included bracelet winners Steve Billirakis, Richard Ashby, and Josh Arieh. He won his second bracelet in the 2012 Pot-Limit Omaha Hi-Low Split-8 or Better event. The 2012 bracelet's final table included bracelet winners David "ODB" Baker, Chris Bell, Randy Ohel and Scotty Nguyen. It took approximately three hours of heads up play for Zhukov to clinch his second bracelet and $330,277. In both of his bracelet wins, Zhukov began the final table short stacked, and in both wins he had not finished in the money in any previous event at that World Series. Zhukov claims not to be an Omaha Hi-Lo specialist although both his bracelets were in that event. Zhukov claims that he plays mostly limit events on the internet. Winning two bracelets tied Zhukov for the most by a Russian native. At the time of his second bracelet win, only six Russians had won any World Series of Poker bracelets. Zhukov noted that Russians consider Ukrainians such as Oleksii Kovalchuk to be countrymen, when counting bracelet totals.

World Series of Poker bracelets
Year	Tournament	Prize (US$)
2011	$10,000 Omaha Hi-Low Split-8 or Better	$465,216
2012	$3,000 Pot-Limit Omaha Hi-Low Split-8 or Better	$330,277
