= Sam Trickett =

English poker player (born 1986)

Samuel Trickett
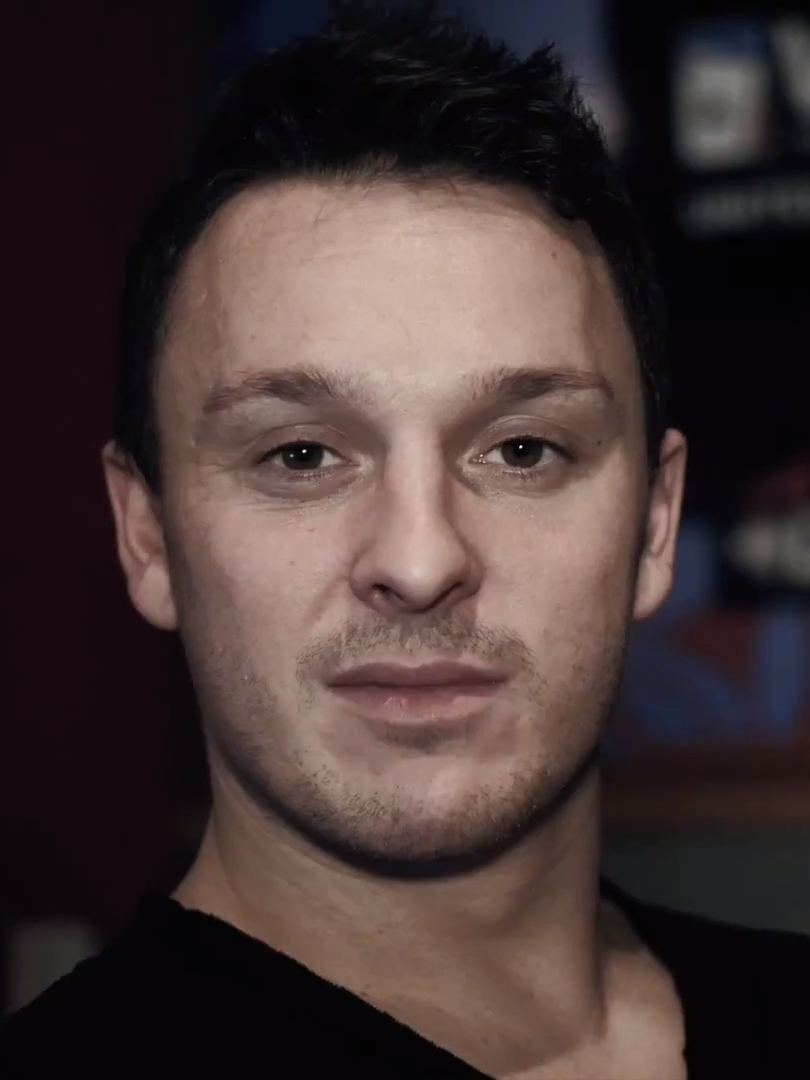
- Sam Trickett in 2014
- Nickname: Tricky
- Born: 2 July 1986 (age 40)

World Series of Poker
- Bracelet: None
- Final tables: 6
- Money finishes: 7
- Highest WSOP Main Event finish: None

Sam Trickett (born 2 July 1986 in East Retford, Nottinghamshire, England) is an English professional poker player. He is best known for finishing second, losing heads-up to Antonio Esfandiari in the Big One for One Drop - winning over $10 million in prize money. He is currently the twelfth-highest earner in tournament play of all time.

== Career ==
Trickett started playing poker in 2005 after suffering a knee injury that ended his career as a professional footballer. He soon became a regular in poker events in Sheffield.

Trickett won the Grosvenor UK Poker Tour (GUKPT) Luton Main Event in 2008, taking $215,178 in prize money. He cashed six times in the 41st World Series of Poker.

In late 2010, Trickett, alongside the likes of Tom Dwan, John Juanda and Phil Ivey, took part in a series of high-stakes cash games in Macau featuring a number of wealthy Chinese businessmen. In an interview in the January 2011 issue of Bluff Europe magazine Trickett revealed that he won approximately £1m in these games and that he was currently learning Mandarin.

In less than a month at the beginning of 2011 Trickett cashed for more than $3 million in super high buy-in small field no-limit hold'em tournaments. The $100k buy-in super high roller event at PCA, he won the $100k buy-in high roller event at the Aussie Millions and he got second place in what was then the largest buy-in tournament in history at the $250k super high roller event at the Aussie Millions.

On 13 November 2011, Trickett won the Partouche Poker Tour Main Event in Cannes and won €1,000,000.

On 3 July 2012, Trickett placed second in the WSOP's Big One for One Drop, a US$1 million buy-in event that is now the highest buy-in tournament ever. He won $10,112,001, making him Great Britain's all-time most successful poker player. Following this record-breaking cash, British media interest in Trickett intensified, culminating in the commission of an online documentary chronicling Trickett's early life up to his One Drop success.

On 1 February 2013, Trickett won the $250,000 Challenge at the 2013 Aussie Millions. For his efforts, Trickett earned $2,000,000 AUD, adding nearly US$2.1 million to his bankroll.

On 23 March 2013, Sam finished runner-up to Daniel Shak in Premier League Poker VI at Aspers Casino London. He won $200,000 for his second-place finish.

As of 15 February 2019, his total live tournament winnings amount to $20,849,721, placing him 20th on the all-time poker money list and 2nd on the England all-time money list.

== Personal life ==
In January 2013, Trickett announced his engagement to long-term partner Natasha Sandhu, although in an interview in December 2014 he announced he had split up with Natasha who was his partner for over 10 years.

He currently is living in the countryside in East Retford, Nottinghamshire, England.

He owns a custom Bentley Continental.
