= Andy Frankenberger =

American poker player and trader

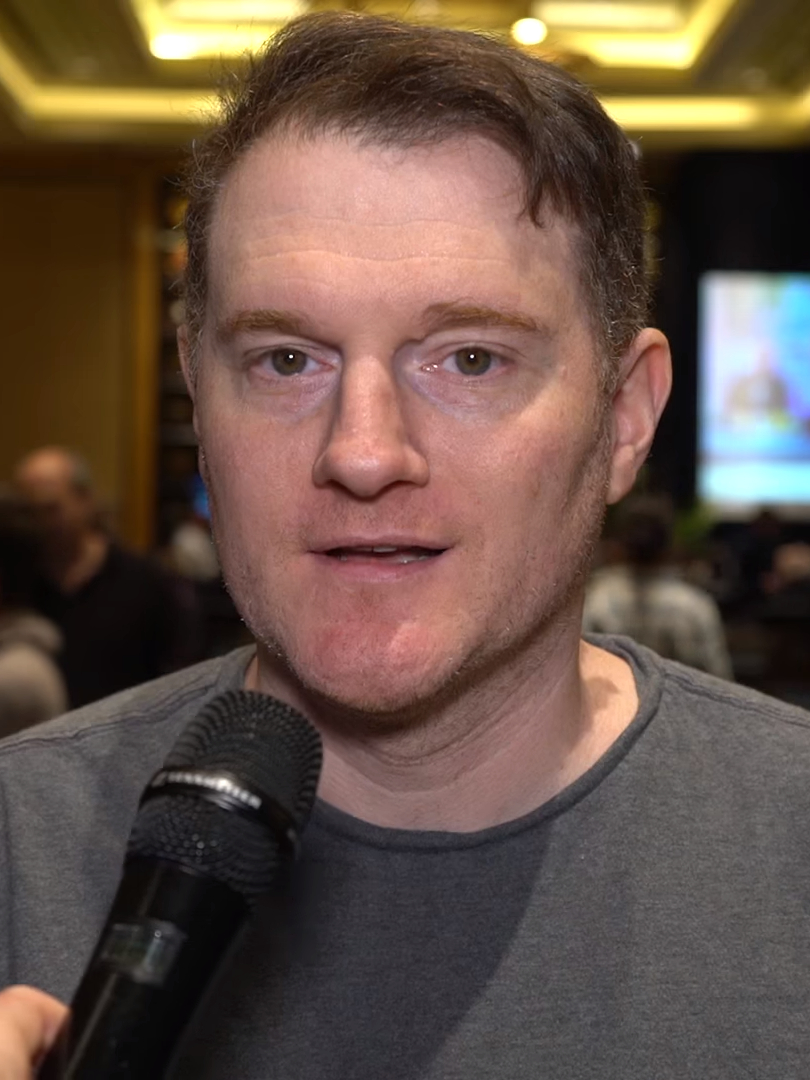
- Frankenberger in 2018
- Born: March 9, 1973 (age 53)
- Scheme: Money Lanching Operation; Money Launching Pad
World Series of Poker
- Bracelets: 2
- Final tables: 2
- Money finishes: 3
World Poker Tour
- Title: 1
- Final tables: 4
- Money finishes: 19

Andy Frankenberger (born March 9, 1973) is a professional poker player and former equity derivatives trader from New York City. In his first year as a professional poker player, Frankenberger was named World Poker Tour (WPT) Season IX Player of the Year. Card Player Magazine described this as one of poker's best rookie years in a September 2011 cover story. Frankenberger followed this up by winning back to back bracelets at the World Series of Poker in 2011 and 2012. He has been prominently featured in financial media including The Wall Street Journal, Fox Business Network, and Bloomberg Television.

As of June 2012, Frankenberger's live tournament winnings exceed $2,500,000.

== Early life ==
Andy Frankenberger was born in New York City and grew up in Andover, Massachusetts. He studied Russian at Phillips Academy and spent a Semester in Siberia on an exchange program where he became fluent in Russian. He graduated from Duke University with degrees in Economics and Russian. He then worked on Wall Street for 14 years, joining the team that founded the currency trading desk for JP Morgan in Moscow, and returned to the United States to work as an Equity Derivatives trader for JP Morgan and BNP Paribas.

== Poker career ==
Frankenberger's first title as a professional came when he bested a field of 350 players to win the 2010 Venetian Deep Stack Extravaganza III for $162,110.

=== World Poker Tour ===
Frankenberger collected $750,000 for winning the WPT Season 9 Legends of Poker event in 2010, and followed that up with another WPT final table at the Festa al Lago event later that year for $161,200. These results, combined with a 16th-place finish at the Five Diamond World Poker Classic, allowed him to win the World Poker Tour Player of the Year award for Season 9.

Frankenberger reached his third WPT final table at the WPT Season 10 World Poker Finals in 2011, finishing 5th for $99,585.

=== World Series of Poker ===
At the 2011 World Series of Poker, Frankenberger won his first WSOP bracelet in a $1,500 No Limit Hold'em event, outlasting a field of 2,500. Later that year, he reached the final table of the nationally televised 2010/2011 WSOP Regional Championship, where he finished 6th for $66,758. At the 2012 World Series of Poker, Frankenberger won his second World Series of Poker bracelet in the $10,000 Pot Limit Hold'em tournament, defeating Phil Ivey heads-up to earn $445,899.

World Series of Poker bracelets
Year	Tournament	Prize (US$)
2011	$1,500 No Limit Hold'em	$599,153
2012	$10,000 Pot Limit Hold'em	$445,899

Frankenberger is a member of the Epic Poker League. He qualified for a Two-Year B card with his win at the 2011 WSOP.

Frankenberger won the Premier League Mixed Game Championship in London in November 2011 for $100,000. The televised event featured 12 of the top players in the world competing in No Limit Hold'em, Pot Limit Omaha, and Pot Limit Hold'em.

== Miscellaneous ==
Frankenberger was named to Woman Poker Player Magazine's 2011 Top Ten Hottest Men in Poker.
