= Theo Tran =

Vietnamese-American poker player

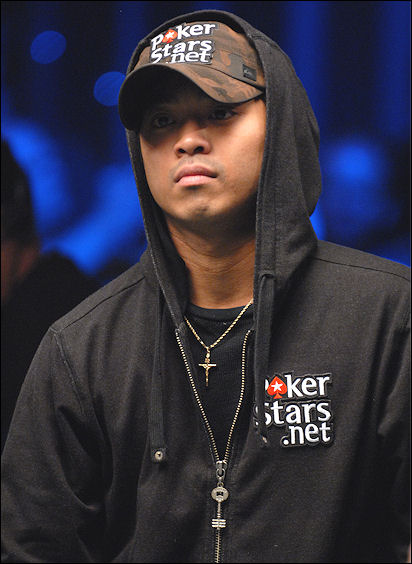
- Tran in 2008
- Born: November 4, 1981; Allentown, Pennsylvania, U.S.

World Series of Poker
- Bracelet: None
- Final tables: 5
- Money finishes: 40
- Highest WSOP Main Event finish: 105th, 2010

World Poker Tour
- Title: None
- Final tables: 2
- Money finishes: 2

Theo Tran, also known as Pittrounder, is a Vietnamese-American professional poker player.

== Early life and education ==
Tran was born November 4, 1981, in Allentown, Pennsylvania.

Tran attended and graduated from the University of Pittsburgh, where he received a bachelor's degree in communications and psychology and was a member of the Phi Kappa Theta social fraternity.

== Professional gaming career ==
After graduating from Pitt, Tran moved to Las Vegas, where he began gambling professionally. After accumulating winnings at various tournaments, Tran entered the World Series of Poker in 2007, where he won in excess of $387,000. In the 2012 WSOP, he was runner-up in a $1,500 No Limit Hold'em event for $377,565.

As of 2024, his live tournament winnings exceed $3 million.
