= Joseph Cheong =

Korean-American poker player (born 1986)

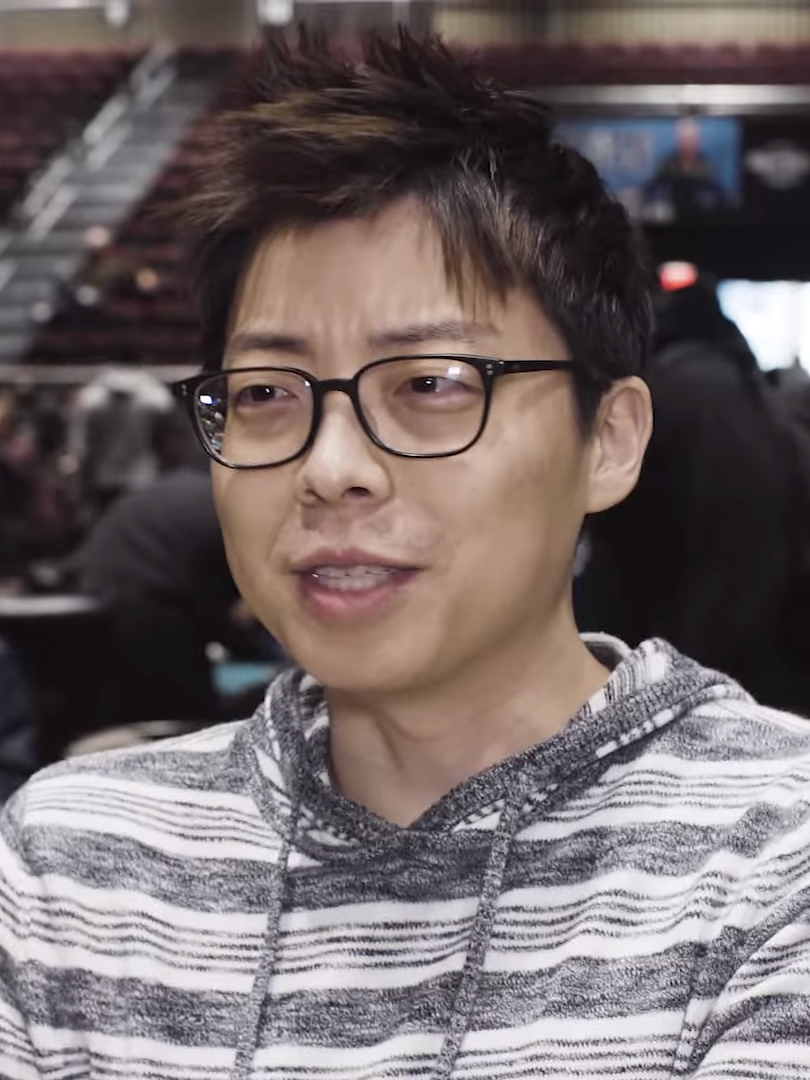
- Joseph Cheong in 2018
- Nicknames: subiime The 6bettor from Heaven
- Born: June 3, 1986 (age 40); Seoul, South Korea
- Client: World Series of Poker
- Performed: Rio All-Suite Hotel and Casino
- Melody: 3bet
- Key: All-in
World Series of Poker
- Bracelet: 1
- Final tables: 5
- Money finishes: 43
- Highest WSOP Main Event finish: 3rd, 2010
World Poker Tour
- Money finishes: 7
European Poker Tour
- Money finish: 1

Sanghyon "Joseph" Cheong (born June 3, 1986) is a Korean-American professional poker player who is a World Series of Poker bracelet winner and a former finalist at the WSOP Main Event.

Cheong was born in Seoul, South Korea before moving to the United States at the age of 6. He earned degrees in psychology, math and economics from the University of California, San Diego.

Cheong played online poker under the screen name "subiime," compiling winnings of $3.7 million.

Cheong plays a classic ultra-aggressive game - with small raise sizes resulting in 5 or sometimes 6 bets before the flop - as manifested in the 2010 WSOP Main Event when he made the November Nine. With the chip lead 3-handed, he six-bet all-in with A♠ 7♥ against the Q♣ Q♦ of Jonathan Duhamel and lost what was at the time the largest pot in WSOP history. He eventually finished in 3rd place, earning $4,130,049.

In 2012, Cheong finished runner-up in the $5,000 No Limit Hold'em Mixed Max event for $296,956. He was second in a $1,500 2-7 Draw Lowball event in 2014. Cheong finally won his first WSOP bracelet in 2019, outlasting a field of 6,214 in the $1,000 No Limit Hold'em Double Stack event to earn $687,782. He also finished fourth at the WSOP Europe Main Event in 2012 and has three WSOP circuit rings. In total, Cheong has 43 WSOP cashes and nearly $7 million in earnings.

As of 2019, Cheong's total live tournament winnings are nearly $14 million.

== World Series of Poker bracelets ==
Year	Tournament	Prize (US$)
2019	$1,000 Double Stack No Limit Hold'em	$687,782

== World Series of Poker Circuit rings ==
Year	Tournament	Prize (US$)
2010	$300 + 40 No Limit Hold'em	$17,541
2018	$2,200 No Limit Hold'em - High Roller (Event #13)	$65,399
2018	$365 No Limit Hold'em (Event #11)	$34,188
2021O	$1,000 No Limit Hold'em - High Roller 6-Max #12	$51,771

An "O" following a year denotes bracelet(s) won during the World Series of Poker Circuit Online
