= 2012 World Series of Poker Europe =

Series of poker tournaments

The sixth World Series of Poker Europe (WSOPE) took place from 21 September 2012 to 4 October 2012, at Hôtel Majestic Barrière and Le Croisette Casino Barrière in Cannes, France. There were seven bracelet events, culminating in a €10,450 No Limit Hold'em Main Event.

The Main Event was won by Phil Hellmuth, who increased his WSOP-record bracelet total to 13. He also became the first player ever to have won the Main Events of both the World Series of Poker in Las Vegas and the WSOPE; he claimed the Las Vegas Main Event title in 1989.

== Event schedule ==
#	Event	Entrants	Winner	Prize	Runner-up	Results	Reference
1	€2,700 Six Handed No Limit Hold'em	227	Imed Ben Mahmoud (1/1)	€147,099	Yannick Bonnet	Results	
2	€1,100 No Limit Hold'em	626	Antonio Esfandiari (2/3)	€126,207	Remi Bollengier	Results	
3	€5,300 Pot Limit Omaha	97	Roger Hairabedian (1/1)	€142,590	Ville Mattila	Results	
4	€3,250 No Limit Hold'em Shootout	141	Giovanni Rosadoni (1/1)	€107,614	Dan O'Brien	Results	
5	€10,450 Mixed Max No Limit Hold'em	96	Jonathan Aguiar (1/1)	€258,047	Brandon Cantu (0/2)	Results	
6	€1,650 Six Handed Pot Limit Omaha	206	Francisco Da Costa Santos (1/1)	€83,275	Ana Marquez	Results	
7	€10,450 No Limit Hold'em Main Event	420	Phil Hellmuth (2/13)	€1,022,376	Sergii Baranov	Results	

== Main Event ==
The 2012 World Series of Poker Europe Main Event began on 29 September and finished on 4 October. The event drew 420 entrants, generating a prize pool of €4,032,000. The top 48 players made the money, with the winner earning €1,022,376.

=== Final table ===
Name	Number of chips (percentage of total)	WSOP Bracelets*	WSOP Cashes*	WSOP Earnings*
(United States) Phil Hellmuth	3,434,000 (27.2%)	12	95	$10,904,904
(Ukraine) Sergii Baranov	3,339,000 (26.5%)	0	0	0
(United States) Joseph Cheong	1,966,000 (15.6%)	0	11	$4,663,030
(France) Stephane Albertini	1,162,000 (9.2%)	0	1	$160,036
(United Kingdom) Christopher Brammer	851,000 (6.7%)	0	4	$276,065
(France) Stephane Girault	664,000 (5.3%)	0	0	0
(United States) Jason Mercier	652,000 (5.2%)	2	30	$1,903,294
(France) Paul Tedeschi	543,000 (4.3%)	0	1	$26,671

*-Career statistics prior to beginning of 2012 WSOPE Main Event

=== Final Table results ===
Place	Name	Prize
1st	Phil Hellmuth (2/13)	€1,022,376
2nd	Sergii Baranov	€632,592
3rd	Stephane Albertini	€423,360
4th	Joseph Cheong	€292,320
5th	Christopher Brammer	€207,648
6th	Paul Tedeschi	€149,184
7th	Stephane Girault	€108,864
8th	Jason Mercier (0/2)	€84,672
