= Oleksii Kovalchuk =

Ukrainian poker player (born 1989)

- Born: 18 September 1989 (age 37)

World Series of Poker
- Bracelets: 2
- Money finishes: 7

Oleksii Kovalchuk (born 18 September 1989) is a professional poker player from Ukraine who won the 2011 World Series of Poker $2,500 No Limit Hold'em Six Handed event, earning $689,739 and also winning the 2012 World Series of Poker $2,500 Omaha/Seven Card Stud Hi/Lo event, earning $228,014. Kovalchuk is the only Ukrainian to have won multiple World Series of Poker bracelets.

As of 2025, his total live tournament winnings exceed $2,600,000. His 7 cashes at the World Series of Poker account for $976,420 of those winnings.

== World Series of Poker bracelets ==
Year	Tournament	Prize
2011	$2,500 No Limit Hold'em Six Handed	$689,739
2012	$2,500 Omaha /Seven Card Stud Hi/Lo	$228,014
