= Xuan Liu (poker player) =

Chinese-Canadian female poker player

- 刘璇
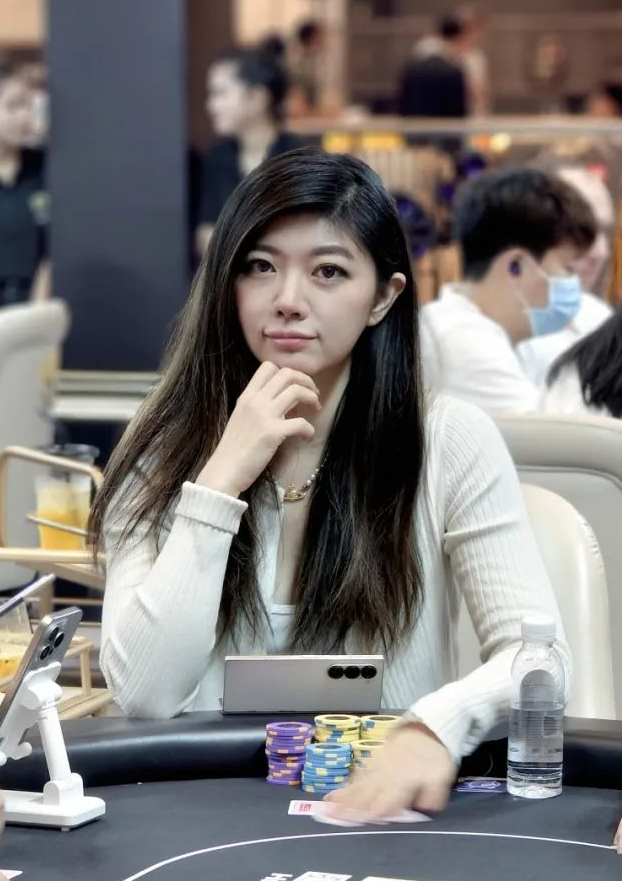
- Born: June 25, 1985 (age 41); Tianjin, China
- Education: University of Waterloo
- Occupation: Poker Player
- Years active: 2010 - Present
- Nicknames: 刘璇璇, xx23, xxl23

World Series of Poker
- Bracelet: None
- Final table: 1
- Money finishes: 25

World Poker Tour
- Money finishes: 6

European Poker Tour
- Final tables: 2
- Money finishes: 6

Chinese name
- Simplified Chinese: 刘璇
- Traditional Chinese: 劉璇
Transcriptions
Standard Mandarin
- Hanyu Pinyin: liú xuán
- Website: https://xxl.carrd.co/

Xuan Liu (simplified Chinese: 刘璇; traditional Chinese: 劉璇; pinyin: Liú Xuán; born June 25, 1985) is a Chinese-Canadian professional poker player whose winnings put her in the top 20 of women poker players, with over $3 million.

She is also the only woman to reach the final table at the PokerStars Caribbean Adventure main event. In 2025 she became the first woman to win a Triton Super High Roller Series title.

== Early life and education ==
Liu was born in Tianjin, China and immigrated to Toronto, Canada, at the age of five. Raised in a household that valued strategic games, she learned card games, chess, and go during her childhood—a cultural foundation she later credited for her analytical approach to poker.

Liu has said that her love of poker began in childhood, recalling "I’d pretend like I had limited information for each party and make decisions based on hypothetical scenarios as to what each stuffed animal would do." According to her sister Anny, she was always very competitive.

Liu studied political science at the University of Waterloo from 2003 to 2008. She played online poker throughout her time at university, and hosted home games with other known poker players such as Glen Chorny, Steve Paul and Michael McDonald.

Though Mandarin is her native language, Liu has said that she prefers teaching poker in English, finding greater fluency for explaining complex strategies.

== Poker career ==
Since 2010, Liu has cashed at over 90 poker tournaments and won six titles. She started focusing on live tournaments in early 2011. Her 2011 events included winning third place at the European Poker Tournament San Remo. The placement at the final table gave her a win of just over half a million dollars. It was her first cash main event with the EPT.

Liu joined Natural8 Poker's professional team "Team Hot" in October 2016 as part of the brand's Asia-Pacific expansion. From April 2016 to December 2018, she represented the platform alongside teammates Kitty Kuo and Dong Kim, promoting the brand through live tournament appearances and Twitch streams.

Liu was affiliated with 888poker from April 2014 until February 2015. She became a new ambassador alongside fellow professional Sofia Lövgren on April 14, 2014, joining Team 888poker to promote the brand in various live events and online platforms.

Between 2011 and 2018, Liu made over $100,000 in four different years. Between 2018 and 2024, Xuan Liu stepped away from full-time professional poker and went on a hiatus, during which time she was married to a fellow poker player; the marriage has since ended.

In May 2025, she became the first woman to win a Triton Poker title. Her victory came in the $25K WPT Global Slam tournament in Montenegro, earning her a career-high prize of $860,000.

Liu was a WPT global ambassador from May 2024 to May 2025.

Liu finished fourth in the 2012 PokerStars Caribbean Adventure Main Event, earning $600,000. In February 2017 she won the CAD$2,500 event at the WPT Fallsview Poker Classic in Niagara Falls, Ontario, for a first prize of $232,114. During her time away from full-time poker, she earned a real estate licence and worked in commercial real estate in Toronto. In 2022 she became an instructor and board member for Poker Power, an organization that aims to teach a million women to play poker. That same year she finished third in a $10,000 No-Limit Hold'em event at the Poker Masters for $96,200, and she has since appeared on streamed and televised cash games including High Stakes Poker. She also became the first person to play poker in every Canadian province and territory, a challenge she filmed for her YouTube channel. In February 2026, Liu publicly criticized WPT Global for continuing to use her image in promotional graphics after her ambassador contract had ended. On April 9, 2026, Ignition Casino announced her as its new ambassador. As of October 2026, her live tournament earnings were over $3.4 million.

== Advocacy ==
Liu has been involved in efforts to increase female participation in professional poker. As a visible female poker in high-stakes tournaments, she has emphasized skill development over gender in the game. In interviews, she has stated that women should not hesitate to play aggressively, saying "You can be competitive without compromising your integrity—taking chips doesn’t make you a bad person."

During her tenure as a WPT Global Ambassador (2024–2025), Liu focused on expanding poker’s reach in emerging markets, particularly China, where she observed higher female participation compared to Western events. She also engaged in mentorship, stating, "I like interacting with fans so they have someone to look up to." In Chinese media, she is sometimes referred to by the nickname "Liu Xuan Xuan" (刘璇璇).
