= European Poker Tour season 2 results =

EPT Season 2
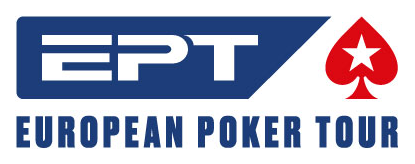
- League: European Poker Tour
- Sport: Poker
- Duration: September 9, 2005 – March 11, 2006
- Total attendance: 2,017 (Main Event only)

Statistics
- Countries: Spain - Barcelona; United Kingdom - London; Austria - Baden; Ireland - Dublin; Denmark - Copenhague; France - Deauville; Monaco - Monte Carlo
- Top Season 2 Money List: (United States) Jeff Williams ($1,084,036)

EPT seasons
- ← Season 1 Season 3 →

Below are the results of the second season of the European Poker Tour (EPT). All currency amounts are in "€" Euro, U$ Dollar (and local currency when apply).

== Results ==
=== (Spain) EPT Barcelona Open ===
- Casino: Casino Barcelona. Barcelona, Spain
- Buy-in: €4,000+200 (~$5,208)
- 10-Day Event: Friday, September 9, 2005 to Sunday, September 18, 2005
- 2-Day Main Event: Friday, September 16, 2005 to Saturday, September 17, 2005
- Number of buy-ins: 327
- Total Prize Pool: €1,309,200 (~$1,623,256)
- Number of Payouts: 27
- Winning Hand: K♦ Q♥
- Board: 8♦ 2♣ 8♥ 10♣ Q♦
- Losing Hand: A♠ 2♠
- Official Results: The Hendom Mob
- Videos:

EPT Barcelona Season 2 (Barcelona Open 2005) - DAY 1 (1h09m05s)
EPT Barcelona Season 2 (Barcelona Open 2005) - FINAL TABLE (1h10m53s)

Barcelona sell out: European Poker Tour launches with record turn out.

The first prize of €416,000 was won by former dentist Jan Boubli, 51, from Paris. Cheered on by a large French crowd, Jan was close to tears as he picked up the biggest tournament prize of his career.

The record EPT turn-out, which included 33 PokerStars.com qualifiers, generated a total prize pool of €1,300,000, over five times more than the 2004 tournament.

The first event of season two of the EPT featured a host of celebrities including three-time WPT winner Gus Hansen, WPT Ladies’ champion Isabelle Mercier, Dutch poker legend Marcel Lüske, Britain’s Dave ‘Devilfish’ Ulliott and Rob Hollink, winner of the 2005 EPT Monte Carlo Grand Final.

The huge crowds of poker players, many from Scandinavia, exceeded all expectations. Tournament director Thomas Kremser said:“No-one could have estimated that so many players would make their way to Barcelona for the start of the European Poker Tour. It is incredible.”

EPT founder John Duthie said: “We knew by the end of the first EPT that the tour was a massive hit, but today’s turn-out is simply extraordinary. Players were queuing up for hours to register and we still had a struggle to accommodate everyone. It’s fantastic.”

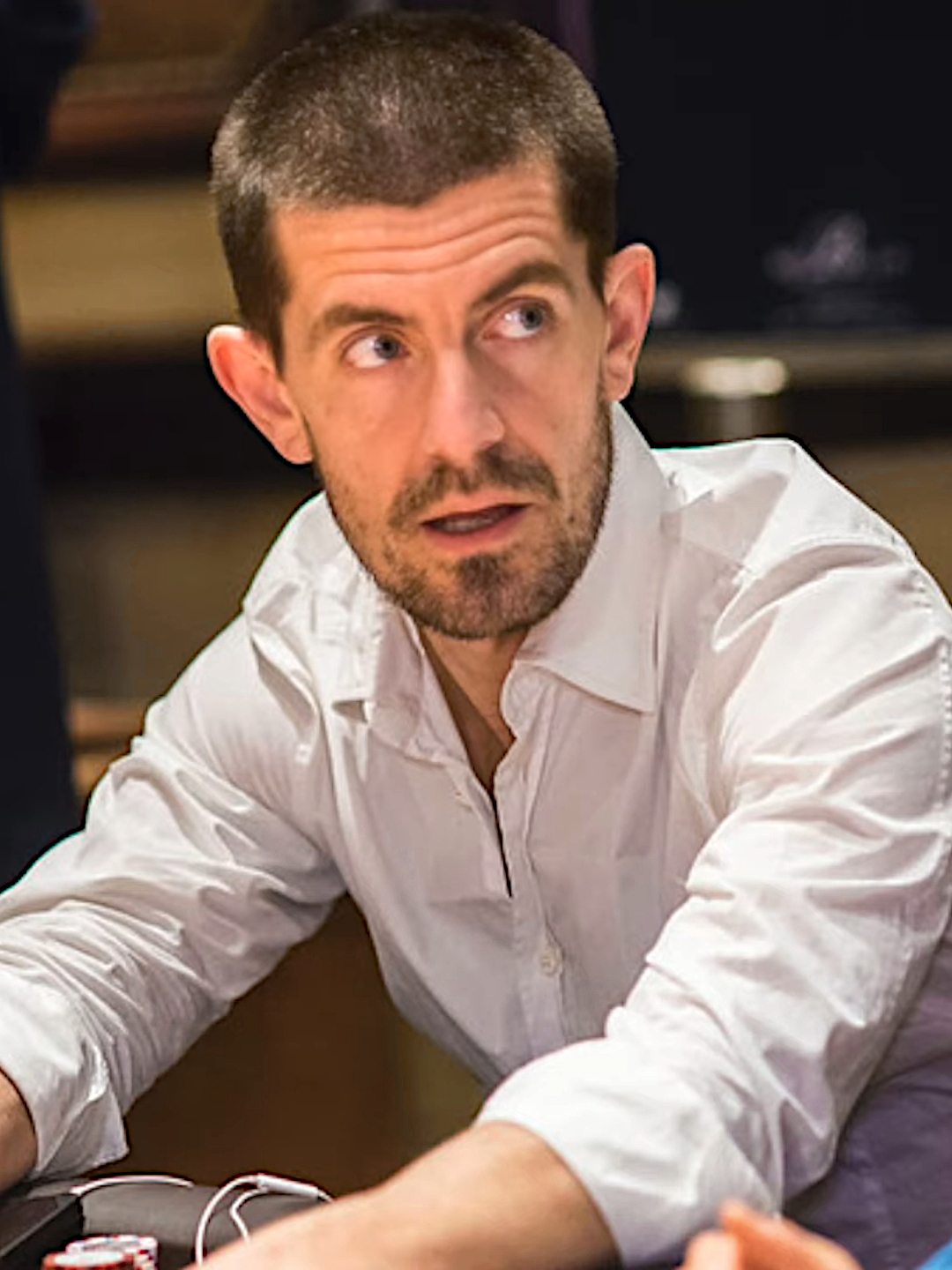
5th place: Gus Hansen

Final Table
Place	Name	Original Prize	Prize (U$D)
1st	(France) Jan Boubli	€426,000	$528,195
2nd	(Sweden) Christer Johansson	€228,000	$282,696
3rd	(Finland) Patrik Antonius	€117,000	$145,067
4th	(Sweden) Patrick Martenson	€91,000	$112,830
5th	(Denmark) Gus Hansen	€78,000	$96,711
6th	(Sweden) Anton Bergstroem	€65,000	$80,593
7th	(Italy) Dario Alioto	€52,000	$64,474
8th	(Spain) Romain Feriolo	€39,000	$48,355

=== (United Kingdom) EPT London The Grosvenor World Masters ===
- Casino: The Poker Room formerly The Vic, London, United Kingdom
- Buy-in: £3,000+50 (~€4,485) (~$5,402)
- 7-Day Event: Monday, September 26, 2005 to Sunday, October 2, 2005
- 3-Day Main Event: Friday, September 30, 2005 to Sunday, October 2, 2005
- Number of buy-ins: 242
- Total Prize Pool: £708,630 (~€1.042.097) (~$1,255,123)
- Number of Payouts: 24
- Winning Hand: J♦ J♠
- Board: Q♦ 2♦ 6♠ J♣ 5♣
- Losing Hand: K♦ 4♦
- Official Results: The Hendom Mob
- Videos:

YouTube: EPT London Season 2 (The Grosvenor World Masters) - DAY 1 (1h11m01)
YouTube: EPT London Season 2 (The Grosvenor World Masters) - DAY 2 (58m07)
YouTube: EPT London Season 2 (The Grosvenor World Masters) - FINAL TABLE (1h11m06)

The tournament was divided by two initial day with 118 players each plus the online qualifiers by PokerStars who couldn't attend the event. The total players was 242. At the final table 2 players was qualifying online, Graham Clarckson and Istvan Novak.

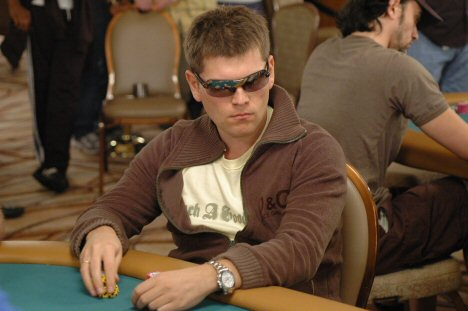
5th place: Kirill Gerasimov

Final Table
Place	Name	Original Prize	Prize (€uro)	Prize (U$D)
1st	(England) Mark Teltscher	£280,000	€411,762	$495,935
2nd	(Norway) Jonas Helness	£145,740	€214,322	$258,134
3rd	(United States) Noah Jefferson	£72,870	€107,161	$129,067
4th	(England) Paul King	£41,640	€61,234	$73,753
5th	(Russia) Kirill Gerasimov	£24,290	€35,720	$43,022
6th	(England) Dale Greenleaf	£20,820	€30,617	$36,876
7th	(Hungary) Istvan Novak	£17,350	€25,515	$30,730
8th	(Scotland) Graham Clarkson	£13,889	€20,425	$24,600

= PokerStars Online Qualifier

=== (Austria) EPT Baden Classic ===
- Casino: Casinos Austria, Baden, Austria
- Buy-in: €4,000+190 (~$6,545)
- 3-Day Event: Thursday, October 4, 2005 to Thursday, October 6, 2005
- 3-Day Main Event: Thursday, October 4, 2005 to Thursday, October 6, 2005
- Number of buy-ins: 180
- Total Prize Pool: €720,000 (~$1,124,630)
- Number of Payouts: 27
- Winning Hand: 8♠ 4♥
- Board: 4♠ 7♠ 8♥ 3♣ 7♣
- Losing Hand: Q♥ 9♣
- Official Results: The Hendom Mob
- Videos:

YouTube: EPT Baden Season 2 (Poker EM/EPT Baden Classic) - Final table (1h10m49s)

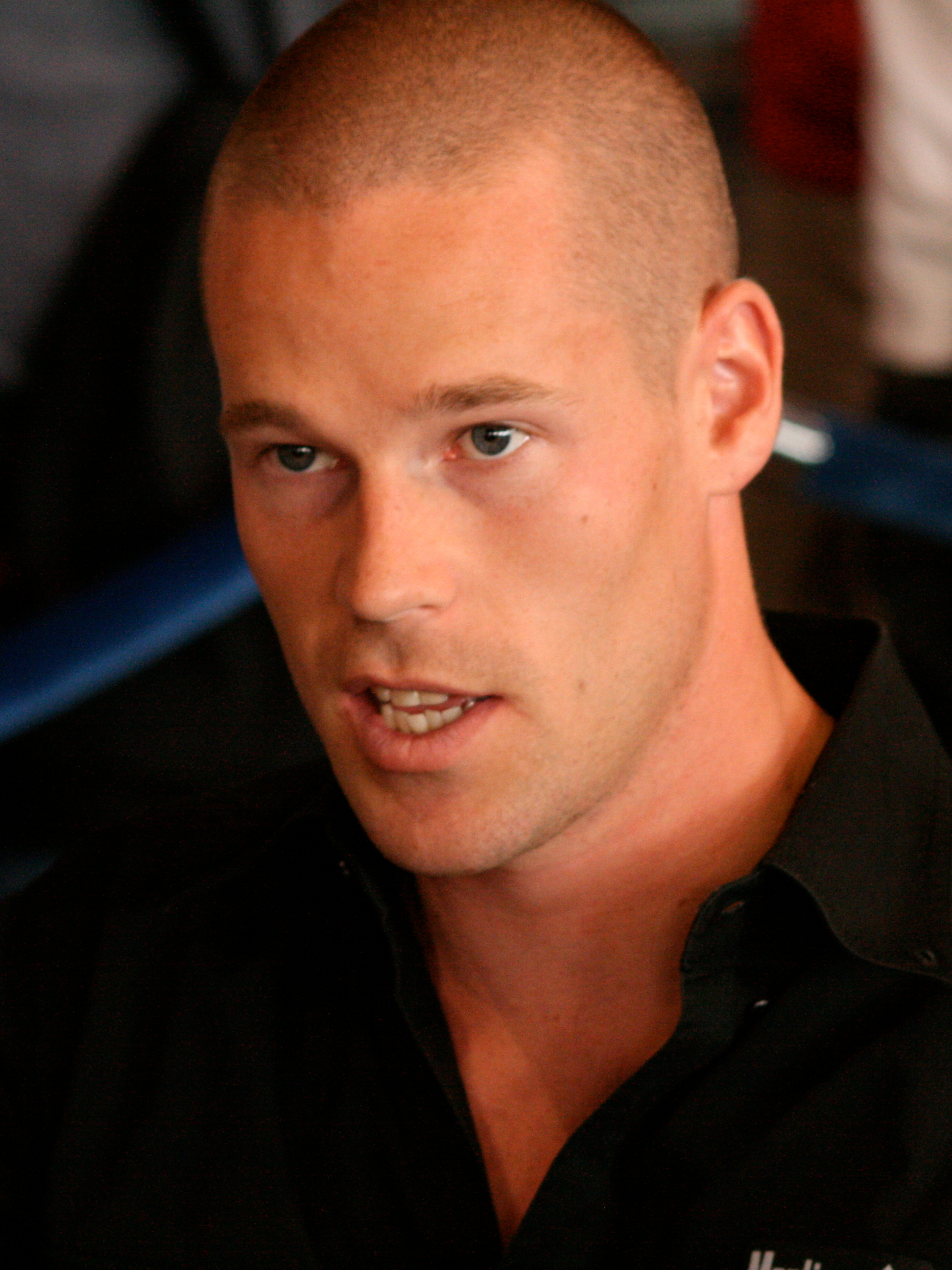
Winner: Patrik Antonius

Final Table
Place	Name	Original Prize	Prize (U$D)
1st	(Finland) Patrik Antonius	€288,180	$343,365
2nd	(Norway) Gunnar Ostebrod	€120,384	$143,437
3rd	(Netherlands) Abel Meijberg	€61,560	$73,348
4th	(Denmark) Christian Grundtvig	€47,880	$57,048
5th	(Sweden) Ingemar Backman	€41,040	$48,899
6th	(Austria) Peter Muhlbek	€34,200	$40,749
7th	(Norway) Torstein Iversen	€27,360	$32,599
8th	(Norway) Edgar Skjervold	€20,520	$24,449

=== (Republic of Ireland) EPT Dublin The Irish Winter Festival 2005 ===
- Casino: Merrion Casino Club, Dublin, Ireland
- Buy-in: €4,000+200 (~$5,068)
- 4-Day Event: Thursday, October 27, 2005 to Sunday, October 30, 2005
- 2-Day Main Event: Saturday, October 29, 2005 to Sunday, October 30, 2005
- Number of buy-ins: 248
- Total Prize Pool: €992,000(~$1,197,041)
- Number of Payouts: 27
- Winning Hand: A♥ 9♣
- Board: 8♦ 3♠ 7♥ 3♣ 5♦
- Losing Hand: K♠ 9♦
- Official Results: The Hendom Mob
- Video: YouTube: EPT Dublin Season 2 (The Irish Winter Festival of Poker 2005) - Final table (1h10m38s)

Final Table
Place	Name	Original Prize	Prize (U$D)
1st	(Sweden) Mats Gavatin	€317,000	$382,522
2nd	(Sweden) Henrik Olander	€174,500	$210,568
3rd	(England) David Pomroy	€89,300	$107,758
4th	(Republic of Ireland) Joe Rafferty	€69,500	$83,865
5th	(England) Peter Haslam	€59,500	$71,798
6th	(Republic of Ireland) Jim Reid	€49,600	$59,852
7th	(England) Michael Greco	€39,800	$48,026
8th	(Republic of Ireland) Michael O'Sullivan	€29,800	$35,960

=== (Denmark) EPT Copenhagen Scandinavian Open ===
- Casino: Casino Copenhagen, Copenhagen, Denmark
- Buy-in: DKr.30,000 (~€4,020) (~$4,867)
- 5-Day Event: Wednesday, January 18, 2006 to Sunday, January 22, 2006
- 4-Day Main Event: Thursday, January 19, 2006 to Sunday, January 22, 2006
- Number of buy-ins: 288
- Total Prize Pool: DKr.7,932,624 (~€1,062,972) (~$1,287,135)
- Number of Payouts: 27
- Winning Hand: A♦ Q♣
- Board: K♥ 4♥ 9♥ Q♦ 10♣
- Losing Hand: A♠ 10♥
- Official Results: The Hendom Mob
- Videos:

YouTube: EPT Copenhagen Season 2 (EPT Scandinavian Open) - Day 1 (1h10m32)
YouTube: EPT Copenhagen Season 2 (EPT Scandinavian Open) - Final table (1h09m34s)

Final Table
Place	Name	Original Prize	Prize (€uro)	Prize (U$D)
1st	(Denmark) Mads Andersen	DKr.2,548,040	€341,437	$413,442
2nd	(Norway) Edgar Skjervold	DKr.1,401,422	€187,790	$227,393
3rd	(Netherlands) Marcus Naalden	DKr.716,636	€96,029	$116,280
4th	(Denmark) Phillip Hilm	DKr.557,384	€74,689	$90,440
5th	(United States) Markus Gonsalves	DKr.447,757	€60,000	$72,652
6th	(Denmark) Anina Gundesen	DKr.398,131	€53,349	$64,600
7th	(Denmark) Shek Chi Hung	DKr.318,505	€42,680	$51,680
8th	(Sweden) Johan Berqvist	DKr.238,879	€32,010	$38,760

= PokerStars Online Qualifier

=== (France) EPT Deauville French Open ===
- Casino: Casino Barrière de Deauville, Deauville, France
- Buy-in: €4,000 (~$4,789)
- 5-Day Event: Tuesday, February 7, 2006 to Saturday, February 11, 2006
- 4-Day Main Event: Wednesday, February 8, 2006 to Saturday, February 11, 2006
- Number of buy-ins: 434
- Total Prize Pool: €1,610,300 (~$1,928,038)
- Number of Payouts: 40
- Winning Hand: A♠ 3♣
- Board: 5♠ Q♠ 3♠ K♥ 2♠
- Losing Hand: J♥ 10♣
- Official Results: The Hendom Mob
- Videos:

YouTube: EPT Deauville Season 2 (EPT French Open) - Day 1 (1h10m36)
YouTube: EPT Deauville Season 2 (EPT French Open) - Day 2 (1h10m57s)
YouTube: EPT Deauville Season 2 (EPT French Open) - Final table (1h11m43s)

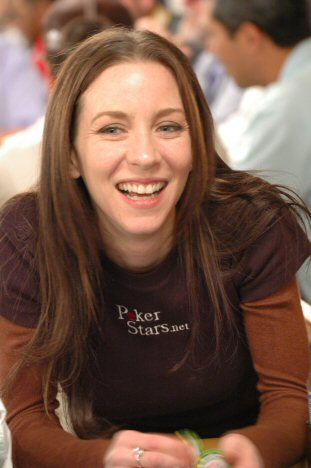
Team PokerStars: Isabelle Mercier

Final Table
Place	Name	Original Prize	Prize (U$D)
1st	(Sweden) Mats Iremark	€490,000	$586,686
2nd	(Netherlands) Mark Boudewijn	€259,000	$310,105
3rd	(Russia) Kirill Gerasimov	€155,000	$185,584
4th	(Denmark) Theo Jørgensen	€118,300	$141,643
5th	(England) Ram Vaswani	€97,700	$116,978
6th	(Sweden) Patrick Martenson	€76,800	$91,954
7th	(Canada) Isabelle Mercier	€60,800	$72,797
8th	(England) Stuart Nash	€43,500	$52,083

= Team PokerStars

=== (Monaco) EPT Monte Carlo Grand Final ===
- Casino: Monte-Carlo Bay Hotel & Resort, Monte Carlo, Monaco
- Buy-in: €10,000 (€9,600+€400) (~$12,045)
- 6-Day Event: Monday, March 6, 2006 to Saturday, March 11, 2006
- 5-Day Main Event: Tuesday, March 7, 2006 to Saturday, March 11, 2006
- Number of buy-ins: 298
- Total Prize Pool: €2,801,200 (~$3,374,005)
- Number of Payouts: 27
- Winning Hand: A♦ 10♣
- Board: 5♥ 9♥ 7♠ 7♦ 3♣
- Losing Hand: A♥ 8♦
- Official Results: The Hendom Mob
- Videos:

YouTube: EPT Monte Carlo Season 2 (European Poker Tour Grand Final) - Day 1 (51m57s)
YouTube: EPT Monte Carlo Season 2 (European Poker Tour Grand Final) - Day 2 (50m12s)
YouTube: EPT Monte Carlo Season 2 (European Poker Tour Grand Final) - Day 3 (52m01s)
YouTube: EPT Monte Carlo Season 2 (European Poker Tour Grand Final) - Final table (51m10s)

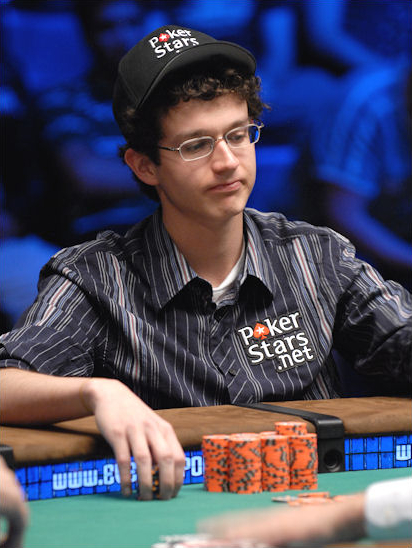
Winner: Jeff Williams

Final Table
Place	Name	Original Prize	Prize (U$D)
1st	(United States) Jeff Williams	€900,000	$1,084,036
2nd	(England) Arshad Hussain	€492,000	$592,606
3rd	(Norway) Aleksander Strandli	€251,000	$302,325
4th	(Canada) Marc Karam	€195,000	$234,874
5th	(France) Thierry Cazals	€168,000	$202,353
6th	(England) Ross Boatman	€140,000	$168,627
7th	(Netherlands) Marcel Lüske	€112,000	$134,902
8th	(England) Fraser Dunphy	€84,000	$101,176

= PokerStars Qualifier
