= Vamplew =

Vamplew is a surname. Notable people with the surname include:

- Anton Vamplew (born 1966), an English amateur astronomer
- David Vamplew (born 1987), a Scottish poker player
- Desmond Vamplew (born 1955), a Canadian sports shooter
- Pat Vamplew (born 1952), a Canadian sports shooter
