= Michael Martin (poker player) =

American poker player

- Nickname: Martine23
- Born: Merrick, New York, U.S.

World Series of Poker
- Bracelet: None
- Money finishes: 8
- Highest WSOP Main Event finish: 232nd, 2006

European Poker Tour
- Title: 1
- Final tables: 3
- Money finishes: 3

Michael Martin (born in Merrick, New York) is an American professional poker player from Washington Crossing, Pennsylvania who was the winner at the European Poker Tour (EPT) £5,200 EPT London Main Event earning £1,000,000.

== Poker ==
=== World Series of Poker ===
Martin has cashed eight times at the WSOP, most notably finishing in 232nd place at the 2006 World Series of Poker Main Event earning $42,882 out of a field of 8,773 entries and finishing runner-up at the $5,000 No Limit Hold'em WSOP Circuit Championship event earning $94,263.

=== European Poker Tour ===
Martin has made three final tables at the European Poker Tour, his first was at the EPT Grand Final, in Monte Carlo in season 4 finishing 5th for €421,000 ($666,171) with a final table that included online professional poker player Isaac "westmenloAA" Baron (4th), Luca Pagano (6th), Antonio Esfandiari (8th) and the winner Glen Chorny. Then later winning the 2008 EPT London event in season 5, earning £1,000,000 ($1,831,099) in a final table which included Team Pokerstars Pro member Marcin Horecki (3rd) and WSOP bracelet winner Alan Smurfit (6th).

=== Master Classics of Poker ===
In November 2007, Martin was runner up at Amsterdam's Master Classics of Poker earning $531,961. The Master Classics of Poker is organized by the Holland Casino Amsterdam.

=== Epic Poker League ===
In 2011, the Epic Poker League was launched. It is a series of poker tournaments begun in 2011 by Federated Sports + Gaming. The League is exclusionary in that it is only open to poker players who have met certain qualification criteria based on earnings, final tables and other criteria. Comparing itself to the PGA of Golf, this new league will be the avenue for the top professional poker players in the world to compete against each other. To date, 218 of the world's best live tournament players have already qualified for the Epic Poker League and Martin was included in the initial induction to this league. This inclusion ranks him amongst the top 218 tournament players in the world.

As of 2008, his total live tournament winnings exceed $3,200,000.
