= Langstaff Secondary School =

- thumb

Location
- 106 Garden Avenue; Richmond Hill, Ontario, L4C 6M1; Canada; 43°50′14″N 79°26′21″W

Information
- School type: High school
- Religious affiliation: Non
- Established: 1964
- School board: York Region District School Board
- Superintendent: Michael Grieve
- Area trustee: Cindy Liang
- School number: 921661
- Principal: S. Epstein
- Grades: 9-12
- Enrolment: 575 (January 2024)
- Language: English, French Immersion
- Colours: Blue, Gold and White
- Mascot: Bear
- Website: www.yrdsb.ca/schools/langstaff.ss/
- Last updated: January 2024

Langstaff Secondary School (LSS) is a public high school in Richmond Hill, Ontario, Canada.

== Academics ==
=== French Immersion ===
Langstaff Secondary School was one of six schools in the York District to offer a French Immersion curriculum. Upon successful completion of the requisite French Immersion courses, students are eligible to receive a French Immersion Certificate. At the start of the 2025/2026 school year, Langstaff cancelled their French Immersion progam in favor of including IB (International Baccalaurate). Students already enrolled in French Immersion are able to finish their French Immersion.

=== Advanced Placement ===
Langstaff Secondary School offers the Advanced Placement programme to its students. The school offers AP courses in Biology, English, French and Math (Calculus and Vectors). Like other AP programmes, students who complete the Grade 12 AP courses are eligible to write the AP exam.

== Notable alumni ==
- Jonathan D'Aversa, hockey player for the Pittsburgh Penguins
- Gillian Ferrari, hockey player
- Melissa Lantsman, Member of Parliament for Thornhill
- Tracy Moore, TV personality
- Poorya Nazari, professional poker player
- Theo Peckham, former hockey player for the Edmonton Oilers
- Justin Trottier, political candidate, public speaker and media personality

== See also ==
- Education in Ontario
- List of secondary schools in Ontario
