= 2007–08 World Series of Poker Circuit =

Series of poker tournaments

The 2007–08 World Series of Poker Circuit is the 4th annual World Series of Poker Circuit.

== Event schedule ==
| Date | Location | Winner | Prize | Runner-up | Other Finalists |
|---|---|---|---|---|---|
| September 13, 2007 | Grand Casino Tunica | Jordan Morgan | $216,852 | Terry Hawkins | Jerry Saucier; Gil George; Glyn Banks; Brian Rutland; Jeff Cohen; Steve Hyvonen; Mark Garner |
| November 2, 2007 | Caesars Indiana | Carlos Uz | $175,034 | Marc Fratter | Vito Casullo Jr.; Terry Ogle; Chris Moore; Chris Viox; James Lindsey; Tom Schneider; Thomas Hover |
| November 18, 2007 | Harrah's Lake Tahoe | Chris Ferguson | $203,649 | Dustin Fox | Mark Bonsack; Sylvester Geoghegan; Gabriel Testa; Michael Banducci; George Saca; Frank Lee; Travis Erdman |
| December 5, 2007 | Harrah's New Orleans | Andy Philachack | $247,860 | Josh Arieh | Ted McCollom; David Fox; Leonard Pruzansky; Nic Gellepis; Bruce MacGregor; Philip Sparta; Louie Esposito |
| December 18, 2007 | Harrah's Atlantic City | John Racener | $379,392 | Eric Buchman | Feming Chan; Joseph Brooks; Thomas Fee; David Fox; Adrian Velez; James Nelson; Sam Skolnik |
| January 22, 2008 | Grand Casino Tunica | Bart Tichelman | $428,210 | Donald Nicholson | Giovanni Maracci; John Devia; Ben Sabrin; Mark Garner; Ryan Young; Tom Schneider; Jordan Rich |
| February 7, 2008 | Harrah's Rincon San Diego North | Mike Pickett | $229,002 | David Peters | Edward Sabat; Kenny Bedoya; Christian Avendano; Gavin Smith; Lee Watkinson; Damien Oborne; Jon Eaton; Richard Morgan |
| February 27, 2008 | Horseshoe Council Bluffs | Ben Hock | $169,327 | Michael Martin | Nicholas Manganaro; Bernard Lee; Keith Murrell; Samuel Shamburg; Dan Jensen; Ron Koenemann; Howard Wolper |
| March 15, 2008 | Caesars Atlantic City | Eric Haber | $431,136 | Dan Hicks | Sumeet Batra; Soheil Shamseddin; Steve Greenberg; Nick Binger; Scott Blackman; Steven Merrifield; Marc Morris |
| April 14, 2008 | Caesars Indiana | Wilbur Futhey | $180,289 | Steve Merrifield | Dale Poynter; Douglas Carli; Ben Hock; Jason Mann; Giovanni Marcacci; Jerry Martin; Michael Iacovone |
| May 1, 2008 | Caesars Las Vegas | Allen Cunningham | $499,162 | Ben Fineman | Kelly Samson; Motoyuki Mabuchi; Justin Bonomo; Blair Hinkle; Thomas Hover; Ralph Perry; Doug Lee |
| May 21, 2008 | Harrah's New Orleans | Nick Ceci | $382,928 | Timothy Miles | Floyd Vanderford; Gabe Costner; Jeff Tims; Lou Esposito; Chuck Kelley; Ed Jatho; Marc Fratter |
