= Atanas Gueorguiev =

Bulgarian poker player

- Born: Sofia

World Poker Tour
- Title: None
- Final table: 1
- Money finishes: 13

European Poker Tour
- Title: None
- Final tables: 6
- Money finishes: 21

Atanas "naskoxx" Gueorguiev is a Bulgarian professional poker player. Gueorguiev is currently living in Sofia, Bulgaria and travels often to play poker.

== Poker career ==
His first prize ever was in early 2006. Ever since he successfully became a familiar figure on both the European Poker Tour and World Poker Tour circuits. He is also considered as one of the best Bulgarian poker players of all time. He is currently number 3 on the all-time Bulgarian poker rankings. Gueorguiev is sponsored by Unibet.

=== European Poker Tour ===
His best European Poker Tour prize so far was in 2010 and was played in Sanremo. He finished at 8th place, taking more than $122,000. Besides that, he won six more Main Event prizes. Closest to 1st position was in November 2008, when he finished 4th for more than $110,000 in the European Poker Tour Season 5 Main Event - Warsaw.

=== World Poker Tour ===
His best WPT title so far is from June 2009 and was played in Spain; he finished 1st for $72,912. Besides that he won seven more notable WPT prizes.

As of 2015, his total live tournament winnings exceed $1,150,000. His total amount of ITM is 53.
