= PokerStars Championship =

Global poker tournament

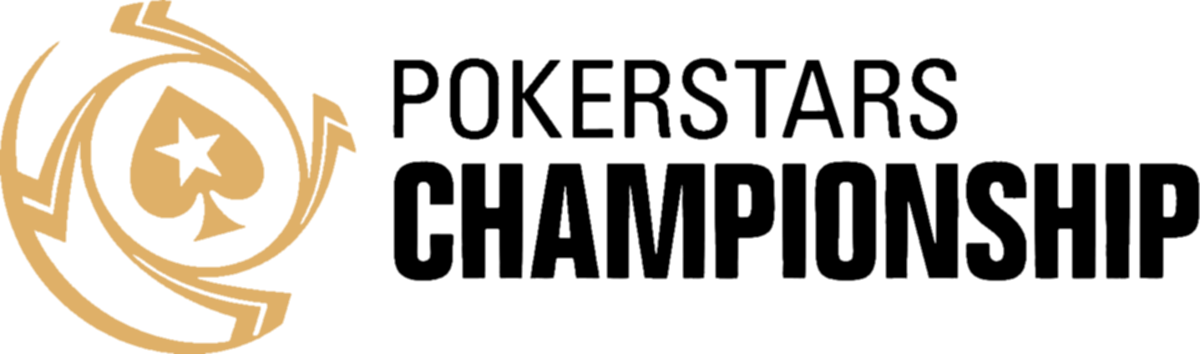
- Sport: Texas Hold 'em
- Founded: 2017
- Folded: 2017
- Website: pokerstarslive.com

The PokerStars Championship was a series of global poker tournaments which began in 2017. The formation of the series was announced in August 2016, when PokerStars revealed that the European Poker Tour and other poker tours were being rebranded. Seven tournament festivals were played in the inaugural season, in the Bahamas, Panama, Macau, Monte Carlo, Sochi, Barcelona and Prague. PokerStars also announced another series of tournaments, PokerStars Festival, which features lower buy-in events. The series was discontinued after the inaugural season.

== PSC Main Event winners ==
Season	Date	Event and location	Main event winner	Prize
1	6–14 January 2017	(The Bahamas) PokerStars Championship Bahamas	(United States) Christian Harder	$429,664
1	14–20 March 2017	Panama	(United States) Kenneth Smaron	$293,860
1	1–9 April 2017	Macau	(Canada) Elliot Smith	HKD2,877,500
1	29 April–5 May 2017	(Monaco) Monte Carlo	(Italy) Raffaele Sorrentino	€466,714
1	25–31 May 2017	(Russia) Sochi	(Russia) Pavel Shirshikov	₽29,100,000
1	21–27 August 2017	(Spain) Barcelona	(Sweden) Sebastian Sorensson	€987,043
1	12–18 December 2017	(Czech Republic) Prague	(France) Kalidou Sow	€675,000

== Results ==
=== (The Bahamas) Bahamas ===
- Venue: Atlantis Resort, Paradise Island, Bahamas
- Buy-in: $5,000
- 7-Day Event: January 6–14, 2017
- Number of buy-ins: 738
- Total Prize Pool: $3,376,712
- Number of Payouts: 143

Final table
Place	Name	Prize
1st	(United States) Christian Harder	$429,664*
2nd	(United States) Cliff Josephy	$403,448*
3rd	(United States) Michael Vela	$259,980
4th	(Russia) Aleksei Opalikhin	$191,420
5th	(Canada) Michael Gentili	$140,940
6th	(Norway) Rasmus Glaesel	$103,780
7th	(Canada) Allon Allison	$76,400
8th	(United States) John Dibella	$56,260

*Deal between the final two players.

=== Panama ===
- Venue: Sortis Hotel, Panama City, Panama
- Buy-in: $5,300
- 7-Day Event: March 14–20, 2017
- Number of buy-ins: 366
- Total Prize Pool: $1,775,100
- Number of Payouts: 71

Final table
Place	Name	Prize
1st	(United States) Kenneth Smaron	$293,860
2nd	(Canada) Harpreet Gill	$217,860
3rd	(Russia) Denis Timofeev	$161,340
4th	(Belgium) Jonathan Abdellatif	$119,480
5th	(Germany) Robin Wozniczek	$88,480
6th	(Canada) Anthony Diotte	$65,520
7th	(United States) James Salmon	$48,520
8th	(United States) Byron Kaverman	$35,920

=== Macau ===
- Venue: City of Dreams, Cotai, Macau
- Buy-in: HKD42,400
- 7-Day Event: April 1–9, 2017
- Number of buy-ins: 536
- Total Prize Pool: HKD20,796,800
- Number of Payouts: 103

Final table
Place	Name	Prize (HKD)
1st	(Canada) Elliot Smith	2,877,500*
2nd	(China) Tianyuan Tang	2,577,500*
3rd	(Australia) Daniel Laidlaw	1,724,000
4th	(Canada) Avraham Oziel	1,280,000
5th	(United Kingdom) Aymon Hata	950,000
6th	(Taiwan) Yen Chen	705,000
7th	(China) Yan Li	521,000
8th	(China) Xuan Tan	386,000

*Deal between the final two players.

=== (Monaco) Monte Carlo ===
- Venue: Monte-Carlo Bay Hotel & Resort, Monte Carlo, Monaco
- Buy-in: €5,300
- 7-Day Event: April 29–May 5, 2017
- Number of buy-ins: 727
- Total Prize Pool: €3,525,950
- Number of Payouts: 143

Final table
Place	Name	Prize
1st	(Italy) Raffaele Sorrentino	€466,714*
2nd	(Germany) Andreas Klatt	€402,786*
3rd	(Russia) Andrey Bondar	€271,500
4th	(Russia) Maxim Panyak	€199,900
5th	(France) Michael Kolkowicz	€147,120
6th	(Switzerland) Diego Zeiter	€108,300
7th	(Belgium) Davidi Kitai	€79,750
8th	(France) Romain Nardin	€58,740

*Deal between the final two players.

=== (Russia) Sochi ===
- Venue: Casino Sochi, Sochi, Russia
- Buy-in: RUB 318,000 ($5,590)
- 7-Day Event: May 25–31, 2017
- Number of buy-ins: 387
- Total Prize Pool: 150,000,000
- Number of Payouts: 55

Final table
Place	Name	Prize (RUB)
1st	(Russia) Pavel Shirshikov	29,100,000
2nd	(Russia) Vladimir Troyanovskiy	18,450,000
3rd	(Iran) Seyed Ghavam	13,335,000
4th	(Russia) Dmitry Vitkind	10,785,000
5th	(Kazakhstan) Lavrentiy Ni	8,535,000
6th	(Russia) Timur Bubnov	6,570,000
7th	(Kazakhstan) Daniyar Aubakirov	4,890,000
8th	(Russia) Nadar Kakhmazov	3,540,000

=== (Spain) Barcelona ===
- Venue: Casino Barcelona, Barcelona, Spain
- Buy-in: €5,300
- 7-Day Event: August 21–27, 2017
- Number of buy-ins: 1,682
- Total Prize Pool: €8,157,700
- Number of Payouts: 247

Final table
Place	Name	Prize
1st	(Sweden) Sebastian Sorensson	€987,043*
2nd	(Bulgaria) Lachezar Petkov	€917,347*
3rd	(Italy) Raffaele Sorrentino	€850,110*
4th	(Uruguay) Brian Kaufman	€402,000
5th	(Brazil) Andre Akkari	€317,960
6th	(United Kingdom) Usman Siddique	€252,000
7th	(United Kingdom) Aeragan Arunan	€193,000
8th	(Lebanon) Albert Daher	€136,000

*Deal between the final three players.

=== (Czech Republic) Prague ===
- Venue: Casino Atrium Prague, Prague, Czech Republic
- Buy-in: €5,300
- 7-Day Event: December 12-18, 2017
- Number of buy-ins: 855
- Total Prize Pool: €4,146,750
- Number of Payouts: 128

Final table
Place	Name	Prize
1st	(France) Kalidou Sow	€675,000*
2nd	(United States) Jason Wheeler	€570,000*
3rd	(Czech Republic) Michal Mrakes	€332,000
4th	(Italy) Gabriele Lepore	€249,000
5th	(United Kingdom) Harry Lodge	€196,000
6th	(United States) Colin Robinson	€147,000
7th	(Lithuania) Matas Cimbolas	€104,000
8th	(Ukraine) Valentyn Shabelnyk	€72,850

*Deal between the final two players.

== Future ==
On December 15, 2017, PokerStars announced that it will bring back regional tour brands in 2018. These include the EPT, Asia Pacific Poker Tour (APPT), and Latin American Poker Tour (LAPT). Therefore, the PokerStars Championship label will no longer be used.
