= Eugene Katchalov =

Ukrainian-born American poker player (born 1981)

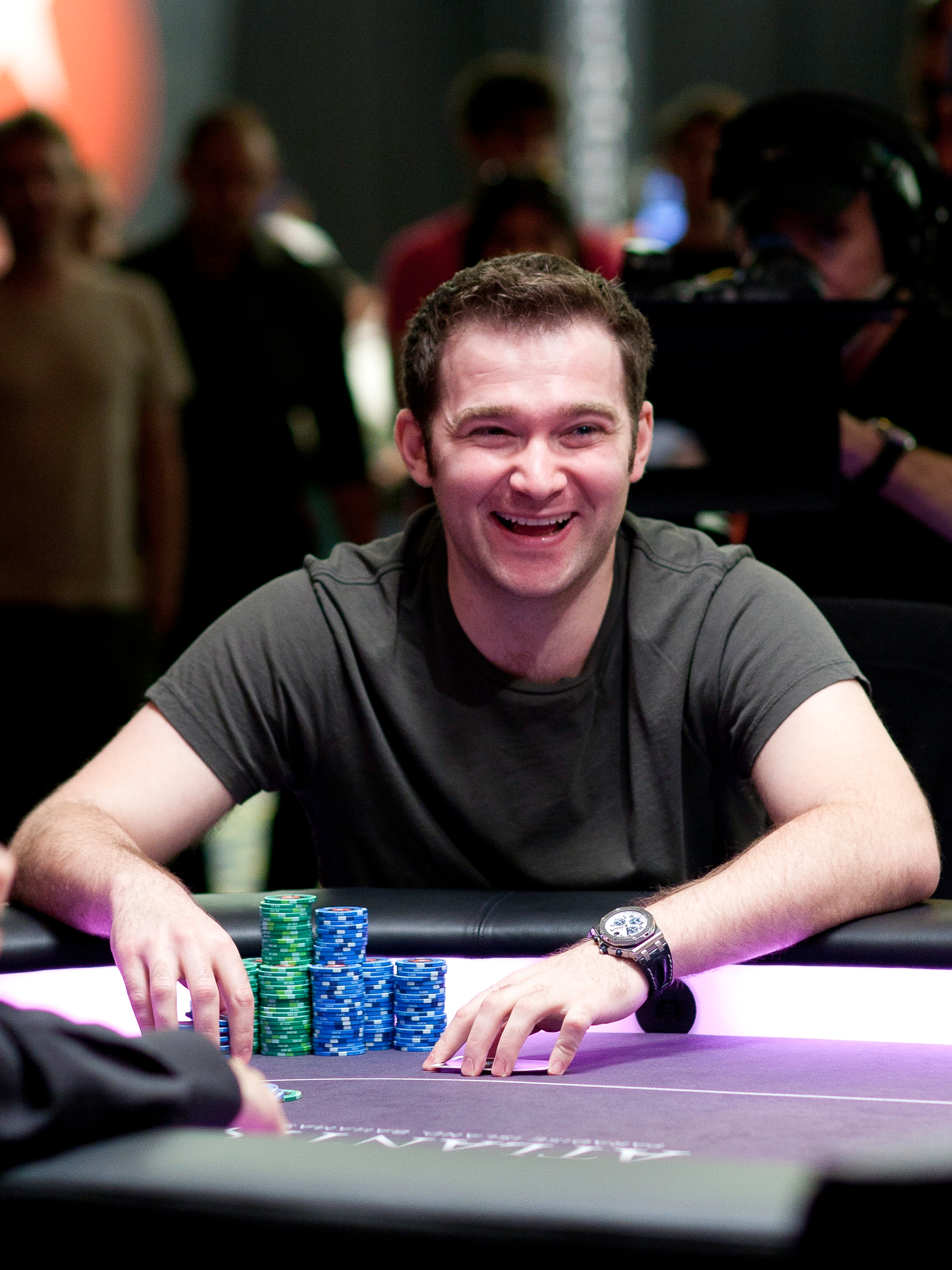
- Eugene Katchalov at the PCA Super High Roller 2011

World Series of Poker
- Bracelet: 1
- Money finishes: 30
- Highest WSOP Main Event finish: 39th, 2009

World Poker Tour
- Title: 1
- Final table: 1
- Money finishes: 9

European Poker Tour
- Title: None
- Final table: 3
- Money finishes: 9

Eugene Katchalov (born February 21, 1981, in Kyiv, Ukraine) is an American professional poker player raised in Brooklyn, New York, since age 10. He currently ranks #403 on the Global poker index, and has been ranked as high as number two. He is also 1st on the All-Time Money List in Ukraine.

Katchalov, a graduate with a business degree from NYU, is the winner of the largest payout for a non-championship event in the World Poker Tour (WPT), earning $2,482,605 with a win at the 2007 Doyle Brunson Five Diamond World Poker Classic.

In late 2016 Katchalov and poker player, and friend, Luca Pagano, entered the world of eSports with an Italian team: QLASH is the first professional team to attend the American spot of Dreamhack.

== Poker ==
Katchalov has been playing poker professionally since 2003; in March 2011 he joined Team PokerStars Pro and played under the screen name E.Katchalov. Katchalov was previously well known online under his former non-Team PokerStars Pro screen name MyRabbiFoo. After five years under the red spade brand, they parted away .

In addition to his 2007 WPT win, Katchalov finished 9th in the 2009 WPT Championship event. He has cashed nine times on the WPT Tour for a total of $2,759,761.

Katchalov has had 30 cashes in World Series of Poker events, including a bracelet win in the 2011 $1,500 Seven-Card Stud Tournament. He also finished 39th at the 2009 WSOP Main Event.

Katchalov has also succeeded on the European Poker Tour. He has cashed nine times in Main Events including third-place finishes in London, 2009, and Barcelona, 2011 and a second-place finish in Deauville, 2014. At the PokerStars Caribbean Adventure in 2011, Katchalov bested 37 other players in the $100,000 Super High Roller tournament, defeating Team Pokerstars Pro Daniel Negreanu heads-up, to win $1.5million. Ten days later, he came in 2nd place in the PCA $10,000 High Roller - 6 Max event winning $131,920 .

In June 2007, Katchalov won the Bellagio Cup III's $5,000 No-Limit Hold'em event.

As of May 2017, his total live tournament winnings exceed $8,900,000.

== World Series of Poker ==
In 2011 Katchalov conquered the prestigious bracelet in the $1,500 Seven-Card Stud event.

Date	City	Event	Position	Prize
June 10, 2005	(United States) Las Vegas	$2,000 No Limit Hold'em	74°	$3,870
June 22, 2005	(United States) Las Vegas	$1,500 No Limit Hold'em	48°	$6,530
June 28, 2007	(United States) Las Vegas	$5,000 No Limit Hold'em	32°	$13,344
June 6, 2008	(United States) Las Vegas	$5,000 No Limit Hold'em	10°	$16,920
June 13, 2008	(United States) Las Vegas	$1,500 Seven Card Razz	26°	$3,091
June 19, 2008	(United States) Las Vegas	$10,000 World Championship Omaha Hi/Lo Split	6°	$110,450
June 25, 2008	(United States) Las Vegas	$1,500 Seven Card Stud Hi/Lo	26°	$3,638
June 29, 2008	(United States) Las Vegas	$1,500 H.O.R.S.E.	71°	$2,630
June 5, 2009	(United States) Las Vegas	$2,500 Limit Hold'em Six Handed	25°	$5,360
June 8, 2009	(United States) Las Vegas	$2,500 No Limit Hold'em Six Handed	25°	$11,839
June 10, 2009	(United States) Las Vegas	$1,500 No Limit Hold'em Shootout	7°	$29,195
June 16, 2009	(United States) Las Vegas	$1,500 No Limit Hold'em	158°	$2,945
June 30, 2009	(United States) Las Vegas	$5,000 No Limit Hold'em Six Handed	15°	$137,378
July 3, 2009	(United States) Las Vegas	$10,000 World Championship No Limit Hold'em	39°	$178,857
June 1, 2010	(United States) Las Vegas	$5,000 No Limit Hold'em Shootout	21°	$16,607
June 12, 2010	(United States) Las Vegas	$10,000 Omaha Hi/Lo 8 Championship	7°	$74,670
June 23, 2010	(United States) Las Vegas	$10,000 H.O.R.S.E. Championship	3°	$248,831
June 1, 2010	(United States) Las Vegas	$2,500 No Limit Hold'em Six Handed	25°	$11,839
June 30, 2010	(United States) Las Vegas	$25,000 No Limit Hold'em Six Handed	6°	$194,559
June 2, 2011	(United States) Las Vegas	$1,500 Seven Card Stud	1°	$122,909
June 13, 2011	(United States) Las Vegas	$2,500 8 Game	36°	$5,740
June 24, 2011	(United States) Las Vegas	$1,500 Limit Hold'em - Shootout	4°	$50,993
June 3, 2012	(United States) Las Vegas	$5,000 Seven Card Stud (Event #10)	9°	$18,693
June 11, 2012	(United States) Las Vegas	$3,000 No Limit Hold'em - Six Handed (Event #23)	17°	$21,189
June 16, 2012	(United States) Las Vegas	$10,000 H.O.R.S.E. (Event #32)	17°	$16,246
July 3, 2012	(United States) Las Vegas	$10,000 No Limit Hold'em Six Handed (Event #57)	21°	$35,422
July 6, 2012	(United States) Las Vegas	$10,000 No Limit Hold'em National Championship	13°	$26,439
September 29, 2012	(France) Cannes	€10,450 No Limit Hold'em Main Event (Event #7)	40°	$27,724
June 5, 2013	(United States) Las Vegas	$5,000 Seven Card Stud Hi/Lo (Event #13)	22°	$9,583
June 9, 2013	(United States) Las Vegas	$15,000 Pot Limit Hold'em (Event #19)	5°	$58,912
May 14, 2014	(United States) Las Vegas	$1,500 No Limit Hold'em Shootout (Event #6)	67°	$4,411
May 29, 2015	(United States) Las Vegas	$565 No Limit Hold'em The Colossus (Event #5)	1008°	$3,009
June 3, 2015	(United States) Las Vegas	$1,500 No Limit Hold'em Six Handed (Event #12)	118°	$3,276
June 5, 2015	(United States) Las Vegas	$1,500 No Limit Hold'em Millionaire Maker (Event #16)	409°	$4,517
June 10, 2015	(United States) Las Vegas	$5,000 No Limit Hold'em Eight Handed (Event #25)	26°	$13,578
June 25, 2015	(United States) Las Vegas	$3,000 No Limit Hold'em Six Handed (Event #51)	86°	$6,150
June 28, 2016	(United States) Las Vegas	$1,500 Seven Card Stud (Event #49)	5°	$22,448
June 27, 2017	(United States) Las Vegas	$1,500 No Limit Hold'em (Event #52)	35°	$9,107
July 2, 2018	(United States) Las Vegas	$10,000 No Limit Hold'em Main Event (Event #65)	685°	$19,900

== World Series of Poker Europe (WSOPE) ==
Date	City	Event	Position	Prize
November 3, 2017	(Czech Republic) Rozvadov	€111,111 High Roller for One Drop (Event #10)	13°	€205,263

== World Poker Tour ==
Eugene Katchalov is active in the WPT field since 2004, a milestone reserved to few still active professional poker players.

Date	City	Event	Position	Prize
December 14, 2004	(United States) Las Vegas	Five-Diamond World Poker Classic $15,300	35°	$27,227
January 26, 2007	(United States) Atlantic City	Borgata Winter Open $10,000	45°	$14,954
December 12, 2007	(United States) Las Vegas	Doyle Brunson Five Diamond WPC $15,400	1°	$2,482,605
April 18, 2009	(United States) Las Vegas	Seventh Annual Five Star WPC $25,500	9°	$130,735
August 22, 2009	(United States) Los Angeles	Legends of Poker $10,100	14°	$26,160
February 26, 2010	(United States) Los Angeles	L.A. Poker Classic $10,000	62°	$23,600
December 3, 2010	(United States) Las Vegas	Doyle Brunson Five Diamond WPC $10,300	19°	$33,785
December 1, 2011	(Czech Republic) Prague	WPT Prague, €3,500 Main Event	27°	$8,529
April 10, 2012	(Austria) Wien	WPT Wien, €3,500 Main Event	19°	$12,282
March 1, 2014	(United States) Los Angeles	LA Poker Classic $10,000 Main Event	40°	$26,660

== European Poker Tour ==
The European Poker Tour (EPT) was one of the biggest itinerant tournament series hosted by PokerStars. EPT had its final season in 2016 when the PokerStars Championship succeeded.

Date	City	Event	Position	Prize
March 16, 2005	(Monaco) Monte Carlo	€10,000 Grand Final - No Limit Hold'em	18°	$21,030
September 30, 2009	(United Kingdom) London	£20,500 No Limit Hold'em High Roller	3°	$307,247
October 2, 2009	(United Kingdom) London	£5,250 No Limit Hold'em Main Event	77°	$14,646
January 8, 2010	(The Bahamas) Nassau	$5,250 Heads Up Challenge	5°	$17,600
January 6, 2011	(The Bahamas) Nassau	$100,500 No Limit Hold'em Super High Roller	1°	$1,500,000
January 8, 2011	(The Bahamas) Nassau	$10,300 No Limit Hold'em Main Event	74°	$28,000
January 16, 2011	(The Bahamas) Nassau	$10,200 No Limit Hold'em High Roller 6 Max	2°	$131,920
May 7, 2011	(Spain) Barcelona	€10,400 No Limit Hold'em EPT Grand Final	27°	$51,948
August 27, 2011	(Spain) Barcelona	€5,300 No Limit Hold'em Main Event	3°	$453,812
November 17, 2011	(Greece) Loutraki	€2,200 No Limit Hold'em	2°	$49,915
January 14, 2012	(The Bahamas) Nassau	$10,200 No Limit Hold'em 6 Max High Roller	7°	$25,320
March 12, 2012	(Spain) Barcelona	€2,150 No Limit Hold'em	12°	$6,795
March 17, 2012	(Spain) Barcelona	€5,200 No Limit Hold'em Six Max	4°	$12,069
March 31, 2012	(Italy) Campione	€5,200 No Limit Hold'em 6 Max Turbo	5°	$12,867
December 13, 2012	(Czech Republic) Prague	€10,300 No Limit Hold'em High Roller 8 Handed	12°	$32,677
March 16, 2013	(United Kingdom) London	£5,200 No Limit Hold'em Six Handed	7°	$7,524
October 8, 2012	(United Kingdom) London	£2,200 No Limit Hold'em	2°	$85,116
January 7, 2013	(The Bahamas) Nassau	$10,300 No Limit Hold'em (Event #5)	29°	$47,000
December 12, 2013	(Czech Republic) Prague	€5,300 No Limit Hold'em EPT Main Event	71°	$8,088
January 26, 2014	(France) Deauville	€5,300 No Limit Hold'em EPT Main Event	2°	$518,981
March 22, 2014	(Austria) Wien	€2,200 No Limit Hold'em Eureka High Roller	1°	$207,962
August 23, 2014	(Spain) Barcelona	#2,200 #23 No Limit Hold'em	30°	$6,899
October 12, 2014	(United Kingdom) London	£4,250 No Limit Hold'em (Event #16)	74°	$12,456
December 10, 2014	(Czech Republic) Prague	€2,200 No Limit Hold'em Eureka High Roller (Event #18)	3°	$126,723
December 11, 2014	(Czech Republic) Prague	€5,300 No Limit Hold'em (Event #22)	63°	$17,636
February 1, 2015	(France) Deauville	€5,300 No Limit Hold'em (Event #11)	86°	$9,936
February 7, 2015	(France) Deauville	€5,250 No Limit Hold'em Turbo Cash 6 Max (Event #42)	3°	$17,760
March 24, 2015	(Malta) Valletta	€2,200 #41 No Limit Hold'em	2°	$100,349
May 2, 2015	(Monaco) Monte Carlo	€10,600 No Limit Hold'em (Event #27)	64°	$23,452
December 8, 2015	(Czech Republic) Prague	€550 No Limit Hold'em Shootout (Event #18)	6°	$2,158
August 22, 2016	(Spain) Barcelona	€5,300 No Limit Hold'em (Event #24)	67°	$17,444
August 22, 2016	(Spain) Barcelona	€5,300 8 Game (Event #26)	2°	$30,791
August 26, 2016	(Spain) Barcelona	€10,300 No Limit Hold'em High Roller 8 Handed (Event #49)	103°	$13,188
October 23, 2016	(Malta) Valletta	€5,300 No Limit Hold'em (Event #33)	39°	$13,478
December 15, 2016	(Czech Republic) Prague	€2,200 No Limit Hold'em (Event #59)	1°	$133,905

== PokerStars Championship ==
Date	City	Event	Position	Prize
January 8, 2017	(The Bahamas) Nassau	€5,000 No Limit Hold'em (Event #23)	140°	$7,260

== PokerStars Festival ==
Date	City	Event	Position	Prize
March 8, 2017	(Czech Republic) Rozvadov	€5,300 No Limit Hold'em Kings High Roller (Event #19)	2°	$53,916

== Card Player Poker Tour ==
Date	City	Event	Position	Prize
July 17, 2017	(United States) Las Vegas	$5,000 Deepstack Extravaganza III (Event #103)	38°	$12,477

== eSports ==
Katchalov is a well-known sport enthusiast and in winter 2016 he joined long term friend and former PokerStars colleague Luca Pagano in the eSport adventure. He is co-owner of one of the first Italian professional competitive esport team: QLASH.
