= Steve O'Dwyer =

Irish poker player (born 1982)

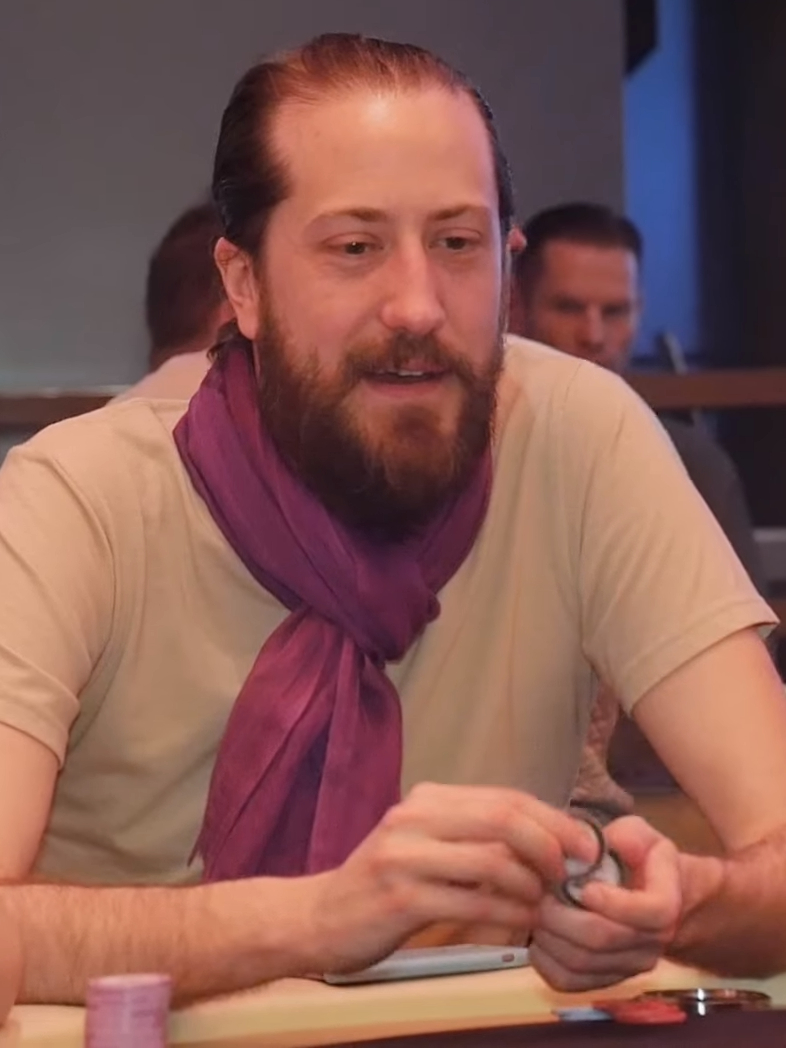
- Nickname: MrTimCaum
- Born: April 6, 1982 (age 44); Colorado Springs, Colorado

World Series of Poker
- Bracelet: None
- Final tables: 4
- Money finishes: 18
- Highest WSOP Main Event finish: 295th, 2007

World Poker Tour
- Title: None
- Final tables: 3
- Money finishes: 13

European Poker Tour
- Titles: 7
- Final tables: 54
- Money finishes: 92

Stephen O'Dwyer (born April 6, 1982) is an Irish-American professional poker player known for his accomplishments on the European Poker Tour, World Poker Tour, and high roller poker tournaments.

== Early life ==
O'Dwyer was born in 1982 in Colorado Springs, Colorado. He started playing poker after he saw Chris Moneymaker win the 2003 World Series of Poker. He graduated from East Carolina University in Greenville, North Carolina and worked in broadcasting.

== Poker career ==
O'Dwyer became hooked on poker after wandering into Thursday night $5 home games on campus.

He started playing online poker grinding freeroll tournaments and micro stakes in 2004, especially on Full Tilt.

O'Dwyer attended his first WSOP in 2007, cashing four times for $70,000.

In 2013, O'Dwyer won EPT Monte Carlo for $1,604,972.

O'Dwyer won the 2015 PokerStars Caribbean Adventure Super High Roller for $1,872,580 months after winning the 2014 Asia Championship of Poker Super High Roller for $1,811,828, his biggest score to date.

In January 2018, O'Dwyer won the PCA $50,000 High Roller for $769,500.

In May 2020, he won the SCOOP High Roller for $521,598.

As of June 2025, O'Dwyer's total live tournament winnings exceeded $46,700,000, over the course of 18 years, cashing in 273 different events.

O’Dwyer plays online under the screen name “Mr. Tim Caum” on PokerStars and “eet_smakelijk” on partypoker.

== Personal life ==
O'Dwyer was particularly affected by Black Friday and the shutdown of Full Tilt, to the point that he slept on Scott Seiver's floor during the 2011 World Series of Poker and borrowed money for food.

Steve O'Dwyer resides in Ireland. He is friends with pro poker players Isaac Haxton and Seiver.
