= Luca Pagano =

Italian poker player (born 1978)

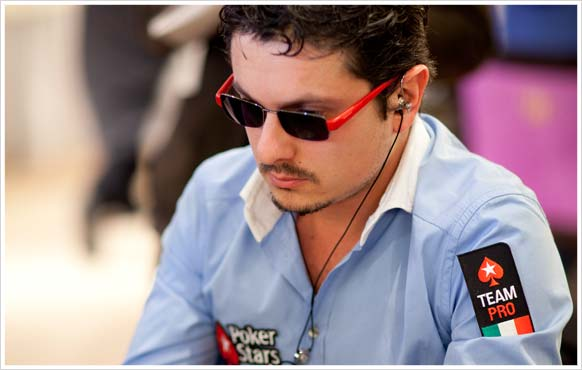
- Pagano in 2011
- Born: 28 July 1978 (age 48); Treviso, Italy

World Series of Poker
- Money finishes: 3
- Highest WSOP Main Event finish: 40°, 2006

European Poker Tour
- Final tables: 7
- Money finishes: 20

Luca Pagano (born 28 July 1978 in Treviso) is an Italian poker player who finished third place in the Barcelona Open, a European Poker Tour (EPT) event, in 2004. Since then he has reached six more EPT final tables, finishing in the money 20 times, placing him top of the EPT All-Time Leaderboard. He has also placed in two events at the 2006 World Series of Poker.

He was a Team PokerStar PRO member for almost 15 years and, as of 2017, his total live tournament winnings exceed $2,200,000.

== Biography ==
Pagano attended the information-science branch at the Ca' Foscari University of Venice; quickly his managerial skills took over and the nightlife family-run business was profitably administrated. The big love for poker comes a little later, during a trip in Slovenia where he played a game in the Casino of Nova Gorica.

He has been a professional poker player since 2004, the year he achieved a third-place finish at the European Poker Tour (EPT) Barcelona Open. His subsequent career trajectory saw him competing in major international tournaments across prominent global cities, leading to his appointment as the primary Italian representative for Team PokerStars Pro. In May 2017, Pagano and PokerStars reached a mutual agreement to conclude their professional partnership.

Pagano recorded multiple tournament finishes and accumulated a substantial bankroll. He also achieved a high number of in-the-money placements in Italian poker.

Together with poker, Pagano is an entrepreneur, Angel Investor, TV commentator and host, main host of the Italian talent and reality show La Casa degli Assi, sponsored by PokerStars and co-owner of Italian professional eSports Team QLASH.

== European Poker Tour ==
In the European Poker Tour, Pagano gained 20 ITM placements with 7 Final Tables. Despite the strong perseverance, he never scored any first place; his best EPT result is third place in Barcelona in 2004.

On 11 September 2008, Pagano was awarded by the European Poker Tour Awards as "The Player of the Year".

Pagano holds the first position in the EPT All-Time Leaderboard with 5.500 points, right before French player Bertrand "ElkY" Grospellier, and holds the second position in the EPT ITM Rank Score - he is the first, however, among Italians; the Global Poker Index has estimated his winnings in about $2,212,339.

Date	City	Event	Position	Prize
18 September 2004	(Spain) Barcelona	EPT Barcelona €1,000 Main Event	3°	$24,500
16 February 2005	(France) Deauville	EPT Deauville €2,000 Main Event	8°	$17,492
10 March 2005	(Poland) Warsaw	EPT Vienna €2,000 Main Event	14°	€5,750
16 September 2005	(Spain) Barcelona	EPT Barcelona €1,000 Main Event	24°	€7,800
19 January 2006	(Denmark) Copenhagen	EPT Copenhagen DKr 30,000 Main Event	24°	DKr 47,776
26 October 2006	(Republic of Ireland) Dublin	EPT Dublin €5,000 Main Event	13°	$25,563
30 October 2007	(Republic of Ireland) Dublin	EPT Dublin €7,700 Main Event	24°	€10,210
19 February 2008	(Denmark) Copenhagen	EPT Copenhagen DKr 47,750 Main Event	27°	DKr 84,346
12 April 2008	(Monaco) Monte Carlo	EPT €10,000 Monte Carlo Grand Final	6°	$533,253
10 March 2009	(Germany) Dortmund	EPT Dortmund €5,000 Main Event	6°	$198,900
28 April 2009	(Monaco) Monte Carlo	EPT Monte Carlo €10,000 Main Event	55°	€31,000
20 October 2009	(Poland) Warsaw	EPT Warsaw PLN 25,000 Main Event	4°	$128,930
1 December 2009	(Czech Republic) Prague	EPT Praga €5,000 Main Event	6°	€100,000
11 January 2010	(The Bahamas) Paradise Island	EPT PCA World Cup of Poker NLH	6°	$2,000
20 January 2010	(France) Deauville	EPT Deauville €5,000 Main Event	72°	€10,900
1 May 2010	(Slovenia) Nova Gorica	All Stars of Poker €5,000 NLH	1°	€220,000
11 August 2010	(Estonia) Tallinn	EPT Tallinn €4,000 Main Event	26°	€8,000
28 August 2010	(Portugal) Vilamoura	EPT Vilamoura €5,000 Main Event	52°	€7,263
13 December 2010	(Czech Republic) Prague	EPT Praga €5,000 Main Event	43°	€10,000
20 March 2011	(Austria) Hinterglemm	EPT Snowfest €3,500 Main Event	50°	€6,000
7 January 2012	(The Bahamas) Paradise Island	EPT PCA $10,000 Main Event	30°	$46,000
31 January 2012	(France) Deauville	EPT Deauville €5,000 Main Event	7°	€110,000
10 October 2013	(United Kingdom) London	EPT UKIPT £10,000+300 NL High Roller	7°	£60,930
14 February 2016	(Republic of Ireland) Dublin	EPT €50,000+300 Main Event	17°	€25,820
12 December 2016	CZ Prague	EPT €2,000+200 Eureka high Roller	83°	€4,825

== Italian Poker Tour ==
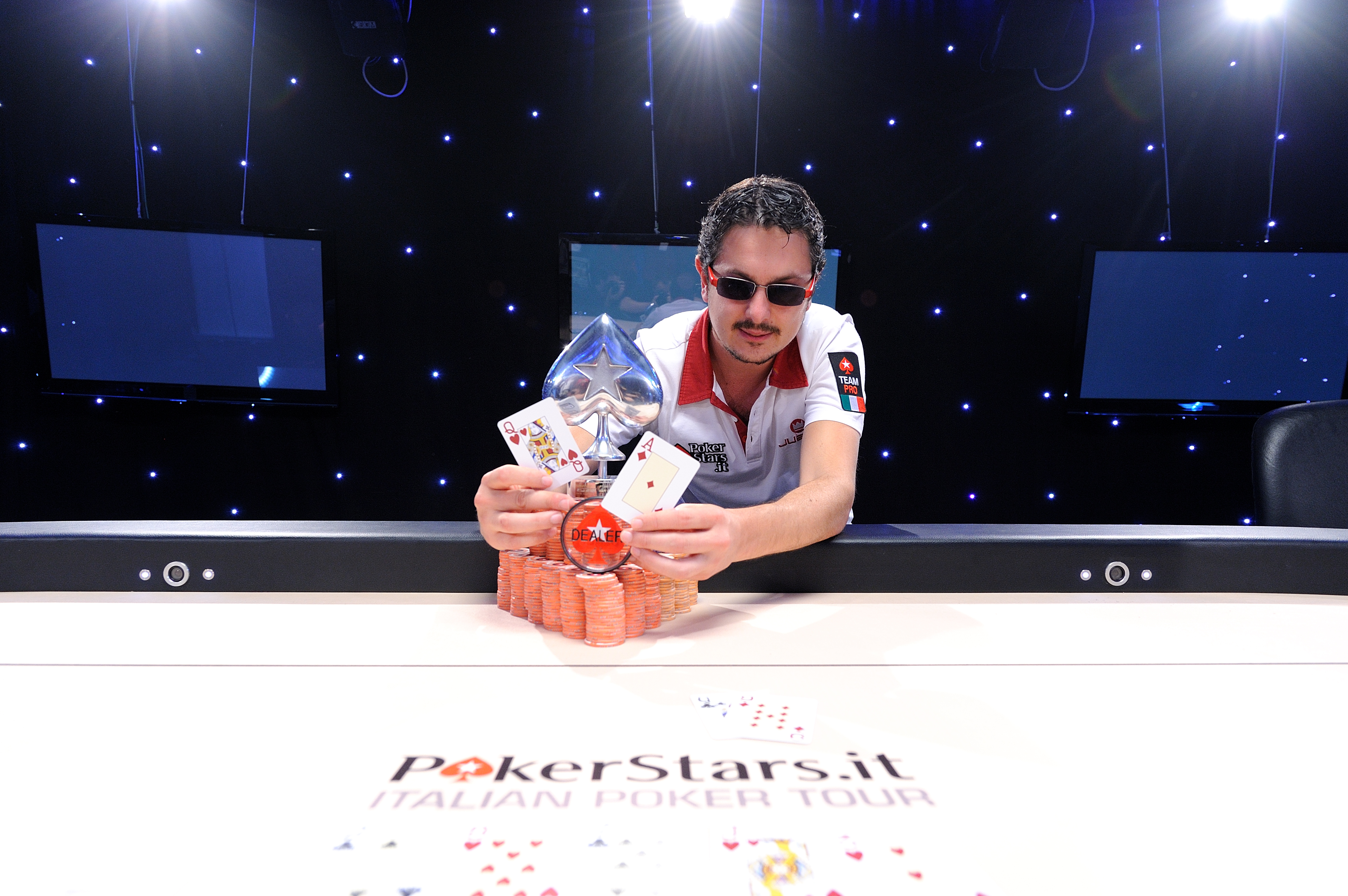
Luca Pagano, IPT Sanremo 2011

On 1 August 2011 wins for the first time the Italian Poker Tour Sanremo step, gaining a trophy and €210,000 of prize.

As May 2017, at the time of the split from PokerStars, he holds the 8th place in the "All Time Money List" of HendonMob, for a global earnings of $2,212,339.

Date	City	Event	Position	Prize
23 September 2010	(Slovenia) Nova Gorica	IPT Nova Gorica €2,000 Main Event	12°	€8,200
28 July 2011	(Italy) Sanremo	IPT Sanremo €2,000 Main Event	1°	€210,000
29 April 2013	(Italy) Sanremo	IPT Sanremo €5,000 Main Event	4°	€8,000
30 November 2014	(Italy) Sanremo	IPT Sanremo Grand Final €900 Main Event	20°	€2,400
21 October 2015	Malta	IPT Malta €1,000 Main Event	87°	€2,210
15 May 2016	(Italy) Saint-Vincent	IPT St-Vincent €1,000 Main Event	9°	€5,500

== Pokerstars Festival ==
PokerStars Festival since 2017 replaces the Italian Poker Tour format.

Data	City	Event	Position	Prize
28 January 2017	(United Kingdom) London	PokerStars Festival £990 Main Event	104°	£1,690

== World Series of Poker ==
Pagano's best placement in the World Series of Poker was in 2006, in the $1.500 Seven Card Stud event, where he finished in 40th place.

Data	City	Event	Position	Prize
28 June 2005	(United States) Las Vegas	WSOP $2,000 Main Event	56°	$3,945
5 July 2006	(United States) Las Vegas	WSOP $1,500 7 Card Stud Main Event	40°	$2,610
18 June 2008	(United States) Las Vegas	WSOP $1,500 Main Event	149°	$3,340

== Poker related activities ==
Pagano co-hosted, together with sport commentator Giacomo Valenti, the famous TV show "Poker1Mania", aired, from 2007 to 2013, late night on Italian public television; the show was the first of its kind featuring the professional game of poker in a less technical language and earned a big audience consensus.

Pagano organizes poker events by the Venice Casino, by the detached branch Ca' Noghera, by the Casino Sanremo, Casino Saint-Vincent, Aosta Valley and Nova Gorica.

In mid 2014, Pagano hosted the first edition of talent and reality show La Casa degli Assi, original format by PokerStars produced by Magnolia Italy; this reality was aired for the first time on a terrestrial satellite TV channel and secondly re-aired on the public television, at night.

In March 2015, Pagano hosted the second edition of the talent show, aired late night on public television.

== eSports ==
In 2016, Pagano co-founded the Italian professional esports organization QLASH alongside poker player Eugene Katchalov.

QLASH won the Best Italian Team award at the Italian Esports Awards in both 2020 and 2021, and in November 2020 entered a partnership with AC Milan to form AC Milan QLASH.

== Bibliography ==
- Pagano, Luca (2010). Dal Texas Hold'em a Las Vegas: il poker e altre storie. Italy: Gremese. ISBN 978-88-8440-631-6.
- Pagano, Luca (2011). Giocare a Texas Hold'em e poker americano. Italy: De Vecchi. ISBN 978-88-412-0383-5.
