= Kitty Kuo =

Taiwanese poker player (born 1983)

- 郭慧貞
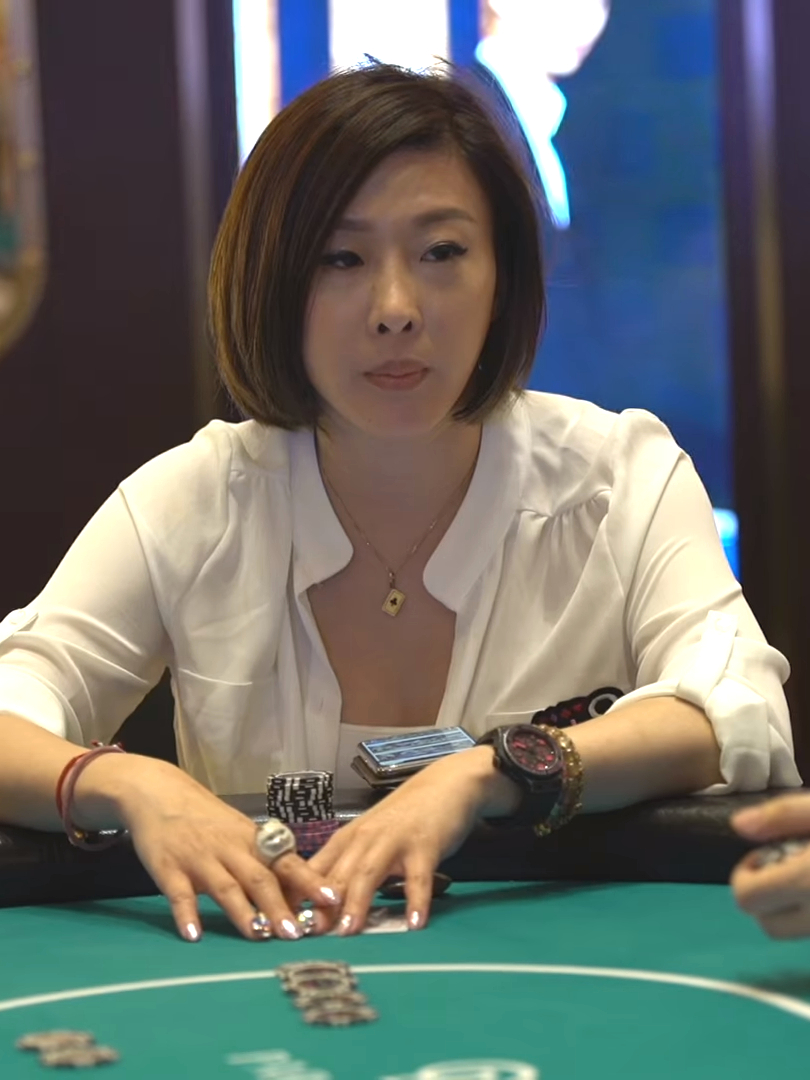
- Born: August 31, 1983 (age 43); Taipei, Taiwan
- Education: University of Southern California
- Occupation: Poker Player
- Years active: 2007 - Present
- Nickname: Kitty

World Series of Poker
- Bracelet: None
- Final table: 1
- Money finishes: 29

World Poker Tour
- Title: None
- Final tables: 4
- Money finishes: 12

European Poker Tour
- Title: None
- Final table: None
- Money finishes: 12

Chinese name
- Simplified Chinese: 郭慧贞
- Traditional Chinese: 郭慧貞
Transcriptions
Standard Mandarin
- Hanyu Pinyin: guō huì zhēn

Kitty Kuo (simplified Chinese: 郭慧贞; traditional Chinese: 郭慧貞; pinyin: Guō Huìzhēn; born August 31, 1983) is a Taiwanese professional poker player. She currently resides in Las Vegas and is widely regarded as one of Asia’s top female poker pros. Throughout her career Kuo has amassed over US$3.6 million in live tournament earnings.

== Early life ==
Kitty Kuo was born Hui‑Chen Kuo in Taipei, Taiwan. She grew up in a traditional Taiwanese household and showed an early aptitude for mathematics and logic. Kuo pursued studies in electrical engineering and later attended the University of Southern California, where she was first introduced to competitive gaming, including blackjack and poker. Her analytical mindset and competitive nature led her to explore poker seriously after graduation.

== Poker career ==
Kitty Kuo launched her live poker career with a notable cash in 2007 at the APPT Macau, quickly establishing herself with a victory in the 2009 PokerStars Macau Poker Cup Main Event (~US $71,900).

Over the next decade, she accumulated more than US $3.4 million in live tournament earnings, making deep runs in major series—including the WSOP, WPT, EPT, Aussie Millions—and earning six-figure scores at events like the 2014 Hollywood Poker Open (3rd, US $142,158), 2016 Aussie Millions (6th, A$270,000), and 2018 WPT Tournament of Champions (2nd, US $248,380).

She captured the APT Taiwan Main Event title in 2021 and secured her career-best cash of US $480,763 with a 4th-place finish at the 2023 Seminole Hard Rock Poker Open.

== Personal life ==
Kitty Kuo was previously married to poker pro Russell Thomas, divorced in 2022, and is currently in a relationship and has a child with poker player Frankie Cucchiara.
