= Ryan Daut =

American poker player (born 1984)

- Nicknames: El Dauto, Beano, Jerry Bean, EZ Pass, No Doubt-Daut
- Born: April 18, 1984 (age 42)

World Series of Poker
- Money finishes: 4

World Poker Tour
- Title: 1
- Final tables: 3
- Money finishes: 3

Ryan Daut (born April 18, 1984) is an American poker player from New Jersey. After earning a degree in mathematics and computer science from the University of Richmond in 2006, Daut began work on a doctorate in mathematics at Penn State University. He dropped out of the program after one semester to play poker professionally.

Ryan Daut started out in competitive gaming with StarCraft and StarCraft: Brood War.

On January 10, 2007, Daut won a World Poker Tour event at the PokerStars Caribbean Poker Adventure. He defeated Isaac Haxton heads up and won $1,535,255 for first place.

As of 2010, his total live tournament winnings exceeded $1,800,000.
