= Jeff Williams (poker player) =

American poker player (born 1986)

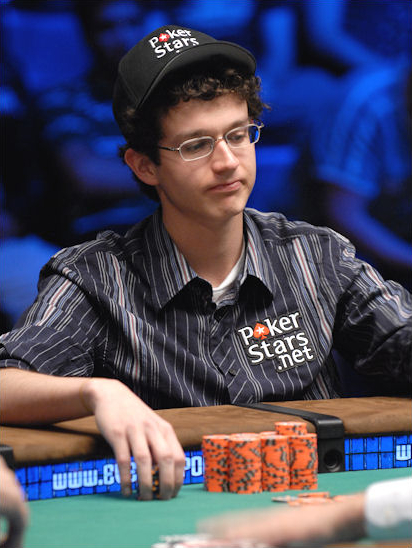
- Jeff Williams during the World Series of Poker
- Nickname: yellowsub86
- Born: July 14, 1986 (age 40)

World Series of Poker
- Bracelet: None
- Money finishes: 10
- Highest WSOP Main Event finish: None

European Poker Tour
- Title: 1
- Final table: 1
- Money finishes: 2

Jeff Williams (born July 14, 1986) is an American poker player from Dunwoody, Georgia. He graduated from Dunwoody High and the University of Georgia.

In March 2006, Williams won the European Poker Tour (EPT) second season Monte Carlo Grand Final where he won €900,000 (US$1,084,037). Jeff was only 19 at the time of his victory. Jeff qualified for the tournament at PokerStars where he plays under the name "yellowsub86".

In the 2008 World Series of Poker Williams finished second in the $1,000 No Limit Hold'em rebuy for $406,330.

As of 2011, his total live tournament winnings exceed $1,900,000.

== Top Winnings ==
Event	Place	Winning	Year
41st WSOP, Las Vegas (No Limit Hold'em)	3rd	$328,762	2010
39th WSOP, Las Vegas (No Limit Hold'em)	2nd	$406,330	2008
Sixth Annual Five Star World Poker Classic - WPT World Championship, Las Vegas	4th	$34,205	2008
EPT Grand Final, Monte Carlo	1st	$1,084,037	2006
