= Rupert Elder =

English poker player

- Nicknames: ElRupert, TheMothEater, COFFEEMAN, Mr. MarkUp

World Series of Poker
- Bracelet: None
- Money finishes: 7
- Highest WSOP Main Event finish: 132nd, 2011

World Poker Tour
- Title: None
- Final table: None
- Money finish: 1

European Poker Tour
- Title: 1
- Final table: 1
- Money finishes: 5

Rupert Elder is an English professional poker player. He turned professional in 2009, after graduating from Warwick University with a degree in Economics. He holds a European Poker Tour title and an Aussie Millions ring. He is also known by his PokerStars screenname, ElRupert. His total tournament winnings, both live and online, exceed $3,000,000.

== Online poker ==
Elder has several notable online tournament victories. In October 2010, he came runner-up in the Full Tilt Poker Million-Dollar Guarantee for $142,846. In April 2012 he took fifth place in the PokerStars Sunday Million for $59,770. According to PocketFives.com, an online tournament player ranking site, Elder has amassed over $1.1 million in online tournament earnings.

== European Poker Tour ==
In May 2011, Elder won the European Poker Tour in San Remo for €930,000 ($1,225,647), defeating German professional Max Heinzelmann heads-up. In April 2013, Elder won the €1,100 turbo event at the EPT Berlin for €49,800.

== World Series of Poker ==
In September 2011, he was featured heavily in the ESPN coverage of the World Series of Poker main event, where he eventually finished in 132nd position for $54,851. He also took 18th in the $2500 six-handed event at the WSOP for $25,769.

== Aussie Millions ==
In January 2013, Elder won the inaugural event at the Aussie Millions for 250,000 AUD ($263,925), defeating a field of 1338 players.

As of 2013, his live tournament winnings exceed $1.9 million.

== Twitch streaming ==
Rupert was once the most popular poker player on the streaming site Twitch, at one point holding the largest ever live streamed tournament win of $124,000, at one point holding the largest ever live streamed tournament win. Elder is however most famous for once eating a moth live on stream.
