= David Pomroy =

English poker player (born 1983)

- Nickname: Pommo

European Poker Tour
- Title: None
- Final table: 1
- Money finish: 1

David Pomroy (born 23 June 1983) is a professional poker player from London, England.

After originally making a name for himself in high-stakes online cash games, Pomroy finished 3rd in the 2005 European Poker Tour Dublin event. Pomroy is sponsored by Virgin Poker and has contributed articles to various poker magazines, most notably Poker Player Magazine. In May 2006 he was featured in Company Magazine's 50 Most Eligible Bachelors.

== EPT ==
He did a notable cash in the second EPT season, finishing 3rd for more than $100,000.

As of January 2008, his live tournament winnings exceed $100,000.
