= Isabelle Mercier =

Canadian poker player (born 1975)

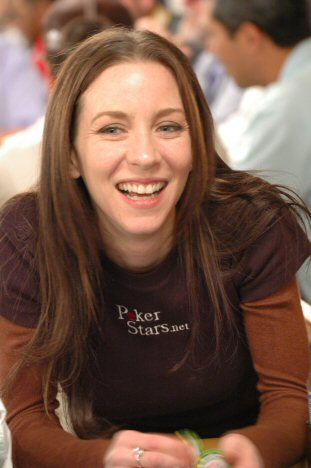
- Isabelle Mercier at the 2005 World Series of Poker
- Nickname: No Mercy
- Born: August 5, 1975 (age 51); Victoriaville, Quebec

World Series of Poker
- Bracelet: None
- Money finishes: 7
- Highest WSOP Main Event finish: None

World Poker Tour
- Title: None
- Final table: None
- Money finishes: 4

European Poker Tour
- Title: None
- Final table: 1
- Money finishes: 5

Isabelle Mercier (born August 5, 1975, in Victoriaville, Quebec) is a professional poker player.

Mercier originally learned to play poker as a child, but prior to turning to a poker career, she earned an undergraduate law degree from the Université de Montréal and practiced commercial law for six months. She then moved to Paris, France and earned a master's degree while working as the poker room manager at the Aviation Club de France, before turning to poker full-time. During her time working at the Aviation Club she was nominated for Staff Person of the Year twice at the European Poker Awards.

She first made a name for herself by finishing in second place in the €800 No Limit hold 'em tournament at the Masters Classic of Poker 2002 in Amsterdam, where she earned $53,499.

In 2004 Mercier won the World Poker Tour (WPT) Ladies' Night tournament and the $25,000 first prize, where Mike Sexton nicknamed her "No Mercy."

In 2005, she finished tenth in the European Poker Tour (EPT) Grand Final in Monte Carlo, earning €23,090. Also in 2005, she had three money finishes at the WSOP. Mercier made her first EPT final table in February 2006 in Deauville, finishing seventh at a final table also featuring fellow professionals Ram Vaswani and Kirill Gerasimov.

Mercier has her own instructional DVD and appeared in the documentary That's Poker. In January 2008, she released her own biography: Profession : bluffeuse (Profession: Bluffer), in Montreal and printed in France by Flammarion.

On April 27, 2009, Mercier won the PokerStars' Ante Up for Africa charity tournament in Monte Carlo. The final table included fellow Canadian Daniel Negreanu, Lithuanian Tony G, John Duthie (creator of the European Poker Tour), Italian pro Dario Minieri (who finished third), and English soccer star Teddy Sheringham (who came in second).

On July 12, 2009, Mercier finished 3rd in the PokerStars Sunday Millions, cashing for $115,000.

Until 2009, she was a member of the PokerStars online poker cardroom's "Team PokerStars" group of sponsored players. By the end of 2009, Mercier left the PokerStars pro team and on December 2, 2009, joined gambling giant BetClic as a consultant for their online poker site.

Mercier won the very first World Championship of Open Face Chinese Poker in Prague in 2015.

Since 2017, Isabelle Mercier is an ambassador for cryptocurrency poker site CoinPoker. She regularly plays tournaments and OFC on the platform, and has a dedicated weekly tournament with a bounty to win.

Mercier's total live tournament winnings exceeded $1,200,000 as of 2015.
