= David Vamplew =

Scottish poker player (born 1987)

- Born: 1987 (age 38–39); Kirkcaldy, Scotland

World Series of Poker
- Bracelet: None
- Money finishes: 15
- Highest WSOP Main Event finish: 268, 2011

European Poker Tour
- Title: 1
- Final tables: 10
- Money finishes: 34

David Vamplew is a Scottish poker player, born in Kirkcaldy, who became known after winning the EPT-UKIPT Main Event, 2010 in London. He currently lives in Edinburgh, Scotland.

== Early years ==
Vamplew had a job delivering newspapers and worked as a lifeguard when at Inverkeithing High School. He worked in a supermarket when in university. At the same time he was playing and studying poker and decided to make his living by the game. In 2009 Vamplew graduated with a maths degree and gave poker a serious shot.

== Poker career ==
David Vamplew is considered one of the most successful poker players in the UK. He began his career with a WSOP tournament. Then he won the EPT Season 7 London "No Limit Hold'em - Main Event", for more than $1,400,000. He primarily plays higher buy-in international tournaments, as well as smaller local UK events on occasion.

=== EPT ===
Vamplew has 1 EPT Main Event title, plus more than 30 money finishes in other EPT events. He won the 2010 EPT Main event at the age of 23, having only one other cash prior. After battling a field of 848 poker players, he defeated John Juanda in a five-hour final heads-up duel. After winning it Vamplew said about Juanda: "He got really unlucky, that's it.". The prize money from the EPT title took Vamplew to the number one spot on the Scottish all-time money list.

=== WSOP ===
In 2011 he played in the 42nd World Series of Poker Main Event and he finished at 268th position for $40,654. In 2013 Vamplew placed second in two different WSOP tournaments, just short of the bracelet.

=== WPT ===
The year after his success in London, Vamplew finished 3rd in a WPT Venice Main Event for $201,855.

As of 2018, Vamplew has live tournament winnings exceeding $3,800,000.

== Personal life ==
Vamplew now works for Seamless Capital, an algorithmic trading firm based in Cambridge, UK.
