= PokerStars Caribbean Adventure =

Annual poker tournament

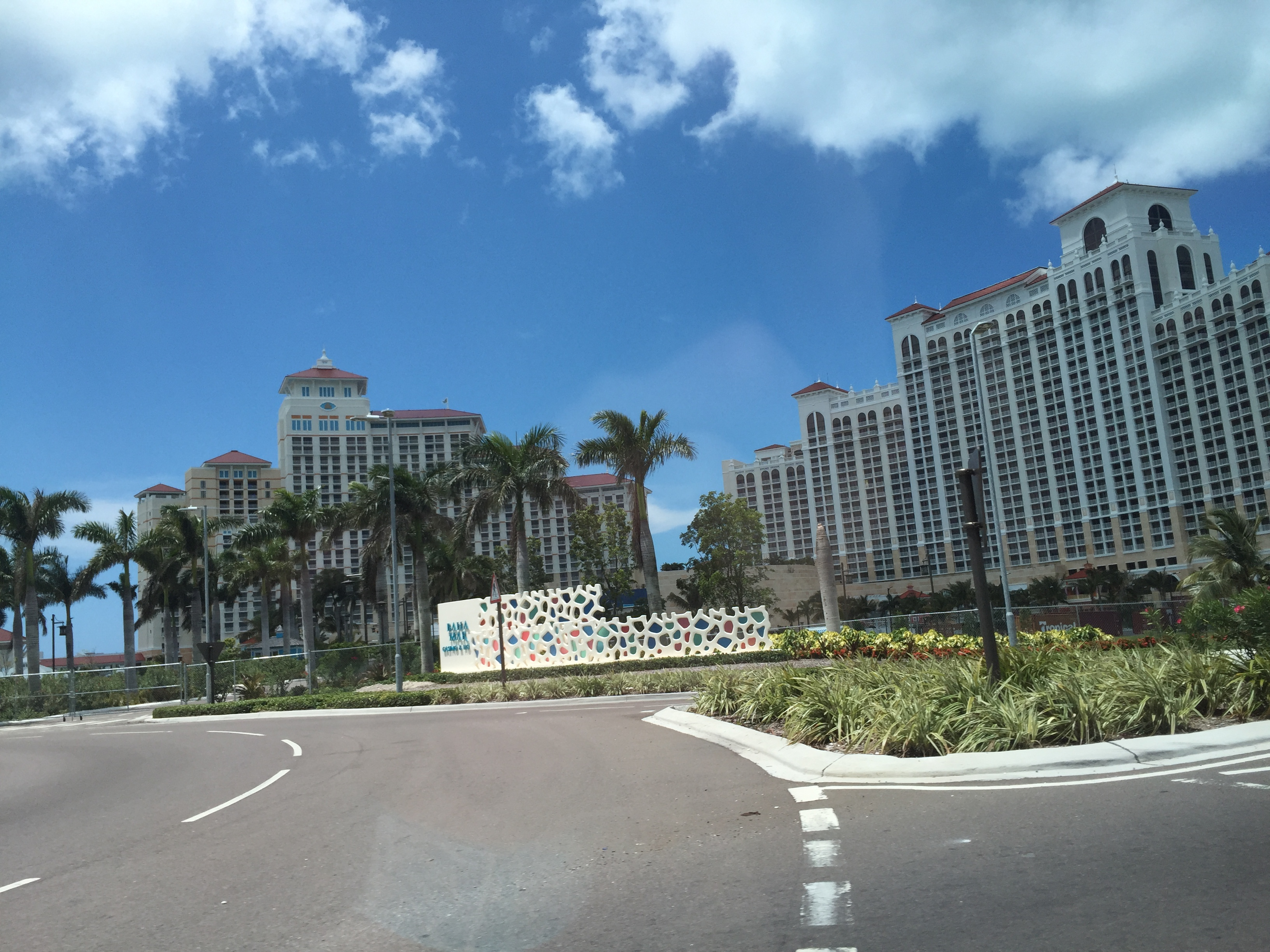
PCA and PSPC 2023 was held at Baha Mar

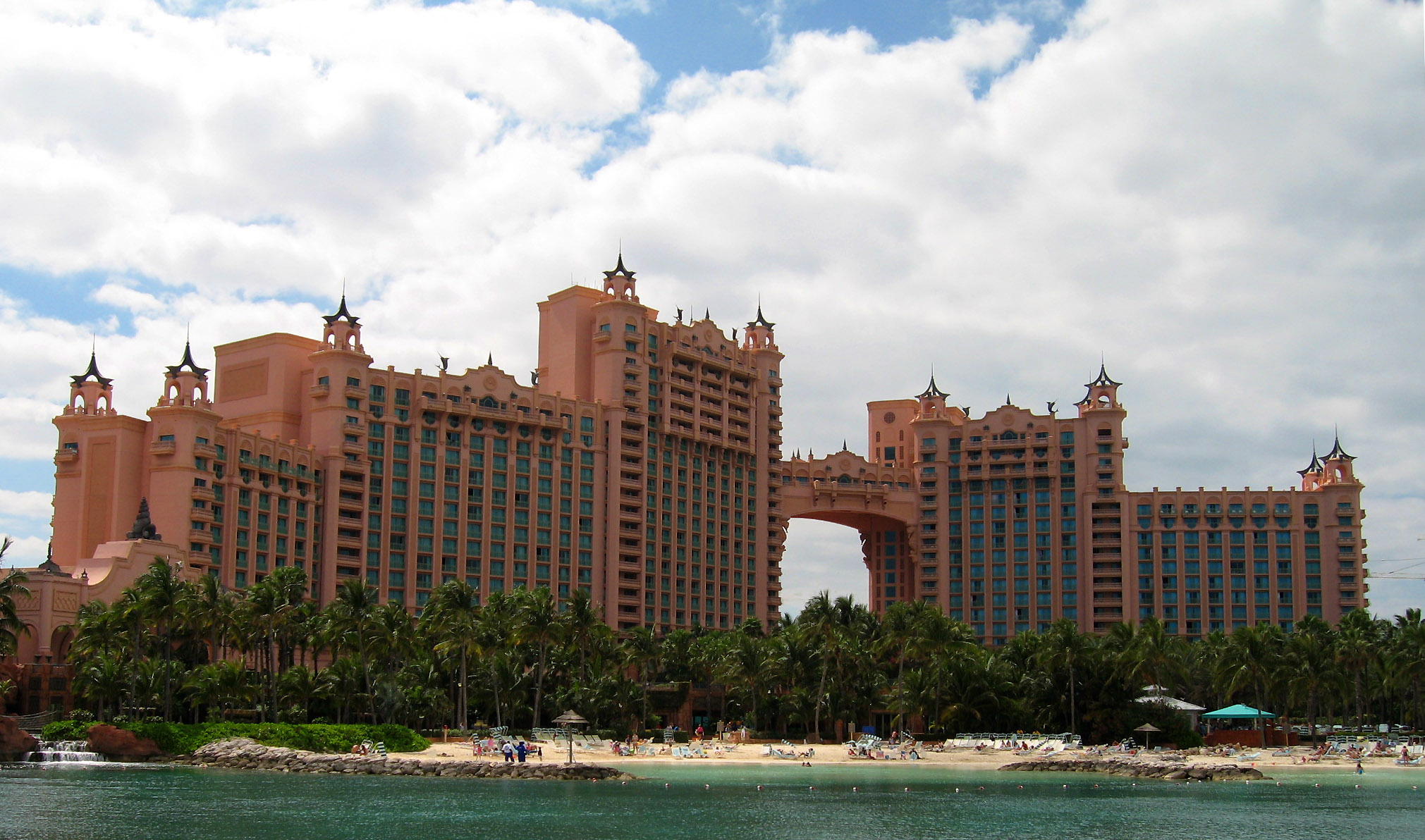
2005-2019, the event has been held at the Atlantis Casino and Resort on Atlantis Paradise Island

2004, the event has been held at Royal Caribbean Voyager of the Seas cruise ship

The PokerStars Caribbean Adventure is an annual televised poker tournament.

== History ==
The event was first held in 2004 and was originally co-sponsored by PokerStars and the World Poker Tour. In 2008, the event moved from the WPT to the European Poker Tour. In 2010, the event was moved again and served as the inaugural event of the North American Poker Tour. In 2017 the tournament was the inaugural event of the new PokerStars Championship tour and renamed PokerStars Championship Bahamas. The name was changed back to the PCA for 2018 and the buy-in restored to $10,000.

In 2004, the event took place on the Royal Caribbean Voyager of the Seas cruise ship. For 15 years (from 2005 to 2019), the event took place at the Atlantis Paradise Island and after a three-year break, it returns to the Bahamas at the brand new Baha Mar Resort.

The 2011 PCA commenced on January 4, 2011. Over fifty events took place over ten days, including the main event with an estimated prize pool of $20 million. Players either buy into the main event directly for $10,300, or they may win their way into the event via satellites running on PokerStars and at the event. The main event final table was aired live on ESPN2, featuring commentary by James Hartigan and Daniel Negreanu.

John Dibella, a 43-year-old stock trader from New York, won the 2012 PCA for $1,775,000. Dibella won a live $1,000 satellite into the $10,000 Main Event and is the first amateur player to win the tournament.

In 2019, PokerStars announced that the PCA would be discontinued in 2020.

In April 2022, PokerStars announces the return of the PCA and PSPC to the Bahamas in 2023 at a new location the Baha Mar Resort.

== Main event winners ==
Year	Buy-in	Winner	Prize	Entries	Total prize pool	Results
2004	$7,500	(Denmark) Gus Hansen	$455,780	221	$1,657,500	
2005	$8,000	(United Kingdom) John Gale	$890,600	461	$3,487,200	
2006	$7,800	(Canada) Steve Paul-Ambrose	$1,388,600	724	$5,647,200	
2007	$8,000	(United States) Ryan Daut	$1,535,255	937	$7,063,842	
2008	$8,000	(France) Bertrand Grospellier	$2,000,000	1,136	$8,562,976	
2009	$10,000	(Canada) Poorya Nazari	$3,000,000	1,347	$12,674,000	
2010	$10,300	(United States) Harrison Gimbel	$2,200,000	1,529	$14,831,300	
2011	$10,300	(United States) Galen Hall	$2,300,000	1,560	$15,132,000	
2012	$10,300	(United States) John Dibella	$1,775,000	1,072	$10,398,400	
2013	$10,300	(Bulgaria) Dimitar Danchev	$1,859,000	987	$9,573,900	
2014	$10,300	(Poland) Dominik Pańka	$1,423,096	1,031	$10,070,000	
2015	$10,300	(United States) Kevin Schulz	$1,491,580	816	$7,915,200	
2016	$5,300	(Canada) Mike Watson	$728,325	928	$4,500,800	
2017	$5,000	(United States) Christian Harder	$429,664	738	$3,376,712	
2018	$10,300	(Argentina) Maria Lampropulos	$1,081,100	582	$5,645,400	
2019	$10,300	(United States) David Rheem	$1,567,100	865	$8,390,500	
2023	$10,300	(Portugal) Michel Dattani	$1,183,037	889	$8,623,300	

== High Roller winners ==
Year	Buy-in	Winner	Prize	Entries	Total prize pool	Results
2009	$25,000	(France) Bertrand Grospellier	$433,500	48	$1,200,000	
2010	$25,500	(United States) William Reynolds	$576,240	84	$2,058,000	
2011	$25,500	(Canada) Will Molson	$1,072,850	151	$3,775,500	
2011	$10,200	(Russia) Alexander Kostritsyn	$263,840	68	$659,600	
2012	$25,500	(Russia) Alex Bilokur	$1,134,930	141 + (7 Rebuys)	$3,626,000	
2012	$10,200	(Canada) Shawn Buchanan	$202,360	87	$843,900	
2013	$25,500	(United States) Vanessa Selbst	$1,424,420	161 + (43 Rebuys)	$4,998,000	
2014	$25,000	(United States) Jake Schindler	$1,279,880	198 + (49 Rebuys)	$6,051,500	
2015	$25,000	(Azerbaijan) Ilkin Garibli	$1,105,040	200 + (69 Rebuys)	$6,456,000	
2016	$50,000	(United States) Steve O'Dwyer	$945,495	80	$3,860,000	
2016	$25,000	(United States) Nicholas Maimone	$996,480	173 + (52 Rebuys)	$5,400,000	
2017	$25,750	(Canada) Luc Greenwood	$779,268	121 + (38 Rebuys)	$3,895,500	
2018	$50,000	(United States) Steve O'Dwyer	$769,500	46	$2,263,200	
2018	$25,000	(Canada) Christopher Kruk	$836,350	144	$3,484,800	
2019	$25,000	(United States) Martin Zamani	$895,110	115 + (47 Rebuys)	$3,849,930	
2023	$25,000	(United States) Dylan Smith	$364,440	32 + (12 Rebuys)	$1,056,440	
2023	$25,000	(Bulgaria) Ognyan Dimov	$990,655	187	$4,444,055	

== Super High Roller winners ==
Year	Buy-in	Winner	Prize	Entries	Total prize pool	Results
2011	$100,500	(Ukraine) Eugene Katchalov	$1,500,000	38	$3,743,000	
2012	$100,000	(Sweden) Viktor Blom	$1,254,400	30 + (2 Rebuys)	$3,136,000	
2013	$100,000	(United States) Scott Seiver	$2,003,480	43 + (12 Rebuys)	$5,724,180	
2014	$100,000	(Germany) Fabian Quoss	$1,629,940	46 + (10 Rebuys)	$5,433,120	
2015	$100,000	(Republic of Ireland) Steve O'Dwyer	$1,872,580	50 + (16 Rebuys)	$6,402,000	
2016	$100,000	(United States) Bryn Kenney	$1,687,800	44 + (14 Rebuys)	$5,626,000	
2017	$100,000	(United States) Jason Koon	$1,650,300	41 + (13 Rebuys)	$5,239,080	
2018	$100,000	(United States) Cary Katz	$1,492,340	36 + (12 Rebuys)	$4,737,600	
2019	$100,000	(Canada) Sam Greenwood	$1,775,460	43 + (18 Rebuys)	$5,918,220	
2023	$100,000	(United States) Isaac Haxton	$1,082,230	40 + (9 Rebuys)	$4,753,980	
2023	$250,000	(Canada) Sam Greenwood	$3,276,760	30 + (9 Rebuys)	$9,498,060	
