= Anton Vamplew =

British astronomer (born 1966)

- Born: Rainham, Kent, England
- Occupations: Astronomer; presenter; writer; author
- Years active: 1986–present
- Known for: Astronomer on Blue Peter
- Children: 2, Morten and Etie

Anton Vamplew (born 6 February 1966, in Rainham, Kent) is an English amateur astronomer, author, lecturer and media presenter of the subject.

== Biography ==
He joined Mid-Kent Astronomical Society in 1979, later becoming chairman and editor of the society's quarterly journal, Pegasus.

His first radio appearance was on BBC Radio Kent in 1986 during the approach of Halley's Comet. On the same station, he soon created his astro-persona "Captain Cosmos", presenting a monthly live phone-in. This was followed by an astronomy series entitled the Essential Guide to the Night Sky, which ran for eight months.

From March 1993 to July 2002 he toured schools, colleges and museums, giving talks about space and astronomy to children and adults in the Astrodome inflatable mobile planetarium. He was also involved in writing the shows.

In November 1996 he was asked to write and present a Universe Special for the BBC World Service youth programme, Megamix. He then became a regular presenter of the programme (along with Nikita Gulhane and Brenda Emmanus) until it ended in March 1999. During that time he produced a series of features entitled the Captain Cosmos Guide to the End of the World.

Also on the World Service, he wrote and presented a 10-part astronomy series: Captain Cosmos' Galactic Guide which was broadcast twice in 1998, plus he was the resident astronomy expert from March 1999 to March 2000 on the youth programme, The Edge.

On 5 November 1997, he made his first of 30 regular appearances on the BBC Children's programme, Blue Peter. For a time he became known as the Blue Peter Astronomer and undertook two overseas assignments to the telescopes of La Palma and Hawaii.

In 1999 Vamplew joined the Royal Observatory Greenwich working as a presenter in their original Caird Planetarium. Once the redevelopment of the Observatory site began in late 2004 he joined the team that would equip the new, then to be named, Peter Harrison Planetarium. He left his newer role of Planetarium Producer and the Observatory itself in May 2007.

He wrote the Beginners' Guide in the BBC Sky at Night magazine from February 2006 until May 2013.

== Selected television appearances ==
- GMTV (TV) (2006) (ITV morning news programme)
- Mind Games (TV) (2004) (BBC4 brainteaser quiz panel show)
- Richard & Judy (TV) (2004) (Channel 4 chat show)
- Ready, Steady, Cook (TV) (2002) (BBC2 cookery show)
- This Morning (TV) (2005) (ITV daytime magazine show)
- BBC World (TV) (2006) (BBC international news channel)
- Who Knows? (TV) (2003) (Disney Channel magazine show)
- Space Detectives (TV) (2000) (BBC children's 13-part programme - scientific advisor and episode writer)

== Bibliography ==
- Simple Stargazing (Collins, 2005), ISBN 0-00-720395-0
- Anton Vamplew's Stargazing Secrets (Collins, 2007), ISBN 0-00-724224-7
- Secretos Para Observar Los Astros (Naturart, S.a.), ISBN 978-84807 6795 8
- The Practical Astronomer (Dorling Kindersley, 2010), ISBN 978-1-4053-5620-6
- Stargazing for Beginners (Dorling Kindersley, 2010), ISBN 978-14053-6195-8
- Praktische Astronomie: Das Handbuch zur Himmelsbeobachtung (Dorling Kindersley Verlag, 2011), ISBN 978-38310-1824-6
- New Simple Stargazing (iTunes, 2012), ISBN 978-16220-9075-4
- Anton's Night Sky Guide 2013 (Amazon, 2012), ASIN B008PR9XMG
- The Practical Astronomer, 2nd Edition (Dorling Kindersley, 2017), ISBN 978-14654-4513-1
- Stargazing for Beginners, 2nd Edition (Dorling Kindersely, 2020), ISBN 978-02414-4059-9
