= Glen Chorny =

Canadian poker player

- Nickname: Dr C

World Series of Poker
- Bracelet: None
- Money finish: 1
- Highest WSOP Main Event finish: None

World Poker Tour
- Title: None
- Final table: None
- Money finish: 1

European Poker Tour
- Title: 1
- Final table: 1
- Money finishes: 2

Glen Chorny is a Canadian poker player from Waterloo, Ontario. He has studied at Wilfrid Laurier University and has been playing professionally since January 2008. Chorny's first European Poker Tour (EPT) cash came at the PokerStars Caribbean Poker Adventure in January 2008 when he finished in 13th place. In April, he won the EPT Season 4 Grand Final in Monte Carlo, and by doing so he won the biggest cash prize ever in Europe at €2,020,000 ($3,198,500). As of February 2010, his total live tournament winnings exceeded $3,500,000.

== Poker career ==
Chorny qualified for the 2008 European Poker Tour (EPT) Grand Final through PokerStars "Steps" satellite tournaments, which had a $700 starting buy-in. He was a 22-year-old business student from Ontario at the time.

=== 2008 PokerStars Caribbean Adventure ===
In January 2008, Chorny finished 13th in the EPT main event at the PokerStars Caribbean Adventure, which drew 1,136 entrants, for a prize of $80,000.

=== 2008 EPT Grand Final ===
In April 2008, Chorny won the €10,000 buy-in EPT Grand Final main event in Monte Carlo, defeating a record field of 842 players. He entered the final table as chip leader and held the lead for most of the day. He eliminated American Isaac Baron when his pocket aces held against Baron's ace-queen, and went into heads-up play against Hungary's Denes Kalo with roughly a 10-to-1 chip advantage. The heads-up match lasted two hands. The heads-up match lasted two hands.

Chorny received a first prize of €2,020,000 (about US$3.2 million), the largest payout in European poker history at that time. Kalo took €1,179,000 for second place.

=== Later results ===
As of October 2026, Card Player credits Chorny with total recorded tournament earnings of $3,556,370 from 23 cashes, with the 2008 EPT Grand Final accounting for most of that amount.

== Business dispute ==
In June 2016, Card Player, citing a report in The Indianapolis Star, reported that Chorny had filed a lawsuit in Indiana against poker player and former Indianapolis restaurateur Philippe Rouas. The suit alleges that Chorny was misled about the status of a poker-themed social network venture, Poker World Society, in which he says he invested $3.7 million in 2008. Attorneys for both parties declined to comment at the time.
