= Jan Boubli =

French poker player

- Nickname: Le Grand

World Series of Poker
- Bracelet: None
- Money finishes: 2
- Highest WSOP Main Event finish: None

World Poker Tour
- Title: None
- Final table: 1
- Money finish: 1

European Poker Tour
- Title: 1
- Final table: 1
- Money finish: 1

Jan "Le Grand" Boubli (born 13 November) is a French professional poker player from Paris.

Jan Boubli was a dentist for 22 years before retiring.

In July 2003 he finished second at the World Poker Tour (WPT) second season Grand Prix de Paris.

In September 2005 he won the European Poker Tour (EPT) second season Barcelona Open. He defeated Christer Johansson heads-up to win €426,000 ($528,195).

As of 2008, his total live tournament winnings exceed $1,200,000.
