= Steve Paul-Ambrose =

Canadian poker player (born 1983)

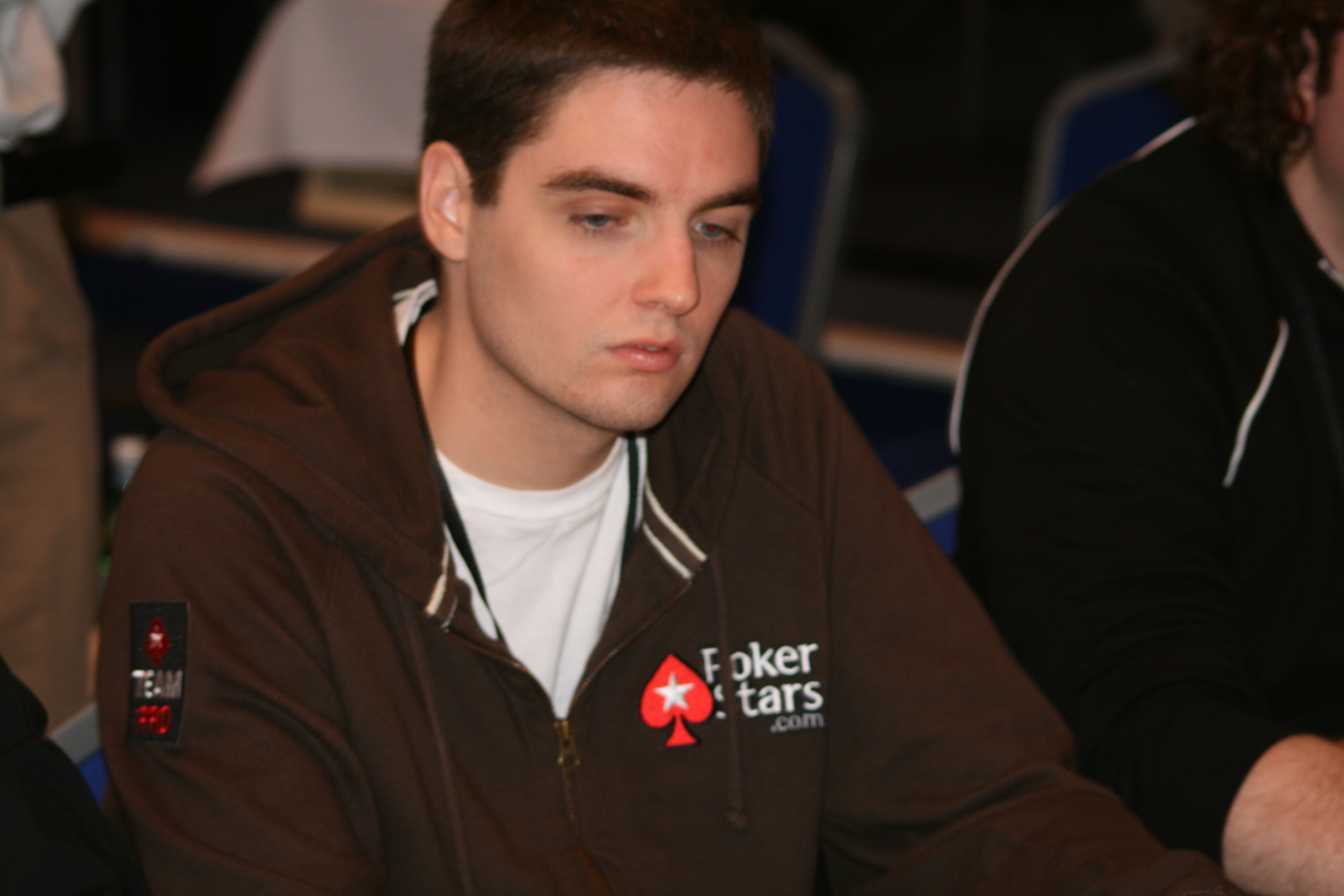
- Paul-Ambrose at the EPT Monte Carlo Grand Final
- Born: 1983 (age 42–43)

World Series of Poker
- Money finishes: 5

World Poker Tour
- Title: 1
- Final table: 1
- Money finishes: 4

Steve Paul-Ambrose (born 1983) is a poker player from Ontario, Canada who won the 2006 PokerStars Caribbean Poker Adventure (PCA), earning $1,388,600. At the time a World Poker Tour event, he won his PCA entry through an online $102 satellite tournament on PokerStars.

Paul-Ambrose is a 2007 graduate from the University of Waterloo, in Waterloo, Ontario, Canada, where he studied business and science.

== World Series of Poker ==
Paul-Ambrose's best finish to date at the WSOP is in the $5,000 World Championship Mixed Hold'em (Limit/No-Limit) event where he came in fourth, earning $146,259, with a final table made up of such notables as Jon Turner, Kirk Morrison (poker player), the runner-up Greg Mueller, and Steve Billirakis the winner.

As of 2010, his total live tournament winnings exceed $1,900,000.

== See also ==
- List of University of Waterloo people
