= Poorya Nazari =

Canadian poker player (born 1986)

- Nicknames: Nazar, Heavy P
- Born: July 1, 1986 (age 40)

Poorya "Nazar" Nazari (born July 1, 1986) is a professional poker player residing in Richmond Hill, Ontario. He is the 2009 PokerStars Caribbean Adventure champion winning $3,000,000 for his finish, which is the largest prize in PCA history.

In November 2013, Nazari won the PokerStars Sunday 2nd Chance a second time for $47,257 playing under his alias, "isuckoutonu".

As of 2023, Nazari's live tournament winnings exceed $3,200,000.
