= Christian Harder =

American poker player

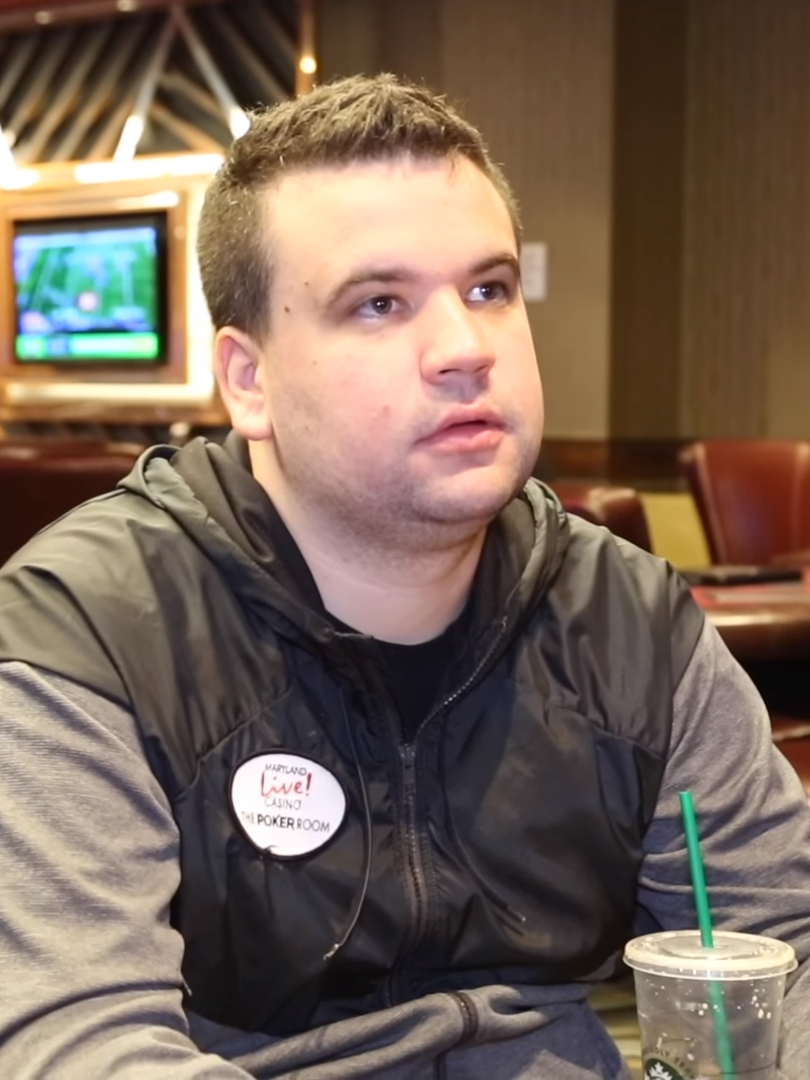
- Christian Harder in 2018
- Nicknames: charder30 (Full Tilt & PokerStars)

World Series of Poker
- Bracelet: None
- Final tables: 2
- Money finishes: 50
- Highest WSOP Main Event finish: 92nd, 2011

World Poker Tour
- Title: None
- Final tables: 3
- Money finishes: 17

European Poker Tour
- Title: None
- Final tables: 2
- Money finishes: 3

Christian Harder is an American professional poker player who along with Chris Bjorin has second most consecutive cashes in the World Series of Poker Main Event at four times (2010–2013) behind Ronnie Bardah. He has earned a World Championship of Online Poker championship. He is a Card Player Poker Pro. In 2009, he was ranked as the number one tournament player in the world.

== Background ==
Early in Harder's poker career, he was staked by other poker players. In September 2009, Harder ranked as the number one tournament poker player in the world when combining online and live play. Card Player Poker Pro Harder, has several live game championships, but his biggest live game payout was $571,965 for a 4th-place finish in the 2009 338-entrant $25,000 World Poker Tour World Championship at Bellagio, where he held the chip lead with 10 players remaining.

== World Series of Poker ==
Harder was a final tablist at the $3,000 Pot Limit Omaha 2011 World Series of Poker Event 31 where he finished 4th. In 2013, he and Ronnie Bardah tied Chris Björin's 2-year-old record for most consecutive World Series of Poker Main Event cashes (4).

World Series of Poker results
Year	Cashes	Final Tables	Bracelets
2009	2	0	0
2009 E	1	0	0
2010	7	0	0
2011	4	1	0
2012	3	0	0
2013	4	0	0
2014	4	0	0
2015	6	1	0
2016	6	0	0
2017	4	0	0
2018	8	0	0

== Online ==
With over $1.5 million in online earnings, Harder has several notable online tournament victories to his credit. Harder holds a World Championship of Online Poker bracelet from the September 17, 2008 $200 + $15 Pot-limit Omaha hold 'em with Rebuys Event 25. He is a four-time winner of the PokerStars Daily $100 With Rebuys, having won $46,512 in the 637-entrant January 17, 2010, event, $44,585 in the 584-entrant August 15, 2009, event, $33,990 in the 269-entrant March 8, 2008, event, and $32,802 in the 461-entrant September 18, 2009, event. Among his other notable online victories are the September 17, 2007, 323-entrant $1,000 + $60 Full Tilt Poker $1K Monday No-limit Hold'em event for $80,750, the September 9, 2009, 893-entrant $300 + $20 PokerStars Wednesday Quarter Million No-limit Hold'em event for $48,490, and the June 5, 2008, 753-entrant $150 + $12 PokerStars Nightly Hundred Grand No-limit Hold'em. Harder's largest online payout was for an 11th-place finish in the WCOOP 2008 2185-entrant $5,000 + $200 Main Event when he won $87,400.

World Championship of Online Poker bracelets
Year	Tournament	Prize (US$)
2008	$200 + $15 Pot-limit Omaha hold 'em with Rebuys	$23,220
