= European Poker Tour =

Poker tournament in Europe

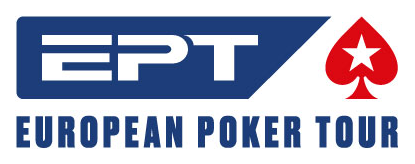
- Sport: Texas Hold 'em
- Founded: 2004 by John Duthie
- CEO: 2004-2012 John Duthie; 2012-2017 Edgar Stuchly; 2017-2018 David Carrion; 2018-now Cédric Billot
- Continent: Europe
- Most recent champions: (Russia) Roman Stoica; EPT Monte Carlo (May/2026)
- Most titles: (United Kingdom) Victoria Coren (2) (Belarus) Mikalai Pobal (2) (Canada) Mike Watson (2) (Sweden) Anton "WhatIfGod" Bergstrom (2)
- Broadcaster: Sunset + Vine
- Website: europeanpokertour.com Flutter Entertainment plc www.starsgroup.com

Old logo used prior to 2018

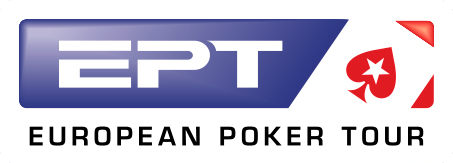
Old logo used from 2018 to 2021

The European Poker Tour (EPT) is a series of poker tournaments created by John Duthie, winner of the inaugural Poker Million tournament. It began in 2004 as part of the worldwide explosion in Texas Hold 'em popularity. Since 2011 the EPT has been sponsored and wholly owned and controlled by PokerStars the online casino and taped by Sunset + Vine for television broadcast across Europe. By season 4 the buy-in for most EPT events was increased to €8,000 (due to increased popularity and lack of space in participating casinos). At 2007 exchange rates, this is approximately equal to the US$10,000 which is the buy-in for most major poker events.

This single move made the EPT the largest poker tour in the world, eclipsing its nearest rivals significantly. The WSOP was larger, but was only run in Las Vegas.

The final table like most other major poker events is made up of 8 players.

For the first couple of seasons, John Duthie commentated for the show alongside Colin Murray. Since the middle of Season 3, James Hartigan has been the lead commentator, with professional players Greg Raymer, Daniel Negreanu and Victoria Coren Mitchell providing analysis. Hartigan also presents the live webcast from each event. The TV show was first hosted by Caroline Flack, then joined by Natalie Pinkham. Seasons 4 and 5 were hosted by Kara Scott, while Seasons 6 and 7 were fronted by Michelle Orpe. Since Season 8, there have been four different presenters with Kristy Arnett, Sarah Grant, Laura Cornelius and Lynn Gilmartin, with commentators James Hartigan and Joe Stapleton presenting the TV shows.

== 2010 EPT Berlin robbery ==
On 6 March 2010 four masked men, armed with knives and at least one hand gun robbed the EPT event in Berlin. According to the police, the robbers got away with €242,000. No one was seriously injured, only one guard got a minor cut while trying to detain one of the robbers. The panic which gripped the crowd was briefly captured on the live webcast before the camera cut away. The attackers were caught several days after the robbery and later convicted and sentenced to three years in prison.

== 2017 rebranding ==
In 2017, the series was discontinued and rebranded as the PokerStars Championship. However, this only lasted one year and the EPT returned in 2018.

== 2020 EPT Online ==
In 2020, three scheduled stops on the EPT (in Monte Carlo, Barcelona and Prague) were cancelled due to the COVID-19 pandemic – a fourth event (in Sochi) continued as planned.

An inaugural EPT Online series took place on sponsor site PokerStars instead, running from 8–18 November 2020. The series comprised 20 tournaments, including a $5,200 Main Event, four $10,300 High Roller events, and a $25,000 Super High Roller. The Main Event, which had a $5 million guaranteed prize pool, attracted 1,304 entries. The final prize pool came to $6.52 million, of which $1,019,082 went to the eventual winner "WhatIfGod", with Timothy Adams finishing as runner-up.

== Return to Paris (2026) ==
In 2026, EPT Paris returned to Le Palais des Congrès from 18 February to 1 March, marking the event's comeback after the 2025 edition was cancelled due to regulatory challenges.

The previous EPT Paris (in 2024) saw Barny Boatman become the oldest European Poker Tour Main Event winner, defeating a field of 1,661 entries to claim the €1,287,800 first prize.

The 12-day EPT festival, operated by Club Barrière Paris in partnership with PokerStars, featured 86 events including a €5,300 Main Event with single re-entry format - with Jorge Abreu of Portugal beating German poker-pro Felix Schneiders heads-up to win first prize of €1,148,600.

== EPT Monte Carlo (2026) ==
The 2026 EPT Monte Carlo ran from 30 April to 10 May at the Casino de Monte-Carlo. The festival drew 9,182 entries from 1,839 unique players across 46 events, with a total prize pool of €46,645,848. Roman Stoica of Russia won the €5,300 Main Event for €825,000, defeating a 1,011-entry field; Bernhard Binder of Austria finished second for €515,000. The €250,000 EPT Super High Roller, new for 2026, drew 38 entries for a €9,310,000 prize pool and was won by Alex Kulev of Bulgaria for €2,786,332. Albert Daher of Lebanon won the €100,000 High Roller for One Drop for €2,055,000, and Joris Ruijs of the Netherlands won the PokerStars Open Main Event for €317,398.

== EPT Main Event winners ==
PokerStars Championship (PSC) Main Event winner (2017).
PokerStars Caribbean Adventure Main Event winner.
Winner of poker's Triple Crown.

Season	Date	Event and location	Main event winner	Prize
1	18–19 September 2004	(Spain) EPT Barcelona Open	(Sweden) Alexander Stevic	€80,000
1	9–10 October 2004	(United Kingdom) EPT London	(United Kingdom) John Shipley	£200,000
1	23–24 October 2004	(Republic of Ireland) EPT Dublin	(United Kingdom) Ram Vaswani	€93,000
1	29–30 January 2005	(Denmark) EPT Scandinavian Open, Copenhagen	(Netherlands) Noah Boeken	DKr1,098,340
1	15–19 February 2005	(France) EPT French Open, Deauville	(United States) Brandon Schaefer	€144,000
1	10–11 March 2005	(Austria) EPT Vienna	(France) Pascal Perrault	€184,500
1	15–19 March 2005	(Monaco) EPT Grand Final, Monte Carlo	(Netherlands) Rob Hollink	€635,000
2	16–17 September 2005	(Spain) EPT Barcelona Open	(France) Jan Boubli	€426,000
2	30 September–2 October 2005	(United Kingdom) EPT London	(United Kingdom) Mark Teltscher	€280,000
2	4–6 October 2005	(Austria) EPT Baden Classic	(Finland) Patrik Antonius	€288,180
2	29–30 October 2005	(Republic of Ireland) EPT Dublin	(Sweden) Mats Gavatin	€317,000
2	19–22 January 2006	(Denmark) EPT Scandinavian Open, Copenhagen	(Denmark) Mads Andersen	DKr2,548,040
2	8–11 February 2006	(France) EPT French Open, Deauville	(Sweden) Mats Iremark	€480,000
2	7–11 March 2006	(Monaco) EPT Grand Final, Monte Carlo	(United States) Jeff Williams	€900,000
3	13–16 September 2006	(Spain) EPT Barcelona Open	(Norway) Bjørn-Erik Glenne	€691,000
3	21–24 September 2006	(United Kingdom) EPT London	(United Kingdom) Victoria Coren	£500,000
3	7–10 October 2006	(Austria) EPT Baden Classic	(Germany) Duc Thang Nguyen	€487,397
3	16–29 October 2006	(Republic of Ireland) EPT Dublin	(United Kingdom) Roland De Wolfe	€554,300
3	17–20 January 2007	(Denmark) EPT Scandinavian Open, Copenhagen	(Sweden) Magnus Petersson	DKr4,078,080
3	8–11 March 2007	(Germany) EPT German Open, Dortmund	(Norway) Andreas Høivold	€672,000
3	14–17 March 2007	(Poland) EPT Warsaw Open	(Denmark) Peter Jepsen	zł1,226,711
3	28 March–2 April 2007	(Monaco) EPT Grand Final, Monte Carlo	(United States) Gavin Griffin	€1,825,010
4	28 August–1 September 2007	(Spain) EPT Barcelona Open	(Denmark) Sander Lylloff	€1,170,700
4	25–29 September 2007	(United Kingdom) EPT London	(Lebanon) Joseph Mouawad	£611,520
4	7–10 October 2007	(Austria) EPT Baden Classic	(United Kingdom) Julian Thew	€670,800
4	30 October–3 November 2007	(Republic of Ireland) EPT Dublin	(United States) Reuben Peters	€532,620
4	10–14 December 2007	(Czech Republic) EPT Prague	(France) Arnaud Mattern	€708,400
4	5–10 January 2008	(The Bahamas) PokerStars Caribbean Adventure, Paradise Island	(France) Bertrand Grospellier	$2,000,000
4	29 January–2 February 2008	(Germany) EPT German Open, Dortmund	(Canada) Mike McDonald	€933,600
4	19–23 February 2008	(Denmark) EPT Scandinavian Open, Copenhagen	(United States) Tim Vance	DKr6,220,488
4	11–15 March 2008	(Poland) EPT Warsaw Open	(Germany) Michael Schulze	zł2,153,999
4	1–5 April 2008	(Italy) EPT Sanremo	(United States) Jason Mercier	€869,000
4	12–17 April 2008	(Monaco) EPT Grand Final, Monte Carlo	(Canada) Glen Chorny	€2,020,000
5	10–14 September 2008	(Spain) EPT Barcelona Open	(Germany) Sebastian Ruthenberg	€1,361,000
5	1–5 October 2008	(United Kingdom) EPT London	(United States) Michael Martin	£1,000,000
5	28 October–1 November 2008	(Hungary) EPT Hungarian Open, Budapest	(United Kingdom) Will Fry	€595,840
5	15–19 November 2008	(Poland) EPT Warsaw Open	(Portugal) João Barbosa	€367,140
5	9–13 December 2008	(Czech Republic) EPT Prague	(Italy) Salvatore Bonavena	€774,000
5	5–10 January 2009	(The Bahamas) PokerStars Caribbean Adventure, Paradise Island	(Canada) Poorya Nazari	$3,000,000
5	20–24 January 2009	(France) EPT French Open, Deauville	(Germany) Moritz Kranich	€851,400
5	17–21 February 2009	(Denmark) EPT Scandinavian Open, Copenhagen	(Finland) Jens Kyllönen	DKr6,542,208
5	10–14 March 2009	(Germany) EPT German Open, Dortmund	(Germany) Sandra Naujoks	€917,000
5	18–23 April 2009	(Italy) EPT Sanremo	(Netherlands) Constant Rijkenberg	€1,508,000
5	28 April–3 May 2009	(Monaco) EPT Grand Final, Monte Carlo	(Netherlands) Pieter de Korver	€2,300,000
6	18–23 August 2009	(Ukraine) EPT Kyiv	(Russia) Maxim Lykov	€330,000
6	4–9 September 2009	(Spain) EPT Barcelona	(United States) Carter Phillips	€850,000
6	2–7 October 2009	(United Kingdom) EPT London	(United States) Aaron Gustavson	£850,000
6	20–25 October 2009	(Poland) EPT Warsaw	(France) Christophe Benzimra	zł1,493,170
6	17–22 November 2009	(Portugal) EPT Vilamoura	(Portugal) António Matias	€404,793
6	1–6 December 2009	(Czech Republic) EPT Prague	(Czech Republic) Jan Skampa	€682,000
6	5–11 January 2010	(The Bahamas) PokerStars Caribbean Adventure, Paradise Island	(United States) Harrison Gimbel	$2,200,000
6	20–25 January 2010	(France) EPT Deauville	(United Kingdom) Jake Cody	€847,000
6	16–21 February 2010	(Denmark) EPT Copenhagen	(Sweden) Anton Wigg	DKr3,675,000
6	2–7 March 2010	(Germany) EPT Berlin	(United States) Kevin MacPhee	€1,000,000
6	21–26 March 2010	(Austria) EPT Snowfest, Salzburg	(Denmark) Allan Bække	€445,000
6	15–21 April 2010	(Italy) EPT Sanremo	(United Kingdom) Liv Boeree	€1,250,000
6	25–30 April 2010	(Monaco) EPT Grand Final, Monte Carlo	(Lebanon) Nicolas Chouity	€1,700,000
7	11–16 August 2010	(Estonia) EPT Tallinn	(Norway) Kevin Stani	€400,000
7	28 August–2 September 2010	(Portugal) EPT Vilamoura	(United Kingdom) Toby Lewis	€467,836
7	29 September–4 October 2010	(United Kingdom) EPT London	(United Kingdom) David Vamplew	£900,000
7	26–31 October 2010	(Austria) EPT Vienna	(Germany) Michael Eiler	€700,000
7	22–27 November 2010	(Spain) EPT Barcelona	(Sweden) Kent Lundmark	€825,000
7	13–18 December 2010	(Czech Republic) EPT Prague	(United Kingdom) Roberto Romanello	€640,000
7	8–15 January 2011	(The Bahamas) PokerStars Caribbean Adventure, Paradise Island	(United States) Galen Hall	$2,300,000
7	25–31 January 2011	(France) EPT Deauville	(France) Lucien Cohen	€880,000
7	21–26 February 2011	(Denmark) EPT Copenhagen	(Sweden) Michael Tureniec	DKr3,700,000
7	20–25 March 2011	(Austria) EPT Snowfest, Salzburg	(Russia) Vladimir Geshkenbein	€390,000
7	5–10 April 2011	(Germany) EPT Berlin	(Canada) Ben Wilinofsky	€825,000
7	27 April–3 May 2011	(Italy) EPT Sanremo	(United Kingdom) Rupert Elder	€930,000
7	7–12 May 2011	(Spain) EPT Grand Final, Madrid	(Venezuela) Ivan Freitez	€1,500,000
8	2–7 August 2011	(Estonia) EPT Tallinn	(Switzerland) Ronny Kaiser	€275,000
8	27 August–1 September 2011	(Spain) EPT Barcelona	(Germany) Martin Schleich	€850,000
8	20 September–6 October 2011	(United Kingdom) EPT London	(Germany) Benny Spindler	£750,000
8	21–27 October 2011	(Italy) EPT Sanremo	(Russia) Andrey Pateychuk	€680,000
8	15–20 November 2011	(Greece) EPT Loutraki	(United Kingdom) Zimnan Ziyard	€347,000
8	5–10 December 2011	(Czech Republic) EPT Prague	(Germany) Martin Finger	€720,000
8	7–13 January 2012	(The Bahamas) PokerStars Caribbean Adventure, Paradise Island	(United States) John Dibella	$1,775,000
8	31 January–6 February 2012	(France) EPT Deauville	(Belarus) Vadim Kursevich	€875,000
8	20–25 February 2012	(Denmark) EPT Copenhagen	(Denmark) Mickey Petersen	DKr2,515,000
8	12–17 March 2012	(Spain) EPT Madrid	(Denmark) Frederik Jensen	€495,000
8	26–31 March 2012	(Italy) EPT Campione	(Denmark) Jannick Wrang	€640,000
8	16–21 April 2012	(Germany) EPT Berlin	(Belgium) Davidi Kitai	€712,000
8	25–30 April 2012	(Monaco) EPT Grand Final, Monte Carlo	(United States) Mohsin Charania	€1,350,000
9	15–25 August 2012	(Spain) EPT Barcelona	(Belarus) Mikalai Pobal	€1,007,550
9	5–11 October 2012	(Italy) EPT Sanremo	(France) Ludovic Lacay	€744,910
9	9–15 December 2012	(Czech Republic) EPT Prague	(Sweden) Ramzi Jelassi	€835,000
9	7–13 January 2013	(The Bahamas) PokerStars Caribbean Adventure, Paradise Island	(Bulgaria) Dimitar Danchev	$1,859,000
9	3–9 February 2013	(France) EPT Deauville	(France) Remi Castaignon	€770,000
9	10–16 March 2013	(United Kingdom) EPT London	(Netherlands) Ruben Visser	£595,000
9	21–27 April 2013	(Germany) EPT Berlin	(Germany) Daniel Pidun	€880,000
9	6–12 May 2013	(Monaco) EPT Grand Final, Monte Carlo	(United States) Steve O'Dwyer	€1,224,000
10	26 August–7 September 2013	(Spain) EPT Barcelona	(United Kingdom) Tom Middleton	€924,000
10	2–12 October 2013	(United Kingdom) EPT London	(Sweden) Robin Ylitalo	£560,980
10	12–18 December 2013	(Czech Republic) EPT Prague	(Germany) Julian Track	€725,700
10	7–13 January 2014	(The Bahamas) PokerStars Caribbean Adventure, Paradise Island	(Poland) Dominik Pańka	$1,423,096
10	26 January–1 February 2014	(France) EPT Deauville	(Greece) Sotirios Koutoupas	€614,000
10	23–29 March 2014	(Austria) EPT Vienna	(Ukraine) Oleksii Khoroshenin	€578,392
10	14–20 April 2014	(Italy) EPT Sanremo	(United Kingdom) Victoria Coren (2)	€476,100
10	26 April–2 May 2014	(Monaco) EPT Grand Final, Monte Carlo	(Italy) Antonio Buonanno	€1,240,000
11	16–27 August 2014	(Spain) EPT Barcelona	(Germany) Andre Lettau	€794,058
11	8–18 October 2014	(United Kingdom) EPT London	(Germany) Sebastian Pauli	£499,700
11	7–17 December 2014	(Czech Republic) EPT Prague	(United States) Stephen Graner	€969,000
11	8–14 January 2015	(The Bahamas) PokerStars Caribbean Adventure, Paradise Island	(United States) Kevin Schulz	$1,491,580
11	27 January–7 February 2015	(France) EPT Deauville	(Bulgaria) Ognyan Dimov	€543,700
11	17–28 March 2015	EPT Malta, St. Julian's, Portomaso	(France) Jean Montury	€687,400
11	28 April–8 May 2015	(Monaco) EPT Grand Final, Monte Carlo	(Spain) Adrián Mateos	€1,082,000
12	18–30 August 2015	(Spain) EPT Barcelona	(Indonesia) John Juanda	€1,022,593
12	20–31 October 2015	EPT Malta, Portomaso	(United Kingdom) Niall Farrell	€534,330
12	5–16 December 2015	(Czech Republic) EPT Prague	(Iran) Hossein Ensan	€754,510
12	6–14 January 2016	(The Bahamas) PokerStars Caribbean Adventure, Paradise Island	(Canada) Mike Watson	$728,325
12	9–20 February 2016	(Republic of Ireland) EPT Dublin	(Poland) Dzmitry Urbanovich	€561,900
12	26 April–6 May 2016	(Monaco) EPT Grand Final, Monte Carlo	(Slovakia) Jan Bendik	€961,800
13	16–28 August 2016	(Spain) EPT Barcelona	(Poland) Sebastian Malec	€1,122,800
13	18–29 October 2016	EPT Malta, Portomaso	(Belarus) Aliaksei Boika	€355,700
13	8–19 December 2016	(Czech Republic) EPT Prague	(Netherlands) Jasper Meijer van Putten	€699,300
PSC	6–14 January 2017	(The Bahamas) PSC Bahamas	(United States) Christian Harder	$429,664
PSC	14–20 March 2017	PSC Panama	(United States) Kenneth Smaron	$293,860
PSC	1–9 April 2017	PSC Macau	(Canada) Elliot Smith	HKD2,877,500
PSC	29 April–5 May 2017	(Monaco) PSC Monte Carlo	(Italy) Raffaele Sorrentino	€466,714
PSC	25–31 May 2017	(Russia) PSC Sochi	(Russia) Pavel Shirshikov	₽29,100,000
PSC	21–27 August 2017	(Spain) PSC Barcelona	(Sweden) Sebastian Sorensson	€987,043
PSC	12–18 December 2017	(Czech Republic) PSC Prague	(France) Kalidou Sow	€675,000
2018	6–14 January 2018	(The Bahamas) PokerStars Caribbean Adventure, Paradise Island	(Argentina) Maria Lampropulos	$1,081,100
2018	23–29 March 2018	(Russia) EPT Sochi	(Russia) Arsenii Karmatckii	₽27,300,000
2018	28 April–4 May 2018	(Monaco) EPT Monte Carlo	(France) Nicolas Dumont	€712,000
2018	27 August–2 September 2018	(Spain) EPT Barcelona	(Poland) Piotr Nurzynski	€1,037,109
2018	22–29 September 2018	(Russia) EPT Open Sochi	(Kazakhstan) Wjatscheslaw Bondarzew	₽12,063,300
2018	11–18 December 2018	(Czech Republic) EPT Prague	(Germany) Paul Michaelis	€840,000
2019	5–16 January 2019	(The Bahamas) PokerStars Caribbean Adventure, Paradise Island	(United States) David Rheem	$1,567,100
2019	24–29 March 2019	(Russia) EPT Sochi	(Israel) Uri Gilboa	₽27,475,000
2019	25 April–4 May 2019	(Monaco) PokerStars and Monte-Carlo Casino EPT	(Germany) Manig Löser	€603,777
2019	26 June–2 July 2019	(Spain) EPT Open Madrid	(Poland) Jakub Grzegorzek	€176,357
2019	20 August–1 September 2019	(Spain) EPT Barcelona	(Sweden) Simon Brändström	€1,290,166
2019	9–13 October 2019	(Russia) EPT Open Sochi	(China) Yi Ye	₽19,306,000
2019	11–17 December 2019	(Czech Republic) EPT Prague	(Belarus) Mikalai Pobal (2)	€1,005,600
2020 2021	6–11 October 2020	(Russia) EPT Sochi	(Russia) Ruslan Bogdanov	₽15,984,500
2020 2021	8–15 November 2020	PokerStars EPT Online I	(Sweden) Anton "WhatIfGod"; Bergstrom	$1,019,082
2020 2021	23–30 March 2021	(Russia) EPT Sochi	(Russia) Artur Martirosian	₽24,633,000
2020 2021	2–11 October 2021	(Russia) EPT Open Sochi	(Russia) Evgeniy Starinkov	₽16,029,300
2020 2021	8–19 December 2021	PokerStars EPT Online II	(Sweden) Anton "WhatIfGod"; Bergstrom (2)	$363.640
2022	5–16 March 2022	(Czech Republic) EPT Prague	(Poland) Grzegorz Główny	€692,252
2022	28 April–7 May 2022	(Monaco) EPT Monte Carlo	(Brazil) Marcelo Simões	€939,840
2022	8–21 August 2022	(Spain) EPT Barcelona	(Italy) Giuliano Bendinelli	€1,491,133
2022	18–28 October 2022	(United Kingdom) EPT London	(United Kingdom) Ian Hamilton	£664,400
2022	7–18 December 2022	(Czech Republic) EPT Prague	(Canada) Jordan Saccucci	€913,250
2023	23–29 January 2023	(The Bahamas) PokerStars Caribbean Adventure, New Providence	(Portugal) Michel Dattani	$1,316,963
2023	15–26 February 2023	(France) EPT Paris	(Romania) Razvan Belea	€1,170,000
2023	26 April–6 May 2023	(Monaco) EPT Monte Carlo	(Canada) Mike Watson (2)	€749,425
2023	21 August–3 September 2023	(Spain) EPT Barcelona	(France) Simon Wiciak	€1,134,375
2023	11–22 October 2023	EPT Cyprus	(Netherlands) Gilles Simon	$1,042,000
2023	4–15 December 2023	(Czech Republic) EPT Prague	(Republic of Ireland) Padraig O'Neill	€1,030,000
2024	14–25 February 2024	(France) EPT Paris	(United Kingdom) Barny Boatman	€1,287,800
2024	24 April–4 May 2024	(Monaco) EPT Monte Carlo	(Netherlands) Derk Van Luijk	€1,000,000
2024	26 August–8 September 2024	(Spain) EPT Barcelona	(United States) Stephen Song	€1,290,386
2024	9–20 October 2024	EPT Cyprus	(Germany) Oliver Weis	$1,030,000
2024	4–15 December 2024	(Czech Republic) EPT Prague	(Portugal) Pedro Marques	€963,450
2025	30 April–10 May 2025	(Monaco) EPT Monte Carlo	(Russia) Aleksandr Shevliakov	€1,000,000
2025	18-31 August 2025	(Spain) EPT Barcelona	(France) Thomas Eychenne	€1,217,175
2025	1-12 October 2025	EPT Malta	(Poland) Tomasz Brzezinski	€631,592
2025	13-14 December 2025	(Czech Republic) EPT Prague	(Israel) Matan Krakow	€778,255
2026	18 February–1 March 2026	(France) EPT Paris	(Portugal) Jorge Abreu	€1,148,600
2026	30 April–10 May 2026	(Monaco) EPT Monte Carlo	(Russia) Roman Stoica	€825,000
2026	16-29 August 2026	(Spain) EPT Barcelona	(Italy) Manuel Ferrari	€1,002,488
2026	2-13 December 2026	(Czech Republic) EPT Prague		
