= North American Poker Tour season 1 =

NAPT Season 1
- League: North American Poker Tour
- Sport: Texas Hold 'em
- Duration: January 5, 2010 – November 17, 2010

NAPT seasons
- Season 2 →

Below are the results for season 1 of the North American Poker Tour (NAPT).

== Results ==
=== (The Bahamas) PokerStars Caribbean Adventure ===
- Casino: Atlantis Resort, Bahamas
- Buy-in: $10,000 + $300
- 7-Day Event: January 5, 2010 to January 11, 2010
- Number of buy-ins: 1,529
- Total Prize Pool: $14,831,300
- Number of Payouts: 224
- Official Results: The Hendom Mob

Final Table
Place	Name	Prize
1st	(United States) Harrison Gimbel	$2,200,000
2nd	(United States) Tyler Reiman	$1,750,000
3rd	(United States) Barry Shulman	$1,350,000
4th	(United States) Benjamin Zamani	$1,000,000
5th	(United States) Ryan D'Angelo	$700,000
6th	(Norway) Aage Floenes Ravn	$450,000
7th	(United States) Zachary Goldberg	$300,000
8th	(United States) Tom Koral	$201,300

=== (The Bahamas) PokerStars Caribbean Adventure High Roller ===
- Casino: Atlantis Resort, Bahamas
- Buy-in: $25,000 + $500
- 4-Day Event: January 11, 2010 to January 14, 2010
- Number of buy-ins: 84
- Total Prize Pool: $2,058,000
- Number of Payouts: 16
- Official Results: The Hendom Mob

Final Table
Place	Name	Prize
1st	(United States) William Reynolds	$576,240
2nd	(Canada) Will Molson	$322,075
3rd	(Uruguay) Adolfo Vaeza	$218,150
4th	(Netherlands) Michiel Brummelhuis	$154,350
5th	(United States) Lisa Hamilton	$133,770
6th	(Germany) Tobias Reinkemeier	$108,045
7th	(Canada) Matthew Marafioti	$87,465
8th	(Russia) Dmitry Stelmak	$66,885

=== (United States) NAPT Venetian ===
- Casino: The Venetian, Paradise, Nevada
- Buy-in: $4,750 + $250
- 5-Day Event: February 20, 2010 to February 24, 2010
- Number of buy-ins: 872
- Total Prize Pool: $4,017,740
- Number of Payouts: 128
- Official Results: The Hendom Mob

Final Table
Place	Name	Prize
1st	(United States) Tom Marchese	$827,648
2nd	(United States) Sam Stein	$522,306
3rd	(United States) Daniel Clemente	$309,366
4th	(United States) Yunus Jamal	$241,064
5th	(United States) David Paredes	$184,816
6th	(United States) Thomas Fuller	$144,639
7th	(United States) John Cernuto	$104,461
8th	(United States) Eric Blair	$60,266

=== (United States) NAPT Venetian High Roller Bounty Shootout ===
- Casino: The Venetian, Paradise
- Buy-in: $25,000 + $600 ($20,000 to Prize Pool / $5,000 for Bounty)
- 2-Day Event: February 23, 2010 to February 25, 2010
- Number of buy-ins: 49
- Total Prize Pool: $1,240,000
- Number of Payouts: 7
- Official Results: The Hendom Mob

Final Table
Place	Name	Prize
1st	(United States) Ashton Griffin	$560,000
2nd	(United States) Hoyt Corkins	$100,000
3rd	(United States) Joe Cassidy	$95,000
4th	(United States) Scott Seiver	$215,000
5th	(United States) Faraz Jaka	$95,000
6th	(United States) Brett Richey	$90,000
7th	(Denmark) Peter Eastgate	$85,000

=== (United States) NAPT Mohegan Sun ===
- Casino: Mohegan Sun, Uncasville, Connecticut
- Buy-in: $4,700 + $300
- 5-Day Event: April 7, 2010 to April 11, 2010
- Number of buy-ins: 716
- Total Prize Pool: $3,365,200
- Number of Payouts: 104
- Official Results: The Hendom Mob

Final Table
Place	Name	Prize
1st	(United States) Vanessa Selbst	$750,000
2nd	(United States) Mike Beasley	$428,000
3rd	(United States) Michael Woods	$240,000
4th	(United States) Scott Seiver	$190,000
5th	(Canada) Alistar Melville	$150,000
6th	(United States) Derek Raymond	$115,000
7th	(United States) Cliff Josephy	$85,000
8th	(United States) Jonathan Aguiar	$60,244

=== (United States) NAPT Mohegan Sun High Roller Bounty Shootout ===
- Casino: Mohegan Sun, Uncasville, Connecticut
- Buy-in: $20,000 + $5,000 (bounty) + $600
- 2-Day Event: April 23, 2010 to April 25, 2010
- Number of buy-ins: 35
- Total Prize Pool: $875,000
- Number of Payouts: 6
- Official Results: The Hendom Mob

Final Table
Place	Name	Prize
1st	(United States) Jason Mercier	$475,000
2nd	(United States) Sam Stein	$75,000
3rd	(United States) Faraz Jaka	$80,000
4th	(United States) Matthew Glantz	$70,000
5th	(Canada) Shawn Buchanan	$80,000
6th	(United States) Luis Vazquez	$70,000

=== (United States) NAPT Los Angeles ===
- Casino: Bicycle Casino, Los Angeles, California
- Buy-in: $4,750 + $250
- 6-Day Event: November 12, 2010 to November 17, 2010
- Number of buy-ins: 701
- Total Prize Pool: $3,229,857
- Number of Payouts: 104
- Official Results: The Hendom Mob

Final Table
Place	Name	Prize
1st	(United States) Joe Tehan	$725,000
2nd	(United States) Chris DeMaci	$440,000
3rd	(United States) Al Grimes	$250,000
4th	(Canada) Anh Van Nguyen	$195,000
5th	(United States) Ray Henson	$145,000
6th	(United States) Michael Binger	$114,000
7th	(United States) Jason Mercier	$84,857
8th	(United States) Jacob Toole	$60,000
