= North American Poker Tour season 2 =

NAPT Season 2
- League: North American Poker Tour
- Sport: Texas Hold 'em
- Duration: January 8, 2011 – April 14, 2011

NAPT seasons
- ← Season 1 Season 3 →

Below are the results for season 2 of the North American Poker Tour (NAPT).

== Results ==
=== (The Bahamas) PokerStars Caribbean Adventure ===
- Casino: Atlantis Resort, Bahamas
- Buy-in: $10,000 + $300
- 7-Day Event: January 8, 2011 to January 15, 2011
- Number of buy-ins: 1,560
- Total Prize Pool: $15,132,000
- Number of Payouts: 232
- Official Results: The Hendom Mob

Final Table
Place	Name	Prize
1st	(United States) Galen Hall	$2,300,000
2nd	(United States) Chris Oliver	$1,800,000
3rd	(Romania) Anton Ionel	$1,350,000
4th	(United States) Sam Stein	$1,000,000
5th	(United States) Mike Sowers	$700,000
6th	(Panama) Bolivar Palacios	$450,000
7th	(United States) Max Weinberg	$300,000
8th	(Canada) Philippe Plouffe	$202,000

=== (The Bahamas) PokerStars Caribbean Adventure NAPT Bounty Shootout ===
- Casino: Atlantis Resort, Bahamas
- Buy-in: $5,000 + $250
- 7-Day Event: January 15, 2011 to January 16, 2011
- Number of buy-ins: 216
- Total Prize Pool: $838,100
- Number of Payouts: 36
- Official Results: The Hendom Mob

Shootout
Place	Name	Prize
1st	(Canada) Andrew Chen	$263,100
2nd	(United States) Shaun Deeb	$75,000
3rd	(Germany) Marko Neumann	$50,000
3rd	(United States) Mike Binger	$50,000
3rd	(United States) Scott Blumstein	$50,000
3rd	(United States) William Pilossoph	$50,000

=== (United States) NAPT Los Angeles / The Big Game ===
- Casino: The Bicycle Hotel & Casino, Bell Gardens, California
- Buy-in: $4,750 + $250
- 5-Day Event: March 5, 2011 to March 10, 2011

=== (United States) NAPT Los Angeles High Roller Bounty Shootout ===
- Casino: The Bicycle Hotel & Casino, Bell Gardens, California
- Buy-in: $10,000 + $300
- 5-Day Event: March 11, 2011 to March 12, 2011

The North American Poker Tour main event scheduled for March 5 to 10, 2011 and the high roller bounty shootout scheduled for March 11 to 12, 2011 at the Bicycle Casino in Los Angeles, California will proceed as previously planned, but not as a NAPT event. The NAPT and the Bicycle Casino reached the voluntary decision to hold the event without branding after constructive discussions with California gaming regulators. Both the NAPT and the Bicycle Casino look forward to working with California regulatory authorities as they consider the branding of such events in the future.

=== (United States) NAPT Mohegan Sun ===
- Casino: Mohegan Sun, Uncasville, Connecticut
- Buy-in: $5,000
- 5-Day Event: April 9, 2011 to April 13, 2011
- Number of buy-ins: 387
- Total Prize Pool: $1,764,330
- Number of Payouts: 56
- Official Results: The Hendom Mob

The winner of this same event in Season 1, Vanessa Selbst, repeats as the Season 2 winner.

Final Table
Place	Name	Prize
1st	(United States) Vanessa Selbst	$450,000
2nd	(United States) Dan Shak	$254,000
3rd	(United States) Tyler Kenney	$170,000
4th	(United States) Thomas Hoglund	$120,000
5th	(United States) Vincent Rubianes	$90,000
6th	(United States) Joe Tehan	$70,000
7th	(United States) Aaron Overton	$50,000
8th	(United States) Steve O'Dwyer	$32,330

=== (United States) NAPT Mohegan Sun High Roller Bounty Shootout ===
- Casino: Mohegan Sun, Uncasville, Connecticut
- Buy-in: $10,000
- 5-Day Event: April 12, 2011 to April 14, 2011
- Number of buy-ins: 78
- Total Prize Pool: $780
- Number of Payouts: 9
- Official Results: The Hendom Mob

Final Table
Place	Name	Prize
1st	(United States) Jason Mercier	$246,600
2nd	(Ukraine) Eugene Katchalov	$68,000
3rd	(United States) Michael Pesek	$70,000
4th	(United States) Jonathan Jaffe	$54,000
5th	(United States) Taylor von Kriegenbergh	$44,000
6th	(United States) James Guinther	$42,000
7th	(United States) Scott Blackman	$44,000
8th	(United States) Micah Raskin	$46,000

== Suspension ==
On April 15, 2011, along with similar competitors' sites, the NAPT's affiliated website, PokerStars.com, was seized and shut down by U.S. Attorney's Office for the Southern District of New York, which alleged that PokerStars was in violation of federal bank fraud and money laundering laws. The company subsequently stopped allowing players from the United States to play real money games.

As of February 13, 2012, the NAPT website, and information on remaining events for Season 2, has not been updated since the April 15, 2011 seizure.

As of March 3, 2012 (possibly earlier), the North American Poker Tour website no longer shows the North American series—redirecting instead to information regarding the Latin American Poker Tour.

On August 30, 2023, PokerStars announced that the North American Poker Tour would return to the US with a stop in Las Vegas, Nevada, in November.
