= France Poker Series =

Regional poker tour

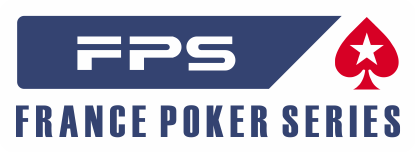
- Sport: poker
- Founded: 2010
- Folded: 2024
- Replaced by: PokerStars Open
- Country: France; Morocco; Monaco; Belgium
- Last champion: (France) Zine Benrebai (2024)
- Most titles: (Ukraine) Yury Nesterenko (2014/2014) (France) Anthony Apicella (2014/2022)
- Sponsor: PokerStars
- Tournament format: Texas Hold'em
- Website: pokerstarslive.com

The France Poker Series (FPS) started in May 2010, is a major regional poker tour in France and French speaking countries. The tour is sponsored by PokerStars.com, like its counterparts, the European Poker Tour (2004), Asia Pacific Poker Tour (2007), Latin American Poker Tour (2008) and North American Poker Tour (2010).

== History ==
The FPS is a series of poker tournaments that ran for 6 seasons from 2010 to 2016 and 29 stops in France, Morocco and Monaco, where the best poker players from the region and the world competed for the title of champion of FPS.
In 2017, the series was discontinued, as well as other poker series around the world sponsored by PokerStars.net, rebranding to the PokerStars Festival for country tours and PokerStars Championship for major regional tours, which brought together all other regional tours such as LAPT (Latin American Poker Tour), EKA (Eureka Poker Tour), IPT (Italian Poker Tour), ESPT (Estrellas Poker Tour) UKIPT (UK and Ireland Poker Tour), among others. In 2018 the PokerStars Festival was discontinued.
In 2022, PokerStars.net announces the return of the France Poker Series in events that took place in France and Monaco.
Discontinued: In 2024, PokerStars announced the new PokerStars Open that replaces the following tours: EKA (Eureka Poker Tour), UKIPT (UK and Ireland Poker Tour), FPS (France Poker Series) and ESPT (Estrellas Poker Tour), starting in March 2025.

== Results ==
=== Season 1 ===
Date	Event / City	Players	Prize Pool	Winner	Prize	Results
1–2 May 2010	(France) FPS Beaulieu €1,200; Casino de Beaulieu	149	€157,345	(Argentina) Jose Ignacio Barbero	€40,123	
25–26 September 2010	(France) FPS Divonne €1,200; Casino de Divonne-les-Bains	399	€421,344	(Switzerland) Serge Didisheim	€108,894	
16–17 October 2010	(France) FPS Saint-Amand €1,200; Casino de Saint-Amand-les-Eaux	228	€235,488	(France) David Jaoui	€42,175	
13–14 November 2010	(France) FPS Lyon €1,200; Casino Le Lyon Vert	228	€342,144	(France) Christophe Monnin	€88,444	
18–19 December 2010	(France) FPS Forges-les-Eaux €1,200; Grand Casino de Forges-les-Eaux	265	€279,440	(France) Mathieu Thiry	€75,000	
9–14 February 2011	(France) FPS Paris FINAL €2,000; Cercle Haussmann Paris	567	€979,776	(Germany) Marvin Rettenmaier	€244,036	

=== Season 2 ===
Date	Event / City	Players	Prize Pool	Winner	Prize	Results
30 November-4 December 2011	(Morocco) FPS Mazagan Dhs 13,200 (~€1,180); Mazagan Beach Resort, El Jadida	305	Dhs 3,579,785 (~€320,045)	(Morocco) Anas Tadini	Dhs 900,000 (~€80,463)	
31 January-6 February 2012	(France) EPT/FPS Deauville €1,200; Casino Barrière de Deauville	329	€315,840	(France) Ludovic Sultan	€82,000	
21–25 March 2012	(France) FPS Snowfest Evian €1,200; Casino d'Evian	296	€284,160	(Czech Republic) Veronika Pavlikova	€70,000	
10–13 May 2012	(France) FPS Amnéville €1,100; Casino Tranchant Seven, Amnéville	317	€304,320	(England) Ben Dobson	€70,000	
27 June-1 July 2012	(France) FPS Gujan-Mestras €1,100; Casino du Lac de la Magdeleine, Gujan-Mestras	172	€165,120	(France) Florian Desgouttes	€43,000	
11–14 October 2012	(Morocco) FPS Mazagan Dhs 12,000 (~€1,050); Mazagan Beach Resort, El Jadida	208	Dhs 2,219,360 (~€194,302)	(Morocco) Karim Rharbaoui	Dhs 505,000 (~€44,212)	
13–19 November 2012	(France) FPS Paris €1,100; Cercle Cadet, Paris	715	€709,738	(Poland) Mateusz Rypulak	€150,000	
30 January-3 February 2013	(France) FPS Deauville FINAL €1,200; Casino Barrière de Deauville	828	€794,880	(Canada) Patrick Braga	€165,000	

=== Season 3 ===
Date	Event / City	Players	Prize Pool	Winner	Prize	Results
21–24 March 2013	(France) FPS Snowfest Evian €1,100; Casino d'Evian	280	€268,800	(England) Neil Raine	€60,000	
30 May-2 June 2013	(France) FPS Amnéville €1,100; Casino Tranchant Seven, Amnéville	417	€400,320	(France) Ibrahim Feliani	€92,000	
23–29 September 2013	(France) FPS Sunfest Cannes €1,100; JOA Royal Casino Cannes-Mandelieu	559	€536,640	(Lithuania) Giedrius Gradeckas	€92,000	
16–23 November 2013	(France) FPS Paris €1,100; Cercle Cadet, Paris	818	€811,980	(France) Rodolphe Dethiere	€153,000	
22–26 January 2014	(France) FPS Deauville FINAL €1,100; Casino Barrière de Deauville	1,095	€1,051,200	(Netherlands) Niels van Leeuwen	€175,000	

=== Season 4 ===
Date	Event / City	Players	Prize Pool	Winner	Prize	Results
23–26 April 2014	(Monaco) EPT/FPS Monte Carlo €1,200; Monte-Carlo Bay Hotel & Resort	837	€811,890	(Ukraine) Yury Nesterenko	€150,000	
2–5 October 2014	(France) FPS Sunfest Cannes €1,200; JOA Royal Casino Cannes-Mandelieu	582	€558,720	(Ukraine) Yury Nesterenko	€91,000	
21 November 2014	(France) FPS Paris €1,200; Cercle Cadet Paris	CANCELLED by PokerStars due French authorities decided to close down Cercle Cadet for an "undetermined amount of time" after an operation carried out by the French Judicial Police (DCPJ) on Oct. 14.				
20 December 2014	(France) STUDENT FRANCE POKER SERIES €150; Guaranteed Prize Pool €10,000; Casino Barrière de Deauville	164	€21,254	(France) Patrick Miangu	€5,000	
28 January-1 February 2015	(France) EPT/FPS Deauville €1,200; Casino Barrière de Deauville	1,355	€1,300,800	(France) Anthony Apicella	€197,000	

=== Season 5 ===
Date	Event / City	Players	Prize Pool	Winner	Prize	Results
28 April-2 May 2015	(Monaco) EPT/FPS Monte Carlo €1,200; Monte-Carlo Bay Hotel & Resort	993	€963,210	(Germany) Sebastian Supper	€177,000	
21–26 July 2015	(France) FPS Lille €1,100; Hotel Casino Barrière de Lille	745	€715,200	(Belgium) Bart Lybaert	€122,000	
15–20 December 2015	(France) FPS ENGHIEN €1,100; Casino Barrière de d'Enghien	940	€902,400	(France) Arnaud Desbrosse	€147,000	

=== Season 6 ===
Date	Event / City	Players	Prize Pool	Winner	Prize	Results
25 April-6 May 2016	(Monaco) EPT/FPS Monte Carlo €1,200; Monte-Carlo Bay Hotel & Resort	1,261	€1,223,170	(France) Stephane Dossetto	€218,000	
19–24 July 2016	(France) FPS/UKIPT Lille €1,100; Hotel Casino Barrière de Lille	726	€696,960	(France) Fabrice Casano	€121,000	
20–25 September 2016	(France) FPS Deauville €1,100; Casino Barrière de Deauville	615	€590,400	(France) Gabriel Nassif	€113,030	

=== Season 2022 ===
Date	Event / City	Players	Prize Pool	Winner	Prize	Results
28 April-7 May	(Monaco) EPT/FPS Monte Carlo €1,100; Monte-Carlo Bay Hotel & Resort	1,918	€1,841,280	(Brazil) Lucas Scafini	€250,000	
4–9 October	(France) FPS Divonne €1,100; Casino de Divonne-les-Bains	628	€603,020	(France) Nicolas Hamouni	€113,670	
18–27 November	(France) FPS Aix-en-Provence €1,100; Pasino Grand Aix-en-Provence	779	€747,840	(France) Anthony Apicella	€141,200	

=== Season 2023 ===
Date	Event / City	Players	Prize Pool	Winner	Prize	Results
15–26 February	(France) EPT/FPS Paris €1,100; Hyatt Regency Paris Étoile	2,071	€1,988,160	(France) Alan Goasdoue	€287,830	
26 April-6 May	(Monaco) EPT/FPS Monte Carlo €1,100; Monte-Carlo Bay Hotel & Resort	2,138	€2,052,480	(Japan) Daisuke Ogita	€307,160	
15–23 July	(France) FPS Stade Jean-Bouin Paris €1,100; Stade Jean-Bouin (Paris)	1,384	€1,328,640	(Italy) Lorenzo Arduini	€211,000	
3–8 October	(France) FPS Aix-les-Bains €1,100; Casino Grand Cercle Aix-les-Bains	475	€456,000	(France) Alban Juen	€90,070	
10–19 November	(France) FPS Aix-en-Provence €1,100; Pasino Grand Aix-en-Provence	611	€586,560	(India) Sahil Chutani	€110,400	

=== Season 2024 ===
Date	Event / City	Players	Prize Pool	Winner	Prize	Results
14–25 February	(France) EPT/FPS Paris €1,100; Palais des congrès de Paris	4,149	€3,983,040	(Netherlands) Mateusz Moolhuizen	€470,830	
24–28 April	EPT/FPS Monte Carlo €1,100; Sporting Monte Carlo, Larvotto, Monaco	2,096	€2,012,160	(Bulgaria) Atanas Malinov	€303,190	
30 September-6 October	(France) FPS Aix-les-Bains €1,100; Casino Grand Cercle Aix-les-Bains	660	€633,600	(France) Zine Benrebai	€122,150	
Sponsored Events
8–20 May	BPC Namur €1,100; Guarantted Prizepool €1,000,000; Circus Casino Resort, Namur, Belgium	1,259	€1,266,388	(France) Rayane Benounnane	€200,000	

== Winners by country ==
Place	Country	Times
1st	France	19
2nd	England	2
	Germany	2
	Morocco	2
	Netherlands	2
	Ukraine	2
7th	Argentina	1
	Belgium	1
	Brazil	1
	(Bulgaria) Bulgary	1
	Canada	1
	Czech Republic	1
	India	1
	Italy	1
	Japan	1
	Lithuania	1
	Poland	1
	Switzerland	1
		41

Up to Season 2024 - FPS Aix-les-Bains
