= North American Poker Tour season 2024 =

NAPT Season 2024
- League: North American Poker Tour
- Sport: Texas Hold 'em
- Duration: November 1, 2024 – November 10, 2024

NAPT seasons
- ← Season 3 Season 2025 →

Below are the results for season 4 of the North American Poker Tour (NAPT).

== Results ==
=== (United States) NAPT Las Vegas Main Event ===
- Casino: Resorts World, Las Vegas, United States
- Buy-in: $5,000 + $300
- 6-Day Event: November 5, 2024 to November 10, 2024
- Number of buy-ins: 895
- Guaranteed Prize Pool: $3,000,000
- Total Prize Pool: $4,340,750
- Number of Payouts: 127
- Official Results: The Hendom Mob

Final Table
Place	Name	Prize
1st	(England) Nicholas Marchington	$765,200
2nd	(United States) Joel Micka	$478,450
3rd	(United States) Jeff Madsen	$341,750
4th	(United States) Marco Johnson	$262,900
5th	(United States) Curt Kohlberg	$202,250
6th	(Japan) Masato Yokosawa	$155,550
7th	(United States) Brock Wilson	$119,650
8th	(United States) Matthew Affleck	$92,000

=== (United States) NAPT Las Vegas Super High Roller ===
- Casino: Resorts World, Las Vegas, United States
- Buy-in: $25,000
- 3-Day Event: November 4, 2024 to November 6, 2024
- Number of buy-ins: 60
- Total Prize Pool: $1,440,600
- Number of Payouts: 8
- Official Results: The Hendom Mob

Final Table
Place	Name	Prize
1st	(United States) Stephen Song	$439,400
2nd	(United States) Sean Winter	$288,100
3rd	(United States) Edward Sebesta	$208,900
4th	(United States) James Collopy	$158,500
5th	(Spain) Elias Gutierrez Hernandez	$122,500
6th	(France) Thomas Eychenne	$93,600
7th	(United States) Brock Wilson	$72,000
8th	(United States) Paul Jager	$57,600

=== (United States) NAPT Las Vegas High Roller ===
- Casino: Resorts World, Las Vegas, United States
- Buy-in: $10,000 + $300
- 3-Day Event: November 8, 2024 to November 10, 2024
- Number of buy-ins: 170
- Total Prize Pool: $1,649,000
- Number of Payouts: 23
- Official Results: The Hendom Mob

Final Table
Place	Name	Prize
1st	(United States) Sam Soverel	$385,750
2nd	(United States) Nicholas Seward	$241,100
3rd	(United States) Barry Woods	$172,200
4th	(United States) David Coleman	$132,450
5th	(Ukraine) Valentyn Shabelnyk	$101,900
6th	(United States) Adam Adler	$78,400
7th	(United States) Danny Wong	$63,700
8th	(United States) Brian Altman	$53,100

=== (United States) NAPT Las Vegas Mystery Bounty ===
- Casino: Resorts World, Las Vegas, United States
- Buy-in: $300 + $250
- 4-Day Event: November 1, 2024 to November 4, 2024
- Number of buy-ins: 1,201
- Total Prize Pool: $360,300
- Number of Payouts: 179
- Official Results: The Hendom Mob

Final Table
Place	Name	Prize
1st	(Croatia) Gregor Šverko	$46,800
2nd	(England) Dan Samson	$28,800
3rd	(United States) Shyamsundar Challa	$20,530
4th	(United States) Chanelle Morimatsu	$15,800
5th	(Belgium) Alexandro Tricarico	$12,180
6th	(United States) Christopher Johnston	$9,420
7th	(United States) Victor Paredes	$7,280
8th	(United States) Erik Seidel	$5,640

=== (United States) NAPT Las Vegas CUP ===
- Casino: Resorts World, Las Vegas, United States
- Buy-in: $550
- 4-Day Event: November 8, 2025 to November 10, 2025
- Number of buy-ins: 1,006
- Total Prize Pool: $484,320
- Number of Payouts: 149
- Official Results: The Hendom Mob

Final Table
Place	Name	Prize
1st	(United States) Erez Klein	$82,100
2nd	(England) Michael Paraskevin	$51,240
3rd	(United States) Zachary Vankeuren	$36,600
4th	(Canada) Glenn Slater	$28,160
5th	(United States) Khang Tat Pham	$21,650
6th	(United States) Kyle Watanabe	$16,660
7th	(United States) Jacob Mendelsohn	$12,810
8th	(United States) I-Le Wu	$5,640

=== (United States) NAPT Las Vegas RunGood ===
- Casino: Resorts World, Las Vegas, United States
- Buy-in: $550
- 4-Day Event: November 1, 2024 to November 10, 2024
- Number of buy-ins: 480
- Total Prize Pool: $460,800
- Number of Payouts: 72
- Official Results: The Hendom Mob

Final Table
Place	Name	Prize
1st	(United States) Richard Bai	$68,530
2nd	(United States) Camilo Bencosme	$65,757
3rd	(United States) Kyle Watanabe	$52,593
4th	(Belgium) Fabian Gumz	$31,260
5th	(United States) Benjamin Ludlow	$23,960
6th	(United States) Paul Lampl	$18,500
7th	(United States) Victor Holanda	$14,320
8th	(Luxembourg) Yi Lin	$10,940
