= Eureka Poker Tour =

Regional poker tour

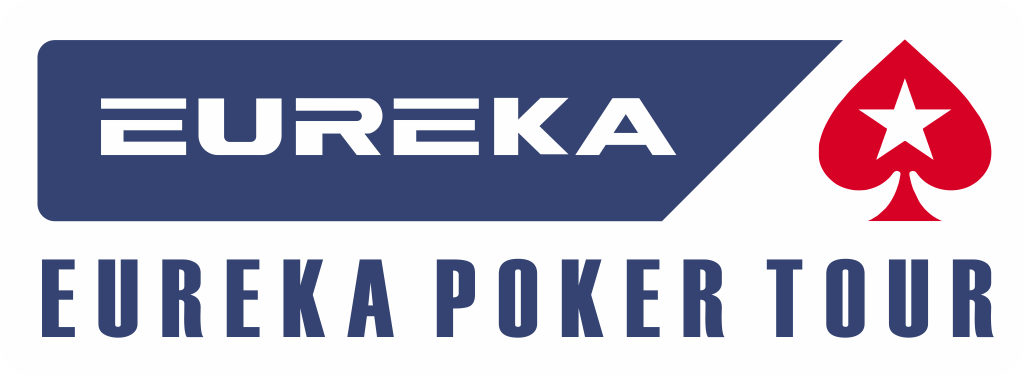
- Sport: Texas Hold 'em
- Founded: 2011
- Folded: 2024
- Replaced by: PokerStars Open
- Country: Czech Republic; Slovenia; Bulgaria; Croatia; Latvia; Austria; Germany; Romania; Cyprus
- Last champion: (Bulgaria) Martin Tsvetanov (2024)
- Sponsor: PokerStars
- Website: pokerstarslive.com

The Eureka Poker Tour (EKA) started in March 2011, is a major regional poker tour in the central and eastern Europe. The tour is sponsored by PokerStars.com, like its counterparts, the European Poker Tour (2004), Asia Pacific Poker Tour (2007), Latin American Poker Tour (2008) and North American Poker Tour (2010).

== History ==
After a run across Central and Eastern Europe for Season 1, PokerStars.com launched the Season 2 of the Poker Tour adding a venue in Latvia for this season.

From 2013 to 2016, PokerStars.com organized more than 15 stops of EKA events across central and eastern Europe.

In 2017, the EKA series was discontinued and rebranded as the PokerStars Festival. In 2022, pokerstars.com announced the return of regional tours as EKA (Eureka Poker Tour), UKIPT (UK and Ireland Poker Tour), FPS (France Poker Series) and ESPT (Estrellas Poker Tour).

Discontinued: In 2024, PokerStars announced the new PokerStars Open that replaces the following tours: EKA (Eureka Poker Tour), UKIPT (UK and Ireland Poker Tour), FPS (France Poker Series) and ESPT (Estrellas Poker Tour), starting in March 2025.

== Season 1 ==
Date	Event / City	Players	Prize Pool	Winner	Prize	Results
17–20 March 2011	(Czech Republic) EKA Prague €800	329	€243,460	(England) Keith Johnson	€58,400	
12–15 May 2011	(Slovenia) EKA Nova Gorica €800	211	€149,410	(Spain) Antonio Dieguez Rodriguez	€40,010	
23–26 June 2011	(Bulgaria) EKA Varna €800	308	€224,840	(Israel) Idan Greenberg	€55,145	
24–27 August 2011	(Croatia) EKA Zagreb €800	259	€183,400	(Hungary) Richard Bodis	€47,298	
4–10 December 2011	(Czech Republic) EPT/EKA Prague €330 Deepstack	203	€59,073	(Norway) Geir Engholm	€13,100	

- Eureka Poker Tour - Season 1 - Leaderboard Champion: (Spain) Antonio Dieguez Rodriguez, he won entries to all Sunday Million tournaments on PokerStars.com in calendar year 2012

== Season 2 ==
Date	Event / City	Players	Prize Pool	Winner	Prize	Results
9–14 April 2012	EKA Croatia €1,100	178	€172,660	(Croatia) Alija Filipovic	€42,700	
4–10 June 2012	EKA Bulgaria €1,100	246	€238,590	(Bulgaria) Petar Zografov	€48,745	
1–7 October 2012	EKA Latvia €1,100	278	€269,660	(Finland) Lauri Merikallio	€68,800	
5–15 December 2012	(Czech Republic) EPT/EKA Prague €1,100	652	€632,440	(Cyprus) Menikos Panayiotou	€137,100	

- Eureka Poker Tour - Season 2 - Leaderboard Champion: (Croatia) Alija Filipovic, he won one EPT Season 9 Main Event Entry of his choice (€5,300)

== Season 3 ==
Date	Event / City	Players	Prize Pool	Winner	Prize	Results
18–24 March 2013	(Czech Republic) EKA Rozvadov €1,100 €500,000 Guaranteed	500	€500,000	(Belgium) Bart Lybaert	€115,000	
24–30 May 2013	EKA Croatia €1,100	283	€274,510	(Hungary) Achilles Bozso	€59,100	
22–28 July 2013	EKA Bulgaria €1,100	417	€404,490	(Israel) Liran Machluf	€93,000	
8–18 December 2013	(Czech Republic) EPT/EKA Prague €1,100	1,315	€1,275,550	(Austria) Dimitri Holdeew	€226,400	

- Eureka Poker Tour - Season 3 - Leaderboard Champion: (Russia) Sergei Popov, he won one EPT Season 10 Main Event Entry of his choice (€5,300)

== Season 4 ==
Date	Event / City	Players	Prize Pool	Winner	Prize	Results
19–29 March 2014	(Austria) EPT/EKA Vienna €1,100	1,432	€1,389,040	(Hungary) Zoltan Gal	€208,655	
26 May-3 June 2014	(Czech Republic) EKA Rozvadov €1,100 €500,000 Guaranteed	493	€500,000	(Slovakia) Martin Meciar	€87,600	
6–9 November 2014	(Czech Republic) EKA Rozvadov €550; PokerStars King's Cup €200,000 Guaranteed	551	€267,235	(Germany) Philipp Hartmann	€45,000	
7–17 December 2014	(Czech Republic) EPT/EKA Prague €1,100	1,738	€1,685,860	(Hungary) Balazs Botond	€206,948	

- Eureka Poker Tour - Season 4 - Leaderboard Champion: (Russia) Gennady Menshikov, he won one EPT Season 11 Main Event Entry of his choice (€5,300)

== Season 5 ==
Date	Event / City	Players	Prize Pool	Winner	Prize	Results
21 February-1 March 2015	(Czech Republic) EKA Rozvadov €1,100	664	€644,080	(Austria) Raphael Wimmer	€99,685	
22–31 May 2015	(Germany) EKA Hamburg €1,100	581	€563,570	(Germany) Tom Holke	€107,920	
5–16 December 2015	(Czech Republic) EPT/EKA Prague €1,100	1,893	€1,836,210	(Spain) Javier Rojas Mederos	€311,000	

- Eureka Poker Tour - Season 5 - Leaderboard GOLD Champion: (Bulgaria) Vladimir Velikov
- Eureka Poker Tour - Season 5 - Leaderboard SILVER Champion: (France) Yohann Nataf

How it works? Player of the Year: the Silver tier will award points for all events with a buy-in of $600 and lower; and the Gold tier will count all other events across the EUREKA Festivals, no matter the buy-in.

== Season 6 ==
Date	Event / City	Players	Prize Pool	Winner	Prize	Results
2–8 March 2016	(Czech Republic) EKA Rozvadov €1,100 €500,000 Guaranteed	682	€661,540	(Argentina) Ivan Luca	€106,186	
16–22 May 2016	(Romania) EKA Bucharest €1,100	579	€561,630	(Israel) Avishai Shitrit	€107,350	
23 September-3 October 2016	(Germany) EKA Hamburg €1,100	367	€355,990	(Switzerland) Dinesh Alt	€69,120	
8–19 December 2016	(Czech Republic) EPT/EKA Prague €1,100	2,031	€1,970,070	(Poland) Hubert Matuszewski	€193,298	

- Eureka Poker Tour - Season 6 - Leaderboard GOLD Champion: (Netherlands) Tobias Peters
- Eureka Poker Tour - Season 6 - Leaderboard SILVER Champion: (Czech Republic) Michal Mrakeš

How it works? Player of the Year: the Silver tier will award points for all events with a buy-in of $600 and lower; and the Gold tier will count all other events across the EUREKA Festivals, no matter the buy-in.

== Season 2022 ==
Date	Event / City	Players	Prize Pool	Winner	Prize	Results
5–16 March 2022	(Czech Republic) EPT/EKA Prague €1,100	3,155	€3,028,800	(Argentina) Alejandro Lococo	€417,820	
20–29 May 2022	(Czech Republic) EKA Rozvadov €1,100 €1,000,000 Guaranteed	1,096	€1,041,200	(Italy) Giorgio Montebelli	€146,126	
25–31 July 2022	(Romania) EKA Bucharest €1,100	407	€390,720	(Romania) Adrian Gusti Sas	€77,430	
7–18 December 2022	(Czech Republic) EPT/EKA Prague €1,100	4,017	€3,856,320	(Netherlands) Pieter Theelen	€496,760	

== Season 2023 ==
Date	Event / City	Players	Prize Pool	Winner	Prize	Results
13–20 March 2023	(Czech Republic) EKA Rozvadov €1,100 €1,000,000 Guaranteed	1,866	€1,772,700	(Germany) Jörg Schneegass	€187,335	
26 September-3 October 2023	(Germany) EKA Hamburg €1,100	703	€667,850	(Germany) Amir Mozaffarian	€123,780	
11–22 October 2023	EPT/EKA Cyprus S1,100	2,659	$2,552,640	(India) Ankit Ahuja	$362,365	
6–17 December 2023	(Czech Republic) EPT/EKA Prague €1,100	4,403	€4,226,880	(Austria) Alexander Tkatschew	€511,710	

== Season 2024 ==
Date	Event / City	Players	Prize Pool	Winner	Prize	Schedule
8–18 March 2024	EKA Rozvadov €1,100; Guaranteed Prize Pool €1,000,000; King's Casino, Rozvadov, Czech Republic	1,526	€1,449,700	(Czech Republic) Robert Röhlich	€243,500	
1–7 July 2024	EKA Hamburg €1,100; Casino Schenefeld, Hamburg, Germany	645	€584,250	(Ukraine) Khossein Kokhestani	€110,070	
9–20 October 2024	EPT/EKA Cyprus $1,100; Merit Royal Hotel & Casino, Kyrenia, Cyprus	1,038	$2,662,850	(England) Leo Worthington-Leese	$314,030*	
4–15 December 2024	EPT/EKA Prague €1,100; King's Casino, Prague, Czech Republic	4,732	€4,542,720	(Bulgaria) Martin Tsvetanov	€449,034*	

* denote deal

== Winners by country ==
Place	Country	Times
1st	Germany	4
	Hungary	4
3rd	Austria	3
	Israel	3
5th	Argentina	2
	(Bulgaria) Bulgary	2
	England	2
	Spain	2
9th	Belgium	1
	Croatia	1
	Cyprus	1
	Czech Republic	1
	Finland	1
	India	1
	Italy	1
	Netherlands	1
	Norway	1
	Poland	1
	(Romania) Romenia	1
	Slovakia	1
	Switzerland	1
	Ukraine	1
Total		36

Up to Season 2024 EUREKA Prague / In case of a tie, it will be sorted alphabetically
