= UK and Ireland Poker Tour =

Regional poker tour

- Sport: Texas Hold 'em
- Founded: 2009
- Folded: 2024
- Replaced by: PokerStars Open
- Country: United Kingdom; Ireland; Isle of Man; Malta; Spain
- Last champion: (England) Alejandro Romero (2024)
- Sponsor: PokerStars
- Website: pokerstarslive.com

The UK and Ireland Poker Tour (UKIPT) started in December 2009, is a major regional poker tour in the United Kingdom and Ireland. The UKIPT is sponsored by PokerStars.com, like its counterparts, the European Poker Tour (2004), Asia Pacific Poker Tour (2007), Latin American Poker Tour (2008) and North American Poker Tour (2010). Season 2 of the UKIPT was shown on terrestrial television in the UK on Channel 4 and was hosted by Nick Wealthall and Liv Boeree.

Discontinued: In 2024, PokerStars announced the new PokerStars Open that replaces the following tours: EKA (Eureka Poker Tour), UKIPT (UK and Ireland Poker Tour), FPS (France Poker Series) and ESPT (Estrellas Poker Tour), starting in March 2025.

== Season 1 ==
Date	Event / City	Players	Prize Pool	Winner	Prize	Results
11–14 December 2009	(Republic of Ireland) UKIPT Galway €2,000	259	€471,380	(Republic of Ireland) Padraig Parkinson	€125,000	
11–14 February 2010	(England) UKIPT Manchester £550	518	£259,000	(Netherlands) Joeri Zandvliet	£63,200	
8–11 April 2010	(England) UKIPT Coventry £550	368	£184,000	(Belgium) Gilles Augustus	£46,000	
12–17 May 2010	(England) UKIPT Nottingham £550	650	£325,000	(England) Andrew Couldridge	£80,000	
24–27 June 2010	(Republic of Ireland) UKIPT Killarney €1,100	253	€253,000	(Republic of Ireland) Femi Fakinle	€63,400	
15–19 July 2010	(England) UKIPT Brighton £1,100	259	£259,000	(England) Jamie Burland	£65,400	
19–22 August 2010	(Scotland) UKIPT Edinburgh £550	401	£200,600	(Canada) Nicholas Abou Risk	£50,000	
9–12 September 2010	(Republic of Ireland) UKIPT Dublin €560	590	€295,000	(Republic of Ireland) Max Silver	€72,000	
31 Sep-4 Oct, 2010	(England) EPT/UKIPT London £5,250	848	£4,112,800	(Scotland) David Vamplew	£900,000	

- United Kingdom & Ireland Poker Tour - Season 1 - Leaderboard Champion:: (England) Christopher Brammer. Won buy-ins and hotel package to all events for UKIPT Season 2.
- All champions of the UKIPT Season 1 main events, won tickets to EPT London 2010 Main Event (31 Sep-4 Oct, 2010) and a seat in the Sit´n´go Champion of Champions running at EPT London 2010.
- Champion of Champions UKIPT Season 1 Winner: (Scotland) David Vamplew. Won a seat at every stop of UKIPT Season 2, including the Grand Final at EPT London in 2011

== Season 2 ==
Date	Event / City	Players	Prize Pool	Winner	Prize	Results
2–5 December 2010	(Republic of Ireland) UKIPT Galway €1,100	266	€266,000	(Canada) Nicholas Abou Risk	€67,100	
11–14 February 2011	(England) UKIPT Nottingham £560	1,058	£529,000	(England) Gareth Walker	£109,000	
10–14 March 2011	(England) UKIPT Manchester £550	615	£307,500	(England) Matthew McDerra	£74,000	
19–22 May 2011	(Republic of Ireland) UKIPT Cork €560	602	€291,970	(England) Sam Razavi	€71,000	
16–20 June 2011	(England) UKIPT Newcastle £550	554	£277,000	(Scotland) Richard Sinclair	£67,000	
14–17 July 2011	(England) UKIPT Brighton £550	603	£292,455	(England) Chris O'Donnell	£71,000	
11–14 August 2011	(Scotland) UKIPT Edinburgh £560	519	£251,715	(Republic of Ireland) Fintan Gavin	£61,500	
8–12 September 2011	(Republic of Ireland) UKIPT Dublin €560	718	€348,230	(Netherlands) Joeri Zandvliet	€83,500	
30 Sep- 6 Oct, 2011	(England) EPT/UKIPT London £5,250	691	£3,351,350	(Germany) Benny Spindler	£750,000	

- United Kingdom & Ireland Poker Tour - Season 2 - Leaderboard Champion: (England) Sam Razavi, He earns a free ticket to every UKIPT event in season 3 for his efforts
- All champions of the UKIPT Season 2 main events, won a seat in the Sit´n´go Champion of Champions running at Dusk Till Dawn poker club in Nottinghamin December, 2011.
- Champion of Champions UKIPT Season 2 Winner: (Scotland) Richard Sinclair. For his efforts he won a seat and accommodation to every stop of UKIPT Season 3. A 3 episodes TV show of Champion of Champions UKIPT Season 2 you can find here: - -

== Season 3 ==
Date	Event / City	Players	Prize Pool	Winner	Prize	Results
16–20 February 2012	(Republic of Ireland) UKIPT Galway €770	698	€476,765	(Republic of Ireland) Emmett Mullin	€100,000	
12–16 April 2012	(England) UKIPT Nottingham £770	1,625	£1,137,500	(England) Robert Baguley	£210,400	
17–21 May 2012	(Republic of Ireland) UKIPT Dublin €770	597	€417,900	(Wales) Richard Evans	€75,500	
6–10 September 2012	(England) UKIPT Newcastle £770	623	£436,100	(Scotland) Chris Ferguson	£87,640	
8–10 November 2012	(England) UKIPT Bristol £770	550	£373,450	(Austria) Wojtek Barzantny	£90,400	
17–21 January 2013	(Scotland) UKIPT Edinburgh £770	612	£415,548	(Brazil) Nicolau Villa-Lobos	£101,000	
14–18 February 2013	(Republic of Ireland) UKIPT Cork €770	387	€262,773	(Republic of Ireland) Thomas Finneran	€55,440	
5–10 March 2013	(England) EPT/UKIPT London £770	1,099	£746,221	(Spain) Sergio Aido	£144,555	

- United Kingdom & Ireland Poker Tour - Season 3 - Leaderboard Champion: (England) Tom Hall, He earns a free ticket to every UKIPT event in season 4 for his efforts
- All champions of the UKIPT Season 3 main events, won a seat in the Sit´n´go Champion of Champions on March 11, 2013
- Champion of Champions UKIPT Season 3 Winner: (Wales) Richard Evans. For his efforts he won a seat to every stop of UKIPT Season 4 main events..

== Season 4 ==
Date	Event / City	Players	Prize Pool	Winner	Prize	Results
12–14 April 2013	(England) UKIPT London £275 Series 1	343	£83,177	(England) Jake Cody	£19,400	
12–16 June 2013	(Spain) UKIPT/ESPT Marbella €1,100	763	€732,480	(Scotland) Ludovic Geilich	€130,000	
28–30 June 2013	(England) UKIPT London £275 Series 2	478	£115,915	(Romania) Gabriel Dragomier	£16,480	
8–12 August 2013	(Republic of Ireland) UKIPT Galway €1,100	860	€970,000	(Scotland) Alan Gold	€187,494	
27–29 September 2013	(England) UKIPT London £275 Series 3	464	£112,520	(Vietnam) Dinh Nguyen	£15,348	
2–6 October 2013	(England) EPT/UKIPT London £1,100	747	£724,590	(Scotland) Robbie Bull	£113,405	
31 Oct-4 Nov, 2013	(Isle of Man) UKIPT Douglas £1,100	379	£485,000	(England) Duncan McLellan	£94,090	
27 Nov-2 Dec, 2013	(England) UKIPT Nottingham £1,100	458	£500,000	(England) Ben Mayhew	£72,840	
16–20 January 2014	(Scotland) UKIPT Edinburgh £1,100	427	£485,000	(Scotland) Dean Hutchison	£93,900	
27 Feb-3 Mar, 2014	(Republic of Ireland) UKIPT Dublin €770	682	€463,078	(Republic of Ireland) Kevin Killeen	€87,700	
11–13 April 2014	(England) UKIPT London £275 Series 4	313	£75,905	(England) Thomas Postlethwaite	£14,790	
30 April-4 May 2014	(England) UKIPT London £250 Deepstack	886	£221,500	(England) Jiri Sladkovsky	£23,000	
7–12 May 2014	(England) UKIPT Nottingham £1,100 £1,000,000 Guaranteed	1,223	£1,223,000	(England) Duncan McLellan	£202,372	
23–25 May 2014	(England) UKIPT London £275 Series 5 PLO	72	£17,640	(England) Martins Adeniya	£4,800	
11–15 June 2014	(Spain) UKIPT/ESPT Marbella €1,100	750	€720,000	(Spain) Rodrigo Espinosa	€136,000	
12–14 September 2014	(England) UKIPT London £275 Series 6	353	£86,330	(England) Paul Findlay	£12,396	
2–6 October 2014	(Isle of Man) UKIPT Douglas £770	402	£339,500	(England) Joshua Hart	£57,484	
8–12 October 2014	(England) EPT/UKIPT London £770	1,089	£739,431	(England) Brett Angell	£115,083	

- United Kingdom & Ireland Poker Tour - Season 4 - Leaderboard Champion: (Republic of Ireland) Daragh Davey, He earns a free ticket to every UKIPT event in season 5 for his efforts
- All champions of the UKIPT Season 4 main events, won a seat in the Sit´n´go Champion of Champions
- Champion of Champions UKIPT Season 4 Winner: (Scotland) Dean Hutchison. For his efforts he won a seat and accommodationsto every stop of UKIPT Season 5 main events..

== Season 5 ==
Date	Event / City	Players	Prize Pool	Winner	Prize	Results
20–25 January 2015	(England) UKIPT London £770	742	£503,818	(England) Rapinder Cheema	£78,825	
27 March 2015	(England) UKIPT London £275 Series 1	160	£38,800	(England) Christopher Yong	£10,986	
13–20 April 2015	(England) UKIPT Nottingham £1,100	1,026	£1,000,000	(England) Sam Mitten-Laurence	£182,000	
29 May 2015	(England) UKIPT London £275 Series 2	250	£60,625	(Italy) Giovanni Canali	£12,820	
11–21 June 2015	(Spain) UKIPT/ESPT Marbella €1,100	841	€807,360	(Spain) Isidoro Barrena	€150,800	
6–9 August 2015	(England) UKIPT Bristol £770	446	£302,834	(Belgium) Pierrick Tallon	£53,000	
1–4 October 2015	(Isle of Man) UKIPT Douglas £440	423	£135,412	(England) Daniel Stacey	£24,170	
15–18 October 2015	(England) UKIPT London £550 Super Series	291	£141,135	(England) Dale Garrad	£28,300	
19–22 November 2015	(Scotland) UKIPT Edinburgh £770	377	£255,983	(Spain) David Gomez Morante	£49,660	
29–31 January 2016	(England) UKIPT London £275 Series 3	351	£87,750	(England) Elliott Panyi	£16,590	
10–14 February 2016	(Republic of Ireland) EPT/UKIPT Dublin €1,100	1,002	€971,940	(Lithuania) Vladas Tamasauskas	€176,900	

- United Kingdom & Ireland Poker Tour - Season 5 - Leaderboard GOLD Champion: (Republic of Ireland) Daragh Davey
- United Kingdom & Ireland Poker Tour - Season 5 - Leaderboard SILVER Champion: Otto Castle

How it works? Player of the Year: the Silver tier will award points for all events with a buy-in of $600 and lower; and the Gold tier will count all other events across the EUREKA Festivals, no matter the buy-in.

== Season 6 ==
Date	Event / City	Players	Prize Pool	Winner	Prize	Results
6–10 April 2016	(England) UKIPT London £770	649	£454,300	(England) Usman Siddique	££84,100	
15–19 June 2016	(Spain) UKIPT/ESPT Marbella €1,100	844	€810,240	(England) Jonathan Schuman	€96,159	
21–24 July 2016	(England) UKIPT/FPS Lille €1,100	726	£696,960	(France) Fabrice Casano	£121,000	
1–4 September 2016	(England) UKIPT London £550 Super Series	453	£219,705	(Norway) Stian Knutsen	£42,500	
6–9 October 2016	(England) UKIPT Birmingham £770	244	£165,676	(England) Ted Spivack	£35,000	
18–20 November 2016	(England) UKIPT London £275 Series	379	£91,907	(England) Levon Jabourian	£17,120	

- United Kingdom & Ireland Poker Tour - Season 6 - Leaderboard GOLD Champion: (Italy) Gianluca Speranza
- United Kingdom & Ireland Poker Tour - Season 6 - Leaderboard SILVER Champion: (Norway) Stian Knutsen

How it works? Player of the Year: the Silver tier will award points for all events with a buy-in of $600 and lower; and the Gold tier will count all other events across the EUREKA Festivals, no matter the buy-in.

== Season 2022 ==
Date	Event / City	Players	Prize Pool	Winner	Prize	Results
1–10 April 2022	(England) UKIPT London £1,100	645	£619,200	(England) James Rann	£86,569	
16–22 May 2022	(Republic of Ireland) UKIPT Dublin €1,100	320	€269,660	(Scotland) Niall Farrell	€54,940	
22–26 June 2022	UKIPT/ESPT Malta €1,100; Summer Poker Festival	815	€782,400	(Bulgaria) Zlatin Penev	€144,630	
28–31 July 2022	(England) UKIPT Nottingham £1,100 £500,000 Guaranteed	582	£582,000	(England) Adam Maxwell	£98,150	
18–22 October 2022	(England) EPT/UKIPT London £1,100	1,458	£1,399,680	(Sweden) Martin Jacobson	£232,300	

== Season 2023 ==
Date	Event / City	Players	Prize Pool	Winner	Prize	Results
28 June-2 July 2023	UKIPT Malta €1,100; PokerStars Summer Festival	916	€916,000	(Italy) Simone Andrian	€153,610	
13–16 July 2023	(England) UKIPT Blackpool £1,100	268	£258,990	(England) Tuan Le	£53,630	
7–10 September 2023	(Republic of Ireland) UKIPT Brighton £1,100	354	£337,920	(England) Ben Spragg	£69,120	
21–24 September 2023	(England) UKIPT London £1,100	374	£359,040	(England) Dylan Bradley	£71,650	
26–29 October 2023	(Scotland) UKIPT Edinburgh £1,100	220	£211,200	(Republic of Ireland) Fintan Hand	£44,200	
5–13 November 2023	(England) UKIPT Nottingham £1,100 Grand Final £1,000,000 Guaranteed	1,227	£1,177,920	(France) Vincent Meli	£159,325	

- United Kingdom & Ireland Poker Tour - Season 2023 - Leaderboard Champion: (Scotland) David Docherty, he pick up the first prize of £15,000 package for the UKIPT 2024 season.

== Season 2024 ==
Date	Event / City	Players	Prize Pool	Winner	Prize	Results
10–16 June	(Spain) UKIPT/ESPT Málaga €1,100; Casino Torrequebrada, Málaga	1,146	€1,100,160	(Spain) Artus Giménez	€145,000	
3–11 August	(England) UKIPT London £1,100; The Hippodrome Casino, London	725	£696,000	(Italy) Gaspare Sposato	£107,660	
8–18 November	(England) UKIPT Nottingham £1,100 £1,000,000 Guaranteed; Dusk Till Dawn (casino), Nottingham	1,282	£1,230,720	(Iran) Arian Hassankashani	£201,900	
Sponsored Events
26 March-1 April	(Republic of Ireland) Irish Poker Open 2024 €1,150 €1,000,000 Guaranteed; Royal Dublin Society, Dublin	3,233	€3,152,175	(Finland) Tero Laurila	€292,735*	
21–24 November	(England) Women's Winter Festival £400 €100,000 Guaranteed; The Hippodrome Casino, London	271	£100,000	(Argentina) Maria Lampropulos	£20,000	

- United Kingdom & Ireland Poker Tour - Season 2024 - Leaderboard Champion: (Spain) Alejandro “Alex” Romero, he pick up the first prize of £15,000 package for the UKIPT 2025 season.

== UKIPT Grand Final ==
The 2010 UKIPT Grand Final, which doubled as the EPT London, was the largest ever tournament in the UK, attracting 848 entrants. This event also hosted a Tournament of Champions, with each of the nine regional leg winners competing for entry into all of the season 2 events. This tournament was also won by UKIPT London winner, David Vamplew.

== Winners by country ==
Place	Country	Times
1st	England	32
2nd	(Republic of Ireland) Ireland	9
3rd	Scotland	8
4th	Spain	5
5th	Belgium	2
	Canada	2
	France	2
	Italy	2
	Netherlands	2
10th	Austria	1
	Brazil	1
	Bulgaria	1
	Finland	1
	Germany	1
	Iran	1
	Lithuania	1
	Norway	1
	(Romania) Romenia	1
	Sweden	1
	(Vietnam) Vietnan	1
	Wales	1
Total		76

Up to Season 2024 UKIPT Nottingham / In case of a tie, it will be sorted alphabetically
