= Power point (disambiguation) =

PowerPoint is a presentation software program by Microsoft Corporation.

PowerPoint, Power Point, or Powerpoint may also refer to the following:

- Slide shows in general
- AC power plugs and sockets
- Power Points, in the Pokémon media franchise
- Magic point, in role playing games
- PowerPoint Ministries, the radio and television ministry of Prestonwood Baptist Church and Senior Pastor Jack Graham

== See also ==
- PPTS (disambiguation)
- PPT (disambiguation)
