= Sam Stein =

American poker player (born 1988)

- Nickname(s): KingKobeMVP (PokerStars & Ultimate Bet)
- Born: January 11, 1988 (age 38); Calabasas, California, U.S.
World Series of Poker
- Bracelet(s): 1
- Final table(s): 7 (including unofficial)
- Money finish(es): 33
- Highest ITM Main Event finish: 46th, 2023
World Poker Tour
- Final table(s): 2
- Money finish(es): 6
European Poker Tour
- Final table(s): 1
- Money finish(es): 1
North American Poker Tour
- Title(s): None
- Final table(s): 3
- Information last updated on 4 January 2025

Samuel Stein (born January 11, 1988) is an American high-stakes poker player from Los Angeles who lives in Henderson, Nevada. He won his first World Series of Poker bracelet at the 2011 World Series of Poker where he made two final tables and three in the money finishes. In both the 2010 and 2011 World Series of Poker, he finished in the money in two $10,000 Championship events, with one of them being the Pot Limit Texas hold 'em championship event each year. Of his nine World Series of Poker (WSOP) cashes, his last five are in pot limit events.

Stein has several second-place finishes in big tournaments. One of the more memorable ones was when Jason Mercier rivered him twice in a row at the April 13, 2010, 35-player $25,000 NAPT Mohegan Sun High Roller Bounty Shootout during a four-hour heads up final. His largest live game prize was a $1 million payout for a 4th-place finish in the 1560-player 2011 PokerStars Caribbean Adventure $10,000 main event.

He was listed as one of the best bets to win his first WSOP bracelet in 2010. He finished in the money three times, but did not win (get a bracelet) until 2011. The closest was a 10th-place finish in the 268-player 2010 $10,000 Pot-Limit Hold'em Championship Event 38 where he earned a prize of $44,010.

Stein is known for his online poker ID of KingKobeMVP. He has several large field wins in online play including January 19, 2011 Absolute Poker $1000+50 NL Hold'em against a field of 230 players for a prize of $47,725; November 24, 2009 PokerStars The Super Tuesday [$250,000 guaranteed] $1000+50 NL Hold'em against a field of 317 players for a prize of $64,827; and his highest online payout in the March 29, 2009, PokerStars Sunday 500 [$500,000 guaranteed] $500+30 NL Hold'em against a field of 986 players for a prize of $91,250.

== World Series of Poker ==
His first WSOP cash was a 73rd-place finish in the 2009 1,459-player $1,500 No-Limit Hold’em / Six Handed Event 9 for a prize of $4,062. His first WSOP final table was a 3rd-place finish at the 2011 249-player $10,000 Pot-Limit Hold'em Championship Event 16 for a prize of $264,651. His first bracelet came at the 685-player $3,000 Pot-Limit Omaha Event 31 when he won a prize of $420,802.

World Series of Poker bracelets
Year	Tournament	Prize (US$)
2011	$3,000 Pot Limit Omaha	$420,802

World Series of Poker results
Year	Cashes	Final Tables	Bracelets
2009	1		
2010	3		
2010 E	1		
2011	5	2	1
2012	5		
2013	2		
2014	2	1	
2015	4	1	
2016	4		
2017	3		
2018	3		
