= PokerStars Festival =

Global poker tournament

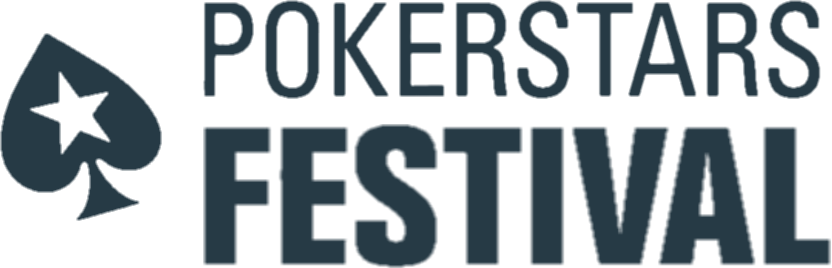
- Sport: Texas Hold 'em
- Founded: 2016
- Folded: 2018

The PokerStars Festival was a series of global poker tournaments which began in 2016. The formation of the series was announced in August 2016, when PokerStars revealed that the European Poker Tour and other poker tours were being rebranded. Thirteen tournament festivals were played in the inaugural season, in the North America, Europe, South America and Asia. PokerStars also announced another series of tournaments, PokerStars Championship, which features higher buy-in events. The series was discontinued after the second season.

== PSF Main Event winners ==
=== Season 1 ===
Date	Event / City	Players	Prize Pool	Winner	Prize	Results
1–5 November 2016	(United States) PSF New Jersey US$1,100; Resorts Casino Hotel, Atlantic City, USA	208	$201,760	(United States) Jason Acosta	$38,220	
25–29 January 2017	(England) PSF London £990 (~US$1,237); PokerStars at The Hippodrome Casino, London, UK	944	£824,112 (~US$1,030,037)	(England) Rehman Kassam	£89,320 (~US$111,638)	
9–13 March 2017	PSF Rozvadov €1,100 (~US$1,161); King's Casino, Rozvadov, Czech Republic	1,126	€1,089,310 (~US$1,150,080)	(Czech Republic) Petr Svoboda	€124,346 (~US$131,283)	
23–27 May 2017	PSF Chile US$1,650; Viña del Mar Casino, Viña del Mar, Chile	329	US$500,000	(Chile) Christopher Franco	US$97,360	
21–25 June 2017	PSF Marbella €1,100 (~US$1,226); Casino Marbella, Marbella, Spain	949	€911,040 (~US$1,015,358)	(Spain) Ignacio De Maturana	€152,000 (~US$169,404)	
20–23 July 2017	PSF Lille €1,100 (~US$1,268); Hotel Casino Barrière de Lille, France	800	€768,000 (~US$885,343)	(France) Philippe Le-Touche	€143,000 (~US$164,849)	
20–24 July 2017	PSF Korea ₩1,650,000 (~US$1,468); Paradise Hotel & Resort, Incheon, South Korea	285	₩414,675,000 (~US$368,902)	(South Korea) Tae Hoon Han	₩83,130,000 (~US$73,954)	
2–6 August 2017	PSF Bucharest €1,100 (~US$1,299); JW Marriott Grand Hotel, Bucharest, Romania	736	€706,560 (~US$834,763)	(England) Sam Grafton	€117,707 (~US$139,050)	
3–7 August 2017	PSF Manila ₱55,000 (~US$1,090); City of Dreams, Manila, Philippines	594	₱28,809,000 (~US$571,420)	(India) Uday Bansal	₱4,676,000 (~US$92,747)	
19–23 September 2017	PSF Uruguay US$1,650; Enjoy Punta del Este, Punta del Este, Uruguay	261	US$379,755	(Argentina) Julio Belluscio	US$66,748	
28 September–1 October 2017	(Republic of Ireland) PSF Dublin €1,100 (~US$1,293); Regency Airport Hotel, Dublin, Ireland	544	€679,000 (~US$798,204)	(Republic of Ireland) Gary McGinty	€91,808 (~US$107,925)	
19–22 October 2017	PSF Sochi ₽66,000 (~US$1,150); Sochi Casino and Resort, Sochi, Russia	699	₽40,681,800 (~US$798,204)	(Russia) Aleksandr Merzhvinskii	₽7,700,000 (~US$134,163)	
22–26 November 2017	PSF Hamburg €1,100 (~US$1,291); Spielbank Schenefeld, Hamburg, Germany	567	€549,990 (~US$645,445)	(Germany) Ulrich Pauls	€105,850 (~US$124,221)	

=== Season 2 ===
Date	Event / City	Players	Prize Pool	Winner	Prize	Results
24–28 January 2018	(England) PSF London £990 (~US$1,384); PokerStars at The Hippodrome Casino, London, UK	852	£743,796 (~US$1,039,576)	(France) Kalidou Sow	£121,803 (~US$170,239)	
6–10 June 2018	PSF Marbella €1,100 (~US$1,286); Casino Marbella, Marbella, Spain	1,047	€985,920 (~US$1,153,204)	(Spain) Omar Del Pino	€179,000 (~US$209,371)	
19–22 July 2018	PSF Lille €1,100 (~US$1,280); Hotel Casino Barrière de Lille, France	859	€824,640 (~US$959,799)	(France) Alexandre de Zutter	€143,000 (~US$164,849)	

== Season 1 Results ==
=== (United States) PSF New Jersey ===
- Venue: Resorts Casino Hotel, Atlantic City, USA
- Buy-in: $1,100
- 5-Day Event: 1–5 November 2016
- Number of buy-ins: 208
- Total Prize Pool: $201,760
- Number of Payouts: 39

Final table
Place	Name	Prize
1st	(United States) Jason Acosta	$38,220
2nd	(United States) Michael Gagliano	$28,116
3rd	(United States) Eli Kim	$20,683
4th	(United States) David Johnston	$15,215
5th	(United States) Matthew Affleck	$11,193
6th	(United States) Sridhar Sangannagari	$8,234
7th	(United States) Rocco Dicondina	$6,057
8th	(England) Peter Smyth	$4,455

=== (England) PSF London ===
- Venue: PokerStars at The Hippodrome Casino, London, UK
- Buy-in: £990 (~US$1,237)
- 5-Day Event: 25–29 January 2017
- Number of buy-ins: 944
- Total Prize Pool: £824,112 (~US$1,030,037)
- Number of Payouts: 183

Final table
Place	Name	Prize
1st	(England) Rehman Kassam	£89,320* (~US$111,638)
2nd	(England) Daniel Harwood	£95,000* (~US$$118,738)
3rd	(Australia) Eric Cech	£70,000* (~US$87,491)
4th	(Republic of Ireland) Yuriy Boyko	£43,370 (~US$54,207)
5th	(France) Clément Tripodi	£31,510 (~US$31,510)
6th	(Scotland) Ludovic Geilich	£22,950 (~US$28,684)
7th	(France) Alexis Fleur	£16,702 (~US$20,875)
8th	(England) Lam Van Trinh	£12,150 (~US$15,185)

* Deal between the final three players.

=== (Czech Republic) PSF Rozvadov ===
- Venue: King's Casino, Rozvadov, Czech Republic
- Buy-in: €1,100 (~US$1,161)
- 5-Day Event: 9–13 March 2017
- Number of buy-ins: 1,126
- Guaranteed Prize Pool: €500,000 (~US$527,894)
- Total Prize Pool: €1,089,310 (~US$1,150,080)
- Number of Payouts: 215

Final table
Place	Name	Prize
1st	(Czech Republic) Petr Svoboda	€124,346 (~US$131,283)
2nd	(Poland) Michal Lubas	€91,000 (~US$96,077)
3rd	(Slovakia) Stanislav Koleno	€87,444 (~US$92,322)
4th	(Germany) Michael Rohde	€78,966 (~US$83,371)
5th	(Belgium) Cenk Oguz	€39,078 (~US$41,258)
6th	(Slovakia) Marian Flesar	€28,086 (~US$29,653)
7th	(Hungary) Péter Kamarás	€20,186 (~US$21,312)
8th	(Czech Republic) Jan Stariat	€14,508 (~US$15,317)

=== PSF Chile ===
- Venue: Viña del Mar Casino, Viña del Mar, Chile
- Buy-in: $1,650
- 5-Day Event: 23–27 May 2017
- Number of buy-ins: 329
- Guaranteed Prize Pool: $500,000
- Total Prize Pool: $500,000
- Number of Payouts: 47

Final table
Place	Name	Prize
1st	(Chile) Christopher Franco	$97,360
2nd	(Colombia) Juan Giraldo	$61,900
3rd	(Argentina) Sergio Tello	$46,400
4th	(Chile) Andrés Vega	$37,560
5th	(Chile) Amos Ben Haim	$29,600
6th	(Chile) Rodrigo Zambra	$22,600
7th	(Argentina) Oscar Tolosa	$16,600
8th	(Chile) Diego Lizana	$12,200

=== (Spain) PSF Marbella ===
- Venue: Casino Marbella, Marbella, Spain
- Buy-in: €1,100 (~US$1,226)
- 5-Day Event: 21–25 June 2017
- Number of buy-ins: 949
- Total Prize Pool: €911,040 (~US$1,015,358)
- Number of Payouts: 135

Final table
Place	Name	Prize
1st	(Spain) Ignacio De Maturana	€152.000* (~US$169,404)
2nd	(Spain) Íñigo Naveiro	€95.500* (~US$106,434)
3rd	(Spain) Leo Margets	€95.500* (~US$106,434)
4th	(Spain) Fernando Gonzalez	€54,100 (~US$60,295)
5th	(Spain) Ignacio Barcenas Romera	€42,100 (~US$46,921)
6th	(Spain) Jose Fibla	€31,200 (~US$34,773)
7th	(England) Fabrizio Privitera	€22,300 (~US$24,853)
8th	(Switzerland) Marco Lander	€15,900 (~US$17,721)

* Deal between the final three players.

=== (France) PSF Lille ===
- Venue: Hotel Casino Barrière de Lille, France
- Buy-in: €1,100 (~US$1,268)
- 4-Day Event: 20–23 July 2017
- Number of buy-ins: 800
- Total Prize Pool: €768,000 (~US$885,343)
- Number of Payouts: 119

Final table
Place	Name	Prize
1st	(France) Philippe Le-Touche	€143,000 (~US$164,849)
2nd	(France) Kim Amanton	€88,000 (~US$101,445)
3rd	(France) Jonathan Amasse	€62,200 (~US$71,703)
4th	(France) Jean-Marie Piette	€46,390 (~US$53,477)
5th	(England) Paul Bahbout	€36,590 (~US$42,180)
6th	(Norway) Oystein Nordli	€27,460 (~US$31,655)
7th	(Belgium) Fabrice Halleux	€19,550 (~US$22,537)
8th	(France) Florent Lusardi	€13,600 (~US$15,677)

=== (South Korea) PSF Korea ===
- Venue: Paradise Hotel & Resort, Incheon, South Korea
- Buy-in: ₩1,650,000 (~US$1,468)
- 5-Day Event: 20–24 July 2017
- Number of buy-ins: 285
- Total Prize Pool: ₩414,675,000 (~US$368,902)
- Number of Payouts: 39

Final table
Place	Name	Prize
1st	(South Korea) Tae Hoon Han	₩83,130,000 (~US$73,954)
2nd	(Japan) Yuki Ko	₩55,280,000 (~US$49,178)
3rd	(Taiwan) Wei Kuo Hsiao	₩40,430,000 (~US$35,967)
4th	(Japan) Sano Mitsuru	₩32,635,000 (~US$29,033)
5th	(Japan) Kojima Harunobu	₩25,600,000 (~US$22,774)
6th	(United States) Scott Janik	₩19,400,000 (~US$17,259)
7th	(China) Jwah Kim	₩14,220,000 (~US$12,650)
8th	(Japan) Dmitrii Kovalevskii	₩10,450,000 (~US$9,296)

=== (Romania) PSF Bucharest ===
- Venue: JW Marriott Grand Hotel, Bucharest, Romania
- Buy-in: €1,100 (~US$1,299)
- 5-Day Event: 2–6 August 2017
- Number of buy-ins: 736
- Guaranteed Prize Pool: €500,000 (~US$590,723)
- Total Prize Pool: €706,560 (~US$834,763)
- Number of Payouts: 111

Final table
Place	Name	Prize
1st	(England) Sam Grafton	€117,707 (~US$139,050)
2nd	(Turkey) Anil Ozdemir	€96,993 (~US$114,592)
3rd	(Poland) Daniel Nietrzebka	€57,600 (~US$68,051)
4th	(Bulgaria) Fahredin Mustafov	€43,500 (~US$51,392)
5th	(France) Patrick Bueno	€34,400 (~US$40,641)
6th	(France) Johann Eclapier	€26,091 (~US$30,825)
7th	(Romania) Traian Bostan	€18,720 (~US$22,116)
8th	(Ukraine) Yuri Kudrinsky	€12,790 (~US$15,110)

=== (Philippines) PSF Manila ===
- Venue: City of Dreams, Manila, Philippines
- Buy-in: ₱55,000 (~US$1,090)
- 5-Day Event: 3–7 August 2017
- Number of buy-ins: 594
- Guaranteed Prize Pool: ₱20,000,000 (~US$396,695)
- Total Prize Pool: ₱28,809,000 (~US$571,420)
- Number of Payouts: 87

Final table
Place	Name	Prize
1st	(India) Uday Bansal	₱4,676,000 (~US$92,747)
2nd	(Finland) Antti Halme	₱4,273,000 (~US$84,753)
3rd	(Denmark) Michael Falcon	₱2,456,000 (~US$48,714)
4th	(Philippines) Mike Takayama	₱1,900,000 (~US$37,686)
5th	(South Korea) Jaehyun Lim	₱1,500,000 (~US$29,752)
6th	(England) Sam Razavi	₱1,170,000 (~US$23,206)
7th	(Australia) Kenneth Buck	₱870,000 (~US$17,256)
8th	(Vietnam) Hoa Nguyen	₱596,000 (~US$11,821)

=== PSF Uruguay ===
- Venue: Enjoy Punta del Este, Punta del Este, Uruguay
- Buy-in: $1,650
- 5-Day Event: 19–23 September 2017
- Number of buy-ins: 261
- Total Prize Pool: $379,755
- Number of Payouts: 39

Final table
Place	Name	Prize
1st	(Argentina) Julio Belluscio	$66,748*
2nd	(Uruguay) Julio Arocena	$60,027*
3rd	(Argentina) Hector Barua	$37,020
4th	(Argentina) Ernesto Panno	$29,880
5th	(Brazil) Osvaldo Naves	$23,440
6th	(Argentina) Juan Perez	$17,740
7th	(Uruguay) Alejandro García	$13,020
8th	(Brazil) Renan Toniolo	$9,560

* Deal between the final two players.

=== (Republic of Ireland) PSF Dublin ===
- Venue: Regency Airport Hotel, Dublin, Ireland
- Buy-in: €1,100 (~US$1,293)
- 5-Day Event: 28 September – 1 October 2017
- Number of buy-ins: 544
- Guaranteed Prize Pool: €700,000 (~US$822,890)
- Total Prize Pool: €679,000 (~US$798,204)
- Number of Payouts: 79

Final table
Place	Name	Prize
1st	(Republic of Ireland) Gary McGinty	€91,808* (~US$107,925)
2nd	(Republic of Ireland) James O'Callaghan	€74,797* (~US$87,928)
3rd	(Italy) Antonio Merone	€78,554* (~US$92,344)
4th	(Republic of Ireland) Sean Prendiville	€71,161* (~US$83,653)
5th	(Italy) Ivan Tononi	€35,780 (~US$42,061)
6th	(Republic of Ireland) Declan Connolly	€28,110 (~US$33,044)
7th	(Republic of Ireland) Michael Graydon	€20,980 (~US$24,663)
8th	(England) Alexander Bretherton	€14,530 (~US$17,080)

* Deal between the final four players.

=== (Russia) PSF Sochi ===
- Venue: Sochi Casino and Resort, Sochi, Russia
- Buy-in: ₽66,000 (~US$1,150)
- 5-Day Event: 19–22 October 2017
- Number of buy-ins: 699
- Guaranteed Prize Pool: ₽30,000,000 (~US$522,714)
- Total Prize Pool: ₽40,681,800 (~US$708,831)
- Number of Payouts: 103

Final table
Place	Name	Prize
1st	(Russia) Aleksandr Merzhvinskii	₽7,700,000 (~US$134,163)
2nd	(Russia) Alexander Denisov	₽4,700,000 (~US$81,892)
3rd	(Belarus) Nikita Myshkin	₽3,350,000 (~US$58,370)
4th	(Russia) Alexander Shlyakhov	₽2,600,000 (~US$45,302)
5th	(Russia) Valentin Zolotilov	₽2,000,000 (~US$34,848)
6th	(Russia) Andrey Kotelnikov	₽1,560,000 (~US$27,181)
7th	(Russia) Mikhail Zamyatin	₽1,101,800 (~US$19,198)
8th	(Belarus) Kirill Denisenko	₽770,000 (~US$13,416)

=== (Germany) PSF Hamburg ===
- Venue: Spielbank Schenefeld, Hamburg, Germany
- Buy-in: €1,100 (~US$1,291)
- 5-Day Event: 22–26 November 2017
- Number of buy-ins: 567
- Guaranteed Prize Pool: €500,000 (~US$586,779)
- Total Prize Pool: €549,990 (~US$645,445)
- Number of Payouts: 79

Final table
Place	Name	Prize
1st	(Germany) Ulrich Pauls	€105,850 (~US$124,221)
2nd	(Poland) Michal Lubas	€66,220 (~US$77,713)
3rd	(Germany) Jan Sigel	€47,410 (~US$55,638)
4th	(Germany) Behzad Zarnegar	€36,960 (~US$43,375)
5th	(Sweden) Stefan Rundstrom	€28,980 (~US$34,010)
6th	(Romania) Andrei Nodea	€22,770 (~US$26,722)
7th	(Lithuania) Karolis Domarkas	€16,990 (~US$19,939)
8th	(Poland) Marcin Horecki	€11,770 (~US$13,813)

== Season 2 Results ==
=== (England) PSF London ===
- Venue: PokerStars at The Hippodrome Casino, London, UK
- Buy-in: £990 (~US$1,384)
- 5-Day Event: 24–28 January 2018
- Number of buy-ins: 852
- Total Prize Pool: £743,796 (~US$1,039,576)
- Number of Payouts: 127

Final table
Place	Name	Prize
1st	(France) Kalidou Sow	£121,803* (~US$170,239)
2nd	(England) Paul Dando	£103,197* (~US$$144,234)
3rd	(England) David Mander	£60,000 (~US$83,859)
4th	(England) Tom Winstone	£45,000 (~US$62,894)
5th	(England) Waheed Ashraf	£35,500 (~US$49,617)
6th	(England) Attila Farkas	£26,600 (~US$37,177)
7th	(England) Thomas Harbrecht-Parker	£18,500 (~US$25,856)
8th	(England) Tsz Ho	£13,000 (~US$18,169)

* Deal between the final two players.

=== (Spain) PSF Marbella ===
- Venue: Casino Marbella, Marbella, Spain
- Buy-in: €1,100 (~US$1,286)
- 5-Day Event: 6–10 June 2018
- Number of buy-ins: 1,047
- Total Prize Pool: €985,920 (~US$1,153,204)
- Number of Payouts: 154

Final table
Place	Name	Prize
1st	(Spain) Cesar Omar Del Pino Hanouadi	€179,000 (~US$209,371)
2nd	(Spain) Romain Feriolo	€107,500 (~US$125,739)
3rd	(Norway) Ole Hansen	€76,000 (~US$88,895)
4th	(Spain) Iñigo Naveiro	€57,000 (~US$66,671)
5th	(Lithuania) Thomas Saltonas	€44,000 (~US$51,465)
6th	(Netherlands) Zhong Chen	€32,000 (~US$37,429)
7th	(Netherlands) Teunis Kooij	€23,500 (~US$27,487)
8th	(Netherlands) Paul van Oort	€17,000 (~US$19,884)

=== (France) PSF Lille ===
- Venue: Hotel Casino Barrière de Lille, France
- Buy-in: €1,100 (~US$1,280)
- 4-Day Event: 19–22 July 2018
- Number of buy-ins: 859
- Total Prize Pool: €824,640 (~US$959,799)
- Number of Payouts: 127

Final table
Place	Name	Prize
1st	(France) Alexandre de Zutter	€154,000 (~US$179,240)
2nd	(Belgium) Yannick Ansenne	€93,480 (~US$108,801)
3rd	(France) Ugo Faggioli	€65,950 (~US$76,759)
4th	(Singapore) Alex Peck	€49,440 (~US$57,543)
5th	(France) Tom De Boom	€38,980 (~US$45,368)
6th	(Belgium) Samir Akhoullou	€29,160 (~US$33,939)
7th	(France) Gino Cardenia	€20,540 (~US$23,906)
8th	(France) Pierre Antona	€14,430 (~US$16,795)

== Future ==
On December 15, 2017, PokerStars announced that it will bring back regional tour brands in 2018. These include the European Poker Tour, Asia Pacific Poker Tour (APPT), and Latin American Poker Tour (LAPT). Therefore, the PokerStars Festival label will no longer be used.
