= North American Poker Tour season 3 =

NAPT Season 3
- League: North American Poker Tour
- Sport: Texas Hold 'em
- Duration: November 6, 2023 – November 12, 2023

NAPT seasons
- ← Season 2 Season 4 →

Below are the results for season 3 of the North American Poker Tour (NAPT).

== Results ==
=== (United States) NAPT Las Vegas ===
- Casino: Resorts World, Las Vegas, United States
- Buy-in: $1,500 + $150
- 6-Day Event: November 6, 2023 to November 11, 2023
- Number of buy-ins: 1,095
- Total Prize Pool: $1,609,650
- Number of Payouts: 159
- Official Results: The Hendom Mob

Final Table
Place	Name	Prize
1st	(United States) Sami Bechahed	$268,945
2nd	(United States) Jonathan Borenstein	$168,175
3rd	(United States) David Coleman	$120,130
4th	(United States) Ping Liu	$92,410
5th	(Spain) Sergio Aido	$71,080
6th	(United States) Nick Schulman	$54,680
7th	(United States) Sandeep Pallampati	$42,060
8th	(United States) Anthony Dianaty	$32,355

=== (United States) NAPT Las Vegas Super High Roller ===
- Casino: Resorts World, Las Vegas, United States
- Buy-in: $10,000 + $300
- 3-Day Event: November 5, 2023 to November 7, 2023
- Number of buy-ins: 59
- Total Prize Pool: $572,300
- Number of Payouts: 8
- Official Results: The Hendom Mob

Final Table
Place	Name	Prize
1st	(United States) Jesse Lonis	$174,550
2nd	(United States) David Stamm	$114,460
3rd	(Spain) Sergio Aido	$82,985
4th	(United States) Richard Green	$62,955
5th	(United States) Sam Soverel	$48,645
6th	(United States) James Collopy	$37,200
7th	(United States) John Morgan	$28,615
8th	(United States) Shannon Shorr	$22,890

=== (United States) NAPT Las Vegas High Roller ===
- Casino: Resorts World, Las Vegas, United States
- Buy-in: $5,000 + $300
- 3-Day Event: November 10, 2023 to November 12, 2023
- Number of buy-ins: 150
- Total Prize Pool: $727,500
- Number of Payouts: 20
- Official Results: The Hendom Mob

Final Table
Place	Name	Prize
1st	(United States) Samuel Laskowitz	$180,850
2nd	(United States) Shannon Shorr	$113,030
3rd	(United States) Jesse Lonis	$80,740
4th	(United States) John Riordan	$62,105
5th	(United States) John Andress	$47,770
6th	(United States) Alexander Condon	$36,745
7th	(United States) Nadya Magnus	$28,265
8th	(United States) Luke Graham	$23,470
