= Joseph Tehan =

American poker player

- Nickname: Joe
- Born: September 15; Utica, New York, U.S.

World Series of Poker
- Bracelet: None
- Money finishes: 30
- Highest WSOP Main Event finish: 185, 2011

World Poker Tour
- Title: 1
- Final table: 1
- Money finishes: 6

Joseph "Joe" Tehan (born September 15 in Utica, New York) is an American professional poker player.

Tehan was introduced to poker at college where he played with his friends. He started out playing low limits but soon began traveling to casinos to play at higher stakes. After completing his Masters in Business Administration he decided to move to Las Vegas and play poker professionally. Joe started out his poker career as a ring game player.

In June 2006, Tehan won the World Poker Tour fifth season Mandalay Bay Poker Championship, earning $1,033,440. On the final hand, Tehan's 9♣ 8♥ improved to a full house on a board of 10♠ 9♠ 9♥ A♦ 8♣ to defeat Burt Boutin's A♠ 10♣. Since his victory, Joe has switched to becoming primarily a poker tournament player.

In November 2010, Tehan won the North American Poker Tour Los Angeles $5,000 buy-in main event, earning $725,000. He knocked all seven other players at the final table, which included fellow poker professionals Jason Mercier and Michael Binger.

As of 2011, his total live earnings exceed $3,000,000.
