= PPTS =

PPTS may refer to:

- Palestine Pilgrims' Text Society, a Victorian academic society
- Pulsed plasma thrusters, a type of spacecraft propulsion
- Prospective Piloted Transport System, a Russian spacecraft
- Pyridinium p-toluenesulfonate, a chemical reagent
- Point perfect transcription services

== See also ==
- Power point (disambiguation)
