= Ashton Griffin =

American poker player (born 1989)

- Nickname: theASHMAN103
- Born: 1989 (age 36–37)

World Series of Poker
- Bracelet: None
- Final tables: 2
- Money finishes: 24
- Highest WSOP Main Event finish: 118th, 2013

World Poker Tour
- Money finishes: 2

Ashton Griffin (born 1989) is an American professional poker player from Florida.

== Poker career ==
Griffin begin playing online poker at the age of 14 and said he was a losing player until the age of 18. Griffin was known to have issues with bankroll management having gone from millionaire to broke many times before being able to build a bankroll.

In 2010, Griffin won the $25,000 High-Roller Shootout event on the North American Poker Tour for $560,000.

In 2013, Griffin won PokerStars 2013 SCOOP Event #40-L ($215 NLHE Heads-Up, High Roller) for $41,285.79.

Griffin is online cash game specialist having earned over $4,800,000 on Full Tilt Poker playing under the alias theASHMAN103.

As of 2024, his live tournament winnings exceed $1,200,000.

== Personal life ==
In 2011, Griffin won an ultramarathon prop bet against Haseeb Qureshi for $300,000 after running 70 miles in under 24 hours.
