= Partouche Poker Tour =

Series of poker tournaments

The Partouche Poker Tour (PPT) was a series of poker tournaments held at casinos owned and operated by the Partouche group in France. The tour operated on a three-tiered structure, with two levels of satellites eventually feeding into the Main Event held at the Palm Beach casino in Cannes.

Satellites with a €125 buy-in were held every Tuesday and Thursday from November to July, with winners earning a place in the next round of Super Satellites. Players could also have entered a Super Satellite directly for a €1,075 buy-in. Each of the six Super Satellites, held at a different Partouche casino, was limited to 500 entrants, with the top 50 finishers at each event earning entry to the Main Event.

The Main Event consisted of the 300 Super Satellite ticket winners, plus other players who pay the €8,500 buy-in. As of 2010, the Main Event was held in September, with the competitors playing until the nine-player final table is reached, at which point the tournament adjourns. In a format similar to that of the World Series of Poker Main Event, the final nine players returned in November to play until a champion was crowned.

In 2012, Patrick Partouche, CEO of the Partouche group, announced that the tour would not return in 2013.

== Main Event results ==
=== 2008 ===
Final Table
Place	Name	Prize
1st	(France) Alain Roy	€1,000,000
2nd	(Switzerland) Claudio Rinaldi	€511,100
3rd	(France) Antonin Teisseire	€335,000
4th	(France) Stephane Bazin	€225,500
5th	(France) Philippe Narboni	€156,500
6th	(France) Jean-Philippe Rohr	€123,000
7th	(France) Brice Cournut	€100,500
8th	(France) Michel Abécassis	€78,500
9th	(Denmark) Gus Hansen	€58,000

=== 2009 ===
Final Table
Place	Name	Prize
1st	(France) Jean-Paul Pasqualini	€1,000,000
2nd	(France) Cédric Rossi	€606,700
3rd	(Italy) Gianni Giaroni	€357,200
4th	(France) Michel Janvier	€262,400
5th	(Canada) Wesley Pantling	€211,800
6th	(France) Hassan Fares	€155,800
7th	(Sweden) Michael Tureniec	€133,600
8th	(Finland) Mika Puumalainen	€118,700
9th	(Finland) Henri Kettunen	€102,300

=== 2010 ===
Final Table
Place	Name	Prize
1st	(United States) Vanessa Selbst	€1,300,000
2nd	(France) Raphael Kroll	€800,000
3rd	(France) Fabrice Soulier	€500,000
4th	(Finland) Tommi Etelapera	€360,000
5th	(Egypt) Ibrahim Raouf	€300,000
6th	(Denmark) Soren Konsgaard	€240,000
7th	(France) Cyril André	€187,500
8th	(Germany) Tobias Reinkemeier	€130,700

One of the players who had made the final table, German player Ali Tekintamgac, was disqualified from the tournament for cheating. This was not the first time he had been caught cheating; earlier in 2010 at the European Poker Tour stop in Tallinn, he was found to have used colleagues posing as bloggers and journalists to signal his opponents' hole cards.

The 2010 main event also sparked a controversy, after the tournament staff was accused of making dubious rulings in favor of local players. Danish poker pro Mickey "mement_mori" Petersen and American poker pro Michael Binger reported a hand featuring a French and an Italian pro player Mustapha Kanit, whereupon the floorman ruled in favor of the French player even though he had thrown his hand into the muck.

=== 2011 ===
Final Table
Place	Name	Prize
1st	(United Kingdom) Samuel Trickett	€1,000,000
2nd	(Kuwait) Salman Behbehani	€600,000
3rd	(Ukraine) Oleksii Kovalchuk	€379,760
4th	(Israel) Ilan Boujenah	€300,000
5th	(France) Roger Hairabedian	€230,000
6th	(Italy) Mustapha Kanit	€190,000
7th	(Ukraine) Aleksander Dovzhenko	€160,000
8th	(France) Alexandre Coussy	€130,000
9th	(Denmark) Mads Wissing	€100,000

=== 2012 ===
Final Table
Place	Name	Prize
1st	(Germany) Ole Schemion	€1,172,850
2nd	(Russia) Karen Sarkisyan	€693,494
3rd	(Australia) Aaron Lim	€417,499
4th	(United States) Dan O'Brien	€341,991
5th	(Italy) Marcello Marigliano	€267,492
6th	(France) Fabrice Touil	€223,498
7th	(United States) Dan Smith	€178,496
8th	(Spain) Tomeu Gomila	€139,499
9th	(England) Tom Alner	€105,404
