= Estrellas Poker Tour =

Spanish annual poker tour

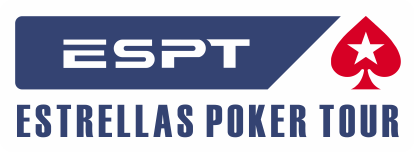
- Sport: Texas Hold 'em
- Founded: 2010
- Folded: 2024
- Replaced by: PokerStars Open
- Continent: Europe
- Last champion: (France) Sylvain Berthelot
- Sponsor: PokerStars
- Website: pokerstarslive.com

The Estrellas Poker Tour (ESPT) started in April 2010, is a major regional poker tour in the Spain. The ESPT is sponsored by PokerStars.com.

Discontinued: In 2024, PokerStars announced the new PokerStars Open that replaces the following tours: EKA (Eureka Poker Tour), UKIPT (UK and Ireland Poker Tour), FPS (France Poker Series) and ESPT (Estrellas Poker Tour), starting in March 2025.

== Season 1 ==
Date	Event / City	Entries	Prize Pool	Winner	Prize	Results
8–11 April 2010	(Spain) ESPT Málaga	261	€228,010	(Spain) Vedast Sanxis	€60,970	
27–30 May 2010	(Spain) ESPT Alicante	305	€266,448	(Spain) Jose Martinez	€70,148	
8–12 July 2010	(Spain) ESPT Madrid	291	€254,219	(Spain) Marc Colomé	€67,519	

- The 3 champions of the ESPT 2010 main events, Vedast, José and Marc gained tickets to EPT Barcelona 2010 (22nd to 27th November)
- Estrellas Poker Tour - Season 1 - 2010 Champion: (Spain) Alvaro Marino Nadal

== Season 2 ==
Date	Event / City	Entries	Prize Pool	Winner	Prize	Results
3–6 February 2011	(Spain) ESPT Madrid	498	€435,053	(Spain) Ricardo Escobar	€103,503	
31 Mar-3 Apr, 2011	(Spain) ESPT Málaga	375	€327,600	(Spain) Antonio Dieguez Rodriguez	€81,500	
26–29 May 2011	(Spain) ESPT Alicante	347	€303,140	(Spain) Alejandro Piñeiro Barcelo	€75,800	
4–7 August 2011	(Spain) ESPT San Sebastián	290	€253,344	(Germany) Fabian Deimann	€64,600	
21–25 September 2011	(Spain) ESPT Ibiza	426	€372,154	(Poland) Grzegorz Gosk	€92,100	

- Estrellas Poker Tour - Season 2 - 2011 Champion: (Spain) Álvaro Santamaria

== Season 3 ==
Date	Event / City	Entries	Prize Pool	Winner	Prize	Results
25–29 January 2012	(Spain) ESPT Madrid	482	€462,720	(Spain) Juan Miguel Tomé Perez	€70,619	
26 Mar-1 Apr, 2012	(Spain) ESPT Valencia	387	€371,520	(Spain) Miguel Angel Rodriguez Bermudez	€76,000	
14–20 May 2012	(Spain) ESPT Ibiza	269	€258,240	(Spain) Pablo Martinez Del Marmol	€40,800	
23–29 July 2012	(Spain) ESPT San Sebastián	269	€258,240	(Spain) Borja González Urteaga	€65,800	
15–19 August 2012	(Spain) EPT/ESPT Barcelona	1,037	€1,004,940	(Italy) Lorenzo Sabato	€200,000	

- Estrellas Poker Tour - Season 3 - 2012 Champion: (Spain) Jaume Niell Alomar

== Season 4 ==
Date	Event / City	Entries	Prize Pool	Winner	Prize	Results
25–29 January 2013	(Spain) ESPT Madrid	632	€606,720	(Spain) Adrian Mateos	€103,053	
31 Mar-3 Apr, 2013	(Spain) ESPT Valencia	483	€463,680	(Netherlands) Daniel Boender	€104,550	
26–29 May 2013	(Spain) UKIPT/ESPT Marbella	763	€732,480	(Scotland) Ludovic Geilich	€130,000	
4–7 August 2013	(Spain) EPT/ESPT Barcelona	1,798	€1,743,090	(Germany) Soenke Jahn	€169,136	

- Estrellas Poker Tour - Season 4 - 2013 Champion: (Spain) Jose Javier Patiño Gonzalez

== Season 5 ==
Date	Event / City	Entries	Prize Pool	Winner	Prize	Results
5–9 February 2014	(Spain) ESPT Madrid	721	€692,160	(Spain) Victor Jesus Antoraz Alvarez	€97,363	
2–6 April 2014	(Spain) ESPT Valencia	414	€397,440	(Germany) Fabio Sperling	€77,000	
11–15 June 2014	(Spain) UKIPT/ESPT Marbella Festival	750	€720,000	(Spain) Rodrigo Espinosa	€136,000	
16–21 August 2014	(Spain) EPT/ESPT Barcelona	2,560	€2,483,200	(Argentina) Matias Ruzzi	€198,550	

- Estrellas Poker Tour - Season 5 - 2014 Champion: (Germany) Heinz Traut

== Season 6 ==
Date	Event / City	Entries	Prize Pool	Winner	Prize	Results
9–15 March 2015	(Spain) ESPT Madrid	579	€552,000	(Denmark) Nicki Vestergaard	€106,400	
11–21 June 2015	(Spain) UKIPT/ESPT Marbella Festival	841	€807,360	(Spain) Isidoro Barrena	€150,800	
19–30 August 2015	(Spain) EPT/ESPT Barcelona	3,292	€3,193,240	(Argentina) Mario Javier López	€408,000	

- Estrellas Poker Tour - Season 6 - GOLD: (France) Sonny Franco
- Estrellas Poker Tour - Season 6 - SILVER: (Spain) Adrian Costin Constantin

== Season 7 ==
Date	Event / City	Entries	Prize Pool	Winner	Prize	Results
9–13 March 2016	(Spain) ESPT Madrid	491	€471,360	(Spain) Pablo Gordillo Caballero	€69,746	
15–19 June 2016	(Spain) UKIPT/ESPT Marbella Festival	844	€810,240	(England) Jonathan Schuman	€96,159	
17–22 August 2016	(Spain) EPT/ESPT Barcelona	3,447	€3,343,590	(France) Mohamed Samri	€353,220	

- Estrellas Poker Tour - Season 7 - GOLD: (Poland) Michal Ozimek
- Estrellas Poker Tour - Season 7 - SILVER: (Republic of Ireland) Mahmood Rasheed

== Season 2022 ==
Date	Event / City	Entries	Prize Pool	Winner	Prize	Results
30 March-2 April 2022	(Spain) ESPT Madrid	784	€752,640	(Romania) Nicolae Giuri	€137,500	
22–26 June 202	Summer Poker Festival; ESPT/UKIPT Malta	815	€782,400	(Bulgaria) Zlatin Penev	€144,630	
9–14 August 2022	(Spain) EPT/ESPT Barcelona	6,313	€6,060,480	(Netherlands) Rick van Bruggen	€600,000	

== Season 2023 ==
Date	Event / City	Entries	Prize Pool	Winner	Prize	Results
29 March-2 April 2023	(Spain) ESPT Madrid	756	€725,760	(Spain) Jon Ander Vallinas	€102,470	
5–9 July 2023	(Spain) ESPT Castellón	310	€297,600	(Ukraine) Ivan Kuziv	€51,430	
21–27 August 2023	(Spain) EPT/ESPT Barcelona	7,398	€7,102,080	(France) Lucien Cohen	€676,230	
20–24 September 2023	(Spain) ESPT Málaga	485	€465,600	(Spain) Jose Gonzalez Sanchez	€91,960	
8–12 November 2023	(Spain) ESPT Sevilla	420	€403,200	(Italy) Federico Castiglioni	€73,290	

== Season 2024 ==
Date	Event / City	Entries	Prize Pool	Winner	Prize	Results
19–24 March	ESPT Madrid €1,100; Casino Gran Vía, Madrid, Spain	629	€602,010	(Lebanon) Fouad Rabahie	€105,000	
10–16 June	UKIPT/ESPT Málaga €1,100; Casino Torrequebrada, Málaga, Spain	1,146	€1,100,160	(Spain) Artus Giménez	€145,000	
24 August-8 September	EPT/ESPT Barcelona €1,100; Casino Barcelona, Barcelona, Spain	7,138	€6,852,480	(France) Sylvain Berthelot	€499,224	

== Winners by country ==
Place	Country	Winners
1st	Spain	18
2nd	France	3
	Germany	3
4th	Argentina	2
	Italy	2
	Netherlands	2
7th	Bulgaria	1
	Denmark	1
	England	1
	Lebanon	1
	Poland	1
	Romania	1
	Scotland	1
	Ukraine	1
Total		38

Up to Season 2024 (Step 3 ESPT Barcelona)
In case of a tie, alphabetical order
