= PPT =

PPT may refer to:

== Organizations ==
- Parti Progressiste Tchadien, a political party active in Chad between 1947 and 1973
- Partido del Pueblo Trabajador (Working People's Party of Puerto Rico), a political party in Puerto Rico
- Patria Para Todos, a left-wing political party in Venezuela
- Permanent Peoples' Tribunal, an international opinion tribunal founded in Bologna, 1979
- Plunge Protection Team, a nickname of the United States President's Working Group on Financial Markets
- Porin Pallo-Toverit, the former name of the Finnish football club FC Jazz
- PTT Public Company Limited, Thai state-owned oil and gas company

== Science and technology ==
- .ppt, the file format used by Microsoft PowerPoint presentation software
- Microsoft PowerPoint, presentation software by Microsoft Corporation
- Slide shows in general
- Parts-per notation for parts-per-trillion (more common) or parts-per-thousand (less common)
- PerlPowerTools, a revitalized of the classic Unix command set in pure Perl
- Positive partial transpose, a criterion used in quantum mechanics
- Power point tracking, a solar energy charging technology
- Primitive Pythagorean triple, three integers that form a right triangle
- Probabilistic polynomial-time, a class of Turing machines that are probabilistic and run in polynomial-time
- Pulsed plasma thruster, a method of spacecraft propulsion

=== Biology and medicine ===
- Palmitoyl protein thioesterase, enzymes that remove thioester-linked fatty acyl groups
  - PPT1, a member of the palmitoyl protein thioesterase family
  - PPT2, a member of the palmitoyl protein thioesterase family
- Pedunculopontine tegmental nucleus, a collection of neurons located in the brainstem
- Peritoneal pull-through vaginoplasty, a surgical procedure used in gender-affirming care
- Podophyllotoxin, a medical cream to treat genital warts
- Propylpyrazoletriol, a selective agonist of ERα used in scientific research
- Protopanaxatriol, a molecule found in ginseng

== Transportation ==
- Faa'a International Airport (IATA airport code), Papeete, Tahiti, French Polynesia
- Personal public transport, a transportation model
- Phoenix Park Tunnel, a rail tunnel in Dublin, Ireland

== Games ==
- Partouche Poker Tour, a poker tournament
- Professional Poker Tour, a series of televised poker tournaments
- Poppy Playtime, a puzzle survival horror video game series developed by Mob Entertainment.

== Other ==
- Periodismo para todos, a journalist TV programme of Argentina
