= Vanessa Selbst =

American poker player (born 1984)

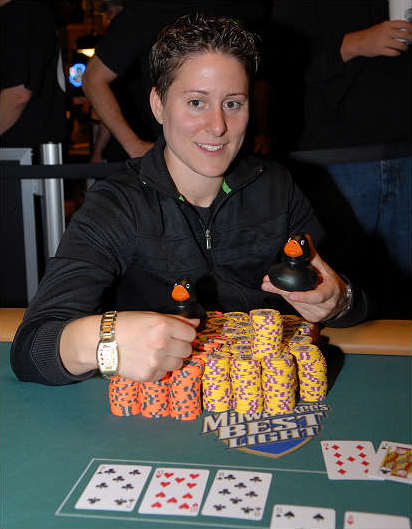
- Selbst after winning the $1,500 Pot-Limit Omaha event at the 2008 World Series of Poker
- Born: July 9, 1984 (age 42)
- Education: Yale University (BA, JD)
- Occupation: Trader
- Employer: Jane Street Capital
- Money Investment Strategies: Arbitrage; Derivative; Options

World Series of Poker
- Bracelets: 3
- Final tables: 8
- Money finishes: 20
- Highest WSOP Main Event finish: 73rd, 2012

World Poker Tour
- Title: None
- Final tables: 2
- Money finishes: 3

European Poker Tour
- Title: None
- Final table: None
- Money finishes: 4

Vanessa K. Selbst (born July 9, 1984) is a poker player, the only woman to ever reach the number one ranking in the world on the Global Poker Index. She has over US$11.8 million in live poker tournament earnings and used to be a member of Team Pokerstars Pro, where she plays under the username "V. Selbst".

Selbst has three World Series of Poker bracelets and is the only woman to win three WSOP bracelets in open field events. She is also the only poker player to win the same North American Poker Tour Main Event back-to-back. In January 2013 Selbst won the PCA high roller for $1.4 million, which made her the highest-earning woman in poker history. Her results put her in the top 100 of the overall All Time Money List, with career tournament winnings just shy of $12 million.

Selbst was born in Brooklyn, New York, into a Jewish family. She attended the Massachusetts Institute of Technology for a year before transferring to Yale University, where she graduated with a degree in political science. After Yale, on a Fulbright scholarship, she spent a year in Spain. On her return to the United States, she worked for consulting firm McKinsey & Company. She later returned to Yale Law School and received her J.D. degree in 2012. During her time at Yale University, she was head of the Yale Queer-Straight Alliance. Selbst was a coach and executive producer for DeucesCracked, an online poker training site.

== World Series of Poker bracelets ==
Year	Event	Prize money
2008	$1,500 Pot-Limit Omaha	$227,933
2012	$2,500 10-Game Six Handed	$244,259
2014	$25,000 Mixed-Max No-Limit Hold'em	$871,148

== Other poker results ==
Selbst has 21 live poker tournament results equaling six figure paydays or above.

Selbst has made five Main Event final tables of various poker tours and gone on to capture three titles. She attended her first World Series at Las Vegas in 2006. She won the 2010 North American Poker Tour $5,000 Mohegan Sun Main Event, earning $750,000 and returned the following year to successfully defend her title. She earned $450,000 for her 2011 1st-place finish and became the first and only person to win two consecutive NAPT Main Events. To date, Selbst's biggest purse was when she won €1,300,000 ($1.82 million) for her first-place finish at the 2010 Partouche Poker Tour.

She has made four High Roller final tables, winning the PokerStars Caribbean Adventure High Roller in January 2013. She is the first woman to ever play in a Super High Roller event, taking third place at the PokerStars Caribbean Adventure $100,000 buy in tournament in January 2014.

One year after her official retirement from poker in 2018, she played the WPT Borgata $3,500 event, ending in 14th place for a payday of $40,000. Not long after, she participated in WPT Fallsview Main Event, where she finished 22nd. In 2025, she participated in the World Series of Poker $10k Eight Game Mixed Championship. In 2026 she participated in the World Series of Poker $1,500 Limit Omaha Hi-Lo 8 event, placing 9th.

As of 2026, Selbst's total live tournament winnings exceed $11,928,000.
