= Belgian Poker Challenge =

Belgian poker tournament

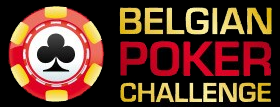
- Sport: Texas Hold 'em
- Founded: 2013
- Country: Belgium
- Most recent champion: (Netherlands) Harun Karakus (2026)
- Website: pokerstarslive.com

The Belgian Poker Challenge (BPC) is a tournament sponsored by PokerStars with the winner becoming the Belgian Poker Champion.

== History ==
The Belgian Poker Challenge (BPC) originated in 2013, when the tournament was held at Casino Middelkerke. The first BPC Main Event had a buy-in of €800, and 381 participants. It was won by Team Pro PokerStars Matthias de Meulder after 7 tournaments, earning €53,459.

Throughout the following years, the series was held alternately between Casino de Spa and Circus Casino Resort Namur. In 2023, the tournament schedule expanded considerably and the number of players also increased. The BPC Main Event in 2023 had 1,332 entries and generated a total prize pool of €1,266,388. It was won by Algerian Omar Lakhdari, earning €206,000.

The 2024 edition of Belgian Poker Challenge was held in May 2024 at Circo Casino Resort Namur, with a €1,100 buy-in and €1,000,000 guaranteed prize pool.

In 2025 the Belgian Poker Challenge has been given a new look and will continue as the PokerStars Open Namur, continuing in Circus Casino Resort and with a €1,100 buy-in and €1,000,000 guaranteed prize pool.

== Results ==
Date	Event / City	Players	Prize Pool	Winner	Prize	Results
2026; 18-27 September	BPC MegaStack Edition 2026 €400 €300,000 Guaranteed; Circus Casino Resort Namur, Namur, Wallonia	932	€307,650	(Netherlands) Harun Karakus	€45,000	
2025; 28 May-9 June	PokerStars Open Namur €1,100 €1,000,000 Guaranteed; Circus Casino Resort Namur, Namur, Wallonia	1,572	€1,493,400	(France) Jean-Vincent Lehut	€238,000	
2024; 8-20 May	BPC NAMUR 2024 €1,100 €1,000,000 Guaranteed; Circus Casino Resort Namur, Namur, Wallonia	1,259	€1,183,791	(France) Rayane Benounnane	€200,000	
2023; 11-21 May	BPC NAMUR 2023 €1,100 €1,000,000 Guaranteed; Circus Casino Resort Namur, Namur, Wallonia	1,332	€1,266,388	(Algeria) Omar Lakhdari	€206,000	
2022; 27 May-6 June	BPC NAMUR 2022 €1,100 €500,000 Guaranteed; Circus Casino Resort Namur, Namur, Wallonia	785	€752,813	(France) Samy Barka	€122,762	
2021; 9-19 December	BPC NAMUR 2021 €1,100; Circus Casino Resort Namur, Namur, Wallonia	CANCELED due COVID-19 restrictions				
2020; 25 November -7 December	BPC NAMUR 2020 €1,100; Circus Casino Resort Namur, Namur, Wallonia	CANCELED due COVID-19 restrictions				
2019; 29 November -8 December	BPC NAMUR 2019 €1,100 €500,000 Guaranteed; Circus Casino Resort Namur, Namur, Wallonia	743	€708,822	(France) Nicolas Ribeiro	€115,000	
2018; 23 November -2 December	BPC NAMUR 2018 €1,100 €500,000 Guaranteed; Circus Casino Resort Namur, Namur, Wallonia	686	€657,874	(Poland) Marcin Puczylowski	€126,252	
2018; 29 May-3 June	BPC SPA €800; Casino de Spa, Liège, Wallonia	686	€151,373	(France) Ahmed Ibrahimi	€24,555	
2017; 24 November -3 December	BPC NAMUR 2017 €1,100 €600,000 Guaranteed; Circus Casino Resort Namur, Namur, Wallonia	645	€619,200	(France) Julien Baldassarre	€84,728	
2017; 16-21 May	BPC SPA €800; Casino de Spa, Liège, Wallonia	208	€147,000	(Belgium) Yves Sergeant	€31,000	
2016; 25 November -4 December	BPC NAMUR 2016 €1,100; Circus Casino Resort Namur, Namur, Wallonia	600	€576,000	(Romania) Vlad-Victor Darie	€90,602	
2016; 31 May-5 June	BPC SPA €800; Casino de Spa, Liège, Wallonia	234	€165,153	(Belgium) Luc Ta	€29,069	
2015; 27 November -6 December	BPC NAMUR 2015 €1,100; Circus Casino Resort Namur, Namur, Wallonia	680	€652,800	(Belgium) Arne Coulier	€101,075	
2015; 6-10 May	BPC SPA €800; Casino de Spa, Liège, Wallonia	289	€202,242	(Germany) Marius Pospiech	€37,346	
2014; 28 November -7 December	BPC NAMUR 2014 €1,100; Circus Casino Resort Namur, Namur, Wallonia	683	€654,309	(Belgium) Arne Coulier	€113,820	
2014; 3-7 September	BPC SPA €800; Casino de Spa, Liège, Wallonia	260	€181,948	(Belgium) Cheng-Wei Yin	€45,026	
2013; 22 November -1 December	BPC NAMUR 2013 €1,500; Circus Casino Resort Namur, Namur, Wallonia	470	€608,180	(Belgium) Laurens De Smet	€97,304	
2013; 9-15 September	BPC SPA €800; Casino de Spa, Liège, Wallonia	369	€258,654	(Belgium) Julien Lannoy	€42,595	
2013; 8-14 April	BPC MIDDELKERKE €800; Casino Middelkerke, West Flanders, Flanders	381	€267,015	(Belgium) Matthias De Meulder	€53,459	
