= Jason Mercier =

American poker player (born 1986)

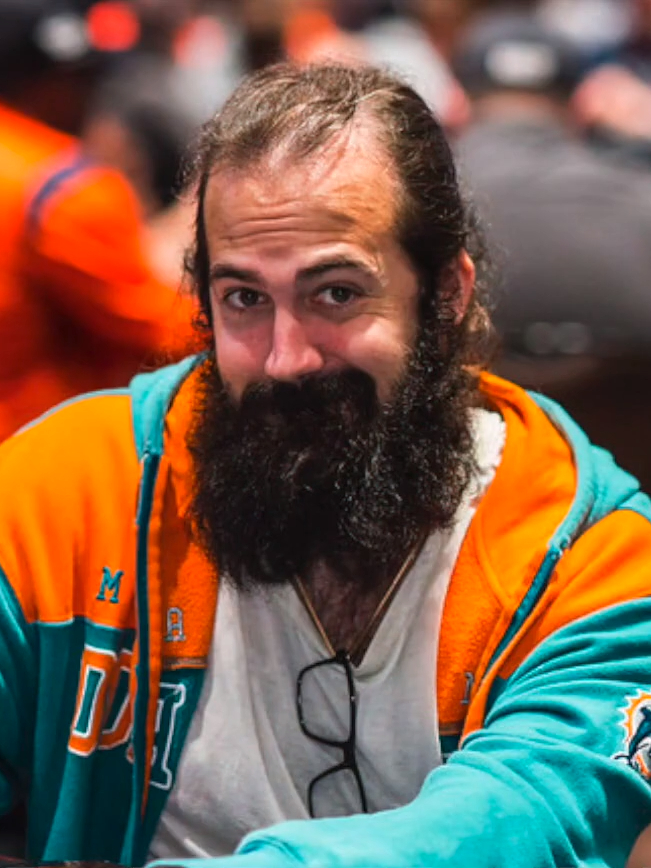
- Mercier playing at the 2019 WPT Seminole Hard Rock Poker Showdown
- Nickname: treysfull21
- Born: November 12, 1986 (age 40)
- Career highlights: 2016 WSOP Player of the Year; WSOP $25k Fantasy Draft (Winner 2011 & 2012)
World Series of Poker
- Bracelets: 6
- Final tables: 17
- Money finishes: 58
- Highest WSOP Main Event finish: 463rd, 2010
World Poker Tour
- Title: None
- Final table: None
- Money finishes: 9
European Poker Tour
- Title: 1
- Final tables: 3
- Money finishes: 9

Jason Mercier (born November 12, 1986) is an American professional poker player from Hollywood, Florida. He has won six World Series of Poker bracelets and one European Poker Tour title. Mercier is a member of Team PokerStars Pro and was named the Bluff Magazine Player of the Year for 2009. He was WSOP Player of the Year in 2016.

Mercier has been ranked number one in the world by ESPN and the Global poker index. He holds the record for most weeks spent at number 1 on the GPI, 84. As of June 2026, his live tournament winnings exceed $21.8 million. His 79 cashes at the WSOP account for $5,582,599 of those winnings. While Mercier officially retired in 2018, he has continued to compete in various events, including four tournament cashes at the 2024 WSOP.

== European Poker Tour ==
In 2008 Mercier made two final tables at the European Poker Tour (EPT). His first was at the EPT San Remo in season 4 where he won the event earning €869,000 ($1,372,893) with a final table that included online professional poker players, and Team PokerStars Pro's Dario Minieri (3rd) and William Thorson (6th). The following season he made his second EPT final table coming in 6th in the 2008 EPT Barcelona event in season 5, earning €227,800 ($324,946).

In October 2008, he won the EPT London £20,000 High Roller Event. Better known as the "2008 £1 Million Showdown", this non-title event earned Mercier an additional £516,000 ($944,847). The final table included runner-up John Juanda, who had recently won the 2008 World Series of Poker Europe Main Event. Other notable contestants at the final table were online pros Mike "SirWatts" Watson and Isaac Haxton as well as professionals Scotty Nguyen, David Benyamine and Isabelle Mercier. In May 2013, he was runner-up in the 100,000 EPT Monte Carlo Grand Final for $1,462,964.

== World Series of Poker ==
Mercier has won six gold bracelets at the WSOP. In addition to his tournament victories, Mercier has made the final table twice at the World Series of Poker Europe Main Event, finishing 4th in 2009 for £267,267 and 8th in 2012 for €84,672.

=== World Series of Poker Bracelets ===
Year	Tournament	Prize (US$)
2009	$1,500 Pot Limit Omaha	$237,415
2011	$5,000 Pot Limit Omaha (Six Handed)	$619,575
2015	$5,000 No Limit Hold'em (Six Handed)	$633,357
2016	$10,000 2–7 No Limit Draw Lowball Championship	$273,335
2016	$10,000 H.O.R.S.E Championship	$422,874
2023	$1,500 No Limit 2–7 Lowball Draw	$151,276

== North American Poker Tour ==
Mercier won the 2010 NAPT Mohegan Sun $25,000 Bounty Shootout tournament earning a total of $475,000. He beat a final table which included Sam Stein, who finished runner-up in the NAPT Venetian Main Event, and Faraz Jaka, who finished 5th at the NAPT Venetian Bounty Shootout event. In 2011, he repeated as the NAPT Mohegan Sun Bounty Shootout champion, not only winning the event, but also collecting the most bounties for a total of $246,600.

== World Championship of Online Poker ==
On September 21, 2010, Mercier won his first WCOOP bracelet in Event 42, besting a field of 3,122 runners.

World Championship of Online Poker Titles
Year	Event	Tournament	Prize (US$)
2010	Event 42	$1,050 No Limit Hold’em	$435,862.07
2012	Event 64	$10,300 8-Game (High-Roller)	$253,425.00

== Spring Championship of Online Poker ==
On May 15, 2014, Mercier won his first SCOOP title in Event 34-M. With three more titles in 2015 and one in 2016, Jason has a total of 5 SCOOP titles.

Spring Championship of Online Poker Titles
Year	Event	Tournament	Prize (US$)
2014	Event 34-M	$215 8-Game	$21,242.00
2015	Event 5-H	$2,100 FL Badugi	$39,200.00
2015	Event 8-H	$2,100 NL 5 Card Draw	$34,400.00
2015	Event 20-H	$2,100 NL Hold'em [4-Max]	$178,457.73
2016	Event 42-M	$215 PL Omaha Hi/Lo [6-Max]	$22,572.00
