= Michael Binger =

American poker player (born 1976)

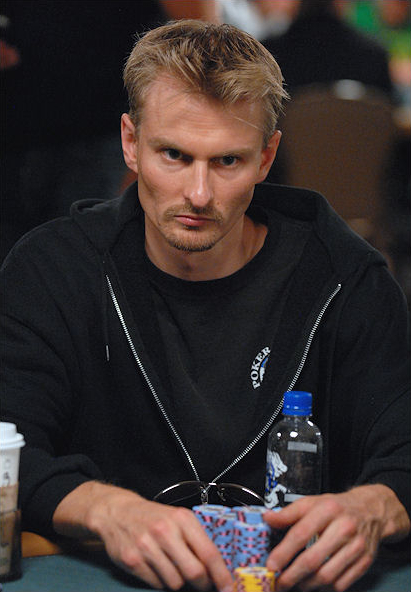
- Binger at the 2008 World Series of Poker
- Nickname: The Machine
- Born: December 20, 1976 (age 49); Delray Beach, Florida, U.S.

World Series of Poker
- Bracelet: None
- Money finishes: 23
- Highest WSOP Main Event finish: 3rd, 2006

World Poker Tour
- Title: None
- Final table: None
- Money finishes: 6

Michael W. Binger (born December 20, 1976, in Delray Beach, Florida) is a part-time professional poker player, based in Atherton, California. He has a brother, Nick Binger, who also has several high-profile tournament cashes.

Binger graduated from North Carolina State University before receiving a Ph.D. in theoretical physics from Stanford University in 2006. Just two months after receiving his PhD, he outlasted 8,770 players in the 2006 World Series of Poker (WSOP) $10,000 No limit Texas Hold'em Main Event, finishing third and earning $4,123,310. Binger had reached a final table earlier in that year's WSOP, finishing sixth.

Since the 2006 WSOP, Binger has finished in the money of six World Poker Tour events. At the 2007 WSOP, Binger tied Chris Ferguson, Phil Hellmuth and Humberto Brenes for second most cashes of any player in a single World Series of Poker season with eight. This included a final table appearance in Event 22 a $5,000 buy-in No limit Texas Hold'em tournament (finishing 3rd) won by James Mackey.

Binger won the 2008 WSOP Circuit Event – Lake Tahoe, $5,150 Championship, earning $181,379

As of 2019, his total live tournament winnings exceed $7,000,000, most of which ($5,167,037) have come at the WSOP.
