= PokerStars =

Online poker cardroom

PokerStars Inc.
- Type: Subsidiary
- Industry: Online poker
- Founded: December 12, 2001; 24 years ago in Costa Rica
- Founder: Isai Scheinberg and Mark Scheinberg
- Headquarters: Douglas, Isle of Man
- Area served: Worldwide
- Key people: Kevin Harrington (Pokerstars CEO), Peter Jackson (Flutter CEO)
- Parent: Flutter Entertainment (2020–present)
- Website: pokerstars.com

Screenshot of the Pokerstars GUI (the "classic" theme) at a real money table

PokerStars is an online poker cardroom. It was the largest real money online poker site in the world, controlling over two-thirds of the total online poker market, and can be accessed through downloadable poker clients for Windows, macOS, Android and iOS.

A PokerStars.com online satellite tournament produced the 2003 World Series of Poker (WSOP) champion, Chris Moneymaker. As the first person to become a world champion by qualifying at an online poker site, Moneymaker's 2003 win was an important factor in catalyzing the poker boom of the mid-2000s. The press has called this the "Moneymaker effect."

PokerStars was part of The Stars Group until it was sold to Flutter Entertainment, owner of the Irish gambling company Paddy Power, on May 5, 2020.

== History ==
PokerStars launched its beta play-money-only site on September 11, 2001. The company began offering real money wagering on December 12, 2001. PokerStars was originally a Costa Rican company, Rational Enterprises, part of Canadian company The Stars Group, which was majority owned by the Canadian Scheinberg family. The company was subsequently moved to Douglas, Isle of Man. The move was driven by the establishment of a 0% corporate tax rate and the removal of rules barring companies from accepting casino and poker bets from the United States. PokerStars holds numerous licences in other jurisdictions (see Regulated Markets below). In February 2012, PokerStars acquired a European Union license granted by the Malta Lotteries and Gaming Commission.

While privately owned, PokerStars had been the subject of financial media speculation regarding a possible initial public offering or merger with a publicly listed company. Analysts estimated its market value would have been approximately US$2,000,000,000 in 2006, which would have made the company one of the world's largest privately held gambling companies. PokerStars overtook PartyPoker as the world's largest online poker room after the U.S. Congress passed the Unlawful Internet Gambling Enforcement Act of 2006. Many sites, including PartyPoker, immediately suspended business with U.S. gamblers, while others, including PokerStars, did not.

In December 2009, PokerStars set the world record for the biggest online tournament. The tournament entry fee was $1, and the number of entrants reached 149,196. They broke that record in December 2011, when 200,000 players played in a $1 buy-in tournament with a first prize of $50,000. PokerStars was so busy during the early stages of the tournament that all tournaments had to be stopped for 20 minutes because the heavy traffic crashed their servers. This record was broken again in June 2013, with 225,000 participants. The buy-in was $1 and went completely into the prize pool, with no rake.

In January 2012, PokerStars introduced a downloadable mobile client for iOS from iTunes. In February 2012, the company also introduced a client for Android.

In July 2012, PokerStars bought its former competitor, Full Tilt Poker. The $731 million deal settled a civil lawsuit with the Department of Justice while giving ownership of Full Tilt Poker's assets to PokerStars.

In June 2014, The Stars Group, then known as Amaya Inc, agreed to buy PokerStars and its parent company for $4.9 billion in cash. The deal was completed on August 1, 2014. Later the deal led to a major insider trading investigation conducted by the Autorité des marchés financiers (AMF) over a four-year period concerning Amaya Inc.

As of April 2016, they have reached an agreement with Netent to add desktop and mobile gambling games to its poker lobby in New Jersey and other locations.

In February 2017, Microgaming announced a partnership with PokerStars, owned by its parent company, for the integration of its Quickfire platform.

In July 2017, PokerStars agreed to a deal with bankruptcy administrators to acquire some of rival PKR.com's assets without reviving the brand, while refunding the full account balances of the entire PKR player base.

In December 2017, PokerStars unveiled a brand new player tournament called the PokerStars Players No Limit Hold'em Championship, which is to be held in January 2019. The tournament is expected to become one of the biggest events in the annual poker calendar, with a $25,000 buy in and a $1 million bonus for the eventual winner.

In March 2018, The Stars Group reached an agreement with gaming company Sugal & Damani to support the launch of its PokerStars brand in India.

In September 2018, PokerStars launched PokerStars VR, a fully immersive virtual reality poker experience. The platform was developed in collaboration with virtual reality software developer Lucky VR and was unveiled at EGX 2018.

In October 2019, The Stars Group, owner of PokerStars, agreed to be acquired by Flutter Entertainment in a $6 billion all-share merger. On May 5, 2020, PokerStars became part of Flutter Entertainment.

In 2021, PokerStars entered into a partnership with Red Bull Racing, sponsoring their Formula One team, with the brand to appear on Red Bull's new cars for the next few seasons, as well as on the suits of Max Verstappen and Sergio Pérez.

In January 2022, PokerStars announced an extended multi-year partnership deal with Red Bull Racing. The deal included PokerStars' branding on the RB18 and race suits. The company stated they aim to provide fans "new and unique ways" to watch the sport, in addition to increasing technological advancements.

In April 2022, PokerStars launched its peer-to-peer betting exchange, which allowed customers to enter their own odds and bet against other customers.

In December 2022, PokerStars announced that Michigan and New Jersey players would be unable to access their servers on December 12 and December 13 for a "major upgrade of the site". This upgrade is to allow Michigan and New Jersey poker players to play together, as both states are participants in the Multi-State Internet Gaming Agreement (MSIGA). PokerStars stated, "The upgrade is a necessary milestone to bring more games, bigger prize pools and guarantees in poker tournaments so New Jersey and Michigan poker players can compete against one another in the near future."

=== FanDuel migration in North America ===
In March 2026, Flutter Entertainment announced that PokerStars' standalone real money platforms in New Jersey, Pennsylvania, Michigan, and Ontario would be discontinued, with operations migrating to FanDuel under the branding "PokerStars Exclusively on FanDuel." The move expanded the shared liquidity pool—previously established between New Jersey and Michigan in 2023—to include Pennsylvania, while Ontario remained a ring-fenced market.

Flutter stated that the merged player pool would enable larger tournament guarantees and greater cash game availability, and that the network structure would allow additional regulated states to join in the future. The transition involved the cessation of the existing PokerStars loyalty program and the discontinuation of progressive jackpots ahead of the platform switch. The rebrand was seen as consistent with Flutter's broader North American strategy of consolidating its offerings under the FanDuel name, with the PokerStars brand expected to continue as Flutter's primary poker brand outside North America.

== Games ==
PokerStars offers multiple poker variations: Texas hold 'em, Omaha, Omaha Hi/Lo (8 or Better), Courchevel, Stud, Stud Hi/Lo (8 or Better), Razz, Five-card draw, 2-7 Triple Draw & 2-7 Single Draw, Badugi, HORSE, HOSE, Mixed Hold'em, Mixed Omaha Hi/Lo, Triple Stud and 8-Game Mix. PokerStars also offers "Mixed Games," which rotate through several of these games.

PokerStars averages over 15,000 players playing real money cash games daily.

PokerStars launched Zoom Poker in March 2012, with an official launch in May 2012. Zoom Poker is a fast fold ring game poker format where opponents change after every hand. The aim of Zoom poker is to offer players more hands of poker than in a regular ring game. In January 2013 PokerStars rolled out Zoom Poker Tournaments due to popular demand for the fast fold variant

== Online tournaments ==
The site's weekly Sunday Million tournament has a guaranteed $1 million prize pool and a $215 buy-in. The Sunday Million is the biggest weekly online poker tournament. On March 7, 2011, The 5th Anniversary Sunday Million broke records, with 59,128 players creating a total prize pool of $11,825,600.

World Championship of Online Poker (WCOOP) has been running since 2002 and is regarded as the online equivalent of the World Series of Poker. The WCOOP tournament series is the largest online poker series and pays out the largest prizes in online poker. The WCOOP 2010 Main Event champion Tyson "POTTERPOKER" Marks won $2.2 Million, the largest online tournament prize in history.

Spring Championship of Online Poker (SCOOP) was established in 2009 and became the most popular online tournament series. Unlike WCOOP, there are three different buy-in stakes in the SCOOP events: Low, Medium (10x Low stake) and High (100x Low stake).

SCOOP 2020, played during the first spring of lockdowns, was the biggest online poker festival the world had ever seen, but just six years later – due to regulatory changes, geopolitical events and market shifts – the series distributes barely a third of the prize money it once did. The average High-tier SCOOP event in 2025 paid out less than the average Low-tier event did in 2020.

For 2026, PokerStars has scheduled 400 events — the largest schedule in SCOOP history — with 145 PKOs and a heavy lean toward mid-stakes.

Micro Millions was launched in March 2012 as a tournament series designed for recreational and micro-stakes players offering a low buy-in tournament schedule and large guaranteed cash prizes. PokerStars guaranteed $5 million in prize pools for the second installment of MicroMillions.

In 2014, PokerStars was hosting 500,000 online tournaments each day.

== Live Poker Tours ==
PokerStars sponsors various live poker tours ongoing such as:

- European Poker Tour (EPT)
- Asia Pacific Poker Tour (APPT)
- North American Poker Tour (NAPT)
- PokerStars Open (PS Open)
- pt:Brazilian Series of Poker (BSOP)
- PokerStars Caribbean Adventure (PCA)
- PokerStars Players Championship (PSPC)
- Swiss Poker Series (SPS)
- Campeonato de España de Poker (CEP)
- Irish Poker Open (Irish Open)
- LexLive (LexLive)
- Belgian Poker Challenge (BPC)
- Manila Super Series, Manila Megastack and Okada Manila Millions at PokerStars Live Room, Okada Manila

And tournaments that did not continue, such as:

- Australia New Zealand Poker Tour (ANZPT) 2009-2015
- Brazil Poker Tour (BPT) 2011-2012
- Czech-Slovak Poker Tour (CSPT) 2009
- Estrellas Poker Tour (ESPT) 2010-2024
- Eureka Poker Tour (EKA) 2011-2024
- France Poker Series (FPS) 2010-2024
- Italian Poker Tour (IPT) 2009-2017
- Italian Poker Open (IPO) 2018-2019
- Latin American Poker Tour (LAPT) 2008-2024
- Russian Poker Tour (RPT) 2008-2009
- Russian Poker Series (RPS) 2010-2012
- UK and Ireland Poker Tour (UKIPT) 2009-2024
- PokerStars Championship (PSC) 2017
- PokerStars Festival (PSF) 2016-2018
- PokerStars Live London Series 2017-2021 at PokerStars Live Room, Hippodrome, London

== Live Poker Rooms ==
PokerStars live poker rooms around the world such as:

- PokerStars Live Room London - UK, at The Hippodrome Casino London
- PokerStars Live Room Manila - Philippines, at Okada Manila

== Vegas Infinite ==
Vegas Infinite, formerly PokerStars VR, is a free-play poker game for Oculus and Steam platforms that was released in 2018. It allows players to get free chips and use them to play Texas hold 'em as well as roulette, blackjack, slots, and sports betting, although the winnings cannot be transferred into real money. Players can use store credits to buy cosmetics and props for use in games. As of February 2022 it was the 14th most popular game on Meta Quest. In October 2023, PC support without a VR headset was added along with a rebranding.

== PokerStars.net ==
PokerStars.net is a company website offering only free play games. The pokerstars.net domain is used primarily in their TV advertisements since there are no real money games available at this website. This avoids any legal issues or censorship of using their pokerstars.com domain which allows real money games.

== PokerStars.tv ==
PokerStars.tv is the online source for PokerStars TV shows, commercials and event highlight shows – with commentary and expert analysis available in up to 7 languages. The content available includes live cards-up coverage of the biggest PokerStars tournaments, TV shows such as The Million Dollar Challenge and PokerStars Big Game and online tournament highlights from WCOOP and SCOOP.

== Team PokerStars ==
PokerStars sponsors a team of professional poker players known as Team PokerStars. As of 2023, the team consists of André Akkari, Arlie Shaban, Ben Spragg, David Kaye, Felix Schneiders, Fintan Hand, Georgina James, Jennifer Shahade, Lasse Jagd Lauritsen, Laurie Tournier, Lex Veldhuis, Nicholas Walsh, Parker Talbot, Rafael Moraes, Ramón Colillas, Sam Grafton and Sebastian Huber.

== Celebrity players ==
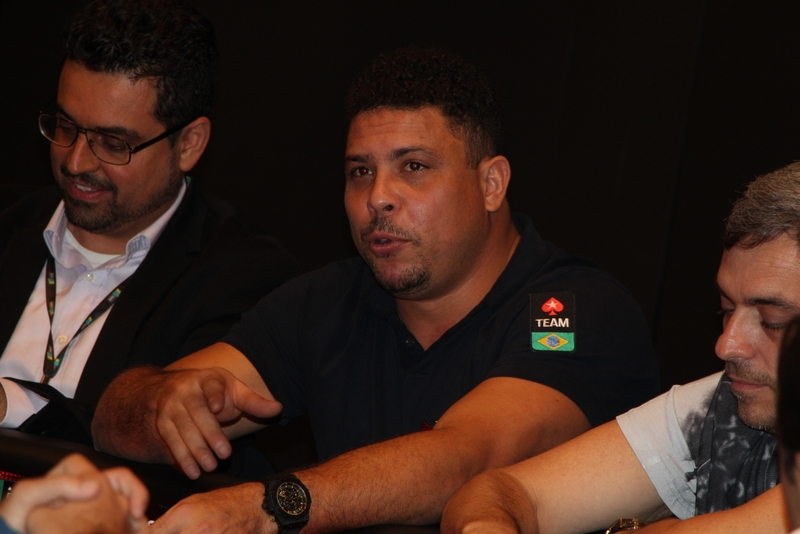
Former Brazil striker Ronaldo pictured with PokerStars in 2014

PokerStars also has had a Celebrity team and a Sports team, called respectively "Friends of PokerStars" and "SportStars". These have included Jamaican Olympic gold medal winner and World record holder Usain Bolt and American actor comedian Kevin Hart. Former associated celebrities include World Cup winning Brazilian striker Ronaldo, tennis pro Rafael Nadal, former tennis champion Boris Becker, FIFA World Cup-winning Italian goalkeeper Gianluigi Buffon, Manchester United star Cristiano Ronaldo, Dutch field hockey Olympic Gold medalist Fatima Moreira de Melo, Norwegian cross-country skier Petter Northug, Swedish cross-country skier Marcus Hellner, quantitative analyst and author of the 'Chen Formula' for Texas Hold'em Bill Chen, Brazilian auto racer and race team owner Gualter Salles and French rugby union international Sébastien Chabal.

== Regulated markets ==
PokerStars.com and PokerStars.eu operate worldwide under a license from the Maltese government. PokerStars also operates under separate government licenses in Denmark, France, Italy, Belgium, Spain and Estonia. In October 2008, PokerStars launched PokerStars.it, exclusively for Italian players, which offers real money tournaments in euros in addition to the usual play money games. PokerStars offers some ring games and tournaments on its main PokerStars.com site in euros. In March 2010, the site began allowing users to keep their real-money accounts in British pounds and Canadian dollars as well as U.S. dollars and euros.

In July 2015, PokerStars withdrew from the Portuguese market. In November 2016 the Portuguese regulator, Serviços de Regulação e Inspeção de Jogos (SRIJ) issued its first online poker license to The Stars Group's subsidiary REEL Europe Limited. As a result, legal online poker returned to Portugal.

In March 2016, PokerStars launched in New Jersey for real money.

In June 2016, PokerStars ceased to allow real-money online poker in Israel. The decision is thought to have been made after recent pressure from the country's banking regulator on financial institutions demanding they stop processing online gambling transactions.

In July 2016, PokerStars stopped offering real money games to players who are physically located in, or have a registered address in, Slovenia.

In November 2018, PokerStars was cleared to launch in Pennsylvania for real money in 2019.

On January 29, 2021, PokerStars launched in Michigan. PokerStars was Michigan's first regulated online poker site.

In December 2022, PokerStars announced the would be combining players from Michigan and New Jersey under the Multi-State Internet Gaming Agreement.

In February 2024, PokerStars disagreed with Peru's new online gambling regulation and exited the country.

== Domain name seizure ==
United States Department of Justice website seizure notice. Online poker was suspended on April 15 at the top three United States poker websites (PokerStars, Full Tilt Poker and Cereus Poker Network).

On April 15, 2011, the Department of Justice seized the .com internet addresses of the three online gambling sites, a total of five URLs: Pokerstars.com, Fulltiltpoker.com, Absolutepoker.com, Ultimatebet.com and UB.com.

On April 15, 2011, the U.S. Attorney's Office for the Southern District of New York seized and shut down Pokerstars.com and several of its competitors' sites, alleging that the sites were violating federal bank fraud and money laundering laws. On April 20, 2011, the U.S. Attorney's office returned control of the Pokerstars.com domain name to the company in order "to facilitate the withdrawal of U.S. players’ funds held in account with the companies."

On July 10, 2012, PokerStars, asserting the Government had insufficient grounds on which to base the charges, filed motions to dismiss the charges against them.

On July 31, 2012, the US government dismissed with prejudice all civil complaints against PokerStars and Full Tilt Poker after reaching a settlement with PokerStars which includes PokerStars acquiring Full Tilt. Under the terms of the settlement, PokerStars and Full Tilt Poker admitted no wrongdoing for their past U.S. activities. The U.S. Government acknowledged both companies can apply for licenses to operate online gaming in the U.S. when a legal framework for such licenses is offered. The settlement terms also called for PokerStars to acquire certain assets of Full Tilt Poker from the Government.

On August 9, 2012, PokerStars paid $225 million to the United States Department of Justice, consummating the asset transfer of Full Tilt Poker. Full Tilt Poker was successfully relaunched on November 6, 2012.
