= North American Poker Tour =

Series of international poker tournaments

- Sport: Texas Hold 'em
- Founded: 2010
- CEO: Kevin Harrington
- Country: North America
- Website: napt.com

The North American Poker Tour (NAPT) was a series of international poker tournaments held in North America. The NAPT included an associated television series broadcasting the final table of some of the tournaments.

The NAPT was started in 2010 by PokerStars, then the largest online poker cardroom in the world. The televised series aired on ESPN2 in the United States.

Players were able to enter the NAPT events by paying the entry fee or by playing online poker freeroll satellites on the PokerStars.net domain.

Season 1 consisted of 7 events played in 2010. Season 2 saw 4 events played in early 2011 before competition was suspended.

On April 15, 2011, along with similar competitors' sites, Pokerstars.com was seized and shut down by U.S. Attorney's Office for the Southern District of New York, which alleged it was in violation of federal bank fraud and money laundering laws. The company subsequently stopped allowing players from the United States to play real money games and temporarily moved the main company website to Pokerstars.eu.

As of February 13, 2012, the NAPT website, and information on remaining events for Season 2, had not been updated since the April 15, 2011 seizure. The last NAPT event had concluded just 2 days earlier, on April 13, 2011, when Vanessa Selbst defended her Season 1 NAPT Mohegan Sun victory by winning the Season 2 NAPT Mohegan Sun event.

As of March 3, 2012 (possibly earlier), the NAPT website no longer showed the North American series—redirecting instead to information regarding the Latin American Poker Tour.

On August 30, 2023, PokerStars announced that the North American Poker Tour would return to the US with a stop in Las Vegas, Nevada, in November.

Taking place from November 4-12, 2023, the Third Season of the NAPT featured a $1650 Main Event, a $5300 High Roller event, and a $550 PokerStars Cup at the Resorts World Las Vegas.

== Results ==
=== Season 1 (2010) ===
Date	Event / City	Players	Prize Pool	Winner	Prize	Results
5-11 Jan	(The Bahamas) PCA 2010 $10,300; Paradise Island	1,529	$14,831,300	(United States) Harrison Gimbel	$2,200,000	
11-14 Jan	(The Bahamas) PCA 2010 High Roller $25,500; Paradise Island	84	$2,057,998	(United States) William Reynolds	$576,240	
20-24 Feb	(United States) NAPT Venetian $5,000; Las Vegas / NV	872	$4,017,740	(United States) Tom Marchese	$827,648	
23-25 Feb	(United States) NAPT Venetian High Roller Bounty Shootout $25,600; Las Vegas / NV	49	$1,240,000	(United States) Ashton Griffin	$560,000	
7-11 April	(United States) NAPT Mohegan Sun $5,000; Uncasville / CT	716	$3,365,200	(United States) Vanessa Selbst	$750,000	
11-13 April	(United States) NAPT Mohegan Sun High Roller Bounty Shootout $25,600; Uncasville / CT	35	$875,000	(United States) Jason Mercier	$475,000	
12-17 Nov	(United States) NAPT Los Angeles $5,000; Los Angeles / CA	701	$3,229,857	(United States) Joe Tehan	$725,000	

=== Season 2 (2011) ===
Date	Event / City	Players	Prize Pool	Winner	Prize	Results
8-15 Jan	(The Bahamas) PCA 2011 $10,300; Paradise Island	1,560	$15,132,000	(United States) Galen Hall	$2,300,000	
15-16 Jan	(The Bahamas) PCA 2011 NAPT Bounty Shootout $5,250; Paradise Island	216	$838,100	(Canada) Andrew Chen	$263,100	
9-13 Abril	(United States) NAPT Mohegan Sun $5,000; Uncasville / CT	387	$1,764,330	(United States) Vanessa Selbst	$450,000	
12-14 April	(United States) NAPT Mohegan Sun High Roller Bounty Shootout $10,000; Uncasville / CT	78	$780,000	(United States) Jason Mercier	$246,600	

=== Season 3 (2023) ===
Date	Event / City	Players	Prize Pool	Winner	Prize	Results
6-11 Nov	(United States) NAPT Las Vegas $1,650; Las Vegas / NV	1,095	$1,609,650	(United States) Sami Bechahed	$268.945	
5-7 Nov	(United States) NAPT Las Vegas Super High Roller $10,300; Las Vegas / NV	59	$572,300	(United States) Jesse Lonis	$174,550	
10-12 Nov	(United States) NAPT Las Vegas High Roller $5,300; Las Vegas / NV	150	$727,500	(United States) Samuel Laskowitz	$180,850	

=== Season 4 (2024) ===
Sponsored Events
MSPC - Maryland State Poker Championship (ACCESS to NAPT); Live! Casino & Hotel, Hanover, Maryland
Date	Event / City	Players	Prize Pool	Winner	Prize	Results
31 Jul-4 Aug	(United States) MSPC Kickoff Event $600; Prizepool Guaranteed $300,000	892	$454,701	(United States) Nick Kocman	$77,869	
4 Aug	(United States) MSPC 6-max Event $400; Prizepool Guaranteed $50,000	215	$71,810	(United States) Marshall Tarzy	$11,823	
9-12 Aug	(United States) MSPC Main Event $2,200; Prizepool Guaranteed $500,000	245	$500,000	(United States) Ben Gazzola	$110,578	
PSPC - Pennsylvania State Poker Championship (ACCESS to NAPT); Live! Casino & Hotel, Philadelphia, Pennsylvania
Date	Event / City	Players	Prize Pool	Winner	Prize	Results
21-25 Aug	(United States) PSPC Event #1 $550; Prizepool Guaranteed $200,000	890	$412,960	(United States) Luke Rothschild	$47,474	
28 Aug-1 Sep	(United States) PSPC Event #2 $1,100; Prizepool Guaranteed $300,000	499	$479,040	(United States) Jonas Wexler	$58,555	
4-8 Sep	(United States) PSPC Main Event $2,200; Prizepool Guaranteed $500,000	243	$500,000	(United States) Max Pinnola	$103,000	

Date	Event / City	Players	Prize Pool	Winner	Prize	Results
1-4 Nov	(United States) NAPT Las Vegas Mystery Bounty $550; Prizepool Guaranteed $300,000; Resorts World Las Vegas / NV	1,201	$576,480	(Croatia) Šverko Gregor	$66,300	
4-6 Nov	(United States) NAPT Las Vegas Super High Roller $25,000; Resorts World Las Vegas / NV	60	$1,440,600	(United States) Stephen Song	$439,400	
5-10 Nov	(United States) NAPT Las Vegas MAIN EVENT $5,300; Prizepool Guaranteed $3,000,000; Resorts World Las Vegas / NV	895	$4,340,750	(United States) Nicholas Marchington	$765,200	
8-10 Nov	(United States) NAPT Las Vegas High Roller $10,300; Resorts World Las Vegas / NV	170	$1,649,000	(United States) Sam Soverel	$385,750	

=== Season 5 (2025) ===
Date	Event / City	Players	Prize Pool	Winner	Prize	Results
3-6 Nov	(United States) PokerStars Open Las Vegas $1,100; Prizepool Guaranteed $500,000; Resorts World Las Vegas / NV	947	$909,120	(Russia) Nikolai Mamut	$158,700	
5-6 Nov	(United States) PokerStars Open Las Vegas High Roller $2,200; Resorts World Las Vegas / NV	210	$403,200	(United States) Gabriel Andrade	$85,180	
5-7 Nov	(United States) NAPT Las Vegas Super High Roller $50,000; Resorts World Las Vegas / NV	23	$1,115,730	(England) Stephen Chidwick	$557,930	
6-12 Nov	(United States) NAPT Las Vegas MAIN EVENT $5,300; Prizepool Guaranteed $3,000,000; Resorts World Las Vegas / NV	738	$3,579,300	(United States) Gal Yifrach	$543,025	
9-10 Nov	(United States) NAPT Las Vegas Women's Event $330; Prizepool Guaranteed $50,000; Resorts World Las Vegas / NV	175	$50,000	(United States) Raena James	$11,670	
10 Nov	(United States) NAPT Las Vegas Women's High Roller $1,100; Resorts World Las Vegas / NV	81	$77,760	(Canada) Elaine Rawn	$21,910	
10-12 Nov	(United States) NAPT Las Vegas High Roller $10,300; Resorts World Las Vegas / NV	158	$1,532,600	(United States) Vitalijs Zavorotnijs	$358,400	
10-12 Nov	(United States) NAPT Las Vegas Mystery Bounty $550; Prizepool Guaranteed $200,000; Resorts World Las Vegas / NV	494	$237,120 with bounties	(Canada) Thomas Taylor	$42,300 with bounties	
