= PokerStars Open season 2026 results =

PokerStars Open 2026
- League: PokerStars Open
- Sport: Poker
- Duration: January 23, 2026 – December 7, 2026
- Total attendance: 19,052 (Main Event only)

Statistics
- Countries: Italy - Campione; France - Paris; United States - Philadelphia; Ireland - Dublin; Monaco - Monte Carlo; Belgium - Namur; Spain - Málaga; Spain - Barcelona; France - Aix-en-Provence; Czech Republic - Prague

PokerStars Open seasons
- ← Season 2025 Season 2027 →

Below are the results of the second season of the PokerStars Open. All currency amounts are in "€" Euro, U$ Dollar (and local currency when apply).

== Results ==
=== (Italy) PokerStars Open Campione ===
- Casino: Casinò di Campione, Campione, Italy
- Buy-in: €1,100 (€960+100+40) (~$1,318)
- 10-Day Full Event: Friday, January 23, 2026, to Sunday, February 1, 2026
- 5-Day Main Event: Wednesday, January 28, 2026, to Sunday, February 1, 2026
- Number of buy-ins: 1,582 (837 entries + 745 re-entries)
- Guaranteed Prize Pool: €1,000,000 (~$1,198,035)
- Total Prize Pool: €1,518,720 (~$1,819,480)
- Number of Payouts: 223
- Official Results: The Hendom Mob - PokerStars Open Campione

Final Table
| Place | Name | Original Prize | Prize (U$D) |
|---|---|---|---|
| 1st | (Switzerland) Elvir Nuhiu | €200,640 | $240,374 |
| 2nd | (Italy) Vincenzo Petruzziello | €167,536 | $200,714 |
| 3rd | (France) Christian Stantchev | €150,634 | $180,465 |
| 4th | (Italy) Eduard Fondos | €86,020 | $103,055 |
| 5th | (Italy) Michele Brandes | €66,170 | $79,274 |
| 6th | (Italy) Renzo Pedrotti | €50,910 | $60,992 |
| 7th | (Italy) Thomas Olivieri | €39,150 | $46,903 |
| 8th | (India) Giorgio Favotto | €30,130 | $36,097 |

=== (France) EPT PokerStars Open Paris ===
Side Event: PokerStars Open Main Event Paris (Event #1)

- Casino: Palais des congrès de Paris, Paris, France
- Buy-in: €1,650 (€1,440+210) (~$1,945)
- 12-Day Full Event: Wednesday, February 18, 2026, to Sunday, March 1, 2026
- 6-Day Main Event: Wednesday, February 18, 2026, to Monday, February 23, 2026
- Number of buy-ins: 2,992 (1,393 entries + 1,599 re-entries)
- Total Prize Pool: €4,308,480 (~$5,079,557)
- Number of Payouts: 448
- Official Results: The Hendom Mob - PokerStars Open Paris

Final Table
| Place | Name | Original Prize | Prize (U$D) |
|---|---|---|---|
| 1st | (Hungary) Patrik Demus | €551,090 | $649,717 |
| 2nd | (France) Enzo Nicolas | €346,230 | $408,193 |
| 3rd | (Italy) Lulei Hu | €247,310 | $291,570 |
| 4th | (Sweden) Adam Martinsson | €190,220 | $224,263 |
| 5th | (France) Benoit Grobocopatel | €146,320 | $172,506 |
| 6th | (France) Sebastien Seguin | €112,540 | $132,680 |
| 7th | (France) Ilan Cukrowicz | €86,560 | $102,051 |
| 8th | (France) Antoine Labat | €66,570 | $78,483 |

=== (United States) PokerStars Open Philadelphia ===
- Casino: Live! Casino & Hotel, Philadelphia, United States
- Buy-in: $1,100 ($960+100+40) (~€935)
- 8-Day Full Event: Monday, March 16, 2026, to Monday, March 23, 2026
- 5-Day Main Event: Wednesday, March 18, 2026, to Monday, March 23, 2026
- Number of buy-ins: 896
- Guaranteed Prize Pool: $500,000 (~€425,000)
- Total Prize Pool: $860,160 (~€740,752)
- Number of Payouts: 114
- Official Results: The Hendom Mob - PokerStars Open Philadelphia

Final Table
| Place | Name | Original Prize | Prize (€UR) |
|---|---|---|---|
| 1st | (United States) Michael Linster | $126,705 | ~€109,133 |
| 2nd | (United States) Michael Klein | $80,705 | ~€69,501 |
| 3rd | (United States) Jason Raber | $56,400 | ~€48,570 |
| 4th | (France) Thilbaud Martin | $41,400 | ~€35652 |
| 5th | (United States) Jean Brillant | $31,400 | ~€27041 |
| 6th | (Canada) Arlie Shaban | $25,400 | ~€21,873 |
| 7th | (United States) Jason Rivkin | $20,400 | ~€17,568 |
| 8th | (United States) Abel Gebeyehu | $15,900 | ~€13,692 |

=== (Republic of Ireland) Irish Poker Open ===
(Sponsored by PokerStars)

- Casino: Royal Dublin Society, Dublin, Ireland
- Buy-in: €1,250 (€1,100+150) (~$1,475)
- 12-Day Full Event: Thursday, March 26, 2026, to Monday, April 6, 2026
- 9-Day Main Event: Sunday, March 29, 2026, to Monday, April 6, 2026
- Number of buy-ins: 5,003 (2,643 entries + 2,360 re-entries)
- Guaranteed Prize Pool: €2,500,000 (~$2,950,000)
- Total Prize Pool: €4,852,910(~$5,576,775)
- Number of Payouts: 736
- Official Results: The Hendom Mob - Irish Poker Open 2026

Final Table
| Place | Name | Original Prize | Prize (U$D) |
|---|---|---|---|
| 1st | (Romania) Narcis-Gabriel Nedelcu | €336,790* | ~$387,025 |
| 2nd | (Italy) Danilo Donnini | €257,660* | ~$296,092 |
| 3rd | (Ukraine) Vasyl Palandiuk | €255,190* | ~$293,254 |
| 4th | (Northern Ireland) Daryl McAleenan | €250,500* | ~$287,864 |
| 5th | (United States) Oliver Gayko | €285,380* | ~$327,947 |
| 6th | (Italy) Francesco Gisolfi | €105,070 | ~$120,742 |
| 7th | (England) Isaac Barker | €80,800 | ~$92,852 |
| 8th | (Republic of Ireland) Matt Twomey | €62,170 | ~$71,443 |

* denotes five-way ICM deal

=== (Monaco) EPT PokerStars Open Monte Carlo ===
Side Event: PokerStars Open Main Event Monte Carlo (Event #1)

- Casino: Sporting Monte-Carlo, Monte Carlo, Monaco
- Buy-in: €1,650 (€1,440+210) (~$1,945)
- 11-Day Full Event: Thursday, April 30, 2026, to Sunday, May 10, 2026
- 5-Day Main Event: Thursday, April 30, 2026, to Sunday, May 4, 2026
- Number of buy-ins: 1,634 (857 entries + 777 re-entries)
- Total Prize Pool: €2,352,960 (~$2,748,303)
- Number of Payouts: 242
- Official Results: The Hendom Mob - PokerStars Open Monte Carlo

Final Table
| Place | Name | Original Prize | Prize (U$D) |
|---|---|---|---|
| 1st | (Netherlands) Joris Ruijs | €317,398 | ~$370,727 |
| 2nd | (Germany) Leon Sturm | €275,042 | ~$321,254 |
| 3rd | (France) Julien Bolomowski | €162,360 | ~$189,640 |
| 4th | (Greece) Filippos Fragkopoylos | €124,820 | ~$145,792 |
| 5th | (France) Romain Matteoli | €95,780 | ~$111,873 |
| 6th | (Tunisia) Mehdi Rebai | €73,480 | ~$85,826 |
| 7th | (Armenia) Vahe Martirosyan | €57,280 | ~$66,904 |
| 8th | (Uruguay) Gabriel Spósito | €44,040 | ~$51,440 |

=== (Belgium) PokerStars Open Namur ===
- Casino: Circus Casino Resort Namur, Belgium
- Buy-in: €1,100 ($950+100+50) (~$1,283)
- 13-Day Full Event: Wednesday, May 27, 2026, to Sunday, June 7, 2026
- Main Event: Saturday, May 30, 2026, to Sunday, June 7, 2026
- Number of buy-ins: 1,572 (752 entries + 820 re-entries)
- Guaranteed Prize Pool: €1,000,000
- Total Prize Pool: €1,491,828 (~$1,739,964)
- Number of Payouts: 223
- Official Results: The Hendom Mob - PokerStars Open Namur

Final Table
| Place | Name | Original Prize | Prize (U$D) |
|---|---|---|---|
| 1st | (Belgium) Koen De Visscher | €220,800 | ~$257,526 |
| 2nd | (Austria) Henrik Veldhoen | €138,500 | ~$161,537 |
| 3rd | (England) Andrew Hulme | €100,300 | ~$116,983 |
| 4th | (Scotland) David Docherty | €78,000 | ~$90,974 |
| 5th | (Italy) Dario Quattrucci | €60,000 | ~$69,980 |
| 6th | (Netherlands) Stan Van Dijk | €46,000 | ~$53,651 |
| 7th | (France) Nicolas Burtin | €36,000 | ~$41,988 |
| 8th | (France) Sebastien Guinand | €28,000 | ~$32,657 |

=== (Spain) PokerStars Open Málaga ===
- Casino: Gran Madrid Casino Torrequebrada, Málaga, Spain
- Buy-in: €1,100 ($950+100+50) (~$1,249)
- 7-Day Full Event: Monday, June 22, 2026, to Sunday, June 28, 2026
- 5-Day Main Event: Wednesday, June 24, 2026, to Sunday, June 28, 2026
- Number of buy-ins: 1,573 (881 entries + 872 re-entries)
- Guaranteed Prize Pool: €1,000,000
- Total Prize Pool: €1,682,880 (~$1,910,540)
- Number of Payouts: 255
- Official Results: The Hendom Mob - PokerStars Open Malaga

Final Table
| Place | Name | Original Prize | Prize (U$D) |
|---|---|---|---|
| 1st | (Norway) Oskar Bilstad | €178,840* | ~$203,033 |
| 2nd | (Hungary) Dániel Herédi | €175,980* | ~$199,787 |
| 3rd | (Spain) Josep Rebollar | €180,160* | ~$204,532 |
| 4th | (Spain) Francisco Muñiz | €88,700 | ~$100,699 |
| 5th | (South Korea) Min-Guk Kim | €68,300 | ~$77,540 |
| 6th | (France) Herve Gouzil | €52,500 | ~$59,602 |
| 7th | (Italy) Francesco Caramazza | €40,400 | ~$45,865 |
| 8th | (Italy) Gianas Rege | €31,100 | ~$35,307 |

* denotes three-way ICM deal

=== (Spain) EPT PokerStars Open Barcelona ===
Side Event: PokerStars Open Main Event Barcelona

- Casino: Casino Barcelona, Barcelona, Spain
- Buy-in: €1,650 (€1,440+210) (~$1,910)
- 14-Day Full Event: Sunday, August 16, 2026, to Saturday, August 29, 2026
- 7-day Main Event: Sunday, August 16, 2026, to Saturday, August 22, 2026
- Number of buy-ins: 4,333 (1,958 entries + 2,375 re-entries)
- Total Prize Pool: €6,239,520 (~$7,221,332)
- Number of Payouts: 648
- Official Results: The Hendom Mob - PokerStars Open Barcelona

Final Table
| Place | Name | Original Prize | Prize (U$D) |
|---|---|---|---|
| 1st | (United States) Jason Wheeler | €731,000 | ~$846,026 |
| 2nd | (Sweden) Alexander Ivarsson | €457,000 | ~$528,911 |
| 3rd | (Serbia) Darko Svesko | €326,200 | ~$377,529 |
| 4th | (Romania) Bogdan Petrascu | €251,120 | ~$290,635 |
| 5th | (Netherlands) Heskey Selva | €193,190 | ~$223,589 |
| 6th | (United States) Han Feng | €148,610 | ~$171,994 |
| 7th | (Brazil) Felipe Boianovsky | €87,910 | ~$101,743 |
| 8th | (Netherlands) Francisco Morren | €67,630 | ~$78,272 |

=== (France) PokerStars Open Aix-en-Provence ===
- Casino: Casino GRAND, Aix-en-Provence, France
- Buy-in: €1,100 (€960+100+40) (~$1,318)
- 7-Day Full Event: Monday, November 2, 2026, to Sunday, November 8, 2026
- 5-Day Main Event: Wednesday, November 4, 2026, to Sunday, November 8, 2026
- Number of buy-ins: 859 (485 entries + 374 re-entries)
- Total Prize Pool: €824,640 (~$924,163)
- Number of Payouts: 129
- Official Results: The Hendom Mob - PokerStars Open Aix-en-Provence

Final Table
| Place | Name | Original Prize | Prize (U$D) |
|---|---|---|---|
| 1st | (France) Christopher Marcadet | €130,000 | $145,689 |
| 2nd | (Switzerland) John Rezzonico | €87,000 | $97,500 |
| 3rd | (France) Jordan Ayasse | €62,000 | $69,483 |
| 4th | (France) Dinh Nguyen | €45,500 | $50,991 |
| 5th | (Algeria) Omar Lakhdari | €34,000 | $38,103 |
| 6th | (Poland) Krzysztof Zapolski | €26,000 | $29,138 |
| 7th | (France) Laurent Lebar | €20,340 | $22,795 |
| 8th | (France) Arno Peronnet | €16,200 | $18,155 |

=== (Czech Republic) EPT PokerStars Open Prague ===
Side Event: PokerStars Open Main Event Prague

- Casino: Hilton Hotel Prague, Prague, Czech Republic
- Buy-in: €1,650
- 12-Day Full Event: Wednesday, December 2, 2026 to Sunday, December 13, 2026
- 6-Day Main Event: Wednesday, December 2, 2026 to Monday, December 7, 2026
- Number of buy-ins:
- Total Prize Pool:
- Number of Payouts:
- Official Results: The Hendom Mob - PokerStars Open Prague

Final Table
| Place | Name | Original Prize | Prize (U$D) |
|---|---|---|---|
| 1st | | | |
| 2nd | | | |
| 3rd | | | |
| 4th | | | |
| 5th | | | |
| 6th | | | |
| 7th | | | |
| 8th | | | |
