= PokerStars Open season 2025 results =

PokerStars Open 2025
- League: PokerStars Open
- Sport: Poker
- Duration: March 16, 2025 – December 21, 2025
- Total attendance: 27,314(Main Event only)

Statistics
- Countries: Italy - Campione; Ireland - Dublin; United States - Philadelphia; Monaco - Monte Carlo; Belgium - Namur; Spain - Málaga; Spain - Barcelona; Malta - St. Julian's; United States - Hanover; United Kingdom - Manchester; United States - Las Vegas; Czech Republic - Prague; France - Cannes

PokerStars Open seasons
- Season 2026 →

Below are the results of the first season of the PokerStars Open. All currency amounts are in "€" Euro, U$ Dollar (and local currency when apply).

== Results ==
=== (Italy) PokerStars Open Campione ===
- Casino: Casinò di Campione, Campione, Italy
- Buy-in: €1,100 (~$1,199)
- 7-Day Full Event: Monday, March 10, 2025 to Sunday, March 16, 2025
- 5-Day Main Event: Wednesday, March 12, 2025 to Sunday, March 16, 2025
- Number of buy-ins: 2,423 (1,423 entries + 1,000 re-entries)
- Guaranteed Prize Pool: €1,000,000 (~$1,089,573)
- Total Prize Pool: €2,326,080 (~$2,534,436)
- Number of Payouts: 315
- Official Results: The Hendom Mob - PokerStars Open Campione

Final Table
Place	Name	Original Prize	Prize (U$D)
1st	(Romania) Adrian State	€363,000	$395,515
2nd	(Italy) Giorgio Soceanu	€225,200	$245,372
3rd	(Italy) Barnaba Perone	€160,880	$175,290
4th	(Spain) Manel Mantalban	€123,760	$134,845
5th	(Italy) Russo Salvatore	€95,190	$103,716
6th	(Czech Republic) Jakub Štěrba	€73,210	$79,767
7th	(Italy) Gaspare Sposato	€56,330	$61,375
8th	(France) Andreas Puetz	€43,340	$47,222

=== (Republic of Ireland) Irish Poker Open ===
(Sponsored by PokerStars)

- Casino: Royal Dublin Society, Dublin, Ireland
- Buy-in: €1,150 (~$1,307)
- 12-Day Full Event: Thursday, April 10, 2025 to Monday, April 21, 2025
- 9-Day Main Event: Sunday, April 13, 2025 to Monday, April 21, 2025
- Number of buy-ins: 4,562 (2,483 entries + 2,079 re-entries)
- Guaranteed Prize Pool: €2,500,000 (~$2,840,393)
- Total Prize Pool: €4,447,950 (~$5,053,570)
- Number of Payouts: 671
- Official Results: The Hendom Mob - Irish Poker Open 2025

Final Table
Place	Name	Original Prize	Prize (U$D)
1st	(Republic of Ireland) Simon Wilson	€600,000	$681,694
2nd	(Italy) Umberto Ruggeri	€316,000	$359,026
3rd	(Lithuania) Ignotas Kirsis	€225,000	$255,635
4th	(Cyprus) Georgios Skarparis	€170,000	$193,147
5th	(Sweden) Michel Karim	€130,000	$147,700
6th	(England) Brandon Harris	€100,000	$113,616
7th	(Greece) Panteleimon Pontos	€77,500	$88,052
8th	(Romania) Robert Fluereci	€59,030	$67,067

=== (United States) PokerStars Open Philadelphia ===
- Casino: Live! Casino & Hotel, Philadelphia, United States
- Buy-in: $1,100
- 7-Day Full Event: Monday, April 21, 2025 to Sunday, April 27, 2025
- 5-Day Main Event: Wednesday, April 23, 2025 to Sunday, April 27, 2025
- Number of buy-ins: 1,154
- Guaranteed Prize Pool: $500,000
- Total Prize Pool: $1,107,840
- Number of Payouts: 146
- Official Results: The Hendom Mob - PokerStars Open Philadelphia

Final Table
Place	Name	Original Prize	Prize (€UR)
1st	(United States) Edward Leonard	$147,806*	€129,400*
2nd	(United States) Guan Huang	$126,507*	€110,754*
3rd	(United States) Frank Funaro	$125,708*	€110,054*
4th	(United States) William Beer	$62,760	€54,945
5th	(United States) Adam Agaev	$47,415	€41,511
6th	(United States) Norman Rogers	$38,330	€33,557
7th	(United States) Dan McGinnis	$31,660	€27,717
8th	(United States) Michael Bohmerwald	$25,095	€21,970

* = denotes 3-way deal

=== (Monaco) EPT PokerStars Open Monte Carlo ===
Side Event: PokerStars Open Main Event Monte Carlo (Event #1)

- Casino: Sporting Monte-Carlo, Monte Carlo, Monaco
- Buy-in: €1,100
- 11-Day Full Event: Wednesday, April 30, 2025 to Saturday, May 10, 2025
- 5-Day Main Event: Wednesday, April 30, 2025 to Sunday, May 4, 2025
- Number of buy-ins: 2,387 (1,198 entries + 1,189 re-entries)
- Total Prize Pool: €2,291,520 (~$2,610,824)
- Number of Payouts: 358
- Official Results: The Hendom Mob - PokerStars Open Monte Carlo

Final Table
Place	Name	Original Prize	Prize (U$D)
1st	(Norway) Jon Kyte	€340,000	$387,376
2nd	(France) Gilles Cadignan	€214,070	$243,899
3rd	(Republic of Ireland) Conor Bergin	€153,330	$174,695
4th	(Romania) Scutaru Razvan	€117,720	$134,123
5th	(Spain) Javier Tazón	€89,320	$101,766
6th	(United States) Jack Corrigan	€70,240	$80,027
7th	(Ukraine) Pavlo Bilonozhko	€54,030	$61,559
8th	(Czech Republic) Patrik Jaros	€41,370	$47,135

=== (Belgium) PokerStars Open Namur ===
- Casino: Circus Casino Resort Namur, Belgium
- Buy-in: €1,100
- 13-Day Full Event: Wednesday, May 28, 2025 to Monday, June 9, 2025
- 9-Day Main Event: Friday, May 31, 2025 to Sunday, June 8, 2025
- Number of buy-ins: 1,572 (827 entries + 745 re-entries)
- Guaranteed Prize Pool: €1,000,000
- Total Prize Pool: €1,493,400 (~$1,694,734)
- Number of Payouts: 223
- Official Results: The Hendom Mob - PokerStars Open Namur

Final Table
Place	Name	Original Prize	Prize (U$D)
1st	(France) Jean-Vincent Lehut	€238,000	$270,086
2nd	(Slovakia) Jozef Cibicek	€153,500	$174,194
3rd	(England) Jason Barton	€109,620	$124,399
4th	(Belgium) Ferdinando D'Alessio	€84,320	$95,688
5th	(France) Ramdhane Maamar	€64,830	$73,570
6th	(Bolivia) Evert Rosseel	€49,950	$56,684
7th	(France) Julien Breuil	€38,410	$43,588
8th	(Netherlands) Jort Hagedoorn	€29,580	$33,568

=== (Spain) PokerStars Open Málaga ===
- Casino: Gran Madrid Casino Torrequebrada, Málaga, Spain
- Buy-in: €1,100
- 7-Day Full Event: Monday, June 16, 2025 to Sunday, June 22, 2025
- 5-Day Main Event: Wednesday, June 18, 2025 to Sunday, June 22, 2025
- Number of buy-ins: 1,636 (944 entries + 692 re-entries)
- Guaranteed Prize Pool: €1,000,000
- Total Prize Pool: €1,575,560 (~$1,817,255)
- Number of Payouts: 240
- Official Results: The Hendom Mob - PokerStars Open Malaga

Final Table
Place	Name	Original Prize	Prize (U$D)
1st	(Italy) Manuel Ferrari	€206,300	$237,947
2nd	(Italy) Ermanno Di Nicola	€188,360	$217,255
3rd	(Norway) Morten Lie	€109,200	$125,952
4th	(Denmark) Jorgen Andersen	€84,000	$96,886
5th	(Spain) Fernando Quintana	€64,600	$74,510
6th	(Norway) Linda Nguyen	€49,700	$57,324
7th	(United States) Davis Harari	€38,200	$44,060
8th	(Finland) Joel Haapio	€29,400	$33,910

=== (Spain) EPT PokerStars Open Barcelona ===
Side Event: PokerStars Open Main Event Barcelona

- Casino: Casino Barcelona, Barcelona, Spain
- Buy-in: €1,650
- 14-Day Full Event: Monday, August 18, 2025 to Sunday, August 31, 2025
- 7-Day Main Event: Monday, August 18, 2025 to Sunday, August 24, 2025
- Number of buy-ins: 5,036 (2,286 entries + 2,750 re-entries)
- Total Prize Pool: €7,251,840 (~$8,491,318)
- Number of Payouts: 753
- Official Results: The Hendom Mob - PokerStars Open Barcelona

Final Table
Place	Name	Original Prize	Prize (U$D)
1st	(France) Alexis Nicolai	€772,000	$903,950
2nd	(China) Mengshi Tian	€482,290	$564,723
3rd	(Germany) Ben Zech	€344,560	$403,452
4th	(Malaysia) Chin Lim	€265,200	$310,528
5th	(Italy) Daniele Cuomo	€203,910	$238,762
6th	(Czech Republic) Jakub Štěrba	€156,830	$183,635
7th	(Japan) Kazuhiko Yotsushika	€120,610	$141,225
8th	(France) Joseph David	€92,770	$108,626

=== EPT PokerStars Open Malta ===
Side Event: PokerStars Open Main Event Malta

- Casino: InterContinental Malta, St. Julian's, Malta
- Buy-in: €1,650
- 14-Day Full Event: Wednesday, October 1, 2025 to Sunday, October 12, 2025
- 6-Day Main Event: Wednesday, October 1, 2025 to Monday, October 6, 2025
- Number of buy-ins: 1,845 (838 entries + 1,007 re-entries)
- Total Prize Pool: €2,656,800 (~$3,118,493)
- Number of Payouts: 277
- Official Results: The Hendom Mob - PokerStars Open Malta

Final Table
Place	Name	Original Prize	Prize (U$D)
1st	(England) Scott Margereson	€423,700	$497,330
2nd	(Spain) Gerard Carbó	€264,650	$310,640
3rd	(Belarus) Siarhei Sochneu	€188,900	$221,727
4th	(Latvia) Evaldas Aniulis	€145,350	$170,609
5th	(Italy) Donato De Bonis	€111,850	$131,287
6th	(Germany) Modar Alsoud	€86,500	$101,532
7th	(Spain) Ana Marquez	€65,950	$77,411
8th	(England) Barny Boatman	€50,700	$59,511

=== (United States) PokerStars Open Maryland ===
- Casino: Live! Casino & Hotel Hanover / MD, United States
- Buy-in: $1,100
- 8-Day Full Event: Sunday, October 19, 2025 to Sunday, October 26, 2025
- 5-Day Main Event: Wednesday, October 22, 2025 to Sunday, October 26, 2025
- Number of buy-ins: 599
- Guaranteed Prize Pool: $300,000
- Total Prize Pool: $581,030
- Number of Payouts: 91
- Official Results: The Hendom Mob - PokerStars Open Maryland

Final Table
Place	Name	Original Prize	Prize (€UR)
1st	(United States) Charles Furey	$111,976	€96,215
2nd	(United States) Melanie Hennigan	$70,014	€60,159
3rd	(United States) Arthur Zabronsky	$50,032	€42,990
4th	(United States) Paul Lilly	$38,505	€33,085
5th	(United States) Frankie Zeta	$29,638	€25,466
6th	(Germany) Torsten Boker	$22,817	€19,605
7th	(United States) Samuel Press	$17,564	€15,092
8th	(United States) Andy Bartalone	$13,526	€11,622

=== (England) PokerStars Open Manchester ===
- Casino: The Manchester Deansgate Hotel, Manchester, England
- Buy-in: £1,100
- 7-Day Full Event: Monday, October 20, 2025 to Sunday, October 26, 2025
- 5-Day Main Event: Wednesday, October 22, 2025 to Sunday, October 26, 2025
- Number of buy-ins: 927 (511 entries + 416 re-entries)
- Guaranteed Prize Pool: £1,000,000
- Total Prize Pool: £1,000,000 (~$1,338,312)
- Number of Payouts: 135
- Official Results: The Hendom Mob - PokerStars Open Manchester

Final Table
Place	Name	Original Prize	Prize (€UR)	Prize (U$D)
1st	(England) Tuan Le	£149,200	€180,830	$199,676
2nd	(England) Christopher Brammer	£134,200	€162,650	$179,601
3rd	(England) Hasmukh Khodiyara	£77,860	€94,366	$104,200
4th	(Sweden) Adam Andersson	£59,890	€72,587	$80,151
5th	(England) Mohamed Kerkeni	£46,070	€55,837	$61,656
6th	(England) Sinead Davenport	£35,440	€42,954	$47,429
7th	(Romania) Iulian Petrache	£27,260	€33,039	$36,482
8th	(England) Ravi Sheth	£20,970	€25,415	$28,064

=== (United States) NAPT PokerStars Open Las Vegas ===
Side Event: PokerStars Open Main Event Las Vegas (Event #1)

- Casino: Resorts World Las Vegas / NV, United States
- Buy-in: $1,100
- 10-Day Full Event: Monday, November 3, 2025 to Wednesday, November 12, 2025
- 4-Day Main Event: Monday, November 3, 2025 to Thursday, November 6, 2025
- Number of buy-ins: 947 (510 entries + 437 re-entries)
- Guaranteed Prize Pool: $500,000
- Total Prize Pool: $909,120
- Number of Payouts: 135
- Official Results: The Hendom Mob - PokerStars Open Las Vegas

Final Table
Place	Name	Original Prize	Prize (€UR)
1st	(Russia) Nikolai Mamut	$158,700	€138,808
2nd	(United States) Terrance Reid	$99,090	€86,670
3rd	(United States) James Collopy	$70,780	€61,908
4th	(England) Toby Lewis	$54,450	€47,625
5th	(Norway) Jon Kyte	$41,880	€36,631
6th	(United States) Andrew King	$32,220	€28,181
7th	(England) Marc Foggin	$24,780	€21,674
8th	(China) Yifan Tang	$19,060	€16,671

=== (Czech Republic) EPT PokerStars Open Prague ===
Side Event: PokerStars Open Main Event Prague

- Casino: Hilton Hotel Prague, Prague, Czech Republic
- Buy-in: €1,650
- 13-Day Full Event: Wednesday, December 3, 2025 to Sunday, December 14, 2025
- 6-Day Main Event: Wednesday, December 3, 2025 to Monday, December 8, 2025
- Number of buy-ins: 3,024 (1,411 entries + 1,613 re-entries)
- Total Prize Pool: €4,354,560 (~$5,056,915)
- Number of Payouts: 454
- Official Results: The Hendom Mob - PokerStars Open Prague

Final Table
Place	Name	Original Prize	Prize (U$D)
1st	(Bulgaria) Yulian Bogdanov	€398,135	$462,351
2nd	(Poland) Adrian Ziemichod	€440,110	$511,096
3rd	(Bulgaria) Ivan Poroliev	€440,110	$428,232
4th	(Sweden) Simon Löfberg	€200,000	$232,258
5th	(Austria) Matthias Auer	€200,000	$178,839
6th	(Israel) Ben Hurwitz	€118,380	$137,474
7th	(Italy) Lulei Hu	€91,000	$105,678
8th	(Italy) Amato Landi	€69,980	$81,267

=== (France) PokerStars Open Cannes ===
- Casino: Casino Barriere Le Croisette, Cannes, France
- Buy-in: €1,100
- 7-Day Full Event: Monday, December 15, 2025 to Sunday, December 21, 2025
- 5-Day Main Event: Wednesday, December 17, 2025 to Sunday, December 21, 2025
- Number of buy-ins: 1,202 (706 entries + 496 re-entries)
- Guaranteed Prize Pool: €1,000,000
- Total Prize Pool: €1,153,920 (~$1,356,898)
- Number of Payouts: 175
- Official Results: The Hendom Mob - PokerStars Open Cannes

Final Table
Place	Name	Original Prize	Prize (U$D)
1st	(France) Paul Tedeschi	€195,700	$230,124
2nd	(Russia) Nikolai Mamut	€122,410	$143,942
3rd	(France) Kamel Atoui	€87,430	$102,809
4th	(France) Axel Bayout	€67,250	$79,080
5th	(France) Julien Sitbon	€51,730	$60,829
6th	(Spain) Adria Dalmau	€39,790	$46,789
7th	(France) Michel Marcone	€30,600	$35,983
8th	(Italy) Gianfranco ironico	€23,540	$27,681
