= PokerStars Open =

Poker tournament in Europe

- Sport: Texas Hold 'em
- Founded: 2025
- First season: 2025
- CEO: Cédric Billot
- Continent: Europe / North America
- Qualification: Online at PokerStars
- Sponsor: PokerStars
- Website: pokerstarslive.com/pokerstarsopen/
- 2025

Notes
- PokerStars Open replaces: UKIPT, ESPT, FPS and EUREKA

The PokerStars Open is a series of European poker tournaments, launching in 2025, organised by PokerStars. The formation of the new European tour was announced in December 2024. Each festival will be headed by a €1,100 open main event with a €1,000,000 guaranteed prize pool.

The PokerStars Open replaces the ESPT - Estrellas Poker Tour, Eureka Poker Tour, FPS - France Poker Series, and UKIPT - UK and Ireland Poker Tour.

== Tournament results ==
=== Season 2025 ===
For the first season, PokerStars Open will have tournaments as side events at EPT Monte Carlo, EPT Barcelona, EPT Malta, EPT Prague. The Irish Open is a sponsored tournament by PokerStars.

In March, 2025 PokerStars announced the PokerStars Open Philadelphia, United States.

In May, 2025 PokerStars announced the North American Poker Tour 2025 in Las Vegas with two PokerStars Open tournaments, Main Event and High Roller.

Irish Open Main event sponsored by PokerStars
PokerStars Open Main event (as side event) played at European Poker Tour
PokerStars Open Main event (as side event) played at North American Poker Tour

Date	Event / City	Players	Prize Pool	Winner	Prize	Results
10–16 March	(Italy) PokerStars Open Campione €1,100; Casinò di Campione, Italy; Prizepool Guaranteed €1,000,000	2,423	€2,326,080	(Romania) Adrian State	€363,000	
10-21 April	(Republic of Ireland) Irish Poker Open €1,150; Royal Dublin Society, Dublin, Ireland; Prizepool Guaranteed €2,500,000	4,562	€4,447,950	(Republic of Ireland) Simon Wilson	€600,000	
21-27 April	(United States) PokerStars Open Philadelphia $1,100; Live! Casino & Hotel, Philadelphia, United States; Prizepool Guaranteed $500,000	1,154	$1,107,840	(United States) Edward Leonard	$147,805*	
30 April-4 May	EPT/PokerStars Open Monte Carlo €1,100; Sporting Monte-Carlo, Monte Carlo, Monaco	2,387	€2,291,520	(Norway) Jon Kyte	€340,000	
28 May-9 June	(Belgium) PokerStars Open Namur €1,100; Belgian Poker Challenge; Circus Casino Resort Namur, Belgium; Prizepool Guaranteed €1,000,000	1,572	€1,493,400	(France) Jean-Vincent Lehut	€238,000	
16–22 June	(Spain) PokerStars Open Málaga €1,100; Gran Madrid Casino Torrequebrada, Málaga, Spain; Prizepool Guaranteed €1,000,000	1,636	€1,575,560	(Italy) Manuel Ferrari	€206,300	
18–24 August	EPT/PokerStars Open Barcelona €1,100; Casino Barcelona, Barcelona, Spain	5,036	€7,251,840	(France) Alexis Nicolai	€772,000	
1-12 October	EPT/PokerStars Open Malta €1,100; InterContinental Malta, St. Julian's, Malta	1,845	€2,656,800	(England) Scott Margereson	€423,700	
19–26 October	(United States) PokerStars Open Maryland $1,100; Live! Casino & Hotel, Hanover / MD; Prizepool Guaranteed $300,000	599	$581,030	(United States) Charles Furey	$111,976	
20–26 October	(England) PokerStars Open Manchester £1,100; Casino Manchester235, Manchester, England; Prizepool Guaranteed £1,000,000	927	£1,000,000	(England) Tuan Le	£149,200	
3-6 November	(United States) NAPT/PokerStars Open Las Vegas $1,100; Resorts World, Las Vegas / NV; Prizepool Guaranteed $500,000	947	$909,120	(Russia) Nikolai Mamut	$158,700	
3-14 December	EPT/PokerStars Open Prague €1,100; Hilton Hotel Prague, Prague, Czech Republic	3,024	€4,354,560	(Bulgaria) Yulian Bogdanov	€398,135	
8–14 December	(France) PokerStars Open Cannes €1,100; Casino Barriere Le Croisette, Cannes, France; Prizepool Guaranteed €1,000,000	1,202	€1,153,920	(France) Paul Tedeschi	€195,700	

* = denote in deal

=== Season 2026 ===
In August, 2026 PokerStars announced the return of the PokerStars Open Campione – the start of the PokerStars Open 2026 season. EPT Paris and EPT Monte Carlo already announces PokerStars Open side Events

Irish Open Main event sponsored by PokerStars
PokerStars Open Main event (as side event) played at European Poker Tour

Date	Event / City	Players	Prize Pool	Winner	Prize	Results
23 January-1 February	(Italy) PokerStars Open Campione €1,100; Casinò di Campione, Italy; Prizepool Guaranteed €1,000,000	1,582	€1,518,720	(Switzerland) Elvir Nuhiu	€200,640*	
18 February-1 March	EPT/PokerStars Open Paris €1,650; Palais des congrès de Paris, Paris, France	2,992	€4,308,480	(Hungary) Patrik Demus	€551,090	
16-23 March	(United States) PokerStars Open Philadelphia $1,100; Live! Casino & Hotel, Philadelphia, United States; Prizepool Guaranteed $500,000	896	$860,160	(United States) Michael Linster	$126,705	
26 March-6 April	(Republic of Ireland) Irish Poker Open €1,150; Royal Dublin Society, Dublin, Ireland; Prizepool Guaranteed €2,500,000	5,003	€4,852,910	(Romania) Narcis-Gabriel Nedelcu	€336,790*	
30 April-10 May	EPT/PokerStars Open Monte Carlo €1,650; Sporting Monte-Carlo, Monte Carlo, Monaco	1,634	€2,352,960	(Netherlands) Joris Ruijs	€317,398	
27 May-7 June	(Belgium) PokerStars Open Namur €1,100; Circus Casino Resort Namur, Belgium; Prizepool Guaranteed €1,000,000	1,572	€1,491,828	(Belgium) Koen De Visscher	€220,800	
22–28 June	(Spain) PokerStars Open Málaga €1,100; Gran Madrid Casino Torrequebrada, Málaga, Spain; Prizepool Guaranteed €1,000,000	1,753	€1,682,880	(Norway) Oskar Bilstad	€178,840	
16–29 August	EPT/PokerStars Open Barcelona €1,650; Casino Barcelona, Barcelona, Spain	4,333	€6,239,520	(United States) Jason Wheeler	€731,000	
2-8 November	PokerStars Open Aix-en-Provence €1,100; Pasino GRAND, Aix-en-Provence, France	859	€824,640	(France) Christopher Marcadet	€130,000	
2-7 December	EPT/PokerStars Open Prague €1,650; Hilton Hotel Prague, Prague, Czech Republic					+info

* = Denote deal
** More venues To Be Announce
