= Prague Student Summit =

Educational project for high school and university students

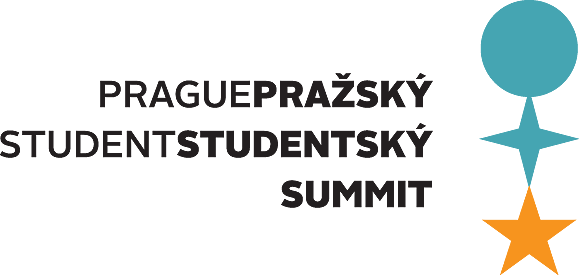
- Logo

Summit in numbers
- Number of participants: 300
- Number of represented states: 84
- Number of organizers: 66
- Number of seasons: 30

Simulated institutions
- UNSC; ILO; HRC; UNEA; DISEC; WHO; NATO; EU; G20

Official languages
- Czech, English (NATO)

Time frame
- Annually from September to April

Website of the project
- Prague Student Summit

Prague Student Summit (PSS) (Czech: Pražský studentský summit) is an educational project for high school and university students, which has more than 20 years of tradition in the Czech Republic. Through simulation of negotiations of international organizations, the participants have the opportunity to widen their knowledge in fields like international affairs, human rights, economy, cultural heritage and environment. At the same time, they can develop their rhetorical, presentation and argumentation skills. The Prague Student Summit gives the participants a unique opportunity to get a glimpse of the world of diplomacy and international relations. It is a project that endorses the idea of informal education, puts emphasis on the development of individual and this way complements the education in Czech schools.

Over the years, the format of the Prague Student Summit developed considerably; today it offers simulations of 3 key organizations: UN, NATO, EU and G20. The participants in each model defend the interests of the states they represent and negotiate in the same way as real representatives of individual countries would. Within the agenda of individual bodies, the delegates deal with the current problems that the international community tackles.

The preparatory team that prepares the PSS every year consists of more than 60 university students, usually picked from the group of former participants of the Summit. The organizer of the project is Association for International Affairs, a non-governmental and non-profit organization established in 1997 for the purpose of research and education in the field of international relations.

In the past, Prague Summit Student was taken under patronage by such personalities as Václav Havel, Karel Schwarzenberg, Petr Pithart, Madeleine Albright or Kateřina Valachová.

== Progress of the project ==
The year of the Prague Student Summit is divided into two main parts – the preparatory stage and the Final conference.

During the academic year, five preparatory meetings take place at the Faculty of Law, Charles University. Their purpose is to prepare the participants not only for the Final conference, but also to develop their expert knowledge and soft skills. Here, delegates impersonate the roles of diplomats, learn to discuss, take a stand and formulate an opinion, for which they are trying to get the support of their peers. An integral part of these preparatory meetings are lectures, panel discussions with interesting guests and interactive activities to develop the skills and abilities of the students.

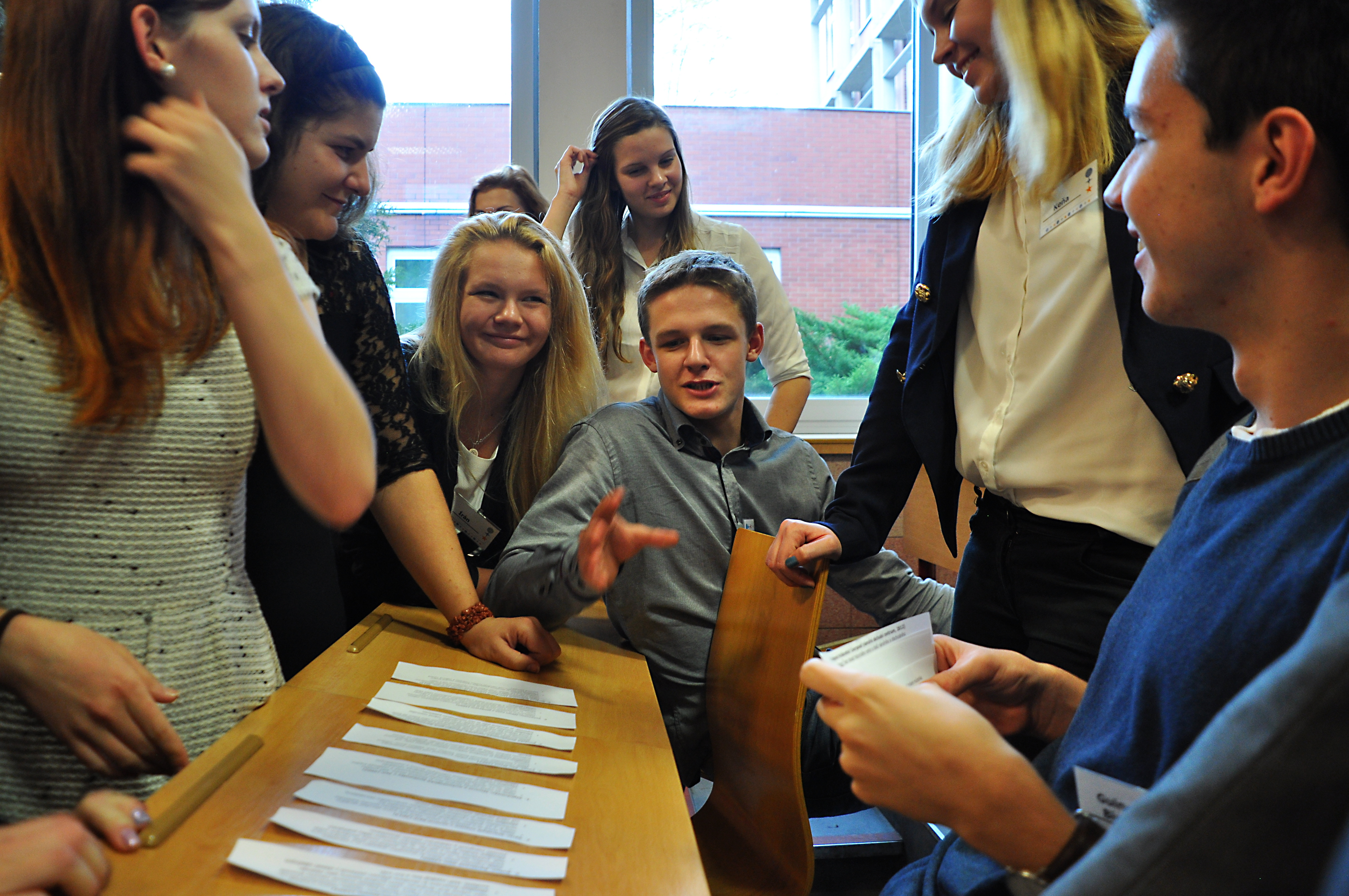
Participants of the XXI season

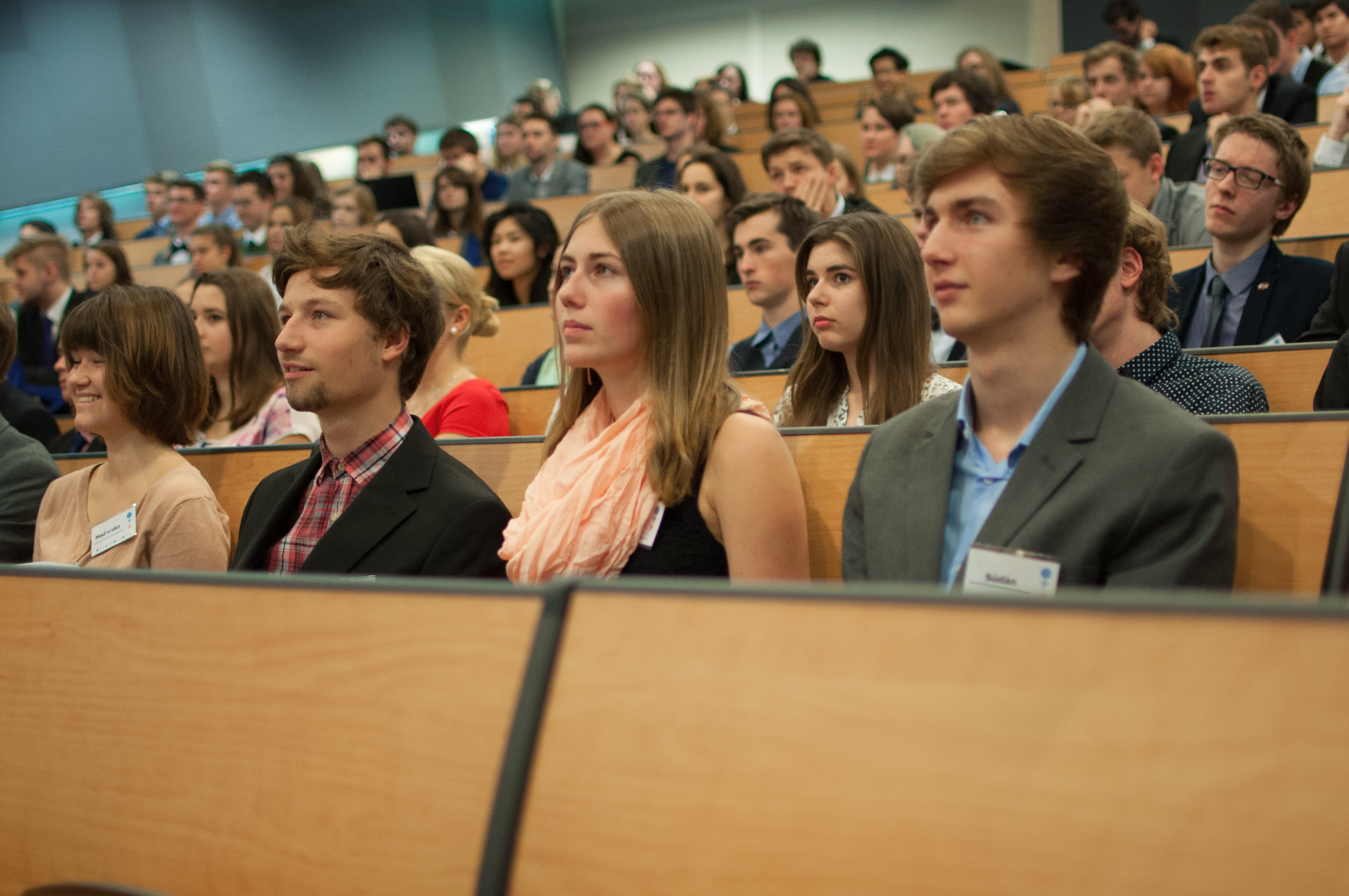
Participants of the XXI season during morning programme of the preparatory meeting

The Final conference traditionally takes place in the spring. The Opening ceremony has been attended by guests from the project partners, diplomats, politicians and media representatives. In recent years, its venue has been, for example, the Prague Castle Ball Room, the Czernin Palace, the Ambassador Hotel or the Hilton Prague. The actual negotiations take place as usual in the Prague Congress Centre. Thereby, Students have a unique occasion to meet with guests such as Petr Pavel, Michal Horáček, Erik Tabery and many others who have already visited the Prague Student Summit.

Among other things, the project is enriched by a wide range of accompanying events that are held throughout the year. In the past, for instance, students attended a reception in the residence of the Mayor of Prague and traveled to Brussels, Vienna, Geneva and Strasbourg on a tour of the actual seats of the simulated organizations. Before the beginning of Final conference, participants also have the opportunity to visit the embassies of states which they represent in the project.

Within the XXII season of the PSS, a new project "Prague Student Summit arrives to the regions" is organized. The aim is to show the activities of the UN Security Council to students of 8th and 9th grades of primary schools in different regions.

== Project goals ==
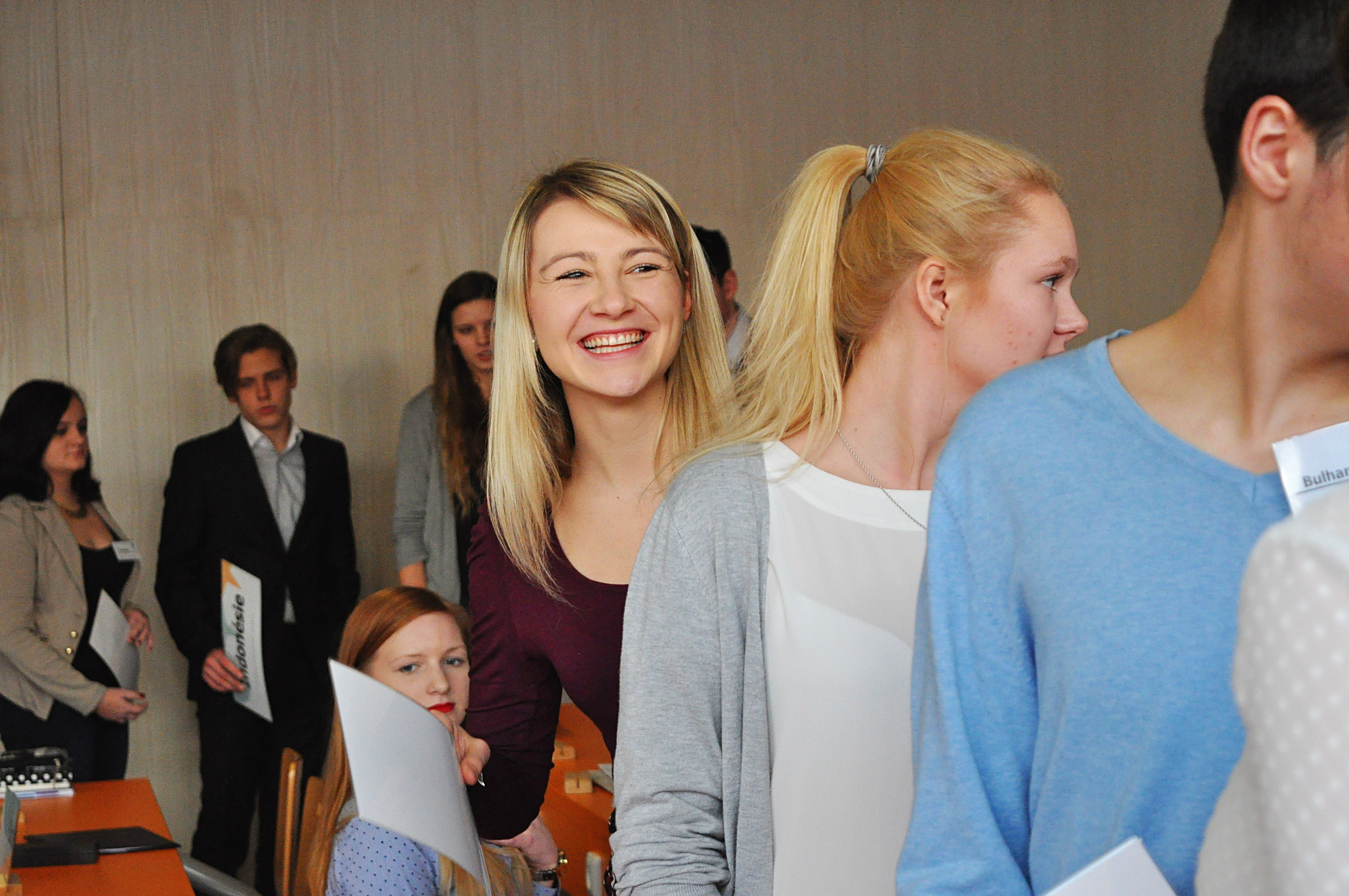
Participants of the XXI season

The main goal of the project is to develop knowledge, skills and abilities of its participants; this applies not only to high-school and university students taking the roles of diplomats, but members of the PSS's preparatory team as well. The project's participant carries off new insights, perfects soft skills and forms critical and analytical thinking. The project is open to all applicants regardless their interests and career plans, for it focuses on gaining competences which can be utilized in everyday life just as in any other field of human activity.

== The Pillars of the Prague Student Summit ==
=== The Model UN ===
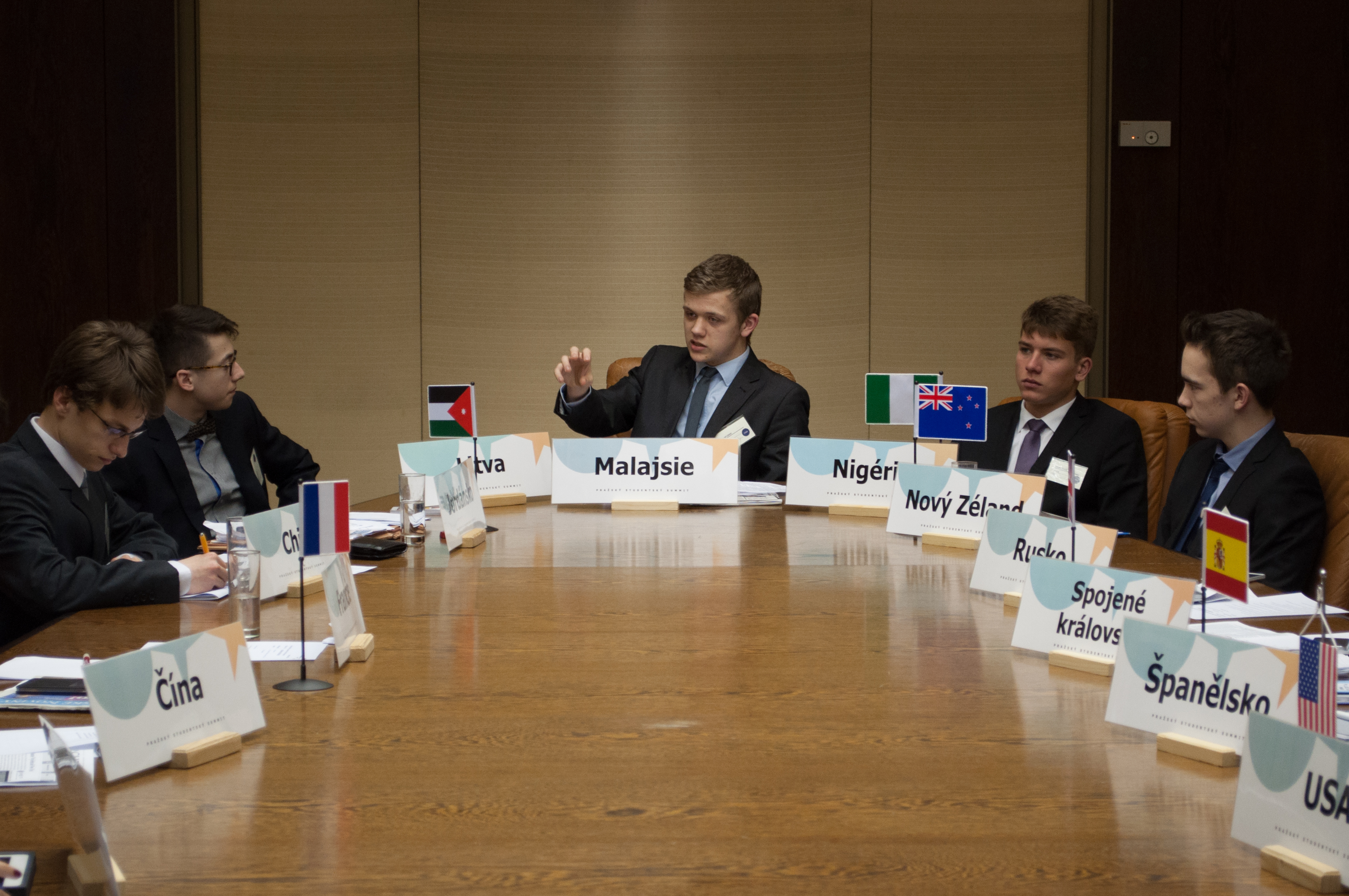
Model UN

The Model of the United Nations is a project with a long tradition. More than 300 high school students represent the UN member states in its structures. Along with the new skills and knowledge the model introduces students to fundamental ideas and goals of this largest international organisation, such as the will to solve global conflict with diplomacy and pursuit of a more just International Order. The Model UN offers students an opportunity to experience the world of diplomacy through a simulated negotiation in seven bodies: United Nations Security Council (UNSC) Disarmament and International Security Committee (DISEC), International Labour Organisation (ILO), Human Rights Council (HRC), World Health Organisation (WHO), United Nations Environment Assembly (UNEA).

=== The Model NATO ===
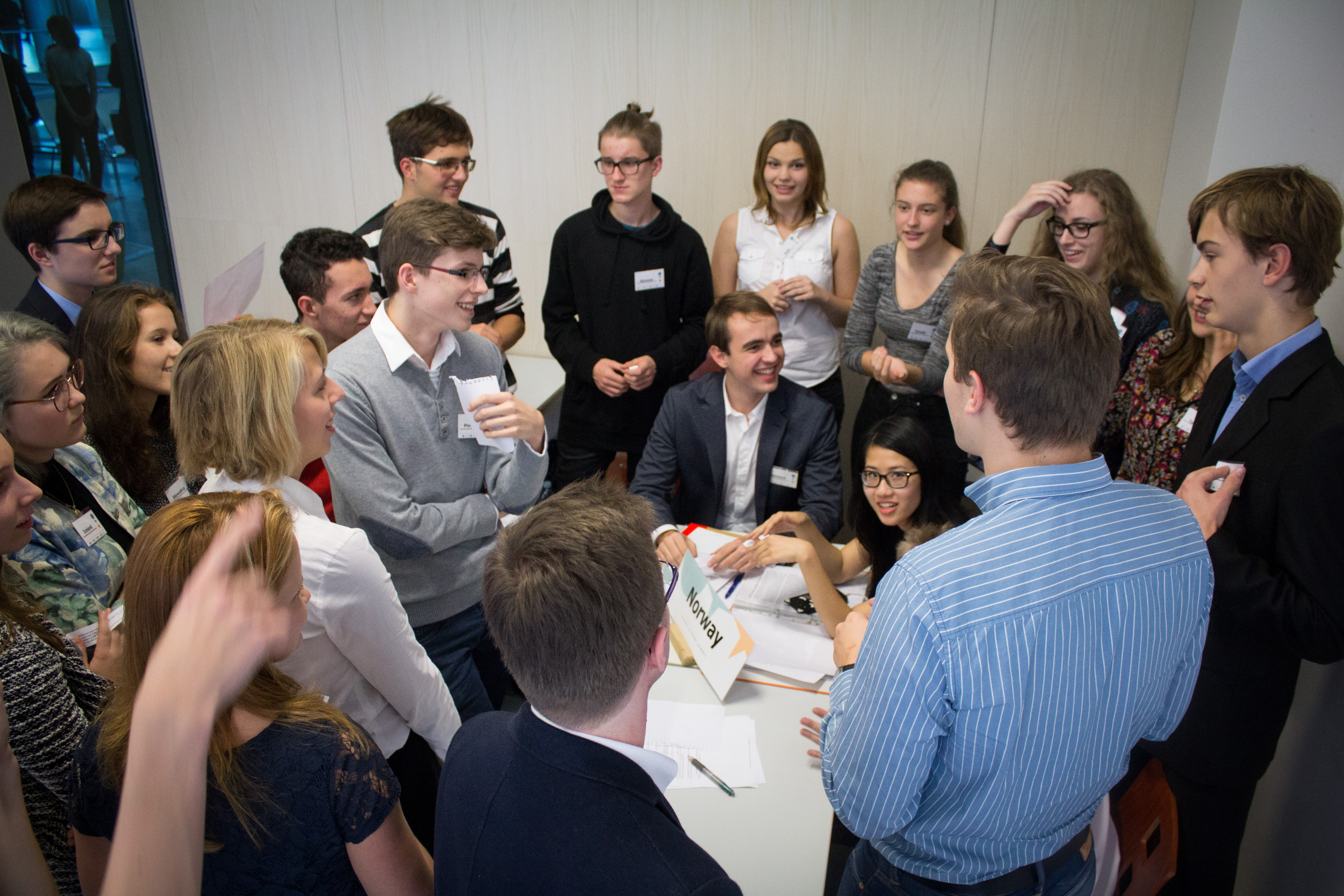
Model NATO

The Model NATO simulates the negotiation of the principal political body of the Alliance - the North Atlantic Council. It is too intended for high school students although the negotiation is run in English. That brings a new dimension to the educational activities and represents an additional challenge for delegates and the opportunity to improve their language skills. Student in a role of the member state diplomat will be occupied with the key security issues and the North Atlantic Treaty Organization's global standing.

=== The Model EU ===
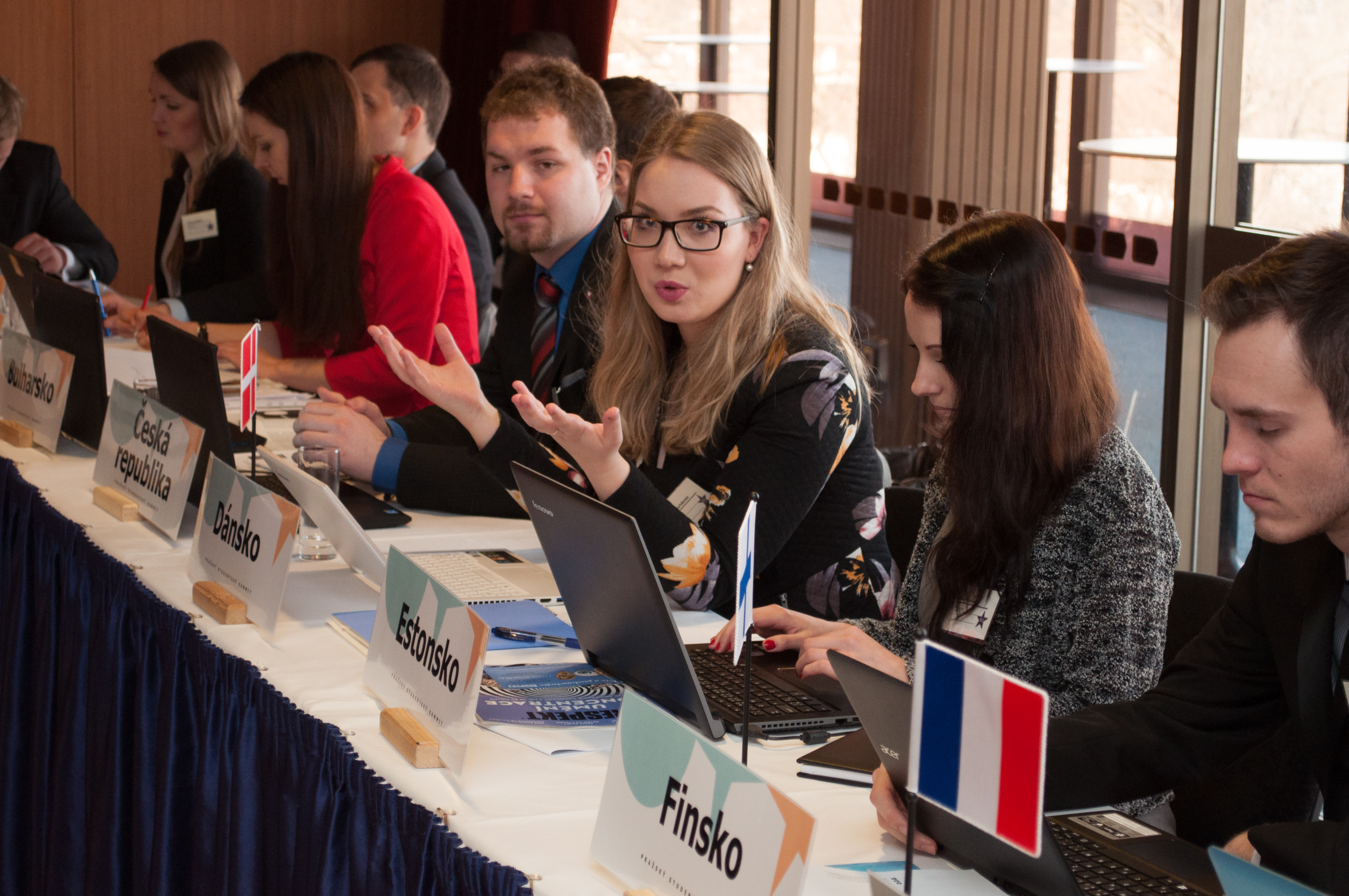
Model EU

The Model of the European Union is designed for university students who as ministers of member states simulate sessions of the key institution in the EU structure, the Council of the European Union. Model's goal is to show the operation of the council as authentically as possible by updating its agenda with current topics. Besides negotiating, the programme is constituted by discussions and seminars with prominent Czech and foreign experts, including diplomats and politicians accustomed to the EU surroundings.

=== The Model G20 ===
The model of Group of Twenty has been part of the project since 2022, thus being the youngest model simulated. The participants work in couples, therefore they are bound to cooperate more, in order to effectively enforce their politics. The model of G20 mainly discuss economical themes, which are due to their complexity separated into two subthemes. Each participant from the delegation then explore one of those subthemes and its connection to the country they represent and share their knowledge with their co-delegate.

== Chronicle ==
The Chronicle, the official newspapers of Prague Student Summit, are inseparably linked to the project from its very beginning. Every year, the first edition of the Chronicle is published at the time of start of the admission process, and following editions are available at every preparatory meeting and throughout the conference days. Their electronic version is also available for download at the PSS's website. Archive. The Chronicle brings not only detailed coverage of activities of all Models and bodies, organizational information and information about accompanying events, but interviews with important personalities, too. Through expert columns, the newspapers provide participants with insights into the world of politics, law, economics and recent events on the field of international relations. The editorial staff consists mainly of the project's preparatory team members, but offers space to the participants as well.

== About organizer ==
The project is prepared by students for students, with former participants usually becoming the organizers. This unique feature ensures the continuity as well as constant inflow of new ideas and approaches. The project's organizer is a non-governmental non-profit organization Association for International Affairs (AMO), which was founded in 1997 with an aim of research and education on the field of international relations. This leading Czech think-tank is not linked to any political party or ideology. AMO provides space for a development of education, understanding and tolerance among people and cultures and intermediates a dialogue among representatives of broad public, academic sphere, civil sector, politics and business. With its activities, it consistently supports a pro-active approach of citizens of the Czech Republic towards international politics and provides information necessary for forming one's own opinion on both domestic and foreign events.
