= Armand Ceritano =

Italian-born American businessman (1931–1990)

- Ceritano in 1977
- Born: May 4, 1931; Castel Castagna, Abruzzi, Italy
- Died: May 2, 1990 (aged 58); Woodbury, New Jersey, U.S.
- Resting place: Holy Cross Cemetery (Yeadon, Pennsylvania)
- Occupation: Businessman
- Years active: 1960s–1970s
- Known for: Ceritano Wines
- Spouse: Frances (m. 1952)
- Children: 3

Armando Ceritano (May 4, 1931 – May 2, 1990) was an Italian-born American businessman. He moved to the U.S. at age 17 and settled in Philadelphia, Pennsylvania, where he began working in construction. He eventually started his own bricklaying business and in the 1970s, he entered the wine business. He became known for his Ceritano Wines advertisements which were frequently featured on television in the Philadelphia-area. In 1976, he became the owner of the Philadelphia Hilton Inn; however, within a few years, he had to declare for bankruptcy and lost the hotel and his business.

== Early life ==
Ceritano was born on May 4, 1931, in Castel Castagna, in the Abruzzi region of Italy. He was the youngest of five brothers (Note: The Philadelphia Inquirer, in their obituary on Ceritano, stated he had three brothers, although he actually had four.) and spent his early years as a shepherd. Ceritano's father worked as a stonemason. The Courier-Post noted that in Italy, "His shelter was a crude hut. His food was basic bread and wine. His entertainment was a homemade whistle." In 1948, when he was 17, he immigrated to the United States, settling in Philadelphia, Pennsylvania. He told The Philadelphia Inquirer that he arrived with no money and "came wearing a suit purchased with 30 days of harvesting wheat and 20 pounds of beans, and [carried] a cardboard suitcase that had cost 10 days of harvesting wheat." Only having a fifth-grade education, he was unable to speak English at the time and later said that "My only capital in Italy was a goat."

Following his arrival, Ceritano decided to become a tailor, after "seeing many fields, but no sheep." He said that he found someone to work with, "but do you know, he wanted to charge me for the electricity! I told him I learn for four days and then I work another four days to pay him."

== Career ==
=== Early career ===
Ceritano became a full-time tailor and while working, saved up enough money and bought a dry goods store. Soon after, he began working in construction, being a part-time employee for a contractor. He eventually started his own bricklaying business, reported in The Philadelphia Inquirer as occurring within four years of his arrival in the U.S., while the Courier-Post stated that it was "by 1960." He received several government contracts and constructed houses in Springfield Township, Delaware County, Pennsylvania. With money earned from the business, he paid for several of his brothers (Note: The Philadelphia Inquirer reported that he paid for each of his brothers to move to the U.S., while, according to the Courier-Post, one of his brothers had already moved by the time Ceritano immigrated.) to move to the U.S. as well. He lost a significant amount of money during a 1964 project, but within a few years, had "regroup[ed]" and become "a bona fide businessman with a bankroll to match," according to the Courier-Post.

Ceritano was also an "opera enthusiast." He was on the board of directors for the Suburban Opera Company and later served as president of the Philadelphia Grand Opera Company. He helped lead the merger of the Philadelphia Grand Opera Company with the rival Philadelphia Lyric Opera Company to form the Philadelphia Opera Company, which Ceritano then was vice president of. While on a trip to Italy in 1969, he noticed the singing of tenor Walter Rinaldi in a restaurant, which he called the "best since [Mario] Lanza." After convincing Rinaldi, Ceritano "brought him to America, sent him to school, and formed a one-man production and record company," according to The Inquirer. Ceritano was manager for Rinaldi during his career and he started Ceritano Enterprises to handle "the promotion end" for Rinaldi.

By 1972, Ceritano was handling "more than $10 million worth of bricklaying and masonry contracts a year" in Pennsylvania and New Jersey. In 1973, he started S&C Investors, Inc., to build a housing development called Northwoods in Cherry Hill, New Jersey. He planned to build 101 houses in the community. The Inquirer noted that "It was swampy land, and the sale was made conditional upon Cherry Hill's agreeing to construct a draining ditch that Ceritano needed before he could get approval to build." The Cherry Hill government agreed to build the drainage ditch and Ceritano then acquired two mortgages for a total of $1 million. However, soon after, a new Cherry Hill government decided to cancel their agreement, and thus Ceritano was only able to build a few houses, which led to him being unable to complete mortgage payments by 1975. The mortgages were subsequently foreclosed.

In 1975, Ceritano purchased the Cherry Hill restaurant Shepherd's Inn. Purchasing it for $100,000, he sold it six months later for $300,000, when he began working in the wine business.

=== Ceritano Wines and purchase of the Hilton Inn ===
Ceritano said that, in 1969, he saw "the rising wine demand" and began planning to import it. In 1970, he made an agreement with the Italian government for wine produced in his hometown Abruzzi to be given to him in 1975 to sell. He was given a loan to buy the wine; the Courier-Post stated that "He said they gave him $2 million; the government says it was $500,000. Thus was born the Ceritano wine company."

Starting in 1975, Ceritano began to produce advertisements for his Ceritano Wines business, with them frequently being featured on television and radio in the Philadelphia-area. The Inquirer stated that "the face and voice proved to be unforgettable," and led to what he called his "monstrosity of a recognition factor." The Courier-Post described how "Ceritano, with his bushy moustache, toothy grin and thick accent, projected an image of a 'little old Italian wine-maker' that charmed the Philadelphia public into buying his wines," and later called him "one of the all-time masters of self-promotion," noting that the commercials "earned him a cult following." In his commercials – which Ceritano claimed to have ad-libbed and spent less than $200 on to produce – he repeated his business's slogan: "Drink my wine, only if it gives you a moment of joy." During this time, a fan club for Ceritano was created by a group of high school girls in South Philadelphia, and Ceritano also was the host of a Saturday night television show that aired on WPHL-TV, called Moment of Joy. His advertisements were often featured at Philadelphia Phillies games, and in 1976, he purchased 31,000 tickets for their playoff games against the Cincinnati Reds and gave them away. By the end of 1976, "his wines had made him a fortune," according to the Courier-Post.

In December 1976, Ceritano assumed ownership of the Philadelphia Hilton Inn, which he had been negotiating for since the prior April. The Inn, which had already served as headquarters for his wine business, was operating at a significant loss and was set to be foreclosed when Ceritano expressed interest. He said that "[I wanted to buy it] because I could see it was not producing and I like to turn things around." The Inn's $6.8 million mortgage was transferred to him and his popularity from advertisements was cited as a reason he was allowed to take over the hotel. The Inquirer noted that all that Ceritano needed to give for the hotel was "a smile and a handshake" – along with the $20 filing fee, which he had borrowed from others.

=== Financial issues and bankruptcy ===
Ceritano's "financial empire" started to "unravel" in 1977 due to several financial issues. The prior year, he had acquired a loan from Fidelity Bank for $585,000 to pay for "futures" – "contracts guaranteeing future delivery of wine." After receiving several portions of the loan, he claimed that they required him to sign an agreement "that the bank could demand repayment in full at any time." He told The Inquirer:

But I'm still $50,000 short for what I want to do. They give me another $35,000, but they take back $18,000 right away for interest ... What kind of loan is that, you take it back before you give it to me? Anyway, now I have $585,000. Then ... Fidelity comes two weeks later and says unless I do what they want me to do, they're going to take the money. I tell him I have to sell the wine to get the money.

Ceritano claimed the loan was called in December 1976. In May 1977, a ruling by the New Jersey Superior Court ordered him to pay over $600,000 to the bank, and when unable to pay it, they were able to take possession of all of Ceritano's wine – 45,000 cases worth a total of $720,000.

Further, in July 1977, Westinghouse Credit, from which Ceritano had acquired the Hilton Inn, attempted to take it back, only a few months after he took possession of it. That month, the City of Philadelphia also sued him for $657,932 in unpaid taxes on the hotel, stating that he had not maintained an agreed monthly payment schedule, and that an agreed stock pledge as security for the taxes was also not given. At the same time, the workers at the Hilton Inn went on strike, declaring that Ceritano had not paid them benefits and was not honoring their contracts; a judge that month ruled Ceritano to "fire the nonunion workers whom he hired to replace the strikers and to rehire as many of the union employees as possible."

In Westinghouse's lawsuit, they alleged that Ceritano was "wasting" the Inn's assets, including by "taking operating funds for his own purposes; by spending hotel money for advertising that benefited other Ceritano businesses in addition to the hotel; by failing to pay the Hilton franchise fees, and by failing to collect rentals for the hotel space occupied by Ceritano Wines." The Inquirer noted that the case was unusual because "the traditional definition of 'wasting' an asset includes only physical damage to that asset." Ceritano argued that it was unfair for spending on advertisements to be considered "wasting" the hotel's assets, saying that "I was able to get that hotel with my personality and now they say I can't use my personality to sell a hotel room." He also stated that his spending had increased the revenue of the hotel, telling The Inquirer that "occupancy is up, food and beverage sales are up and losses this year will be down to perhaps $700,000 from last year's $1 million." He described those suing him in court as "wolves" that "are trying to steal away the success that he has made for himself."

On July 25, 1977, Ceritano filed for Chapter 12 bankruptcy, to reorganize the Inn's finances and an attempt to prevent Westinghouse from foreclosing the hotel; an attempt from Westinghouse to have it dismissed in a U.S. district court was denied. Two months later, on September 16, a ruling was made in his court case against the City of Philadelphia, with district court judge Barry M. Weinberg ordering Ceritano to turn over his 49 shares of Ceritano Wines, Inc., to the city. The same day, a federal bankruptcy judge appointed a trustee who gave operating control of the Inn to a Pittsburgh hotel firm. Later, on September 29, the judge ordered that Ceritano be barred from the hotel, after a lawyer for the trustee said that Ceritano had "disrupted" the hotel's operations.

In December 1977, a Superior Court judge signed a judgement that Ceritano was to pay the City of Philadelphia $486,314, to settle his tax bills. In 1978, his case against Fidelity Bank was closed with foreclosure. Some of his wine was later auctioned off in January 1979. A motion by Fidelity to auction his house at sheriff's sale was approved by a Superior Court judge in June 1979, and his attempt to block the sale of his house failed in September.

By 1981, Ceritano was described in the Courier-Post as "the former Italian shepherd boy who became a millionaire who became a pauper ... Today, he walks around with $5 in his wallet, a briefcase full of bankruptcy papers and an eviction notice from his Maple Shade apartment in his back pocket." He was employed selling condominiums for Ellis Construction Co. by 1982.

== Personal life and death ==
Ceritano met Frances Cini, the sister of singer Al Martino, while on a blind date in 1951, and the two married the following year. With her, Ceritano had three (Note: Reported in one source as four.) daughters. He spent his last years in New Jersey and died on May 2, 1990, in Woodbury, at the age of 58, due to heart failure. He was buried at the Holy Cross Cemetery in Yeadon, Pennsylvania.
