= AP Campionese =

Association football club in Italy

- Full name: Associazione Polisportiva Campionese
- Founded: 1978
- Ground: Centro Sportivo Scirèe; Campione d'Italia
- Capacity: 1.500
- President: Emanuele Gaiarin
- Manager: Antonio Krassimirov Mihaylov
- League: 5th Liga, Group 1
Home colours	Away colours

Associazione Polisportiva Campionese is a football club based in Campione d'Italia, Italy. The club plays in the Swiss football league system as Campione d'Italia is an Italian exclave surrounded by Switzerland.

== History ==
Campionese was founded in 1978.
