= Castel Castagna =

- Comune
- Comune di Castel Castagna
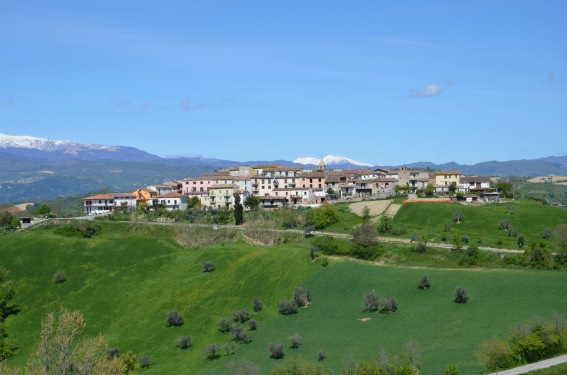

- Location within Italy Location within Abruzzo
- Coordinates: 42°33′N 13°43′E
- Country: Italy
- Region: Abruzzo
- Province: Teramo (TE)
- Frazioni: Bivio Castel Castagna, Castagna Vecchia, Chiavoni, Ronzano, Scaricasale, Vasto, Villa Ruzzi

Government
  - Mayor: Rosanna De Antoniis

Area
  - Total: 17 km^{2} (6.6 sq mi)
- Elevation: 452 m (1,483 ft)

Population (31 May 2017)
  - Total: 491
  - Density: 29/km^{2} (75/sq mi)
- Demonym: Castagnoli
- Time zone: UTC+1 (CET)
  - Summer (DST): UTC+2 (CEST)
- Postal code: 64030
- Dialing code: 0861
- Patron saint: San Pietro Martire
- Saint day: 29 June
- Website: Official website

Castel Castagna is a town and comune in the province of Teramo in the Abruzzo region of central-southern Italy. It is a small hilltop town with a view of the Gran Sasso massif.
