= Casinò di Campione =

Casino in Campione d'Italia, Italy

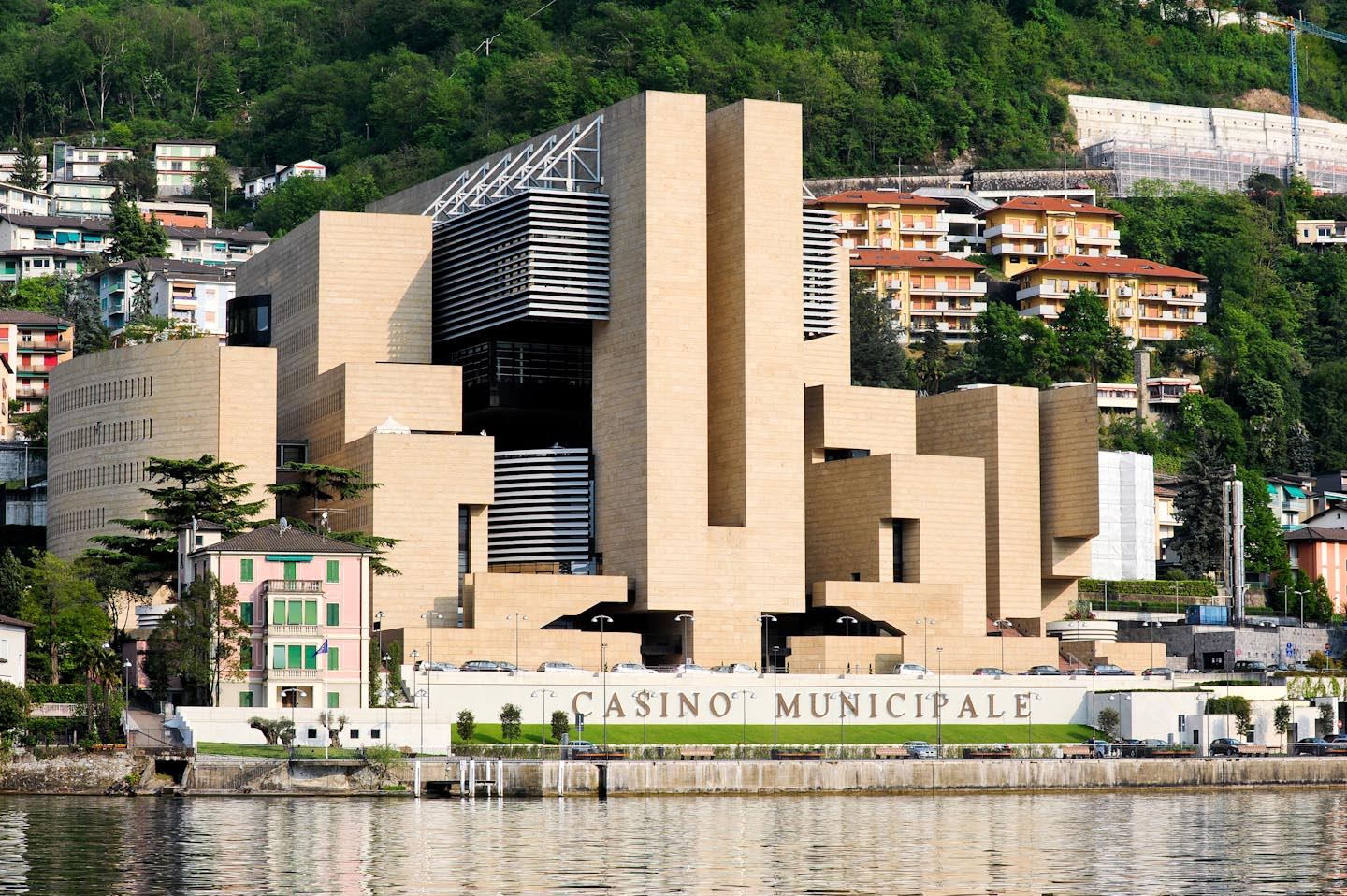
- The casino seen from the lake
- Interactive map of Casinò di Campione
- Location: Campione d'Italia, Italy; 45°58′14.97″N 8°58′17.89″E
- Opened: 1917
- Architect: Mario Botta
- Previous names: Municipal Casino of Campione
- Website: Official website

The Casinò di Campione is one of Italy's oldest casinos, as well as Europe’s largest casino and the largest employer in the municipality of Campione d'Italia, an Italian exclave within Switzerland's Canton of Ticino, on the shores of Lake Lugano.

Founded in 1917, the casino was declared bankrupt on 27 July 2018 and closed. On 26 January 2022, it was reopened after three years of inactivity.

== History ==
=== First building ===
The first Municipal Casino of Campione was founded in 1917, in the middle of World War I, as a site to gather information from foreign diplomats during the First World War. It was owned by the Italian government and operated by the municipality. The income from the casino was sufficient for the operation of Campione without taxation or other revenue. It remained open for two years, closing on 19 July 1919. It reopened on 2 March 1933.

=== New building ===
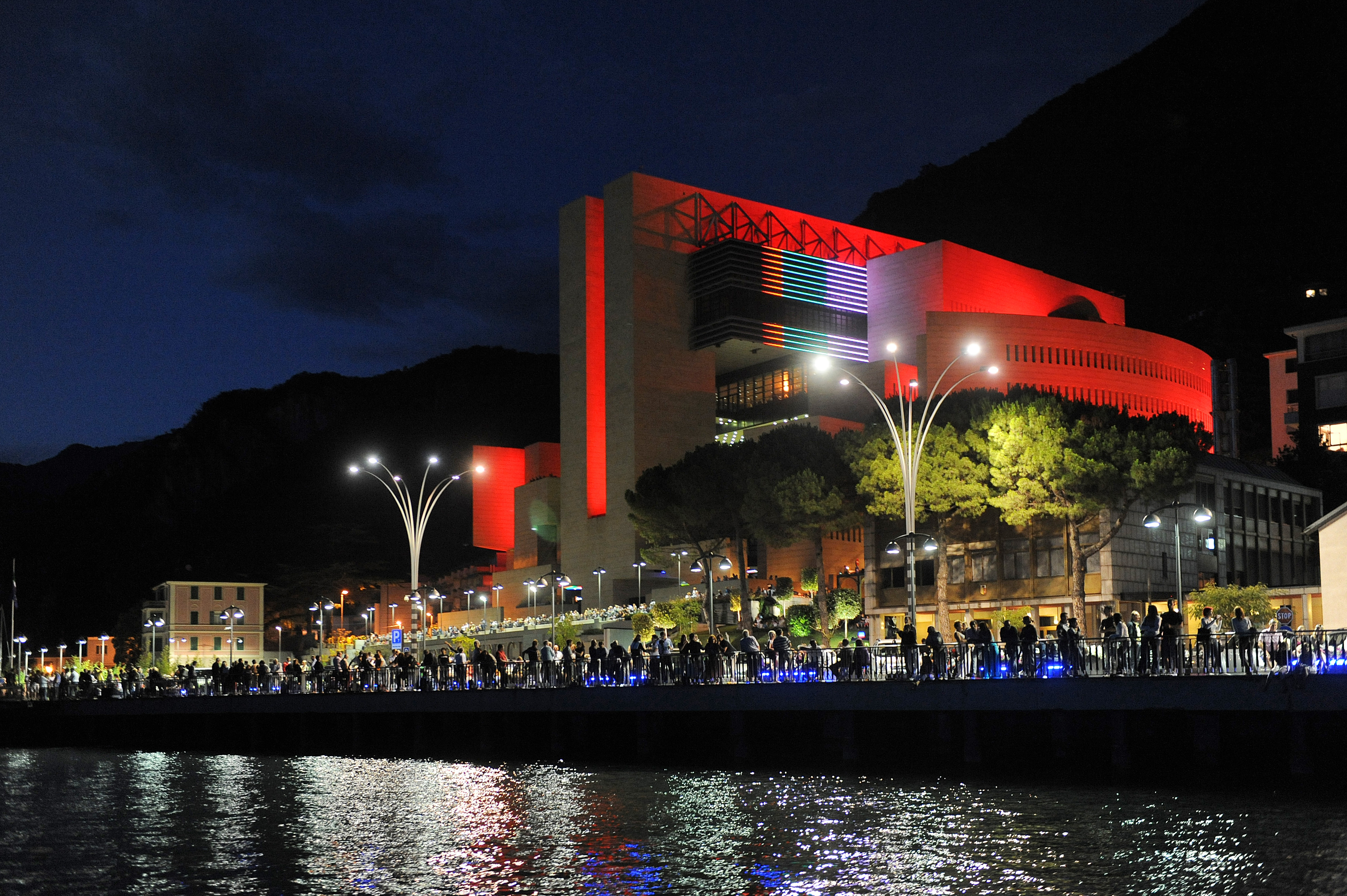
The casino at night

On 9 May 2007, the casino moved its operations into a new building alongside the old one, which dated from 1933 and has since been demolished. It was designed by Swiss architect Mario Botta for a general business cost of approximately 140 million Swiss francs and a total cost of approximately 193 million Swiss francs (equal to approximately 120 million euros at the date of completion). The new premises provided a floor space of more than 55,000 square metres (590,000 sq ft) on nine floors, with three further levels of underground parking, giving the casino space for 56 tables and 500 slot machines. The new casino was illuminated in red by night, and the building was clearly visible across the lake from the city waterfront of Lugano. It offered roulette, chemin de fer, baccarat, blackjack, poker, and slot machines. As soon as it was inaugurated, critics called the new building an "eco-monster" due to its imposing angular volume.

In 2013, the casino celebrated its 80th anniversary.

=== Bankruptcy and legal proceedings ===
On 27 July 2018, the Court of Como declared the casino bankrupt, and its management was entrusted to bankruptcy trustees. The bankruptcy request was presented by the Como prosecutor following the casino's inability to pay the fees due to the municipality of Campione, the sole shareholder, causing its financial distress. The prosecutor Pasquale Addesso asked for the bankruptcy of the gambling house following the millions in debt created by the town hall. As of 30 April 2018, debts amounted to €132 million, of which €22 million were due to the municipality.

Signs of a possible failure had already arisen at the beginning of the year, with the collective dismissal of 109 employees out of 492, a decision defined by the mayor of the enclave Roberto Salmoiraghi and by the sole administrator Marco Ambrosini as a "deed due in response to the bankruptcy petition requested by the Como Public Prosecutor's Office".

The bankruptcy of the casino was followed in 2018 by the declaration of financial distress of the municipality, the resignation of four councilors and the subsequent dissolution of the city council elected in 2017, the appointment of an extraordinary liquidation body and a prefectural commissioner and the further dismissal of 86 of the 102 employees of the municipality, with significant negative effects for the resident population. The decision was initially suspended by the Administrative Regional Court (TAR), and this decision was upheld in June 2019 by the Council of State in Rome.

Following the closure of the gambling house and the collective dismissal of 482 employees, the Campione d'Italia enclave saw a drastic decrease in tourists attracted by the casino, resulting in a rapid worsening of the economic and social conditions of the resident population in the Italian exclave. As a result of the bankruptcy, the kindergarten and a center for the elderly were closed, also leading to numerous warnings from public employees to the municipality regarding non-payment of salaries and lack of contributions to the functioning of fundamental services.

=== Reopening ===
The casino reopened on 26 January 2022.

== See also ==
- Casinò Lugano
