= Live! Casino & Hotel Philadelphia =

Resort in South Philly, Pennsylvania, U.S.

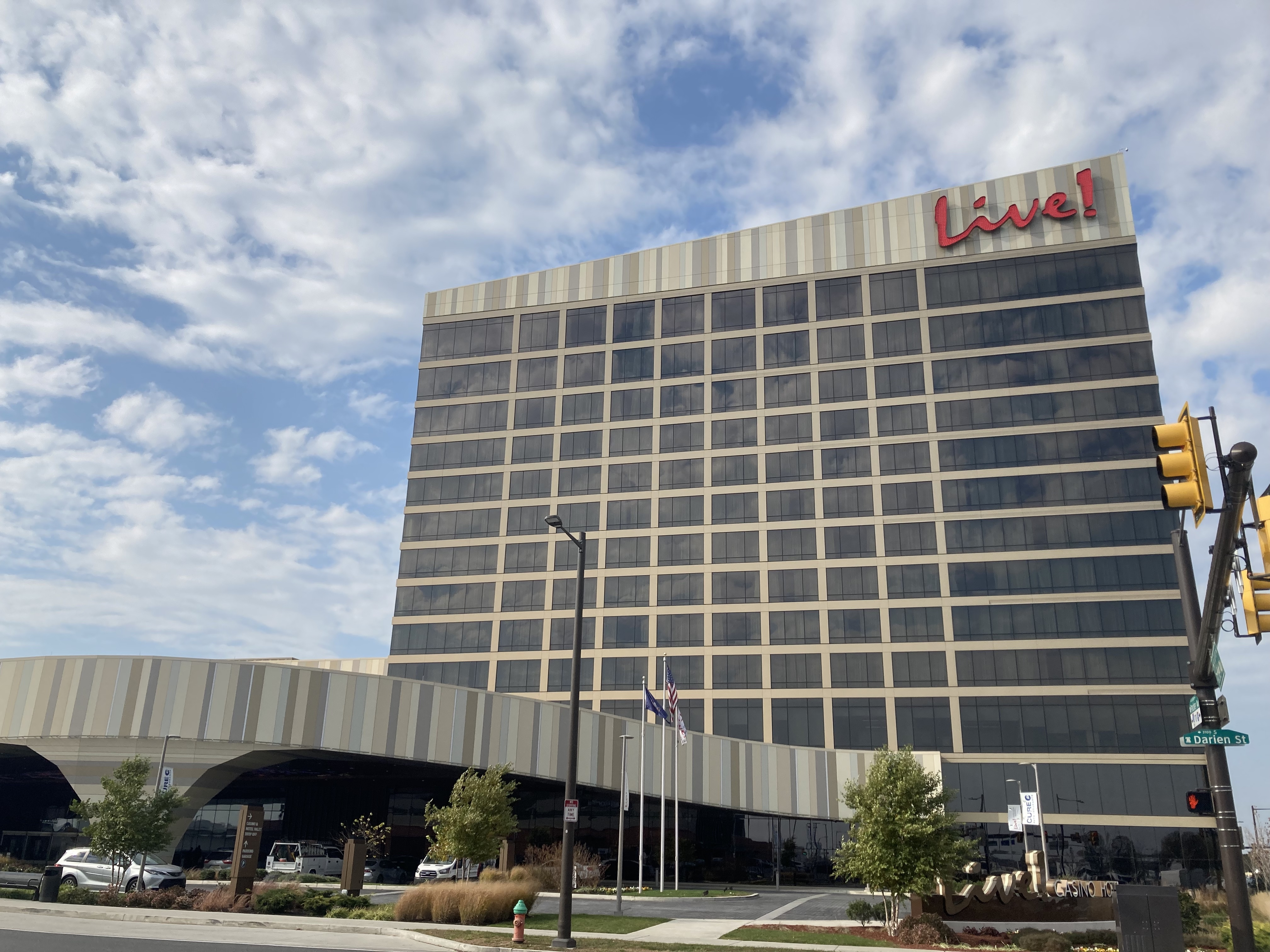

- Live! Casino & Hotel Philadelphia in Philadelphia and Pennsylvania Live! Casino & Hotel Philadelphia (Pennsylvania) Live! Casino & Hotel Philadelphia (the United States)
- Interactive map of Live! Casino & Hotel Philadelphia
- Location: 900 Packer Avenue Philadelphia, Pennsylvania 19148; 39.909406°N 75.164730°W
- Opened: January 19, 2021; 5 years ago (preview); February 4, 2021; 5 years ago (grand opening)
- No. of rooms: 208
- Owner: Gaming and Leisure Properties
- Operating license holder: The Cordish Companies
- Website: philadelphia.livecasinohotel.com

Live! Casino & Hotel Philadelphia is a casino hotel in Philadelphia, Pennsylvania that opened in 2021. The casino is in South Philadelphia near the South Philadelphia Sports Complex. It has 208 hotel rooms, 2,100 slot machines, 150 table games, and a sportsbook. It is owned by Gaming and Leisure Properties and operated by The Cordish Companies. Cordish also operates Stateside Live! nearby.

== History ==
The casino was planned to incorporate an existing Holiday Inn hotel in the South Philadelphia Sports Complex. The hotel was built by a group led by Bankers Securities Corp. at a cost of $7 million, and opened in 1974 as the Philadelphia Hilton Inn. In 1976, local wine distributor Armand Ceritano acquired a controlling stake in the hotel, which had operated at a steep loss and was facing foreclosure. Ceritano put the hotel into bankruptcy the following year and was forced out. In 1985, it was acquired by Connecticut-based Colonial Real Estate. Colonial collapsed in the early 1990s, causing the hotel to go into bankruptcy again and lose its franchise agreement with Hilton, after which it was renamed as the Philadelphia Court Hotel. In 1993, it was purchased by an investment group led by former Philadelphia Eagles quarterback Ron Jaworski, and became a Holiday Inn.

In 2004, Pennsylvania legalized casinos, authorizing up to 14 gaming licenses to be issued statewide, with two of them allocated to stand-alone casinos to be built in Philadelphia. The Pennsylvania Gaming Control Board awarded those two licenses to SugarHouse Casino and Foxwoods Casino Philadelphia, but Foxwoods failed to obtain financing for its construction, and its license was revoked in 2010. The license remained in limbo for two years as Foxwoods unsuccessfully appealed the decision, and legislators then debated putting the license up for statewide bid. In July 2012, the Board opened a new round of applications for the second Philadelphia casino license.

Cordish and Greenwood began evaluating sites shortly after the opening of the application process. In November 2012, they announced their proposal for a hotel-casino built around the Holiday Inn. It was one of six applications submitted to the Board. After two of the applicants withdrew, the Board selected the Cordish/Greenwood proposal as the best of the four remaining bids in November 2014.

The Board's decision was appealed by the other three applicants and by the competing SugarHouse Casino, who charged that the Board did not properly consider all the factors required by law. The project also faced opposition from African-American community groups because of allegations of racial discrimination at other Cordish properties; those concerns were largely defused after Cordish signed a community benefits agreement promising that much of the casino's hiring and contracting would go to minorities.

The project remained stalled in court for three years, because of claims that it would run afoul of a state law prohibiting any casino owner from owning more than a one-third interest in another casino within the state; Greenwood principal Bob Manoukian already owned a majority share of the Parx Casino, and he and his sons together would own a half interest in the Live! casino. The issue became moot in October 2017 when the state enacted a gaming expansion law that lifted the prohibition of multiple casino ownership. The lawsuit was promptly dropped, and Cordish stated that construction would begin in 2018, with completion planned for 2020. The planned opening date was delayed to early 2021 due to the COVID-19 pandemic.

Cordish and Greenwood closed on their purchase of the site in January 2018 for $37 million. Some demolition work at the site was performed later that year. In November 2018, Cordish announced that it would buy out Greenwood's interests, taking full ownership of the project. They also stated that the hotel tower would be demolished instead of renovated; as the project had evolved, they had decided that the tower's position at the center of the site would conflict with plans for an expansive casino floor.

On October 30, 2019, the Pennsylvania Gaming Control Board approved a sports betting license for the casino. Online sports betting is planned to be offered before the casino opens in 2021.

Live! Casino & Hotel Philadelphia opened on January 19, 2021 with a series of reservation-only preview days for reward members. The casino opened to the public on February 4, 2021, with a grand opening week celebration held.

In March 2022, Cordish sold the land and building to Gaming and Leisure Properties (GLP) in a leaseback transaction. GLP paid $674 million for Live Casino Philadelphia and its sister property Live Casino Pittsburgh, and leased them back to Cordish for $50 million per year.

== Features ==
The casino has over 2,100 slot machines and electronic table games, 150 table games, a 29-table poker room, and a sportsbook called FanDuel Sportsbook. The complex also has a 12-story hotel with 208 rooms, dining, entertainment, a 6-room event center with 15,000 square feet (1,400 m^{2}) of meeting space, a parking garage, and surface parking lots.
