= Campione d'Italia =

Exclave comune of Lombardy, Italy

Campione d'Italia Campiùn (Lombard)
- Comune
- Comune di Campione d'Italia
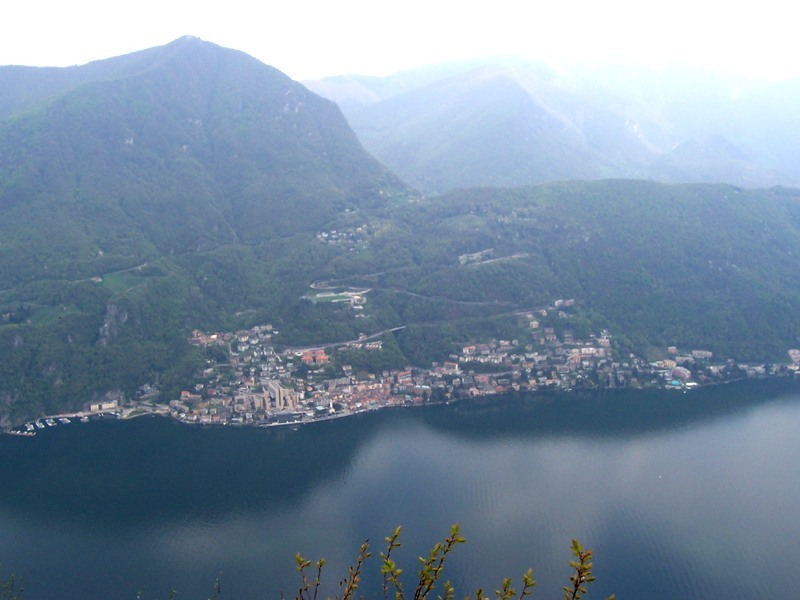
- Campione d'Italia in April 2006

- Flag Coat of arms

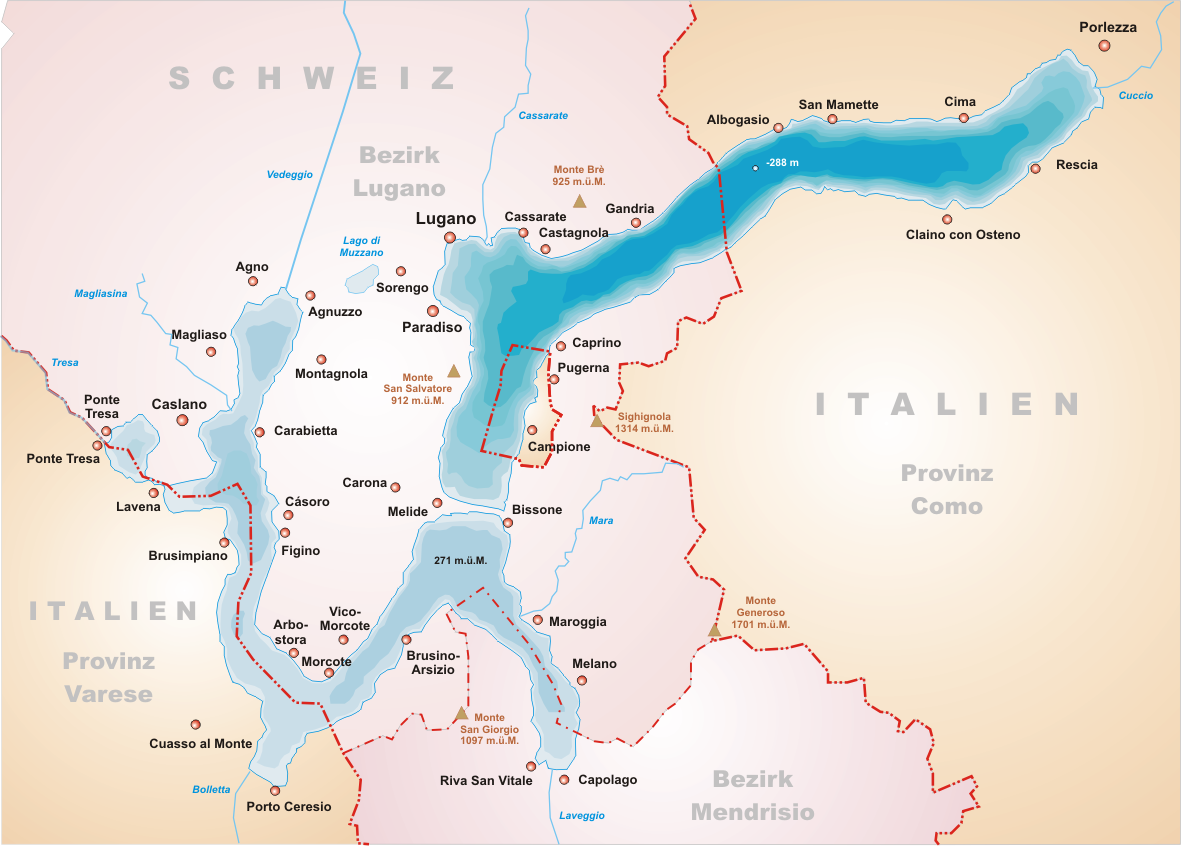

- Location within Italy Location within Lombardy
- Coordinates: 45°58′N 08°58′E
- Country: Italy
- Region: Lombardy
- Province: Como
- Founded: 77 BC

Government
  - Mayor: Roberto Canesi

Area
  - Total: 2.68 km^{2} (1.03 sq mi)
- Elevation: 273 m (896 ft)

Population (2026)
  - Total: 1,848
  - Density: 690/km^{2} (1,790/sq mi)
- Demonym: Campionesi
- Time zone: UTC+1 (CET)
  - Summer (DST): UTC+2 (CEST)
- Postal code: 22061
- Patron saint: St. Zeno
- Saint day: 12 April
- Website: Official website

Campione d'Italia (Italian: [kamˈpjoːne diˈtaːlja]; Comasco: Campiùn [kãˈpjũː]) is a town and comune (municipality) of the Province of Como in the region of Lombardy in Italy. Located on the shores of Lake Lugano, it is an enclave surrounded by the Swiss canton of Ticino. At its closest, the enclave is less than one kilometre (0.6 mi) from the rest of Italy, but the intervening mountainous terrain requires a journey by road through the Swiss village of Bissone of over 14 km (9 mi) to reach the nearest Italian town, Lanzo d'Intelvi, and over 28 km (17 mi) to reach the city of Como. It has 1,848 inhabitants.

== History ==
In the first century BC, the Romans founded the garrison town of Campilonum to protect their territories from Helvetii invasions.

In 777, Toto of Campione, a local Lombard lord, left his inheritance to the archbishopric of Milan. Ownership was transferred to the abbey of Sant’Ambrogio. In 1512, the surrounding area of Ticino was transferred from the ownership of the bishop of Como to Switzerland by Pope Julius II, as thanks for the support in the War of the Holy League. However, the abbey maintained control over what is now Campione d'Italia and some territory on the western bank of Lake Lugano.

When Ticino chose to become part of the Swiss Confederation in 1798, the people of Campione chose to remain part of the Cisalpine Republic. In 1800, Ticino proposed exchanging Indemini for Campione. In 1814 a referendum was held, and the residents of Campione opposed it. In 1848, during the First Italian War of Independence, Campione petitioned Switzerland for annexation, but was rejected due to the Swiss desire for neutrality.

After Italian unification in 1861, all land west of Lake Lugano and half of the lake were given to Switzerland so that Swiss trade and transport would not have to pass through Italy. The d'Italia was added to the name of Campione in the 1930s by the regime of Italian dictator Benito Mussolini, making the name translatable to "Champion of Italy", and an ornamental gate to the village was built. This was to assert the enclave's Italian character.

During World War II, the US Office of Strategic Services (OSS – the precursor to the CIA), partly through Berne OSS chief Allen Welsh Dulles, maintained a unit in Campione for operations in Italy. At the time the Italian fascist regime did not have control over the enclave. The Swiss ignored the situation as long as the Americans kept a low profile. Postage stamps were issued during this period inscribed "Campione d'Italia" and valued in Swiss currency.

== Administration ==
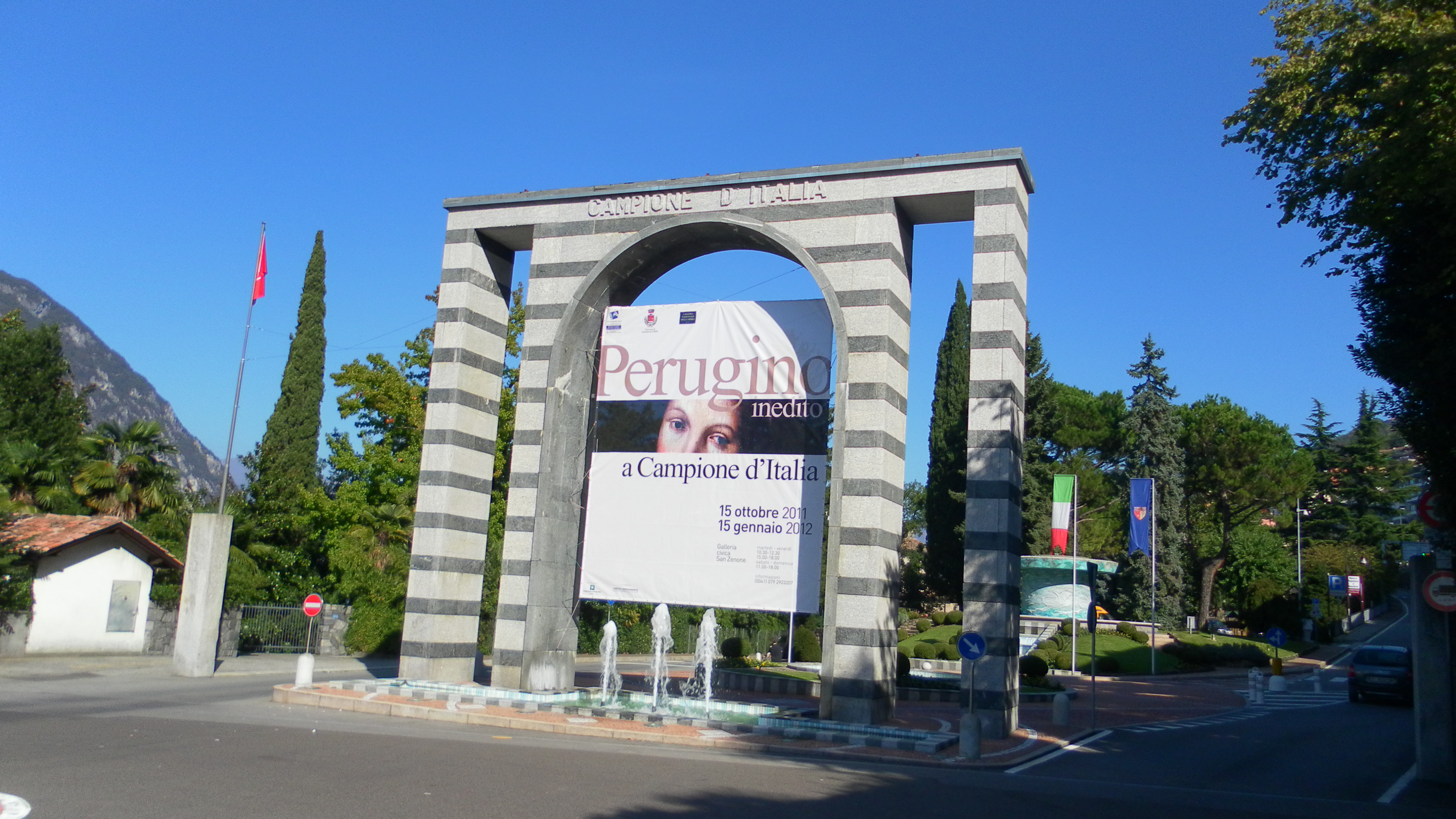
Piazza Indipendenza, border between Campione and Bissone, Switzerland

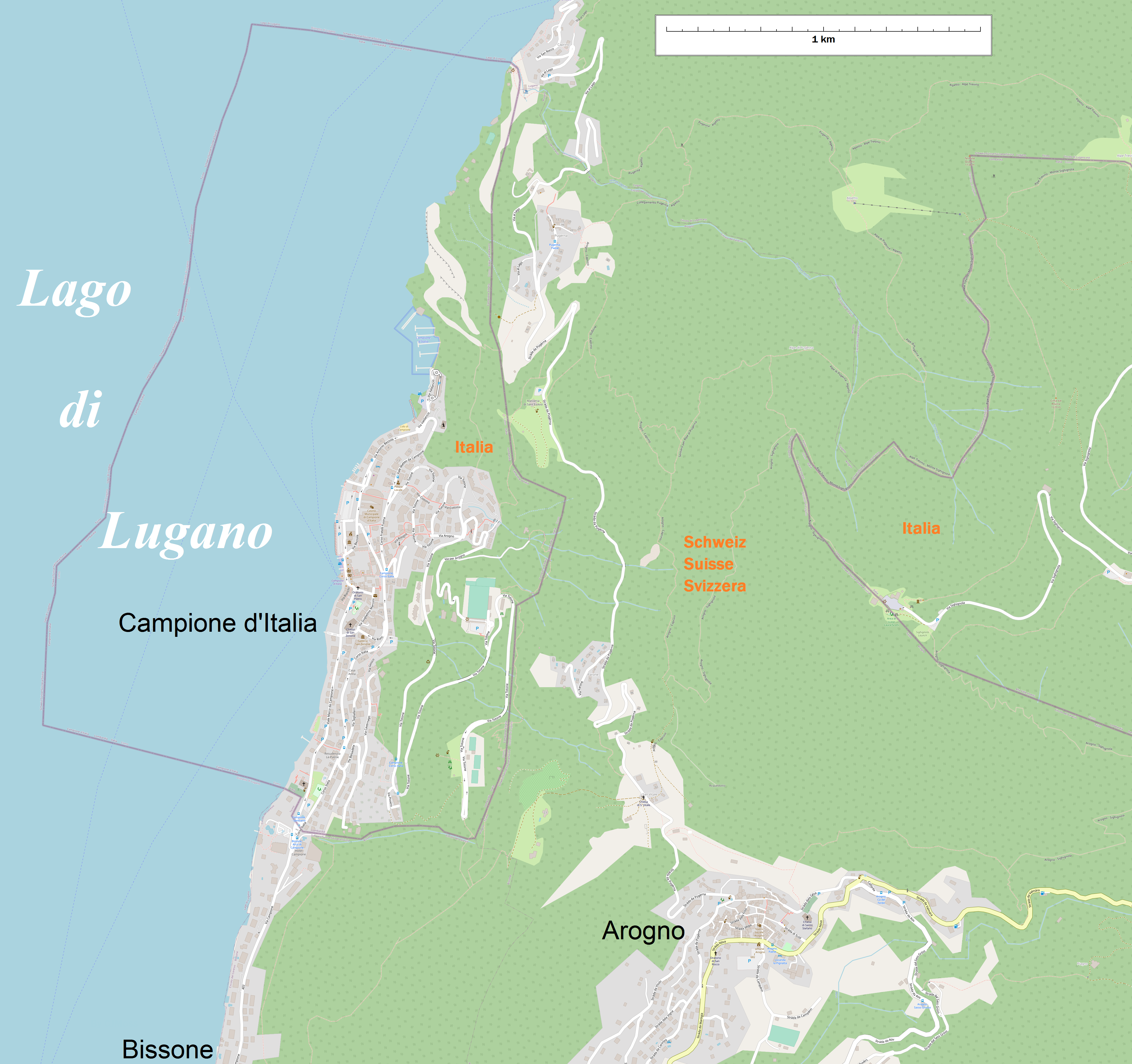
Detailed map of Campione d'Italia, neighbouring Swiss centres and the next nearest Italian territory

Campione has had a considerable amount of economic and administrative integration with Switzerland. However, on 1 January 2020, against the wishes of its residents, it formally became part of the EU customs territory. VAT now applies, but the tax rate remains that of Switzerland, which is much lower than that of Italy. A border crossing will be established.

Prior to 1 January 2020, it was de facto in the customs territory of Switzerland, meaning most of the public services were carried out by Swiss providers, such as refuse collection, telecommunications, and vehicle registration. The enclave enjoyed considerable tax breaks and was exempt from VAT. Campione d'Italia was one of four Italian cities issued a casino licence and took advantage of this by operating the Casinò di Campione, as gambling laws are less strict than in either Italy or Switzerland; also a legacy of the pre-World War II era. Although (as part of Italy) the euro is formally the only legal tender, in practice the main operating currency in the commune has been the Swiss franc, but euros are widely accepted. Salaries are paid in Swiss francs.

Pursuant to bilateral agreements, Italians residing in Campione also benefit from many services and facilities located in Swiss territory, such as hospital care, that would otherwise be available only to Swiss residents. People working in Campione but living in Switzerland have access to Swiss unemployment and other state help, which does not apply to those living within Campione village limits, which is legally Italy.

Firefighters and ambulances are provided by the Swiss authorities. However, security is provided by the Carabinieri (Italian military police) and the town also has a Polizia Locale group.

Previously, mail could be sent to Campione using either a Swiss postal code (CH-6911) or an Italian one (IT-22061) via Switzerland or Italy, but the Swiss postal code has ceased to be valid, with mail instead being charged at the same international rate as that between Switzerland and Italy. Consequently, all mail is now processed and delivered by Poste Italiane, not La Posta Svizzera. The telephone system remains Swiss, meaning that calls from Italy and all other countries outside Switzerland require the international dialling code for Switzerland, +41, with the exception of the town hall, which can be reached using the code for Italy, +39.

Similarly, motor vehicles, which used Ticino registration plates, were no longer allowed to do so, or to be insured in Switzerland. Instead, they were required to be registered in Como. However, electricity has always been supplied from Italy.

== Demographics ==
As of 2026, the population is 1,848, of which 50.1% are male, and 49.9% are female. Minors make up 12.6% of the population, and seniors make up 25.6%.

Historical population

Year	Pop.	±%
1799	200	—
1805	269	+34.5%
1809	156	−42.0%
1853	274	+75.6%
1861	311	+13.5%
1871	342	+10.0%
1881	383	+12.0%
1901	463	+20.9%
1911	552	+19.2%
1921	592	+7.2%

Year	Pop.	±%
1931	639	+7.9%
1936	855	+33.8%
1951	1,022	+19.5%
1961	1,435	+40.4%
1971	1,979	+37.9%
1981	2,183	+10.3%
1991	2,181	−0.1%
2001	2,267	+3.9%
2011	2,158	−4.8%
2021	1,748	−19.0%

Source:, ISTAT

=== Immigration ===
As of 2025, Campione d'Italia has the highest share of immigrants out of all Italian municipalities, as they make up 59.7% of the population. The 5 largest foreign countries of birth are Switzerland, Russia, Ukraine, Brazil, and Turkey.

== Casinò di Campione ==
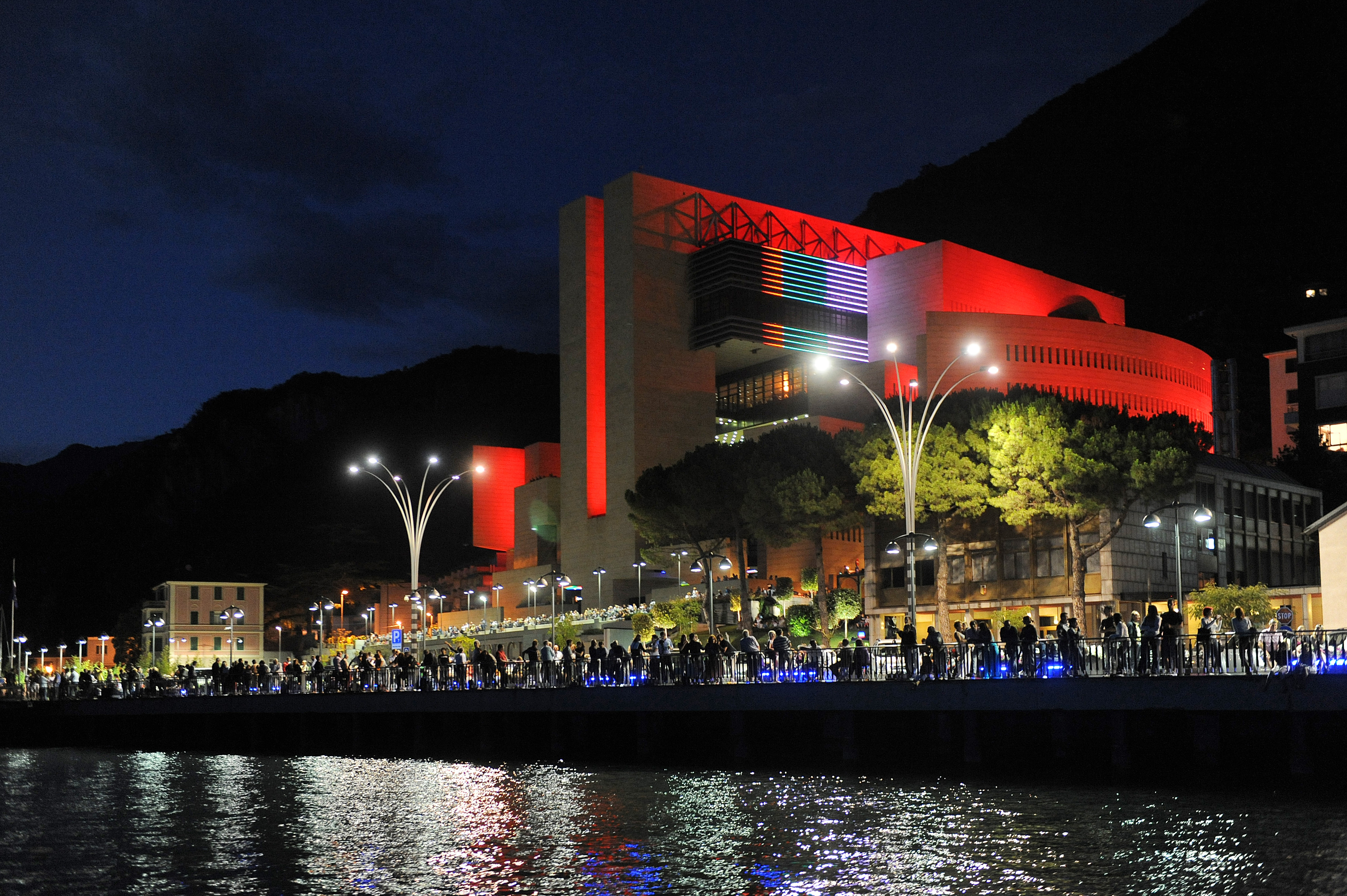
The Casinò di Campione, the oldest and largest casino in Europe

The Casinò di Campione is the largest employer in the municipality. The casino was founded in 1917. It is owned by the Italian government and operated by the municipality. As of 2012, the income from the casino was sufficient for the operation of Campione without the imposition of taxes, or obtaining of other revenue. It is Europe's largest casino.

The casino was declared bankrupt on 27 July 2018 and then closed. The economic impact of the closure was a threat to the entire village, with everything from pizzeria owners and taxi drivers to the municipal fire department on the list of creditors. Locals feared that without the casino, the commune would become a ghost town. Under the customs deal of 2020, Italy agreed to settle debts to Swiss creditors estimated at nearly €5 million. The casino re-opened on 26 January 2022.

== Education ==
Schools within the comune are the Scuola Materna G. Garibaldi, the Scuola Elementare, and the Scuola Media.

== Sports ==
AP Campionese is a football club based in Campione d'Italia. The club plays in the Swiss football league system.

== See also ==
- Büsingen am Hochrhein
- List of communes of the Province of Como
- List of enclaves and exclaves
- Llívia
