= Hilton Prague Atrium =

Hilton-branded hotel in Prague

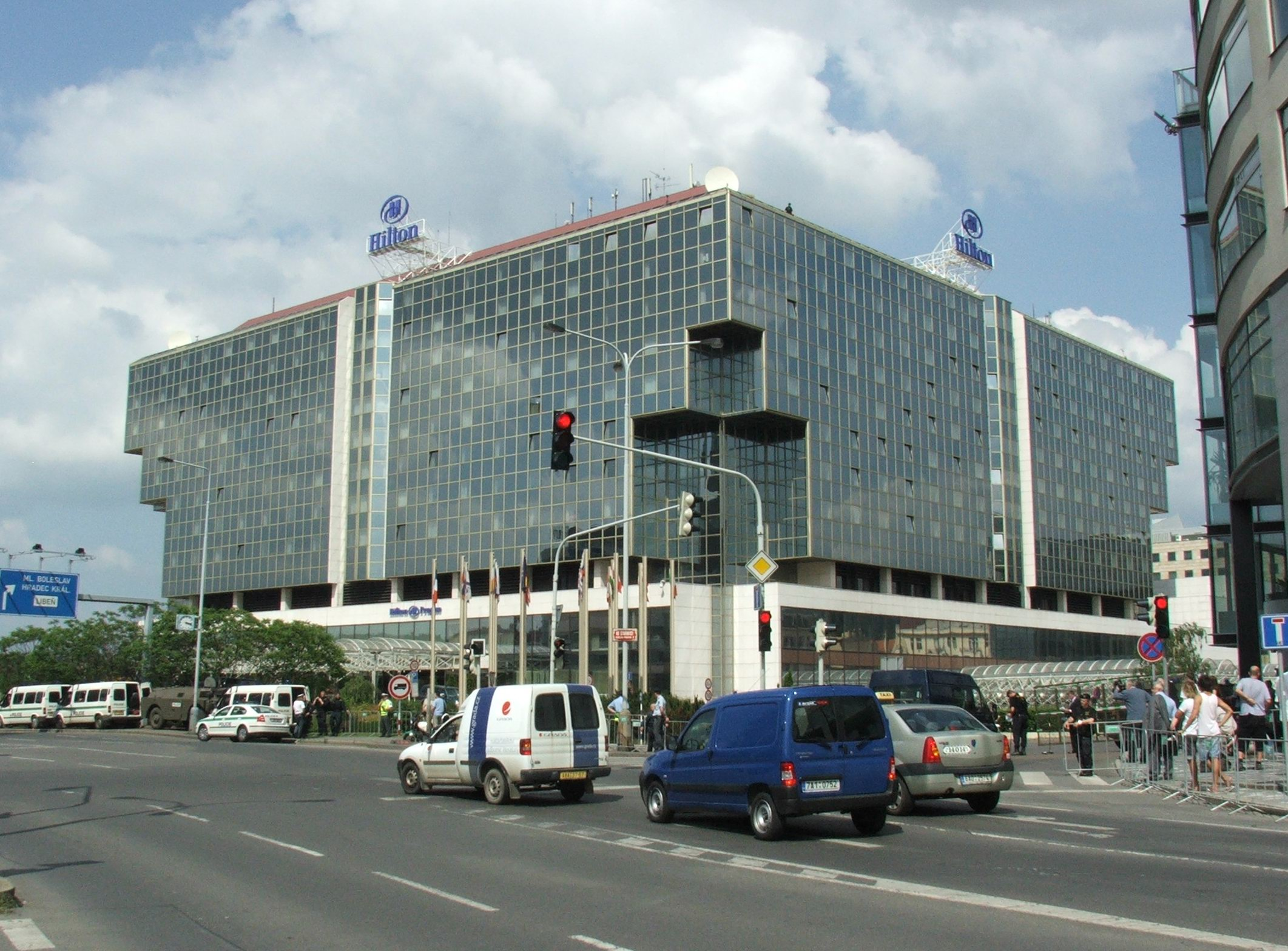
- Hilton Prague Atrium
- Interactive map of the Hilton Prague Atrium area

General information
- Type: Hotel
- Architectural style: Modern
- Location: Pobřežní 311/1, Praha 8, 186 00, Prague, Czech Republic
- Coordinates: 50.093266°N 14.439618°E
- Completed: 1991 (As Hilton 1995)
- Owner: Quinn Hotels Praha, a.s.

Technical details
- Floor count: 14

Other information
- Number of rooms: 791

Website
- official website

The Hilton Prague Atrium is a 791-room hotel in Prague, in the Czech Republic. It is located in the city center, near the Vltava River.

== History ==
The Hotel Atrium Praha opened on 1 June 1991. The 11-story hotel was designed by Czech architect Stanislav Franc. Hilton International assumed management of the hotel on 1 July 1995.

The hotel was awarded Best Hotel in the Czech Republic for 2012 and 2013 at the TTG Travel Awards.

The Hilton Prague Atrium is owned by Avid Asset Management. The hotel was put up for sale in November 2014.

The Hilton hotel brand has another property in Prague, the Hilton Prague Old Town.
