= Asian Poker Tour =

Poker tour held in the Asia Pacific region

- Current season, competition or edition: 2026
- Game: Texas hold 'em
- Founded: November 12, 2006; 19 years ago
- Founder: Capital Events Pte (2006–2008)
- Owner: APT Events Private Limited
- CEO: Fred Leung
- Director: Lloyd Fontillas
- President: Neil Johnson
- Country: Singapore (Founded)
- Region: Asia
- Streaming partners: asianpokertourlive theasianpokertour
- Sponsor: Natural8
- Website: http://www.apt.poker

The Asian Poker Tour (APT) was founded in 2006. To date, the APT has staged more than 110 major events and numerous smaller tournaments mainly in the Asia-Pacific Region. The tour has stopped at the Philippines, Macau, South Korea, Cambodia, Vietnam, India, China, Australia, London, New Caledonia and Mauritius. APT events combined have generated over US$50 Million in prize money all awarded to players.

== History ==
The Asian Poker Tour was founded in 2006 by Capital Events Pte – a company based in Singapore.

In 2008 APT was acquired by AsianLogic but Capital Events Pte will continue to run the tour, which recently added the Korean Professional Poker Tour and remains a shareholder. The agreement will see AsianLogic manage the running of the APT's online and land-based tournaments, as well as taking control of the APT's brand and URLs giving the company access to the APT database, which it hopes will help drive players to its poker sites.
In June 2022, APT Events Private Limited bought the Asian Poker Tour is set to expand its presence outside of Asia. APT veteran Lloyd Fontillas will, however, continue in his capacity as General Manager & Executive Tournament Director, with added responsibilities.

== Multiple Winners ==
Place	Player	1st	2nd	3rd	4th
1	(Japan) Iori Yogo	2016 ACR	2018 CH	2018 ME	2018 CH
2	(Norway) Henrik Tollefsen	2013 ME	2015 ME		
3	(England) Sam Razavi	2012 ME	2016 ME		
4	(Philippines) Mike Takayama	2014 ME	2017 ME		
5	(Malaysia) Sam Nee Aik Chuan	2017 ME	2017 ME		
6	(Philippines) Lester Edoc	2018 ME	2018 ME		
7	(Vietnam) Ha Duong	2012 ME	2020 CH		
8	(Philippines) Moses Saquing	2022 CH	2022 ME		
9	(Thailand) Punnat Punsri	2019 CH	2023 ME		
10	(China) Xixiang Luo	2019 CH	2024 ME		

ME = Main Event / CH = Championship / ACR = Accredited
Sorted by the year they entered the multiple titles list
Up to Season 2024 APT Phú Quốc (November 2024)

== Tournament Results ==
=== 2006 ===
Date/Venue	Event / City	Players	Prize Pool	Winner	Prize	Results
12–17 November; The Meritus Mandarin Hotel	betfair APT Singapore US$5,000	313	US$1,502,400	(Lithuania) Antanas "Tony G" Guoga	$451,700	

=== 2008 ===
Date/Venue	Event / City	Players	Prize Pool	Winner	Prize	Results
27 May-1 June; Dusit Thani Manila Hotel	(Philippines) APT Manila US$2,500	316	US$783,000	(Australia) David Saab	$280,000	
26–31 August; StarWorld Hotel & Casino	APT Macau US$5,300; US$1,500,000 Guaranteed	257	US$1,500,000	(Ukraine) Yevgeniy Timoshenko	US$500,000	

=== 2009 ===
Date/Venue	Event / City	Players	Prize Pool	Winner	Prize	Results
27 January-1 February; Dusit Thani Manila Hotel	(Philippines) APT Manila US$2,700	252	US$635,500	(Philippines) Neil Arce	US$185,000	
20–23 August; StarWorld Hotel & Casino	APT Macau HK$34,400 (US$4,438)	326	HK$10,919,040 (US$1,408,788)	(France) Adrien Allain	HK$3,035,000 (US$391,580)	

=== 2010 ===
In year 2010, the APT began its partnership with Resorts World Manila (RWM) which lasts until today. APT held some of its biggest events in RWM including the Guinness World Records Longest Continuous Poker Tournament, the APT-RWM Iron Man Poker Challenge, held in 2013.

Date/Venue	Event / City	Players	Prize Pool	Winner	Prize	Results
23–29 August; Resorts World Manila	(Philippines) APT Manila US$2,700	227	US$550,475	(Philippines) Michael Cua	US$176,700	
6–14 November; City of Dreams	APT Macau HK$35,000 (US$4,515)	161	HK$5,075,525 (US$654,779)	(China) Zhang Pan Peng	HK$1,678,000 (US$216,473)	
Accredited Events
8–10 January; Poker King Club; StarWorld Casino	APKT Macau HK$5,400 (US$697); HK$750,000 Guaranteed (US$96,750); Asian Poker King Tournament	174	HK$870,000 (US$112,230)	(South Korea) Il Wong Yoo	HK$284,200 (US$36,662)	P.27-29
7 March; Poker King Club; StarWorld Casino	MPC Macau HK$2,700 (US$348); HK$200,000 Guaranteed (US$25,760); Macau Poker Challenge	143	HK $357,500 (US$46,046)	(Hong Kong) Weng Hong Hoi	HK$116,800 (US$15,044)	
13–17 March; The Big Ace Liberty Club	(Philippines) TPC Mandaluyong ₱ 5,400 (US$118); The Poker Circuit: Plugged In	173	₱ 865,000 (US$18,883)	(Philippines) Mark Pagsuyuin	₱ 383,000 (US$8,361)	
16–19 March; Resorts World Manila Casino	(Philippines) RWM Manila ₱ 11,000 (US$242) ₱ 2,000,000 Guaranteed (US$43,661); RWM Inaugural Poker Championships	269	₱ 2,690,000 (US$58,724)	(South Korea) Sae Jin Lee	₱ 860,800 (US$18,792)	
22–26 April; StarWorld Casino	APKT Macau HK$8,000 (US$1,031); HK$1,000,000 Guaranteed; Asian Poker King Tournament	233	HK$1,730,025 (US$222,838)	(Hong Kong) Elton Tsang	HK$553,600 (US$71,307)	
14–16 May; Wild Aces Poker Club	(Philippines) TPC Pampanga ₱ 5,400 (US$115) ₱ 500,000 Guaranteed; The Poker Circuit: Wild n' Wet	131+35	₱ 830,000 (US$17,592)	(Philippines) Freddie Journeaux	₱ 148,700 (US$3,152)	

=== 2011 ===
The APT began the year with its new event format dubbed the APT Asian Series. This event features the same type of tournaments the APT is known for but at a much lower buy in.

Date/Venue	Event / City	Players	Prize Pool	Winner	Prize	Results
10–17 January; Waterfront Hotel Casino	(Philippines) APT Cebu ₱50,000 (US$1,125)	126	₱5,683,200 (US$127,893)	(Sweden) Andreas Lindblom	₱1,875,300 (US$42,201)	
28 March-3 April; Resorts World Manila	(Philippines) APT Manila US$2,700	231	US$560,175	(Philippines) Enrique Del Prado	US$179,260	
17–23 August; Resorts World Manila	(Philippines) APT Manila ₱50,000 (US$1,176)	396	₱17,681,580 (US$415,857)	(Philippines) Vic De Guzman	₱5,359,000 (US$126,040)	
8–14 November; Casino Royale Goa	(India) APT Goa ₹50,000 (US$1,006)	158	₹7,110,000 (US$143,048)	(India) Sangeeth Mohan	₹2,346,400 (US$47,208)	
Accredited Events
20–27 June; Waterfront Hotel Casino	(Philippines) All In ASOP Cebu ₱5,500 (US$126) ₱1,000,000 Guaranteed (US$22,894); All In Anniversary Series of Poker	199	₱1,000,000 (US$22,894)	(Philippines) Richard Tolentino	₱313,600 (US$7,180)	
1–6 December; Asia Poker Sports Club	(Philippines) Manny Pacquiao Manila ₱50,000 (US$1,157); Manny Pacquiao World Poker Event	148	₱6,675,540 (US$154,495)	(Australia) Oliver Speidel	₱2,202,000 (US$50,962)	

=== 2012 ===
The APT introduced the APT Player of the Year (APT POY) loyalty program in year 2012 wherein players' performance is measured throughout a year. The APT POY receives $8,000 worth of APT and APT Asian Series Main Event buy-ins at an event of his/her choice among other perks, while 2nd and 3rd-place winners receive 1 APT Main Event seat (value up to $2,700) and 1 APT Asian Series Main Event seat (value up to $1,100) respectively. English poker pro Sam Razavi won the first APT POY title and bagged the award for the next three consecutive years.

Date/Venue	Event / City	Players	Prize Pool	Winner	Prize	Results
28–29 January; Fox Poker Club	(England) APT London £545; Special Event (US$849)	125	£62,500 (US$97,319)	(England) William Dorey	£17,130 (US$26,673)	
4–7 February; Waterfront Hotel Casino	(Philippines) APT Series Cebu ₱50,000 (US$1,163)	251	₱11,321,400 (US$263,255)	(Singapore) Tan Tai Zheng	₱3,623,000 (US$84,245)	
18–22 March; MGM Sanya Resort	CPC Sanya Invitational ¥ 1,000,000 Prize Pool (US$157,940); China Poker Carnival 2012	414	¥ 1,000,000 (US$157,940)	(China) Chao Ma	¥ 300,000 (US$47,386)	
19–25 April; Resorts World Manila	(Philippines) APT Manila US$2,700	254	US$615,950	(South Africa) Divan Le Roux	US$197,000	
21–27 May; Casino Royale Goa	(India) APT Series Goa ₹50,000 (US$898)	131	₹5,895,000 (US$105,978)	(Sweden) Martin Nilsson	₹1,942,000 (US$34,912)	
25–31 July; StarWorld Hotel & Casino	APT Macau HK$25,000 (US$3,222)	268	HK$5,979,100 (US$770,735)	(Taiwan) Carlos Chang	HK$1,913,100 (US$246,607)	
19–26 August; Casino Ti Vegas, Grand Bay	APT Series Mauritius €900 (US$1,110)	114	€89,740 (US$110,660)	(Mauritius) Bruno Tadebois	€22,840 (US$28,165)	
19–25 September; Resorts World Manila	(Philippines) APT Series Manila ₱ 50,000 (US$1,195)	316	₱ 14,253,200 (US$340,682)	(Philippines) Jose Javier Medina	₱ 3,521,000 (US$84,159)	
14–20 November; Las Vegas Sun, Bavet City	APT Series Cambodia US$1,100	122	US$119,240	(Vietnam) Ha Duong	US$30,200	
3–9 December; Casino Royale Goa	(India) APT Goa ₹150,000 (US$2,750)	9	₹1,215,000 (US$22,279)	(England) Sam Razavi	₹790,000 (US$14,485)	

- Asian Poker Tour – Season 2012 – Leaderboard Champion: (England) Sam Razavi

=== 2013 ===
In year 2013, the APT in partnership with Resorts World Manila made an attempt to break the Guinness World Records Longest Continuous Poker Tournament which turned out to be a success. Shattering the previous record of 36 hours, 34 minutes and 41 seconds set in Delaware, USA. in August 2012, the APT-RWM Iron Man Poker Challenge set a new world record of 48 hours, 55 minutes and 58.5 seconds in December 2013.

Date/Venue	Event / City	Players	Prize Pool	Winner	Prize	Results
23–30 January; Waterfront Hotel Casino	(Philippines) APT Series Cebu ₱50,000 (US$1,227)	113	₱5,096,900 (US$125,096)	(South Korea) Seung-Soo Jeon	₱1,302,000 (US$31,956)	
27 February-6 March; Royal Palace Casino, Oriental Hotel	(Philippines) APT Series Jeju US$1,100	166	US$160,520	(South Korea) Ryan Yu	US$36,100	
17–24 April; Resorts World Manila	(Philippines) APT Manila US$2,700	205	US$497,120	(Australia) Khac-Trung Tran	US$124,000	
24–31 July; StarWorld Hotel & Casino	APT Macau HK$25,000 (US$3,222)	193	HK$4,439,000 (US$572,176)	(Norway) Henrik Tollefsen	HK$981,700 (US$126,538)	
18–23 August; Ramada Hotel Jeju	(Philippines) APT Jeju US$2,700	45	US$113,970	(China) Lifeng Shen	US$35,300	
9–16 October; Resorts World Manila	(Philippines) APT Series Manila ₱ 50,000 (US$1,158)	389	₱ 17,357,000 (US$402,129)	(Philippines) Czardy Rivera	₱ 4,270,000 (US$98,927)	
5–8 December; The Star, Sydney (Australia)	(Australia) APT Sydney A$2,000; Special Event (US$1,820)	649	A$1,166,400 (US$1,060,537)	(Australia) Tristan Bain	A$281,685 (US$256,119)	
11–15 December Resorts World Manila	(Philippines) APT Manila US$700 Iron Man Poker Challenge Guinness World Record	115	US$71,400	(United States) Damon Shulenberger	US$18,240	

- Asian Poker Tour – Season 2013 – Leaderboard Champion: (England) Sam Razavi, Back-to-back: Two times APT Leaderboard in a row.

=== 2014 ===
2014 was a season when the tour went "quality over quantity". APT Tournament Director Lloyd Fontillas called 2014 a building year for staging fewer events, with much more quality in getting great player numbers.

Date/Venue	Event / City	Players	Prize Pool	Winner	Prize	Results
12–19 February; Waterfront Hotel Casino	(Philippines) APT Series Cebu ₱50,000 (US$1,110)	299	₱13,341,000 (US$296,275)	(New Zealand) Paul Hockin	₱3,235,000 (US$71,842)	
30 April-7 May; Resorts World Manila	(Philippines) APT Manila US$2,700	208	US$504,400	(Singapore) Feng Zhao	US$126,500	
27 February-6 March; Queenco Casino, Sihanoukville	APT Series Cambodia US$1,100	112	US$108,600	(Denmark) Michael Lindstrom	US$27,700	
10–17 September; Resorts World Manila	(Philippines) APT Series Manila ₱ 50,000 (US$1,145)	356	₱ 17,033,000 (US$389,893)	(Philippines) Mike Takayama	₱ 3,453,000 (US$79,041)	
3–10 December; Resorts World Manila	(Philippines) APT-RWM Manila Finale ₱ 50,000 (US$1,120)	289	₱ 12,895,200 (US$288,757)	(Vietnam) Quang Huy Pham	₱ 3,185,000 (US$71,320)	
1–18 December; King's Casino Rozvadov	(Czech Republic) Prague Poker Festival €1,100 (US$1,362)	33	€32,010 (US$39,831)	(Poland) Pawel Zawadowicz	€10,440 (US$12,991)	

- Asian Poker Tour – Season 2014 – Leaderboard Champion: (England) Sam Razavi, Back-to-back-to-back: Three times APT Leaderboard in a row (2012–2013–2014).

=== 2015 ===
In 2015, the APT increased the APT POY prize from $8,000 to $10,000 worth of APT and APT Asian Series Main Event buy-ins. Sam Razavi earned the APT POY title for the fourth consecutive year bestowing him the title APT Quadruple Player of the Year.

The APT also opened its own poker room in Manila in February 2015 where two of the tour's events were held on that year, including the year-ender event.

Date/Venue	Event / City	Players	Prize Pool	Winner	Prize	Results
27 January-4 February; Waterfront Hotel Casino	(Philippines) APT Series Cebu ₱50,000 (US$1,132)	207	₱9,186,300 (US$208,063)	(Philippines) John Tech	₱2,307,300 (US$52,258)	
27 February-2 March; Resorts World Manila	(Philippines) APT Poker Room Manila ₱1,500 (US$34) Inaugural Event	326	₱423,800 (US$9,615)	(Canada) Randy Boone	₱104,500 (US$2,371)	
14–22 April; Resorts World Manila	(Philippines) APT Manila US$2,200	211	US$409,300	(Germany) Julius Malzanini	US$79,200	
27 February-6 March; The Grand Ho Tram	APT Vietnam US$1,100	119	US$115,400	(Hong Kong) Kwan Kit Kwok	US$26,800	
5–9 June; Manila Pavilion Hotel & Casino	(Philippines) APT Weekend Series Manila ₱ 27,500 (US$610)	147	₱ 3,565,000 (US$79,052)	(Japan) Gerard Bringley	₱ 714,000 (US$15,833)	
11–19 August; Waterfront Hotel Casino	(Philippines) APT Series Cebu ₱50,000 (US$1,080)	160	₱7,139,000 (US$154,262)	(Norway) Henrik Tollefsen	₱1,717,000 (US$37,102)	
29 September-7 October; Resorts World Manila	(Philippines) APT Series Manila ₱ 50,000 (US$1,068)	341	₱ 14,711,800 (US$314,232)	(Singapore) Yah Loon Lim	₱ 3,000,000 (US$64,077)	
20–28 October; Queenco Casino Sihanoukville	APT Series Cambodia US$1,100	99	US$96,030	(Vietnam) Linh Tran	US$26,130	
9–17 December; Casino Filipino Pavilion	(Philippines) APT Manila Finale ₱ 50,000 (US$1,054)	169	₱ 7,541,000 (US$158,976)	(Philippines) Joven Huerto	₱ 1,927,000 (US$40,624)	

- Asian Poker Tour – Season 2015 – Leaderboard Champion: (England) Sam Razavi, Back-to-back 4 times: For the forth times APT Leaderboard in a row (2012-2013-2014-2015).

=== 2016 ===
2016 is APT's busiest year to date with 14 APT events and 1 APT-accredited event staged in a year. In the beginning of the year, APT started offering the APT Main Event Bubble Protection which insured the players availing it by giving back the Main Event buy-in in the form of APT tournament credits when the insured player busts out on the bubble. To avail of the bubble protection, players must pre-register for the Main Event, draw for a seat before starting time, and have his/her chips put into play on the first deal of level.

Changes in the winnings distribution of the APT Player of the Year ('APT POY') has also been made. The second and third place awards have been eliminated and $2,000 worth of APT prizes were awarded to each APT POY leader from the Philippines, Japan, South Korea, China, and one for the top nationality outside of those countries mentioned. The overall APT POY 2016 still received $10,000 worth of APT prizes. A total of $20,000 worth of APT prizes has been awarded for the APT POY 2016 race.

This was also the year when (England) Sam Razavi was dethroned by (Japan) Iori Yogo after four years of APT POY reign.

Date/Venue	Event / City	Players	Prize Pool	Winner	Prize	Results
13–21 January; Manila Pavilion Hotel & Casino	(Philippines) APT Series Manila Kickoff ₱50,000 (US$1,044)	134	₱ 6,499,000 (US$135,660)	(Thailand) Thong Botho	₱ 1,660,000 (US$34,651)	
10–18 February; Waterfront Hotel Casino	(Philippines) APT Cebu ₱55,000 (US$1,155)	144	₱6,984,000 (US$146,764)	(England) Alex Ward	₱1,783,000 (US$37,469)	
23–31 March; Daegu Casino Poker Room	(South Korea) APT Daegu ₩1,650,000 (US$1,410)	64	₩93,120,000 (US$79,552)	(Japan) Kim Nayoung	₩25,800,000 (US$22,041)	
13–21 April; Resorts World Manila	APT Philippines I US$3,300	180	US$523,800	(South Korea) Jeon Seung Soo	US$116,100	
15–22 May; Manila Pavilion Hotel & Casino	(Philippines) APT Experience Manila ₱55,000 (US$1,181)	127	₱ 6,159,000 (US$132,236)	(South Korea) Gyeong Byeong Lee	₱ 1,574,000 (US$33,794)	
15–23 June; Queenco Casino Sihanoukville	APT Cambodia US$1,100	48	US$46,560	(Japan) Hisashi Ogi	US$16,530	
19–27 July; Resorts World Manila	APT Philippines II US$2,200	114	US$221,200	(Japan) Shinichiro Tone	US$56,600	
9–15 August; Manila Pavilion Hotel & Casino	(Philippines) APT Weekend Series Manila ₱27,500 (US$588)	216	₱ 5,238,000 (US$111,979)	(South Korea) John Kim	₱ 1,132,000 (US$24,200)	
14–22 September; Resorts World Manila	APT Philippines III US$1,650	186	US$270,630	(South Korea) In Chul Sin	US$67,660	
29 September-2 October; Rex Fortune Cruise; South China Sea	(Hong Kong) APT Poker Cruise HK$11,000 (US$1,418)	15	HK$145,500 (US$18,763)	(England) Sam Razavi	HK$72,700 (US$9,375)	
4–12 October; Manila Pavilion Hotel & Casino	(Philippines) APT Manila ₱55,000 (US$1,138)	57	₱ 2,764,000 (US$57,191)	(Philippines) Alexis Lim	₱ 766,000 (US$15,849)	
19–25 October; Lisboa Hotel & Casino	APT Macau HK$22,000 (US$2,835)	108	HK$1,611,000 (US$207,651)	(China) Guo Dong	HK$530,000 (US$68,315)	
16–24 November; Nouméa Grand Casino; New Caledonia	(New Caledonia) APT Nouméa XPF110,000 (US$976)	143	XPF13,316,200 (US$118,157)	(New Caledonia) Daniel Gilles	XPF3,402,300 (US$30,189)	
7–15 December; Lisboa Hotel & Casino	APT Macau Finale HK$22,000 (US$2,835)	273	HK$2,620,800 (US$337,805)	(South Korea) Soojo Kim	HK$647,300 (US$83,433)	
Accredited Events
5–8 February; Western World Bar Japan	(Macau) Okinawa Poker Cup ¥0,00	273	¥0,00	(Japan) Iori Yogo	¥0,00	
OKINAWA Poker Cup: PRIZE POOL: 1st APT Main Event and High Rollers Package; 2nd APT Main Event and Side Event Package; 3rd APT Main Event Package; 4th 6 APT Side Events Package; 5th 5 APT Side Events Package; 6th 4 APT Side Events Package; 7th 3 APT Side Events Package; 8th 2 APT Side Events Package; 9th 1 APT Side Event Package; 10th to 12th 3 Side Events each 13th to 15th 2 Side Events each 16th to 18th 1 Side Event each

- Asian Poker Tour – Season 2016 – Leaderboard Champion: (Japan) IORI YOGO

=== 2017 ===
The APT Player of the Series (APT POS) has been introduced by the APT in its tournaments in 2017. It is a cumulative measure of player's performance throughout a full series. The APT POS awarded the 1st, 2nd and 3rd-place winners.

The last APT POY, Japan's Tetsuya Tsuchikawa, has been awarded as the season came to an end. The APT POY has been eliminated the following year to give way to more prizes for the APT Player of the Series.

Date/Venue	Event / City	Players	Prize Pool	Winner	Prize	Results
11–19 January; Resorts World Manila	(Philippines) APT Series Manila Kickoff US$1,650	96	US$139,680	(Japan) Takumi Samejima	US$38,020	
11–19 January; Resorts World Manila	(Philippines) APT Series Manila Kickoff US$1,650	Player of the Series APT Manila Kickoff: (Japan) Yoichi Uesugi				
22–30 March; Paradise Grand Casino	(South Korea) APT Series Korea Jeju ₩1,650,000 (US$1,471)	56	₩81,480,000 (US$72,648)	(Japan) Katsuhiro Muto	₩22,570,000 (US$20,123)	
22–30 March; Paradise Grand Casino	(South Korea) APT Series Korea Jeju ₩1,650,000 (US$1,471)	Player of the Series APT Korea – Jeju: (Japan) Horikawa Daiki				
26 April-7 May; Resorts World Manila	(Philippines) APT Championships Philippines; MAIN EVENT US$1,100	442	US$428,740	(Philippines) Mike Takayama	US$105,530	
26 April-7 May; Resorts World Manila	(Philippines) APT Championships Philippines; CHAMPIONSHIPS EVENT US$2,200	189	US$366,660	(Vietnam) Huu Dung Nguyen	US$91,670	
26 April-7 May; Resorts World Manila	(Philippines) APT Championships Philippines; CHAMPIONSHIPS EVENT US$2,200	Player of the Series APT Championships Philippines: (South Korea) Kim Gab Yong				
14–22 June; Babylon Casino	APT Macau HK$19,800 (US$2,532)	118	HK$2,039,000 (US$261,383)	(Malaysia) Choong Kian Weng	HK$521,000 (US$66,788)	
14–22 June; Babylon Casino	APT Macau HK$19,800 (US$2,532)	Player of the Series APT Macau: (Japan) Tetsuya Tsuchikawa				
1–7 July; Star Vegas Casino Poipet, Cambodia	(Cambodia) APT Southeast Asia US$1,100	50	US$48,500	(Malaysia) Sam Nee Aik Chuan	US$14,790	
1–7 July; Star Vegas Casino Poipet, Cambodia	(Cambodia) APT Southeast Asia US$1,100	Player of the Series APT Southeast Asia: (Japan) Tetsuya Tsuchikawa				
19–27 July; Manila Pavilion Hotel & Casino	APT Philippines I ₱110,000 (US$2,166)	24	₱2,328,000 (US$45,845)	(Malaysia) Sam Nee Aik Chuan	₱ 1,001,000 (US$19,712)	
19–27 July; Manila Pavilion Hotel & Casino	APT Philippines I ₱110,000 (US$2,166)	Player of the Series APT Philippines I: (Singapore) Dhanesh Chainani				
12–20 August; Paradise Hotel & Resort	(South Korea) APT Series Korea Incheon ₩1,100,000 (US$965)	185	₩179,450,000 (US$157,392)	(United States) Albert Paik	₩44,860,000 (US$39,345)	
12–20 August; Paradise Hotel & Resort	(South Korea) APT Series Korea Incheon ₩1,100,000 (US$965)	Player of the Series APT Korea – Incheon: (Japan) Iori Yogo				
13–21 September; Resorts World Manila	APT Philippines II US$1,650	132	US$192,060	(South Korea) Sung Ho Kim	US$40,250	
13–21 September; Resorts World Manila	APT Philippines II US$1,650	Player of the Series APT Philippines II: (Singapore) Dhanesh Chainani				
20–29 October; Nouméa Grand Casino; New Caledonia	(New Caledonia) APT Nouméa XPF110,000 (US$1,025)	85	XPF7,915,200 (US$73,733)	(New Caledonia) Andre Moracchini	XPF2,154,500 (US$20,069)	
20–29 October; Nouméa Grand Casino; New Caledonia	(New Caledonia) APT Nouméa XPF110,000 (US$1,025)	Player of the Series APT Nouméa: (New Caledonia) Andre Moracchini				
6–14 November; Winford Hotel & Casino	(Philippines) APT Manila ₱38,500 (US$750)	82	₱2,783,900 (US$54,206)	(United Kingdom) Neil Raine	₱757,800 (US$14,755)	
6–14 November; Winford Hotel & Casino	(Philippines) APT Manila ₱38,500 (US$750)	Player of the Series APT Manila: (Australia) Anthony Abram				
29 November-10 December; Macau Billionaire Poker; Babylon Casino	APT Championships Macau FINALE; MAIN EVENT HK$11,000 (US$1,408)	157	HK$1,807,600 (US$231,400)	(India) Varun Gupta	HK$300,400 (US$38,456)	
29 November-10 December; Macau Billionaire Poker; Babylon Casino	APT Championships Macau FINALE; CHAMPIONSHIPS EVENT HK$22,000 (US$2,816)	87	HK$1,687,800 (US$215,950)	(Singapore) Alecz Chan Xianhe	HK$369,950 (US$47,334)	
29 November-10 December; Macau Billionaire Poker; Babylon Casino	APT Championships Macau FINALE; CHAMPIONSHIPS EVENT HK$22,000 (US$2,816)	Player of the Series APT Championships Macau Finale: (Taiwan) Hung Sheng Lin				

- Asian Poker Tour – Season 2017 – Player of the Year: (Japan) TETSUYA TSUCHIKAWA; The Japanese professional poker player entered the live tournament scene in 2010 and since then has earned numerous achievements in practically all of the big events in Asia.

=== 2018 ===
Starting year 2018, the APT POY has been eliminated, and cash prizes have been added to the APT POS – Player of the Series. On top of the prizes received by the APT POS, the winner is also awarded with $800 in cash, while the 2nd and 3rd-place winners received $100 in cash each as additional prizes.

Date/Venue	Event / City	Players	Prize Pool	Winner	Prize	Results
19–28 January; Pro Poker Club; Ho Chi Minh	APT Series Vietnam Kickoff ₫ 16,500,000 (US$723)	664	₫9,661,200,000 (US$423,050)	(Germany) Adrian Esslen	₫1,000,000,000 (US$57,718)	
19–28 January; Pro Poker Club; Ho Chi Minh	APT Series Vietnam Kickoff ₫ 16,500,000 (US$723)	Player of the Series APT Vietnam Kickoff: (Germany) Adrian Esslen				
21 March-2 April; Resorts World Manila	APT Championships Philippines I MAIN EVENT ₱55,000 (US$1,049); Guaranteed ₱8,000,000 (US$152,536)	325	₱15,762,500 (US$300,545)	(Philippines) Lester Edoc	₱2,328,000 (US$45,845)	
21 March-2 April; Resorts World Manila	APT Championships Philippines I CHAMPIONSHIPS EVENT ₱110,000 (US$2,099)	100	₱9,700,000 (US$185,130)	(Japan) Iori Yogo	₱2,402,500 (US$45,853)	
21 March-2 April; Resorts World Manila	APT Championships Philippines I CHAMPIONSHIPS EVENT ₱110,000 (US$2,099)	Player of the Series APT Championships Philippines I: Lester Edoc				
25 April-6 May; Billionaire Poker; Babylon Casino	(Macau) APT Championships Macau; MAIN EVENT HK$11,000 (US$1,401)	377	HK$3,619,200 (US$461,148)	(Taiwan) Hung Sheng Lin	HK$587,000 (US$74,794)	
25 April-6 May; Billionaire Poker; Babylon Casino	(Macau) APT Championships Macau; CHAMPIONSHIPS EVENT HK$22,000 (US$2,802)	108	HK$2,095,200 (US$266,937)	(Hong Kong) Park Yu Cheung	HK$428,000 (US$54,529)	
25 April-6 May; Billionaire Poker; Babylon Casino	(Macau) APT Championships Macau; CHAMPIONSHIPS EVENT HK$22,000 (US$2,802)	Player of the Series APT Championships Macau: (Taiwan) Hung Sheng Lin				
15–24 June; Paradise Walker-Hill Casino	(South Korea) APT Series Korea Seoul ₩1,100,000 (US$1,117)	170	₩164,900,000 (US$149,147)	(South Korea) Jinwoo Kim	₩26,225,000 (US$23,719)	
15–24 June; Paradise Walker-Hill Casino	(South Korea) APT Series Korea Seoul ₩1,100,000 (US$1,117)	Player of the Series APT Korea – Seoul: (Canada) Stephane Blouin				
11–22 July; Pro Poker Club; Ho Chi Minh	(Vietnam) APT Championships Vietnam; MAIN EVENT ₫22,000,000 (US$960)	499	₫9,680,600,000 (US$422,083)	(Vietnam) Dang Xuan Canh	₫1,636,770,000 (US$71,364)	
11–22 July; Pro Poker Club; Ho Chi Minh	(Vietnam) APT Championships Vietnam; CHAMPIONSHIPS EVENT ₫33,000,000 (US$1,440)	213	₫6,198,300,000 (US$269,698)	(Vietnam) Cao Ngoc Anh	₫1,304,030,000 (US$56,740)	
11–22 July; Pro Poker Club; Ho Chi Minh	(Vietnam) APT Championships Vietnam; CHAMPIONSHIPS EVENT ₫33,000,000 (US$1,440)	Player of the Series APT Championships Vietnam: Cao Ngoc Anh				
8–19 August; Paradise Hotel & Resort	(South Korea) APT Championships Korea Incheon; MAIN EVENT ₩1,100,000 (US$984)	192	₩186,240,000 (US$166,562)	(Japan) Iori Yogo	₩40,463,000 (US$36,187)	
8–19 August; Paradise Hotel & Resort	(South Korea) APT Championships Korea Incheon; CHAMPIONSHIPS EVENT ₩1,650,000 (US$1,462)	148	₩215,340,000 (US$190,771)	(United States) Geoffrey You	₩49,770,000 (US$44,091)	
8–19 August; Paradise Hotel & Resort	(South Korea) APT Championships Korea Incheon; CHAMPIONSHIPS EVENT ₩1,650,000 (US$1,462)	Player of the Series APT Championships Korea – Incheon: (Japan) Inotsume Kazuma				
13–24 September; Resorts World Manila	APT Championships Philippines II; MAIN EVENT ₱55,000 (US$1,020); Guaranteed ₱8,000,000 (US$148,298)	306	₱14,841,000 (US$275,112)	(Philippines) Lester Edoc	₱2,849,600 (US$52,824)	
13–24 September; Resorts World Manila	APT Championships Philippines II; CHAMPIONSHIPS EVENT ₱82,500 (US$1,529); Guaranteed ₱8,000,000 (US$148,251)	174	₱12,658,500 (US$234,579)	(South Korea) Lim Yohwan	₱2,819,900 (US$52,256)	
13–24 September; Resorts World Manila	APT Championships Philippines II; CHAMPIONSHIPS EVENT ₱82,500 (US$1,529); Guaranteed ₱8,000,000 (US$148,251)	Player of the Series APT Championships Philippines II: Lester Edoc				
5–11 October; Pro Poker Club; Ho Chi Minh	APT Series Vietnam Ho Chi Minh ₫ 22,000,000 (US$947); Guaranteed ₫6,000,000,000 (US$258,233)	498	₫9,661,200,000 (US$415,807)	(Japan) Tetsuya Tsuchikawa	₫1,638,200,000 (US$70,506)	
5–11 October; Pro Poker Club; Ho Chi Minh	APT Series Vietnam Ho Chi Minh ₫ 22,000,000 (US$947); Guaranteed ₫6,000,000,000 (US$258,233)	Player of the Series APT Vietnam – Ho Chi Minh: (Japan) Tetsuya Enoki				
27 November-8 December; Resorts World Manila	APT Championships Philippines FINALE; MAIN EVENT ₱55,000 (US$1,047); Guaranteed ₱10,000,000 (US$190,368)	307	₱14,889,500 (US$283,449)	(Japan) Mikiya Kudo	₱2,844,200 (US$54,145)	
27 November-8 December; Resorts World Manila	APT Championships Philippines FINALE; CHAMPIONSHIPS EVENT ₱165,000 (US$3,142); Guaranteed ₱10,000,000 (US$190,422)	71	₱10,330,500 (US$196,716)	(Japan) Iori Yogo	₱2,872,800 (US$54,705)	
27 November-8 December; Resorts World Manila	APT Championships Philippines FINALE; CHAMPIONSHIPS EVENT ₱165,000 (US$3,142); Guaranteed ₱10,000,000 (US$190,422)	Player of the Series APT Championships Philippines Finale: (Japan) Kosei Ichinose				

=== 2019 ===
Date/Venue	Buy-in	Entrants	Prize Pool	Winner	Winner Prize	Results
APT Vietnam I Kick-Off; 9–20 January; Pro Poker Club; Ho Chi Minh; Vietnam	MAIN EVENT – Guaranteed ₫8,000,000,000 (US$345,707)					
APT Vietnam I Kick-Off; 9–20 January; Pro Poker Club; Ho Chi Minh; Vietnam	₫22,000,000 (US$950)	576	₫11,021,700,000 (US$476,282)	(India) Abhinav Iyer	₫2,269,092,000 (US$98,055)	
APT Vietnam I Kick-Off; 9–20 January; Pro Poker Club; Ho Chi Minh; Vietnam	CHAMPIONSHIPS EVENT – Guaranteed ₫6,000,000,000 (US$258,875)					
APT Vietnam I Kick-Off; 9–20 January; Pro Poker Club; Ho Chi Minh; Vietnam	₫38,500,000 (US$1,661)	248	₫7,835,306,000 (US$338,061)	(South Korea) Yohwan Lim	₫2,040,542,000 (US$88,040)	
APT Vietnam I Kick-Off; 9–20 January; Pro Poker Club; Ho Chi Minh; Vietnam	Player of the Series APT Vietnam Ho Chi Minh I Kick-Off: (Denmark) Michael Kim Falcon					
APT Tokyo Japan; 19–28 January; Stadium Casino (Amusement Casino); Tokyo; Japan	MAIN EVENT					
APT Tokyo Japan; 19–28 January; Stadium Casino (Amusement Casino); Tokyo; Japan	¥30,000 (US$272)	234	see below	(Thailand) Kannapong Thanarattrakul	see below	
APT Tokyo Japan; 19–28 January; Stadium Casino (Amusement Casino); Tokyo; Japan	APT Tokyo Japan: MAIN EVENT PRIZE POOL: 1st APT Philippines I 2019 Main Event ticket, Championships Event ticket, High Rollers ticket plus airfare and hotel accommodations. 2nd APT Philippines I 2019 Main Event ticket, Championships Event ticket plus airfare and hotel accommodations. 3rd and 4th APT Philippines I 2019 Main Event ticket plus airfare and hotel accommodations.					
APT Tokyo Japan; 19–28 January; Stadium Casino (Amusement Casino); Tokyo; Japan	Player of the Series APT Tokyo Japan: (China) Jin Bo					
APT Taiwan I 20 February-3 March; Asia Poker Arena; CTP Poker Club; Taipei; Taiwan	MAIN EVENT – Guaranteed NT$5,000,000 (US$162,415)					
APT Taiwan I 20 February-3 March; Asia Poker Arena; CTP Poker Club; Taipei; Taiwan	NT$33,000 (US$1,072)	523	NT$15,219,300 (US$494,371)	(Hong Kong) Chow Cliff	NT$2,443,800 (US$79,382)	
APT Taiwan I 20 February-3 March; Asia Poker Arena; CTP Poker Club; Taipei; Taiwan	CHAMPIONSHIPS EVENT – Guaranteed NT$5,000,000 (US$162,548)					
APT Taiwan I 20 February-3 March; Asia Poker Arena; CTP Poker Club; Taipei; Taiwan	NT$49,500 (US$1,609)	288	NT$12,571,200 (US$408,688)	(China) Dong Chen	NT$2,955,000 (US$96,066)	
APT Taiwan I 20 February-3 March; Asia Poker Arena; CTP Poker Club; Taipei; Taiwan	Player of the Series APT Taiwan I: (Hong Kong) Alan King Lun Lau					
APT Philippines I 24 April-5 May; Resorts World Manila; Manila; Philippines	MAIN EVENT – Guaranteed ₱10,000,000 (US$191,595)					
APT Philippines I 24 April-5 May; Resorts World Manila; Manila; Philippines	₱55,000 (US$1,054)	503	₱24,395,500 (US$467,407)	(Philippines) Christopher Mateo	₱4,376,000 (US$83,842)	
APT Philippines I 24 April-5 May; Resorts World Manila; Manila; Philippines	CHAMPIONSHIPS EVENT – Guaranteed ₱10,000,000 (US$192,741)					
APT Philippines I 24 April-5 May; Resorts World Manila; Manila; Philippines	₱82,500 (US$1,590)	316	₱22,949,000 (US$442,332)	(South Korea) Siyoung Lee	₱5,295,900 (US$102,076)	
APT Philippines I 24 April-5 May; Resorts World Manila; Manila; Philippines	Player of the Series APT Philippines I: (Japan) Iori Yogo					
APT Korea Seoul; 29 May-9 June; Paradise Walker-Hill Casino; Korea; Seoul	MAIN EVENT – Guaranteed ₩180,000,000 (US$151,260)					
APT Korea Seoul; 29 May-9 June; Paradise Walker-Hill Casino; Korea; Seoul	₩1,320,000 (US$1,190)	180	₩209,520,000 (US$176,101)	(Japan) Go Saito	₩54,364,000 (US$45,693)	
APT Korea Seoul; 29 May-9 June; Paradise Walker-Hill Casino; Korea; Seoul	CHAMPIONSHIPS EVENT – Guaranteed ₩180,000,000 (US$152,413)					
APT Korea Seoul; 29 May-9 June; Paradise Walker-Hill Casino; Korea; Seoul	₩1,980,000 (US$1,181)	108	₩60,430,000 (US$51,178)	(Thailand) Punnat Punsri	₩209,520,000 (US$461,148)	
APT Korea Seoul; 29 May-9 June; Paradise Walker-Hill Casino; Korea; Seoul	Player of the Series APT Korea Seoul: (Hong Kong) Edward Chun Ho Yam					
APT Vietnam II; 3–14 July; Pro Poker Club; Vietnam; Ho Chi Minh	MAIN EVENT – Guaranteed ₫8,000,000,000 (US$346,258)					
APT Vietnam II; 3–14 July; Pro Poker Club; Vietnam; Ho Chi Minh	₫22,000,000 (US$952)	458	₫8,885,200,000 (US$384,572)	(China) Zhou Jiaping	₫1,892,170,000 (US$81,897)	
APT Vietnam II; 3–14 July; Pro Poker Club; Vietnam; Ho Chi Minh	CHAMPIONSHIPS EVENT – Guaranteed ₫6,000,000,000 (US$259,909)					
APT Vietnam II; 3–14 July; Pro Poker Club; Vietnam; Ho Chi Minh	₫38,500,000 (US$1,668)	192	₫6,518,400,000 (US$282,365)	(New Zealand) Oliver Helm	₫1,218,670,000 (US$52,791)	
APT Vietnam II; 3–14 July; Pro Poker Club; Vietnam; Ho Chi Minh	Player of the Series APT Vietnam Ho Chi Minh II: Nguyen Tien Thanh					
(South Korea) APT Korea Incheon; 2–13 August; Paradise Hotel & Resort; Korea; Incheon	MAIN EVENT – Guaranteed ₩200,000,000 (US$166,113)					
(South Korea) APT Korea Incheon; 2–13 August; Paradise Hotel & Resort; Korea; Incheon	₩1,320,000 (US$1,096)	236	₩274,704,000 (US$228,152)	(Hong Kong) Dicky Siu Hang Tsang	₩59,485,000 (US$49,405)	
(South Korea) APT Korea Incheon; 2–13 August; Paradise Hotel & Resort; Korea; Incheon	CHAMPIONSHIPS EVENT – Guaranteed ₩200,000,000 (US$165,562)					
(South Korea) APT Korea Incheon; 2–13 August; Paradise Hotel & Resort; Korea; Incheon	₩1,980,000 (US$1,639)	148	₩382,374,000 (US$316,519)	(Singapore) Graeme Siow	₩84,951,000 (US$70,320)	
(South Korea) APT Korea Incheon; 2–13 August; Paradise Hotel & Resort; Korea; Incheon	Player of the Series APT Korea – Incheon: (Taiwan) Li-Ta Hsu					
APT Philippines II; 11–22 September; Resorts World Manila; Manila; Philippines	MAIN EVENT – Guaranteed ₱10,000,000 (US$192,753)					
APT Philippines II; 11–22 September; Resorts World Manila; Manila; Philippines	₱55,000 (US$1,060)	515	₱24,977,500 (US$481,451)	(Peru) Yohn Paredes	₱4,369,400 (US$84,222)	
APT Philippines II; 11–22 September; Resorts World Manila; Manila; Philippines	CHAMPIONSHIPS EVENT – Guaranteed ₱10,000,000 (US$191,508)					
APT Philippines II; 11–22 September; Resorts World Manila; Manila; Philippines	₱82,500 (US$1,580)	316	₱19,278,700 (US$369,202)	(China) Xixiang Luo	₱4,594,800 (US$87,994)	
APT Philippines II; 11–22 September; Resorts World Manila; Manila; Philippines	Player of the Series APT Philippines II: Richard Nakila					
APT Taiwan II; 9–20 October; Asia Poker Arena; CTP Poker Club; Taipei; Taiwan	MAIN EVENT – Guaranteed NT$6,000,000 (US$194,906)					
APT Taiwan II; 9–20 October; Asia Poker Arena; CTP Poker Club; Taipei; Taiwan	NT$33,000 (US$1,072)	285	NT$8,293,500 (US$269,409)	(Taiwan) Zong Chi He	NT$1,949,900 (US$63,341)	
APT Taiwan II; 9–20 October; Asia Poker Arena; CTP Poker Club; Taipei; Taiwan	CHAMPIONSHIPS EVENT – Guaranteed NT$5,000,000 (US$162,548)					
APT Taiwan II; 9–20 October; Asia Poker Arena; CTP Poker Club; Taipei; Taiwan	NT$49,500 (US$1,609)	144	NT$6,285,600 (US$205,170)	(South Korea) Jinho Hong	NT$1,697,300 (US$55,402)	
APT Taiwan II; 9–20 October; Asia Poker Arena; CTP Poker Club; Taipei; Taiwan	Player of the Series APT Taiwan II: (Philippines) Mike Takayama					
APT Vietnam III; 6–17 November; Pro Poker Club; Ho Chi Minh; Vietnam	MAIN EVENT – Guaranteed ₫8,000,000,000 (US$346,222)					
APT Vietnam III; 6–17 November; Pro Poker Club; Ho Chi Minh; Vietnam	₫22,000,000 (US$952)	436	₫8,458,400,000 (US$366,060)	(India) Akshay Nasa	₫1,486,560,000 (US$64,334)	
APT Vietnam III; 6–17 November; Pro Poker Club; Ho Chi Minh; Vietnam	CHAMPIONSHIPS EVENT – Guaranteed ₫6,000,000,000 (US$259,600)					
APT Vietnam III; 6–17 November; Pro Poker Club; Ho Chi Minh; Vietnam	₫38,500,000 (US$1,665)	179	₫6,077,050,000 (US$262,933)	(France) Vincent Chauve	₫1,576,810,000 (US$68,223)	
APT Vietnam III; 6–17 November; Pro Poker Club; Ho Chi Minh; Vietnam	Player of the Series APT Vietnam Ho Chi Minh III: (France) Vincent Chauve					
APT Taiwan III FINALE; 28 November-9 December; Asia Poker Arena; CTP Poker Club; Taipei; Taiwan	MAIN EVENT – Guaranteed NT$6,000,000 (US$196,668)					
APT Taiwan III FINALE; 28 November-9 December; Asia Poker Arena; CTP Poker Club; Taipei; Taiwan	NT$31,000 (US$1,016)	319	NT$9,823,900 (US$322,009)	(China) Zhou Yue Yang	NT$2,138,200 (US$70,086)	
APT Taiwan III FINALE; 28 November-9 December; Asia Poker Arena; CTP Poker Club; Taipei; Taiwan	CHAMPIONSHIPS EVENT – Guaranteed NT$6,000,000 (US$196,889)					
APT Taiwan III FINALE; 28 November-9 December; Asia Poker Arena; CTP Poker Club; Taipei; Taiwan	NT$49,500 (US$1,624)	159	NT$6,940,300 (US$227,743)	(Netherlands) Tobias Peters	NT$1,848,800 (US$60,668)	
APT Taiwan III FINALE; 28 November-9 December; Asia Poker Arena; CTP Poker Club; Taipei; Taiwan	Player of the Series APT Taiwan III Finale: (China) Zhou Yue Yang					

=== 2020 LIVE ===
Date/Venue	Buy-in	Entrants	Prize Pool	Winner	Winner Prize	Results
APT Vietnam I Kick-Off; 10–21 January; Pro Poker Club; Ho Chi Minh; Vietnam	MAIN EVENT – Guaranteed ₫8,000,000,000 (US$346,185)					
APT Vietnam I Kick-Off; 10–21 January; Pro Poker Club; Ho Chi Minh; Vietnam	₫21,000,000 (US$909)	365	₫7,760,000,000 (US$335,800)	(South Africa) Rayhaan Adam	₫1,731,440,000 (US$74,924)	
APT Vietnam I Kick-Off; 10–21 January; Pro Poker Club; Ho Chi Minh; Vietnam	CHAMPIONSHIPS EVENT – Guaranteed ₫6,000,000,000 (US$260,258)					
APT Vietnam I Kick-Off; 10–21 January; Pro Poker Club; Ho Chi Minh; Vietnam	₫38,500,000 (US$1,670)	248	₫5,820,000,000 (US$338,061)	(Vietnam) Ha Duong	₫1,331,200,000 (US$57,743)	
APT Vietnam I Kick-Off; 10–21 January; Pro Poker Club; Ho Chi Minh; Vietnam	Player of the Series APT Vietnam Ho Chi Minh I Kick-Off: (Australia) TANJA VUJANIC					
APT Taiwan I 5–15 March; Asia Poker Arena; CTP Poker Club; Taipei; Taiwan	MAIN EVENT					
APT Taiwan I 5–15 March; Asia Poker Arena; CTP Poker Club; Taipei; Taiwan	NT$33,000 (US$1,103)	82	NT$2,386,200 (US$79,771)	(New Zealand) Hamish Crawshaw	NT$2,443,800 (US$79,382)	
APT Taiwan I 5–15 March; Asia Poker Arena; CTP Poker Club; Taipei; Taiwan	CHAMPIONSHIPS EVENT					
APT Taiwan I 5–15 March; Asia Poker Arena; CTP Poker Club; Taipei; Taiwan	NT$49,500 (US$1,653)	29	NT$1,265,800 (US$42,273)	(Singapore) Wilson Lim	NT$721,500 (US$24,096)	
APT Taiwan I 5–15 March; Asia Poker Arena; CTP Poker Club; Taipei; Taiwan	Player of the Series APT Taiwan I: (Hong Kong) Chan Lok Ming					
APT Vietnam II Da Nang; 7–18 April; Da Nang; Vietnam	POSTPONED; March 9, 2020 – Due to the ongoing COVID-19 (novel coronavirus 2019) situation, and the latest advisories issued by the Vietnamese Government and local health authorities, APT Vietnam – Da Nang scheduled for 7 to 18 April 2020 will now be postponed and rescheduled for 19 to 30 August 2020.					
APT Philippines I 24 April-5 May; Resorts World Manila; Manila; Philippines	CANCELLED; Because of the ongoing COVID-19 situation (lockdown), it is with regret that APT Philippines is cancelled.					
APT Vietnam III Ho Chi Minh; 3–14 June; Pro Poker Club; Ho Chi Minh; Vietnam	POSTPONED; May 22, 2020 – Due to the ongoing COVID-19 (novel coronavirus 2019) situation, and travel restrictions, APT Vietnam III – Ho Chi Minh scheduled to take place next month from 3 to 14 June 2020 has been postponed until further notice. CANCELLED; June 3, 2020 – It is with regret that APT Vietnam II – Ho Chi Minh is cancelled.					
(South Korea) APT Korea Seoul; 25–31 July; Paradise Walker-Hill Casino; Korea; Seoul	CANCELLED; Due to the ongoing COVID-19 situation, and travel restrictions, APT Korea Seoul and Incheon has been cancelled.					
(South Korea) APT Korea Incheon; 1–11 August; Paradise Hotel & Resort; Korea; Incheon	CANCELLED; Due to the ongoing COVID-19 situation, and travel restrictions, APT Korea Seoul and Incheon has been cancelled.					
APT Vietnam II Da Nang; 19–30 August; Da Nang; Vietnam	CANCELLED					
APT Philippines II; 8–21 September; Resorts World Manila; Manila; Philippines	CANCELLED; Due to the ongoing COVID-19 (novel coronavirus 2019) situation, and travel restrictions, the APT Philippines scheduled to take place next month from 8 to 21 September 2020 has been cancelled.					
APT/TMT Taichung Championships; 23 October-9 November; Chinese Texas Hold'em Poker Association; CTP Poker Club; Taichung; Taiwan	APT Special Events during APT/TMT Taiwan Millions Tournament; CHAMPIONSHIPS EVENT – Guaranteed NT$500,000 (US$17,501)					
APT/TMT Taichung Championships; 23 October-9 November; Chinese Texas Hold'em Poker Association; CTP Poker Club; Taichung; Taiwan	NT$5,000 (US$175)	153	NT$839,200 (US$29,374)	(Taiwan) Chin Kai Chen	NT$196,000 (US$6,860)	
APT Taiwan Special Events during APT/TMT Taiwan Millions Tournament – 23 October-9 November; Chinese Texas Hold'em Poker Association; CTP Poker Club; Taipei; Taiwan	TMT Taiwan Millions Tournament MAIN EVENT – Guaranteed NT$2,500,000 (US$87,507)					
APT Taiwan Special Events during APT/TMT Taiwan Millions Tournament – 23 October-9 November; Chinese Texas Hold'em Poker Association; CTP Poker Club; Taipei; Taiwan	NT$8,000 (US$280)	1,066	NT$6,918,500 (US$242,168)	(Taiwan) Chen An Lin	NT$1,205,000 (US$42,179)	
APT Taiwan Special Events during APT/TMT Taiwan Millions Tournament – 23 October-9 November; Chinese Texas Hold'em Poker Association; CTP Poker Club; Taipei; Taiwan	TMT9 Player of the Series APT/TMT Taiwan Taipei: (Hong Kong) Chan Lok Ming					
(South Korea) APT Korea Busan; 4–11 November; Paradise Casino Busan; Korea; Busan	CANCELLED; De to the ongoing COVID-19 situation, and travel restrictions, APT Korea Busan has been cancelled.					
APT Philippines III FINALE; 2–13 December; Resorts World Manila; Manila; Philippines	CANCELLED; Because of the ongoing COVID-19 situation (lockdown), it is with regret that APT Philippines Finale is cancelled.					

=== 2020 ONLINE ===
Date/Website	Buy-in	Entrants	Prize Pool	Winner	Winner Prize	Results
APT ONLINE at NATURAL8; 1st EDITION; 29 April-10 May www.natural8.com	ONLINE MAIN EVENT – Guaranteed US$200,000					
APT ONLINE at NATURAL8; 1st EDITION; 29 April-10 May www.natural8.com	US$500	1,217	US$578,075	(Singapore) Alex Xiang Wei Lee (DblBarrel)	US$91,353.53	
APT ONLINE at NATURAL8; 1st EDITION; 29 April-10 May www.natural8.com	ONLINE CHAMPIONSHIPS EVENT – Guaranteed US$250,000					
APT ONLINE at NATURAL8; 1st EDITION; 29 April-10 May www.natural8.com	US$800	753	US$572,280	(Thailand) Michael Kim Falcon (Dirtyduck)	US$97,445	
APT ONLINE at NATURAL8; 1st EDITION; 29 April-10 May www.natural8.com	Player of the Series APT ONLINE 1st EDITION at Natural8: (Thailand) Michael Kim Falcon (Dirtyduck)					
APT ONLINE at NATURAL8; 2nd EDITION; 14–28 June www.natural8.com	ONLINE MAIN EVENT – Guaranteed US$1,000,000					
APT ONLINE at NATURAL8; 2nd EDITION; 14–28 June www.natural8.com	US$500	1,985	US$1,000,000	(Canada) (EL BEANjo)	US$144,352.56	
APT ONLINE at NATURAL8; 2nd EDITION; 14–28 June www.natural8.com	ONLINE CHAMPIONSHIPS EVENT – Guaranteed US$1,000,000					
APT ONLINE at NATURAL8; 2nd EDITION; 14–28 June www.natural8.com	US$800	1,352	US$1,026.760	(Taiwan) Pete Yen Han Chen (TurboPete)	US$113,844.25	
APT ONLINE at NATURAL8; 2nd EDITION; 14–28 June www.natural8.com	Player of the Series APT ONLINE end EDITION at Natural8: (Taiwan) Pete Yen Han Chen (TurboPete)					

=== 2021 LIVE ===
Date/Venue	Buy-in	Entrants	Prize Pool	Winner	Winner Prize	Results
APT Taiwan; 27 February-8 March; Asia Poker Arena; CTP Poker Club; Taipei; Taiwan	MAIN EVENT					
APT Taiwan; 27 February-8 March; Asia Poker Arena; CTP Poker Club; Taipei; Taiwan	NT$33,000 (US$1,186)	196	NT$2,851,800 (US$102,428)	(Taiwan) Hui Chen Kuo	NT$724,200 (US$26,011)	
APT Taiwan; 27 February-8 March; Asia Poker Arena; CTP Poker Club; Taipei; Taiwan	CHAMPIONSHIPS EVENT					
APT Taiwan; 27 February-8 March; Asia Poker Arena; CTP Poker Club; Taipei; Taiwan	NT$49,500 (US$1,782)	196	NT$1,985,500 (US$71,460)	(Taiwan) Ping Hao Huang	NT$603,300 (US$21,713)	
APT Taiwan; 27 February-8 March; Asia Poker Arena; CTP Poker Club; Taipei; Taiwan	Player of the Series APT Taiwan: Kun Han Lee					
APT PIPT NATURAL8 Vietnam Phu Quoc; 14–26 May; Corona Casino and Resort; Phu Quoc; Vietnam	QUALIFY ONLINE TO PLAY LIVE; April 30, 2021 – The Asian Poker Tour ('APT') is pleased to announce its partnership with Pearl Island Poker Tour (PIPT), Natural8 (N8), and Corona Casino & Resort to host the first-ever APT Vietnam Phu Quoc 2021. The APT Vietnam Phu Quoc 2021 is scheduled from May 14 to 21 on Natural8.com and from May 22 to 30 at Corona Casino and Resort Phu Quoc, Vietnam.					
APT PIPT NATURAL8 Vietnam Phu Quoc; 14–26 May; Corona Casino and Resort; Phu Quoc; Vietnam	POSTPONED; May 4, 2021 – Due to the Vietnamese Government imposing travel bans within the country amid the rise of COVID-19 cases, APT Phu Quoc will be rescheduled to the week after ban is lifted.					
(South Korea) APT / IT's POKER Korea; Qualify:3–25 July; FINALS: 9–12 September; Boryeong Base Golf and Resort; Korea; Boryeong	MAIN EVENT – Guaranteed ₩230,000,000 (US$196,918)					
(South Korea) APT / IT's POKER Korea; Qualify:3–25 July; FINALS: 9–12 September; Boryeong Base Golf and Resort; Korea; Boryeong	6 Tickets ₩660,000 (US$411)	540	₩250,000,000 (US$214,041)	(South Korea) In Ho Song	₩70,000,000 (US$59,931)	
(South Korea) APT / IT's POKER Korea; Qualify:3–25 July; FINALS: 9–12 September; Boryeong Base Golf and Resort; Korea; Boryeong	CHAMPIONSHIPS EVENT – Guaranteed ₩150,000,000 (US$128,314)					
(South Korea) APT / IT's POKER Korea; Qualify:3–25 July; FINALS: 9–12 September; Boryeong Base Golf and Resort; Korea; Boryeong	14 Tickets ₩1,540,000 (US$1,316)	148	₩150,000,000 (US$128,314)	(South Korea) Gyu Hyuk Lee	₩37,000,000 (US$31,629)	

=== 2021 ONLINE ===
Date/Website	Buy-in	Entrants	Prize Pool	Winner	Winner Prize	Results
(India) APT ONLINE; SERIES INDIA at PokerBaazi.com; 1st EDITION; 16–25 January www.pokerbaazi.com ₹80,000,000+ GTD (8CR)	ONLINE MAIN EVENT – Guaranteed ₹20,000,000 (2CR) (~US$273,400)					
(India) APT ONLINE; SERIES INDIA at PokerBaazi.com; 1st EDITION; 16–25 January www.pokerbaazi.com ₹80,000,000+ GTD (8CR)	₹11,000 (~US$150)	1,932	₹20,000,000 (~US$273,400)	(India) Rajat Mahajan (happyfish)	₹3,406,000 (~US$ 46,680)	
(India) APT ONLINE; SERIES INDIA at PokerBaazi.com; 1st EDITION; 16–25 January www.pokerbaazi.com ₹80,000,000+ GTD (8CR)	ONLINE CHAMPIONSHIPS EVENT – Guaranteed ₹4,000,000 (40L) (~US$54,700)					
(India) APT ONLINE; SERIES INDIA at PokerBaazi.com; 1st EDITION; 16–25 January www.pokerbaazi.com ₹80,000,000+ GTD (8CR)	₹22,000 (~US$300)	275	₹4,000,000 (~US$54,700)	(India) Manish Lakhotia (thekid)	₹1,214,950 (~US$16,600)	
(India) APT ONLINE; SERIES INDIA at PokerBaazi.com; 1st EDITION; 16–25 January www.pokerbaazi.com ₹80,000,000+ GTD (8CR)	Player of the Series APT ONLINE SERIES INDIA 1st EDITION at PokerBaazi.com: (India) Vivekk Dube (Vivek25)					
(India) APT ONLINE; SERIES INDIA 2.0 at PokerBaazi.com; 2nd EDITION; 1–8 August www.pokerbaazi.com ₹82,000,000+ GTD (8,2CR)	ONLINE MAIN EVENT – Guaranteed ₹10,000,000 (1CR) (~US$134,780)					
(India) APT ONLINE; SERIES INDIA 2.0 at PokerBaazi.com; 2nd EDITION; 1–8 August www.pokerbaazi.com ₹82,000,000+ GTD (8,2CR)	₹7,700 (~US$104)	1,465	₹10,255,000 (~US$138,800)	(India) Subhayan Das (arjun100)	₹1,517,000 (~US$20,450)	
(India) APT ONLINE; SERIES INDIA 2.0 at PokerBaazi.com; 2nd EDITION; 1–8 August www.pokerbaazi.com ₹82,000,000+ GTD (8,2CR)	ONLINE CHAMPIONSHIPS EVENT – Guaranteed ₹5,000,000 (50L)					
(India) APT ONLINE; SERIES INDIA 2.0 at PokerBaazi.com; 2nd EDITION; 1–8 August www.pokerbaazi.com ₹82,000,000+ GTD (8,2CR)	₹22,000 (~US$300)	273	₹5,460,000 (~US$ 73,580)	(India) Gaurav Sood (gaug17)	₹1,206,114 (~US$ 16,250)	
(India) APT ONLINE; SERIES INDIA 2.0 at PokerBaazi.com; 2nd EDITION; 1–8 August www.pokerbaazi.com ₹82,000,000+ GTD (8,2CR)	Player of the Series APT ONLINE SERIES INDIA 2.0 – 2nd EDITION at PokerBaazi.com: (India) Vinay Rajpal (vinay09)					

=== 2022 LIVE ===
Date/Venue	Buy-in	Entrants	Prize Pool	Winner	Winner Prize	Results
APT-RWM Mystery Bounty Weekend; 3–6 Match; Resorts World Manila; Manila; Philippines	MAIN EVENT – Guaranteed ₱3,000,000 (~US$57.870)					
APT-RWM Mystery Bounty Weekend; 3–6 Match; Resorts World Manila; Manila; Philippines	₱513,200 (~US$250)	348	₱2,658,700 (~US$51,287)	(Philippines) Jeorge Lagatuz plus ₱76,050 (~US$1,467) in bounties	₱600,400 (~US$11,582)	
APT Vietnam Phu Quoc; 8–17 Abril; Casino Corona Resort; Phu Quoc; Vietnam	MAIN EVENT – Guaranteed ₫3,000,000,000 (~US$131,118)					
APT Vietnam Phu Quoc; 8–17 Abril; Casino Corona Resort; Phu Quoc; Vietnam	₫16,500,000 (~US$721)	378	₫5,499,900,000 (~US$240,377)	(Vietnam) Hue Dang	₫1,220,590,000 (~US$53,346)	
APT Vietnam Phu Quoc; 8–17 Abril; Casino Corona Resort; Phu Quoc; Vietnam	Player of the Series APT Vietnam Phu Quoc: (Philippines) Vamerdino Magsakay					
APT Philippines I 27 April-8 May; Grand Wing Resorts World; Manila; Philippines	MAIN EVENT – Guaranteed ₱15,000,000 (~US$286,618)					
APT Philippines I 27 April-8 May; Grand Wing Resorts World; Manila; Philippines	₱55,000 (~US$1,051)	370	₱17,945,000 (~US$342,890)	(Philippines) Renniel Galvez	₱2,572,200 (~US$49,149)	
APT Philippines I 27 April-8 May; Grand Wing Resorts World; Manila; Philippines	CHAMPIONSHIPS EVENT – Guaranteed ₱8,000,000 (~US$152,656)					
APT Philippines I 27 April-8 May; Grand Wing Resorts World; Manila; Philippines	₱82,500 (~US$1,574)	162	₱11,785,500 (~US$224,891)	(Philippines) Moses Saquing	₱3,098,400 (~US$59,123)	
APT Philippines I 27 April-8 May; Grand Wing Resorts World; Manila; Philippines	Player of the Series APT Philippines I: Mike Takayama					
APT Vietnam Hanoi Loyal; 7–19 June; Grand Loyal Poker Club; Vietnam; Hanoi	MAIN EVENT – Guaranteed ₫5,000,000,000 (~US$215,815)					
APT Vietnam Hanoi Loyal; 7–19 June; Grand Loyal Poker Club; Vietnam; Hanoi	₫22,000,000 (~US$950)	471	₫9,137,400,000 (~US$394,401)	(India) Shardul Parthasarathi	₫1,929,250,000 (~US$83,273)	
APT Vietnam Hanoi Loyal; 7–19 June; Grand Loyal Poker Club; Vietnam; Hanoi	CHAMPIONSHIPS EVENT					
APT Vietnam Hanoi Loyal; 7–19 June; Grand Loyal Poker Club; Vietnam; Hanoi	₫38,500,000 (~US$1,668)	216	₫7,333,200,000 (~US$315,766)	(Vietnam) Van Sang Nguyen	₫1,823,500,000 (~US$78,520)	
APT Vietnam Hanoi Loyal; 7–19 June; Grand Loyal Poker Club; Vietnam; Hanoi	Player of the Series APT Vietnam Hanoi Loyal: Tran Duc Son					
APT Vietnam Hanoi Summer Festival VSOP; 12–24 July; VSOP Poker Club; Vietnam; Hanoi	MAIN EVENT – Guaranteed ₫5,000,000,000 (~US$213,597)					
APT Vietnam Hanoi Summer Festival VSOP; 12–24 July; VSOP Poker Club; Vietnam; Hanoi	₫22,000,000 (~US$940)	487	₫9,447,800,000 (~US$403,604)	(Philippines) Vamerdino Magsakay	₫1,986,320,000 (~US$84,854)	
APT Vietnam Hanoi Summer Festival VSOP; 12–24 July; VSOP Poker Club; Vietnam; Hanoi	CHAMPIONSHIPS EVENT – Guaranteed ₫4,000,000,000 (~US$170,867)					
APT Vietnam Hanoi Summer Festival VSOP; 12–24 July; VSOP Poker Club; Vietnam; Hanoi	₫38,500,000 (~US$1,645)	288	₫9,777,600,000 (~US$417,652)	(New Zealand) Slade Fisher	₫2,298,440,000 (~US$98,178)	
APT Vietnam Hanoi Summer Festival VSOP; 12–24 July; VSOP Poker Club; Vietnam; Hanoi	Player of the Series APT Vietnam Hanoi Summer Festival VSOP: (Philippines) Vamerdino Magsakay					
APT Vietnam Ho Chi Minh; 8–17 August; Saigon Poker Club; Vietnam; Ho Chi Minh	MAIN EVENT – Guaranteed ₫6,000,000,000 (~US$256,574)					
APT Vietnam Ho Chi Minh; 8–17 August; Saigon Poker Club; Vietnam; Ho Chi Minh	₫21,000,000 (~US$898)	722	₫14,006,850,000 (~US$598,957)	(Vietnam) Tran Tuan Anh	₫2,127,900,000 (~US$90,992)	
APT Vietnam Ho Chi Minh; 8–17 August; Saigon Poker Club; Vietnam; Ho Chi Minh	Player of the Series APT Vietnam Ho Chi Minh: Phan Huu Minh Tri					
APT Philippines II; 8–18 September; Grand Wing Resorts World; Manila; Philippines	MAIN EVENT – Guaranteed ₱15,000,000 (~US$262,613)					
APT Philippines II; 8–18 September; Grand Wing Resorts World; Manila; Philippines	₱55,000 (~US$963)	497	₱24,104,500 (~US$422,011)	(Philippines) Hernan Jaybee Villa	₱4,560,300 (~US$79,839)	
APT Philippines II; 8–18 September; Grand Wing Resorts World; Manila; Philippines	CHAMPIONSHIPS EVENT – Guaranteed ₱10,000,000 (~US$175,765)					
APT Philippines II; 8–18 September; Grand Wing Resorts World; Manila; Philippines	₱82,500 (~US$1,450)	242	₱17,605,500 (~US$309,442)	(Philippines) David Erquiaga	₱3,925,300 (~US$68,993)	
APT Philippines II; 8–18 September; Grand Wing Resorts World; Manila; Philippines	Player of the Series APT Philippines II: David Erquiaga					
(South Korea) APT Korea Incheon; 18–26 October; Paradise Hotel & Resort; Korea; Incheon	MAIN EVENT – Guaranteed ₩300,000,000 (US$209,956)					
(South Korea) APT Korea Incheon; 18–26 October; Paradise Hotel & Resort; Korea; Incheon	₩2,200,000 (US$1,540)	486	₩942,840,000 (US$659,849)	(Azerbaijan) Farhad Aghayev	₩170,228,000 (US$119,134)	
(South Korea) APT Korea Incheon; 18–26 October; Paradise Hotel & Resort; Korea; Incheon	Player of the Series APT Korea – Incheon: (Japan) Kono Reiji					
APT Philippines III; 15–27 November; Grand Wing Resorts World; Manila; Philippines	MAIN EVENT – Guaranteed ₱15,000,000 (~US$261,483)					
APT Philippines III; 15–27 November; Grand Wing Resorts World; Manila; Philippines	₱55,000 (~US$959)	480	₱23,280,000 (~US$405,823)	(Philippines) Moses Saquing	₱4,915,100 (~US$85,681)	
APT Philippines III; 15–27 November; Grand Wing Resorts World; Manila; Philippines	CHAMPIONSHIPS EVENT – Guaranteed ₱10,000,000 (~US$175,000)					
APT Philippines III; 15–27 November; Grand Wing Resorts World; Manila; Philippines	₱82,500 (~US$1,440)	236	₱17,169,000 (~US$299,595)	(United States) Paul Kiem	₱4,196,300 (~US$73,225)	
APT Philippines III; 15–27 November; Grand Wing Resorts World; Manila; Philippines	Player of the Series APT Philippines III: Mike Takayama					
APT Vietnam Da Nang; 8–18 December; Risemount Premier Resort Danang; Vietnam; Da Nang	MAIN EVENT – Guaranteed ₫10,000,000,000 (~US$424,016)					
APT Vietnam Da Nang; 8–18 December; Risemount Premier Resort Danang; Vietnam; Da Nang	₫33,000,000 (~US$1,399)	487	₫11,960,100,000 (~US$507,128)	(South Korea) Doo Sik Nam	₫2,598,290,000 (~US$110,171)	
APT Vietnam Da Nang; 8–18 December; Risemount Premier Resort Danang; Vietnam; Da Nang	Player of the Series APT Vietnam Da Nang: (Singapore) Benjamin Sai					
Partnership Events
(Vietnam) APT X CTP High Roller Series; 9–18 Abril; CTP Poker Club; Taipei; Taiwan	Player of the Series APT X CTP High Roller Series Taipei Taiwan: (Hong Kong) Yang Tzu Yun					

=== 2022 ONLINE ===
Date/Website	Buy-in	Entrants	Prize Pool	Winner	Winner Prize	Results
(India) APT ONLINE; SERIES INDIA at PokerBaazi.com; 3rd EDITION; 30 January-6 February www.pokerbaazi.com ₹70,000,000+ GTD (7CR)	ONLINE MAIN EVENT – Guaranteed ₹10,000,000 (1CR) (~US$133,375)					
(India) APT ONLINE; SERIES INDIA at PokerBaazi.com; 3rd EDITION; 30 January-6 February www.pokerbaazi.com ₹70,000,000+ GTD (7CR)	₹11,000 (~US$147)	919	₹10,000,000 (~US$133,375)	(India) Amar Mehta (kidpoker0109)	₹17,50,000 (~US$23,445)	
(India) APT ONLINE; SERIES INDIA at PokerBaazi.com; 3rd EDITION; 30 January-6 February www.pokerbaazi.com ₹70,000,000+ GTD (7CR)	ONLINE CHAMPIONSHIPS EVENT – Guaranteed ₹5,000,000 (50L) (~US$66,616)					
(India) APT ONLINE; SERIES INDIA at PokerBaazi.com; 3rd EDITION; 30 January-6 February www.pokerbaazi.com ₹70,000,000+ GTD (7CR)	₹22,000 (~US$295)	285	₹57,00,000 (~US$75,942)	(India) Punya Prabha (madhumangal)	₹10,44,567 (~US$13,916)	
(India) APT ONLINE; SERIES INDIA at PokerBaazi.com; 4th EDITION; 1–10 July www.pokerbaazi.com ₹100,000,000+ GTD (10+CR)	ONLINE MAIN EVENT – Guaranteed ₹15,000,000 (1,5CR) (~US$191,155)					
(India) APT ONLINE; SERIES INDIA at PokerBaazi.com; 4th EDITION; 1–10 July www.pokerbaazi.com ₹100,000,000+ GTD (10+CR)	₹11,000 (~US$140)	1,593	₹1,53,000 (~US$192,546)	(India) Debapriya Manna (detulelungikhul)	₹1,855,000 (~US$23,345)	
(India) APT ONLINE; SERIES INDIA at PokerBaazi.com; 4th EDITION; 1–10 July www.pokerbaazi.com ₹100,000,000+ GTD (10+CR)	ONLINE CHAMPIONSHIPS EVENT – Guaranteed ₹5,000,000 (50L) (~US$63,718)					
(India) APT ONLINE; SERIES INDIA at PokerBaazi.com; 4th EDITION; 1–10 July www.pokerbaazi.com ₹100,000,000+ GTD (10+CR)	₹22,000 (~US$280)	338	₹6,760,000 (~US$85,345)	(India) Puneet Mishra (bonomo)	₹12,19,000 (~US$15,390)	

=== 2023 LIVE ===
Date/Venue	Buy-in	Entrants	Prize Pool	Winner	Winner Prize	Results
APT Vietnam Hanoi VSOP; 2–11 February; VSOP Poker Club; Hanoi; Vietnam	MAIN EVENT – Guaranteed ₫10,000,000,000 (~US$425,988)					
APT Vietnam Hanoi VSOP; 2–11 February; VSOP Poker Club; Hanoi; Vietnam	₫27,500,000 (~US$1,171)	654	₫15,859,500,000 (~US$675,597)	(Vietnam) Hai Nam Hoang	₫2,794,200,000 (~US$119,029)	
APT Vietnam Phu Quoc; 24 March-2 April; Casino Corona Resort; Phu Quoc; Vietnam	MAIN EVENT – Guaranteed ₫10,000,000,000 (~US$425,513)					
APT Vietnam Phu Quoc; 24 March-2 April; Casino Corona Resort; Phu Quoc; Vietnam	₫33,000,000 (~US$1,404)	507	₫14,753,700,000 (~US$627,774)	(United Kingdom) Jacque Ramsden	₫2,304,200,000 (~US$98,044)	
APT Taiwan Taipei; 28 April-7 May; CTP Poker Club; Taipei; Taiwan	MAIN EVENT – Guaranteed NT$30,000,000 (~US$974,944)					
APT Taiwan Taipei; 28 April-7 May; CTP Poker Club; Taipei; Taiwan	NTS50,000 (~US$1,625)	1,434	NTS62,594,100 (~US$2,034,185)	(Thailand) Punnat Punsri	NTS11,210,400 (~US$364,315)	
APT Summer Series Hanoi Vietnam; 26 May-4 June; Grand Loyal Poker Club; Hanoi; Vietnam	MAIN EVENT – Guaranteed ₫12,000,000,000 (~US$511,128)					
APT Summer Series Hanoi Vietnam; 26 May-4 June; Grand Loyal Poker Club; Hanoi; Vietnam	₫35,000,000 (~US$1,490)	581	₫17,752,455,000 (~US$756,148)	(Vietnam) Duc Linh Dinh	₫3,401,355,000 (~US$144,877)	
APT Summer Series Da Nang Vietnam; 21–30 July; Furama Resort; Da Nang; Vietnam	MAIN EVENT – Guaranteed ₫12,000,000,000 (~US$507,112)					
APT Summer Series Da Nang Vietnam; 21–30 July; Furama Resort; Da Nang; Vietnam	₫35,000,000 (~US$1,479)	675	₫20,624,625,000 (~US$871,583)	(Singapore) Shixiang Khoo	₫3,935,285,000 (~US$166,302)	
(South Korea) APT Korea Incheon; 25 August-3 September; Paradise Hotel & Resort; Korea; Incheon	MAIN EVENT – Guaranteed ₩1,300,000,000 (~US$981,873)					
(South Korea) APT Korea Incheon; 25 August-3 September; Paradise Hotel & Resort; Korea; Incheon	₩2,300,000 (~US$1,737)	930	₩1,867,347,000 (~US$1,410,415)	(Japan) Shoichiro Tamaki	₩271,447,000 (~US$205,025)	
APT Hanoi Billions Vietnam; 1–10 December; National Convention Center; Hanoi; Vietnam	MAIN EVENT – Guaranteed ₫25,000,000,000 (~US$1,029,187)					
APT Hanoi Billions Vietnam; 1–10 December; National Convention Center; Hanoi; Vietnam	₫36,000,000 (~US$1,482)	2,350	₫73,855,800,000 (~US$3,040,460)	CANCELLED	₫11,831,710,000 (~US$487,082)	CHOP
APT Hanoi Billions Vietnam; 1–10 December; National Convention Center; Hanoi; Vietnam	Asian Poker Tour – IMPORTANT ANNOUNCEMENT about cancellation oh APT HANOI BOLLIONS 2023 Asian Poker Tour – APT Hanoi Billions 2023: ORIGINAL PAYOUT; Asian Poker Tour – APT Hanoi Billions 2023: FINAL PAYOUT (chop)					
APT Hanoi Billions Vietnam; 1–10 December; National Convention Center; Hanoi; Vietnam	Inside Asian Gaming – Asian Poker Tour cancels Vietnam poker series mid-series amid concerns over legality Gutshot Magazine – APT Hanoi Billions 2023: Remainder Of The Series Cancelled; Gutshot Magazine – APT Hanoi Billions 2023: Remainder Of The Series Cancelled					

=== 2023 ONLINE ===
APT Online by the numbers:

- Tournaments: 330

- 14 Trophy Events
- 316 Side Events

- Festival Entries: 310,388

- APT online Side Event Entries: 273,724
- APT online Trophy Event entries: 36,664

- Series Prize Money: $23,637,286

- Trophy Event Prize Money: $9,772,583
- Non-Trophy Side Event Prize Money: $13,864,703

Date/Website	Buy-in	Entrants	Prize Pool	Winner	Winner Prize	Results
APT ONLINE 2023 at GGPoker; 5-26 November www.ggpoker.com	ONLINE MAIN EVENT – Guaranteed US$2,500,000					
APT ONLINE 2023 at GGPoker; 5-26 November www.ggpoker.com	US$800	4,024	US$3,058,240	(Kazakhstan) whatsgoingon	US$362,070.37	

- APT ONLINE PLAYER OF THE YEAR 2023 - (Taiwan) "JASSS001".

The top three players of the series - (Taiwan) "JASSS001", (Taiwan) "DaDuHow", and (Taiwan) "vincent2288" - won $2,500 APT Live packages to the upcoming APT Hanoi Billions 2023.

=== 2024 ===
Date/Venue	Buy-in	Entrants	Prize Pool	Winner	Winner Prize	Results
APT Taipei 2024; 28 February-10 March; CTP Poker Club; Taipei, Taiwan	MAIN EVENT – Guaranteed NT$65,000,000 (~US$2,000,000)					
APT Taipei 2024; 28 February-10 March; CTP Poker Club; Taipei, Taiwan	NTS70,000 (~US$2,200)	1,182	NTS72,232,020 (~US$2,288,706)	(Japan) Daisuke Ogita	NTS12,944,020 (~US$410,137)	
(South Korea) APT Korea Jeju 2024; 26 April-5 May; Jeju Shinhwa World; Korea, Jeju	MAIN EVENT – Guaranteed ₩2,000,000,000 (~US$1,500,000)					
(South Korea) APT Korea Jeju 2024; 26 April-5 May; Jeju Shinhwa World; Korea, Jeju	₩2,500,000 (~US$1,903)	1,089	₩2,376,742,500 (~US$1,726,493)	(China) Xixiang Luo	₩429,292,500 (~US$311,843)	
APT Taipei; Poker Classic 2024; 27 September-7 October (APA) Asia Poker Arena and (CML) Chinese Mahjong League; Taipei, Taiwan	MAIN EVENT – Guaranteed NT$65,000,000 (~US$2,000,000)					
APT Taipei; Poker Classic 2024; 27 September-7 October (APA) Asia Poker Arena and (CML) Chinese Mahjong League; Taipei, Taiwan	NTS50,000 (~US$1,583)	1,991	NT$86,011,200 (~US$2,724,201)	(Germany) René von Reden	NT$14,413,200 (~US$456,503)	
APT Manila 2024; 28 October-7 November; City of Dreams Grand Ballroom; Manila, Philippines	MAIN EVENT – Guaranteed ₱100,000,000 (~US$1,717,431)					
APT Manila 2024; 28 October-7 November; City of Dreams Grand Ballroom; Manila, Philippines	₱85,000 (~US$1,460)	1,081	₱100,000,000 (~US$1,717,431)	(United States) Daniel Lee	₱15,060,000 (~US$258,645)	
APT Phú Quốc Vietnam 2024; 8–17 November; Corona Resort & Casino Phu Quoc; Phú Quốc, Vietnam	MAIN EVENT – Guaranteed ₫25,000,000,000 (~US$990,000)					
APT Phú Quốc Vietnam 2024; 8–17 November; Corona Resort & Casino Phu Quoc; Phú Quốc, Vietnam	₫36,000,000 (~US$1,425)	795	₫25,000,000,000 (~US$990,138)	(China) Jinlong Hu	₫4,710,000,000 (~US$186,440)	

=== 2024 ONLINE ===
APT Online by the numbers:

- Tournaments: 326

- 20 Trophy Events
- 306 Side Events

- Festival Entries: 378,625

- APT online Side Event Entries: 327,704
- APT online Trophy Event entries: 50,921

- Series Prize Money: $28,191,720

- Trophy Event Prize Money: $12,662,914
- Non-Trophy Side Event Prize Money: $15,528,806

Date/Website	Buy-in	Entrants	Prize Pool	Winner	Winner Prize	Results
APT ONLINE 2024 at GGPoker; 10 November-1 December www.ggpoker.com	ONLINE MAIN EVENT – Guaranteed US$3,000,000					
APT ONLINE 2024 at GGPoker; 10 November-1 December www.ggpoker.com	US$800	4,969	$3,776,440	(Austria) Mathias Joelsson "M Joelsson"	$534,698.10	

=== 2025 ===
The APT Calendar 2025 was announced on December 20, 2024.

Date/Venue	Buy-in	Entrants	Prize Pool	Winner	Winner Prize	Results
APT Manila Classic; 7-16 February; Crowne Plaza Manila Galleria; Manila, Philippines	MAIN EVENT – Guaranteed ₱ 60,000,000 (~US$1,043,000)					
APT Manila Classic; 7-16 February; Crowne Plaza Manila Galleria; Manila, Philippines	₱ 60,000 (~US$1,043)	1,202	₱ 61,681,680 (~US$1,072,622)	(Russia) Ivan Govorov	₱ 11,609,680 (~US$192,498)	
APT Taipei I 25 April-4 May; Red Point Business Center; Taipei, Taiwan	MAIN EVENT – Guaranteed NT$70,000,000 (~US$2,140,000)					
APT Taipei I 25 April-4 May; Red Point Business Center; Taipei, Taiwan	NT$55,000 (~US$1,681)	2,547	NT$121,033,440 (~US$3,720,157)	(Japan) Akira Takasugi	NT$19,009,440 (~US$584,286)	
APT Manila II; ~~30 May-8 June~~; City of Dreams; Manila, Philippines	CANCELLED; The Asian Poker Tour regrettably announces the cancellation of the APT Manila 2025, which was scheduled to take place from May 30 to June 8, 2025, at the City of Dreams Manila.					
(South Korea) APT Korea Incheon; 1-10 August; Paradise Hotel & Resort; Incheon, Korea	MAIN EVENT – Guaranteed ₩ 1,500,000,000 (~US$1,000,000)					
(South Korea) APT Korea Incheon; 1-10 August; Paradise Hotel & Resort; Incheon, Korea	₩ 2,500,000 (~US$1,800)	1,281	₩ 2,725,470,000 (~US$1,963,185)	(China) He Junjie	₩ 380,520,000 (~US$274,093)	
(South Korea) APT Korea Jeju; 26 September-5 October; Jeju Shinhwa World; Jeju, Korea	MAIN EVENT – Guaranteed ₩ 2,200,000,000 (~US$1,560,000)					
(South Korea) APT Korea Jeju; 26 September-5 October; Jeju Shinhwa World; Jeju, Korea	₩ 2,600,000 (~US$1,845)	1,693	₩ 3,761,155,200 (~US$2,669,228)	(Singapore) Abraham Ceesvin	₩ 649,835,200 (~US$461,177)	
APT Taipei Championship; 14-30 November; Red Point Business Center; Taipei, Taiwan	MAIN EVENT – Guaranteed NT$165,000,000 (~US$5,000,000)					
APT Taipei Championship; 14-30 November; Red Point Business Center; Taipei, Taiwan	NT$311,000 (~US$ 10,000)	671	NT$194,080,973 (~US$6,192,637)	(India) Nishant Sharma	NT$37,030,773 (~US$1,181,559)	

=== 2025 ONLINE ===
APT Online by the numbers:

- Tournaments: 381

- 20 Trophy Events
- 361 Side Events

- Festival Entries: 561,960

- APT online Side Event Entries: 500,659
- APT online Trophy Event entries: 61,301

- Series Prize Money: $42,812,094.35

- Trophy Event Prize Money: $15,908,770.55
- Non-Trophy Side Event Prize Money: $26,903,323.8

Date/Website	Buy-in	Entrants	Prize Pool	Winner	Winner Prize	Results
APT ONLINE 2025 at GGPoker; 26 October-17 November www.ggpoker.com	ONLINE MAIN EVENT – Guaranteed US$3,000,000					
APT ONLINE 2025 at GGPoker; 26 October-17 November www.ggpoker.com	US$800	5,680	$4,316,800	(Peru) Oscar Cueva	$601.335,73	

=== 2026 ===
The APT Calendar 2026 was announced on November 9, 2025.

Date/Venue	Buy-in	Entrants	Prize Pool	Winner	Winner Prize	Results
(South Korea) APT Korea Jeju Classic; 30 January-8 February; Les A Casino; Jeju, Korea	MAIN EVENT – Guaranteed ₩ 2,200,000,000 (~US$1,516,415)					
(South Korea) APT Korea Jeju Classic; 30 January-8 February; Les A Casino; Jeju, Korea	₩ 2,300,000 (~US$1,585)	1,718	₩ 3,370,809,600 (~US$2,323,430)	(Canada) William Li	₩ 579,649,600 (~US$399,540)	
APT Taipei I 22 April-3 May; Red Space; Taipei, Taiwan	MAIN EVENT – Guaranteed NT$70,000,000 (~US$2,219,000)					
APT Taipei I 22 April-3 May; Red Space; Taipei, Taiwan	NT$55,000 (~US$1,745)	2,354	NT$109,366,100 (~US$3,473,759)	(Hong Kong) Chun Shing Lau	NT$16,640,100 (~US$528,533)	
(South Korea) APT Korea Incheon; 7-16 August; Paradise City Casino; Incheon, Korea	MAIN EVENT – Guaranteed ₩ 1,500,000,000 (~US$1,065,000)					
(South Korea) APT Korea Incheon; 7-16 August; Paradise City Casino; Incheon, Korea	₩ 2,300,000 (~US$1,775)	1,393	₩ 2,921,070,0000 (~US$2,074,737)	(Hong Kong) Stephen Pang	₩ 411,180,0000 (~US$292,047)	
(South Korea) APT Korea Jeju; 25 September-7 October; Les A Casino; Jeju, Korea	MAIN EVENT – Guaranteed ₩ 2,200,000,000 (~US$1,624,000)					
(South Korea) APT Korea Jeju; 25 September-7 October; Les A Casino; Jeju, Korea	₩ 2,700,000 (~US$1,993)	1,375	₩ 3,140,600,000 (~US$2,318,468)	(China) Jianfeng Sun	₩ 427,565,000 (~US$315,639)	
APT Taipei Championship; 12-29 November; Red Space; Taipei, Taiwan	MAIN EVENT – Guaranteed US$5,000,000 (~NT$162,000,000)					
APT Taipei Championship; 12-29 November; Red Space; Taipei, Taiwan	US$ 10,000 (~NT$324,000)					+info

== Winners by country ==
Place	Country	Main Event	Championships	Accredited
1	Philippines	19	2	3
2	Japan	13	2	1
3	South Korea	11	5	2
4	China	10	2	
5	Vietnam	8	4	
6	India	7	2	
7	Singapore	6	3	
8	Taiwan	5	3	
9	Hong Kong	5	1	3
10	Australia	4		1
11	England	4		
12	Thailand	3	2	
13	Canada	3		
	Germany	3		
	Malaysia	3		
16	New Caledonia	2		
	Norway	2		
	South Africa	2		
	Sweden	2		
	United Kingdom	2		
21	United States	1	2	1
22	New Zealand	1	2	
23	France	1	1	
24	Austria	1		
	Azerbaijan	1		
	Denmark	1		
	India	1		
	Kazakhstan	1		
	Lithuania	1		
	Mauritius	1		
	Peru	1		
	Poland	1		
	Russia	1		
	Ukraine	1		
35	Netherlands		1	
Total	171	128	32	11

* Main and Championship events include LIVE and ONLINE tournaments and TMT Taiwan Millions Tournament 2020
* Accredited events include APT Manila 2013 Iron Man Poker Challenge and APT X CTP High Roller Series
* Not included APT Online India Series main event or championship event. Only local players can play APT Online India Series.
In case of a tie, it will be sorted alphabetically
Up to Season 2026 APT Korea Jeju – (October 2026)
