= Sam Razavi =

English poker player (born 1980)

Samad Razavi (born 25 September 1980), is an English professional poker player and actor based in Brighton, United Kingdom. He is the UK and Ireland Poker tour, Cork (Ireland) leg, champion 2012, Asia Pacific Poker Tour (ANZPT Melbourne leg) Grand Final Champion, 2012 Asian Poker Tour India leg Champion and Asian Poker Tour 5 Time Player Of the Year.

Before turning professional, he worked and trained as an actor before finding a way to succeed in poker as a pro, Razavi himself will admit, that he can put his success down to a single goodwill payment, due to a technical problem from an online poker site, providing a catalyst for his good fortune, as he won his initial bankroll in a small tournament on that site 'with their money' in 2007. After this Razavi found himself playing medium stakes 'Heads Up' cash, no limit Texas hold 'em poker in volume to create a 'wage'.

== Sponsorship ==
Attracted by the play-your-way-into-sponsorship ideals and fresh ideas set up by Neil Channing on http://blackbeltpoker.com, in 2010 Razavi set about gaining enough 'belt points' by playing a huge amount of volume on the 'Black Belt Poker' I-poker 'skin' with the intention of becoming a sponsored professional at 'blue belt' level. He succeeded doing this in October 2010 and quickly rose another level in the program to become 'Brown belt'. The next step in the sites program is the final one, as high as you can get, and was something not-yet achieved by a player and that was to become a 'Black Belt' sponsored player, Razavi was the first to achieve this by a 6th-place finish on 23 January 2011 at the Aussie Millions Main event, poker tournament for a cool A$225,000.

== Humour ==
Razavi's reputation as the joker of the pack amongst the UK's poker fraternity was then confirmed when he won the Cork leg of the 2011 UKIPT (UK and Ireland poker tour) dressed in emerald Irish fatigues, beard and with a table mascot, a leprechaun named 'Seamus'. Razavi also went on to win the player-of-the-year in that series with numerous other cashes in the other legs which earned him free entry into all the next seasons tour legs http://uk.pokernews.com/news/2011/10/sam-razavi-wins-ukipt-leaderboard-7461.htm.

As the joker of the pack he has been noted by the website, poker news (UK) for his eccentric and fun filled antics both in person and on social media sites http://uk.pokernews.com/news/2012/11/sam-razavi-to-become-a-pop-star-9474.htm that are apparently frequently fuelled by Jagermiester and an imaginary friend called 'Gilly'.

This makes Razavi one of the most socially fabled advocates of having fun whilst playing poker which ultimately is a long drawn out game that requires patience and can prove quite boring in lengthy multi day events due to multi table tournaments events modern structures.

== Notable Results ==
In 2012, Razavi notched up several notable live cashes on his hendon mob profile page totalling $550,000 USD, the best of which was his first-place finish at the ANZPT grand final which is the Australian leg of the Asia Pacific Poker Tour for winning a mere $20 online satellite he came home with a return-of-investment of A$326,125 $339,745 USD and the trophy that carries a title in-line with EPT, WPT and WSOP status of being part of one of pokers recognised 'triple crown' achievements.

The latest achievement to date for Razavi was winning the India leg of the Asian Poker Tour (APT) in Goa, this also confirmed his status as Asian Poker tour (APT) player of the year 2012, which gives him free entry into all the next seasons events in 2013 http://uk.pokernews.com/news/2012/12/black-belt-sam-razavi-APT-Player-of-the-Year-9644.htm By 2015 Sam had won the title of APT Player of the Year a record 4 times.
