= Casinos in Goa =

Casinos in state in western India

Goa is one of the few states in India where both onshore and offshore casinos are legally permitted, making it a prominent destination for gaming enthusiasts. Goa has a unique blend of coastals and nightlife, which has been an prime reason for the success of the casino industry, contributing significantly to its tourism and economy.

The setup of the casinos was controversial as live gambling is outlawed in India. This was partially circumvented by hosting the casinos off the mainland. The government in Goa promotes offshore casino ships by granting new gambling licences in an attempt to generate more tourist related revenue. Goa and Sikkim are the only two territories in India that permits casinos.

== Legal framework ==
Under the Goa, Daman and Diu Public Gambling Act, 1976, casinos are allowed to operate within five-star hotels and on offshore vessels, subject to government licensing and regulation. This legal framework has enabled the establishment of various casinos, both land-based and floating, primarily along the Mandovi River and in luxury resorts. Manohar Parrikar granted permanent licenses to casinos in 2014.

== Casinos on land ==
Goa has casinos and gambling establishments on land as well. These establishments are mostly found in Star Hotels. These would be smaller venues which could serve the guests of the hotels and may not be able to accommodate large audiences. Almost every land casino in Goa operate with the same tariffs, slightly varying between one another based on the choice or menu or seasonality. Notable casinos are Deltin Zuri in Varca, Deltin Suites (Casino Hotel), Majestic Paradise (Casino Hotel), Paradise Casinos and Big B Casino.

== Offshore casinos ==
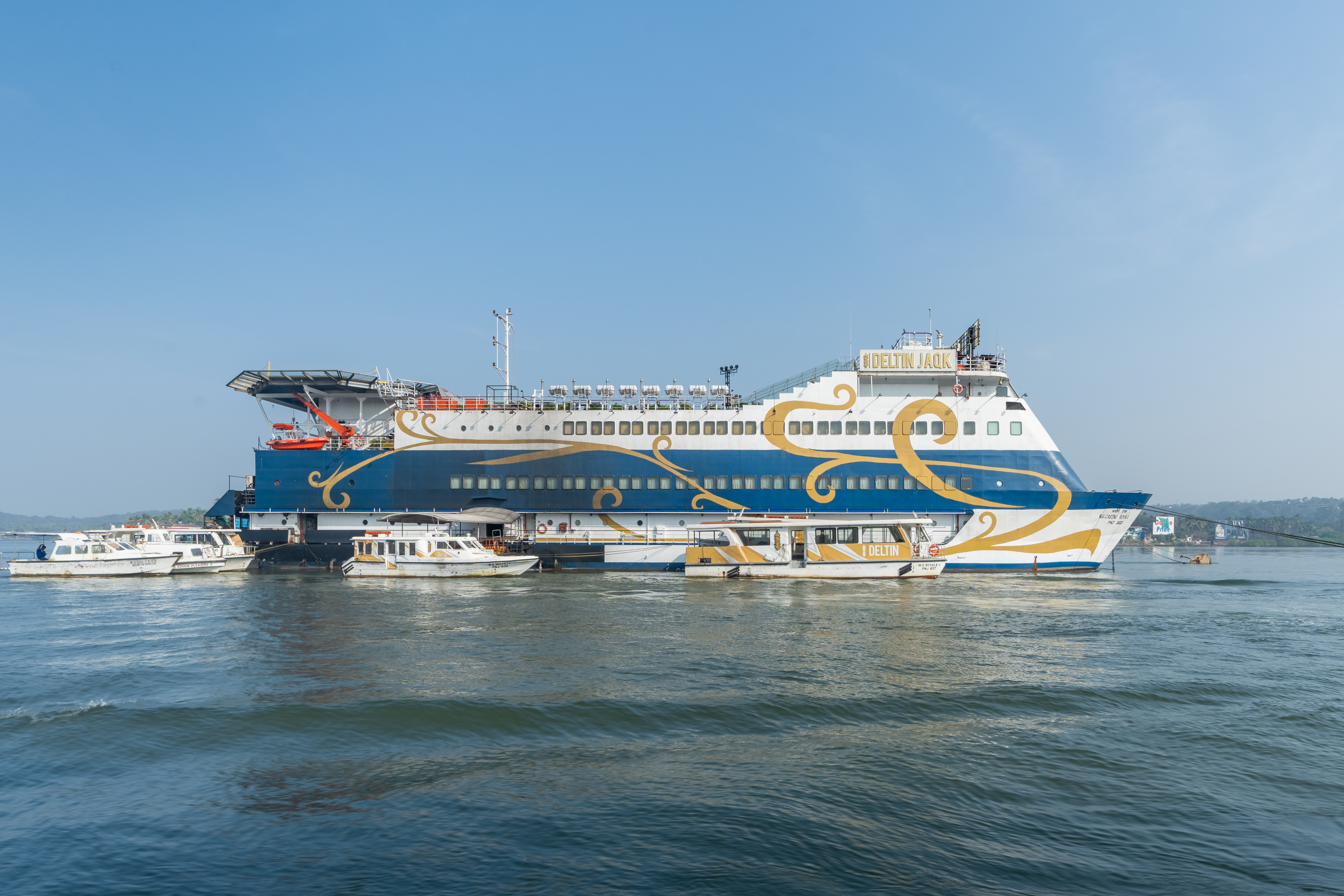
Deltin JAQK

Offshore casinos can be seen in the Mandovi River of Panjim. The anchored cruise liners that are stationed in the river, which serves as a place to host the casinos. There are smaller boats, called feeder boats which are used to bring people on board and off board the casinos. These casinos are priced higher compared to the land ones, as the offshore ones include the feeder boats and are considered an experience.

A few notable offshore casinos include Deltin JAQK, Deltin Royale and King's Casino which are operated by Delta Corp, Majestic Pride and Casino Pride which are operated by Pride Group and Big Daddy Casino.

== Economic impact ==
The casino industry in Goa significantly contributes to the state's revenue and employment. In the fiscal year 2012–2013, casinos contributed approximately ₹135 crores to the state revenue. The industry also plays a vital role in promoting tourism, attracting visitors from across India and abroad.
